= Café-théâtre =

Type of theatrical venue

Théâtre d'Edgar, Paris.

Café-théâtre (French pronunciation: [kafe teɑtʁ]) is the name given in France to small-sized theatre venues where patrons may also order drinks as they watch the performances. Café-théâtres developed in France from the late 1960s, hosting spectacles that were mostly unconventional or of limited means, and could range from ordinary theatrical presentations to stand-up comedy, singing tours, and even improvisational theatre.

Bernard Da Costa created the first Parisian café-théâtre in 1966 at the Royal Café. Other notable theatres include the Café de la Gare, founded in 1968 by Romain Bouteille and Sotha, along with other performers that included Coluche, Patrick Dewaere, Henri Guybet, and Miou-Miou; Le Splendid, founded in 1974 by a collective of actors including Michel Blanc, Gérard Jugnot, Josiane Balasko, Christian Clavier, Thierry Lhermitte and Marie-Anne Chazel; La Veuve Pichard (later renamed Le Point Virgule) founded in 1975 by Gérard Lanvin, Martin Lamotte and Anémone.

Performers who had debuted in café-théâtre gradually became film stars in France in the course of the 1970s, as their style of comedy was exported to the screen. By the 1980s, most of France's new comedy stars, notably the members of Le Splendid's troupe, had begun their career in café-théâtres.

British director Derek Woodward created a touring Theatre Company called 'Cafe Theatre' in the mid-1980s. It was a Dinner theater ensemble that rivalled British Airways Playhouse productions in the Middle and Far East.

== Bibliography ==
- Da Costa, Bernard (1978). Histoire du Café-Théâtre (in French). Buchet-Chastel.
