= List of French films of 1992 =

A list of films produced in France in 1992.

Title	Director	Cast	Genre	Notes
L'Amant	Jean-Jacques Annaud	Tony Leung Ka Fai, Jane March	Drama	
Le Batteur du Boléro	Patrice Leconte		Short	Screened at the 1992 Cannes Film Festival
La Belle Histoire	Claude Lelouch	Gérard Lanvin, Béatrice Dalle	Drama	
Bitter Moon	Roman Polanski	Hugh Grant, Emmanuelle Seigner, Kristin Scott Thomas	Drama	
Céline	Jean-Claude Brisseau			Entered into the 42nd Berlin International Film Festival
Un cœur en hiver	Claude Sautet	Emmanuelle Béart, Daniel Auteuil	Drama	
Damage	Louis Malle	Jeremy Irons, Juliette Binoche	Drama	Nominated for Oscar, +6 wins, +2 nom.
In the Country of Juliets	Mehdi Charef			Entered into the 1992 Cannes Film Festival
Indochine	Régis Wargnier	Catherine Deneuve, Vincent Perez	Romantic drama	Won Oscar, +9 wins, +10 nominations
Patrick Dewaere	Marc Esposito		Documentary	Screened at the 1992 Cannes Film Festival
The Return of Casanova	Édouard Niermans			Entered into the 1992 Cannes Film Festival
Riens du tout	Cédric Klapisch	Fabrice Luchini	Comedy	1 win & 1 nomination
Savage Nights	Cyril Collard	Cyril Collard, Romane Bohringer	Biography drama	5 wins & 3 nominations
The Sentinel	Arnaud Desplechin			Entered into the 1992 Cannes Film Festival
A Tale of Winter	Éric Rohmer			Entered into the 42nd Berlin International Film Festival
La Vie de Bohème	Aki Kaurismäki	Matti Pellonpää, Évelyne Didi, André Wilms	Comedy drama	4 awards
