= Grete Reiner =

Austrian-Czech magazine editor and writer

- Grete Reinerová
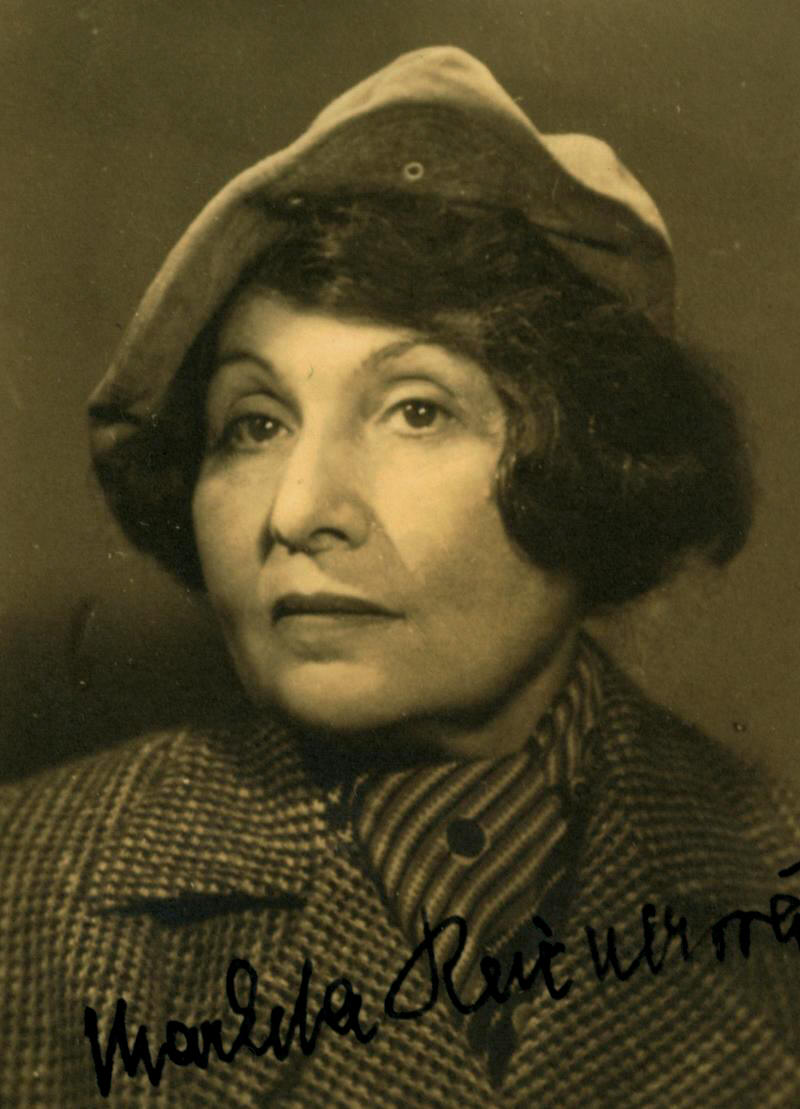
- Reiner in 1939
- Born: Grete Stein; November 20, 1885; Prague
- Died: March 8, 1944 (aged 58); Auschwitz
- Citizenship: Germany
- Occupations: Magazine editor and writer
- Spouse: Dr. Karel Reiner
- Writing career
- Pen name: Markéta Reinerová
- Notable work: Translation of The Good Soldier Schwejk

Grete Reiner (20 November 1885 – 8 March 1944) was an Austrian-Czech magazine editor and writer, who is notable for being the first translator of The Good Soldier Schwejk, the antimilitarist satirical novel by Jaroslav Hašek.

Her 1926 translation of Schwejk from the original Czech into German (or what was known as Prager Deutsch or Pražská Němčina) was highly prized by many including Bertolt Brecht and Erwin Piscator in Berlin, who used it as the basis for a play in 1928. Reiner's work, Die Abenteuer des braven Soldaten Schwejk was followed by an abridged English translation by Paul Selver in 1930.

Reiner was born in Prague under the name Grete Stein. After her second marriage to Dr. Karel Reiner (1897 – 1943), she was also known as Grete Reinerová (Czech name) or Markéta Reinerová, as well as Greta Reiner-Straschnow (because she had a son with her first husband JUDr. Oskar Straschnow, named Kurt (1911 – 1999)).

Reiner was executive editor of an anti-fascist émigré magazine in Prague called Deutsche Volkszeitung and was approached by Max Brod, editor of Franz Kafka's works, to translate The Good Soldier Schwejk. On its publication in 1921–23, Max Brod had immediately recognised Schwejk as a major work of literature, and had tried to translate a portion of it into German himself in the weeks following Hašek's death in 1923. Greta Reiner's full translation was published in 1926. Brod subsequently created a German play from the novel, collaborating with Hans Reimann.

According to the Biographia Judaica Bohemiae, on 22 December 1942, Grete Reiner was deported to the Sammellager in Terezín (Theresienstadt) as a result of the Nazi measures for the "final solution of the Jewish question", and from there on 6 September 1943, to KZ Auschwitz. Unless she fell victim to other abuse, Grete Reiner was gassed with the entire transport on the night of 8–9 March 1944.

Much of the scant information about Grete Reiner comes from another writer in Prague at the time called Lenka Reinerová (no relation), who became the grande dame of Prague's German-language literature. At the age of 19 Lenka was asked to take Greta Reiner's place as editor of Deutsche Volkszeitung and was the only member of her family to survive the Holocaust.
