= The Good Soldier Švejk =

1921–1923 novel by Jaroslav Hašek

- Author: Jaroslav Hašek
- Original title: Osudy dobrého vojáka Švejka za světové války
- Translator: Paul Selver, Cecil Parrott, Zdeněk "Zenny" K. Sadloň
- Cover artist: Josef Lada
- Language: Czech
- Genre: Satire, black comedy
- Set in: Central and Eastern Europe, 1914–15
- Publisher: Book 1: A. Sauer and V. Čermák Book 2: Jaroslav Hašek (distributor A. Synek) Books 3 & 4: Jaroslav Hašek's Estate (distributor A. Synek)
- Publication date: 1921–1923
- Publication place: Czechoslovakia
- English publication date: 1930 (Selver), 1973 (Parrott), 2000 (Sadlon)
- Media type: Print (Hardcover, Paperback) & Amazon Kindle
- Pages: 228
- Dewey Decimal: 891.8635
- Original text: Osudy dobrého vojáka Švejka za světové války at Czech Wikisource
- Translation: The Good Soldier Švejk at Wikisource

The Good Soldier Švejk (Note: Also spelled Schweik, Shveyk or Schwejk) (pronounced [ˈʃvɛjk]) is an unfinished satirical novel by Czech writer Jaroslav Hašek, published in 1921–1923, about a good-humored, simple-minded, middle-aged man who appears to be enthusiastic to serve Austria-Hungary in World War I.

The Good Soldier Švejk is the abbreviated title; the original Czech title of the work is Osudy dobrého vojáka Švejka za světové války (The Fateful Adventures of the Good Soldier Švejk During the World War). The book is the most translated novel of Czech literature, having been translated into over 50 languages.

== Publication ==
Hašek originally intended Švejk to cover a total of six volumes, but had completed only three (and started on the fourth) upon his death from heart failure on January 3, 1923.

The novel as a whole was originally illustrated (after Hašek's death) by Josef Lada and more recently by Czech illustrator Petr Urban.

The volumes are:

1. Behind the Lines (V zázemí, 1921)
2. At the Front (Na frontě, 1922)
3. The Glorious Licking (Slavný výprask, 1922)
4. The Glorious Licking Continues (Pokračování slavného výprasku, 1923; unfinished)

Following Hašek's death, journalist Karel Vaněk was asked by the publisher Adolf Synek to complete the unfinished novel. Vaněk finished the fourth book in 1923 and in the same year also released the fifth and the sixth volumes, titled Švejk in Captivity (Švejk v zajetí) and Švejk in Revolution (Švejk v revoluci). These later novels were not published until 1949. In 1991 volumes 5 and 6 were again released as Švejk in Russian Captivity and Revolution (Švejk v Ruském zajetí a v revoluci), in two volumes or combined.

== Background ==
The novel is set during World War I in Austria-Hungary, a multi-ethnic empire full of long-standing ethnic tensions. Fifteen million people died in the war, one million of them Austro-Hungarian soldiers, including around 140,000 who were Czechs. Hašek participated in this conflict and examined it in The Good Soldier Švejk.

Many of the situations and characters seem to have been inspired, at least in part, by Hašek's service in the 91st Infantry Regiment of the Austro-Hungarian Army. The novel also deals with broader anti-war themes: essentially a series of absurdly comic episodes, it explores the pointlessness and futility of conflict in general and of military discipline, Austrian military discipline in particular. Many of its characters, especially the Czechs, are participating in a conflict they do not understand on behalf of an empire to which they have no loyalty.

== Plot summary ==
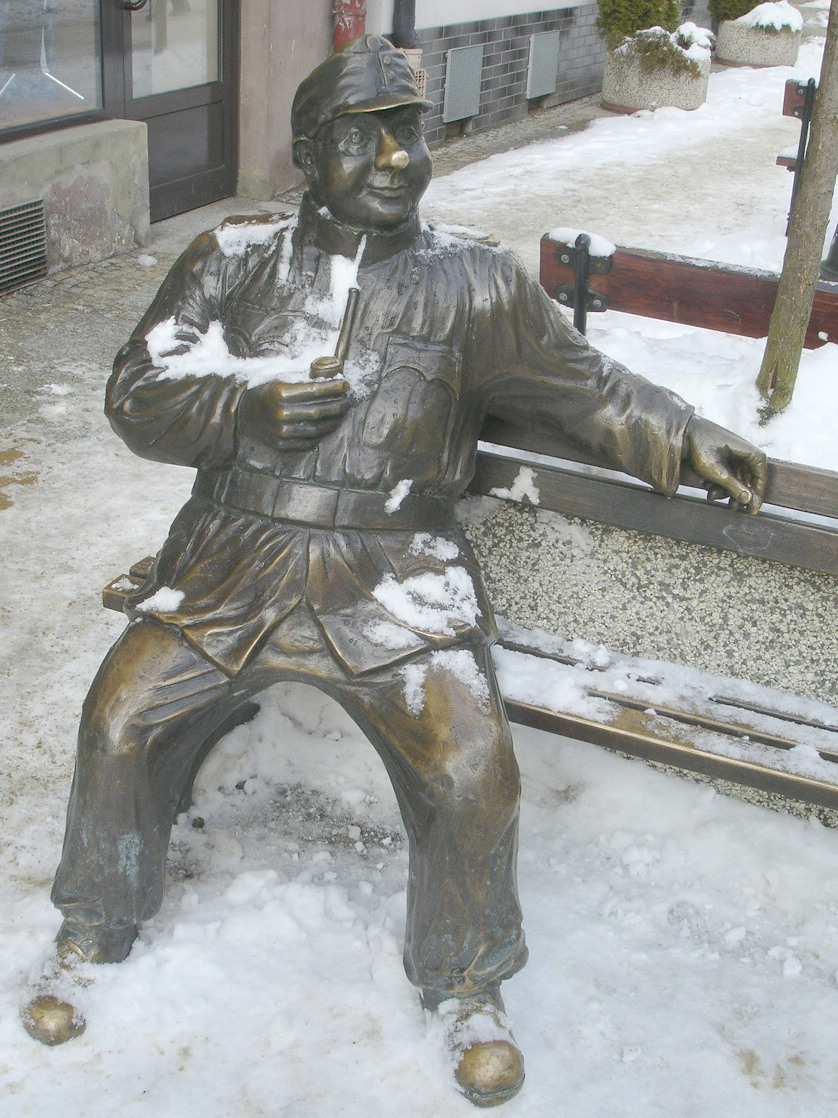
Statue of Josef Švejk in Sanok, Poland

The story begins in Prague with news of the assassination in Sarajevo that precipitates World War I.

Švejk displays such enthusiasm about faithfully serving the Austrian Emperor in battle that no one can decide whether he is merely an imbecile or is craftily undermining the war effort. He is arrested by a member of the state police, Bretschneider, after making some politically insensitive remarks, and is sent to prison. After being certified insane he is transferred to a madhouse, before being ejected.

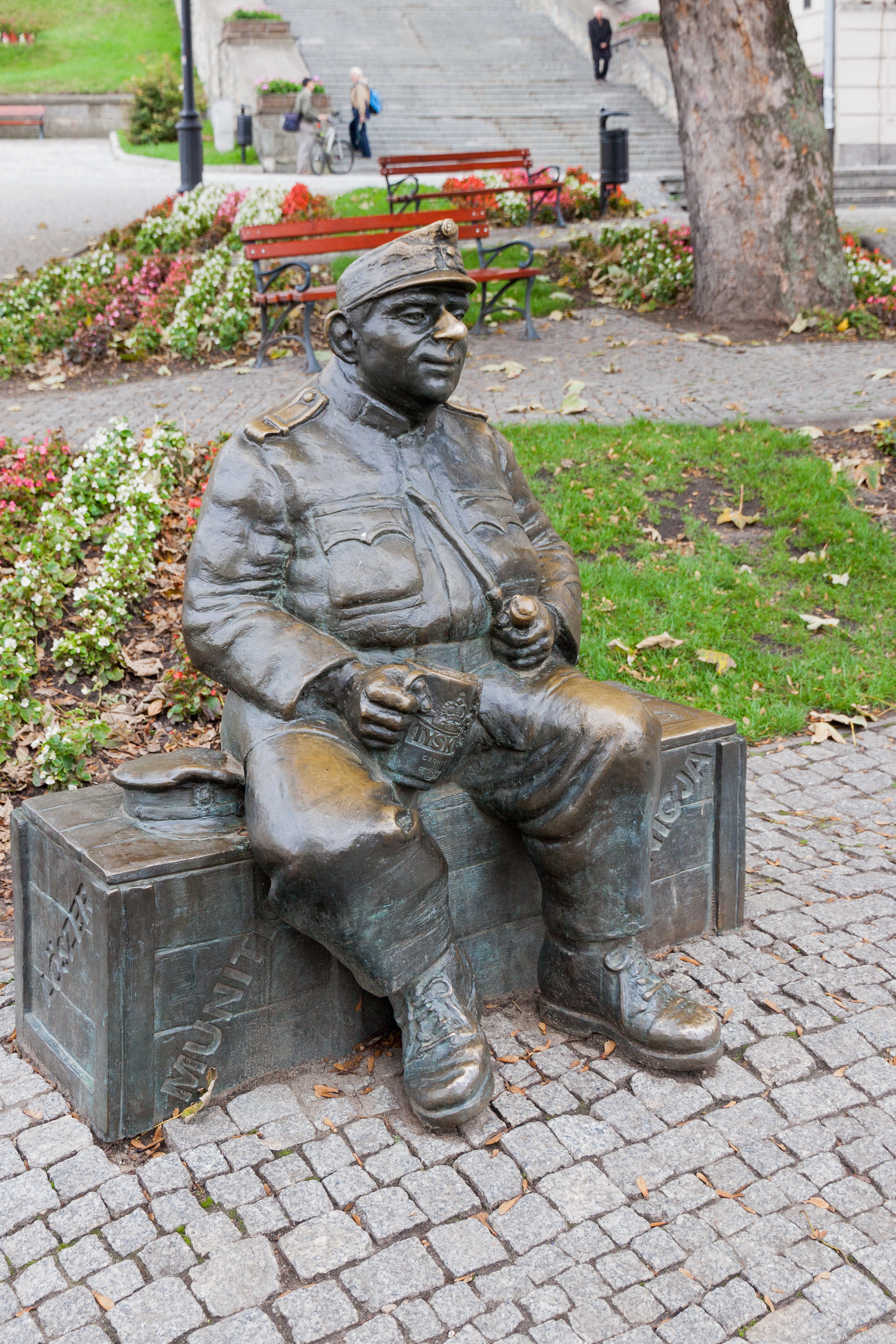
Statue of Josef Švejk in Przemyśl, Poland

Švejk gets his charwoman to wheel him (he claims to be suffering from rheumatism) to the recruitment offices in Prague, where his apparent zeal causes a minor sensation. He is transferred to a hospital for malingerers because of his rheumatism. He finally joins the army as batman to army chaplain Otto Katz. Katz is a Jew who avoids being sent to the front by pretending to be a priest. However, Katz loses Švejk in a bet over a game of cards to Senior Lieutenant Lukáš, whose batman he then becomes — which would eventually lead him to the front.

Lukáš is posted with his march battalion to barracks in České Budějovice, in Southern Bohemia, preparatory to being sent to the front. After missing all the trains to Budějovice, Švejk embarks on a long anabasis on foot around Southern Bohemia in a vain attempt to find Budějovice, before being arrested as a possible spy and deserter (a charge he strenuously denies) and escorted to his regiment.

The regiment is soon transferred to Bruck an der Leitha, a town on the border between Austria and Hungary. Here, where relations between the two nationalities are somewhat sensitive, Švejk is again arrested, this time for causing an affray involving a respectable Hungarian citizen and engaging in a street fight. He is also promoted to company orderly.

The unit embarks on a long train journey towards Galicia and the Eastern Front. Close to the front line, Švejk is taken prisoner by his own side as a suspected Russian deserter, after arriving at a lake and trying on an abandoned Russian uniform. Narrowly avoiding execution, he manages to rejoin his unit. The unfinished novel breaks off abruptly before Švejk has a chance to be involved in any combat or enter the trenches, though it appears Hašek may have conceived that the characters would have continued the war in a POW camp, much as he himself had done.

The book includes numerous anecdotes told by Švejk which are not directly related to the plot.

== Selected characters ==
The characters of The Good Soldier Švejk are generally either used as the butt of Hašek's absurdist humour or represent fairly broad social and ethnic stereotypes found in the Austro-Hungarian Empire at the time. People are often distinguished by the dialect and register of Czech or German they speak, a quality that does not translate easily. Many German- and Polish-speaking characters, for example, are shown as speaking comedically broken or heavily accented Czech, while many Czechs speak broken German; much use is also made of slang expressions.

Some characters are to varying degrees based on real people who served with the Imperial and Royal 91st Infantry Regiment, in which Hašek served as a one-year volunteer. (Much research has been conducted into this issue and the results are part of the catalog of all 585 people, both real and fictitious, that appear in the novel.)

Josef Švejk
The novel's hero: in civilian life a fence specializing in stolen dogs. Based partly on František Strašlipka, the young batman to Oberleutnant Rudolf Lukas, Hašek's company commander.
Palivec
The foul-mouthed landlord of Švejk's local pub – the "U Kalicha" ("At the Chalice") on Na Bojišti street, Prague. Despite refusal to discuss any politics ("it smells of Pankrác") Palivec is eventually arrested by Bretschneider (see below) after commenting that flies shit on the portrait of Franz Joseph in the pub.
Police Agent Bretschneider
A secret policeman who repeatedly tries to catch Švejk and others out on their anti-monarchist views. He is eventually eaten by his own dogs, after buying a succession of animals from Švejk in an attempt to incriminate him.
Staff Warder Slavík
A cruel and corrupt prison official (revealed to have himself ended up in prison under the Republic of Czechoslovakia).
Military chaplain Otto Katz
Has a fondness for drinking, especially communion wine, and gambling. Švejk seems fond of Katz, but the latter loses the services of Švejk to Lieutenant Lukáš in a game of cards.
Oberleutnant Lukáš
Švejk's long-suffering company commander. A Czech from South Bohemia, Lukáš is something of a womanizer but is depicted in a broadly sympathetic manner by Hašek (the records of the real-life 91st Regiment show an Oberleutnant Rudolf Lukas – the same rank as the character – at the time of Hašek's service; Hašek admired Lukas and even wrote him a number of poems. Lukas was Hašek's company commander.) Though Švejk's actions eventually lead to Lukáš' being labelled as a notorious philanderer in the Hungarian national press, he starts to miss Švejk after the latter is promoted to company orderly.
Colonel Friedrich Kraus von Zillergut
An idiotic Austrian officer with a penchant for giving his colleagues long-winded, moronic explanations of everyday objects (such as thermometers and postage stamps) and situations; run over by a cart while attempting to demonstrate what a pavement is. Kraus's dog is stolen by Švejk as a gift for Lukáš; the enraged colonel subsequently arranges Lukáš's transfer to the front.
Captain Ságner
One of the regiment's professional officers and commander of Švejk's march battalion; an ambitious careerist, he is later revealed to have been a closet Czech patriot in his youth. A Captain Vinzenz Sagner served in the 91st Regiment, where he was Hašek's battalion commander.
Colonel Schröder
The bad-tempered colonel of Švejk's regiment, and a caricature of typical German-speaking senior officers of the Austrian army.
Jurajda
The battalion's spiritualist cook; before military service he had edited an "occultist" journal. Spends time attempting to avoid frontline service through letters he is writing to his wife, in which he details meals he is intending to cook for senior officers.
2nd Lieutenant Dub
Dub is a Czech schoolmaster, reserve officer, and commander of the battalion's 3rd company: he has strongly monarchist views. As a conservative, pro-Habsburg Czech, Dub is the subject of some of Hašek's most vicious satire. Repeatedly placed in humiliating situations, such as being found drunk in a brothel or falling off a horse. (In all Slavonic languages the word dub ("oak") itself is a common synonym for a dull, idiotic person.) He is said to have been based on a lieutenant of the reserve, Mechálek, who served in Hašek's regiment. The novel is ended by words of Lieutenant Dub: "With the district governor, we always said: Patriotism, loyalty to duty, self-overcoming, these are the real weapons in war! I remember this especially today, when our troops will cross the border in the foreseeable future."
Quartermaster Sergeant-Major Vaněk
Another recurring character, Vaněk (a chemist from Kralupy nad Vltavou in civilian life) is an example of an easy-going but self-serving senior NCO, whose main concern is to make his own existence as comfortable as possible. A Jan Vaněk served in Hašek's regiment, and has some traits in common with the figure from the novel (domicile and occupation).
Volunteer Marek
The character of one-year volunteer Marek is to some degree a self-portrait by the author, who was himself a one-year volunteer in the 91st. For example, Marek – like Hašek – was editor of a natural history magazine. Marek is appointed the battalion historian by Ságner and occupies himself with devising memorable and heroic deaths in advance for his colleagues.
First-Class Private Vodička
A sapper friend of Švejk noted mainly for his extreme hatred of Hungarians, which leads to an unfortunate incident in Bruck an der Leitha.
Lieutenant Biegler (Cadet Biegler)
Biegler is a young junior officer with pretensions to nobility, despite being the middle-class son of a furrier. Biegler takes his military duties so seriously that he is ridiculed even by his senior officers, and is mistakenly hospitalised as a "carrier of cholera germs" after medical staff misdiagnose (for army PR reasons) a cognac-induced hangover. Cadet Biegler also had a real-life model in the 91st regiment (Cadet Johann Biegler, later lieutenant).
Captain Tayrle
The brigade adjutant and a particularly disgusting example of a headquarters officer, whose interests appear to lie mainly in crude jokes and sampling of local prostitutes.
General Fink von Finkenstein
An aristocratic, vicious and near-insane senior Austrian officer and commander of the garrison fort of Przemyśl, Fink treats his men with extreme brutality. He almost succeeds in having Švejk executed after the latter is taken prisoner by his own side. His name and look in 1958 film is based on Prussian general Karl Fink von Finkenstein.
Chaplain Martinec
A chaplain plagued by drink-induced spiritual doubts, whose attempt to provide spiritual consolation to Švejk ends in disaster.
"Sergeant Teveles"
A man in possession of a silver Military Merit Medal, purchased from a Bosnian, and claiming to be a Sergeant Teveles, who had previously disappeared along with the entire 6 March Company during fighting in Belgrade.
Private Baloun
A miller from Český Krumlov in civilian life, and Švejk's successor as Lukáš's batman, Baloun is a glutton and is regularly punished for stealing Lukáš's food. He eats raw dough, sausage skins, etc., when nothing else is available.

== Reception ==
According to John Willett in his 1959 book The Theatre of Bertolt Brecht, Brecht, in an unpublished note, said of The Good Soldier Švejk: “If anyone asks me to pick three literary works of this century which in my opinion will become part of world literature, then I would have to say one of them is Hašek’s The Good Soldier Švejk.”.

A number of literary critics consider The Good Soldier Švejk to be one of the first anti-war novels, predating Erich Maria Remarque's All Quiet on the Western Front. Joseph Heller said that if he had not read The Good Soldier Švejk, he would never have written his own anti-war satire Catch-22.

JP Stern quotes critic Macdonald Daly as saying of The Good Soldier Svejk:

...the only genuine popular creation of modern European literature; popular in the sense of immediately appealing to unliterary and relatively unsophisticated readers; popular in the sense of being modelled on them; and popular in the sense of being the product of an unliterary, naive creative imagination. Svejk’s immediate grip on the imagination of the new Czechoslovak Republic was revealed by a number of plays of the 1920s which stole the character and transplanted him to often bizarre new situations: Svejk Has Twins, Svejk as a Football Player, even Svejk on Mars! But Svejk endures transplantation across time as well as across space. In a Europe in which a major empire has so recently dissolved under the impetus of popular discontent, Hasek’s hero speaks to us of the value and importance of being ordinary. He teaches us that those who make history are usually not aiming to make history.

Sue Arnold, writing in The Guardian, stated:

"Every harassed negotiator, every beleaguered political wife and anyone given to ever-increasing moments of melancholy at the way things are should keep a copy of Hasek's classic 'don't let the bastards get you down' novel to hand. It's anti-war, anti-establishment, anti-religion and - praise indeed - even funnier than Catch-22."

== Broader cultural influence ==
The seeming idiocy and suspected subversion of Švejk has entered the Czech language in the form of words such as švejkovina (an instance or a result of "švejking"), švejkovat ("to švejk"), švejkárna (svejkardom [shvey-cardəm]) — situational and systemic absurdity), etc. The name has also entered the English dictionary, in the form of Schweik, "A person likened to the character of Schweik, pictured as an unlucky and simple-minded but resourceful little man oppressed by higher authorities," and the derivative forms to Schweik, Schweikism, and Schweikist.

In the British television documentary Hollywood (1979), a history of American silent films, director Frank Capra claimed the screen character of comedian Harry Langdon, which Capra helped to formulate, was partially inspired by The Good Soldier Švejk.

At Prague's NATO summit in 2002, a man dressed as the Good Soldier and using Svejk's typical crutches to support himself, appeared at an anti-alliance protest, shouting at the top of his voice: "To Baghdad, Mrs Muller, to Baghdad...", showing just how deep the character is etched on the Czech psyche.

== Adaptations and sequels ==
Švejk is the subject of films, plays, an opera, a musical, comic books, and statues, even the theme of restaurants in a number of European countries. The novel is also the subject of an unpublished operetta by Peter Gammond. Švejk has many statues and monuments, for example, at Humenné in Slovakia; Przemyśl and Sanok in Poland; St. Petersburg, Omsk, and Bugulma in Russia and Kyiv, Lviv, and Donetsk in Ukraine. In Kraków, there is a plaque on a building where the author was imprisoned for 7 days for vagrancy by the Austrian authorities. There has been speculation that Hašek got the idea for Švejk at that time, based on one of his fellow prisoners in the jail. The first statue of Švejk in the Czech Republic was unveiled in August 2014, in the village of Putim in South Bohemia.

=== Film ===
- 1931: Martin Frič films The Last Bohemian, a black-and-white comedy based on the novel, starring Saša Rašilov as Švejk.
- 1943: Schweik's New Adventures, alternative title It Started at Midnight, directed by Karel Lamac.
- 1955: The Czech animator Jiří Trnka adapts the novel as the animated film The Good Soldier Schweik, consisting of three episodes, with Jan Werich starring as the narrator.
- 1956–57: The Good Soldier Schweik – The most famous film adaptation. Czech film director Karel Steklý depicts the adventures of Švejk in two color films, starring Rudolf Hrušínský as the title character. It was nominated for the 1957 Crystal Globe Awards.
- 1960: In West Germany the book was adapted to black-and-white film The Good Soldier Schweik starring Heinz Rühmann.
- 1962: Velká cesta ("The Long Journey") is a Czechoslovak-Soviet black-and-white co-production film, made at Mosfilm studios in Moscow, recounting parts of Hašek's life that inspired much of The Good Soldier Švejk. It stars Josef Abraham as Jaroslav Hašek and is directed by Jurij Ozerov.
- 1986: Czechoslovak puppetoon version Osudy dobrého vojáka Švejka (The Fateful Adventures of the Good Soldier Schweik) appears.
- 2009: The Good Soldier Shweik, animated film, United Kingdom/Ukraine, written by Robert Crombie and directed by Rinat Gazizov and Manyk Depoyan.
- 2018: The Good Soldier Schwejk, British film, made at Sands Films, directed by Christine Edzard.

=== TV ===
- 1965: BBC 60 minute television adaptation The Good Soldier Schweik starring Kenneth Colley, John Collin and Felix Felton.
- 1967–68: In Finland the book was adapted for television as a ten-part black-and-white series called The Good Soldier Schweik (Kunnon sotamies Svejkin seikkailuja), starring Matti Varjo in the eponymous role.
- 1972: A 13-part Austrian TV series in color, The Adventures of the Good Soldier Schwejk (Die Abenteuer des braven Soldaten Schwejk), directed by Wolfgang Liebeneiner, is made and broadcast by the Austrian state TV (ORF). The title role is played by Fritz Muliar.

=== Other ===
- 1927–1928: Piscatorbühne, Nollendorfplatz, Berlin. The Adventures of the Good Soldier Schwejk stage play adapted from Hašek's novel by Max Brod, Hans Reimann, Erwin Piscator, Felix Gasbarra, and Bertolt Brecht, with sets by George Grosz.
- 1935: Arthur Koestler mentions in his autobiography that in 1935 he was commissioned by Willy Münzenberg, the Comintern propagandist, to write a novel called The Good Soldier Schweik Goes to War Again. He adds that the project was cancelled by the Communist Party when half the book had been written due to what they termed the book's "pacifist errors". Writing in 1954, Koestler stated that "about a hundred pages of the manuscript survive, and are in parts quite funny, in a coarsely farcical manner". However, Koestler – by then a staunch anti-Communist – never tried to get it published.
- 1943: Bertolt Brecht writes Schweik in the Second World War, a play which continues the adventures of Švejk into World War II.
- 1958: Robert Kurka's The Good Soldier Schweik premieres at the New York City Opera.
- 1986: RTÉ Radio 1 broadcasts Švejk — An Dea-Shaighdiúir, a six-part radio adaptation in Irish by Breandán Ó hEithir.
- 2002: Sotha of the Café de la Gare writes a play, The Good Soldier Schweik goes to Heaven (Le Brave Soldat Chvéïk s'en va au Ciel), based on novel.
- 2008: BBC Radio 4 broadcasts a two-part radio adaptation starring Sam Kelly.
- 2017–2018: "The Good Soldier Schwejk", a stage play, United Kingdom, written and direct by Christine Edzard, produced by Sands Films

== Translations ==
The Good Soldier Švejk is the most translated novel of Czech literature (58 languages in 2013). Excerpts from the first chapter, translated into German by Max Brod as Der Brave Soldat Schwejk, were published two days after Hašek's death in the Prague German language paper Prager Tagblatt on January 5, 1923. Following Max Brod's first steps toward a German translation, he introduced the book to Grete Reiner, executive editor of the anti-fascist magazine Deutsche Volkszeitung. Her translation of Švejk into German in 1926 was largely responsible for the speedy dissemination of Švejk's fame across Europe. It was one of the books burned by the National Socialists in 1933. Her translation was said to be one of Bertolt Brecht's favourite books. Reiner was murdered in Auschwitz on 9 March 1944. After the war, many other translations followed and Švejk became the most famous Czech book abroad.

=== English translations ===
Three English-language translations of Švejk have been published:

1. The Good Soldier Schweik, tr. Paul Selver, 1930 (Abridged and bowdlerised)
2. The Good Soldier Švejk and His Fortunes in the World War, illustrated by Josef Lada, translated and introduced by Cecil Parrott, first published by William Heinemann in association with Penguin books, 1973; numerous reprints: ISBN 0-14-018274-8, 978-0-14-044991-4, First included, with Bibliography and Chronology by Robert Pynsent (15 pages), in Everyman's Library (volume 151), London, 1993, 800 pages. ISBN 1-85715-151-8.
3. The Fateful Adventures of the Good Soldier Švejk During the World War, tr. Zdeněk "Zenny" K. Sadloň (and the first edition of Book One collaborator Emmett Joyce), in three volumes, 1998-2026
  - First Edition - 1998 Book One as an EVY and later PDF file; in 2000 Book One paperback, 1stBooks ISBN 1585004286, 978-1585004287, in 2010 Book Two, AuthorHouse ISBN 1438916701, 978-1438916705 and Book(s) Three & Four, AuthorHouse 1438916779, 978-1438916774.
  - The Centennial Edition, tr. Zdeněk "Zenny" K. Sadloň, Keenan, Sadlon & Lord Inc., 2024; Book One (5x8) (IngramSpark: ISBN 979-8218487089, (no longer distributed), Amazon 979-8327723146 (no longer distributed), 2026, Book One (6x9, expanded apparatus), IngramSpark ISBN 979-8994308417, Amazon 979-8994308417, 2026, Book Two (6x9, expanded apparatus), IngramSpark ISBN 979-8994308424, Amazon 979-8994308424, 2026, Book(s) Three & Four (6x9, expanded apparatus), IngramSpark ISBN 979-8994308431, Amazon 979-8994308431 ,

The first English translation, by Paul Selver, was heavily abridged, reducing the novel to about two thirds of its original length. Selver's translation also bowdlerized the original text, omitting paragraphs and occasionally pages that may have seemed offensive; despite this he has been praised for preserving some of the tension in the work between Literary and Common Czech. Cecil Parrott, former British ambassador to Czechoslovakia, produced the first unabridged translation of the work. Parrott is a rather literal translator, sometimes unimaginatively so. This literalness and uncertain command of English slang registers sometimes leads Parrott into awkward-sounding English. The translation by Sadloň (and the first edition of Book One collaborator Joyce) is the latest, an American, "illuminating translation" by a native Czech speaker.

== See also ==
- Czech literature
- Ivan Chonkin, a Soviet Švejk
- No Time for Sergeants, an American novel of related theme
- Catch-22
- Mandel Karlsson
- Kannoneer Jabůrek
- Rusty Bugles
