= André Weinfeld =

American film director

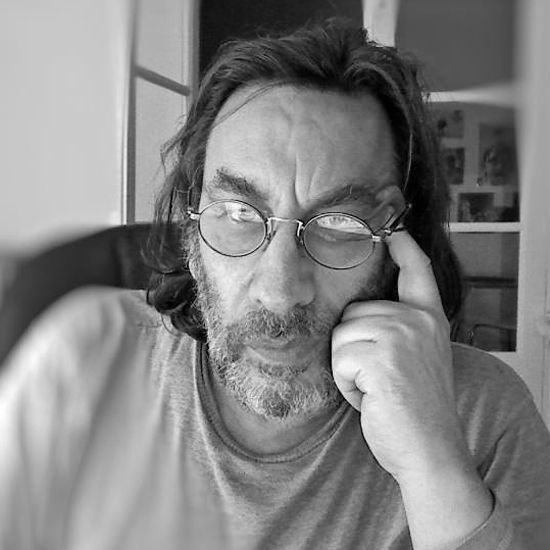
- Weinfeld in 2013
- Born: 6 April 1947 (age 79); Paris, France
- Education: Lycée Louis-le-Grand; Sorbonne University
- Occupations: Director, writer, producer, cinematographer, photographer
- Spouses: Raquel Welch (m. 1980; div. 1990) Jaimie Lilly (m. 1992; div. 1999)
- Awards: London Film Festival (1976); Best Feature Short; La Bonne Nouvelle

André Weinfeld (born 6 April 1947) is a French and American film and television producer, director, screenwriter, cinematographer, photographer, and journalist.

== Early life ==
André Weinfeld is the son of Jean Weinfeld, a Bauhaus architect.

After receiving a master's degree in psychology and French literature at the Sorbonne University, Weinfeld was admitted to the French film school Institut des hautes études cinématographiques (IDHEC).

== French career ==
Weinfeld worked initially as a camera operator and then as a Cinematographer for several "French New Wave" short and full-length feature films, including collaborating with, among others, directors Philippe Garrel, Jean Eustache, Néstor Almendros, Dennis Berry, and Jackie Raynal. At age 19, Weinfeld became one of the youngest television directors and producers in France.

For the next 10 years, Weinfeld directed, produced and reported over 70 weekly news and documentary magazine programs and French Network Specials, including reports on fashion and the 1960s and 1970s rock and roll and pop scenes in "Swinging London" and in the US for the TV show "Bouton Rouge" at the Monterey International Pop Festival, the Woodstock Festival, working with many major musicians, among them Jimi Hendrix, The Beatles, The Rolling Stones, Cream, The Who, Pink Floyd and Johnny Hallyday. Later on, this time as a War correspondent, Weinfeld accepted several assignments to Israel, Syria, Egypt and Lebanon during the Six-Day War, the Yom Kippur War and Saigon during the Vietnam War.

After serving for one year as a director of several feature and documentary films during his military service in the French Army Cinema Service (ECPA), André Weinfeld joined the McCann Erickson advertising agency in 1974 for a two-year stint as creative director and in 1976 went on to write and direct his first feature short La Bonne Nouvelle (The Good News), with late "French New Wave" director Claude Chabrol, Thomas Chabrol, Christine Boisson, Michel Duchaussoy, Mary Marquet and Daniel Prévost, which was awarded the Grand Prize at the International London Film Festival and thereafter distributed in France by Warner-Columbia.

Weinfeld then worked as a screenwriter for several French Films, among them La Clé sur la porte (1978) starring French actors Patrick Dewaere and Annie Girardot.

== American career ==
In 1977, Weinfeld met actress Raquel Welch in Paris, and decided to move to Hollywood to join her. Weinfeld then started his own Production and Video Distribution Company while producing, writing and directing "From Raquel With Love" (1980), a variety show TV Special with Raquel Welch, Mickey Rooney and Douglas Fairbanks Jr.

Weinfeld then went on to produce all of Raquel Welch's National Tour and Live Concerts in Las Vegas, Lake Tahoe and Atlantic City and subsequently co-produced the Broadway Musical Woman of the Year by Fred Ebb and John Kander.

His work as a Commercial and Editorial Photographer for the Sygma Corbis news agency has appeared worldwide on the covers and in the pages of Life, Newsweek, Time, Vogue, Harper's Bazaar, Playboy, and others. His photographs have also been chosen to represent Hasselblad's renowned professional camera products in one of that company's recent international advertising campaigns. In 1984, he published and photographed Welch's fitness book Total Beauty and Fitness and produced and directed her collection of fitness and yoga videos.

== Personal life ==
Having met actress Raquel Welch in Paris in 1977, Weinfeld decided to move to Hollywood to join her. They married in 1980 and divorced in 1990. Weinfeld has a son by his second marriage to Jaimie Lilly, whom he divorced in 1999.
