= Koretzky =

Koretzky is a surname. Notable people with the surname include:

- Clément Koretzky (born 1990), French cyclist
- Nicolas Koretzky (born 1972), French actor
- Victor Koretzky (born 1994), French mountain biker
