= Tara Römer =

French actor

- Born: June 7, 1974; Lavelanet, Ariège, France
- Died: November 24, 1999 (aged 25); Paris
- Occupation: Actor

Tara Römer (7 June 1974, in Lavelanet – 24 November 1999, in Paris) was a French actor. He starred in the film Life Is a Long Quiet River (1988).

== Career ==
At age 14, Römer made his first debut in 1988 alongside Benoît Magimel in Life Is a Long Quiet River playing Million Groseille. In 1995 after graduation, he returned to the cinema playing Laurent in Thomas Gilou's Raï.

After spending years appearing in films and TV films, Römer appeared in a short film Jour de manque shot collection before a posthumous release in 2000.

== Death ==
While riding a scooter, Römer was involved in a road accident in the 12th arrondissement of Paris on the edge of Bois de Vincennes and died on 24th November 1999. His last film Elle et lui au 14e étage was released in 2000 and dedicated to his memory.

== Selected filmography ==
Year	Title	Role	Director
1988	Life Is a Long Quiet River	Million Groseille	Étienne Chatiliez
1995	Raï	Laurent	Thomas Gilou
1995	Le Plus bel âge	Michel	Didier Haudepin
1995	Total Eclipse	Arthur Rimbaud (voice; French dubbed version)	Agnieszka Holland
1997	Bouge !	Grégoire	Jérôme Cornuau
1998	Taxi	Émilien's colleague	Gérard Pirès
1999	A Monkey's Tale	Kom (voice)	Jean-François Laguionie
1999	The Messenger: The Story of Joan of Arc	Gamaches	Luc Besson
2000	Elle et lui au 14e étage	Romain (posthumous)	Sophie Blondy
