= Bye, See You Monday =

1979 film

- French: Au revoir... à lundi
- Directed by: Maurice Dugowson
- Written by: Jacques Dugowson; Maurice Dugowson; Roger Fournier
- Produced by: Nicole Boisvert; Michelle de Broca
- Starring: Miou-Miou
- Cinematography: François Protat
- Edited by: Jean-Bernard Bonis
- Music by: Lewis Furey; Jean-Daniel Mercier
- Distributed by: Les Artistes Associés
- Release date: 22 August 1979
- Running time: 104 minutes
- Countries: Canada; France
- Language: French

Bye, See You Monday (French: Au revoir... à lundi) is a 1979 French-Canadian drama film directed by Maurice Dugowson. It was entered into the 12th Moscow International Film Festival.

== Plot ==
A French film based on a Canadian novel (by Roger Fournier) about two Montreal women (Carole Laure and Miou-Miou) in their late twenties who share an apartment and are involved in separate love affairs with married men. Their few pleasures are diminished by the disappointments they must suffer in these unequal relationships.

== Cast ==
- Miou-Miou as Nicole
- Carole Laure as Lucie Leblanc
- Claude Brasseur as Arnold Samson
- David Birney as Frank
- Gabriel Arcand as Georges, le barman
- Alain Montpetit as Jack Davis
- Frank Moore as Robert Lanctôt
- Denise Filiatrault as Dame de compagnie aérienne
- Renée Girard as Mere de Lucie
- Andrée Pelletier as Soeur de Lucie
- Murray Westgate as Pere de Lucie
- Raymond Cloutier as Hector, le beau-frère
