= Studio magazine =

French monthly magazine

Studio magazine, usually known as Studio, was a French cinema magazine that existed between 1987 and 2009.

== History ==
Studio magazine was founded in 1987 by part of the former editorial team of Première led by Marc Esposito and Jean-Pierre Lavoignat. Michel Rebichon was the editorial director, Béatrice Toulon the editor in chief, and Benoit Basirico was web editor. The first issue appeared in March 1987. The magazine was owned by Emap, Canal+ and UGC until 2004 when it was acquired by Roularta, a Belgian press group.

On the occasion of its twentieth anniversary in 2007 Studio magazine launched its internet site.

== Merger with Ciné Live ==
In December 2006, the publisher of Studio magazine, Roularta, purchased Ciné Live. On this occasion, they stated "This purchase allows the Roularta group to double their presence in the cinema market, Ciné Live has a very strong presence in the 15 – 25 market, which is a section of the cinema monthlies market that Studio magazine were seen to be missing by Emap in 2004. (...) Roularta has ambitions to merge the two magazines to reinforce their complementarity."

In January 2009, Studio magazine finished at issue 254. The two magazines fused to create Studio ciné live.

== See also ==
- List of film periodicals
