= Josip Kosor =

Croatian novelist and playwright

- Born: 27 January 1879; Tribounj, Kingdom of Dalmatia, Austria-Hungary (now Trbounje, Croatia)
- Died: 23 January 1961 (aged 81); Dubrovnik, SFR Yugoslavia (now Dubrovnik, Croatia)
- Occupation(s): playwright, novelist, poet

Josip Kosor (Croatian pronunciation: [jǒsip kǒsor]; 27 January 1879 – 23 January 1961) was a Croatian novelist, poet, and playwright. Starting as a novelist depicting peasant life in Dalmatia, Kosor "graduated into a naturalist dramatist of some power". He was nominated for the Nobel Prize in Literature three times.

His plays Passion's Furnace (1912), The Invincible Ship (1921), and Reconciliation (1923) were translated for performance in England.

== Works ==
- People of the universe: four Croatian plays. Translated by Paul Selver, F. S. Copeland and J. N. Duddington. London: Hendersons, 1917.
- White flames: poems translated (by the author) from Croatian, London: C. W. Daniel Co., 1929.
