= Les amitiés particulières (film) =

1964 French film

- Directed by: Jean Delannoy
- Written by: Jean Aurenche; Pierre Bost; Roger Peyrefitte (novel)
- Produced by: Christine Gouze-Rénal
- Starring: Francis Lacombrade; Didier Haudepin; François Leccia; Dominique Maurin
- Cinematography: Christian Matras
- Edited by: Louisette Hautecoeur
- Music by: Jean Prodromidès
- Production companies: Lux Film; Progéfi
- Distributed by: Pathé Contemporary Films (US)
- Release dates: 4 September 1964 (France); 7 November 1967 (U.S.)
- Running time: 100 minutes
- Country: France
- Language: French

Les amitiés particulières (English: Special Friendships) is a 1964 film adaptation of the Roger Peyrefitte novel of the same name, directed by Jean Delannoy. It was released in 1967 with English subtitles as This Special Friendship. It stars Francis Lacombrade and Didier Haudepin as boys at an upper-class Catholic boarding school, whose chaste but intimate friendship is discouraged as sinful by the priests (played by Louis Seigner, Michel Bouquet, and Lucien Nat).

== Plot ==
In 1912, 14-year-old Georges de Sarre enters Saint-Claude, a strict Catholic boarding school. He discovers clandestine relationships among students and forms a deep bond with 12-year-old Alexandre Motier. Their discreet friendship is initially threatened by Father Trennes, whom Georges exposes for misconduct. However, their correspondence is later discovered by Father Lauzon, who forces Georges to return Alexandre's love letters.

Heartbroken, Alexandre tears up Georges' letters during his train ride home and commits suicide by jumping from the moving carriage. At the funeral, Father Lauzon denies responsibility for the tragedy, while Georges secretly mourns his lost love, having written a final letter about their planned summer reunion. Director Delannoy frames the story as "emotions we experience on the threshold of adolescence," leaving the physical nature of their relationship ambiguous.

== Cast ==
- Francis Lacombrade as Georges de Sarre
- Didier Haudepin as Alexandre Motier
- François Leccia as Lucien Rouvère
- Gérard Chambre as André Ferron
- Dominique Maurin as Marc de Blajan
- Louis Seigner as Father Lauzon
- Michel Bouquet as Father Trennes
- Lucien Nat as Father Superior
- Dominique Diamant as Maurice Motier (Alexandre's brother)
- Colette Régis as The Nun
- Bernard Musson as Teaching Father

== Production ==
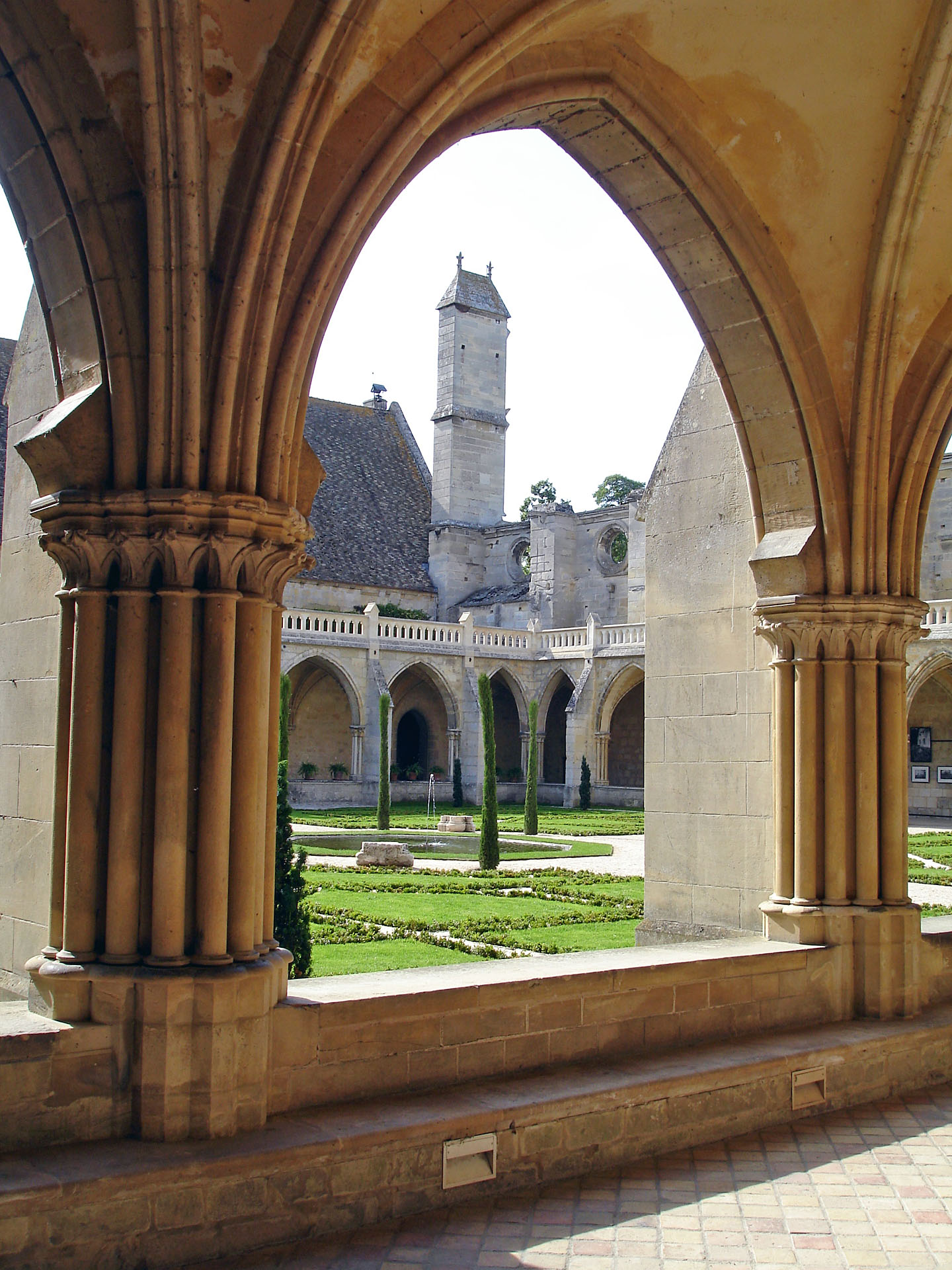
Cloister at Royaumont Abbey

The film was shot over six weeks at Royaumont Abbey, Senlis Cathedral, and Saint-Maurice studios. Producer Christine Gouze-Rénal (sister-in-law of future president François Mitterrand) secured locations despite initial resistance from the Catholic Church.

21-year-old Francis Lacombrade (Georges) and 12-year-old Didier Haudepin (Alexandre) formed a strong off-screen bond, with Haudepin later recalling Lacombrade's protective nature during filming. Author Roger Peyrefitte visited the set and began a controversial relationship with 12-year-old extra Alain-Philippe Malagnac, later chronicled in his memoirs.

The production faced early censorship challenges, with Catholic authorities attempting to block its release. A public feud erupted when novelist François Mauriac condemned the film in Le Figaro, prompting Peyrefitte to publish a scathing open letter outing Mauriac's repressed homosexuality in Arts magazine.

== Reception ==
The film premiered at the 14th Berlin International Film Festival in 1964 and represented France at the 1965 Venice Film Festival. Competing during a contentious Berlinale edition marked by artistic criticism and Cold War tensions, the festival jury chaired by Anthony Mann controversially awarded the Golden Bear to Dry Summer instead. Initial screenings faced institutional resistance, with Catholic groups pressuring for an under-18 viewing ban in France, though the restriction was later lifted after critical acclaim.

James Travers of Filmsdefrance.com praised the "raw edge, poetry and spiritual intensity" of the lead performances, noting the film's critique of societal hypocrisy. The October 1974 prime-time broadcast on Antenne 2, followed by a televised debate on forbidden loves, marked a cultural milestone in French LGBTQ+ representation.

Manga artist Moto Hagio cited the film as a key inspiration for her groundbreaking 1974 work The Heart of Thomas, particularly its exploration of adolescent emotional intensity.

== Soundtrack ==
- Pange lingua (choir)
- J.S. Bach: Invention No.13 in A minor, BWV 784 (piano)
- Alouette, gentille Alouette (train scene)
