= Sotha (actress) =

French actress (born 1944)

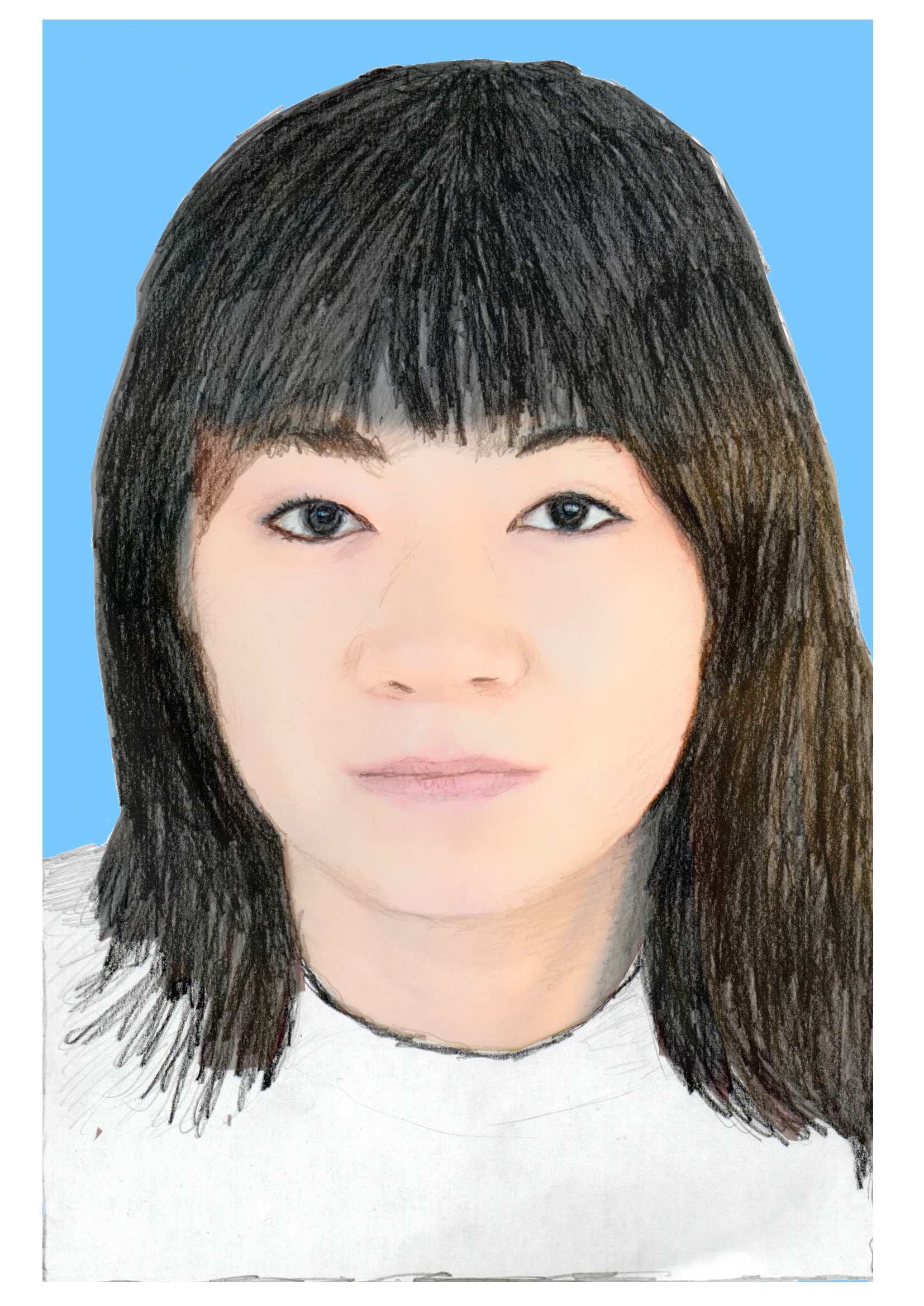
- Born: Catherine Sigaux; 1944 (age 81–82); Rozay-en-Brie, Seine-et-Marne
- Occupations: Actress, playwright, screenwriter, director, composer
- Spouses: Romain Bouteille; Patrick Dewaere (m. 1968; div. 1979)

Sotha (born 1944) is a French actress, playwright, screenwriter, film & stage director, and composer. Her real name is Catherine Sigaux. She was one of the founders of the Café de la Gare where she acted and co-wrote many of the plays.

She was twice married, both times to fellow actors from the Café de la Gare, first to Romain Bouteille, and then for 11 years to Patrick Dewaere. She is the daughter of novelist and journalist Gilbert Sigaux.

In 1981 Sotha published a novel in comic book format whose title roughly translates as "Look to the sky, it's going to rain." In 2002, she wrote a play, Le Brave Soldat Chvéïk s'en va au Ciel (The Good Soldier Schweik goes to Heaven), based on the famous satirical novel The Good Soldier Švejk by the Czech writer Jaroslav Hašek.

== Filmography ==
=== Actress ===
- Themroc (directed by Claude Faraldo, 1973)
- Le Graphique de Boscop (directed by Georges Dumoulin and Sotha, 1976)
- Vous n'aurez pas l'Alsace et la Lorraine (directed by Coluche and Marc Monnet, 1977)
- Si vous n'aimez pas ça, n'en dégoûtez pas les autres (directed by Raymond Lewin, 1978)
- Les Diplômés du dernier rang (directed by Christian Gion, 1982)
- Cross (directed by Philippe Setbon, 1987)
- Patrick Dewaere (as herself in a documentary directed by Marc Esposito, 1992)

=== Director ===
- Au long de rivière Fango (1974)
- Les matous sont romantiques (1974)
- Le graphique de boscop (co-directed with Georges Dumoulin, 1976)
- Pas besoin de valises (short film, 1983)
- Les œufs sur le plat (short film, 1984)
- Tant pis si je meurs (1988)

=== Writer ===
- Mon bel amour, ma déchirure (directed by José Pinheiro, 1987)
- La Chica (directed by Bruno Gantillon, 1996)
