= Le Péril jeune =

- Film poster
- Directed by: Cédric Klapisch
- Written by: Cédric Klapisch; Santiago Amigorena; Alexis Galmot; Daniel Thieux
- Produced by: Aïssa Djabri; Farid Lahouassa
- Starring: Romain Duris; Nicolas Koretzky; Joachim Lombard; Vincent Elbaz; Julien Lambroschini
- Cinematography: Dominique Colin
- Edited by: Francine Sandberg
- Music by: Joël Daydé
- Production companies: Gaumont; Vertigo; La Sept-Arte
- Distributed by: Gaumont Buena Vista International
- Release date: 28 February 1995
- Running time: 101 minutes
- Country: France
- Language: French
- Budget: $1.4 million
- Box office: $4.8 million

Le Péril jeune (French pronunciation: [ləpeʁil ʒœn]) or The Good Old Daze is a 1994 French coming of age comedy-drama directed by Cédric Klapisch. The movie takes place in Paris during the 1970s.

== Plot ==
Ten years after having left high school, four friends, Momo, Léon, Alain and Bruno meet for the birth of the child of their friend Tomasi, who recently died. Together they dwell on their mutual memories concerning their last year at their Parisian high school during the seventies. This includes demonstrations, first experiments with drugs and women and also the contents of the courses.

== Cast ==
- Romain Duris as Tomasi
  - A rebellious, hedonistic teenager. When Barbara's friends introduce him to drugs, he quickly turns into a self-destructive truant who hangs around most of his time in Barbara's squat. Still he hits on Sophie and befathers her with a child before he dies of a drug overdose.
- Julien Lambroschini as Bruno
  - Tomasi's best friend, and the most artistically talented of the group. He falls in love with Barbara and leads his friends into the squat where she lives with addicts. Due to this, and because he believes he could have saved Tomasi if only he had been a better friend, Bruno blames himself for Tomasi's death.
- Joachim Lombard as Léon Rouvel
  - The most politically conscious of the group and the brother of a high school dean. Their relationship is tense, especially because his brother was involved in the May 1968 events and accuses Léon's friends of just parroting catchphrases. (Only late Léon will admit he never understood what class struggle is actually about). As a Class President Léon is often torn between his friends and his responsibilities. He has a huge crush on fellow class president Christine (Hélène de Fougerolles), but doesn't dare to act upon it because her preppiness is the target of her friends' ridicule. That he will regret he later on.
- Nicolas Koretzky as Maurice 'Momo' Zareba
  - The son of a deaf-mute baker, with whom he has a strained relationship. While his father takes it for guaranteed that his son will become a baker too, Momo feels guilty for having other plans.
- Vincent Elbaz as Alain Chabert
  - A reckless teenager who concentrates on sports and parties. He is somewhat of a class clown, often irritating his friends who consider him immature. Within the group, Chabert is the only one who seems to retain his integrity throughout the movie.
- Lisa Faulkner as Barbara
  - A British student who came to France as an assistant English teacher. She dwells in a squat with a bunch of hippies, who indulge in heavy drug use (particularly LSD). She falls for Bruno but their relationship dissolves when she heads back to England.
- Julie-Anne Roth as Marie
  - a friend of the boys' who is committed to feminism. Yet she implies once being sexually harassed was flattering after all. She is very politically conscious, making their friends believe she and Léon will eventually become a couple. Léon later explains that this very expectation kept them from ever dating.
- Hélène de Fougerolles as Christine
- Élodie Bouchez as Sophie
- Caroline Damiens as Nora
- Coco Bouiller as Félicité
- Eric Andreini as Thierry
- Jackie Berroyer as Jo
- Caroline Proust as Squat girl
