= Dominique Collignon-Maurin =

French actor (1949–2025)

Dominique Collignon-Maurin (French: [dɔminik kɔliɲɔ̃ moʁɛ̃]; 1 April 1949 – 4 August 2025) was a French actor.

== Life and career ==
Dominique Collignon-Maurin was born in Toulouse on 1 April 1949. He was the son of the actress Mado Maurin and the composer Georges Collignon. He was the uncle of actor Emmanuel Karsen.

Throughout his career, he appeared in a number of films, including La Belle Américaine (1961), Les Amitiés particulières (1964), La Bande à Bonnot (1968), Neige (1981), Les Princes (1983), Zanzibar (1989), and Lune froide (1991). He was also the French dubbing actor for Mark Hamill, and was the French voice of Luke Skywalker in the Star Wars franchise.

Collignon-Maurin died on 4 August 2025, at the age of 76.
