= Mado Maurin =

French actress (1915–2013)

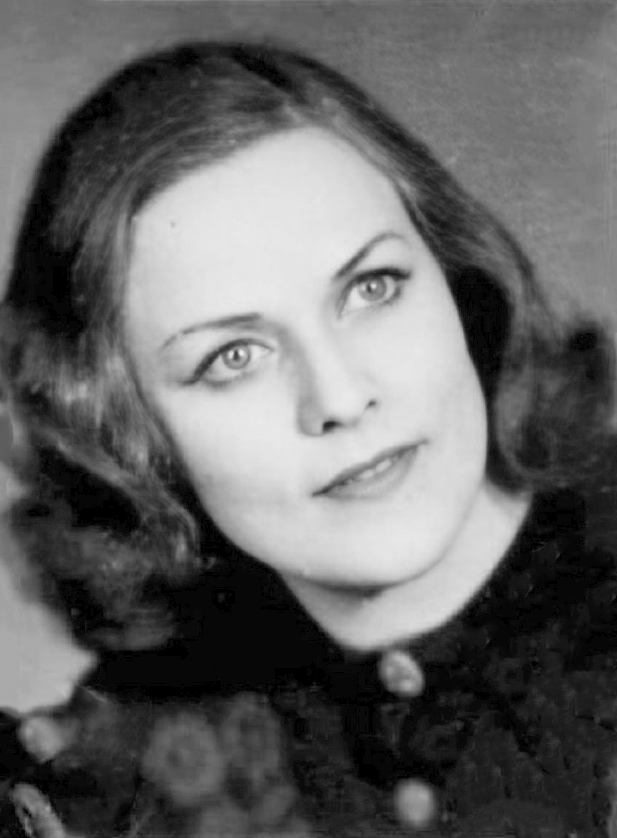
- Born: Madeleine Jeanne Louise Maurin; 24 September 1915; Paris, France
- Died: 8 December 2013 (aged 98); Paris, France
- Occupation: Actress
- Years active: 1955–2011
- Spouses: Pierre-Marie Bourdeaux; Georges Collignon
- Children: 6; including Dominique
- Relatives: Emmanuel Karsen (grandson)

Madeleine Jeanne Louise "Mado" Maurin (24 September 1915 − 8 December 2013) was a French actress, whose career spanned over 55 years.

== Personal life ==
Born in Paris, Maurin began her acting career in 1955. Maurin was married twice and was the mother of actors Jean-Pierre Maurin (1941−1996), Yves-Marie Maurin (1944−2009), Patrick Dewaere (1947−1982), Dominique Collignon-Maurin (1949-2025), Jean-François Vlérick (born 1957), and Marie-Véronique Maurin (born 1960).

Mado Maurin died of natural causes in Paris on 8 December 2013, at the age of 98.

== Partial filmography ==
- Le revolver et la rose (1970) - La mère de Catherine
- I Don't Know Much, But I'll Say Everything (1973) - La mère à la securité sociale
- I Am Pierre Riviere (1976) - La grand-mère
- Un si joli village (1979) - Elodie
- Le coup de sirocco (1979)
- The Woman Cop (1980) - Logeuse
- L'amour mensonge (1980) - La mère de Mathieu
- A Bad Son (1980) - La femme d'André
- Plein Sud (1981) - La concierge
- Légitime violence (1982)
- Les Misérables (1982) - La bonne de la rue Plumet
- Tout le monde peut se tromper (1983) - La première invitée du mariage
- Si elle dit oui... je ne dis pas non (1983) - La mamma
- Sandy (1983) - Madeleine
- Le joli coeur (1984) - Concierge
- Rebelote (1984) - Mme No, la nourrice
- Viva la vie (1984) - François's Mother
- La Garce (1984) - Madame Pasquet
- Train d'enfer (1985)
- Les mois d'avril sont meurtriers (1987) - La concierge de Clara
- Les cigognes n'en font qu'à leur tête (1989) - La surveillante
- Le crime d'Antoine (1989) - La voisine
- The Favour, the Watch and the Very Big Fish (1991) - Old Lady in Park
- Le cahier volé (1992) - La mère supérieure
- La poudre aux yeux (1995) - La mère d'Arnold
- The Car Keys (1995) - La dame en blanc
- Burnt Out (1995) - Patronne de l'hôtel
- Sous les toits de Paris (2007) - La mère de Thérèse
- R.I.F. (2011) - La mère de Jorelle (final film role)
