= F comme Fairbanks =

1976 film

- Film poster
- Directed by: Maurice Dugowson
- Written by: Maurice Dugowson; Jacques Dugowson
- Produced by: Jean-Paul Gibon; Michel Seydoux
- Starring: Patrick Dewaere; Miou-Miou
- Cinematography: André Diot
- Edited by: Jean-Bernard Bonis
- Music by: Patrick Dewaere; Roland Vincent
- Distributed by: Gaumont Dostribution
- Release date: 5 May 1976
- Running time: 110 minutes
- Country: France
- Language: French

F comme Fairbanks is a 1976 French drama film directed by Maurice Dugowson. It was entered into the 26th Berlin International Film Festival.

== Cast ==
- Patrick Dewaere – André
- Miou-Miou – Marie
- John Berry – Fragman
- Michel Piccoli – Etienne
- Jean-Michel Folon – Jean-Pierre
- Christiane Tissot – Sylvie
- Diane Kurys – Annick
- Jean Lescot – Jeannot le régisseur
- Jean de Coninck – Le photographe
- Evane Hanska – Françoise
- Thierry Lhermitte – Le jeune cadre
- Guiguin Moro – L'assistante
- Christian Clavier – Le serveur
- Yves Barsacq – Le vieux cadre
- Jenny Clève – La grand-mère
- Marc Lamole – Le patron du bistrot
