= A Monkey's Tale =

- French theatrical release poster
- Directed by: Jean-François Laguionie
- Written by: Norman Hudis; Jean-François Laguionie
- Starring: Tara Römer; Nadia Farès; Pierre Arditi; Jean Piat; Yves Barsacq
- Music by: Alexandre Desplat
- Production companies: Steve Walsh Productions; Les Films du Triangle; Cologne Cartoon; La Fabrique; Entertainment Rights plc Kecskemétfilm; France 3 Cinéma; British Sky Broadcasting; Canal+
- Distributed by: Miracle Communications (United Kingdom) mk2 Films (France); MFA+ Filmdistribution (Germany)
- Release date: 2 June 1999
- Running time: 75 minutes
- Countries: United Kingdom; France; Germany
- Languages: English; French; German

A Monkey's Tale (French: Le Château des singes; literally "The Castle of Monkeys") is a feature-length animated film directed by Jean-François Laguionie. It was released in 1999, and won the Award for Best Animated Feature Film at the fifth Kecskemét Animation Film Festival. It was released theatrically in the UK by Miracle Communications in its original English-language version in 2000, featuring the voices of Rik Mayall, John Hurt, Michael York, Sally Anne Marsh, and Michael Gambon. It was initially going to be released straight-to-video in the US by Universal Pictures, but for unknown reasons, it never materialized. Instead in 2000, The Harvey Entertainment Company acquired funding rights to the film, with television distribution rights going to Pearson Television International. A sequel titled The Prince's Voyage was produced in 2019.

== Plot ==
A narrator speaks that long ago, an earthquake separated a tribe of monkeys. One group escaped the flood brought on by the quake by climbing to the top of the trees while the other clung to the roots. In the flood's wake, the single tribe becomes two with mutual suspicion and fear of each other maintaining the divide.

Kom is a member of the Woonkos, the tribe of monkeys residing in the tree canopy, who live in obsessive fear of falling into the world below which they believe to be inhabited by demons. Kom refuses to believe these superstitions and dismisses the warnings of both his older brother, Gavin, and the paranoid elder of the Woonkos. However, on the way home, he accidentally falls from the trees into the land below. He is saved by the king of the Lankoos who have developed into a medieval-themed culture with a similar level of scientific knowledge, but equal levels of superstition and prejudice towards their Woonko cousins whom they believe to be savages. While at the King's castle, Kom befriends and falls for Gina, a young maid, while the castle librarian, Master Martin, teaches him to behave as a Lankoo while also teaching him about academic topics such as astronomy. The King is amused by Kom's attitude and impressed by the various cries his people use to communicate, prompting the King to make Kom his jester, although Gina gets annoyed when he tries too hard for popularity, and forgets her, prompting her to break off their relationship. Kom briefly attempts to return home, only for the King to remind him that he isn't a prisoner of the Lankoos, prompting Kom to return and reconcile with Gina.

Meanwhile, the King's royal chancellor Sebastian, the governess to the King's daughter, Princess Ida, and their dim-witted side-kick, Gerard the Gormless, plot to kill the king while slowly poisoning Ida. During a cold spell, the lake which the Lankoos believed to be cursed, freezes over and the king leads his army to cross it in order to reach the "promised land" on the other side of the lake. Unfortunately, the ice melts and the king and his army all drown while Kom survives with one other soldier named Lionel. Sebastian believes his plan has worked and moves to claim the throne. Gina discovers the nefarious plot and escapes from Sebastian, the governess and Gerard before reuniting with Kom and Lionel.

While Gina and Lionel search for the missing princess, Kom escapes from Sebastian and the angry mob where he returns to his home tribe. There, Kom briefly reunites with Gavin before going back to stop Sebastian. Gina and Lionel stop and subdue the governess from poisoning Ida before administering an antidote to the princess which Kom had heard of from the Woonko elder. As Kom interrupts Sebastian's coronation, Ida recovers from the effects of the poison and claims the throne before Sebastian can. Sebastian attempts to escape, but is pursued by Kom who subdues him after a fight while Lionel does the same to Gerard. With Sebastian and Gerard imprisoned, Ida becomes the new queen. Kom and Gina return to the land of the Woonkos, with the implication that the two tribes will learn to know each other once more.

== Characters ==
- Kom - the protagonist; a rebellious, cheeky, but brave and kind young Wonkoo monkey who helps uncover the treacherous plot. Voiced by Tara Römer, singing voice by Stéphane Peccoux (French); Matt Hill, singing voice by Paul Holmes (English), Daniel Brühl (German).
- Gina - Kom's love interest; a feisty, benevolent, clever, and jolly Lankoo monkey. Voiced by Nadia Farès (French); Sally Anne Marsh (English).
- Master Martin - the altruistic, wise, and loyal old scholar, who is a good friend and mentor to Kom and Gina. Voiced by Michael Lonsdale (French); Michael Gambon, singing voice by Robert Henry (English).
- Sebastian - The main antagonist of the film, he is the chancellor and is feared by many people, although he is trusted by them too. Only the workers building the castle are suspicious of him. Voiced by Jean Piat (French); John Hurt (English).
- Governess - The princess Ida's malicious governess, who helps Sebastian, is poisoning the princess and realises Gina is suspicious of her. Voiced by Janine Souchon (French); Shirley Anne Field (English).
- Gerard the Gormless - A villainous character, although he is just a sidekick, and does not appear to have many villainous qualities. He is one of the comic relief characters. Voiced by Patrick Préjean (French); Rik Mayall (English).
- The King - A kindly, but eccentric old man, who lets fantasy lead over fact. It is believed that he died by drowning in a lake. Voiced by Pierre Arditi (French); Michael York (English).
- Princess Ida - The King's sickly daughter who is being poisoned by the governess. By the end of the film, because of the help of Kom and Gina, she has recovered and becomes queen. She is also the one who realises they must give up the idea about the "better world" on the other side, and that the two tribes need to reunite. Voiced by Ivana Coppola (French); Diana Quick (English).
- Lionel - A Lankoo soldier, one of the few to trust Kom right from the start. Voiced by Bruno Choël (French); William Vanderpuye (English).
- Gavin - Kom's more sensible older brother. Voiced by Lionel Melet (French); Paul Dobson (English).
- Kom's mother - A kindly woman who loves both her sons. Voiced by Laurence Jeanneret (French); Janyse Jaud (English).
- Korcnak - The pompous, bossy and ignorant elder of the Wonkoos, who warns them about the Lankoos. His views are revealed to be very incorrect. Voiced by Yves Barsacq (French); French Tickner (English).
- Lankoo workers - They are surprised about Kom. They provide us with much of the gossip and information that is going on. They are also comic relief characters.
- Narrator - He tells the story right at the start.

== Sequel ==
A sequel titled The Prince's Voyage was produced in 2019. In this film, it is revealed that the King of the Lankoos survived falling into the lake and is rescued by a younger monkey named Tom.
