= Patrick Dewaere =

French film actor (1947–1982)

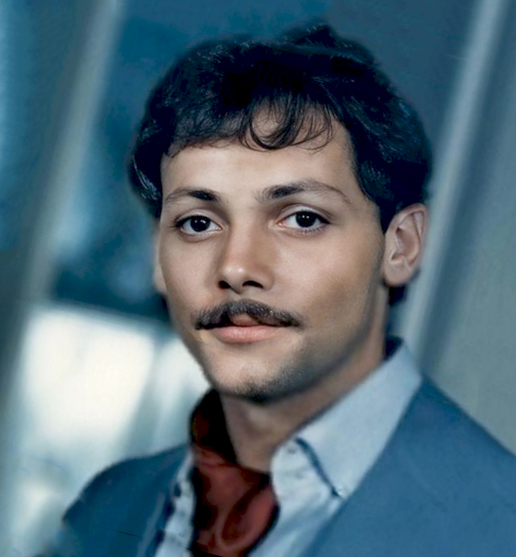
- Dewaere in 1975
- Born: Patrick Jean Marie Henri Bourdeaux; 26 January 1947; Saint-Brieuc, France
- Died: 16 July 1982 (aged 35); Paris, France
- Other names: Patrick Maurin; Patrick de Waëre
- Occupations: Actor; Singer-songwriter
- Years active: 1951–1982
- Height: 1.77 m (5 ft 10 in)
- Spouses: Sotha (m. 1968; div. 1979) Elizabeth Malvina Chalier (m. 1980)
- Partner: Miou-Miou
- Children: 2, including Lola Dewaere
- Relatives: Emmanuel Karsen (half-brother)

Signature
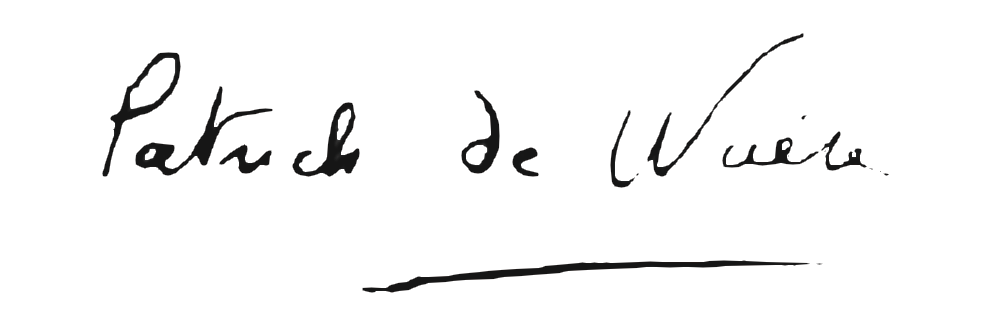

Patrick Dewaere (26 January 1947 – 16 July 1982) was a French film actor. Born in Saint-Brieuc, Côtes-d'Armor, he was the son of French actress Mado Maurin. An actor from a young age, his career lasted more than 21 years until his suicide in Paris, in 1982.

Dewaere was an icon in France and has been called "the most thrilling French actor of his generation", even though he "blazed across screens for just a few short years" before his suicide.

== Career ==
=== Early life ===
Patrick Dewaere was the third child of an actor's family. His biological father, Michel Têtard, was a lyricist who had an affair with Dewaere's mother, Mado Maurin, who was married to Pierre-Marie Bourdeaux. Dewaere grew up believing Bourdeaux was his biological father. After Dewaere's parents divorced, his mother remarried Georges Collignon, who sexually abused Dewaere as a child. Under the direction of his mother, Dewaere, his four brothers and his sister performed in movies and television series. The family lived in Paris. Dewaere attended the Cours Hattemer, a private school.

One of his first TV appearances was in 1961, when he was 14 years old. He appeared in a video for the song "Nuits d'Espagne" by Dalida.

=== Debuts as "Patrick Dewaere" ===
At the age of 17, Dewaere learned that he was not the biological child of his mother’s ex-husband, Pierre-Marie Bourdeaux, but that of conductor and singer Michel Têtard. In 1968, he took the name of "Dewaere", inspired by his maternal great-grandmother. A year earlier, he had met his first wife, Sotha, an actress who co-founded the Café de la Gare, an experimental theatre. They separated in 1970 but remained married for eleven years.

From 1968, he collaborated with the Café de la Gare, where he met Miou-Miou and Gérard Depardieu, with whom he made a breakthrough after many secondary roles in various films, in the scandalous comedy Going Places. Miou-Miou became Dewaere’s companion.

=== Success and depression ===
Patrick Dewaere became one of the most popular actors in French cinema in the 1970s. Between 1977 and 1982, he received five nominations for César Award for Best Actor, the most important award in France. In his work, Dewaere was restless and very conscientious, which may have caused his depressed mood. He also had serious drug problems, and it is known that he had been sexually abused as a child. He consolidated his status as a savage and ruthless actor in Alain Corneau’s cult film Série noire (1979). In his roles, Dewaere was for a long while attached to the image of young rebel. Only in his later films did his comic and dramatic diversity manifest itself. He often worked with director Bertrand Blier.

In 1980, Dewaere hit a journalist who had announced against his will his relationship with Elsa Chalier. Subsequently, the actor was ignored by the French press; his name was even abbreviated with his initials (P.D).

== Personal life ==
For eleven years Dewaere was married to French actress Sotha. In the early 1970s, he became the companion of French actress Miou-Miou; she left Dewaere for singer Julien Clerc, shortly before the shooting of F...like Fairbanks, in which both play a couple in separation. They had one daughter, Angèle (1974). He had another daughter, French actress Lola Dewaere with Elsa Chalier. Chalier left him in 1982 for his best friend Coluche.

Shortly afterwards, on 16 July 1982, facing financial and addiction problems, Dewaere shot himself in his house in Paris with a rifle Coluche had gifted him long ago. He was 35 years old. Paradis Pour Tous (1982), a black comedy where his character tries to commit suicide, was released later that year. At the time of his death, he was preparing for the film Édith et Marcel by Claude Lelouch, where he was to play the boxer Marcel Cerdan. He was buried in the cemetery of Saint-Lambert-du-Lattay, in the grave of his in-laws.

== Recognition ==
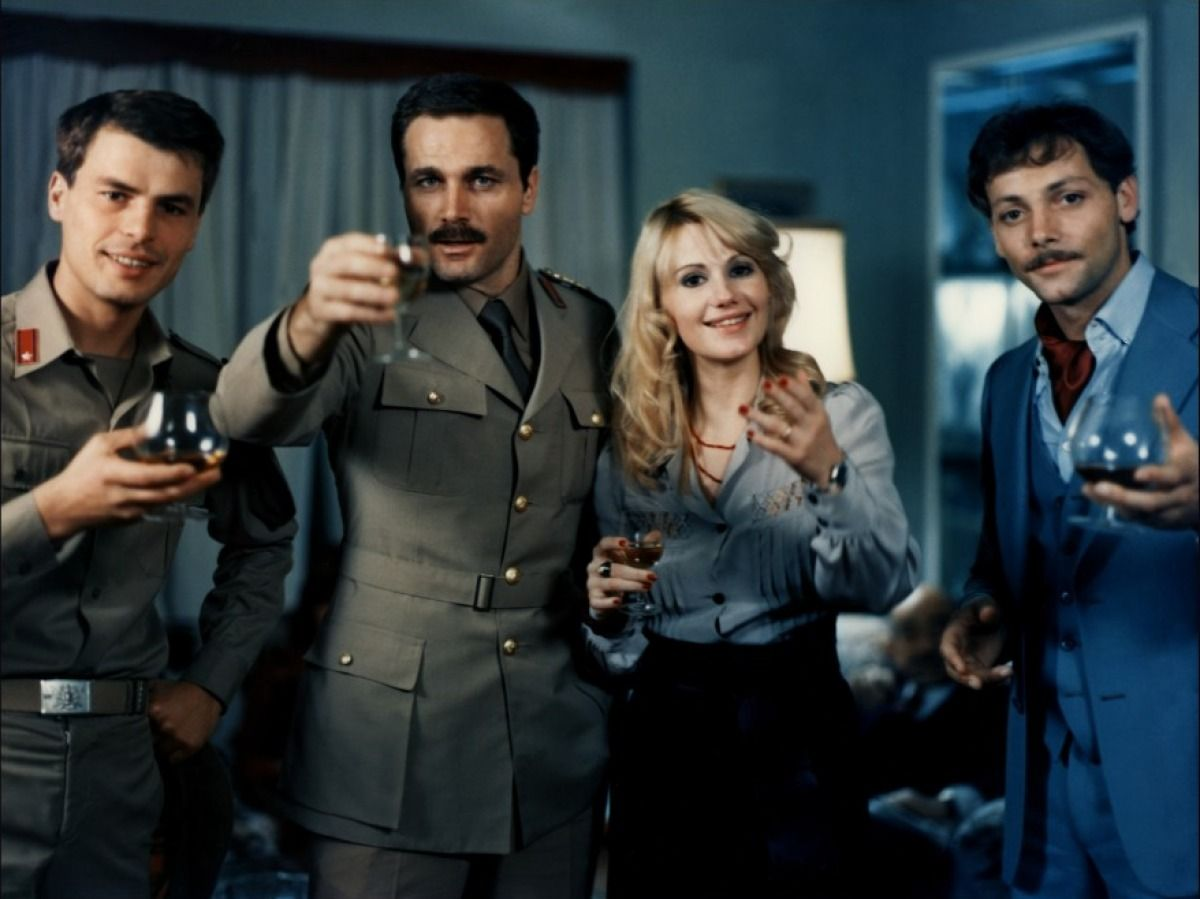
Italian actors Michele Placido, Franco Nero, with Patrick Dewaere (far right) and Miou-Miou, during the filming of the Italian film Marcia trionfale (1975).

In 1975, Dewaere received the Crystal Star of the Best Actor for The Best Way to Walk, shared with Patrick Bouchitey. This "half trophy" was the only award the profession gave him.

Between 1976 and 1982, the Académie des arts et techniques du cinéma français nominated the actor six times for the César, but never gave him the award:

- 1976: César nomination for Best Supporting Actor, Adieu Poulet.
- 1977: César nomination for Best Actor, The Best Way to Walk.
- 1978: César nomination for Best Actor, Le Juge Fayard dit Le Shériff.
- 1980: César nomination for Best Actor, Série noire (film).
- 1981: César nomination for Best Actor, Un mauvais fils.
- 1982: César nomination for Best Actor, Stepfather.

The 1978 Academy Award for Best Foreign Film was awarded to Bertrand Blier's Get Out Your Handkerchiefs, due in part to the performance of its stars, Dewaere and Depardieu.

== Legacy ==
=== In cinema ===
- The actor was the subject of the French documentary Patrick Dewaere, which was shown at the 1992 Cannes Film Festival.
- In Michel Gondry’s film La Science des rêves (2006), the hero played by Gael García Bernal metamorphoses into Patrick Dewaere during a scene and replays several major scenes from the film Série noire. The title of the original soundtrack accompanying this sequence is Rêve Patrick Dewaere.

Still of actor Patrick Dewaere.

=== In music ===
- 1982: Friend of Dewaere, Murray Head sings the song Shades of the Prison House in the album Shade, which will be taken as soundtrack of the film Patrick Dewaere, directed by Marc Esposito in 1992.
- 1983: Louis Chedid evokes the memory of the actor in his song Les absents sont toujours tort.
- 1983: Catherine Lara also paid tribute to him, with the title T'es pas drôle.
- 1994: Christian Décamps on the album Nu with the song Impasse du Moulin Vert.
- 1996: In the song Nirvana of the album Premières Consultations, Doc Gynéco writes: «J'vais me foutre en l'air comme Patrick Dewaere» ("I'm gonna kill myself like Patrick Dewaere").
- 2002: Renaud evokes Dewaere in his song Mon bistrot préféré on the album Boucan d'enfer.
- 2005: Raphael pays tribute to him with his Chanson pour Patrick Dewaere on the album Caravane.
- The Schneider-Dewaere Double Prize rewards the male and female hopes of French cinema.

=== Others ===
- In 1995, a care unit for suicidal young adults took his name at Lierneux (Belgium).
- In 2008, the Patrick-Dewaere Prize, intended to reward the promising actors of French cinema, was created to replace the Jean-Gabin Prize that had existed since 1980.
- On 22 December 2009, the Théâtre de Verdure esplanade located in the Parc des promenades of Saint-Brieuc, his hometown, was named Patrick-Dewaere esplanade, in the presence of Mado Maurin, Jean-François Vlérick, Luc Béraud and Gilles Durieux.

== Filmography ==
Year	Title	Role	Director	Notes
1955	Monsieur Fabre		Henri Diamant-Berger	
1955	La Madelon	Un enfant du village	Jean Boyer	Uncredited
1956	Plucking the Daisy	Toto's brother	Marc Allégret	Uncredited
1956	I'll Get Back to Kandara	the little boy	Victor Vicas	credited as Patrick Maurin
1957	The Happy Road	Child	Gene Kelly	
1957	Les Espions	Le petit Moynet	Henri-Georges Clouzot	
1958	Mimi Pinson	Le jeune frère de Mimi	Robert Darène	
1966	Paris brûle-t-il?	young resistance fighter who gets executed	René Clément	Uncredited
1971	Les Mariés de l'an II	a volunteer	Jean-Paul Rappeneau	the film was entered into the 1971 Cannes Film Festival
1971	The Deadly Trap	L'homme à l'écharpe jaune	René Clément	Uncredited
1973	Themroc	Le maçon, and uncredited role as policeman	Claude Faraldo	the film received a prize at the 1973 International Film Festival of Avoriaz
1974	Les Valseuses	Pierrot	Bertrand Blier	the 3rd highest-grossing film of the year 1974 in France
1975	Au long de rivière Fango	Sébastien	Sotha	
1975	Lily aime-moi	Gaston	Maurice Dugowson	nominated for best film at the 25th Berlin International Film Festival
1975	Pas de problème!	Le barman	Georges Lautner	
1975	Catherine et Compagnie	François	Michel Boisrond	English title: "Catherine & Co."
1975	Adieu poulet	Lefevre	Pierre Granier-Deferre	the film was nominated for two Césars (editing and best supporting actor)
1976	La Meilleure façon de marcher	Marc	Claude Miller	winner of the César Award for Best Cinematography in 1975
1976	Marcia trionfale	Lt. Baio	Marco Bellocchio	English title: "Victory March"
1976	F... comme Fairbanks	André	Maurice Dugowson	also credited as co-composer of the music
1977	Le Juge Fayard dit Le Shériff	Jean-Marie Fayard	Yves Boisset	
1977	La stanza del vescovo	Marco Maffei	Dino Risi	adapted from the novel of the same name by Piero Chiara
1978	Préparez vos mouchoirs	Stéphane	Bertrand Blier	Academy Award for Best Foreign Language Film at the 51st Academy Awards
1978	La Clé sur la porte	Philippe	Yves Boisset	based on the novel of the same name
1979	Traffic Jam	the young man	Luigi Comencini	entered into the 1979 Cannes Film Festival
1979	Coup de tête	François Perrin	Jean-Jacques Annaud	César Award for Best Actor in a Supporting Role for Jean Bouise
1979	Série noire	Franck Poupart	Alain Corneau	entered into the 1979 Cannes Film Festival
1979	Paco l'infaillible	Pocapena	Didier Haudepin	
1980	Un mauvais fils	Bruno Calgagni	Claude Sautet	César Award for Best Supporting Actor for Jacques Dufilho
1981	Psy	Marc	Philippe de Broca	film score by Mort Shuman
1981	Plein sud	Serge Laine	Luc Béraud	released as "Heart Of Desire" in the USA
1981	Beau-Père	Rémi Bachelier	Bertrand Blier	entered into the 1981 Cannes Film Festival
1981	Les matous sont romantiques	Le voisin	Sotha	
1981	Hotel America	Gilles Tisserand	André Téchiné	playing Catherine Deneuve's lover
1982	Mille milliards de dollars	Paul Kerjean	Henri Verneuil	International title: A Thousand Billion Dollars
1982	Paradis pour tous	Alain Durieux	Alain Jessua	Dewaere's final film role
