= R.I.F. =

- Film poster
- Directed by: Franck Mancuso
- Starring: Yvan Attal; Pascal Elbé
- Release date: 31 August 2011
- Running time: 90 minutes
- Country: France
- Language: French

R.I.F. is a 2011 French crime film directed by Franck Mancuso.

== Cast ==
- Yvan Attal as Stéphane Monnereau
- Pascal Elbé as Capitaine Bertrand Barthélémy
- Valentina Cervi as Valérie Monnereau
- Armelle Deutsch as Chef Marion Marquand
- Éric Ruf as Jean-Dominique Perrin
- Pascal Elso as Christian Baumann
- Carlo Brandt as Richard Jorelle
- Agnès Blanchot as Charlène Riback
- Anne Charrier as Sandra Giuliani
- Mado Maurin as La mère de Jorelle
- Aladin Reibel as Menghetti
- Bruno Magne as Albert Koskas
