= Emmanuel Karsen =

French actor (1963–2025)

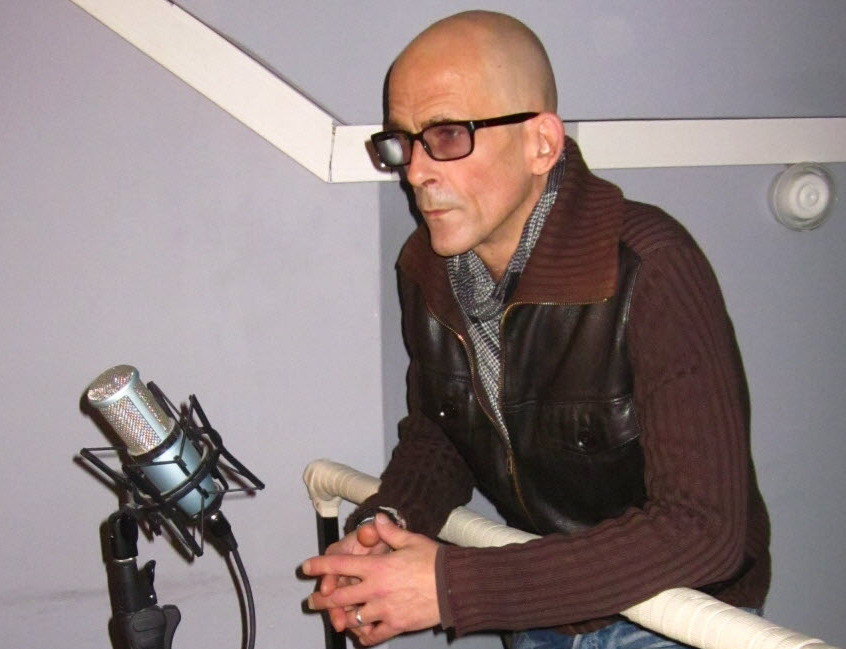
- Karsen in 2012
- Born: Emmanuel Bourdeaux; 23 March 1963; France
- Died: 11 September 2025 (aged 62)
- Occupation: Actor
- Relatives: Patrick Dewaere (half-brother); Dominique Collignon-Maurin (uncle); Mado Maurin (grandmother); Lola Dewaere (niece)

Emmanuel Bourdeaux (23 March 1963 – 11 September 2025) was a French actor. He was best known for providing the dubbed voice of Ryuk in the French version of the Japanese anime television series Death Note.

In addition to his work in Death Note, he provided the dubbed French voices for Sean Penn in Milk, John Leguizamo in Kick-Ass 2, Louis Mandylor in My Big Fat Greek Wedding, Norman Reedus in Air, Christian Bale in Newsies, Brad Pitt in 12 Monkeys, Lew Temple in The Texas Chainsaw Massacre: The Beginning, Willem Dafoe in Death Note's film version, Johnny Depp in What's Eating Gilbert Grape, Jack Black in Bob Roberts, Jeremy Davies in The Million Dollar Hotel and Ed Skrein in Deadpool, and was a member of the band Les Heroics.

Karsen died on 11 September 2025, at the age of 62.
