= La Clé sur la porte =

- Author: Marie Cardinal
- Language: French
- Publication date: 1972

La Clé sur la porte (meaning "The Key is in the door") is a novel written by Marie Cardinal and published in 1972. It is the story of a woman trying to reexamine her own values and free herself from social restraints after suffering a lifetime of oppression. The novel describes her self-therapy; a kind of experiment, allowing her children the freedom she never had in her own strict upbringing, and her ‘interviews’ with their friends.

== Plot summary ==
The novel is narrated by a forty-year-old woman living in a Paris apartment with her three children and a group of their friends. The apartment functions as a communal household where residents and visitors share a living space. Through personal reflection, the novel explores several themes, including freedom and authority, loneliness, and community, as well as individualism.

== Adaptation ==
A movie with the same title was adapted in 1977 by Writer/Director André Weinfeld from the novel. It starred Annie Girardot and Patrick Dewaere and was directed by Yves Boisset.
