= Le Cœur des hommes =

Le coeur des hommes
- Directed by: Marc Esposito
- Written by: Marc Esposito
- Produced by: Pierre Javaux
- Starring: Bernard Campan; Gérard Darmon; Jean-Pierre Darroussin; Marc Lavoine
- Cinematography: Pascal Caubère
- Edited by: Benoît Alavoine; Christian Dior
- Music by: Béatrice Thiriet
- Production companies: BAC Films; Canal+ Cofimage 13; France 2 Cinéma; PJP Films
- Distributed by: BAC Films
- Release date: 2 April 2003
- Running time: 100 minutes
- Country: France
- Language: French
- Budget: $5 million
- Box office: $11.9 million

Le Cœur des hommes (English: The Heart of Men) is a 2003 French comedy drama film written and directed by Marc Esposito. The film was followed by two sequels: Le coeur des hommes 2, released in 2007, and Le coeur des hommes 3 in 2013.

The opening and the closing credits of the film feature the song "I'll Stand By You" by The Pretenders.

== Main cast ==
- Bernard Campan – Antoine
- Gérard Darmon – Jeff
- Jean-Pierre Darroussin – Manu
- Marc Lavoine – Alex
- Ludmila Mikaël – Françoise
- Zoé Félix – Elsa
- Florence Thomassin – Juliette
- Alice Taglioni – Annette

== Plot ==
Alex, Antoine, Jeff and Manu have been friends for most of their lives and have achieved their professional goals, therefore all seems to be going well. Suddenly, the death of a father, a wife's infidelity and a daughter's wedding affects them and brings them closer together. Forced to confront situations beyond their control, they share their feelings, support each other, and question the true meaning of their lives. They realise that their relationship with women is at the heart of all their problems, their conversations and their conflicts.
