= Those Were the Days (1995 French film) =

1995 film

- Film poster
- Directed by: Didier Haudepin
- Written by: Didier Haudepin; Claire Mercier
- Starring: Élodie Bouchez; Melvil Poupaud; Sophie Aubry; Gaël Morel; Myriam Boyer
- Cinematography: Jean-Marc Fabre
- Edited by: Juliette Welfling
- Music by: Alexandre Desplat
- Production companies: Bloody Mary Productions; La Sept Cinéma
- Release date: 13 September 1995 (France)
- Running time: 85 minutes
- Country: France
- Language: French
- Budget: $2.3 million
- Box office: $870,000

Those Were the Days (French: Le plus bel âge...) is a 1995 French drama film directed by Didier Haudepin. It was screened in the Un Certain Regard section at the 1995 Cannes Film Festival.

== Cast ==
- Élodie Bouchez - Delphine
- Melvil Poupaud - Axel
- Sophie Aubry - Claude
- Gaël Morel - Bertrand
- Myriam Boyer - Bertrand's mother
- Marcel Bozonnet - a khâgne teacher
- Benjamin Mercier - Pierre
- Bégonia Zuazaga - Bégonia
- Nicolas Koretzky - André
- Estelle Larrivaz - Estelle
- Sylvie Testud - Sylvie
- Tara Römer - Michel
- Richard Djoudi - Olivier
- Laurent Morel - Charles
- Nils Ohlund - Niels
