= Lily, aime-moi =

1975 film

- Theatrical release poster
- Directed by: Maurice Dugowson
- Written by: Maurice Dugowson; Michel Vianey
- Produced by: Michel Seydoux
- Starring: Patrick Dewaere
- Cinematography: André Diot
- Edited by: Cécile Decugis
- Music by: Edgardo Canton
- Release date: 22 April 1975
- Running time: 100 minutes
- Country: France
- Language: French

Lily, aime-moi is a 1975 French comedy film directed by Maurice Dugowson. It was entered into the 25th Berlin International Film Festival.

== Cast ==
- Jean-Michel Folon – François
- Patrick Dewaere – Gaston, dit Johnny Cash
- Rufus – Claude
- Zouzou – Lily
- Juliette Gréco – Flo
- Jean-Pierre Bisson – Le frère de Flo / Flo's brother
- Roger Blin – Le père de Lily / Lily's father
- Jean Capel
- Roland Dubillard – L'intellectuel de chez Flo / Intellectual at Flo's
- Pauline Godefroy – Une invitée chez Flo
- Anne Jousset – L'auto-stoppeuse / Hitchhiker
- Tatiana Moukhine – La mère de Lily / Lily's mother
- Maurice Vallier – Le rédacteur chez François / François' coworker
- Andréas Voutsinas – Le barbu de chez Flo / Bearded man at Flo's
- Henry Jaglom – Un invité chez Flo / A guest at Flo's
- Bernard Freyd
- Miou-Miou – La fille dans le café / The girl in the coffee-shop
