= Café de la Gare =

Theatre in Paris, France

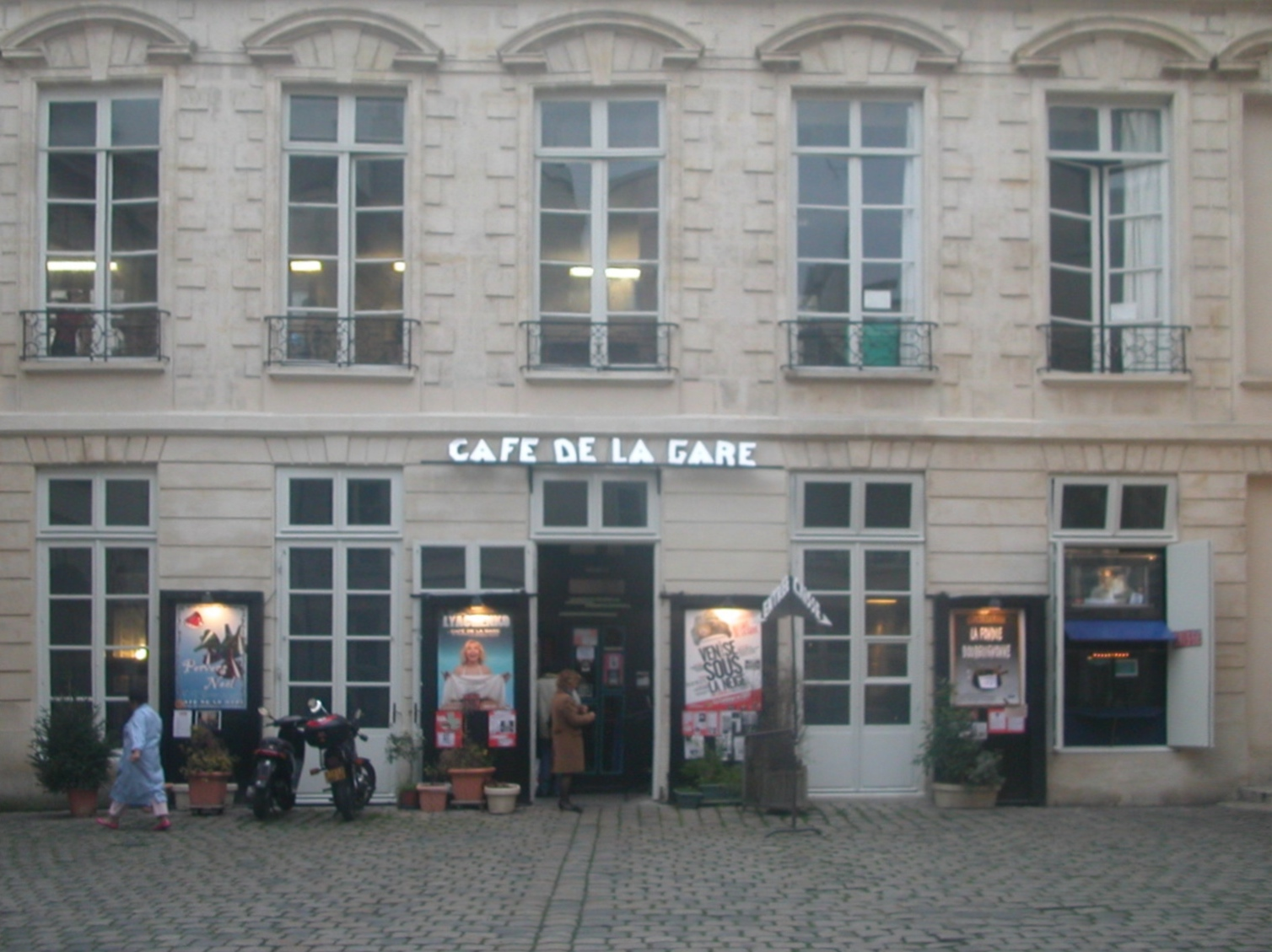
- Interactive map of Café de la Gare
- Address: 41, rue du Temple, 4th Paris; France
- Coordinates: 48.8573719°N 2.3524656°E
- Capacity: 450
- Type: café-théâtre

Construction
- Opened: 1968

Website
- www.cdlg.org/w/

The Café de la Gare (French pronunciation: [kafe də la ɡaʁ]) is a dinner theater located at 41, rue du Temple in the 4th arrondissement of Paris, at the western end of the historic Marais district. It was originally created in 1968 by a close-knit group of comedy actors who fixed up an old factory near the Gare de Paris-Montparnasse in the 14th arrondissement. It was not until 1972 that the Cafe moved to its present location where it has become the largest and most famous fringe theater in Paris with a house that seats 450.

== History ==
When it was founded, the Cafe de la Gare was called a "dinner theater", a vague term which at the time, applied mainly to a tax category. However, it was never a coffee house, and there were never any tables or chairs, only benches for about 180 people, surrounding the three sides of a stage eight meters wide and five meters deep.

From the beginning the theatre was dedicated to mockery and farce. When the patrons arrived they had to draw lots determine the price of their seats. Once seated they were entitled to a drink and a cushion which the actors frequently threw in their face. Even the slogan of the theatre was brash: "It's ugly, it's dirty, it's going to happen" (C'est moche, c'est sale, c'est dans le vent.)

A remarkable number of the founding members of the Café de la Gare went on to become famous. These include Romain Bouteille, Sotha, Coluche, Patrick Dewaere, Henri Guybet, and Miou-Miou. At one time or another the company included Gérard Lanvin, Gérard Depardieu, Renaud, Thierry Lhermitte, Diane Kurys, Coline Serreau, Josiane Balasko, Anémone, and Gérard Jugnot. The cafe was also notable for having many famous entertainers as patrons; among the regulars over the years were Georges Moustaki, Raymond Devos, Jean Ferrat, Jacques Brel, Pierre Perret, and Jean Yanne.
