= Paul Selver =

English writer and translator

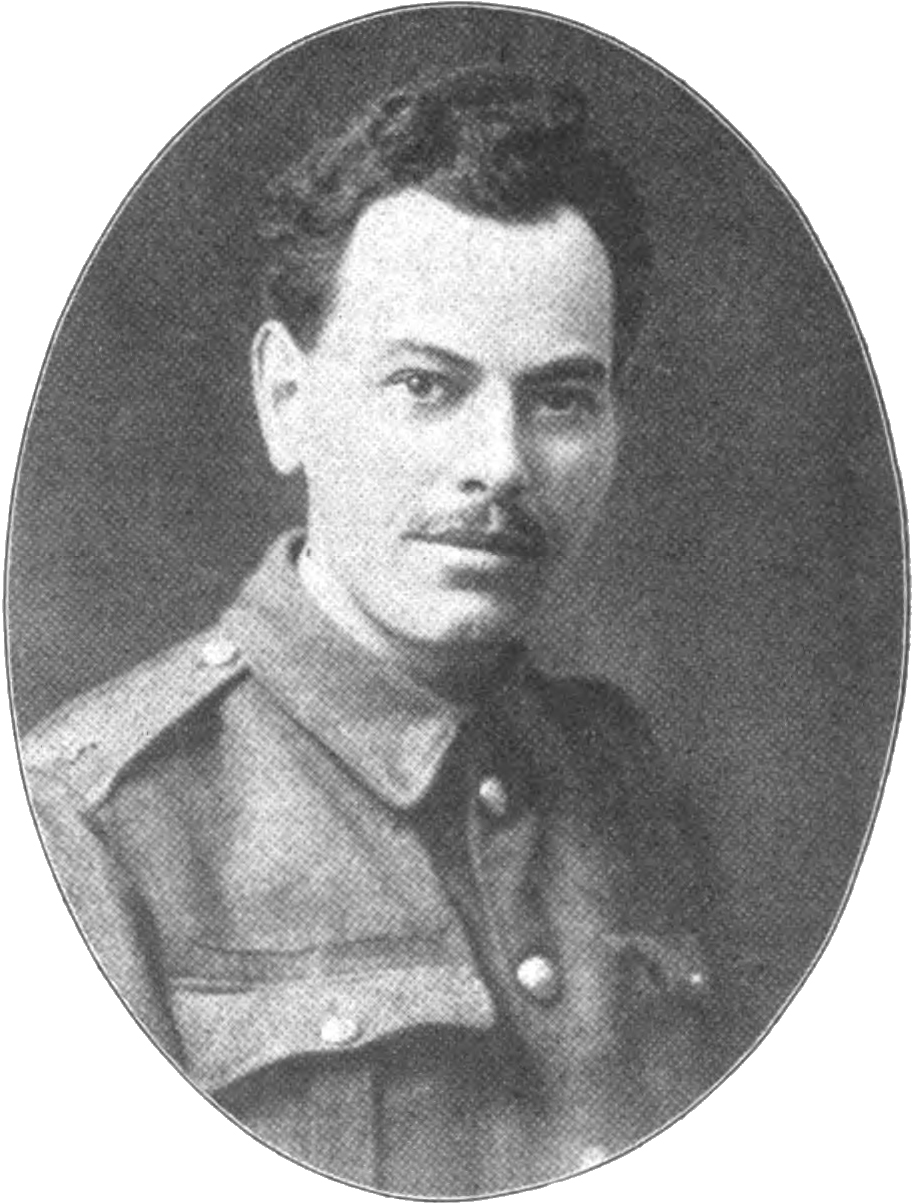
- Born: 22 March 1888
- Died: 6 April 1970 (aged 82)
- Citizenship: The United Kingdom
- Occupations: novelist, poet, translator

(Percy) Paul Selver (22 March 1888 – 6 April 1970) was an English writer and translator. A prolific translator of Czech literature into English, he was best known as the translator of Karel Čapek.

== Life ==
Paul Selver was born to a Jewish family, the son of Wolfe and Catherine (Minden) Selver. He gained a B.A. in English and German from the University of London. After serving in the army during World War I he became a translator, novelist, and contributor to Alfred Richard Orage's magazine The New Age.

Selver spoke and translated from several Germanic and Slavonic languages. In World War II he was a linguistic assistant to the exiled Czech government, but was dismissed when the Communists took over. In 1968 he was awarded a Civil List pension for his services to literature. He died on 6 April 1970, his wife having died six months earlier.

== Works ==
=== Translations ===
- (ed.) An anthology of modern Bohemian poetry. London: Henry J. Drane, 1912
- (ed. with intro.) Modern Russian poetry: texts and translations, London & New York: Kegan Paul, Trench, Trubner, & co., 1917.
- 'The Woman' and 'The Invincible Ship' in People of the Universe: four Serbo-Croatian plays by Josip Kosor. London: Hendersons, 1917.
- (ed. with intro.) Anthology of modern Slavonic literature in prose and verse, London: Kegan Paul & Co., 1919.
- (ed. with intro.) Modern Czech poetry: selected texts with translations and an introduction. London & New York: K. Paul, Trench, Trubner & Co. Ltd., 1920.
- (with Jaroslav Císař and František Pokorný) The Czechoslovak Republic : its economical, industrial and cultural resources, Prague: L'effort de la Tchécoslovaquie, 1920.
- Poems by Sigbjørn Obstfelder. Translated from the Norwegian. Oxford, 1920. (Norwegian and English on facing pages.)
- Poems by Jens Peter Jacobsen. Oxford, 1920.
- The jail experiences in 1916 by Josef Svatopluk Machar. Oxford: B. Blackwell, 1921.
- And so ad infinitum (The life of the insects) : an entomological review, in three acts, a prologue and an epilogue by Karel Čapek and Josef Čapek. Freely adapted for the English stage by Nigel Playfair and Clifford Bax. London: Humphrey Milford, 1923.
- R.U.R. Rossum's Universal Robots: a play in three acts and an epilogue by Karel Čapek. Adapted for the London stage by Nigel Playfair. London: Oxford University Press, 1923.
- Letters from England by Karel Čapek. London: Geoffrey Bles, 1925.
- The land of many names: a play in three acts and a transformation by Josef Čapek. London: G. Allen & Unwin ltd., 1926.
- The Macropulos secret: a comedy by Karel Čapek
- My war memoirs by Edvard Beneš. London: Allen and Unwin, 1928.
- Music of the heart: selected poems by Emanuel Lešehrad. Prague: K. Zink, 1929.
- (ed.) An anthology of Czechoslovak literature, London, : K. Paul, Trench, Trubner & co., ltd., 1929.
- The good soldier Schweik by Jaroslav Hašek. London: Heinemann, 1930.
- Letters from Spain by Karel Čapek. London: Geoffrey Bles, 1931.
- Tales from two pockets by Karl Čapek. London: Faber & Faber ltd., 1932.
- Thirty Years in the Golden North by Jan Welzl. Edited by Edward Valenta and B. Golombek. London: G. Allen & Unwin, 1932.
- Letters from Holland by Karel Čapek. London : Faber and Faber, 1933.
- The wizard of Menlo by Edmund Konrad. London: K.S. Bhat, 1935.
- The wounded dragon by Francis de Croisset. London : Geoffrey Bles, 1937.
- (tr. with Ralph Neale) Power and glory: a drama in three acts by Karel Čapek. London : G. Allen & Unwin, ltd., 1938.
- Blackmail or war by Geneviève Tabouis. Harmondsworth: Penguin Books, 1938.
- The mother: a play in three acts, London: Allen & Unwin, 1939.
- And this: our life by Jacqueline Vincent. Translated from the French L'enfant qui passe. London, 1939.
- Central stores by Vicki Baum. Translated from the German 'Der grosse ausverkauf. London: Bles, 1940.
- Hollar : a Czech émigré in England by Johannes Urzidil. London: The "Czechoslovak", 1942.
- "Panslavism" past and present by Vladimir Clementis. London : Czechoslovak Committee from Slav Reciprocity, 1943.
- A Complicated Affair; or, Alias Weiskopf by František Kubka. London : Ćechoslovák, 1944.
- Mademoiselle de Maupin by Théophile Gautier. Translated from the French. London: Hamish Hamilton, 1948.
- Gabrielle by Christine Brueckner. London: Robert Hale, 1956.
- Khrushchev of the Ukraine : a biography by Victor Alexandrov. London: Gollancz, 1957.
- The House of Crystal by Hans Kades. London: Angus & Robertson, 1957.
- The Pursuer by Günther Weisenborn. London: Heinemann, 1962.

=== Novels ===
- Schooling, London: Jarrolds, 1924.
- One, Two, Three, London : Jarrolds, 1926.
- Private Life, London : Jarrolds Publishers Ltd, 1929.

=== Poetry ===
- Personalities, London: George Allen & Unwin, 1918
- A baker's dozen of tin trumpets, and two others of different metal, London, S. Nott, 1935.

=== Autobiography ===
- (as Mark Grossek) First movement. London, 1937.

=== Other ===
- (ed. with intro., notes and vocab.) The chameleon and four other tales by Anton Chekhov. London: Kegan Paul & Co., 1916.
- 'London mourning', Today, No. 30, Vol. 5 (August 1919)
- Otakar Březina : a study in Czech literature, Oxford : B. Blackwell, 1921.
- Czech self-taught by the natural method with phonetic pronunciation: Thimm's system. London: E. Marlborough & Co, ltd., 1927.
- Masaryk: a biography, London: M. Joseph, 1940
- Czechoslovak literature, an outline, London : G. Allen & Unwin, 1942
- Slovníček Anglického Slangu. Glossary of English slang with Czech equivalents. London: G. Allen & Unwin Ltd., 1942
- A century of Czech and Slovak poetry, London: New Europe Publishing Co.; Prague Press, 1946.
- English phraseology. A dictionary containing more than 5,000 idiomatic and colloquial words and expressions, London, J. Brodie, 1957.
- Orage and the New Age circle: reminiscences and reflections, London: Allen & Unwin, 1959
- France under Napoleon III', London: James Brodie, 1961.
- 'Preface' to Song out of darkness: selected poems by Vera Rich. London : Mitre Press, 1961.
- More English phraseology : a supplementary volume to the popular 'English phraseology', Bath: James Brodie, 1965
- The Art of Translating Poetry, London: John Baker Publishers Ltd., 1966
