= Miou-Miou =

French actress (born 1950)

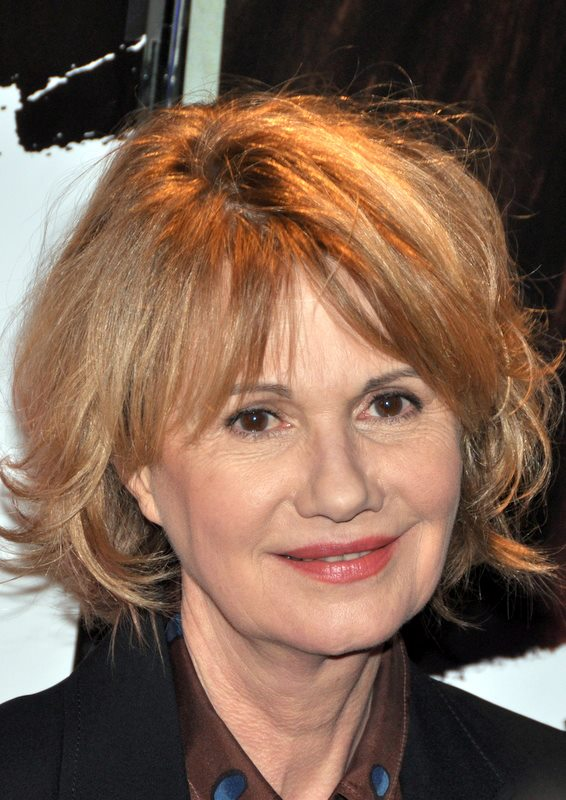
- Miou-Miou in 2013
- Born: Sylvette Herry; 22 February 1950 (age 76); Paris, France
- Occupation: Actress
- Years active: 1971–present
- Children: 2, including Jeanne Herry

Sylvette Herry (born 22 February 1950), known professionally as Miou-Miou (French: [mjumju]), is a French actress. A ten-time César Award nominee, she won the César Award for Best Actress for the 1979 film Memoirs of a French Whore. Her other films include This Sweet Sickness (1977), Entre Nous (1983), May Fools (1990), Germinal (1993), Dry Cleaning (1997) and Arrêtez-moi (2013). In her career she has worked with a number of international directors, including Michel Gondry, Bertrand Blier, Claude Berri, Jacques Deray, Patrice Leconte, Joseph Losey and Louis Malle.

== Early life ==
Miou-Miou was born Sylvette Herry in Paris. Her stage name, Miou-Miou (a reference to the sound of a cat), was given to her by Coluche. She was raised in Paris by her mother, a greengrocer.

== Career ==
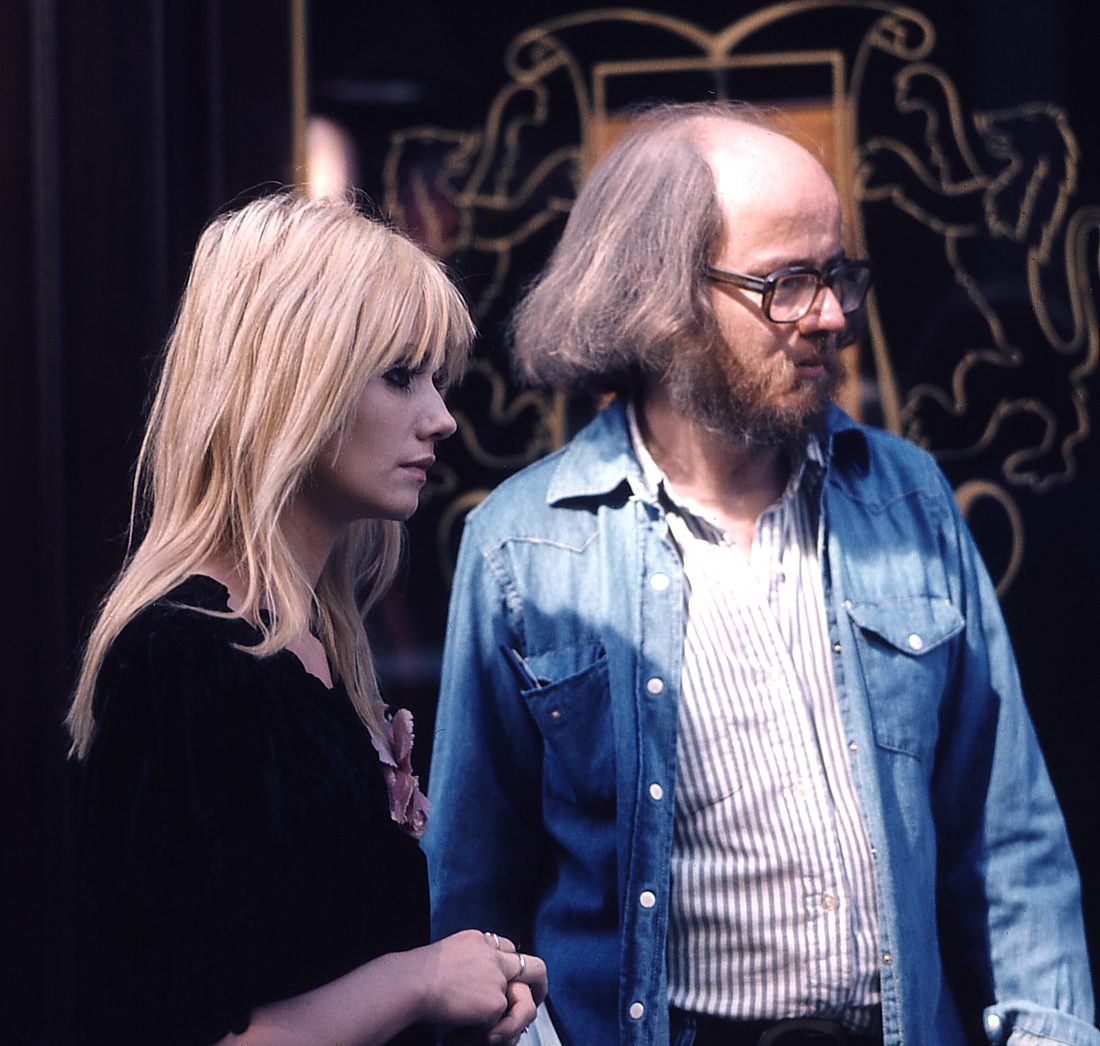
Miou-Miou with director Jean-Pierre Blanc in 1973

After studying acting Miou-Miou worked in improvisational theater with Coluche and Patrick Dewaere, joining with them to help found the new comedy theatre Café de la Gare. She made her film debut in La vie sentimentale de Georges Le Tueur and La Cavale (both 1971).

In 1973 she appeared in three films, Elle court, elle court la banlieue, Les Granges brûlées and Les Aventures de Rabbi Jacob. Her big break came with Blier's Going Places, released in 1974. During the 1970s, she had roles in such films as F comme Fairbanks (1976), Alain Tanner's Jonah Who Will Be 25 in the Year 2000 (1976), and Losey's Roads to the South (1978). In Memoirs of a French Whore (1979), directed by Daniel Duval, she portrayed a young prostitute and received a César Award for the role. Many of these 1970s films were released internationally to art-house venues. In 1976 she appeared in one of the last spaghetti Westerns, Damiano Damiani's A Genius, Two Friends, and an Idiot.

Through the 1980s she was in such films as La gueule du loup (1981), Guy de Maupassant (1982), Diane Kurys's Entre nous (1983) with Isabelle Huppert, Blanche et Marie (1984), Evening Dress (1986), and Deville's The Reader (1988). She played opposite Lee Marvin (in one of his last roles) in Boisset's Dog Day in 1984.

The 1990s saw her in Louis Malle's May Fools (1990), Deray's thriller Netchaïev is back, the comedy Un indien dans la ville (1994), and The Eighth Day (1996) and Dry Cleaning in 1997. She appeared opposite Gérard Depardieu in a new production of Émile Zola's Germinal (1993). 2001 saw her in Agathe et le grand magasin and in 2004 she appeared in L'après-midi de monsieur Andesmas, among other films.

By the mid-2000s, her film roles abated and she began to appear in theatre.

== Personal life ==
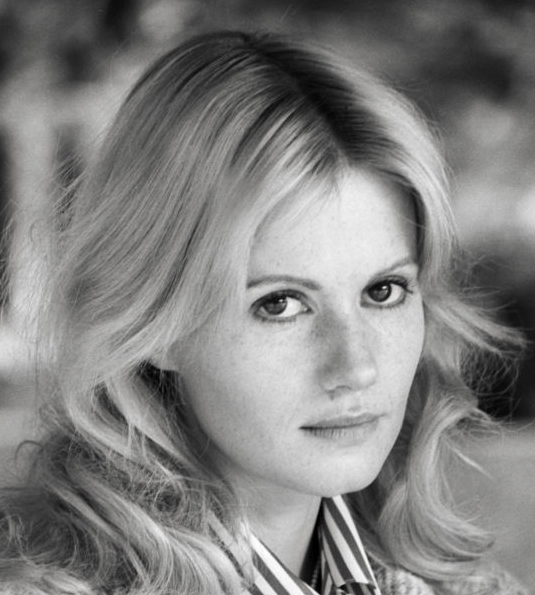
Miou-Miou in 1976

Miou-Miou has two daughters, Angèle Herry-Leclerc (born 1974), whose father is actor Patrick Dewaere, and Jeanne Herry (born 1978), whose father is singer Julien Clerc.

== Filmography ==
| Year | Title | Role | Notes |
|---|---|---|---|
| 1971 | La cavale | Little Squirrel | |
| 1971 | La vie sentimentale de Georges Le Tueur | | Short |
| 1972 | Ça va, ça vient | Magic Circus's woman | |
| 1973 | Quelques messieurs trop tranquilles | Anita Boucher | |
| 1973 | Themroc | The young neighbor | |
| 1973 | Elle court, elle court la banlieue | The assistant | |
| 1973 | The Year 01 | The woman at 6 am | |
| 1973 | The Burned Barns | Monique Cateux | |
| 1973 | The Mad Adventures of Rabbi Jacob | Antoinette Pivert | |
| 1974 | Going Places | Marie-Ange | |
| 1974 | Tender Dracula | Marie | |
| 1975 | Lily, aime-moi | The girl in the coffee shop | |
| 1975 | Pas de problème! | Anita Boucher | |
| 1975 | A Genius, Two Partners and a Dupe | Lucy | |
| 1976 | Al piacere di rivederla | Patrizia | |
| 1976 | Victory March | Rosanna | |
| 1976 | D'amour et d'eau fraîche | Rita Gonzalez | |
| 1976 | F comme Fairbanks | Marie | Nominated – César Award for Best Actress |
| 1976 | On aura tout vu | Christine | |
| 1976 | Jonah Who Will Be 25 in the Year 2000 | Marie | |
| 1977 | This Sweet Sickness | Juliette | Nominated – César Award for Best Actress |
| 1978 | Les routes du sud | Julia | |
| 1979 | Traffic Jam | Angela | |
| 1979 | Bye, See You Monday | Nicole | |
| 1979 | Memoirs of a French Whore | Marie | César Award for Best Actress |
| 1980 | The Woman Cop | Inspector Corinne Levasseur | |
| 1981 | Est-ce bien raisonnable? | Julie Boucher | |
| 1981 | La gueule du loup | Marie | |
| 1982 | Josepha | Josépha Manet | Nominated – César Award for Best Actress |
| 1982 | Guy de Maupassant | Gisèle d'Estoc | |
| 1983 | Entre Nous | Madeleine | Nominated – César Award for Best Actress |
| 1983 | My Other Husband | Alice | |
| 1984 | Dog Day | Jessica | |
| 1984 | Le vol du Sphinx | Laura | |
| 1985 | Blanche et Marie | Blanche | |
| 1985 | Une vie comme je veux | Laurence | TV movie |
| 1986 | Tenue de soirée | Monique | Nominated – César Award for Best Actress |
| 1988 | The Revolving Doors | Lauda | Nominated – Genie Award for Best Supporting Actress |
| 1988 | The Reader | Constance / Marie | Nominated – César Award for Best Actress |
| 1988 | L'argent | Caroline Hamelin | TV movie |
| 1988 | Un vrai bonheur | | Short |
| 1990 | May Fools | Camille | Nominated – César Award for Best Actress; Nominated – David di Donatello for Best Foreign Actress |
| 1991 | Netchaïev est de retour | Brigitte | |
| 1991 | La Totale! | Hélène Voisin | |
| 1992 | Scènes de ménage | The woman | Short |
| 1992 | Le bal des casse-pieds | Louise Sherry | |
| 1993 | Tango | Marie | |
| 1993 | Germinal | Maheude | Nominated – César Award for Best Actress |
| 1994 | Montparnasse-Pondichéry | Julie | |
| 1994 | Un indien dans la ville | Patricia | |
| 1995 | Une femme dans la tourmente | Michèle Rouannet | TV movie |
| 1995 | Une page d'amour | Hélène | TV movie |
| 1995 | Court toujours: Joséphine et les gitans | Joséphine | TV short |
| 1996 | Ma femme me quitte | Joanna Martin | |
| 1996 | The Eighth Day | Julie | |
| 1997 | Dry Cleaning | Nicole Kunstler | Lumière Award for Best Actress; Nominated – César Award for Best Actress |
| 1997 | Elles | Eva | |
| 1998 | Hors jeu | Herself | |
| 2000 | Tout va bien, on s'en va | Laure | |
| 2000 | Pour une fois | | Short |
| 2001 | Agathe et le grand magasin | Agathe | TV movie |
| 2003 | Ambre a disparu | Eva Lorca | TV movie |
| 2004 | Folle embellie | Alida | |
| 2004 | Mariages! | Gabrielle | |
| 2004 | L'après-midi de monsieur Andesmas | Michel Arc's wife | |
| 2005 | L'un reste, l'autre part | Anne-Marie | |
| 2005 | Riviera | Antoinette | |
| 2006 | The Science of Sleep | Christine Miroux | |
| 2006 | Avril | Sister Bernadette | |
| 2006 | Le héros de la famille | Simone Garcia | |
| 2007 | Les murs porteurs | Judith Rosenfeld | |
| 2008 | Affaire de famille | Laure Guignebont | |
| 2008 | The Great Alibi | Éliane Pages | |
| 2008 | Mia and the Migoo | Juliette's voice | |
| 2009 | Marcher | Herself | Short |
| 2009 | Petites vacances à Knokke-le-Zoute | Micheline | TV movie |
| 2009 | Pour un fils | Catherine | |
| 2009 | Le Concert | Guylène de La Rivière | |
| 2009 | Une petite zone de turbulences | Anne Muret | |
| 2011 | Le grand restaurant II | A client | TV movie |
| 2011 | Le choix d'Adèle | Adèle | TV movie |
| 2012 | Quand je serai petit | Jacqueline | |
| 2012 | Bienvenue parmi nous | Alice | |
| 2012 | Avanti | Catherine | |
| 2012 | Populaire | Madeleine Échard | |
| 2013 | Arrêtez-moi | Pontoise | |
| 2013 | Bob et les Sex Pistaches | | |
| 2013 | Landes | Madeleine | |
| 2018 | In Safe Hands | Irène | |
| 2021 | The Last Mercenary | Marguerite | |
