= Didier Haudepin =

French actor, film producer, screenwriter and director

- Born: 15 August 1951 (age 74); Paris, France
- Occupations: Actor; Film producer; Film director; Screenwriter
- Years active: 1960–present
- Family: Sabine Haudepin (sister)

Didier Haudepin (born 15 August 1951) is a French actor, film producer, director and screenwriter. He has appeared in 44 films and television shows, and plays since 1960. His film Those Were the Days was screened in the Un Certain Regard section at the 1995 Cannes Film Festival. He is most well known for his lead role in Les amitiés particulières, the film adaptation of the eponymous novel by Roger Peyrefitte, as Alexandre Motier.

== Selected filmography ==
=== Actor ===
- Seven Days... Seven Nights (1960) as Pierre
- Les amitiés particulières (1964) as Alexandre Motier
- The Uninhibited (1965) as Daniel Regnier
- Cotolay (1966) as Cotolay
- Top Crack (1967) as Uno
- Promise at Dawn (1970) as Romain Kacew.
- Les Assassins de l'ordre (1971) as François Level
- A Time for Loving (1971) as son of the concierge.
- L'innocente (1976) as Federico Hermil.
- No Trifling with Love (1977) as Perdican.

=== Director ===
- Those Were the Days (1995 – directed)

== Bibliography ==
- Holmstrom, John. The Moving Picture Boy: An International Encyclopaedia from 1895 to 1995. Norwich, Michael Russell, 1996, p. 293.
