= Patrick Dewaere (film) =

1992 film

- Directed by: Marc Esposito
- Written by: Marc Esposito
- Produced by: Marie Meunier, Philippe Godot
- Starring: Angèle; Serge Rousseau; Sotha
- Cinematography: Eric Weber
- Edited by: Claudine Merlin
- Music by: Patrick Dewaere; Murray Head
- Distributed by: Pan-Européenne Distribution
- Release date: 20 May 1992
- Running time: 85 minutes
- Country: France
- Languages: French, English

Patrick Dewaere is a 1992 French documentary film directed by Marc Esposito, about the actor of the same name. It was screened out of competition at the 1992 Cannes Film Festival.
