= Les amitiés particulières =

Novel by Roger Peyrefitte

- Les amitiés particulières book cover (1973)
- Author: Roger Peyrefitte
- Translator: Felix Giovanelli (1950); Edward Hyams (1958)
- Publication date: 1943
- Award: Prix Renaudot

Les amitiés particulières is a 1943 novel by French writer Roger Peyrefitte, probably his best-known work today, which won the Prix Renaudot. Largely autobiographical, it deals with an intimate relationship between two boys at a Roman Catholic boarding school and how it is destroyed by a priest's will to protect them from homosexuality.

The book has been translated into English by Felix Giovanelli (1950) and Edward Hyams (1958), both times under the title Special Friendships, the latter reissued in the United States as Secret Friendships. As of 2011, they are out of print. In 1964, a film adaptation titled Les amitiés particulières was made, directed by Jean Delannoy.

== Synopsis ==
The plot revolves around Georges de Sarre, a 14-year-old boy who is sent to a Catholic boarding school in 1920s France. Getting to know the other boys, he is immediately interested in Lucien Rouvière, of whom he is warned by the unsympathetic Marc de Blajan, who cryptically informs him that some of the students "may seem good, but are in fact not". Georges is dismayed when he learns that Lucien already has a boyfriend, André Ferron. He befriends Lucien, but filled with envy, tries to destroy their relationship, eventually succeeding in getting André expelled in a Machiavellian scheme.

When his advances toward Lucien remain fruitless, Georges starts a "special friendship", i.e. a friendship with homosexual overtones, with a 12-year-old student, the beautiful Alexandre (Alexander) Motier. The priests who lead the school disapprove of these relationships, even though it does not go beyond a few kisses and love poems, with no sexual connotation.

Despite their air of condemnation of these special friendships, some of the priests harbour sexual feelings for the boys. One of them, Father de Trennes, likes to invite boys to join him in his room at night for a few drinks and cigarettes. Georges continues his scheming ways and gets Father de Trennes expelled by an anonymous letter. However, Father Lauzon, who is a friend of Alexandre's family and wants to protect him, learns about their relationship and demands that it be ended immediately.

Lauzon talks Georges into giving back the love letters from Alexandre, which at the time the novel is set meant that a relationship was over. In the film version, this is straightforward: Georges is forced to return the letters, but Alexandre cannot see this, thinks that Georges had abandoned him, and commits suicide. The account in the novel is more complicated: Georges is aware that he could deceive the priest by handing over only a few of the letters and that Alexandre would then know that he was not ending their affair, but nevertheless he decides to return them all in order to subject the boy to a "test" and a "passing crisis", and thereby lead him to abandon his wild plans of running away from home in order for the two of them to decamp together (p. 397 of the 1946 edition). What is clear is that Georges is not single-minded in his attachment to their affair in the way that Alexandre is. The shock of the boy's death, however, works a change of heart, and the novel ends with his attaining the same devotion to love that Alexandre had shown.

The work has been praised for its elegant style, and the discretion with which the subject is treated. One example is the question which Alexander poses to Georges: "Georges, do you know the things one should not know?"

== Relationship to Peyrefitte's biography and other similar works ==
The plot is understood to be largely autobiographical, with de Sarre being Peyrefitte's alter ego in the book. As in the book, Peyrefitte had a relationship with a younger student at a Catholic boarding school, and as in the book, his love interest eventually committed suicide.

The reader can follow George de Sarre's later life as a diplomat in Greece in Peyrefitte's Les Ambassades and La Fin des ambassades, where he also meets Father de Trennes again. Again, this parallels Peyrefitte's life as a diplomat in the 1930s/1940s.

Peyrefitte was on (mostly) friendly terms with Henry de Montherlant, who in his later years wrote a novel (Les Garçons, 1969) about a similar relationship. There exists substantial correspondence between the two on, among other things, love for boys and young men.

== Bibliography ==
- Les amitiés particulières: roman / Roger Peyrefitte. Marseille: Jean Vigneau, 1943 (Toulouse: Impr. régionale). 382 pp.; 24 × 19 cm. [Limited edition, 1.999 numbered ex.: 1.858 numbered with Arabic numerals for public sale. 141 numbered with Roman numerals designated hors d 'commerce or H.C.]
- Les amitiés particulières: roman / Roger Peyrefitte. [85e édition]. Paris: Jean Vigneau, 1946 (Mayenne: impr. de Floch). 444 pp.; 18 × 12 cm.
- Les amitiés particulières: roman / Roger Peyrefitte; avec, en frontispices, 2 lithographies originales de Valentine Hugo.... – [Paris]: J. Vigneau, 1946 (impr. de J. Dumoulin). 2 vols., pl.; 28 × 19 cm. [Limited edition, 990 numbered ex.]
- Le amicizie particolari / Roger Peyrefitte; trad. G. Natoli. Torino: Einaudi, 1949. 388 p.
- Special friendships / Roger Peyrefitte; transl. from the French by Felix Giovanelli. New York: Vanguard Press, 1950. 392 pp.
  - Briefly noted in The New Yorker 25/50 (4 February 1950): 93
- Heimliche Freundschaften: Roman / Roger Peyrefitte. [Übers. von Günther Vulpius]. Karlsruhe: Stahlberg, 1950. 476 pp.
- Les amitiés particulières: roman / Roger Peyrefitte. Paris: Flammarion, 1951 (Lagny: impr. de Emmanuel Grevin et fils). 444 pp.; 19 × 12 cm. [New edition in 1964]
- Les amitiés particulières: roman / Roger Peyrefitte; lithographies de [Gaston] Goor. [Paris] : Flammarion, 1953 (J. Dumoulin; Marcel Manequin, 10 mai 1953). 2 vols, [4] 180 pp. 12 pl., [4] 180 pp. 12 pl.: 24 lithographies; 29 × 20 cm. [Limited edition, 740 ex.]
- Les amitiés particulières / Roger Peyrefitte; [dessins de Englebert]. Paris: Club des éditeurs, 1956 (Paris: Club des éditeurs, 20 juin 1956). 352 pp.: ill., portrait, cart. ill.; 20 × 14 cm (rel.). (Club des éditeurs; 6). [Limited edition, 7.176 ex.]
- Special friendships : a novel / by Roger Peyrefitte; transl. from the French by Edward Hyams. London: Secker & Warburg, 1958 (Bristol: Western Printing Services Ltd). 352 pp.; 20 × 14 cm (hb).
- Les amitiés particulières / Roger Peyrefitte; [illustration de G. Benvenuti]. Paris: Éditions J'ai lu, 1958 (impr. d'E. Pigelet). 448 pp.: couv. en coul. avec notice et portrait; 16 cm. (J'ai lu; 17-18). [New editions in 1964, 1968, 1973, 1999 (ISBN 2-27711017-5)]
- Special friendships: a novel / by Roger Peyrefitte; transl. from the French by Edward Hyams. Panther, 1964 (December 1964). 256 pp.; (pb). ISBN 0-586-01663-5
- Verholen vriendschap / Roger Peyrefitte. Utrecht: Bruna, 1966. 372 p.
- Les amitiés particulières / Roger Peyrefitte; [frontispice de Daniel Briffaud]. [Levallois-Perret]: Cercle du bibliophile, [1968]. 399 pp.: portrait, cart. ill.; 20 cm. (Le Club des grands prix littéraires).
- Különleges barátságok / Roger Peyrefitte; [transl. László Szenczei]. Budapest: Magvető Könyvkiadó, 1969. 446 pp.
- Les amitiés particulières: roman: édition définitive / Roger Peyrefitte. Paris: Librairie Générale Française, 1973 (73-La Flèche: impr. Brodard et Taupin). 448 pp.: couv. ill. en coul.; 17 cm. (Le Livre de poche; 3726). [New editions in 1975 (ISBN 2-253-00446-4), 1978 (ISBN 2-253-00446-4)]
- Les amitiés particulières / Roger Peyrefitte. Genève: Édito-service; [Évreux]: [diffusion le Cercle du bibliophile], [1973] (impr. en Suisse). 397 pp.: portr.; 21 cm (rel.). (Le Club des grands prix littéraires).
- Les amitiés particulières / Roger Peyrefitte. Neuilly-sur-Seine: Éd de Saint-Clair; [Paris]: diffusion F. Beauval, 1975 (impr. en Suisse). 352 pp. [6] f. de pl.: ill.; 18 × 12 cm (rel.). (Collection des grands romans contemporains).
- Les amitiés particulières: roman / Roger Peyrefitte. [Montrouge]: [le Livre de Paris], 1975 (80-Doullens: impr. Sévin). 442 pp.; 19 cm (rel.). (Club pour vous Hachette). ISBN 2-245-00320-9
- Le amicizie particolari / Roger Peyrefitte; trad. G. Natoli. Torino: Einaudi, 1979. 346 pp. (Nuovi Coralli). ISBN 88-06-49197-0
- Heimliche Freundschaften: Roman / Roger Peyrefitte. Hamburg: Knaus, 1983. 349 pp. ISBN 3-8135-3195-3
- Les amitiés particulières / Roger Peyrefitte. Paris: Flammarion, 1986. 442 pp.
- Les amitiés particulières / Roger Peyrefitte. Paris: Flammarion, 1992 (8 janvier 1992). ISBN 2-08-060173-3
- Les amitiés particulières / Roger Peyrefitte. Paris: Flammarion, 1992. 128 pp. ISBN 2-08-064968-X
- Las amistades particulares / Roger Peyrefitte. [Barcelona]: Ed. Egales [=Editorial Gai y Lesbiana]; Otras Voces, 2000. 398 pp.; 22 × 14 cm. ISBN 84-95346-09-5
- Secret friendships / by Roger Peyrefitte; drawings by Hugo Haig-Thomas. Clarence (New York): West-Art Publishers, 2000. 264 pp.: ill. ISBN 0-914301-23-3
- Heimliche Freundschaften: [Roman] / Roger Peyrefitte; aus dem Franz. von Günther Vulpius. Berlin: Bruno Gmünder Verlag, 2004. 318 pp.; 18 cm. (Bruno-Gmünder-Taschenbuch; 37). ISBN 3-86187-837-2
- Les amitiés particulières / Roger Peyrefitte. Paris: Flammarion, 2004 (août 2004). ISBN 2-08-060172-5
- Les amitiés particulières: roman / Roger Peyrefitte. Paris: Éd. TG [= Éd. Textes gais] (Paris: Impr. Trèfle communication, 2005). 390 pp.: ill., couv. et jaquette ill. en coul.; 21 cm (br.). ISBN 2-914679-16-5
