= Maurice Dugowson =

French film director

- Born: 23 September 1938; Saint-Quentin, Aisne, France
- Died: 11 November 1999 (aged 61); Paris, France
- Occupations: Film director, screenwriter
- Years active: 1975–1997

Maurice Dugowson (23 September 1938 – 11 November 1999) was a French film director and screenwriter. His 1975 film Lily, aime-moi was entered into the 25th Berlin International Film Festival. The following year, his film F comme Fairbanks was entered into the 26th Berlin International Film Festival. In 1981 his film Bye, See You Monday was entered into the 12th Moscow International Film Festival.

== Selected filmography ==
- Lily, aime-moi (1975)
- F comme Fairbanks (1976)
- Bye, See You Monday (1979)
- Sarah (1983)
- Blind Spot (1995)
- El Che (1997)
