= Nicolas Koretzky =

French actor

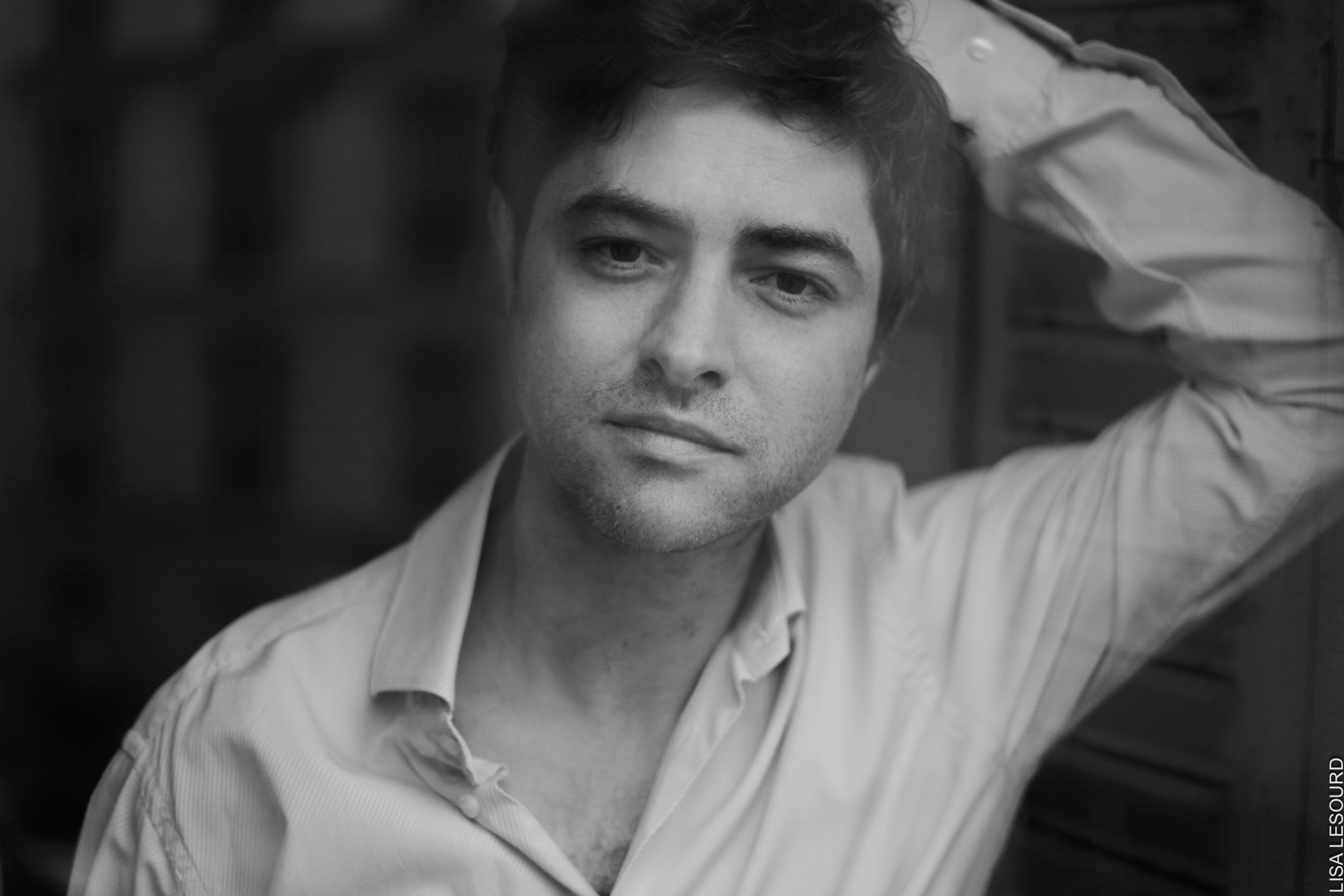
Nicolas Koretzky

Nicolas Koretzky is a French actor, who played as 'Morlot' in the French TV series Résistance.

Koretzky has appeared in films, television and plays in France.

== Selected filmography ==
- Le Péril jeune (1994)
- Those Were the Days (1995)
