= Marc Esposito =

French film director

- Born: 16 July 1952 (age 74); French Algeria
- Occupations: Film director, screenwriter
- Years active: 1976–

Marc Esposito (born 16 July 1952) is a French film director and screenwriter. Esposito was first a journalist, film critic and press manager. He created two movie magazines: Premiere with Jean-Pierre Frimbois in 1976, and Studio magazine in 1987. His film Patrick Dewaere was screened out of competition at the 1992 Cannes Film Festival. He directed the film Le Coeur des Hommes in 2003 and its two sequels. Since Mon Pote in 2010, Esposito is also a producer, with its company: Wayan Productions.

== Filmography ==
- Patrick Dewaere (1992)
- Le Cœur des hommes (2003)
- Toute la beauté du monde (2006)
- Le coeur des hommes 2 (2007)
- Mon pote (2010)
- Le coeur des hommes 3 (2013)

== Co-screenwriting ==
- L'envol de Steve Suissa (2000)

== Writing ==
- Toute la beaute du monde Novel (1999)
- Au Coeur des Hommes Essay (2007)
- Mémoires d’un enfant du cinéma - Les années Première Memories (2019)

== Theater ==
- Rendez-vous en boite (2014) Play, created at La Gaite Montparnasse theater
