= List of crime films of 1995 =

This is a list of crime films released in 1995.

Title	Director	Cast	Country	Notes
Bad Company	Damian Harris	Ellen Barkin, Laurence Fishburne, Frank Langella, Gia Carides, David Ogden Stiers, Michael Beach	United States	Crime thriller
The Bait (L'Appât)	Bertrand Tavernier	Marie Gillain, Olivier Sitruk, Bruno Putzulu	France	Crime drama
A Boy Called Hate	Mitch Marcus	Scott Caan, Missy Crider, Elliott Gould, Adam Beach, James Caan	United States	Crime drama
Casino	Martin Scorsese	Robert De Niro, Sharon Stone, Joe Pesci	United States	
La Cérémonie	Claude Chabrol	Isabelle Huppert, Sandrine Bonnaire, Jacqueline Bisset	France; Germany	
Clockers	Spike Lee	Harvey Keitel, John Turturro, Delroy Lindo, Mekhi Phifer	United States	Crime drama
Cyclo	Tran Anh Hung	Le Van Loc, Tony Leung Chiu-Wai, Tran Nu Yên-Khê	France; Vietnam	Crime drama
Dead Presidents	Albert Hughes, Allen Hughes	Larenz Tate, Keith David, Chris Tucker, Freddy Rodriguez, N'Bushe Wright, Bokeem Woodbine	United States	Crime drama
The Doom Generation	Gregg Araki	James Duval, Rose McGowan, Johnathon Schaech	United States; France	
Fallen Angels	Wong Kar-wai	Leon Lai, Michelle Reis, Takeshi Kaneshiro	Hong Kong	Gangster film
Get Shorty	Barry Sonnenfeld	John Travolta, Gene Hackman, Rene Russo, Danny DeVito, Dennis Farina, James Gandolfini, Delroy Lindo	United States	Crime comedy
Gonin	Takashi Ishii	Kazuya Kimura, Beat Takeshi Kitano, Masahiro Motoki	Japan	
Hackers	Iain Softley	Jonny Lee Miller, Angelina Jolie, Fisher Stevens, Lorraine Bracco, Jesse Bradford, Matthew Lillard, Wendell Pierce	United States	Crime thriller
Heat	Michael Mann	Al Pacino, Robert De Niro, Val Kilmer, Jon Voight, Tom Sizemore, Diane Venora, Amy Brenneman, Ashley Judd, Wes Studi, Mykelti Williamson, Natalie Portman	United States	Crime thriller
The Immortals	Brian Grant	Eric Roberts, Tia Carrere, Tony Curtis	United States	
The Last Supper	Stacy Title	Cameron Diaz, Ron Eldard, Annabeth Gish, Jonathan Penner, Courtney B. Vance	United States	
Mushrooms	Alan Madden	Julia Blake, Brandon Burke, Simon Chilvers	Australia	Crime comedy
Palookaville	Alan Taylor	William Forsythe, Vincent Gallo, Adam Trese	United States	Crime comedy
Seven	David Fincher	Brad Pitt, Morgan Freeman, Gwyneth Paltrow, Kevin Spacey	United States	Crime thriller
Shanghai Triad	Zhang Yimou	Gong Li, Li Baotian, Li Xuejian	China; France	
Things to Do in Denver When You're Dead	Gary Fleder	Andy García, Christopher Lloyd, William Forsythe, Bill Nunn, Treat Williams, Jack Warden, Steve Buscemi, Fairuza Balk, Gabrielle Anwar, Christopher Walken	United States	
The Underneath	Steven Soderbergh	Peter Gallagher, Alison Elliott, William Fichtner	United States	
The Usual Suspects	Bryan Singer	Gabriel Byrne, Stephen Baldwin, Kevin Spacey, Benicio Del Toro, Kevin Pollak, Chazz Palminteri, Suzy Amis, Pete Postlethwaite, Giancarlo Esposito	United States	
The Young Poisoner's Handbook	Benjamin Ross	Hugh O'Conor, Antony Sher, Ruth Sheen	Germany; United Kingdom	
