= Charles Berling =

French actor, director, and screenwriter

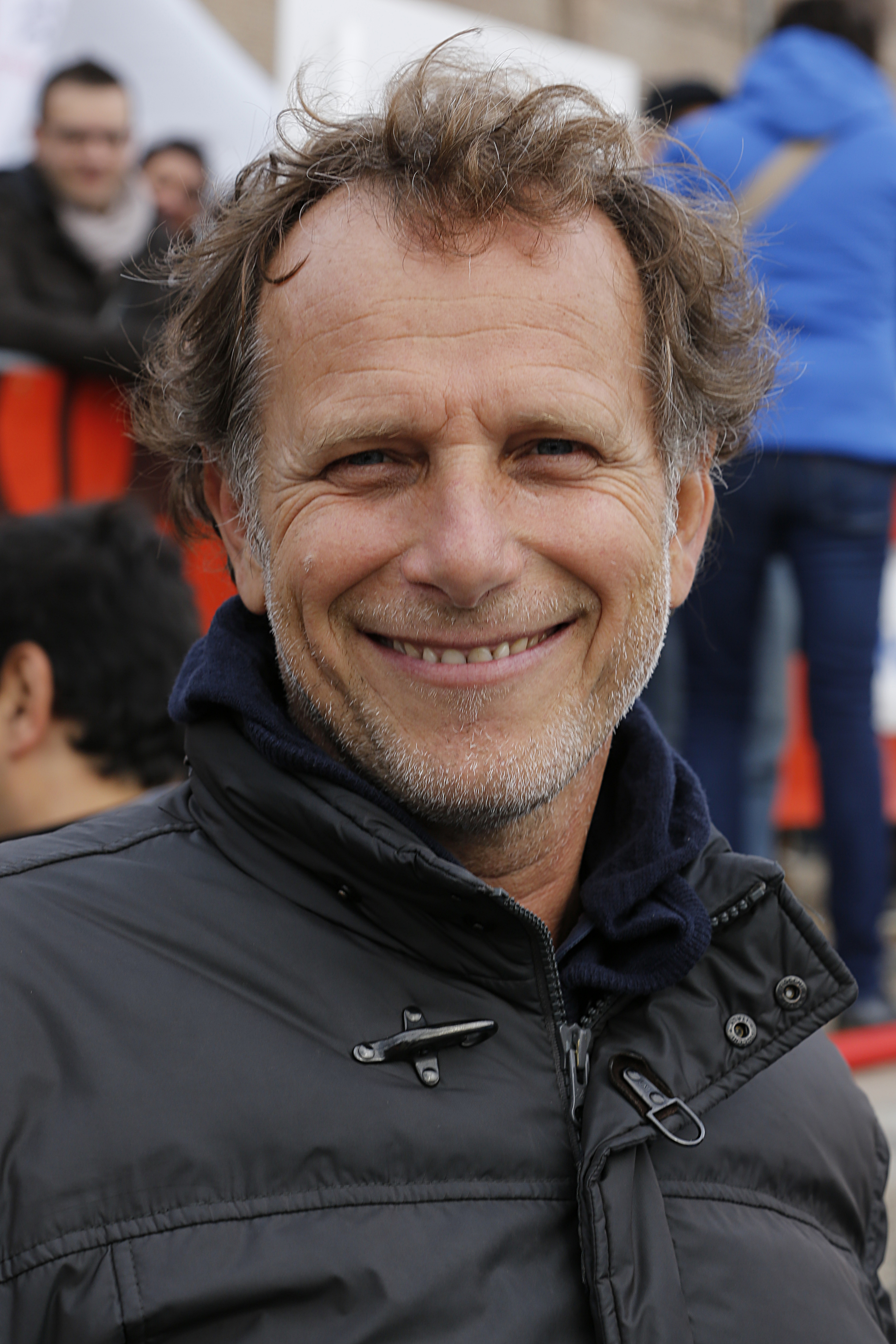
- Charles Berling in 2013
- Born: 30 April 1958 (age 68); Saint-Mandé, France
- Occupations: Actor, film director, screenwriter
- Years active: 1981–present

Charles Berling (born 30 April 1958) is a French actor, director and screenwriter.

== Life and career ==
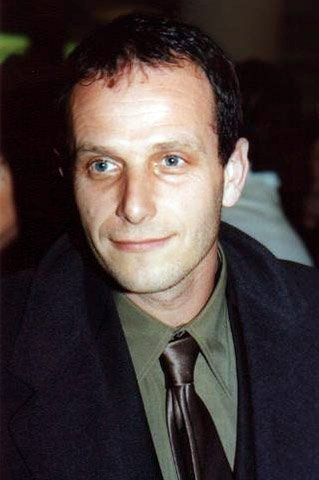
Berling at the 1998 César Awards ceremony.

Charles Berling, son of a navy doctor, is also the nephew of the literary critic Raymond Picard. His mother, Nadia, "only daughter of (French) settlers in Morocco" was born in Meknes (Morocco); she died in 2004.

When he was two years old he left Paris for Brest, then Toulon, then, at seven, Tahiti.. At the age of fifteen, he discovered theatre through a drama workshop created by his older brother at Lycée Dumont-d'Urville in Toulon.

He later studied acting at the Belgian school INSAS, in Brussels. before beginning a career in theatre and film. He is the father of the actor Émile Berling.

In October 2025, he joined the cast of Nicole Garcia's upcoming film Milo.

== Filmography ==
Key
†	Denotes films that have not yet been released

Year	Title	Role	Director	Notes
1982	Meurtres à domicile	Inspector Focard	Marc Lobet	
1988	Le crépuscule des loups	The SS soldier	Jean Chapot	TV movie
1988	Les nouveaux chevaliers du ciel	Jacquier	Patrick Jamain	TV series (1 episode)
1989	Laura und Luis		Frank Strecker	TV Mini-Series
1989	Condorcet		Michel Soutter	TV Mini-Series
1990	Sniper	Macet	Klaus Biedermann	TV movie
1990	Monstre aimé		Frédéric Compain	TV movie Also Writer
1992	Salt on Our Skin	Roger	Andrew Birkin	
1992	La femme à l'ombre	The lawyer	Thierry Chabert	TV movie
1993	Just Friends	André	Marc-Henri Wajnberg	
1993	Louis, the Child King		Roger Planchon	
1993	Couples et amants	Jean	John Lvoff	
1994	Coming to Terms with the Dead	François	Pascale Ferran	Nominated - César Award for Most Promising Actor
1994	Dernier stade	Frédéric Noilla	Christian Zerbib	
1994	Consentement mutuel	Laurent	Bernard Stora	
1994	Un dimanche à Paris	Romaric	Hervé Duhamel	
1995	Nelly and Mr. Arnaud	Jerôme	Claude Sautet	
1995	Pullman paradis	Lucien Génin	Michèle Rosier	
1995	Le fabuleux destin de Madame Petlet		Camille de Casabianca	
1995	L'âge des possibles	Man at phone	Pascale Ferran	TV movie
1995	La grande collection	Jules	Jeanne Labrune	TV series (1 episode)
1996	Ridicule	Grégoire Ponceludon de Malavoy	Patrice Leconte	Lumière Award for Best Actor; Nominated - César Award for Best Actor
1996	Love, etc.	Pierre	Marion Vernoux	
1997	Dry Cleaning	Jean-Marie Kunstler	Anne Fontaine	Nominated - César Award for Best Actor
1997	Les Palmes de M. Schutz	Pierre Curie	Claude Pinoteau	
1997	Obsession	Pierre Moulin	Peter Sehr	
1998	L'Ennui	Martin	Cédric Kahn	Nominated - César Award for Best Actor
1998	Those Who Love Me Can Take the Train	Jean-Marie	Patrice Chéreau	Étoiles d'Or - Best Actor
1998	L'inconnu de Strasbourg	Jean-Paul	Valeria Sarmiento	
1998	La cloche		Charles Berling	Short; Also Director & Writer
1998	Un dimanche matin à Marseille	Renaud	Mario Fanfani	Short
1998	Une femme à suivre	Eddy	Patrick Dewolf	TV movie
1999	The Bridge	Matthias	Frédéric Auburtin & Gérard Depardieu	
1999	Fait d'hiver	Louis Riquier	Robert Enrico	
2000	Sentimental Destinies	Jean Barnery	Olivier Assayas	Nominated - César Award for Best Actor
2000	A Question of Taste	René Rousset	Bernard Rapp	
2000	Stardom	Philippe Gascon	Denys Arcand	
2000	Crime Scenes	Fabian	Frédéric Schoendoerffer	
2000	Comedy of Innocence	Serge	Raúl Ruiz	
2001	Savage Souls	Reveillard	Raúl Ruiz	
2001	How I Killed My Father	Jean-Luc	Anne Fontaine	
2001	15 August	Vincent	Patrick Alessandrin	
2001	Un jeu d'enfants	Jacques Fauvel	Laurent Tuel	
2001	Fils de zup	Inspector Boyer	Gilles Romera	
2002	Demonlover	Hervé Le Millinec	Olivier Assayas	
2002	Cravate club	Bernard	Frédéric Jardin	
2002	Hypnotized and Hysterical	Arnaud	Claude Duty	
2002	Jean Moulin	Jean Moulin	Yves Boisset	TV movie
2003	Père et fils	David	Michel Boujenah	
2003	I'm Staying!	Antoine	Diane Kurys	
2003	The Assassinated Sun	Jean Sénac	Abdelkrim Bahloul	
2004	Secret Agents	Eugène	Frédéric Schoendoerffer	
2005	I Saw Ben Barka Get Killed	Georges Figon	Serge Le Péron & Saïd Smihi	
2005	The Art of Breaking Up	Edouard de Bois d'Enghien	Michel Deville	
2005	Grabuge !	Maurice	Jean-Pierre Mocky	
2005	La maison de Nina	Maurice Gutman	Richard Dembo	
2005	Dalida	Lucien Morisse	Joyce Buñuel	TV movie
2005	Permis d'aimer	Jean	Rachida Krim	TV movie
2005	Inséparables	Antoine	Élisabeth Rappeneau	TV series (3 episodes)
2006	The Man of My Life	Hugo	Zabou Breitman	
2006	Je pense à vous	Worms	Pascal Bonitzer	
2006	Marie-Antoinette	The voice	Francis Leclerc & Yves Simoneau	TV movie
2007	Les murs porteurs	Simon Rosenfeld	Cyril Gelblat	
2007	Notable donc coupable	Fabien Borda	Dominique Baron & Francis Girod	TV movie
2008	Summer Hours	Frédéric Marly	Olivier Assayas (3)	
2008	Quiet Chaos	Boesson	Antonello Grimaldi	
2008	Par suite d'un arrêt de travail...	Vincent Disse	Frédéric Andréi	
2008	L'abolition	Robert Badinter	Jean-Daniel Verhaeghe	TV Mini-Series
2008	Myster Mocky présente	Brad	Jean-Pierre Mocky	TV series (1 episode)
2009	Before Sundown	The soldier	Toby Morris	Short
2010	Insoupçonnable	Henri Schaeffer	Gabriel Le Bomin	
2010	Krach	Georges	Fabrice Genestal	
2011	Propriété interdite	Benoît	Hélène Angel	
2011	Beirut Hotel	Mathieu	Danielle Arbid	TV movie
2012	What's in a Name ?	Pierre	Alexandre de La Patellière & Matthieu Delaporte	
2012	Comme un homme	Pierre Verdier	Safy Nebbou	
2012	Nos retrouvailles	Philippe Cabrera	Josée Dayan	TV movie
2012	Le reste du monde	The lawyer	Damien Odoul	TV movie
2013	It Boy	Luc Apfel	David Moreau	
2014	The Clearstream Affair	Renaud Van Ruymbeke	Vincent Garenq	
2015	On voulait tout casser	Bilou	Philippe Guillard	
2015	Une nuit au Grévin	Narrator	Patrice Leconte	TV movie
2015	Tu es mon fils	Paul	Didier Le Pêcheur	TV movie
2016	Elle	Richard	Paul Verhoeven	
2016	Le coeur en braille		Michel Boujenah	
2016	Le premier coup	The man	Caroline Proust & Etienne Saldés	Short
2016	Trepalium	Paris	Vincent Lannoo	TV Mini-Series
2016	Marie Curie: The Courage of Knowledge			
2017	The Frozen Dead	Martin Servaz	Laurent Herbiet	TV series
2017	Capitaine Marleau	Carlos Dos Santos	Josée Dayan	TV series (1 episode)
2017	Reinventing Marvin			
2019	Who You Think I Am	Gilles	Safy Nebbou	
2026	A Woman's Life	Henri	Charline Bourgeois-Tacquet	
TBA	Milo †	TBA	Nicole Garcia	

== Theater ==
Year	Title	Author	Director	Notes
1981	The Dybbuk	S. Ansky	Moshe Leiser	
1981	Ça	Sabra Ben Arfa & Charles Berling	Marie-Pierre Meinzel	
1982	Passage Hagard	Compagnie des Mirabelles	Compagnie des Mirabelles	
1983	Dernières Nouvelles de la peste	Bernard Chartreux	Jean-Pierre Vincent	
1984	The Homecoming	Harold Pinter	Stuart Seide	
1984	Entre chiens et loups	Christoph Hein	Bernard Sobel	
1984	Les Orphelins	Jean-Luc Lagarce	Christiane Cohendy	
1985	The School for Wives	Molière	Bernard Sobel (2)	
1986	What Remains of a Rembrandt Torn into Four; Equal Pieces and Flushed Down the Toilet	Jean Genet	Jean-Michel Rabeux	
1986	Der Park	Botho Strauß	Claude Régy	
1986	Les Voisins	Michel Vinaver	Alain Françon	
1986	Succubations d’Incubes	A.P.A.	Charles Berling	
1988	Le Public	Federico García Lorca	Jorge Lavelli	
1988	The Green Cockatoo	Arthur Schnitzler	Michel Didym	
1988–89	Dear Monster	Javier Tomeo	Jacques Nichet	
1990	The Mother and the Whore	Jean Eustache	Jean-Louis Martinelli	
1990	Conversations d'idiots	Dominique Ducos	Walter Le Moli	
1991	Une sale histoire	Jean Eustache & Jean-Noël Picq	Jean-Louis Martinelli (2)	
1992	The Church	Louis-Ferdinand Céline	Jean-Louis Martinelli (3)	
1993	With My Own Hands	Pascal Rambert	Pascal Rambert	
1993	Le Chasseur de lions	Javier Tomeo	Jean-Jacques Préau	
1993	Le Bavard	Louis-René des Forêts	Michel Dumoulin	
1993–94	Merchants of Glory	Marcel Pagnol & Paul Nivoix	Jean-Louis Martinelli (4)	
1995	In a Year of 13 Moons	Rainer Werner Fassbinder	Jean-Louis Martinelli (5)	
1995–96	Roberto Zucco	Bernard-Marie Koltès	Jean-Louis Martinelli (6)	
1996	La Cour des comédiens	Antoine Vitez	Georges Lavaudant	
1996	Ordure (Dreck)	Robert Schneider	Charles Berling (2)	
1997	L'Histoire du soldat	Igor Stravinsky	Emmanuel Plasson	
1998	Oedipus the King	Sophocles	Jean-Louis Martinelli (7)	
2001	Cravate club	Fabrice Roger-Lacan	Isabelle Nanty	
2002	Voyage en Afrique	Jacques Jouet	Jean-Louis Martinelli (8)	
2004	Hamlet	William Shakespeare	Moshe Leiser & Patrice Caurier (2)	
2005	Pour ceux qui restent	Pascal Elbé	Charles Berling (3)	
2006-07	Caligula	Albert Camus	Charles Berling (4)	
2007	L'Histoire du soldat	Igor Stravinsky	Michael Lonsdale	
2008-09	Endgame	Samuel Beckett	Charles Berling (5)	
2009	The Walk	Bernard-Marie Koltès	Michel Didym (2)	
2010	L'Infâme	Roger Planchon	Jacques Rosner	
2010	Le Donneur de bain	Dorine Hollier	Dan Jemmett	
2011	Ithaka	Botho Strauß	Jean-Louis Martinelli (9)	
2012-13	Gould et Menuhin	Christiane Cohendy	Charles Berling (6)	
2013-14	Address Unknown	Kressmann Taylor	Delphine de Malherbe	
2014	Dreck	Robert Schneider	Charles Berling (7)	
2015	A View from the Bridge	Arthur Miller	Ivo van Hove	Pending - Molière Award for Best Actor

== Narrator ==
- March of the Penguins
