= Laurent Capelluto =

Belgian actor (born 1971)

- Born: 16 March 1971 (age 55)
- Occupation: Actor
- Years active: 1999–present

Laurent Capelluto (born 16 March 1971) is a Belgian actor. He has appeared in more than thirty films since 1999.

== Filmography ==
Year	Title	Role	Director	Notes
1999	Les amazones		Elisabeth Clauss	Short
2003	Le tango des Rashevski	Rabin Elie	Sam Garbarski	
2003	L'adorable femme des neiges	Dr. Charret	Jean-Marc Vervoort	TV movie
2003	La vie comme elle va		Jean-Henri Meunier	TV movie
2004	Pour le plaisir	Martial's colleague	Dominique Deruddere	
2004	Un film avec une très bonne histoire		Tiago Mesquita	
2004	Trop jeune pour moi ?	Sami	Patrick Volson	TV movie
2005	La couleur des mots	The blind	Philippe Blasband	
2005	Quai n° 1		Patrick Jamain	TV series (1 episode)
2007	Coquelicots	Fabrice	Philippe Blasband (2)	
2007	Noël 347	The ideal brother	Alice De Vestele & Michaël Bier	Short
2007	Melting Pot Café	The real estate	Jean-Marc Vervoort (2)	TV series (6 episodes)
2008	A Christmas Tale	Simon	Arnaud Desplechin	International Cinephile Society Award for Best Ensemble; Nominated - Alliance of Women Film Journalists - Best Ensemble Cast; Nominated - César Award for Most Promising Actor
2008	Eau de vie	The man	Nadia Benzekri	Short
2009	OSS 117: Lost in Rio	Kutner	Michel Hazanavicius	Nominated - Magritte Award for Best Supporting Actor
2009	Mr. Nobody	Man in Black	Jaco Van Dormael	
2009	Pour un fils	Pierre	Alix de Maistre	
2009	La grande vie	Grégoire Spielmann	Emmanuel Salinger	
2009	Hors cadre		Laurence Bibot & Marka	Short
2010	Nothing to Declare	The Ball	Dany Boon	
2010	Lights Out	Yves	Fabrice Gobert	
2010	L'heure bleue	The red glasses man	Alice De Vestele & Michaël Bier (2)	Short
2011	The Long Falling	Denis	Martin Provost	Nominated - Magritte Award for Best Supporting Actor
2011	La permission de minuit	Harold	Delphine Gleize	
2011	Fils unique	Vincent	Miel Van Hoogenbemt	International Filmfestival Mannheim-Heidelberg - Special Mention
2011	Elle ne pleure pas, elle chante	Jérôme	Philippe de Pierpont	
2011	L'amour ou pire encore	Bertrand	Christophe "Jazz" Verdonck	Short
2012	In a Rush	Christian	Louis-Do de Lencquesaing	
2012	Three Worlds	Frédéric	Catherine Corsini	
2012	Amour	Police Officer	Michael Haneke	
2012	Operation Libertad	Guy	Nicolas Wadimoff	
2012	Je me suis fait tout petit	Simon	Cécilia Rouaud	
2013	Le temps de l'aventure	Olivier	Jérôme Bonnell	Magritte Award for Best Supporting Actor
2013	La vie domestique	Mathieu	Isabelle Czajka	
2013	Grand garçon		Marc Zinga	Short
2013	Ingrid fait son cinéma	Laurent	Véronique Jadin	Short
2013	Fable domestique	Adrien	Ann Sirot and Raphaël Balboni	Short
2013	Alias Caracalla, au coeur de la Résistance	Raymond Aroti	Alain Tasma	TV mini-series
2014	The Clearstream Affair	Imah Lahoud	Vincent Garenq	Magritte Award for Best Supporting Actor
2014	Je te survivrai	Dardan	Sylvestre Sbille	
2014	Un petit d'homme	Antoine	Jocelyne Desverchère	Short
2014	Une séparation	Alain	Michaël Bier (3)	Short
2015	I Am a Soldier	Pierre	Laurent Larivière	
2015	I'm All Yours	Doctor Paul Martins	Baya Kasmi	
2015	Tout va bien	The registrar	Laurent Scheid	Short
2015	Les Revenants	The Commander	Frédéric Goupil & Fabrice Gobert (2)	TV series (7 episodes)
2016	Le coeur en braille	Doctor Vergne	Michel Boujenah	
2016	Tsunami	Georges	Jacques Deschamps	
2017	Don't Tell Her	Daniel Kantarian	Solange Cicurel	Nominated - Magritte Award for Best Supporting Actor
2017	Zone Blanche	Siriani	Julien Despaux & Thierry Poiraud	TV series Nominated - ACS Award for Best Actor
2019	The Truth	Journalist	Hirokazu Kore-eda	
2020	Into the Night	Mathieu	Inti Calfat & Dirk Verheye	TV series (6 episodes)
2020	My Best Part	Jean-François	Nicolas Maury	
2022	For My Country	General Ledoux	Rachid Hami	
2025	We Believe You		Arnaud Dufeys, Charlotte Devillers	
2026	A Woman's Life	Kamyar	Charline Bourgeois-Tacquet	
2026	Le Faux Soir		Michaël R. Roskam	
