= Lucie Boujenah =

French actress (born 1987)

- Born: 31 July 1987 (age 38); Paris, France
- Education: CNSAD
- Occupation: Actress
- Known for: Soda; Marianne

Lucie Boujenah (born 31 July 1987) is a French actress best known for her role as Jenna in the series Soda, and more recently for her portrayal of Camille in the Netflix series Marianne.

== Life and career ==
Lucie Boujenah was born on 31 July 1987 in Paris. She is the niece of actor and comedian Michel Boujenah and director Paul Boujenah, and the sister of comedian Matthieu Boujenah.

Boujenah appeared in a number of short films before getting her first television role in a 2010 episode of the French police show R.I.S, police scientifique. She began to make a name for herself the following year by playing Jenna in the video series Soda. She made her film debut in 2013 with a small role in the romantic comedy It Boy, followed by an appearance in 24 Days in 2014. In 2016, she played in the comedy Five and had minor roles in Le juge est une femme and Cassandre. Two years later, she made an appearance in Little Tickles.

In 2019, she starred in Edmond by Alexis Michalik and played Camille in the Netflix horror series Marianne.

== Filmography ==
=== Film ===
List of film appearances, with year, title, and role shown
| Year | Title | Role | Notes |
|---|---|---|---|
| 2013 | It Boy | Anissa | |
| 2014 | 24 Days | Julie | Her brother, Matthieu Boujenah, also appears |
| 2016 | Five | Maïa | |
| 2016 | Véra | Marie | |
| 2018 | Little Tickles | Clémentine | |
| 2019 | Edmond | Jeanne d'Alcie | |

=== Television ===
List of film appearances, with year, title, and role shown
| Year | Title | Role | Notes |
|---|---|---|---|
| 2010 | R.I.S, police scientifique | Valérie | 1 episode |
| 2011–14 | Soda | Jenna Malaurie | |
| 2012 | Section de recherches | Nina | 1 episode |
| 2014 | Deux flics sur les docks | Laurie Swaty | |
| 2016 | Alice Nevers – le juge est une femme | Pauline Dubosc | 1 episode |
| 2016 | Cassandre | Victoire Lehman | 1 episode |
| 2017 | Nina | Sophie | 1 episode |
| 2019 | Marianne | Camille | 6 episodes |
