= Female Agents =

2008 French film by Jean-Paul Salomé

- Theatrical release poster
- Directed by: Jean-Paul Salomé
- Written by: Laurent Vachaud; Jean-Paul Salomé
- Produced by: Éric Névé
- Starring: Sophie Marceau; Julie Depardieu; Marie Gillain; Déborah François; Moritz Bleibtreu
- Cinematography: Pascal Ridao
- Edited by: Marie-Pierre Renaud
- Music by: Bruno Coulais
- Distributed by: TFM Distribution
- Release dates: 5 March 2008 (France); 27 June 2008 (UK)
- Running time: 112 minutes
- Country: France
- Languages: French; German; English
- Budget: $19.6 million
- Box office: $9.3 million

Female Agents (French: Les Femmes de l'ombre) is a 2008 French historical drama film directed by Jean-Paul Salomé and starring Sophie Marceau, Julie Depardieu, Marie Gillain, Déborah François, and Moritz Bleibtreu. Written by Salomé and Laurent Vachaud, the film is about female resistance fighters in the Second World War. Jean-Paul Salomé, the director, drew inspiration from an obituary in The Times newspaper of Lise de Baissac (Lise Villameur) from Mauritius (then a British colony), one of the heroines of the SOE, named "Louise Desfontaines" in the film and played by Sophie Marceau. The film was partly funded by BBC Films.

== Plot ==
In May 1944 Louise Desfontaines, a member of the French Resistance, flees to Spain after her husband is killed, where she is captured and later expatriated to London. She is recruited by the Special Operations Executive (SOE), the secret spy and sabotage service initiated by Winston Churchill. Louise is given an urgent first mission: to extricate a British army geologist, who fell into German hands while reconnoitering French beaches to prepare for the invasion of Normandy. The geologist has not yet revealed anything but time is pressing.

Louise must first create a commando group of women especially chosen for the needs of the operation. When it comes to recruitment, anything goes: lies, blackmail, bribery (through the offer of remission of a death sentence) and calls to carry out patriotic duty. She first employs Suzy Desprez, a cabaret dancer who excels in the art of seducing men. Then she brings in Gaëlle Lemenech, a chemist and explosives expert. Finally she selects Jeanne Faussier, a prostitute capable of killing in cold blood. After their arrival in Normandy, they are joined by Maria Luzzato, an Italian Jew and radio operator.

The mission gets under way well, but quickly becomes complicated. They are obliged to return to Paris, where the SOE gives them a new, almost suicidal, objective: to eliminate Colonel Heindrich, one of the key figures of Nazi counter-espionage. He knows too much about the planned landings.

== Cast ==
- Sophie Marceau as Louise Desfontaines
- Julie Depardieu as Jeanne Faussier
- Marie Gillain as Suzy Desprez
- Déborah François as Gaëlle Lemenech
- Moritz Bleibtreu as SS-Standartenführer Karl Heindrich
- Maya Sansa as Maria Luzzato
- Julien Boisselier as Pierre Desfontaines
- Vincent Rottiers as Eddy
- Volker Bruch as SS-Obersturmführer Becker
- Xavier Beauvois as Claude Granville
- Robin Renucci as Melchior
- Colin-David Reese as Colonel Maurice Buckmaster
- Jurgen Mash as Generalfeldmarshall Gerd von Rundstedt
- Conrad Cecil as Le géologue anglais, a British army geologist
- Alexandre Jazede as René Bourienne
- David Capelle as Bernard Quesnot
- Wolfgang Pissors as Médecin train
- Chantal Garrigues as Mme Duchemin
- James Gérard as Officier anglais 1
- Johannes Oliver Hamm as Major SS train
- David Van Severen as Caporal Pioche
- Sarah Tullamore as Nurse hôpital anglais
- Yves Heck as Conducteur métro
- Stéphane Foenkinos as Contrôleur train
- Alex Lutz as a Soldier

== Reception ==
While the film received generally positive reviews from French critics, certain resistance veterans from the time have criticised it saying it portrayed them as "coerced into joining the resistance", not joining through patriotism.

The film won the Radio-Canada Audience Award at the 2010 edition of the Cinéfranco film festival.
