= In Praise of Love =

In Praise of Love may refer to:

- In Praise of Love (play), 1973 play by Terence Rattigan
- In Praise of Love (film), unrelated 2001 film directed by Jean-Luc Godard
