= Cherchez la femme (disambiguation) =

Cherchez la femme is a French phrase which literally means "look for the woman."

It may also refer to:

- "Cherchez La Femme", song performed by Dr. Buzzard's Original Savannah Band and later by Gloria Estefan
- Last song on Fabulous Poodles eponymous debut
- Some Like It Veiled (Cherchez la femme), French film
- A perk in the videogame Fallout: New Vegas
