= Cabbage soup (disambiguation) =

Cabbage soup is a soup featuring cabbage. It may also refer to:

- Shchi, a cabbage soup of Eastern European origins
- La Soupe aux choux ('Cabbage Soup'), a French film
