= Favrot =

Favrot can refer to:

- George K. Favrot
- Favrot & Livaudais
- Gisèle Favrot
