= A Woman's Life (2026 film) =

2026 film by Charline Bourgeois-Tacquet

- French: La Vie d'une Femme
- Directed by: Charline Bourgeois-Tacquet
- Written by: Charline Bourgeois-Tacquet; Fanny Burdino
- Produced by: David Thion
- Starring: Léa Drucker; Mélanie Thierry; Charles Berling; Laurent Capelluto; Marie-Christine Barrault
- Cinematography: Noé Bach
- Edited by: Clément Pinteaux
- Production company: Les Films Pelléas
- Distributed by: Pyramide Distribution
- Release dates: 13 May 2026 (Cannes); 9 September 2026 (France)
- Running time: 98 minutes
- Countries: France; Belgium
- Language: French

A Woman's Life (French: La Vie d'une Femme) is a 2026 comedy drama film directed by Charline Bourgeois-Tacquet, co-written by Bourgeois-Tacquet and Fanny Burdino. It stars Léa Drucker, Mélanie Thierry, Charles Berling, Laurent Capelluto, and Marie-Christine Barrault.

The film had its world premiere in the main competition of the 79th Cannes Film Festival on 13 May 2026, where it competed for the Palme d'Or and Queer Palm. It was theatrically released in France by Pyramide Distribution on 9 September 2026.

== Premise ==
Gabrielle is a middle-aged childless surgeon whose life is consumed by her work and responsibilities. When a writer observes her at work for a novel, her life begins to change.

== Cast ==
- Léa Drucker as Gabrielle, a maxillofacial surgeon
- Mélanie Thierry as Frida, a novelist
- Charles Berling as Henri, Gabrielle's husband
- Laurent Capelluto as Kamyar, Gabrielle's friend and co-worker
- Marie-Christine Barrault as Arlette, Gabrielle's mother who has Alzheimer's disease
- Suzanne de Baecque
- Erri De Luca

== Production ==
A Woman's Life marks writer-director Charline Bourgeois-Tacquet's second feature film, after Anaïs in Love (2021), and was written in collaboration with Fanny Burdino. During the writing process, Bourgeois-Tacquet herself shadowed a female surgeon at a hospital.

The film was produced by David Thion at Les Films Pelléas. It was also co-produced by Jacques-Henri Bronckart and Tatjana Kozar at Versus Production, Arte France Cinéma, Auvergne-Rhône-Alpes Cinéma, and La Femme Qui Aimait Les Films.

Principal photography began on 11 March 2025 and lasted through May 2025. The film was shot in Lyon, Villeurbanne, Grézieu-la-Varenne, Chaponost, and Meyzieu. Noé Bach served as director of photography.

== Release ==
Be For Films owns the international sales rights to the film, which was presented at the European Film Market in February 2026. It had its world premiere in the main competition of the 79th Cannes Film Festival on 13 May 2026, where it competed for the Palme d'Or. Ahead of its premiere, The Hollywood Reporter released a promotional clip from the film. The film was theatrically released in France by Pyramide Distribution on 9 September 2026.

== Reception ==
=== Critical response ===
On the review aggregator website Rotten Tomatoes, 91% of 22 critics' reviews are positive, with an average rating of 6.8/10. Metacritic, which uses a weighted average, assigned the film a score of 65 out of 100, based on 10 critics, indicating "generally favorable" reviews.

Peter Bradshaw of The Guardian gave the film a rating of three out of five stars, deeming it a "hectic, garrulous, breezily agreeable comedy of midlife emotional upheaval". Guy Lodge of Variety called the film "finely textured" and wrote that it "reinvents no wheels but its details are specific and rewarding", comparing it to the works of Mia Hansen-Løve. Jon Frosch of The Hollywood Reporter noted that the film "isn't exactly earth-shaking", but called it "buoyant and affecting". Several critics, including Pete Hammond of Deadline and Kate Erbland of IndieWire, commended Léa Drucker's performance as Gabrielle.

=== Accolades ===
| Award | Date of ceremony | Category | Recipient(s) | Result | Ref. |
|---|---|---|---|---|---|
| Cannes Film Festival | 23 May 2026 | Palme d'Or | Charline Bourgeois-Tacquet | Nominated | |
