= Bruno Putzulu =

French actor

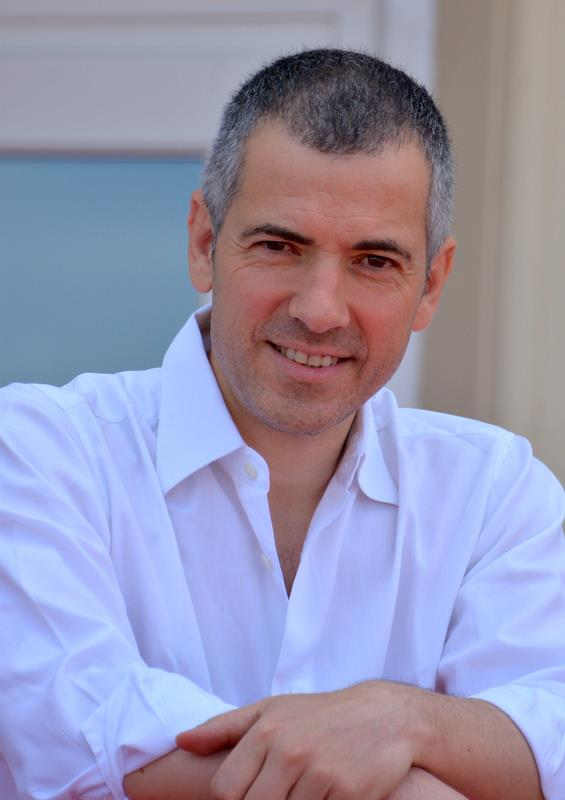
- Bruno Putzulu at the 2014 Cabourg Film Festival
- Born: 24 May 1967 (age 58); Toutainville, Eure, France
- Occupation: Actor
- Years active: 1994–present
- Website: http://www.brunoputzulu.fr

Bruno Putzulu (born 24 May 1967) is a French actor, born in Toutainville, France.

== Life and career ==
Born to a Sardinian father, Bruno Putzulu was born and raised in Toutainville, Haute-Normandie. Although he liked football, he chose an acting career. He entered the CNSAD in 1990 and the Comédie-Française from 1994 to 2003, where he found his friend from the University of Rouen, Philippe Torreton.

Torreton recommended him to Bertrand Tavernier, who hired him for his 1995 film The Bait (L'Appât), which revealed him to the general public.

He was dismissed by the Comédie-Française in 2002 due to his strong personality. In 2003, he played in Monsieur N. by Antoine de Caunes alongside Philippe Torreton.

He appeared in 32 films and 24 television films as well as in the TV series "Ici, tout commence".

== Filmography ==
=== Feature films ===
- 1994: Emmène-moi by Michel Spinosa
- 1994: Jefferson in Paris by James Ivory
- 1995: The Bait by Bertrand Tavernier
- 1995: Marie-Louise ou la Permission by Manuel Flèche
- 1995: Mécaniques célestes by Fina Torres
- 1995: Les Aveux de l'innocent by Jean-Pierre Améris
- 1995: Un héros très discret by Jacques Audiard
- 1997: Petits Désordres amoureux by Olivier Péray
- 1998: Une minute de silence by Florent Emilio Siri
- 1998: Le Sourire du clown by Eric Besnard
- 1999: Les Passagers by Jean-Claude Guiguet
- 1999: Why Not Me? by Stéphane Giusti
- 1999: Les gens qui s'aiment by Jean-Charles Tacchella
- 1999: Virilité by Roman Girre
- 1999: De l'amour by Jean-François Richet
- 2001: Éloge de l'Amour by Jean-Luc Godard
- 2001: (Entre nous) by Serge Lalou
- 2001: Lulu by Jean-Henri Roger
- 2002: Irene by Ivan Calbérac
- 2002: Lilly's Story by Roviros Manthoulis
- 2003: Les Clefs de bagnole by Laurent Baffie (simple apparition)
- 2003: Dans le rouge du couchant by Edgardo Cozarinsky
- 2003: Monsieur N. by Antoine de Caunes
- 2003: Father and Sons by Michel Boujenah
- 2003: Tout pour l'oseille by Bertrand Van Effenterre
- 2004: Holy Lola by Bertrand Tavernier
- 2004: Les gens honnêtes vivent en France / La gente honrada by Bob Decout
- 2004: Belhorizon by Inès Rabadan
- 2006: Dans les cordes by Magaly Richard-Serrano
- 2007: La Fabrique des sentiments by Jean-Marc Moutout
- 2014: L'Art de la fugue by Brice Cauvin

=== Short films ===
- 1996: Nord pour mémoire, avant de le perdre by Isabelle Ingold and Viviane Perelmuter
- 1998: Le Réceptionniste by Ivan Calbérac
- 2000: Guedin by Frédy Busso

=== TV films ===
- 1997: La Famille Sapajou by Élisabeth Rappeneau
- 1999: Georges Dandin by Bernard Stora
- 2002: La Tranchée des espoirs by Jean-Louis Lorenzi
- 2003: La Place de l'autre by Roberto Garzelli
- 2004: Le Temps meurtrier by Philippe Monnier
- 2006: Un amour de fantôme by Arnaud Sélignac
- 2006: Chez Maupassant : Deux amis by Gérard Jourd'hui
- 2007: Le Diable en embuscade by Jean-Pierre Mocky
- 2016: Baisers cachés by Didier Bivel

== Awards ==
- Césars 1996: Nominated in the category of the "best new actor" for Les Aveux de l'innocent by Jean-Pierre Améris
- Césars 1999: César in the category of the "best new actor" for Petits Désordres amoureux by Olivier Péray
