= Olivier Sitruk =

French comedian, actor and producer

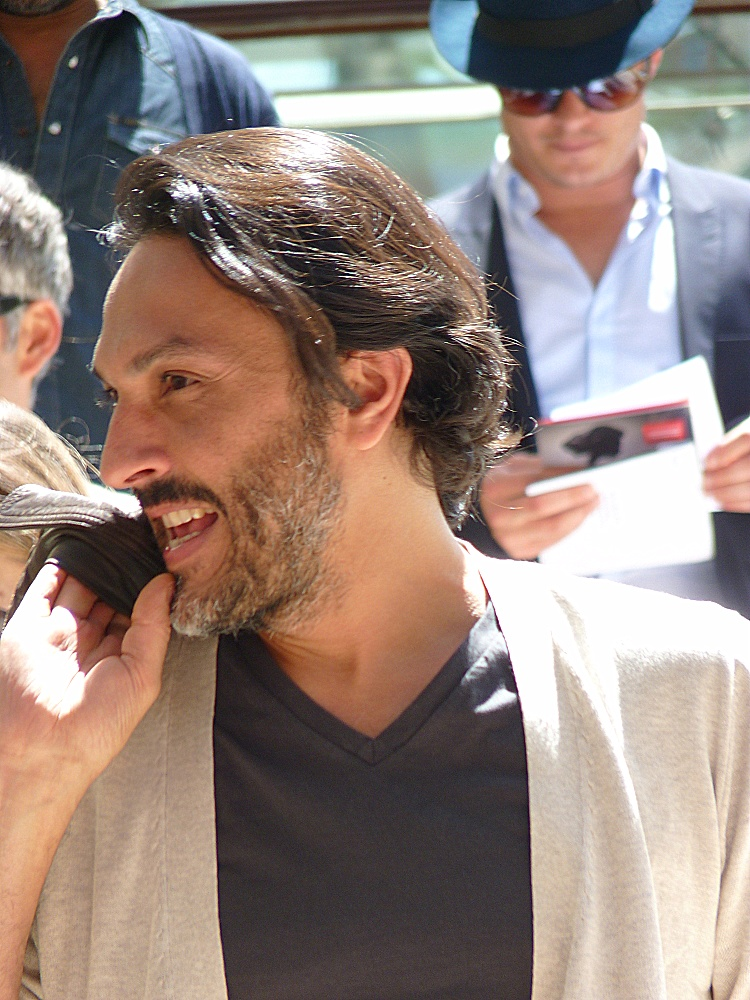
- Olivier Sitruk at the 52nd Monte-Carlo Television Festival
- Born: 25 December 1970 (age 55); Nice, Alpes-Maritimes, France
- Occupations: Actor, producer
- Years active: Since 1992

Olivier Sitruk (born December 25, 1970) is a French comedian, actor, and producer, who has appeared in 44 films and television shows.

Sitruk was born in Nice, Alpes-Maritimes, France. After considering a career as an archaeologist, Sitruk changed his mind and discovered a passion for theater in high school. At age 16, he began his acting career, enrolling in the Conservatoire National de Nice.

Sitruk made his English-language movie premiere in 2008, starring alongside Shirley MacLaine and Barbora Bobuľová in the Lifetime original biographical film, Coco Chanel. The television movie debuted on September 13, 2008, with a viewership of 5.2 million, the second-highest rated made-for-TV film of 2008. Sitruk played Boy Capel, a self-made man who was "the love of [Chanel's] life."

He is related to actor Jules Sitruk and former Chief Rabbi of France Joseph Sitruk. He has been married to actress Alexandra London since 2003.

== Films ==
- 2016 :
  - Dieumerci !
- 2008 :
  - Coco Chanel with Shirley MacLaine, Barbora Bobuľová
- 2007 :
  - Fracassés (Fragments) with Matthieu Boujenah, Armelle Deutsch, Vincent Desagnat
- 2005:
  - Cavalcade as Steve Suissa, with Marion Cotillard, Titoff, Estelle Lefébure
  - Avant qu'il ne soit trop tard with Frédéric Diefenthal, Édouard Montoute, Élodie Navarre, Émilie Dequenne, Arthur Jugnot
- 2004 :
  - Le Grand Rôle as Steve Suissa with Stéphane Freiss, Bérénice Bejo, Stéphan Guérin-Tillié
  - Mariage Mixte with Olivia Bonamy, Gérard Darmon
- 2002 :
  - Irène as Luca with Cécile de France, directed by Ivan Calberác
  - Guerreros as French Army Soldier Marceau, directed by Daniel Calparsoro
- 2001 :
  - HS Hors Service
  - Mémoire Morte
- 2000 :
  - L’envol
  - Passeurs de rêves
- 1997 : Quatre Garçons pleins d'avenir with Stéphan Guérin-Tillié, Thierry Lhermitte
- 1995 : Un dimanche à Paris
- 1994 : The Bait (L'Appât) as Bertrand Tavernier, a performance which earned him a Cesar Award as Most Promising Actor. He co-starred with Bruno Putzulu and Marie Gillain, among others.
- 1992 : Le nombril du monde
- 1991 : La gamine

=== Television ===
- 2014
  - La France a un incroyable talent as judge in hury
- 2007 :
  - Bible Code as Philippe Carrese
  - L'Arche de Babel as Philippe Carrese
  - Divine Emilie as Arnaud Sélignac
  - Un Admirateur secret with Thierry Neuvic, Claire Keim
  - Confidences sur canapé as Laurent Dussaux
- 2006 :
  - La volière aux enfants with Marilou Berry
  - Les Camarades as François Luciani
  - Jeff & Léo, Flics et jumeaux - series – lead role (8 episodes) :

Season 2 - 8 episodes :

La beauté du diable
Il faut sauver Alice
Meurtre en blanc
Grand froid
Convoyeurs de fonds
Une chute interminable
Le placard
Dernier tango

- 2005 : Quelques mots d'amour (La lettre)
- 2004:
  - Brasier
  - Jeff & Léo, Flics et jumeaux - series – lead role (6 episodes):

Season 1 - 6 episodes :

Un train peut en cacher un autre
Entre deux étages
Le mystère des bijoux
Un mystère de trop
La dernière séance
Jardin Zen

- 2003 : 3 Garçons, 1 fille, 2 mariages
- 2002 :
  - Lune Rousse
  - Aurélien with Romane Bohringer, Clément Sibony
  - L’année de mes 7 ans
  - Traquée
- 2001 :
  - Génération Start Up
  - Femmes de loi, episode « Une occasion en or »
- 2000 : L’Algérie des chimères
- 1998 : La Femme de l'Italien
- 1997 : Les Moissons de l'Océan, with Dominique Guillo
- 1996 :
  - Profession Infirmière, episode « Sacha »
  - Le Rouge et le Noir as Jean-Daniel Verhaeghe with Kim Rossi Stuart
- 1995 :
  - Les Allumettes Suédoises as Jacques Ertaud
  - Entre ces mains-là
  - La Veuve de l'architecte as Philippe Monnier
