= Thierry Liagre =

French actor (1951–2021)

- Born: 15 June 1951; Grenoble, France
- Died: 17 August 2021 (aged 70); Beauvais, France
- Occupation: Actor

Thierry Liagre (15 June 1951 – 17 August 2021) was a French actor.

== Biography ==
Born on 15 June 1951 in Grenoble, Liagre began acting in the 1980s after studying at the Cours Simon. He was known for appearing in films, on television, and onstage, particularly at the Théâtre La Bruyère.

Thierry Liagre died on 17 August 2021 in Beauvais at the age of 70.

== Filmography ==
=== Cinema ===
- The Cabbage Soup (1981)
- Guy de Maupassant (1982)
- Paradis pour tous (1982)
- Banzaï (1983)
- Until September (1984)
- Le Débutant (1986)
- My Best Pals (1989)
- My New Partner II (1990)
- One Can Always Dream (1991)
- La Totale! (1991)
- Les Visiteurs (1993)
- Crimson Rivers II: Angels of the Apocalypse (2004)
- Love Me No More (2008)
- Paris 36 (2008)
- Amélie au pays des Bodin's (2010)
- War of the Buttons (2011)

=== Television ===
- Marie Pervenche (1983–1988)
- Vincente (1984)
- Le Théâtre de Bouvard (1985)
- Maguy (1985–1994)
- Drôles d'histoires (1988)
- Navarro (1989–2006)
- Maigret (1991–2005)
- Les Années FM (1992)
- Julie Lescaut (1992–2012)
- La Classe (1993)
- Seconde B (1993–1994)
- Le juge est une femme (1994–2012)
- Jamais deux sans toi...t (1996)
- Quai n° 1 (1996)
- Les vacances de l'amour (1996–2004)
- Une femme d'honneur (1996–2007)
- Pour être libre (1997)
- Femmes de loi (2000–2009)
- Commissaire Cordier (2005–2007)
- David Nolande (2006)
- Les Mystères de l'amour (2017)
