= Space Soap (La Soupe aux choux) =

2005 single by Mister Cosmic vs Fat Dog

Single by Mister Cosmic vs Fat Dog

from the album Bon ça c'est fait!
- Released: 27 June 2005 (France)
- Length: 3:08
- Label: Sony BMG Music

Mister Cosmic vs Fat Dog singles chronology
"Space Soap (La Soupe aux choux)" (2005)	"La Bonne du curé" (2006)

"Space Soap (La Soupe aux choux)" is a novelty single, released in 2005 in France. It was produced by Mister Cosmic vs Fat Dog, from their first album Bon ça c'est fait!.

This instrumental is a remake of the theme of La Soupe aux choux, a 1981 French film directed by Jean Girault.

== Chart performance ==
"Space Soap (La Soupe aux choux)" peaked at number three in France on 9 November 2005, with 19,397 sales that week, reaching this position after 19 weeks of presence. It remained on the chart for five weeks in the top five, 13 weeks top 10, 27 weeks top 50, and 34 weeks in the top 100.

After this unexpected success, the two DJs recorded a second single, "La Bonne du curé" (a remake of the Annie Cordy song), under the name 'Fat Dog "Puppy" & Mister Cosmic "Cosmic Cleaner". It peaked at #22 on 28 January 2006.

== Track listing ==
CD single

1. "Space Soap (La soupe aux choux)" by Mister Cosmic — 3:08
2. "I'm Not Scooby Doo" by Fat Dog — 2:54
3. "What Is Love?" by Mister Cosmic — 3:18
4. "My Name Is Fat Dog" by Fat Dog — 3:22

Tracks are also available via digital download.

== Certifications and sales ==
Country	Certification	Date	Sales certified
France	Gold	13 October 2005	250,000

== Charts ==
=== Weekly charts ===
Chart (2005)	Peak position
Belgium (Ultratop 40 Wallonia)	15
Europe (European Hot 100 Singles)	13
France (SNEP)	3

=== Year-end charts ===
Chart (2005)	Position
Belgium (Ultratop 40 Wallonia)	94
Europe (Eurochart Hot 100)	57
France (SNEP)	13
