= Heartstrings (2016 film) =

2016 French comedy drama film

- Film poster
- French: Le Coeur en Braille
- Directed by: Michel Boujenah
- Screenplay by: Michel Boujenah; Alfred Lot
- Based on: Le Coeur en Braille by Pascal Ruter
- Produced by: Sidonie Dumas; Ariel Zeitoun
- Starring: Alix Vaillot; Jean-Stan DuPac; Charles Berling
- Cinematography: Vincent van Gelder
- Music by: Philippe Jakko
- Production company: Gaumont
- Distributed by: Gaumont
- Release date: 28 December 2016 (France)
- Running time: 85 minutes
- Country: France
- Language: French

Heartstrings (French: Le Coeur en Braille is a 2016 French comedy-drama film based on the 2012 novel Le Coeur en Braille by Pascal Ruter.

== Plot ==
Marie, a serious student who is passionate about playing the cello, wants to join the conservatory, but is losing her eyesight. She befriends Victor, who falls in love with her and decides to help her succeed, all the while keeping her handicap a secret.

== Cast ==
- Alix Vaillot as Marie
- Jean-Stan DuPac as Victor
- Charles Berling as Marie's father
- Antoine Khorsand as Haicam
- Ilan Levi as Étienne
- Noah Levi as Marcel
- Vincent Taloche as Mr. Azra
- Aude Ruyter as Marie's mother
- Max Garang-Boulègue as Romain
- Laurent Capelluto as Dr. Vergne
- Florence Guérin as Contest host
