= Sophie Tapie =

French singer and actor

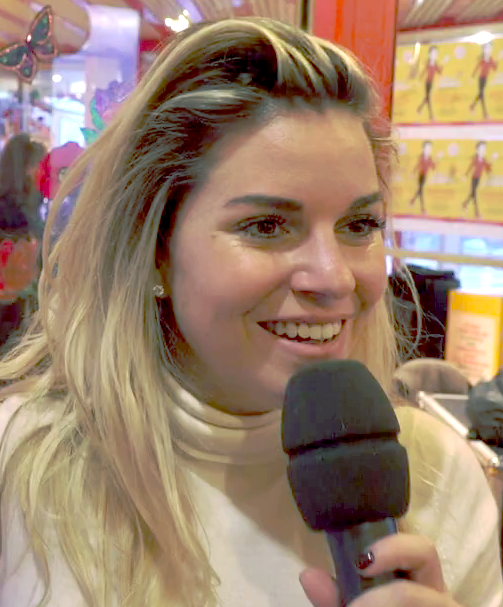
Sophie Tapie (2019)

Sophie Tapie (born 20 February 1988 in the 12th arrondissement of Paris) is a French singer and comedian.

== Biography ==
Sophie Tapie is the daughter of Bernard Tapie. Her first acting role was on television in the series Commissaire Valence (2004), in which her father played the lead role. In 2004, she joined the Cours Eva Saint-Paul theatre school in Paris. In 2006, she moved to London to attend the Arts Educational Schools.

In 2008, after returning to France, she performed in the comic play Oscar at the Théâtre du Gymnase, alongside Bernard Farcy and Chantal Ladesou, only to find her father on stage at her side a few years later. Later, she became a host on the TV channel 13ème Rue.

In 2012 she was a contestant on season 2 of The Voice on TF1.

In 2014, she appeared in Alexandre Arcady's film 24 Days, about the murder of Ilan Halimi, playing the role of lieutenant Vogel.

In 2015, she released her first country music album Sauvage.

She enjoys horse riding, and notably participated in the Chantilly Jumping at the Chantilly Racecourse.

She sang the French national anthem at the opening of the 2022 French Grand Prix.

== Filmography ==
=== Television ===
- 2004: Commissaire Valence
- 2012: Le Jour où tout a basculé (episode 167 season 2): Audrey

=== Cinema ===
- 2014: 24 jours d'Alexandre Arcady: Lieutenant Vogel

== Theatre ==
- 2008: Oscar by Claude Magnier, directed by Philippe Hersen at the Théâtre du Gymnase: Julie Barnier

== Discography ==
=== Studio albums ===
- 2015: Sauvage
- 2021: 1988
- 2022: 1988 renaît de ses cendres

=== Singles ===
- 2015: Noël Lachance (tel est mon destin)
- 2015: Des milliards de petits corps
- 2015: J’envoie en l’air
- 2018: We Love
- 2020: Malaisant
- 2021: L’amour en solde (with Jok'Air)
- 2022: Pas vu pas pris
