= William Lebghil =

French actor

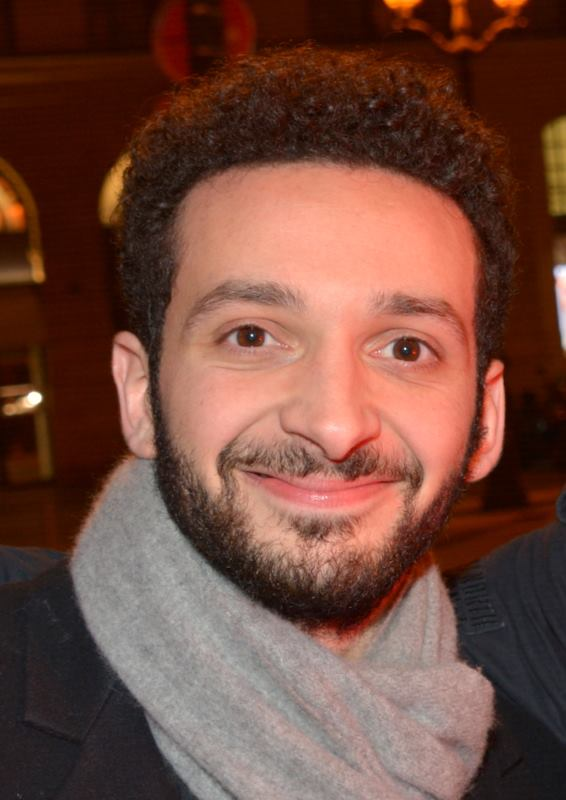
- William Lebghil at the "Cesar Award Révélations 2017"
- Born: 9 July 1990 (age 35); France
- Occupation: Actor
- Years active: 2005–present

William Lebghil (born 9 July 1990) is a French actor.

== Filmography ==
| Year | Title | Role | Director | Notes |
|---|---|---|---|---|
| 2011 | Les Mythos | Karim | Denis Thybaud | |
| 2011-2015 | Soda | Slimane Elboughi | Nath Dumont & Jean-Michel Ben Soussan | TV series (690 episodes) |
| 2012 | Fuck UK | Karim | Benoît Forgeard | Short |
| 2014 | Love at First Fight | Xavier | Thomas Cailley | |
| 2014 | Jacky in Women's Kingdom | Vergio | Riad Sattouf | |
| 2014 | Les aoûtiens | Joël | Hugo Benamozig & Victor Rodenbach | Short |
| 2015 | Memories | Karim | Jean-Paul Rouve | |
| 2015 | The New Adventures of Aladdin | Khalid | Arthur Benzaquen | |
| 2015 | Qui de nous deux | Léo | Benjamin Bouhana | Short |
| 2015 | SODA : le rêve américain | Slimane Elboughi | Nath Dumont | TV movie |
| 2016 | La fine équipe | Omen | Magaly Richard-Serrano | |
| 2016 | Après Suzanne | Simon | Félix Moati | Short |
| 2016 | Victor ou la piété | Abdel | Mathias Gokalp | Short |
| 2017 | C'est la vie! | Seb | Éric Toledano and Olivier Nakache | |
| 2017 | Some Like It Veiled | Mahmoud | Sou Abadi | |
| 2017 | Pigeons & Dragons | Various | Nicolas Rendu | TV series (7 episodes) |
| 2018 | Première année | Benjamin Sitbon | Thomas Lilti | Pending - César Award for Most Promising Actor; Nominated - Lumière Award for Best Male Revelation |
| 2018 | Ami-ami | Vincent | Victor Saint Macary | |
| 2018 | Voyez comme on danse | Alex | Michel Blanc | |
| 2019 | Yves | | | |
| 2025 | The Safe House | | Lionel Baier | In competition at the 75th Berlin International Film Festival |
| 2025 | Nino | Sofian | Pauline Loquès | |

== Theater ==
| Year | Title | Author | Director | Notes |
|---|---|---|---|---|
| 2005 | Héros Tougézeur | Dorothée Moreau, Olivier Solivères & Augustin De Monts | Olivier Solivérès | Festival d'Avignon |
| 2006 | Les trois petits cochons Attaks | Olivier Solivérès | Olivier Solivérès | Festival d'Avignon |
| 2009 | Two Timid Souls | Eugène Marin Labiche | Olivier Solivérès | Comédie des 3 bornes |
| 2010 | Ados | Olivier Solivérès | Olivier Solivérès | Comédie des 3 bornes & Point-Virgule |
| 2010-2014 | The Hunchback of Notre-Dame | Victor Hugo | Olivier Solivérès | Théâtre Antoine-Simone Berriau & Point-Virgule |
| 2012-2013 | Shear Madness | Paul Pörtner | Sébastien Azzopardi | Théâtre des Mathurins |
