= Irene (2002 film) =

2002 film

- Theatrical release poster
- Directed by: Ivan Calbérac
- Written by: Ivan Calbérac; Benoît Labourdette; Éric Assous
- Produced by: Thierry De Navacelle
- Starring: Cécile de France; Bruno Putzulu
- Cinematography: Vincent Mathias
- Edited by: Diane Logan
- Distributed by: SND Films
- Release date: 26 June 2002
- Running time: 98 minutes
- Country: France
- Language: French
- Budget: $2.2 million
- Box office: $1 million

Irene is a 2002 French drama film directed by Ivan Calbérac. It is about a young woman living and working in Paris when she falls in love with her boss. She hopes for a romantic relationship between the two, but a lie from her boss cause problems between the two.

== Cast ==
- Cécile de France - Irène
- Bruno Putzulu - François
- Olivier Sitruk - Luca
- Estelle Larrivaz - Sophie
- Agathe de La Boulaye - Salomé
- Patrick Chesnais - Gazet
- Évelyne Buyle - Jacqueline
