= La Totale! =

1991 French comedy film

- Theatrical release poster
- Directed by: Claude Zidi
- Written by: Simon Michaël; Claude Zidi; Didier Kaminka
- Produced by: Jean-Louis Livi
- Starring: Thierry Lhermitte; Miou-Miou; Eddy Mitchell; Michel Boujenah
- Cinematography: Jean-Jacques Tarbès
- Edited by: Nicole Saunier
- Music by: Vladimir Cosma
- Production companies: Films 7; Film Par Film; Paravision International; M.D.G. Productions; TF1 Films Production
- Distributed by: AMLF
- Release date: 18 December 1991 (France)
- Running time: 102 minutes
- Country: France
- Language: French
- Box office: $12.3 million

La Totale! (English: The Total, a French expression roughly meaning "the complete package") is a 1991 French spy comedy film directed by Claude Zidi and starring Thierry Lhermitte, Miou-Miou, Eddy Mitchell and Michel Boujenah. It centers on a spy (Lhermitte) who lives a double life as an ordinary white collar worker, with his family unaware of his true identity. Meanwhile his wife (Miou-Miou), bored by their monotonous life, begins an affair with a con artist pretending to be a spy (Boujenah).

The film was released in France by AMLF on December 18, 1991. It was later the basis for director James Cameron's 1994 action comedy True Lies.

== Plot ==
François Voisin lives a double life. By day he is a telecommunications employee, and at night he is a secret agent known by the moniker l'Épée ("The Sword").

François is coming home on his 40th birthday, for which his wife has secretly prepared a surprise party with old friends with whom he used to fence. He is called back by his colleague Albert for a mission involving planting a microphone in an arms smuggler's car. He succeeds after a struggle. As he arrives home, his friends mock his "boring" life.

The planted microphone leads the Secret Service to a prostitute. After infiltrating her apartment and planting a camera, they discover she is helping a missile expert and the smuggler to meet. They then intercept and destroy a missile convoy. Meanwhile, François' wife, Hélène, is living a monotonous life.

Hélène then meets Simon, who claims to be a spy, but is actually a car dealer living in a caravan, who uses the ruse to seduce women. François discovers Hélène is meeting someone in secrecy and believes she is cheating. He uses the agency's resources to spy on her and find out more about Simon. When Simon lures Hélène to his caravan, François kidnaps both of them. He makes his wife believe that Simon is a terrorist and then makes Hélène believe she has to work for the agency to secure her freedom. She is unaware that François is behind this, and gets sent to a hotel room for a mission where he plans on surprising her. At this point, they both get kidnapped by henchmen of the arms dealer. After François admits his true identity to Hélène, he manages for them to escape. They thwart the arms dealer's plan of blowing up a football stadium in Paris and all ends well.

The film concludes with François' 41st birthday. He and Hélène, now working together as secret agents, capture the famous terrorist Carlos the Jackal, who turns out to be Simon pretending to be Carlos.

== Cast ==
- Thierry Lhermitte as François Voisin
- Miou-Miou as Hélène Voisin
- Eddy Mitchell as Albert "Einstein" Grelleau
- Michel Boujenah as Simon/Marcel
- Jean Benguigui as Sarkis
- Annick Alane as Pascaline
- Claudine Wilde as Vanessa
- François Hadji-Lazaro as Braquet
- Yan Epstein as Izmir
- Sagamore Stévenin as Julien Voisin
- Jean-Guillaume Le Dantec as Paul
- Pierre Pellerin as Gérard
- Alain Stern as Philippe
- Thierry Liagre as Vincent
- Paulina Zidi as Paulina Voisin
- Fabienne Chaudat as the accountant

== Remake ==
La Totale! was remade into the American action comedy film True Lies (1994), directed by James Cameron, starring Arnold Schwarzenegger and Jamie Lee Curtis in the lead roles.

== Plagiarism lawsuit ==
In 2000, Claude Zidi and James Cameron were both sued by screenwriter Lucien Lambert, who claimed La Totale!, and consequently its remake True Lies, were plagiarized from his 1981 screenplay Émilie, about a con artist who poses as a spy in order to seduce a woman. Lambert and Zidi had previously worked together on an unproduced remake of Belphegor, or Phantom of the Louvre. Lambert had pitched the script to several producers, without success, and eventually adapted into a stage play, which was translated to English and stage in the United States.

In 2001, the court ruled against Lambert, which he appealed. In June 2004, the Court of Appeal of Paris ruled in favor of Lambert, based on new evidence. Claude Zidi was ordered to pay Lambert US$15 million (his profit percentage for the box office receipts of True Lies). Cameron was not held liable for damages, as the Court ruled he had purchased the film rights to La Totale! in good faith.
