= All About Yves =

2019 film

- Film poster
- Directed by: Benoît Forgeard
- Written by: Benoît Forgeard
- Produced by: Emmanuel Chaumet
- Starring: Doria Tillier; William Lebghil
- Cinematography: Thomas Favel; Yannig Willmann
- Edited by: Maryline Monthieux
- Music by: Bertrand Burgalat; MIM
- Production company: Ecce Films
- Distributed by: Le Pacte
- Release date: 23 May 2019 (Cannes)
- Running time: 107 minutes
- Country: France
- Language: French

All About Yves, also known as Yves, is a 2019 French comedy film directed by Benoît Forgeard. It was screened in the Directors' Fortnight section at the 2019 Cannes Film Festival.

== Cast ==
- Doria Tillier as So Balotelli
- William Lebghil as Jérem Roudet
- Antoine Gouy as Yves (voice)
- Philippe Katerine as Dimitri
- Alka Balbir
- Darius as Roger Phila

== Plot ==
A fictitious French company, Digital Cool, has developed an advanced refrigerator with near AI capability. It places two beta models with potential users to learn the results of their interactions with the apparatus. A French couple (played by Balbir and Katerine) host one of the units, named Vincent; a single French man, Jerem, receives the other, named Yves.

Jerem is a wannabe music developer, currently working out of his garage, and basically going nowhere careerwise. He is initially repelled by the refrigerator as it criticizes his diet, opines on current events, and physically blocks Jerem from his unhealthy eating habits. But when the company sends a statistician (So) to monitor his interactions with the unit, his attitude changes as he tries to win her attention and affection.

The three-way interaction between the two humans and the almost-human appliance is explored in the remainder of the film. Yves is able to transform rap lyrics into Auto-Tuned online success, while giving dating tips to Jerem. It eventually leads to a rap showdown, followed by an absurd three-way.
