= Paul Boujenah =

French-Tunisian film director

- Born: Tunis, Tunisia
- Occupation: Film director
- Relatives: Michel Boujenah (brother); Matthieu Boujenah (cousin); Lucie Boujenah (cousin)

Paul Boujenah is a French-Tunisian film director.

He is the brother of Michel Boujenah and the uncle of siblings Matthieu Boujenah and Lucie Boujenah.

== Selected filmography ==
Year	Title	Director	Writer	Notes
1981	Fais gaffe à la gaffe!	Yes	Yes	
1983	Le Faucon	Yes	Yes	
1986	Yiddish Connection	Yes	No	
1989	Moitié-moitié	Yes	Yes	
1994	Le Voleur et la menteuse	Yes	Yes	
