= Marianne (TV series) =

French horror television series

- Genre: Supernatural horror; Drama
- Created by: Samuel Bodin
- Written by: Samuel Bodin; Quoc Dang Tran
- Directed by: Samuel Bodin
- Starring: Victoire Du Bois; Lucie Boujenah; Tiphaine Daviot; Mireille Herbstmeyer
- Music by: Thomas Cappeau
- Country of origin: France
- Original language: French
- No. of seasons: 1
- No. of episodes: 8

Production
- Producers: Pascal Breton; Henri Debeurme; Raphaël Rocher; Kristine De Los Santos; Lionel Uzan
- Cinematography: Philip Lozano
- Editors: Dimitri Amar; Olivier Galliano; Richard Riffaud
- Running time: 36–52 minutes
- Production companies: Empreinte Digitale and Federation

Original release
- Network: Netflix
- Release: 13 September 2019

Marianne is a French supernatural horror television series created and directed by Samuel Bodin, written by Bodin and Quoc Dang Tran and starring Victoire Du Bois, Lucie Boujenah, and Tiphaine Daviot. The plot revolves around the young novelist Emma who realizes that the characters she writes in her horror novels have appeared in the real world. The series was released on 13 September 2019 on Netflix. It was canceled after one season in January 2020.

== Plot summary ==
The story tells of powerful witchcraft in the countryside of France, starting with a woman hanging herself in front of her childhood friend, Emma. Afterwards Emma returns to her village seeking answers about her friend's death.

== Cast ==
- Victoire Du Bois as Emma Larsimon
- Lucie Boujenah as Camille
- Tiphaine Daviot as Aurore
- Ralph Amoussou as Séby
- Bellamine Abdelmalek as Arnaud
- Mehdi Meskar as Tonio
- Alban Lenoir as Inspector Ronan
- Mireille Herbstmeyer as Mrs Daugeron
- Corinne Valancogne as Mrs Larsimon
- Patrick d'Assumçao as Fr Xavier
- Pierre Aussedat as Mr Larsimon
- Luna Lou as Teen Emma
- Charlie Loiselier as Teen Aurore
- Bruni Makaya as Teen Séby
- Adam Amara as Teen Arnaud
- Anna Lemarchand as Teen Caroline
- Délia Espinat-Dief as Marianne

== Episodes ==
No.	Title	Directed by	Written by	Original release date
1	"Your Dreams" "Tu les rêves"	Samuel Bodin	Samuel Bodin; Quoc Dang Tran	13 September 2019
Best-selling author Emma Larsimon announces she’s done writing horror and has killed off her main character. Caroline, a school friend from childhood, visits and tells Emma that her mother believes she is Marianne, the witch from Emma's books. She shows the witch charm her mother had, made from human skin. Emma, disturbed, tells her assistant Camille that as a child, she had nightmares about Marianne. Emma's boyfriend Pierre leaves her, fed up with her drinking and behavior. Caroline hangs herself in public, warning that her mother will take Emma’s parents next. Emma and Camille stop at Madame Daugeron’s, Caroline's mother, who exhibits bizarre behavior. At Emma's parents' house, Camille is attacked by Emma’s possessed father. Emma's parents walk into the woods naked, with bloody symbols all over their bodies.
2	"Tradition" "C'est coutume !"	Samuel Bodin	Samuel Bodin; Quoc Dang Tran	13 September 2019
Inspector Samuel Ronan shows up to investigate Emma's parents' disappearance and discovers the human skin witch charm on the Larsimon’s door. Emma and Camille break into Daugeron's house; Emma finds her book with a strange language written in it. There is one room in the house they cannot get into; however, Daugeron returns and begins to cut her own arm, telling Emma that she must write. Inspector Ronan's friend Pat tells him that whoever has the witch charm is cursed. Emma reunites with the Shipwreck punks, her high school gang, (Aurore, Seby, Tonio, and Arnaud (No-No), though Aurore is apprehensive of her due to something that happened at the lighthouse 15 years prior. No-No sends Camille the scathing infamous school article Emma wrote about her mother when she was 15. Emma, angry that Camille read it, begins to write a new chapter as Emma’s mother is shown walking through town naked and disoriented.
3	"Not an Easy Person" "Je ne suis pas un cadeau"	Samuel Bodin	Samuel Bodin; Quoc Dang Tran	13 September 2019
Tonio and No-No discover five drowned cows at sea, mirroring what Emma wrote in her new chapter. Emma’s mother returns to the Larsimon home. Emma and Camille meet Seby's pregnant wife, Sophie, and her son, Hugo. Hugo goes missing; Emma directs them to the lighthouse after recalling her new chapter, in which five kids were hung. They find Hugo and four other kids hanging, and save the children. Emma realizes that what she writes comes true and attempts an exorcism on Daugeron but it doesn't work. Inspector Ronan finds Emma's father; he is now in a coma in hospital after being found in an abandoned building surrounded by witch charms. Emma finds her mom stabbed to death and Daugeron laughing with the knife. Enraged, she strangles Daugeron, who warns that Marianne will just possess someone close to her. Camille attempts to perform CPR on Daugeron but suddenly sees Marianne, causing her to fall down the stairs as a mist escapes Daugeron's mouth.
4	"Beautiful Moment" "C'est un beau moment"	Samuel Bodin	Samuel Bodin; Quoc Dang Tran	13 September 2019
Camille goes into a coma and is put in the hospital. Daugeron is arrested and no longer possessed but Marianne took her eyes as “she never leaves empty handed”. Daugeron tells Emma that Marianne has existed even before Emma but the two are somehow connected and Emma must write. Ronan finds Daugeron’s husband in the locked room in her house, and a book with a cursed language written inside. Pat explains that knowing the witch's name is the only thing that gives them power over it and the symbol in the book is the seal of Beleth, a demon king. Sophie gives birth to a son. Ronan reads the Molitor Report, the record of the witch trials from the church; it details Marianne Basselin's tragic life, culminating in her killing her husband and proclaiming to be the wife of Beleth. She was caught, declaring that she would return to take the town's children. That night, Marianne haunts Emma, Tonio, and Aurore and steals Seby’s newborn son.
5	"You Left Her" "Tu l'as laissée…"	Samuel Bodin	Samuel Bodin; Quoc Dang Tran	13 September 2019
A flashback reveals what happened at the lighthouse when Emma and her friends were 15. Emma had continuous nightmares of Marianne that caused her to wet the bed. The group holds a seance at the lighthouse to tell the entity to leave Emma alone. However, Marianne possesses Emma and predicts the terrible future of each person in the group, telling Caroline she will hang her, Seby that his children will be hers, and so on. The group gets angry, thinking Emma was pretending. The next day, while Emma is playing hide and seek with Aurore’s little sister Lucy, Marianne traps Lucy in a freezer, killing her. Emma goes to Father Xavier for help, who tells her that Marianne has attached herself to Emma and she must leave town to protect her loved ones. This is why Emma wrote the hurtful article about her mother and rebelled, causing her parents to send her away. On the day she is to leave, Seby comes to say he knows this isn't really her and they kiss. In present day, Seby arrives to tell Emma that Marianne has taken his son.
6	"Memories" "Pour les souvenirs ?"	Samuel Bodin	Samuel Bodin; Quoc Dang Tran	13 September 2019
Inspector Ronan reveals to Emma that the incidents from her horror novels have happened in real-world tragedies over the years. As part of the plot to take down Marianne, Emma tries to write her death but fails. As plan B, Inspector Ronan, Emma, Seby, No-No, and Aurore go to the lighthouse to try to summon Marianne so they can trap her spirit in the body of Father Xavier's dog, which they've brought along. At first, it doesn’t appear to have worked. At the hospital, Marianne has possessed Camille, witnessed by Emma's father, who has awakened. When Ronan summons her however, Marianne leaves Camille and possesses Ronan instead, causing him to kill himself in front of the horrified group.
7	"Too Young to Handle" "On était trop petit"	Samuel Bodin	Samuel Bodin; Quoc Dang Tran	13 September 2019
In the past, a young priest fails to burn Marianne’s body when she attacks him, allowing her to remain free to haunt Elden. In the present, Marianne possesses Father Xavier’s dog, causing the group to scatter and separate as they flee. Lucy appears to Aurore, revealing that Emma was there when she died, something Emma never told her. The group reconvene and Marianne attacks Aurore, threatening to take her next. Seby and No-No tell Emma she must write, which Emma tries to refuse, wanting to fight back. No-No is taken by Marianne after he volunteers himself in place of Aurore. A defeated Emma returns home and writes again, causing Seby’s son to be returned to him. Seby visits Emma and the two have a one night stand to make up for what they never did as teens. The next morning, Father Xavier attacks Emma in her home and begins an exorcism on her.
8	"Tuesday" "On est mardi"	Samuel Bodin	Samuel Bodin; Quoc Dang Tran	13 September 2019
As the priest makes a desperate bid to banish Marianne, Emma finds herself torn between two worlds, and Aurore searches for a way to save her friend.

== Reception ==
The series holds a 100% score -- indicating "Fresh" -- on review aggregator Rotten Tomatoes, based on 16 reviews with an average rating of 8.2/10. The website's critics consensus reads, "Smart and scary with the most unsettling pair of eyes since Nicolas Cage in Vampire's Kiss, Marianne is pure nightmare fuel."
