= Father and Sons =

2003 French-Canadian comedy film

- French: Père et Fils
- Directed by: Michel Boujenah
- Written by: Michel Boujenah; Edmond Bensimon; Pascal Elbé
- Produced by: Frédéric Bourboulon; Sidonie Dumas; Luc Vandal; Ariel Zeitoun
- Starring: Philippe Noiret; Charles Berling
- Cinematography: Patrick Blossier
- Edited by: Jennifer Augé
- Music by: Michel Cusson
- Production company: Gaumont
- Distributed by: Gaumont Buena Vista International
- Release date: 16 May 2003 (Cannes Film Festival)
- Running time: 95 minutes
- Countries: France; Canada
- Language: French
- Budget: 5.3 million euros
- Box office: $6,935,839 worldwide

Father and Sons (French: Père et Fils) is a 2003 French-Canadian comedy film directed by Michel Boujenah.

== Synopsis ==
Leo is neglected by his children David, Max, and Simon, and two of them are estranged. Afraid of dying without seeing his boys reconcile, he invents a serious illness to force them to take a trip to Quebec with him.

== Cast ==
- Philippe Noiret as Léo Serrano
- Charles Berling as David Serrano
- Bruno Putzulu as Max Serrano
- Pascal Elbé as Simon Serrano
- Marie Tifo as Mado
- Geneviève Brouillette as Hélène
- Pierre Lebeau as Jacques
- Jacques Boudet as Joseph
- Matthieu Boujenah as Julien
- Céline Thiou as Martine
- Eva Saint-Paul as Francine
- Franck Giordanengo as Biker
- Nathalie Dherbey as Nurse
- Joseph Malerba as Eric
