= 24 Days =

2014 French drama film

- Film poster
- Directed by: Alexandre Arcady
- Produced by: Alexandre Arcady
- Starring: Zabou Breitman; Pascal Elbé; Jacques Gamblin; Sylvie Testud; Éric Caravaca
- Cinematography: Gilles Henry
- Edited by: Manu De Sousa
- Music by: Armand Amar
- Production companies: Alexandre Films; New Light Films
- Distributed by: Paradis Films; Menemsha Films
- Release date: 30 April 2014 (France)
- Running time: 110 minutes
- Country: France
- Language: French
- Box office: $1.1 million

24 Days (French: 24 jours, la vérité sur l'affaire Ilan Halimi — lit. 24 Days: The True Story of the Ilan Halimi Affair) is a French drama film directed by Alexandre Arcady released in 2014. It examines The Affair of the Gang of Barbarians of January 2006.

== Synopsis ==
On a Friday night of January 2006, after Shabbat dinner with his mother (Zabou Breitman) and sister, 23-year-old Ilan Halimi (Syrus Shahidi) receives a phone call. Ilan quickly arranges to meet up with the caller, a beautiful young woman, and is subsequently attacked and kidnapped by a gang. The following afternoon, the Halimi family are sent a harrowing online message demanding a ransom for Ilan's return. Ilan's parents, Ruth and Didier Halimi (played by Pascal Elbé), immediately contact the police.

The police, failing to recognize the anti-Semitism behind the attack, treat Ilan's case as a normal kidnapping. The film depicts the next 24 days, in which the Halimi family receives over 700 threatening phone calls from Ilan's kidnappers. Tensions rise between the family and the police assigned to their case, as days go by without Ilan's safe return. Eventually, more is discovered about Ilan's kidnapper (Tony Harrisson Mpoudja), who seems to be in multiple places at once. The film is a chilling depiction of the real-life events surrounding the attack, and presents a commentary on growing anti-Semitism in France.

== Cast ==
- Zabou Breitman as Ruth Halimi
- Pascal Elbé as Didier Halimi
- Jacques Gamblin as Commandant Delcour
- Sylvie Testud as Brigitte Farell
- Éric Caravaca as Lieutenant Fernandez
- Syrus Shahidi as Ilan Halimi
- Alka Balbir as Yaël Halimi
- Audrey Giacomini as Mony
- Pauline Cheviller as Anne-Laure Halimi
- Olivier Sitruk as Raphy
- Kevin Elarbi as Karim
- Tony Harrisson Mpoudja as Youssouf Fofana
- Olivier Barthelemy as Jérôme Ribeiro
- Matthieu Boujenah as Johan
- Pierre Abbou as Lieutenant Dussault
- Emilie Caen as Lieutenant Barsac
- Marc Robert as Capitaine Garcin
- Sophie Tapie as Lieutenant Vogel
- Romain Guillaume as voice analysis investigator
- Alexis Michalik as Lieutenant Joubert
- Donia Eden as Emma
