= Morgan Sportès =

French screenwriter

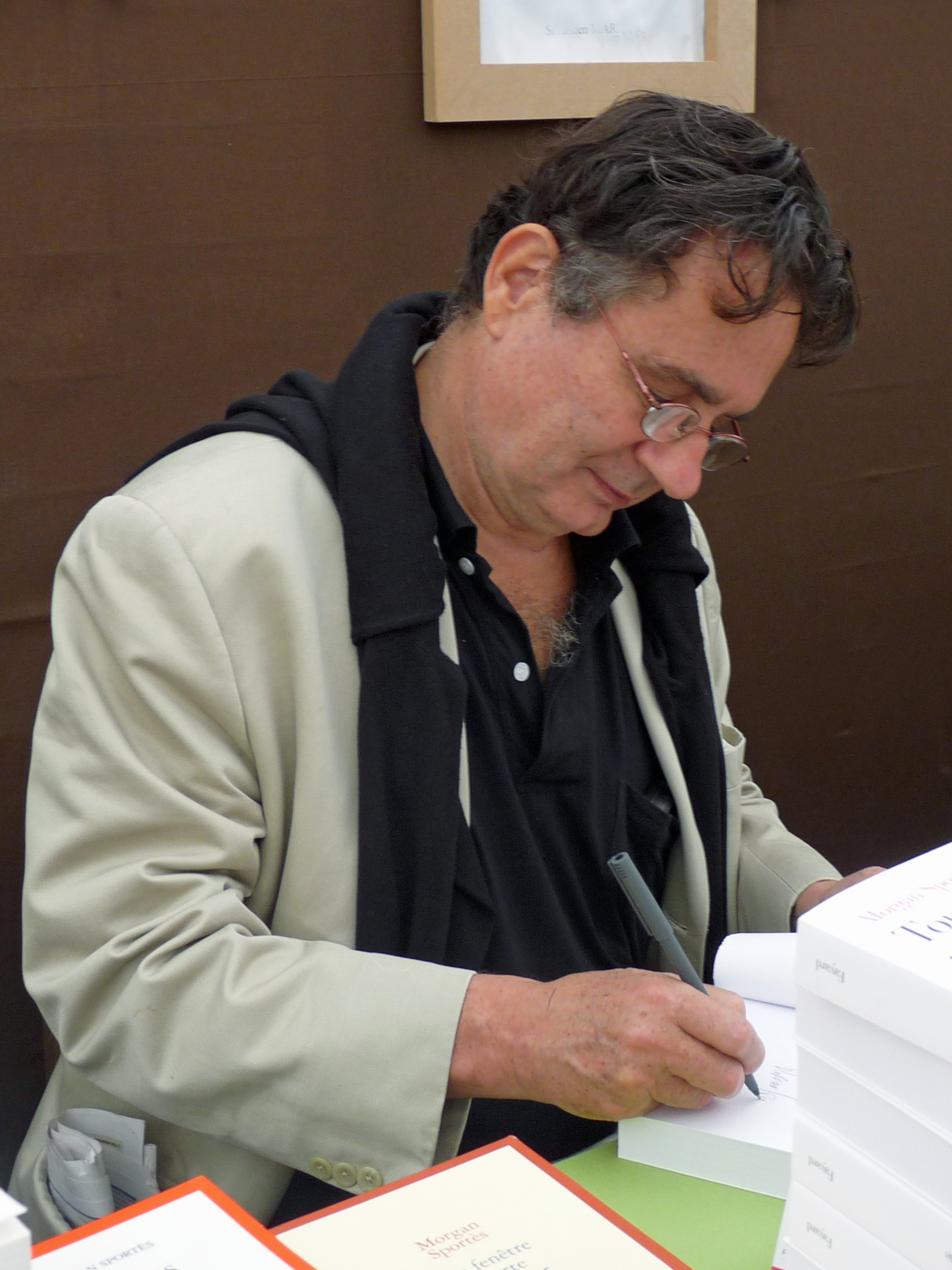
- Born: 1947 (age 78–79); Algiers
- Occupation: Writer
- Writing career
- Notable work: Maos
- Notable awards: Prix Renaudot des lycéens

Morgan Sportès is a French writer. He was born in Algiers in 1947. The author of more than 20 books, he has won the Prix Renaudot des lycéens (2006) for Maos, and the Prix Interallié (2011) and the Globes de Cristal (2012) for his novel Tout, tout de suite. Another novel L'Appât (1990) was turned into an award-winning movie by Bertrand Tavernier.
