= Claudine Wilde =

German film and television actress (born 1967)

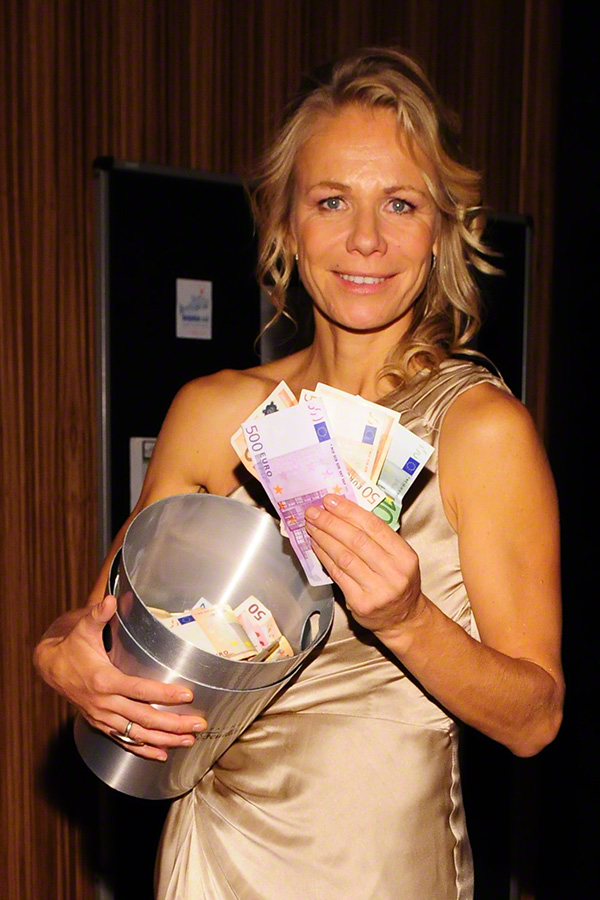
- Claudine Wilde (2013)
- Born: 15 March 1967 (age 59); West Berlin, West Germany
- Occupation: Actress
- Years active: 1990–present
- Height: 5 ft 7.5 in (1.71 m)
- Spouse: Tomás Kanok (2001–2011) (divorced)
- Children: 2

Claudine Wilde (born 15 March 1967) is a German film and television actress.

== Early life ==
Claudine Wilde was born in West Berlin and grew up in the South of France. She received a three-year acting training at the Conservatory of Dramatic Arts in Saint-Étienne and one year at James Logan School in San Francisco Bay Area.

== Career ==
She has appeared in many television films and series such as Captive in Yemen, Das Papst-Attentat, as well as The Old Fox, Siska and Tatort, playing major or minor roles.

Wilde has also appeared in French productions especially in theater like Les Misérables engaged in Saint-Étienne.

- 1991 : La Totale!
- 1991 : Room service
- 1998 : Venise est une femme
- 2003 : Josephine, Guardian Angel (1 Episode : "Belle à tout prix")
- 2011 : Mince alors!

== Personal life ==
Wilde was married from 2001 to 2011 to Czech engineer Tomás Kanok, they separated in 2009. The couple have two sons.

Wilde is fluent in German, English and French. She also has basic knowledge in Spanish and Italian.
