= Sarah Tullamore =

Sarah Tullamore is an English-born actress, singer, dancer and voice-over artist.

== Biography ==
Tullamore was born in Carshalton, a suburb of the London Borough of Sutton, England and grew up in Banstead.

She began her vocal career as a child singer with the Coloma Girls' School Choir, one of the largest school choirs in Southern England. Choral activities included regular sell-out concerts at the Fairfield Halls, Croydon, international singing tours and regular recordings of the children's programmes Singing Together and Time and Tune for BBC Radio.

After graduating with honours in linguistic science, Tullamore lived in Tokyo, Japan, working in live and studio singing and voice-over work before moving to Paris, France in 1995.

== Career ==
From 1995 to 1998, she sang with the Jazzberries, a female jazz vocal trio featuring Peggy Connelly and Wendy Taylor. The trio performed at major clubs and festivals throughout France.

In 1999, she sang the title role in the musical Pocahontas at Disneyland Resort Paris. In 2003, she participated in the original cast recording of Blanche Neige (Snow White) staged at the Folies Bergère. In 2005, Tullamore recorded in English and French the singing and spoken voice of Alice for the Disney show Le pays des merveilles, and toured Japan for five weeks, and again in 2007, in a musical theatre extravaganza with the Broadway Musical Company.

Her one-woman musical Estelle Bright premiered in France at the Avignon Festival in 2005. Estelle Bright then ran at theatres in Paris in 2006 and 2007. The show was nominated in the Best Musical category at the Musicals Festival in Béziers, France in 2007. Tullamore and her director Frederic Baptiste originally wrote the musical in French and later translated it into English. In 2009, the English version of the show premiered at the Mill Studio, Guildford, UK with additional performances in November 2009 at the Playhouse in Salisbury, Wiltshire.

Her voice-over work in Paris includes regular appearances on French radio stations such as Fun Radio, Skyrock and NRJradio. She was the official female continuity announcer of the TV channel Eurosport from 2005 to 2007. Her voice also features in major advertising spots, children's CDs and the TV series Largo Winch.

Tullamore toured France in the summer of 2009 as lead singer in the French National Lottery Summer show, a visual extravaganza on Europe's biggest mobile stage combining dance, circus acts and song. She had a featured role in the 2009 Alain Sachs production of La Vie Parisienne.

She featured in the 2012–14 French production of the musical Sister Act as Soeur Marie-Antoinette (the equivalent of Mary Martin of Tours in the English production) at the Théâtre Mogador in Paris co-produced by Whoopi Goldberg and Stage Entertainment. She was also first cover for the roles of Mother Superior and Mary Lazarus.

In 2015, she featured in the roles of Dora Bailey and Miss Phoebe Dinsmore in the Kilworth House Theatre production of Singing in the Rain.

In 2016, her one-woman musical show London – Paris – Roam ! featured at the Paris Fringe theatre festival and the Edinburgh Festival Fringe.

Tullamore sings with the jazz group Le Cinq'tet.

== Film ==
Tullamore features as the English nurse in the 2008 French film Les Femmes de l'ombre (Female Agents), directed by Jean-Paul Salomé and starring Sophie Marceau.
