= Les Gens qui s'aiment =

- Directed by: Jean-Charles Tacchella
- Written by: Jean-Charles Tacchella
- Produced by: Gérard Jourd'hui
- Starring: Richard Berry; Jacqueline Bisset; Julie Gayet; Bruno Putzulu
- Cinematography: Dominique Chapuis
- Edited by: Anna Ruiz
- Music by: Raymond Alessandrini
- Release date: October 1999
- Running time: 90 minutes
- Countries: France; Belgium; Luxembourg; Spain
- Language: French

Les Gens qui s'aiment is a 1999 French-language dramedy written and directed by Jean-Charles Tacchella. It stars Richard Berry and Jacqueline Bisset. It was released in France on 5 July 2000.

== Plot ==
Jean-Francois (Berry) is the presenter of a love story-based radio show, he himself has a long-term erratic open relationship with Angie (Bisset). Angie has two daughters, the eldest is the married archetypal housewife, a lifestyle Angie cannot understand. But Winnie, her youngest feels restrained by the strangleholds of a traditional relationship.

== Cast ==
- Richard Berry as Jean-Francois
- Jacqueline Bisset as Angie
- Julie Gayet as Winnie
- Bruno Putzulu as Laurent
- Marie Collins as Juliette the Housekeeper
