= In Praise of Love (film) =

2001 film by Jean-Luc Godard

- French theatrical release poster
- Directed by: Jean-Luc Godard
- Written by: Jean-Luc Godard
- Produced by: Alain Sarde; Ruth Waldburger
- Starring: Bruno Putzulu; Cecile Camp
- Cinematography: Julien Hirsch; Christophe Pollock
- Edited by: Raphaëlle Urtin
- Distributed by: ARP Sélection
- Release dates: 15 May 2001 (Cannes); 16 October 2001 (United States)
- Running time: 97 minutes
- Countries: France; Switzerland
- Language: French

In Praise of Love (French: Éloge de l'amour) is a 2001 French film written and directed by Jean-Luc Godard. The black-and-white and color drama was shot by Julien Hirsch and Christophe Pollock. Godard has famously stated that "a film should have a beginning, a middle and an end, but not necessarily in that order." This aphorism is illustrated by In Praise of Love (Éloge de l'amour), which reverses the order of past and present. It was selected as the Swiss entry for the Best Foreign Language Film at the 74th Academy Awards, but it was not nominated.

In Praise of Love polarized film critics. While some prominent reviewers were highly negative toward the work, others consider it to be one of the best films of its decade.

== Plot ==
The first half of the film, shot on black and white film, follows a man named Edgar who is working on an undefined "project" about what he considers the four stages of love: meeting, physical passion, separation, and reconciliation, involving people at three different stages of life: youth, adulthood, and old age. Edgar keeps flipping through the pages of an empty book, staring intently as if waiting for words to appear. He is unsure whether the project should be a novel, a play, an opera, or a film. In Paris, he interviews potential participants from all walks of life (including those people Victor Hugo dubbed les misérables, whom Edgar considers important to the project), but is continually dissatisfied. The person Edgar really wants is someone he met two years ago, a woman who "dared speak her mind." At the urging of his financial backer Mr. Rosenthal, an art dealer whose father once owned a gallery with Edgar's grandfather, Edgar tracks down the woman, named Berthe, where she is working at night cleaning passenger cars at a railroad depot. Berthe remembers Edgar (and marvels at his memory) but emphatically does not want to be involved in his project. She holds down several jobs and also cares for her three-year-old son. Edgar continues to interview people, to his continuing dissatisfaction. He is able to visualize the stages of youth and old age but keeps having trouble with adulthood.

Edgar runs into Berthe at a lecture at a Parisian bookstore by expatriate American journalist Mark Hunter about the Kosovo War. Edgar makes it a point to tell Berthe that Hunter is an example of a "good American." Afterwards, the two wander the city of signs and monuments, talking through the night and into the next day, eventually stopping at an abandoned Renault plant, where they contemplate the collapse of the workers movement. They part company, and later Berthe speaks with Edgar over the phone; they talk about when they first met and she questions him as to why he has stopped talking about his project. They end the conversation with an air of finality. Edgar visits a homeless shelter and selects a man sleeping in one of the beds. In a tender but brief moment, Edgar directs two young people, to whom he had earlier assigned the roles of Perceval and his love Eglantine, to bathe the man in a shower. Mr. Rosenthal is there to witness the scene, but the status of "the project" is unclear. In the final scene of the black and white section, Edgar goes to meet a man who has some news for him about Berthe.

The second section of the film is shot in DV video with over-saturated color. An intertitle announces that it is two years earlier. Edgar arrives in Brittany and is met by the same man he has just seen at the end of part one. The man, a minister of culture for the area, is there to take Edgar to meet Jean Lacouture, whom Edgar proceeds to interview about the role of Catholics in the French Resistance, in connection with a cantata he is writing for Simone Weil. This encounter leads Edgar to meet an elderly couple who fought in the Resistance and have been together ever since. The couple is meeting with delegates from the American state department who are helping to broker a deal on behalf of "Spielberg Associates." The company wants to purchase the rights to the couple's story for a film written by William Styron and starring Juliette Binoche. The couple's granddaughter, in training to be a lawyer, is attempting to get them out of the contract, as they are afraid they have been shortchanged. The granddaughter is Berthe, and this is when she and Edgar first meet. Berthe attempts to nullify the contract by arguing that the signatories are not members of a defined nation, referring to themselves simply as "Americans," when "America" is a term that encompasses two continents with many countries – but it is a futile effort.

After spending time with Berthe, Edgar takes the train back to Paris, and reflects on his encounters. When you think of something ("de quelque chose"), he muses, you are always thinking of something else. If you see a landscape that is new to you, for example, you are comparing it to a landscape you already know. What Edgar cannot know is what awaits him in the future, about which he is informed at the end of the first part of the film – that Berthe commits suicide.

== Cast ==
- Bruno Putzulu as Edgar
- Cecile Camp as Elle (Berthe Samuel)
- Jean Davy as Grandfather
- Françoise Verny as Grandmother
- Audrey Klebaner as Eglantine
- Jérémie Lippmann as Perceval
- Claude Baignières as Mr. Rosenthal
- Remo Forlani as Mayor Forlani
- Mark Hunter as U.S. journalist
- Jean Lacouture as himself (historian)
- Bruno Mesrine as magician
- Philippe Loyrette as Philippe, Edgar's assistant
- Marie Desgranges as woman on bench
- Jean-Luc Godard as man on bench

== Reception ==
=== Critical response ===
The review aggregator Rotten Tomatoes reported that 52% of mainstream critics gave the film positive reviews, based on 73 reviews, with an average score of 5.9/10. The website's critical consensus reads, "Jean-Luc Godard remains a challenging filmmaker with admirable ambition, but In Praise of Love is too self-indulgent and bereft of stylistic pleasure to engage beyond the auteur's most patient fans." Metacritic reported the film had an average score of 64 out of 100, based on 31 reviews, indicating "generally favorable reviews".

The film critic for The New York Times, A.O. Scott, while praising the film also found its anti-American content polemical. He wrote, "In Praise of Love, it must be said, is the most elegant and coherent feature he has made since the mid-1980s. His visual command -- of the velvety shadows of black-and-white 35-millimeter film and the thick, supersaturated tones of digital video -- still has the power to astonish, and his debonair gloom remains seductive. But to continue with the notebook analogy, the decorous prose, graceful penmanship and impressive paper stock cannot disguise the banality of what is written." Film Comment named it one of the top 50 films of the decade (2000s).

Film critic Charles Taylor criticized Godard for "talking about Americans having no stories of their own, no past of their own (he claims we don't even have a name)" and questioned "How can a man who, along with his colleagues in the French new wave, did more than anyone to alert America to the art of its movies, the art we always took for granted, suddenly turn around and proclaim the whole culture worthless?" Film critic Roger Ebert, who gave the film one out of four stars, took issue with scenes in the film in which Godard accuses filmmaker Steven Spielberg of never paying Emilie Schindler for her contributions to his 1993 film Schindler's List, and leaving her impoverished in Argentina. Ebert wrote, "One muses: (1) Has Godard, having also used her, sent her any money? (2) Has Godard or any other director living or dead done more than Spielberg, with his Holocaust Project, to honor and preserve the memories of the survivors?" The claim that Emilie Schindler was living in poverty was also disputed by Thomas Keneally, author of Schindler's Ark, who verified that he had sent her a check himself.

Richard Brody of The New Yorker declared In Praise of Love the greatest film of the 2000s, stating that it is "one of the most unusual, tremulous, and understated of love stories, as well as the story of love itself; ... Godard’s third first film, thus something of a rebirth of cinema." Japanese film critic Shigehiko Hasumi also listed the film as one of the best of the decade, and it was voted one of the thirty best films of the 2000s in a British Film Institute poll for Sight & Sound. Hong Kong Director Ann Hui voted it as her Greatest Films of All Time poll for Sight & Sound in 2002.

=== Accolades ===
Wins

- Valladolid International Film Festival: Jury Special Prize, Jean-Luc Godard; Tied with Va savoir; 2001.
- Fajr Film Festival: Crystal Simorgh, International Competition: Best Film, Jean-Luc Godard; 2002.

Nominations

- Cannes Film Festival: Golden Palm, Jean-Luc Godard; 2001.
- Valladolid International Film Festival: Golden Spike, Jean-Luc Godard; 2001.
- Swiss Film Prize: Swiss Film Prize, Best Film (Bester Spielfilm), Jean-Luc Godard; 2002.

== See also ==
- List of submissions to the 74th Academy Awards for Best Foreign Language Film
- List of Swiss submissions for the Academy Award for Best Foreign Language Film
