= Some Like It Veiled =

- Directed by: Sou Abadi
- Starring: Félix Moati; Camélia Jordana; William Lebghil
- Release date: 15 June 2017 (CFF)
- Running time: 88 minutes
- Country: France
- Language: French
- Budget: $4.6 million
- Box office: $1.7 million

Some Like It Veiled (French: Cherchez la femme) is a 2017 French comedy film directed by Sou Abadi.

== Cast ==
- Félix Moati - Armand
- Camélia Jordana - Leila
- William Lebghil - Mahmoud
- Anne Alvaro - Mitra
- Miki Manojlović - Darius
