= Toutainville =

- Commune
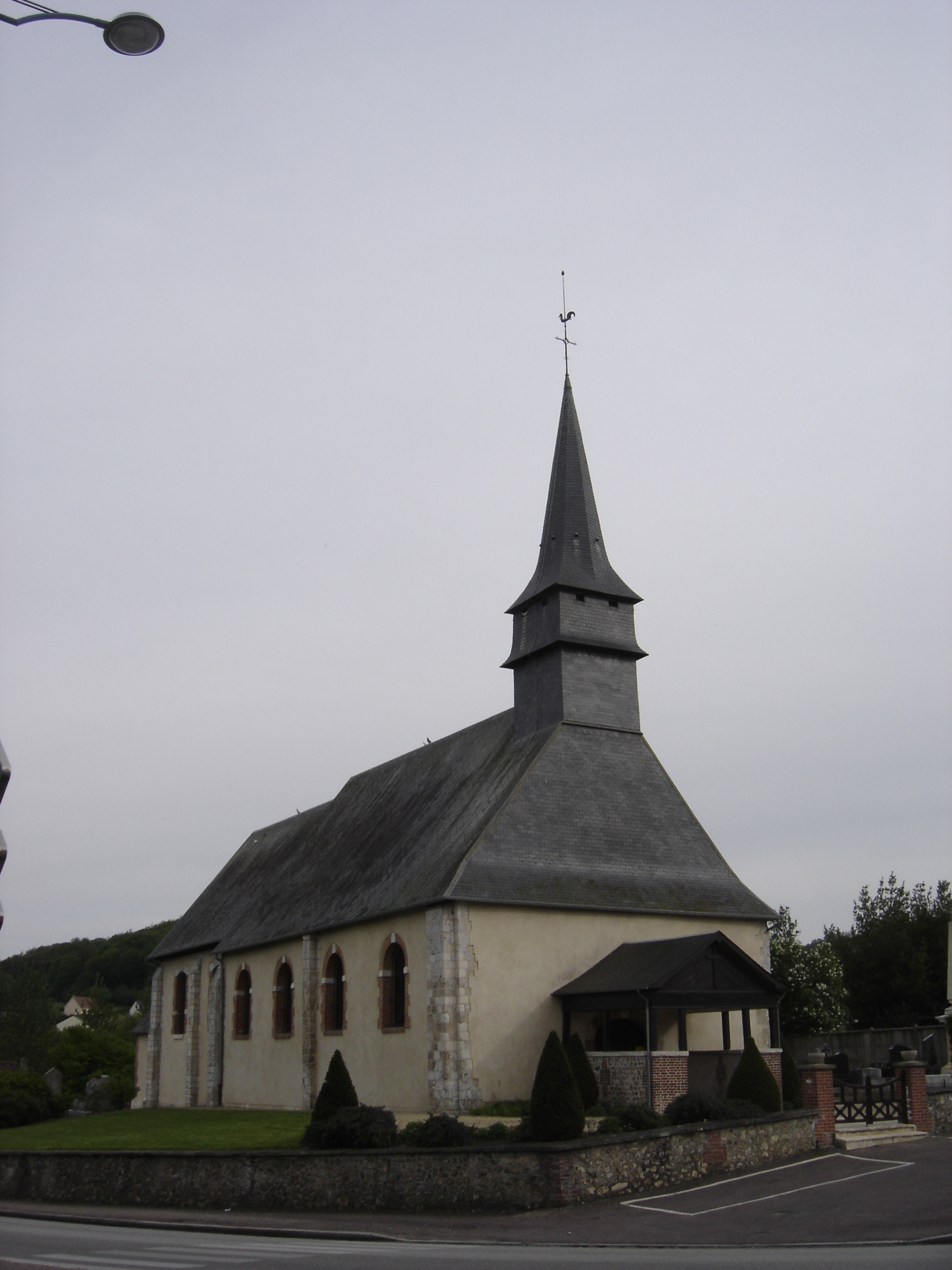
- The church in Toutainville

- Coat of arms
- Location of Toutainville
- Location within France Location within Normandy
- Coordinates: 49°21′52″N 0°27′47″E
- Country: France
- Region: Normandy
- Department: Eure
- Arrondissement: Bernay
- Canton: Pont-Audemer

Government
  - Mayor (2020–2026): Bruno Blas
- Area^{1}: 11.85 km^{2} (4.58 sq mi)
- Elevation: 14 m (46 ft)
- Highest elevation: 126 m (413 ft)
- Lowest elevation: 2 m (6.6 ft)
- Population (2023): 1,274
  - Density: 107.5/km^{2} (278.5/sq mi)
- Time zone: UTC+01:00 (CET)
  - Summer (DST): UTC+02:00 (CEST)
- INSEE/Postal code: 27656 /27500
- ^{1} French Land Register data, which excludes lakes, ponds, glaciers > 1 km^{2} (0.386 sq mi or 247 acres) and river estuaries.

Toutainville (French pronunciation: [tutɛ̃vil]) is a commune in the Eure department in Normandy in northern France.

== Geography ==
The commune along with another 69 communes shares part of a 4,747 hectare, Natura 2000 conservation area, called Risle, Guiel, Charentonne.

== Population ==
Historical population
Year	Pop.	±% p.a.
1968	764	—
1975	971	+3.48%
1982	909	−0.94%
1990	960	+0.68%
1999	1,013	+0.60%
2007	1,112	+1.17%
2012	1,295	+3.09%
2017	1,344	+0.75%
2023	1,274	−0.89%
Source: INSEE

== See also ==
- Communes of the Eure department
