= The Tunisian Association for the Support of Minorities =

General information
- Location: Tunisia
- System: Organization
- Connections: www.atusmi.com

History
- Opened: 29 September 2011

The Tunisian Association for the Support of Minorities (Arabic: الجمعية التونسية لمساندة الأقليات, French: L'Association Tunisienne de soutien aux minorités) or ATSM is a Tunisian non-governmental organization fighting for minority rights, targeting antisemitism in particular.

== History ==
It was founded on the initiative of four people – a medical student, a natural sciences teacher, a lawyer and a physical education teacher – on 29 September 2011, shortly after the Tunisian revolution. Only four months later, the organisation had about fifty members.

The Tunisian Association for the Support of Minorities is committed to defending the rights of religious, cultural, ethnic, sexual, physical and social minorities by campaigning for the adoption of a constitutional text guaranteeing them, as well as to develop and establish the values of diversity in Tunisian society.

In December 2012, the ATSM filed a complaint against an imam for incitement to hatred by a sermon calling for a divine genocide of the Jews which was broadcast on 30 November on Hannibal TV.

Shortly after this, ATMS centers were vandalized and robbed. On 9 January 2013, the association accused the Revolution Protection League of being behind the attack, which occurred on 29 December, the day of commemoration of the deportation of Tunisian Jews, during the Second World War.

In April 2013, after the arrest of the leader of the Tunisian Liberal Party for practicing sodomy the ATSM called for the decriminalization of this sexual practice and to review the legal text relating to it. In June of the same year, the ATSM lodged a complaint against the Carrefour Company which posted a photo of players from the Tunisian national football team distributing bananas to young Sierra Leoneans. In July, its president, Yamina Thabet, announced having received death threats following publication of facts on cohabitation between Muslims and Jews in Tunisia.

In December, the association sponsored a conference on the Holocaust in Tunisia a first in an Arab country, bringing together historians, researchers and writers.

In January 2014, on the 168th anniversary of the abolition of slavery in Tunisia ATSM launched an awareness video about racism against black Tunisians. This action was done under the slogan "Slavery has been abolished but racism is still there".

At the same time, the ATSM denounced the exclusion of minorities in the new Constitution, in particular article 74 which specifies that only a Muslim can be a candidate for the president of Tunisia, as well as article 39 on the rooting of the Arab-Muslim identity in education proposing to replace it by rooting the Tunisian identity.

Following the elimination of the Tunisian national football team during the 2015 Africa Cup of Nations, the ATSM identified cases of verbal assault as well as racist comments, on social networks, targeting Black people.

In 2016, the ATSM called to revoke the act of 5 November 1973 which prohibits the marriage of Muslim Tunisian women with non-Muslims.

== See also ==
- History of the Jews in Tunisia
