= Anaïs in Love =

2021 French comedy film

- International release poster
- French: Les Amours d'Anaïs
- Directed by: Charline Bourgeois-Tacquet
- Written by: Charline Bourgeois-Tacquet
- Produced by: Igor Auzépy; Stéphane Demoustier; Philippe Martin; David Thion
- Starring: Anaïs Demoustier; Valeria Bruni Tedeschi; Denis Podalydès
- Cinematography: Noé Bach
- Edited by: Chantal Hymans
- Music by: Nicola Piovani
- Production companies: Année Zéro; Les Films Pelléas; Arte France Cinéma
- Distributed by: Haut et Court
- Release date: 10 July 2021 (Cannes)
- Running time: 98 minutes
- Country: France
- Languages: French; English
- Budget: €3 million
- Box office: $467,620

Anaïs in Love (French: Les Amours d'Anaïs) is a 2021 French film written and directed by Charline Bourgeois-Tacquet. Starring Anaïs Demoustier as the titular role, it follows a young woman who falls in love with a middle aged woman.

The film had its world premiere in the Critics' Week section of the 2021 Cannes Film Festival on 10 July 2021. It was theatrically released in France on 15 September by Haut et Court.

== Plot ==
Anaïs, a woman in her mid-thirties living in Paris, is feeling lost and unsure of what to do with her life. She has a tempestuous relationship with her boyfriend Raoul, and they fight and make up often. She decides to live in her expensive apartment alone. Anaïs is also procrastinating on completing her doctoral thesis on passion in the 17th century. At a party, she meets Daniel, an older publisher, who falls in love with her. Anaïs tells Raoul that she is pregnant but plans to have an abortion and leave him because she feels a lack of passion in their relationship.

When Anaïs learns that her mother has cancer, her restlessness increases. She delays meeting with her thesis supervisor and avoids paying her rent. She begins a half-hearted affair with Daniel, who confesses that he does not want to leave his partner Emilie, a well-known writer. Anaïs becomes fascinated with Emilie after seeing a photograph of her and starts reading her works. She eventually meets Emilie by chance and expresses her admiration. From there, Anaïs tries to get closer to Emilie despite the obstacles, and their desire for each other reaches a climax when they stay together at a writer's retreat.

== Cast ==
- Anaïs Demoustier as Anaïs
- Valeria Bruni Tedeschi as Emilie
- Denis Podalydès as Daniel
- Jean-Charles Clichet as Yoann
- Christophe Montenez as Raoul
- Annie Mercier as Odile

== Production ==
The film was shot on the Brittany peninsula and in the city of Nantes in France.

== Critical reception ==
On review aggregator website Rotten Tomatoes, 90% of 69 reviews are positive, with an average rating of 6.7/10. The site's critics' consensus reads: "The main character may be hard to like, but Anaïs in Love offers a well-acted and breezily humorous take on its admittedly well-worn themes." On Metacritic, the film has a weighted average score of 73 out of 100, based on 18 critics, indicating "generally favorable reviews".

The film was a New York Times Critic's Pick. Manohla Dargis wrote that the movie seems straightforward, looking "clear and bright", and moving "as briskly as its protagonist, with the editing and lively music doing more conspicuous work than the discreet cinematography." In a review for The Wrap, Katie Walsh wrote the style is as breathless and entertaining as the film's protagonist." In a positive review for Indiewire David Ehrlich wrote "If anything, Bourgeois-Tacquet's debut comes off as a deliberate effort to wrench a proud Gallic tradition—manically effervescent movies about motor-mouthed young neurotics—away from the foreign cineastes who've co-opted it for the 21st century, and return it to home soil where it might reconnect with its roots."
