= Matthieu Boujenah =

French comedian (born 1976)

- Born: 23 June 1976 (age 49); Bagneux, Paris, France
- Occupations: Actor; comedian

Matthieu Boujenah (born 23 June 1976) is a French comedian and actor. He is the nephew of Michel Boujenah and Paul Boujenah. His sister is actress Lucie Boujenah.

== Selected filmography ==
=== Film ===
List of film appearances, with year, title, and role shown
| Year | Title | Role | Notes |
|---|---|---|---|
| 2002 | Summer Things | Romain | |
| 2003 | Father and Sons | Julien | Directed by Michel Boujenah |
| 2005 | Marock | Youri Benchetrit | |
| 2009 | Knife Edge | Henri Connaught | |
| 2009 | Tellement proches | Old Lucien | |
| 2012 | What the Day Owes the Night | André (Dédé) | |
| 2013 | Angélique | Marquis d'Andijos | |
| 2014 | 24 Days | Johan | His sister, Lucie Boujenah, also appears |

=== Television ===
List of television appearances, with year, title, and role shown
| Year | Title | Role | Notes |
|---|---|---|---|
| 2000 | Julie Lescaut | Joseph | 1 episode |
| 2002 | La vie devant nous | Vincent | 3 episodes |
| 2007 | Section de recherches | Michel Véga | 1 episode |
| 2010–12 | La Nouvelle Maud | Yoyo Mercier | 12 episodes |
| 2011 | Clem | Luc | 1 episode |
