= Soda (TV series) =

French television series

- Genre: Shortcom; Comedy
- Created by: Frank Bellocq; David Soussan; Kev Adams; Cyril Cohen
- Starring: Kev Adams; Guy Lecluyse; Laurence Oltuski; William Lebghil; GGaël Cottat; Lucie Boujenah; Louise Blachère; Syrielle Mejias; Alika Del Sol
- Country of origin: France
- Original language: French

Production
- Producers: Jean-Yves Robin; Elisa Soussan

Soda is a French television shortcom consisting of 690 episodes of two- to three-minute-long snippets, produced by Frank Bellocq, David Soussan, Kev Adams, and Cyril Cohen, which premiered on M6 on 4 July 2011 and on W9 on 5 May 2012.

The series follows Adam, an 18-year-old high school student, as he struggles with amusing yet realistic everyday issues.

== Premise ==
Adam, a teenager with a reputation for being a lost cause, tries to find the best means to make girls fall for him—especially his crush, Jenna. His younger sister, Ève (nicknamed Chucky), never stops annoying him, and vice versa.

The title, Soda, is the anagram of the word “ados”, "teenager", in French.

== Production ==
An episode lasts twenty-four minutes, each divided into sequences of three minutes and a half.

The shooting takes place in Bry-Sur-Marne.

== Cast and characters ==
=== Main ===
- Kev Adams as Adam Fontella
- Guy Lecluyse as Michel Fontella, Adam's dad
- Laurence Oltuski as Élisabeth (Babeth) Fontella, Adam's mom
- Syrielle Mejias as Ève (Chucky) Fontella, Adam's little sister
- William Lebghil as Slimane (Slim) Elboughi, Adam's friend
- Gaël Cottat as Ludovic (Ludo) Drancourt, Adam's friend
- Jéromine Chasseriaud as Adam's girlfriend (starting from season 3)
- Lucie Boujenah as Jenna Malaurie, Adam's love interest
- Louise Blachère as Stéphanie (le Cafard) Bouvier, Jenna's friend, who is crazy in love with Slimane (Slimane's girlfriend starting in season 3)

=== Recurring ===
- Dominique Frot as Solange Vergneaux, High-school principal/headteacher
- Alika Del Sol as Malika Elboughi, Slimane's mother and Babath's friend
- Frank Bellocq as Patrick, High-school monitor (seasons 2 and 3)
- Chantal Garrigues as Gisèle Favrot, Babeth's mother and Adam and Ève's grandmother
- John Eledjam as Uskur, Liberty kebab shop manager and Adam's boss
- Gaël Mectoob as Pascal, High-school cafeteria cook
- Alex Lutz as Thierry, ex-high-school monitor (seasons 1 and 2)

== Season 1 ==
The first season, broadcast on M6, has 244 episodes.

Adam is a normal teenager who lives a quiet life in high school (although he never gets good grades) and has two friends, Slimane and Ludovic. He is in love with the most beautiful girl in school, Jenna, who doesn't reciprocate his feelings. He is the oldest child in a middle-class family. His father, Michel, works in a bank and his mother Elizabeth (a.k.a. Babeth) is a beautician who has her own home business (her only regular customer is Malika, Slimane's mother). Adam dreams of living in the US and thinks this dream will fall straight into his lap, so he does whatever he wants, such as not doing any work in class, playing video games, and playing pranks on the high school supervisors (Thierry and Patrick). However, circumstances compromise his American Dream: his parents are strict, his sister plays tricks on him, and the school principal, Ms. Vergneaux, repeatedly puts him in detention.

== Season 2 ==
The second season, broadcast on W9, has 249 episodes.

Adam is in his final year of high school. He hasn't studied for his bac, however. The Fontella family has to put up with the more frequent presence of Babeth's mother, Gisèle, to Michel's utter despair, as he cannot stand his mother-in-law anymore. Ève begins showing some interest in Ludovic, Adam's friend, but this latter is not interested in the girl's love and only cares about his schoolwork or Adam's jokes, which are, most of the time, directed at him. Slimane has a hard time getting rid of Stephanie, Jenna's best friend, who is constantly tagging along, hoping he will fall for her.

== Season 3 ==
The third season, broadcast on W9 on 7 September 2013, has 300 episodes.

The season marks Jenna's departure as her father is transferred to Africa for business. Adam works part-time in a kebab shop, Slimane is starting to show some affection for Stephanie, though he previously seemed to hate her. Adam is dating Juliette, his after-school teacher.

== Season 4 ==
In June 2014, Kev Adams announced on Europe 1 that a fourth season would come out in December 2014. This plan was scrapped, however, as the show was canceled.
