= Jean-Charles Tacchella =

French screenwriter and film director (1925–2024)

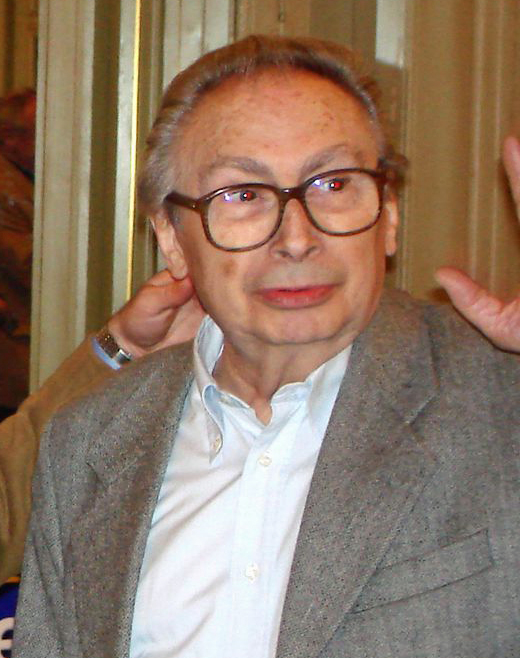
- Tacchella in 2005
- Born: 23 September 1925; Cherbourg, Manche, Normandy, France
- Died: 29 August 2024 (aged 98); Versailles, Yvelines, France
- Occupations: Film director, screenwriter, cinematographer
- Years active: 1955–2010

Jean-Charles Tacchella (23 September 1925 – 29 August 2024) was a French screenwriter and film director. He was nominated for an Academy Award for Best Original Screenplay for his film Cousin Cousine (1975), which was also nominated for the Academy Award for Best Foreign Language Film and which was later remade in the U.S. as Cousins (1989) starring Ted Danson, Isabella Rossellini, Sean Young and William Petersen.

== Early career ==
Jean-Charles Tacchella was born on 23 September 1925 in Cherbourg, Manche. He had Genoese ancestry. He studied in Marseille and, just after the liberation of France, left for Paris with the aim of becoming a film director. He joined L'Écran français when he was nineteen, where he worked with Jean Renoir, Becker, and Grémillon. While with the magazine, he wrote about filmmakers, actors, films and met André Bazin, Nino Frank, Roger Leenhardt, Roger Thérond, and Alexandre Astruc. He became friends with Erich Von Stroheim, Anna Magnani, Vittorio de Sica and created the monthly “Ciné Digest” with Henri Colpi. In 1948, Tacchella, along with Bazin, Jacques Doniol-Valcroze, Astruc, Claude Mauriac, René Clément, and Pierre Kast, established Objectif 49, an avant-garde film club whose president was Jean Cocteau. Objectif 49 became the birthplace of the New Wave cinema.

== Film director ==
Jean-Charles Tacchella directed eleven features, many of which have had successful international careers and been awarded prestigious prizes. They include Voyage to Grand Tartarie (1974), Cousin cousine (1975, nominated for the Oscars Césars, Silver Shell for Best Director at the 1976 San Sebastian International Film Festival), Le Pays bleu (1977), It's a Long Time I've Loved You (1979, Jury Prize at the Montreal Film Festival), Croque la vie (1981), Staircase C (1985, Prix de l'Académie française, Grand Prix at the Uppsala Film Festival), Travelling avant (1987, Best Male Newcomer for Thierry Frémont – Golden Tulip for Best Director at the Istanbul Film Festival), Gallant Ladies (Best Director, Digne Film Festival 1990), The Man of My Life (1992), and Seven Sundays (1995).

Tacchella was described as being "a smooth technician, Tacchella's camera work is fluid and precise". His movie Traveling avant (1987) is described as "a semi-autobiographical paean to his youth as a cinema fanatic and cine-club enthusiast in post-war Paris".

== Cinémathèque ==
Tacchella was President of the Cinémathèque Française from 2000 to 2003.

== Death ==
Tacchella died in Versailles, Yvelines on 29 August 2024, at the age of 98.

== Selected filmography ==
Year	Title	Director	Writer	Producer
1955	The Heroes Are Tired	No	Yes	No
1957	Typhoon over Nagasaki	No	Yes	No
1958	The Law Is the Law	No	Yes	No
1959	Come Dance with Me	No	Yes	No
1959	Time Bomb (Le vent se lève)	No	Yes	No
1959	Croquemitoufle	No	Yes	No
1960	The Itchy Palm	No	Yes	No
1961	The Honors of War	No	Yes	No
1962	Crime Does Not Pay	No	Yes	No
1964	The Thief of Tibadabo	No	Yes	No
1964	The Great Blow	No	Yes	No
1966	La longue marche	No	Yes	No
1971	Legs in the Air	No	Yes	No
1971	The Last Winters (short)	Yes	Yes	No
1973	Une belle journée (short)	Yes	Yes	No
1974	Voyage to Grand Tartarie	Yes	Yes	No
1975	Cousin Cousine	Yes	Yes	No
1978	Blue Country	Yes	Yes	No
1979	Silver Anniversary (Il y a longtemps que je t'aime)	Yes	Yes	No
1981	Croque la vie	Yes	Yes	No
1985	Escalier C	Yes	Yes	No
1987	Travelling avant	Yes	Yes	No
1990	Gallant Ladies	Yes	Yes	No
1992	The Man of My Life	Yes	Yes	No
1994	Seven Sundays	Yes	Yes	No
1999	Les Gens qui s'aiment	Yes	Yes	No
