= The Bait (1995 film) =

1995 French crime film

- Theatrical release poster
- French: L'Appât
- Directed by: Bertrand Tavernier
- Written by: Bertrand Tavernier; Colo Tavernier O'Hagan
- Produced by: Frédéric Bourboulon; René Cleitman
- Starring: Marie Gillain; Olivier Sitruk; Bruno Putzulu
- Cinematography: Alain Choquart
- Edited by: Luce Grunenwaldt
- Music by: Philippe Haïm
- Production companies: Hachette Première; Little Bear Productions; France 2 Cinéma; M6 Films
- Distributed by: BAC Films
- Release date: 8 March 1995
- Running time: 115 minutes
- Country: France
- Language: French
- Budget: $5.3 million
- Box office: $5.8 million

The Bait (French: L'Appât), also known as Fresh Bait, is a 1995 French film directed by Bertrand Tavernier about two boys and a girl who commit a murder, with the girl acting as the "bait".

The film is based on the 1990 book of the same name by Morgan Sportès, which is in turn based on the "Valérie Subra affair", a true event that happened in 1984.

== Cast ==
- Marie Gillain – Nathalie
- Olivier Sitruk – Eric
- Bruno Putzulu – Bruno
- Richard Berry – Alain
- Philippe Duclos – Antoine
- Marie Ravel – Karine
- Clotilde Courau – Patricia
- Christophe Odent – Laurent
- Jean-Paul Comart – Michel
- Philippe Héliès – Pierre
- Jacky Nercessian – Monsieur Tapiro
- Alain Sarde – Philippe
- Daniel Russo – Jean-Pierre
- Philippe Torreton – Chief inspector
- François Berléand – Inspector Durieux
- Isabelle Sadoyan – Eric's grandmother
- François Levantal – Cop
- Jean-Louis Richard – The innkeeper

== Awards ==
The film won the Golden Bear Award at the 45th Berlin International Film Festival.

Gillain was nominated for the César Award for Most Promising Actress.
