= La Soupe aux choux =

- Directed by: Jean Girault
- Screenplay by: Louis de Funès; Jean Halain
- Based on: La Soupe aux choux by René Fallet
- Produced by: Christian Fechner
- Starring: Louis de Funès; Jean Carmet; Jacques Villeret; Claude Gensac; Henri Génès; Max Montavon; Marco Perrin; Christine Dejoux
- Narrated by: Jean-Pierre Rambal
- Cinematography: Edmond Richard
- Edited by: Michel Lewin
- Music by: Raymond Lefèvre
- Production companies: Films Christian Fechner; Films A2
- Distributed by: AMLF
- Release date: 2 December 1981 (France)
- Running time: 98 minutes
- Country: France
- Language: French
- Box office: $23.2 million

La Soupe aux choux (French pronunciation: [la sup o ʃu], lit. 'Cabbage Soup') is a 1981 French science fiction comedy-drama film directed by Jean Girault, based on the 1980 novel by René Fallet. It was the second to last movie made by French comedian Louis de Funès.

== Plot ==
Claude Ratinier (Louis de Funès), known as Le Glaude, is an old man who lives on a small farm across the road from his long-time friend Francis Chérasse (Jean Carmet), known as Le Bombé. The two are described as the last surviving members of their breed, still living in a rural fashion while the rest of the world has modernized. They spend their days getting drunk and eating cabbage soup, while they spend their nights getting drunk and farting.

One night, their farting summons an alien (Jacques Villeret) from the planet Oxo while Le Bombé is asleep. Le Glaude is awake to welcome the alien, who can only communicate in a squealing-siren sound at first. Surprised, Le Glaude communicates with the alien through rough sign language and then sends him off with a canister full of cabbage soup. Le Bombé has seen the flying saucer too, but Le Glaude tells him that there was no such thing. He goes to the police but is dismissed as a loony. When Le Bombé realizes that no one believes him, he contemplates suicide. Worried about his friend, Le Glaude tricks him into hanging himself while he secretly cuts the rope so that he falls when he puts his weight on it.

The alien returns several times for more cabbage soup, since his species' staple diet on Oxo consists of minerals and the soup has introduced a new and delicious variety. On the second meeting, the alien has learned French in order to communicate properly with Le Glaude. He arranges to have Le Glaude's late wife resurrected at the age of 20, but she runs away to Paris with a young man within a day of her resurrection. The alien also duplicates Le Glaude's gold coin hundreds of times, making Glaude rich. Finally, because of the effect of the delicious cabbage soup on Oxo, the alien offers Le Glaude, Le Bombé and their cat a residence on Oxo so that they can grow their cabbage, make cabbage soup, and live to an age of 200 like all Oxonians. Glaude initially rejects the proposition outright.

Meanwhile, the mayor of the rural town decides to modernize and plans a new housing project directly on the old men's land. Although he threatens to put them in a cage like monkeys, he cannot convince them to give up their land. He decides to simply build around their houses and fence them off from the rest of the neighborhood. They become a thing of ridicule, with people jeering at them and throwing popcorn at them whenever they step outside of their doors.

This sad destruction of their peaceful home convinces Le Glaude to accept the alien's offer. He tells Le Bombé about their option, who is at first unconvinced, but opens up to the idea when he sees the communicator the alien has left. Le Glaude makes a last stop at the post office to send his wife a package containing the gold he was given by the alien, and then calls his Oxonian friend, whose spaceships ferry Le Glaude, Le Bombé, and their farms off to his planet.

== Cast ==
- Louis de Funès as Claude Ratinier, aka "Le Glaude"
- Jean Carmet as Francis Chérasse, aka "Le Bombé" or "Cicisse"
- Jacques Villeret as the alien, aka "La Denrée"
- Claude Gensac as Amélie Poulangeard
- Henri Génès as the Maréchal des Logis-Chef
- Max Montavon as Amélie's brother
- Marco Perrin as the mayor
- Christine Dejoux as Francine
- Gaëlle Legrand as Catherine Lamouette
- Philippe Ruggieri as Robert
- Perrette Souplex as Aimée
- Catherine Ohotnikoff as the restaurant owner
- Philippe Brizard as Guillaume
- Thierry Liagre as the doctor
- Carole Nugue as the clothes seller

== Theme song ==
The theme song became popular in France, and has been remixed many times. Artist Fat Dog created a mix with Mr. Cosmic dubbed "I'm not scoobidoobidoo".
