= Chantal Garrigues =

French actress (1944–2018)

- Born: 14 November 1944; Montpellier, France
- Died: 29 June 2018 (aged 73)
- Occupation: Actress

Chantal Garrigues (14 November 1944 – 29 June 2018) was a French actress. Over the course of her career, she appeared in a dozen films. She was also a stage and television actress, and she played Gisèle Favrot in Soda.

== Early life ==
Garrigues was born 14 November 1944 in Montpellier.

== Career ==
Garrigues began her career in the theatre, where she appeared in plays by Molière, Feydeau and Chekhov. She played in her first film in 1984. Over the course of her career, she appeared in a dozen films, including Female Agents in 2008 and Boule et Bill 2 in 2017.

Garrigues appeared on television series like Joséphine Ange Gardien, Avocats et Associés and Boulevard du Palais. She also played Gisèle Favrot on Soda.

== Death ==
Garrigues died on 29 June 2018.
