= Charline Bourgeois-Tacquet =

French filmmaker and actress (born 1986)

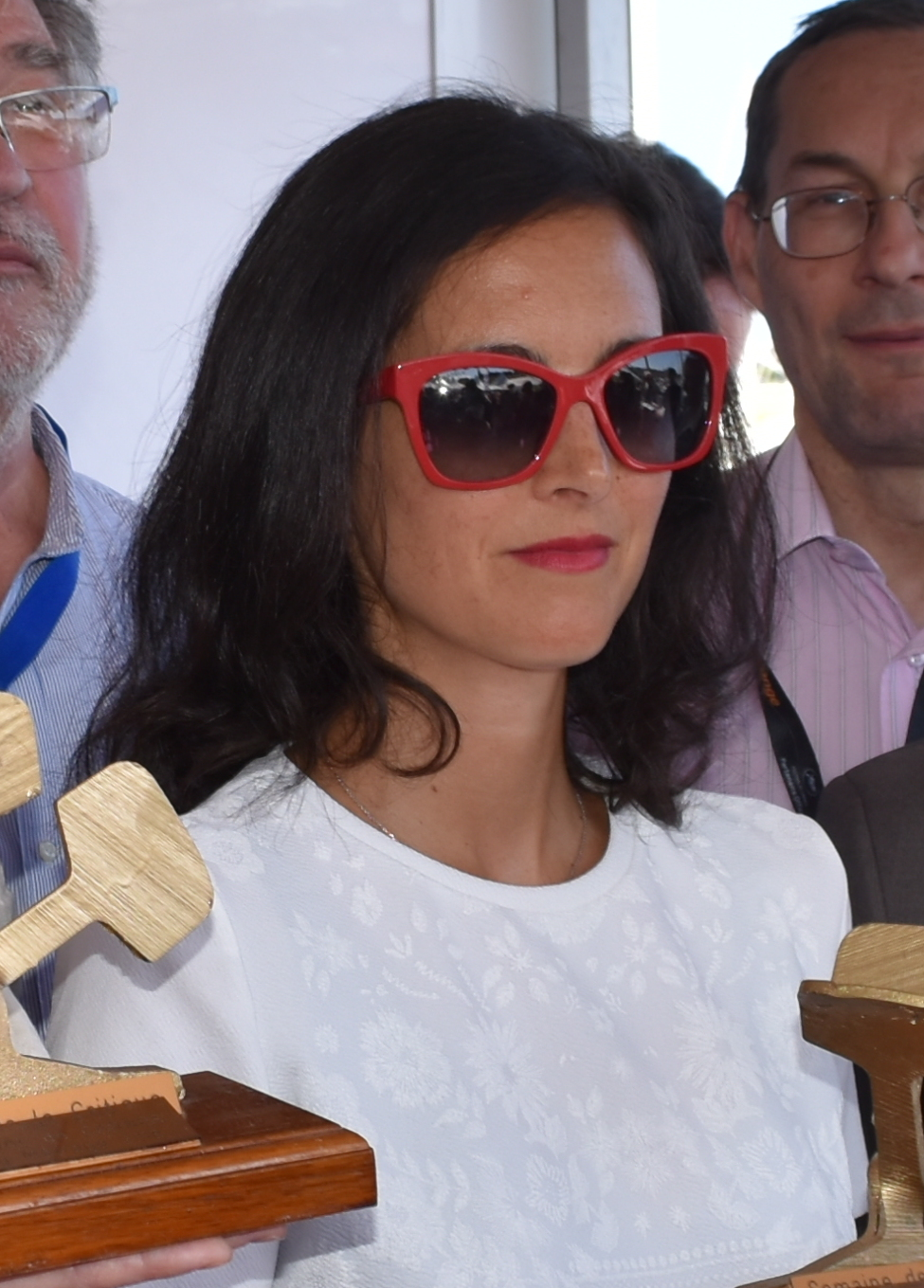
- Bourgeois-Tacquet at the 2018 Cannes Film Festival
- Born: 1986 (age 39–40); Royan, France
- Education: Sorbonne University
- Occupations: Director; screenwriter; actress
- Years active: 2014–present
- Partner: Emmanuel Carrère

Charline Bourgeois-Tacquet (French pronunciation: [ʃaʁ.lin buʁ.ʒwa ta.kɛ]; born 1986) is a French director, screenwriter, and actress.

== Early life ==
Bourgeois-Tacquet was born and raised in Royan; her mother taught English and her father was a furniture importer. She became interested in acting at the age of 14 after seeing Isabelle Huppert in the play Medea in La Rochelle.

She attended the Lycée Cordouan in Royan and later moved to Paris to enroll in the khâgne program at the Lycée Fénelon. She then earned a licence de lettres and a master's degree in literature from Sorbonne University. After failing the agrégation de lettres exam to teach literature, she applied for an internship at the publishing house Éditions Grasset, from where she was later offered a full-time position.

== Career ==
Bourgeois-Tacquet began her career working as an editorial assistant at Éditions Grasset for three years. Through her work connections, she secured small roles in films by Lucas Belvaux, Philippe Le Guay, and Mia Hansen-Løve. At the age of 25, she met producer Philippe Carcassonne and sent him two screenplays, one of which became her first short film, Joujou. Her second short film, Pauline, Enslaved, was screened in the Critics' Week section of the 2018 Cannes Film Festival.

Principal photography on her debut feature film, Anaïs in Love, took place in 2020. The film was partly inspired by an affair she had with a married man, and was screened out of competition in the Critics' Week section of the 2021 Cannes Film Festival. Her second feature film, A Woman's Life, premiered in the main competition of the 2026 Cannes Film Festival.

== Personal life ==
Bourgeois-Tacquet's partner is French writer Emmanuel Carrère.

== Filmography ==
=== As filmmaker ===
Year	Title	Director	Writer	Notes	Ref.
2016	Joujou	Yes	Yes	Short film	
2018	Pauline, Enslaved	Yes	Yes	Short film	
2021	Anaïs in Love	Yes	Yes		
2026	A Woman's Life	Yes	Yes		

=== As actress ===
Year	Title	Role	Notes	Ref.
2014	Not My Type	Woman in the Cinémathèque		
2015	Qui c'est les plus forts?	Nurse		
2015	Floride	Saleswoman		
2016	Things to Come	Department manager at Éditions Cartet		
2016	Joujou	Pauline	Short film	
2021	Between Two Worlds	Charline		
2024	Suspended Time	Journalist		

== Awards and nominations ==
Award	Year	Category	Nominated work	Result	Ref.
Cannes Film Festival	2018	Canal+ Award for Short Film	Pauline, Enslaved	Nominated	
Cannes Film Festival	2021	Caméra d'Or	Anaïs in Love	Nominated	
Cannes Film Festival	2021	Queer Palm	Anaïs in Love	Nominated	
Cannes Film Festival	2026	Palme d'Or	A Woman's Life	Nominated	
Cinema Jove	2019	Luna de Valencia for Best Short Film	Pauline, Enslaved	Nominated	
Clermont-Ferrand International Short Film Festival	2019	National Competition: Special Mention	Pauline, Enslaved	Won	
Glasgow Film Festival	2022	Audience Award	Anaïs in Love	Nominated	
Melbourne Queer Film Festival	2021	Jury Award for Best First Feature Narrative	Anaïs in Love	Won	
Miami Film Festival	2022	Jordan Ressler First Feature Award	Anaïs in Love	Nominated	
