= Michel Boujenah =

French-Tunisian actor and director (born 1952)

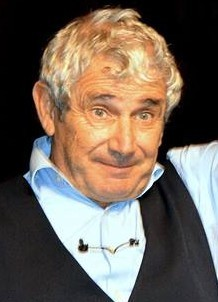
- Boujenah in 2017
- Born: 3 November 1952 (age 74); Tunis, Tunisia
- Occupations: Actor; comedian; film director; screenwriter
- Years active: 1980–present
- Website: michelboujenah.com

Michel Boujenah (born 3 November 1952) is a French-Tunisian Jewish actor, comedian, film director, and screenwriter.

== Life and career ==
Michel Boujenah was born on 3 November 1952 in Tunis, Tunisia. He is the brother of Paul Boujenah, a film director, and the uncle of actors Matthieu Boujenah and Lucie Boujenah.

He came to live in France in 1963, his family having chosen to leave Tunisia, where the situation had become difficult for Jews following independence. He then grew up in Bagneux, south of Paris.

A poor student, Boujenah said he endured discrimination at school, where he was bullied either as a Jew or as an Arab. A class presentation helped him develop a taste for public speaking. After graduating, he applied for acting school but was turned down because of his accent. He then decided to learn acting on his own, by teaching drama classes to children.

Boujenah became popular in France during the 1980s as a stand-up comedian, with humor that drew heavily from his own background as a Tunisian Jew. His first successful one-man show, Les Magnifiques (1984), was a satirical depiction of that community's immigration to France during the 1960s.

He has appeared in over thirty films as well as in a variety of television productions. His notable films include Three Men and a Cradle (1985, remade in the United States as Three Men and a Baby) and La Totale! (1991, remade as True Lies). In 1993, he appeared in the film Le Nombril du monde, which earned him a nomination for the César Award for Best Actor. He has also directed the films Father and Sons (2003), Trois amis (2007), and Heartstrings (2016).

=== Controversy ===
In 2017, Boujenah's invitation to perform in Tunisia at the Carthage Theatre Festival was protested by activists involved in the Boycott, Divestment and Sanctions movement against Israel. While Boujenah is not Israeli, he has spoken positively about Israel and said "I feel Jewish, French, Tunisian, Zionist and very close to Israel, as well as a supporter of a Palestinian state". The Tunisian Association for the Support of Minorities defended Boujenah and accused boycott promoters of antisemitism. Boujenah clarified that he was merely "a clown" whose profession did not involve addressing political issues, and that he wished to support Tunisia's transition to democracy rather than import the Israeli-Palestinian conflict. His show eventually went ahead and played to a full house.

== Selected filmography ==
Actor
Year	Title	Role	Notes
1985	Three Men and a Cradle	Michel	
1985	Slices of Life	Michel Lambert	
1985	Les Cinq Dernières Minutes	Luc Henno	Television series – 1 episode
1986	The Last Image	Simon Attal	
1991	La Totale!	Simon/Marcel	
1993	Le Nombril du Monde	Bajou	
1995	Les Misérables	André Ziman	
1996	A Summer in La Goulette	TSF	
1997	XXL	Alain Berrebi	
1998	Don Juan	Sganarelle	
2003	Father and Sons		voice
2003	The Car Keys	himself	cameo
2009	Ultimatum	Victor	
2012	Cendrillon au Far West	Petite Fumée	voice
2017	Scènes de ménages	Bernard	Television series – 1 episode
2024	Finalement	Michel	

Director

- Father and Sons (2003)
- Trois amis (2007)
- Heartstrings (2016)

== Awards and nominations ==
- 1985 – won the César Award for Best Supporting Actor for Three Men and a Cradle
- 1994 – nominated for the César Award for Best Actor for Le Nombril du Monde
- 2004 – nominated for the César Award for Best Debut for Father and Sons

== Honours ==
- Monaco : Officer of the Order of Cultural Merit (2004)
