= Marie Gillain =

Belgian actress (born 1975)

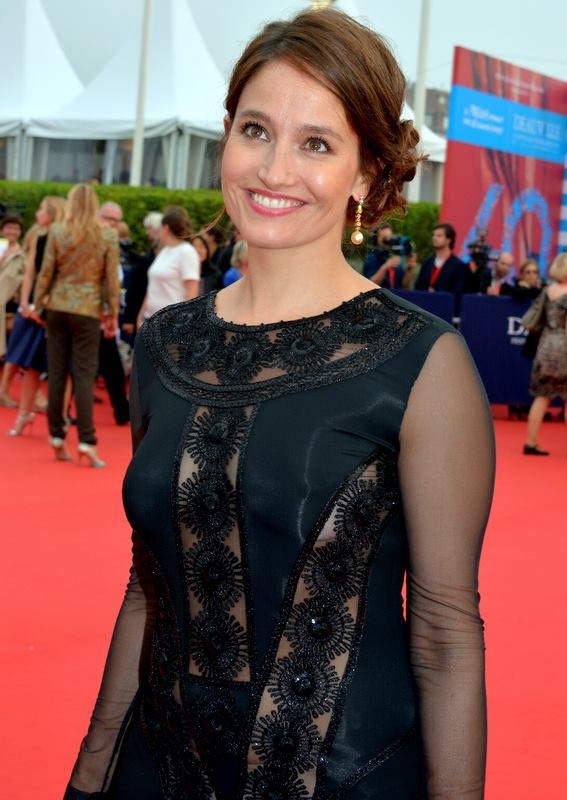
- Gillain at the 2014 Deauville American Film Festival
- Born: 18 June 1975 (age 51); Rocourt, Liège, Belgium
- Occupation: Actress
- Years active: 1991–present

Marie Gillain O.M.W. (French pronunciation: [maʁi ʒilɛ̃]; born 18 June 1975) is a Belgian actress. She was nominated four times at the César Awards and three times at the Molière Awards.

== Personal life ==
Gillain has two children: Dune, born in 2004 from a union with her partner, the musician Martin Gamet, and Vega, born in 2009 from her union with her partner at that time, the Franco-Italian actor Christophe d'Esposti.

== In popular culture ==
- She was the heroine of the John Malkovich play Hysteria in Chicago in December 1999.
- She is a model for cosmetics brand Lancôme.
- In 2013 she was nominated for the Magritte Award for Best Actress.

== Selected filmography ==
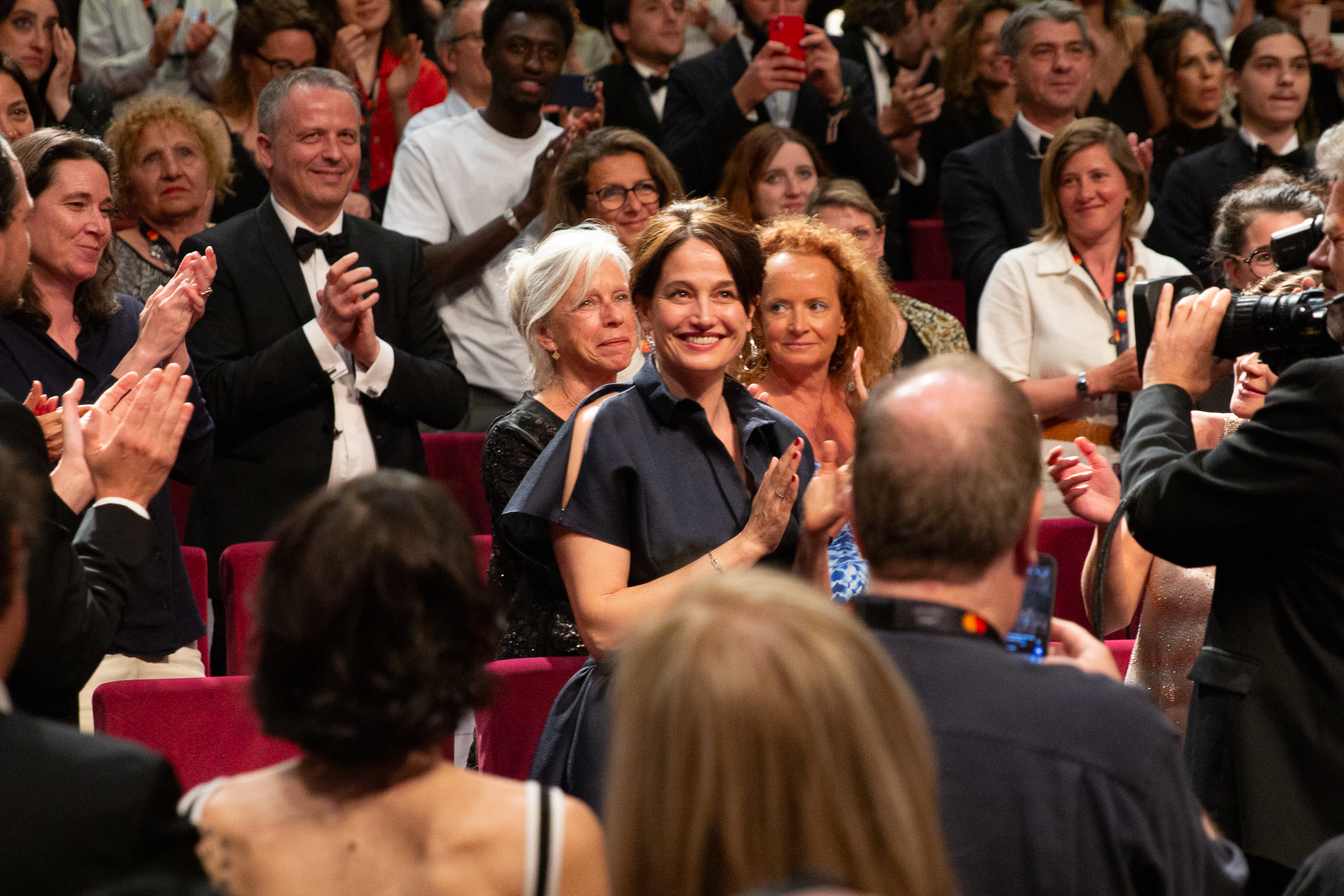
Gillain at the 2024 Cannes Film Festival premiere of Being Maria

- Mon père ce héros (1991) - Véronique a.k.a. My Father the Hero
- Un homme à la mer (TV) (1993) - Camille a.k.a. A Man at Sea
- Marie (1994) - Marie
- The Bait (L'appât) (1995) - Nathalie
- Le affinità elettive (1996) - Ottilia
- An Air So Pure (1997) - Julie d'Espard
- Le Bossu (1997) - Aurore
- La cena (1998) - Allieva a.k.a. The Dinner
- Harem Suare (1999) - Safiye
- Laissons Lucie faire! (2000) - Lucie
- Barnie et ses petites contrariétés (2001) - Margot a.k.a. Barnie's Minor Annoyances
- Absolument fabuleux (2001) - Safrane a.k.a. Absolutely Fabulous
- Laissez-passer (2002) – Olga a.k.a. Safe Conduct
- Not For, or Against (Quite the Contrary) (2003) – Caty
- Tout le plaisir est pour moi (2004) - Louise a.k.a. The Pleasure Is All Mine
- L'enfer (2005) - Anne a.k.a. Hell
- La voix de Laura (TV) (2005) - Laura
- Black Box (2006)
- Ma vie n'est pas une comédie romantique (2007)
- La clef (2007) - Audrey
- Les Femmes de l'Ombre (2008) - Suzy Desprez
- La très très grande entreprise (2008)
- Magique (2009)
- Coco Before Chanel (2009)
- The Little Prince (2010 TV series) (2010–2013) La Rose
- All Our Desires (2011)
- Landes (2013)
- Valentin Valentin (2015)
- Being Maria (2024)
