= Cinema of Vietnam =

- No. of screens: 901 (2019)

Produced feature films (2011)
- Fictional: 3
- Animated: 4
- Documentary: 28

Number of admissions (2011)
- Total: 13,500,000

Gross box office (2012)
- Total: $43 million

The cinema of Vietnam originates in the 1920s.

Some acclaimed Vietnamese language films include Cyclo, The Scent of Green Papaya and Vertical Ray of the Sun, all by Trần Anh Hùng, whose work challenged the war-torn depiction of Vietnam at the time. In more recent years, as Vietnam's film industry has modernized and moved beyond government-backed propaganda films, contemporary Vietnamese filmmakers have gained a wider audience with films such as Buffalo Boy, Bar Girls and The White Silk Dress.

More recent works include Vietnamese-language drama film, Inside the Yellow Cocoon Shell, by Phạm Thiên Ân, which won the Caméra d'Or in 2023 for best first feature film at the 76th Cannes Film Festival (2023). In the same event, the French film, The Taste of Things by Trần Anh Hùng won Best Director at the 2023 Cannes Film Festival.

== History ==
In the 1920s, a group of Vietnamese intellectuals formed the Huong Ky Film Company in Hanoi. It produced documentaries on the funeral of Emperor Khải Định and the enthronement of Bảo Đại.

In 2007, Muoi (Muoi: the Legend of a Portrait), the first horror film in Vietnam after the Fall of Saigon (collaborated by Korean producers), also became the first rated film with an under-16 ban.

Inside the Yellow Cocoon Shell (Bên trong vỏ kén vàng) by Phạm Thiên Ân won the Caméra d'Or, for the best first feature film at the 76th Cannes Film Festival (2023). Similarly, The Taste of Things by Trần Anh Hùng won Best Director at the 2023 Cannes Film Festival. Cu Li Never Cries (Cu li không bao giờ khóc) directed by Phạm Ngọc Lân has also won the “Best First Feature” award at the Berlin International Film Festival 2024.

Red Rain is currently the highest-grossing Vietnamese movie, making over 700 billion ₫.
