= Benoît Delhomme =

French film cinematographer

- Born: 28 August 1961 (age 64); Paris, France
- Occupations: Cinematographer, film director
- Years active: 1983–present

Benoît Delhomme (born 28 August 1961) is a French film cinematographer and film director.

== Career ==
Delhomme graduated from the École nationale supérieure Louis-Lumière in 1982.

He was assistant cameraman on Jean de Florette and Manon des Sources (1986) before becoming director of photography on feature films in the early 1990s. His filmography includes The Scent of Green Papaya (1993), What Time Is It There? (2001), The Theory of Everything (2014) and At Eternity's Gate (2018). In addition, Delhomme directed two commercials for Dior ("The Atelier of Dreams" and "The Garden of Dreams").

In 2024, he made his directorial debut with Mothers' Instinct, an English-language remake of the French film of the same name.

== Filmography ==
=== Feature film ===
Year	Title	Director	Notes
1991	Le Syndrome de Peter Pan	Kaloust Andalian	
1992	Loin du Brésil	Tilly	
1993	The Scent of Green Papaya	Tran Anh Hung	
1993	Comment font les gens	Pascale Bailly	
1994	Grande Petite	Sophie Fillières	
1994	L'irrésolu	Jean-Pierre Ronssin	
1995	Circuit Carole	Emmanuelle Cuau	
1995	Cyclo	Tran Anh Hung	
1996	When the Cat's Away	Cédric Klapisch	
1996	Family Resemblances	Cédric Klapisch	
1997	Le Secret de Polichinelle	Franck Landron	
1997	Artemisia	Agnès Merlet	
1999	The Loss of Sexual Innocence	Mike Figgis	
1999	The Winslow Boy	David Mamet	
1999	With or Without You	Michael Winterbottom	
1999	Miss Julie	Mike Figgis	
2000	Sade	Benoît Jacquot	
2001	Mortel Transfert	Jean-Jacques Beineix	
2001	What Time Is It There?	Tsai Ming-liang	
2002	L'Idole	Samantha Lang	
2002	Adolphe	Benoît Jacquot	
2003	Rencontre avec le dragon	Hélène Angel	
2004	Podium	Yann Moix	
2004	The Merchant of Venice	Michael Radford	
2005	The Proposition	John Hillcoat	
2006	Breaking and Entering	Anthony Minghella	
2007	1408	Mikael Håfström	
2008	The Boy in the Striped Pyjamas	Mark Herman	
2010	Chatroom	Hideo Nakata	
2010	Shanghai	Mikael Håfström	
2011	The Son of No One	Dito Montiel	
2011	One Day	Lone Scherfig	
2011	Wilde Salomé	Al Pacino	With Robert Leacock, Denis Maloney, Richard Picano, Matt Steinauer and Jeremy Weiss
2012	Lawless	John Hillcoat	
2013	Salomé	Al Pacino	
2014	A Most Wanted Man	Anton Corbijn	
2014	The Theory of Everything	James Marsh	
2016	Free State of Jones	Gary Ross	
2018	At Eternity's Gate	Julian Schnabel	
2020	Minamata	Andrew Levitas	
2022	Beauty	Andrew Dosunmu	
2022	Lady Chatterley's Lover	Laure de Clermont-Tonnerre	
2024	Mothers' Instinct	Himself	

== Awards and nominations ==
Year	Award	Category	Title	Result
1997	César Awards	Best Cinematography	Artemisia	Nominated
2001	Chicago International Film Festival	Special Jury Prize	What Time Is It There?	Won
2005	Australian Academy of Cinema and Television Arts	Best Cinematography	The Proposition	Won
2005	American Film Institute	Best Cinematography	The Proposition	Won
2014	Satellite Awards	Best Cinematography	The Theory of Everything	Nominated
