= Marois =

Marois may refer to:

- Barbara Marois (1963-), American field hockey player
- Daniel Marois (1968-), Canadian ice hockey player
- Jean Marois (artist), Canadian painter and writer
- Jean-Pierre Marois, French film director and producer
- Mario Marois (1957-), Canadian ice hockey player
- Pauline Marois, (1949-), Canadian politician
- Prix Jacques Le Marois, French flat horse race
