= Marcel Rouff =

French food writer

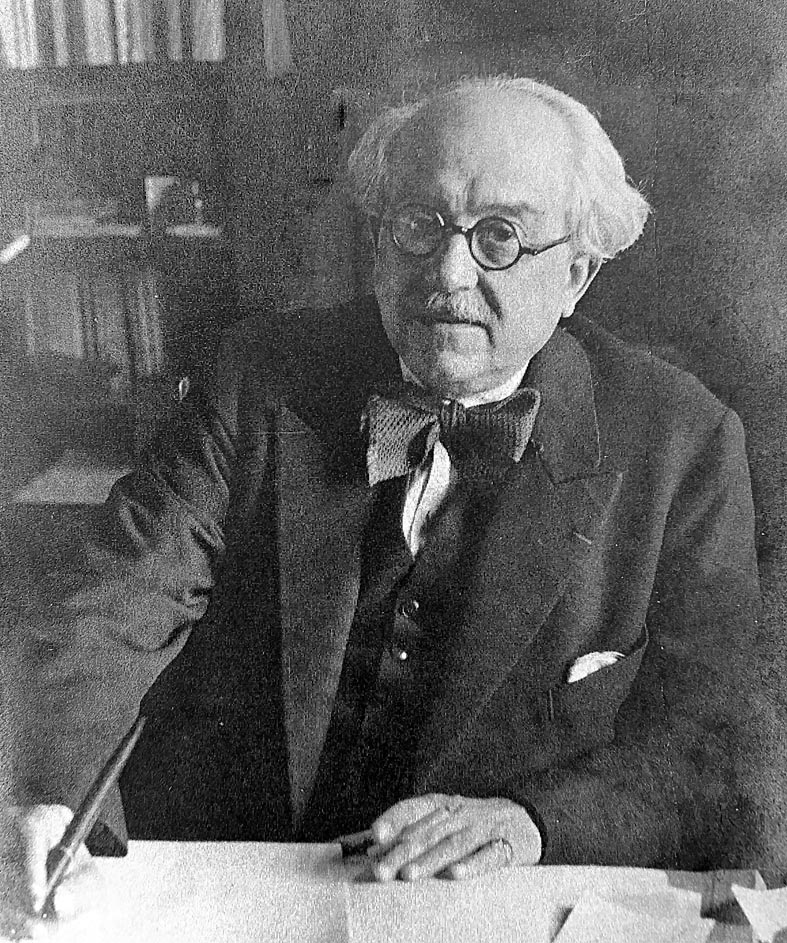
Marcel Rouff, was a novelist, poet, critic, and historian.

Marcel Rouff (May 4, 1877 in Carouge (Geneva) – February 3, 1936 in Paris) was a Swiss novelist, playwright, poet, journalist, historian, and gastronomic writer. With Curnonsky (Maurice Edmond Sailland) he wrote the multi-volume work La France gastronomique, guide des merveilles culinaires et des bonnes auberges françaises (Gastronomic France: Guide to the culinary marvels and the good inns of France). He may be best known today for his novel about the fictional gourmet Dodin-Bouffant, La vie et la passion de Dodin-Bouffant, Gourmet (The Life and Passion of Dodin-Bouffant, Gourmet also translated as The Passionate Epicure), which was first published in 1924 and dedicated to his friend Curnonsky and the great nineteenth-century French gastronome Jean-Anthelme Brillat-Savarin. Rouff's novel was adapted for French television in 1973 by Jean Ferniot and in a 2023 feature-length movie by Trần Anh Hùng, The Taste of Things.

Rouff had socialist leanings, which were apparent in his writings on social history. He was influenced by Jean Jaurès, and he contributed to Jaures's Histoire socialiste, which his father, Jules, published.

== Biography ==
Marcel Gabriel Rouff was born in Carouge, a suburb of Geneva, Switzerland on May 4, 1877. His father, Jules Rouff, was a well-known publisher; his mother was Camille Veil. The family moved to Paris when Marcel was an infant. He attended the Lycée Carnot and the Sorbonne, where he earned a Docteur-ès-lettres (effectively a PhD). In 1911, he married a French woman, Juliette Bloch-Tréfousse; they had two children, Nicole (1913) and Jean-Jacques (1916). Rouff retained his Swiss citizenship and also became a naturalized French citizen in 1930. He was a heavy pipe smoker and died of throat cancer on February 3, 1936 at the relatively young age of 57.

Rouff wrote novels, plays, and poetry, as well as non-fiction, including biography, history and journalism. He may be best known today for his gastronomic writing. He and his friend Curnonsky (Maurice Edmond Sailland) together wrote the 28-volume La France gastronomique: Guide des merveilles culinaires et des bonnes auberges françaises (Gastronomic France: Guide to the culinary marvels and the good inns of France) between 1921 and 1928. The series was an inventory of regional French specialties and restaurant recommendations, and included more than 5,000 recipes. The historian Julia Csergo writes that Curnonsky and Rouff "invented the 'gastronomic guide' with the publication of their Tour of Gastronomic France." Jean-Robert Pitte writes:

Of all the tourist guides appearing since the nineteenth century, this was the first to be expressly devoted to good regional dishes, good wines, and good restaurants. The influence of this work was immense. Henceforth, right beside Parisian haute cuisine, there would be a place of honor for the ultimate in regional cooking. Foreigners and the French never forgot it and would make eating well one of the driving forces of tourism in France.

Some consider Rouff's gastronomic novel, La vie et la passion de Dodin-Bouffant, gourmet (The Life and the Passion of Dodin-Bouffant, Gourmet), written before the First World War and published in 1924, to be his master work. French newspapers described the book variously as a "charming gastronomic fantasy" and "a small masterpiece." More recently, the literary scholar Lawrence R. Schehr called it "a hybrid work that sits somewhere between fiction and cookbooks, menus, and Food TV." The enduring popularity of Dodin-Bouffant' is clear, as it went through 50 French editions between 1924 and 2010. It was translated into English by "Claude" and was published in London in 1961 and the following year in New York. The English translation then went out of print until 2002.

Rouff was a founding member, with Curnonsky, of the Académie des gastronomes in 1928. Comœdia called Curnonsky and Rouff "twin brothers in literature in general and in gastronomy in particulier." Throughout 1924, Curnonsky and Rouff wrote and edited a special one-page section of Comœdia entitled "Le Beau Voyage et la Bonne Auberge," which appeared every Saturday and featured articles on gastronomy, regional cuisines, and tourism.

Rouff was made a Knight of the Legion of Honor (Chevalier de la Légion d'honneur), France's highest civilian honor, in 1921. Upon his death, Le Petit Journal praised him as "one of the princes of gastronomy."

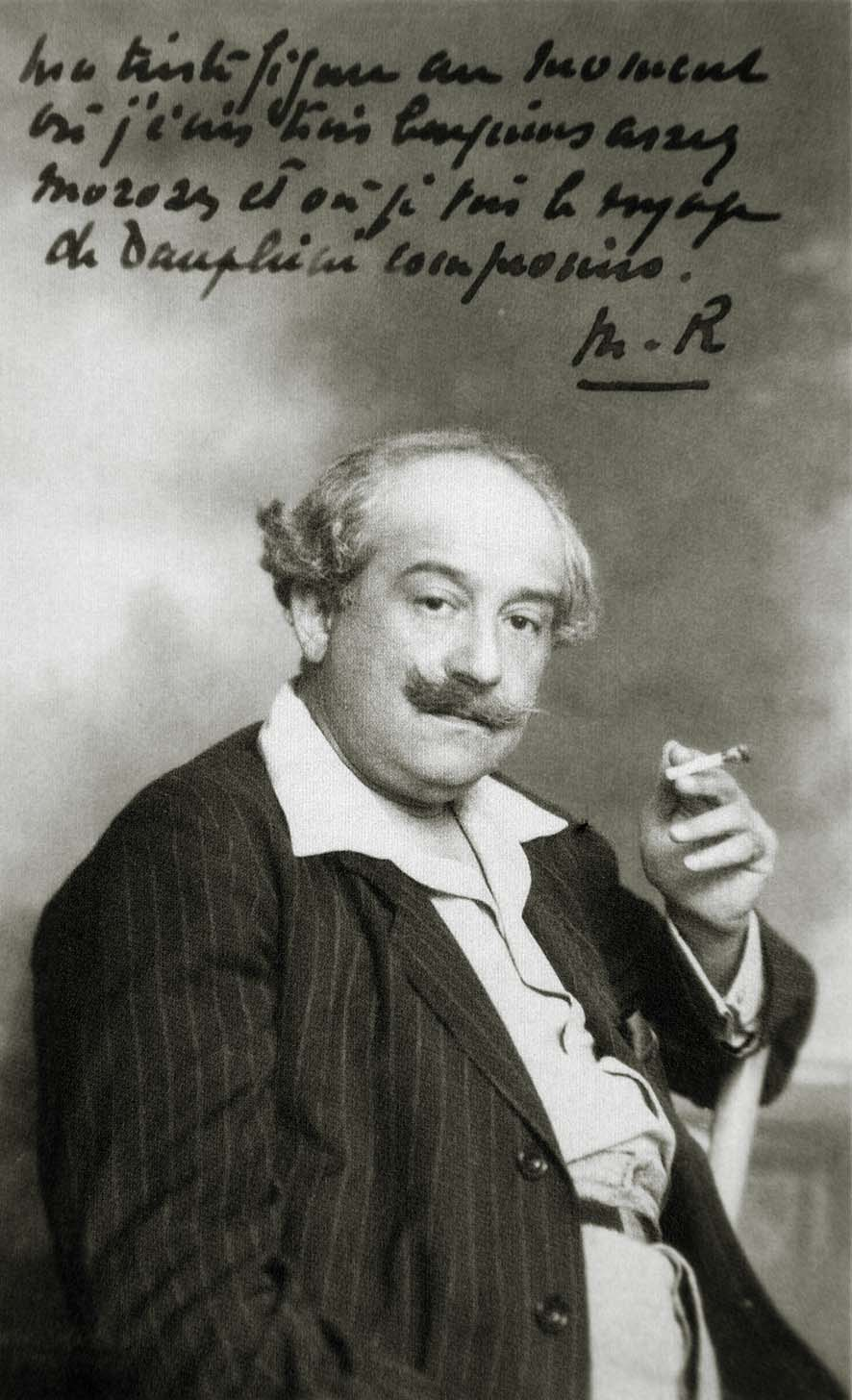
Marcel rouff triste figure

== Select bibliography ==
- Les hautaines (1896)
- Les Moulins à vent (1919)
- La Vie et la passion de Dodin-Bouffant, gourmet (1924)
- The Passionate Epicure: La Vie et la Passion de Dodin-Bouffant, Gourmet (2002), translated by Claude, with a preface by Lawrence Durrell and introduction by Jeffrey Steingarten.
- La France gastronomique, guide des merveilles culinaires et des bonnes auberges françaises, with Curnonsky (Maurice Edmond Sailland), 28 vols. (1921-1928)
- Les Mines de charbon en France au XVIIIe siècle, 1744-1791 (1922)
- Voyage au monde à l'envers (1923)
- Journey To The Inverted World (2011) (Voyage au Monde à l'Envers by Marcel Rouff (1923)) translated by Brian Stableford ISBN 978-1-61227-039-5
- Guinoiseau, ou le Moyen de ne pas parvenir (1926)
- Les Temps révolus. Sur le quai Wilson (1926)
- Brillat-Savarin (1926)
- Anaïs ou l'heure des élites (1928)
- La Vie de Chateaubriand (1929)
- L'homme de cinquante ans (1929)
- La vie de fête sous le second Empire (1930)
- La confession du Pacifique (1933)
- L'Eloge de Honoré de Balzac (1939)

Rouff also wrote for newspapers, including Tribune de Genève, Comoedia, Paris-Midi, Excelsior, Mercure de France, and La Revue du Touring-Club de France.
