= Tôn-Thất Tiết =

Vietnamese-born French music composer (born 1933)

Tôn-Thất Tiết (born 1933 in Huê) is a Vietnamese-born French music composer. His double-character family name is Tôn Thất, his given name Tiết (尊室節).

== Biography ==
Born in Huê in central Vietnam in 1933, Tiet came to Paris in 1958 to study composition at the Conservatoire de Paris. In 1977 he adopted French citizenship.

At the Paris Conservatoire he attended Jean Rivier's and André Jolivet's classes for composition. He was at first drawn to the serial technique but from 1966 on he turned to another mode of inspiration. Of André Jolivet he said: "As a professor, he has never tried to influence me, nor push me toward any special kind of style. Our professor-student relationship was of a spiritual order. Yet through his suggestion and what Rivier had said, I came to realize that it was in the oriental way of thinking that I would find my style in music. I owe to Rivier the language and the shaping of my music which, as Jolivet has said, should be "a mean to express ideas and not an aim in itself".

Tôn-Thất Tiết's music has a special language in which both oriental and occidental trends are fused, although the inspiration and thoughts are drawn basically from oriental sources. This is obvious in many of his works such as Kiem Ai (Universal Love, 1978) for choir and orchestra, The Game of the Five Elements, (1982–1990), or Prajna paramita – the basic sutra of Buddhism – for 6 voices and instrumental ensemble, (1988) and Chu Ky, a series of seven instrumental pieces.

Tôn-Thất Tiết composed the scores for three of Trần Anh Hùng's feature films: The Scent of Green Papaya, Cyclo, and The Vertical Ray of the Sun. He has also collaborated with French choreographer Régine Chopinot on two of her dance pieces: Parole de feu (1995) and Danse du temps (1999).

In 1993, he founded the France-Vietnam Music Association to promote the development of traditional music in Vietnam.
