= Eternity (2016 film) =

2015 film

- Film poster
- Directed by: Tran Anh Hung
- Screenplay by: Tran Anh Hung
- Based on: L'Élégance des veuves by Alice Ferney
- Produced by: Christophe Rossignon; Philip Boëffard
- Starring: Audrey Tautou; Bérénice Bejo; Mélanie Laurent; Jérémie Renier; Pierre Deladonchamps
- Narrated by: Tran Nu Yen Khe
- Cinematography: Mark Lee Ping Bin
- Edited by: Mario Battistel
- Distributed by: Pathé (France); Cinéart (Belgium)
- Release dates: 7 September 2016 (France); 14 September 2016 (Belgium)
- Running time: 115 minutes
- Countries: France; Belgium
- Language: French
- Box office: $910,000

Eternity (French: Éternité) is a 2016 French-Belgian romantic historical drama film written and directed by Tran Anh Hung, and based on the 1995 novel L'Élégance des veuves ("The Elegance of Widows") by Alice Ferney.

The film follows two generations of characters over a century. The cast is led by Audrey Tautou, Bérénice Bejo and Mélanie Laurent as the focus of each time period, together with Jérémie Renier, Pierre Deladonchamps and Irène Jacob. Tran Nu Yen Khe, the director's wife, served as the narrator and art director for the film.

== Cast ==
- Audrey Tautou as Valentine
- Bérénice Bejo as Gabrielle
- Mélanie Laurent as Mathilde
- Jérémie Renier as Henri
- Pierre Deladonchamps as Charles
- Irène Jacob as Gabrielle's mother
- Valérie Stroh as Mathilde's mother
- Arieh Worthalter as Jules
- Philippine Leroy-Beaulieu as Valentine's mother
- Thibault de Montalembert as Valentine's father
- Tran Nu Yen Khe as Narrator

== Reception ==
On the review aggregator website Rotten Tomatoes, 80% of 5 critics' reviews are positive.

The film was nominated for Best Foreign Film in Coproduction in 2017 Magritte Awards.
