= The Third Wife =

2018 Vietnamese drama film

- Theatrical release poster
- Directed by: Ash Mayfair
- Written by: Ash Mayfair
- Produced by: Trần Thị Bích Ngọc; Ash Mayfair
- Starring: Trần Nữ Yên Khê; Nguyễn Phương Trà My; Mai Thu Hường; Lê Vũ Long; Nguyễn Như Quỳnh
- Cinematography: Chananun Chotrungroj
- Edited by: Julie Béziau
- Music by: Tôn Thất An
- Production companies: Mayfair Pictures; An Nam Productions; Three Colors Productions
- Release dates: 7 September 2018 (TIFF); 17 May 2019 (Vietnam)
- Running time: 92 minutes
- Country: Vietnam
- Language: Vietnamese
- Budget: 28 billion đồng

The Third Wife (Vietnamese: Vợ ba) is a 2018 Vietnamese costume drama film written and directed by Ash Mayfair, in her feature debut. Set in the 19th century, it follows a 14-year-old girl who becomes the third wife to a landowner in rural northern Vietnam.

The film premiered at the Toronto International Film Festival in September 2018, where it won the Network for the Promotion of Asian Cinema (NETPAC) Award. It also won the TVE-Another Look Award at the San Sebastian International Film Festival and the Gold Hugo for New Directors at the Chicago International Film Festival in October 2018.

The film was nominated for Best Cinematography, Best Editing, and Someone to Watch Award at the 35th Independent Spirit Awards.

In 2020 Mayfair released a re-worked version of the film called Between Shadow and Soul. The re-worked film used the same footage from the original shoot but reconfigured in black and white and with no dialogue and a new soundtrack.

== Plot ==
14-year-old May is married off as the third wife to a middle-aged landowner of a rural village where silk is harvested. She soon finds that, having given birth to a son, the first wife exerts greater influence in the family than the second, who has only had three daughters, and that the only way to gain security and independence is to give birth to a male child. Her husband's wives are welcoming to her and when she expresses that she finds sex painful they urge her to experiment sexually with herself in order to understand her own desires.

May conceives a child. While this brings further intimacy between May and her husband, she continues to find him unappealing and rejects his sexual advances. She discovers that Xuan, the second wife, is having an affair with her husband’s son from mistress Ha, his first wife. Due to May rejecting her husband, he returns to his first wife and conceives a child with her as well. May prays her own child is a son who will secure her position within the family.

Mistress Ha has a miscarriage and May blames her prayer for a son as the reason for it. She is reassured by Xuan who tells her that throughout her pregnancies, she too prayed for sons. May realizes that she has burgeoning feelings for Xuan and kisses her. Xuan rejects May's advances, brushing it off as a symptom of her pregnancy and telling her she loves her like a daughter. May gives birth to a girl.

Mistress Ha's son is of marrying age and his parents conceive of a match for him. In love with Xuan, he tries to refuse marriage, threatening suicide. He is nevertheless pressured to marry a young girl around May's age. Son is disgusted with the marriage and refuses to touch his new bride. After begging his father to annul the marriage, his father attempts to do so but is rejected by the bride's father. Ashamed, the young bride commits suicide.

May contemplates poisoning her daughter with a plant she saw being used to euthanize the family's livestock. The film ends with one of Xuan's daughters, who had once expressed desire to become a man and have many wives, cutting her hair with a pair of scissors.

== Cast ==
- Trần Nữ Yên Khê as Hà
- Mai Thu Hường as Xuân
- Nguyễn Phương Trà My as Mây
- Nguyễn Như Quỳnh as Lao
- Lê Vũ Long as Hùng
- Nguyễn Thành Tâm as Son
- Lâm Thanh Mỹ as Liên
- Mai Cát Vi as Nhàn
- Nguyễn Hồng Chương as Cụ Bá
- Bùi Trung Anh as Tuyết's father

== Production ==
The film was financed in part by the Spike Lee Production Fund of the Tisch School of the Arts, which its screenplay had won in 2014. More than 900 girls were auditioned for the lead role. Tran Anh Hung provided artistic consultancy.

== Release ==
The film had its world premiere at the Toronto International Film Festival in September 2018, where it won the Network for the Promotion of Asian Cinema (NETPAC) Award. In October 2018, it also screened at the San Sebastian International Film Festival, where it won the TVE-Another Look Award, and at the Chicago International Film Festival in the New Directors Film Competition section, of which it won the Gold Hugo, the top prize.

In Vietnam, the film was released on 17 May 2019, only to be pulled four days later, after drawing criticism for allowing the lead actress Trà My, who was 13 at the time of shooting, to act in sex scenes. The scenes were filmed with only female crew and My's mother present on set. My also said she was protected during the filming. On 20 May, the Ministry of Culture, Sports and Tourism ordered the Cinema Department to review the licensing of the film. On 21 May, producers pulled the film from cinemas, citing concerns over online abuse that had been directed at My and her family. On 24 May, the filmmakers were fined 50 million đồng for releasing an unapproved version despite censors' request to make three cuts to the film. Mayfair described the criticism as "a silencing tactic". Regarding the decision to screen the film in Vietnam, she said, "We had to try, even though we knew we could be attacked by a lot of conservative viewpoints. This is a part of our history that is very dark and this kind of history is perpetuating itself in Vietnamese society still. There are so many artists, and specifically female artists, who don't think they can speak out. So I feel that I have done my part."

== Between Shadow and Soul ==
In 2020 Mayfair release a black and white silent version of the film she renamed Between Shadow and Soul. According to composer An Ton That, Mayfair was inspired to rework the film based on a black and white photo he had taken on set during production. While still in post-production she had been toying with making the film black and white however the initial colour version of the film had already been sent out and been accepted into festivals. She nevertheless continued to work on making the film black and white and eventually settled on stripping the film of its dialogue and asking An Ton That to complete an entirely new score to match the new version of the film.

U.S. distributor Film Movement gave the film a limited theatrical release.

== Reception ==
On review aggregator website Rotten Tomatoes, the film holds an approval rating of 88%, based on 49 reviews, and an average rating of 7.1/10. The site's critical consensus reads, "The Third Wife uses one woman's experiences as the framework for a reserved period drama whose haunting beauty belies its devastating impact." On Metacritic, the film has a weighted average score of 71 out of 100, based on 12 critics, indicating "generally favorable reviews".
