= Det Means Girl =

1995 drama film

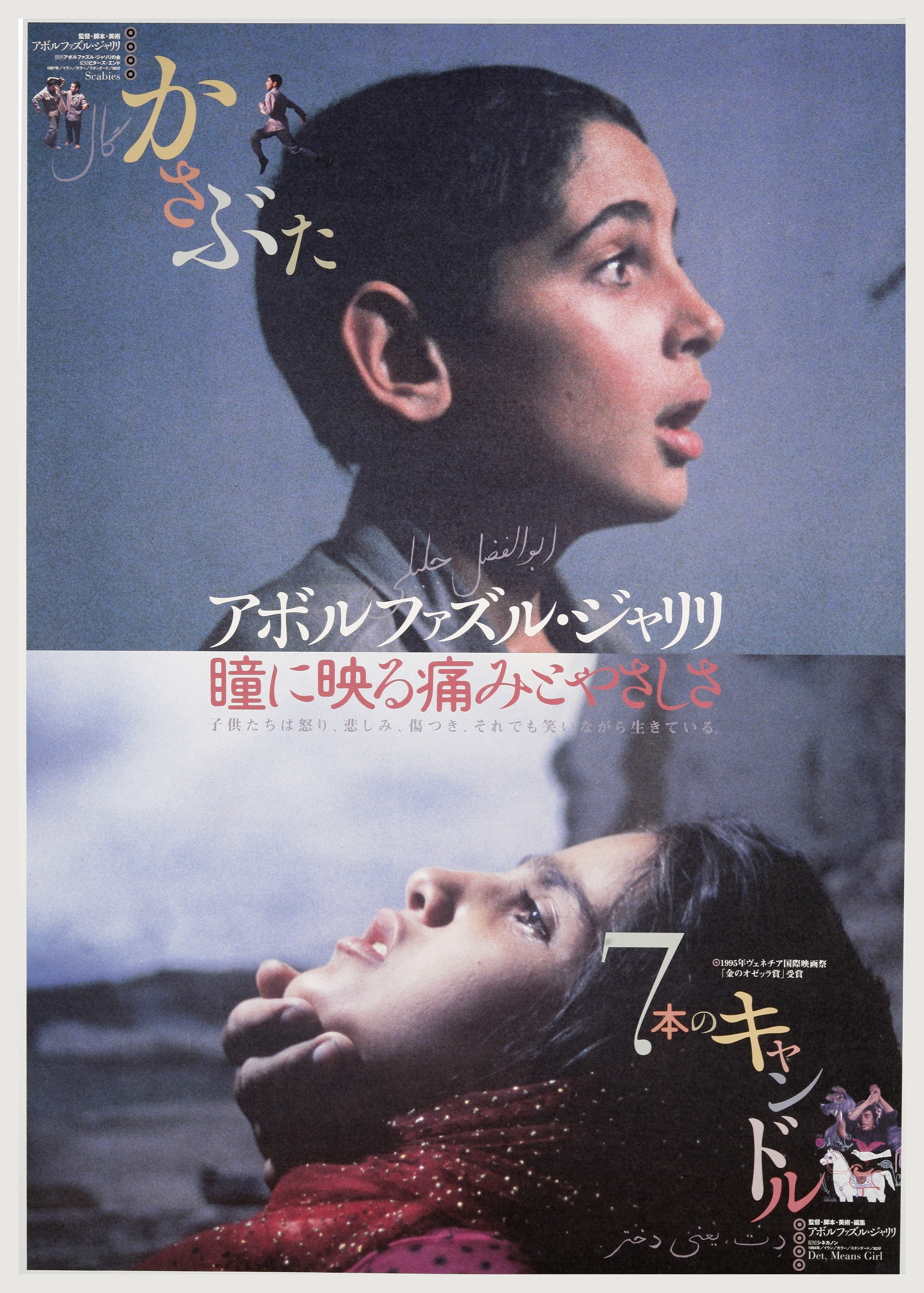
- Directed by: Abolfazl Jalili
- Screenplay by: Abolfazl Jalili
- Produced by: Ali Reza Zarrin
- Starring: Hossein Saki
- Cinematography: Mehdi Majde Vaziri
- Edited by: Abolfazl Jalili
- Release date: 1995
- Language: Persian

Det Means Girl (Persian: دت یعنی دختر, romanized: Det Yani Dokhtar) is a 1995 Iranian drama film written and directed by Abolfazl Jalili. It was entered into the main competition at the 52nd Venice International Film Festival.

== Cast ==
- Hossein Saki as Shuan
- Zeinab Barband as Balot
- Nabi Jalilian as Shuan's Father
- Jaleh Sameti
- Masumeh Kordi

== Production ==
The cast of the film mainly consists of non-professional actors.

== Release ==
The film entered the main competition at the 52nd edition of the Venice Film Festival, in which it won a Golden Osella. It was also screened at the 1995 Three Continents Festival in Nantes, in which Hossein Saki was awarded the prize for best young actor.

== Reception ==
Tullio Kezich from Corriere della Sera praised the film, describing it as a "noble example of neorealism" and an "austere exploration of suffering" whose emphasis is on "the authenticity of its settings and situations, and on the fragile humanity of the non-professional performers portraying their own lives". Irene Bignardi from La Repubblica described it as "a moving and powerful example of Iranian neorealism" and "a heart-wrenching and harrowing film", "conveyed with sparing dialogue and powerful imagery". Variety's critic Deborah Young criticized the film's experimental editing and lack of rhythm, and wrote: "the best Iranian films manage to turn simplicity into a virtue, but on that score Det Means Girl misses the mark".
