= 52nd Venice International Film Festival =

Italian film festival in 1995

- Festival poster
- Location: Venice, Italy
- Founded: 1932
- Awards: Golden Lion: Cyclo
- Festival date: 30 August – 9 September 1995
- Website: Website

Venice Film Festival chronology
- 53rd 51st

The 52nd annual Venice International Film Festival was held between 30 August and 9 September 1995.

Spanish writer Jorge Semprún was the Jury President of the main competition. Tran Anh Hung's Cyclo was the winner of the Golden Lion.

== Jury ==
=== Main Competition ===
The following people comprised the 1995 jury:

- Jorge Semprún, Spanish writer - Jury President
- Guglielmo Biraghi, Italian film critic
- Jean-Pierre Jeunet, French filmmaker
- Abbas Kiarostami, Iranian filmmaker
- Mario Martone, Italian filmmaker
- Peter Rainer, American film critic
- Moses Rothman, Canadian producer
- Margarethe von Trotta, German filmmaker

== Official Section ==
=== In Competition ===
English title	Original title	Director(s)	Production country
Cardiogram	Кардиограмма	Darezhan Omirbayev	Kazakhstan
La Cérémonie		Claude Chabrol	France, Germany
Clockers		Spike Lee	United States
The Crossing Guard		Sean Penn	United States
Cyclo	Xích Lô	Tran Anh Hung	Vietnam, France
Deathmaker	Der Totmacher	Romuald Karmakar	Germany
Det Means Girl	دت یعنی دختر	Abolfazl Jalili	Iran
The Flying Dutchman	De Vliegende Hollander	Jos Stelling	Netherlands
God's Comedy	A Comédia de Deus	João César Monteiro	Portugal
Guantanamera		Tomás Gutiérrez Alea, Juan Carlos Tabío	Cuba
In the Bleak Midwinter		Kenneth Branagh	United Kingdom
Maborosi	幻の光	Hirokazu Koreeda	Japan
Nothing Personal		Thaddeus O'Sullivan	Ireland, United Kingdom
The Story of a Poor Young Man	Romanzo di un giovane povero	Ettore Scola	Italy
Sender Unknown / Return to Sender	Sin remitente	Carlos Carrera	Mexico
The Star Maker	L'Uomo delle stelle	Giuseppe Tornatore	Italy
Who Killed Pasolini?	Pasolini, un delitto italiano	Marco Tullio Giordana	Italy, France

=== Out of Competition ===
English title	Original title	Director(s)	Production country
Beyond the Clouds	Al di là delle nuvole	Michelangelo Antonioni, Wim Wenders	Italy, France
The Journey of August King		John Duigan	United States
Mighty Aphrodite		Woody Allen	United States

=== Venetian Nights ===
English title	Original title	Director(s)	Production country
Apollo 13		Ron Howard	United States
Black Holes	I buchi neri	Pappi Corsicato	Italy
Braveheart		Mel Gibson	United States, Australia
The Day of the Beast	El día de la bestia	Álex de la Iglesia	Spain
Dolores Claiborne		Taylor Hackford	United States
French Twist	Gazon maudit	Josiane Balasko	France
Jade		William Friedkin	United States
Strange Days		Kathryn Bigelow	United States
Waterworld		Kevin Reynolds	United States
Wild Horses	Caballos salvajes	Marcelo Piñeyro	Argentina

=== Window on Images ===
English title	Original title	Director(s)	Production country
Carlota Joaquina, Princess of Brazil	Carlota Joaquina, Princesa do Brazil	Carla Camurati	Brasil
The Doom Generation		Gregg Araki	United States
Flamenco		Carlos Saura	Spain
Guiltrip		Gerard Stembridge	Ireland
Mee Pok Man		Eric Khoo	Singapore
The Pillow Book		Peter Greenaway	United Kingdom
Peculiarities of the National Hunt	Особенности национальной охоты	Aleksandr Rogozhkin	Russia
Sixteen-Oh-Sixty	Dezesseis zero sessenta	Vinicius Mainardi	Brasil
Stonewall		Nigel Finch	United States, United Kingdom
To Have (or Not)	En avoir (ou pas)	Laetitia Masson	France
The Uncle from Brooklyn	Lo zio di Brooklyn	Ciprì & Maresco	Italy

=== Overtaking Lane ===
English title	Original title	Director(s)	Production country
Fiesta		Pierre Boutron	France
I.D.		Philip Davis	United Kingdom
Antarctica		Manuel Huerga	Spain
The Meter Reader	Il verificatore	Stefano Incerti	Italy
A Moslem	Мусульманин	Vladimir Khotinenko	Russia
Rough Magic		Clare Peploe	United Kingdom, France

=== Italian Panorama ===
English title	Original title	Director(s)	Production country
Bandidos		Stefano Mignucci	Italy
Bidons	Bidoni	Felice Farina	Italy
Bits and Pieces	Il cielo è sempre più blu	Antonello Grimaldi	Italy
The Bullet Man	L'uomo proiettile	Silvano Agosti	Italy
Io e il re		Lucio Gaudino	Italy
Marching in Darkness	Marciando nel buio	Massimo Spano	Italy
Palermo - Milan One Way	Palermo Milano - Solo andata	Claudio Fragasso	Italy
The Pink House	La casa rosa	Vanna Paoli	Italy
Vindravan Film Studios		Lamberto Lambertini	Italy

=== Documentaries ===
English title	Original title	Director(s)	Production country
12 novembre		Autori Vari	Italy
’75		Mela Marquez	Bolivia, Italy
Ecce Homo		Vesna Ljubic Sayariy	Bosnia and Herzegovina
La línea paterna		Josè Buil, Marisa Sistach	Mexico
Unzipped		Douglas Keeve	United States
...y otras historias		Juan Carlos Rulfo	Mexico
The Wandering Paddlers	Pao-Jiang-Hu	Mitsuo Yanagimachi	Japan
War Stories		Gaylene Preston, El Abuelo Cheno	New Zealand

== Official Awards ==
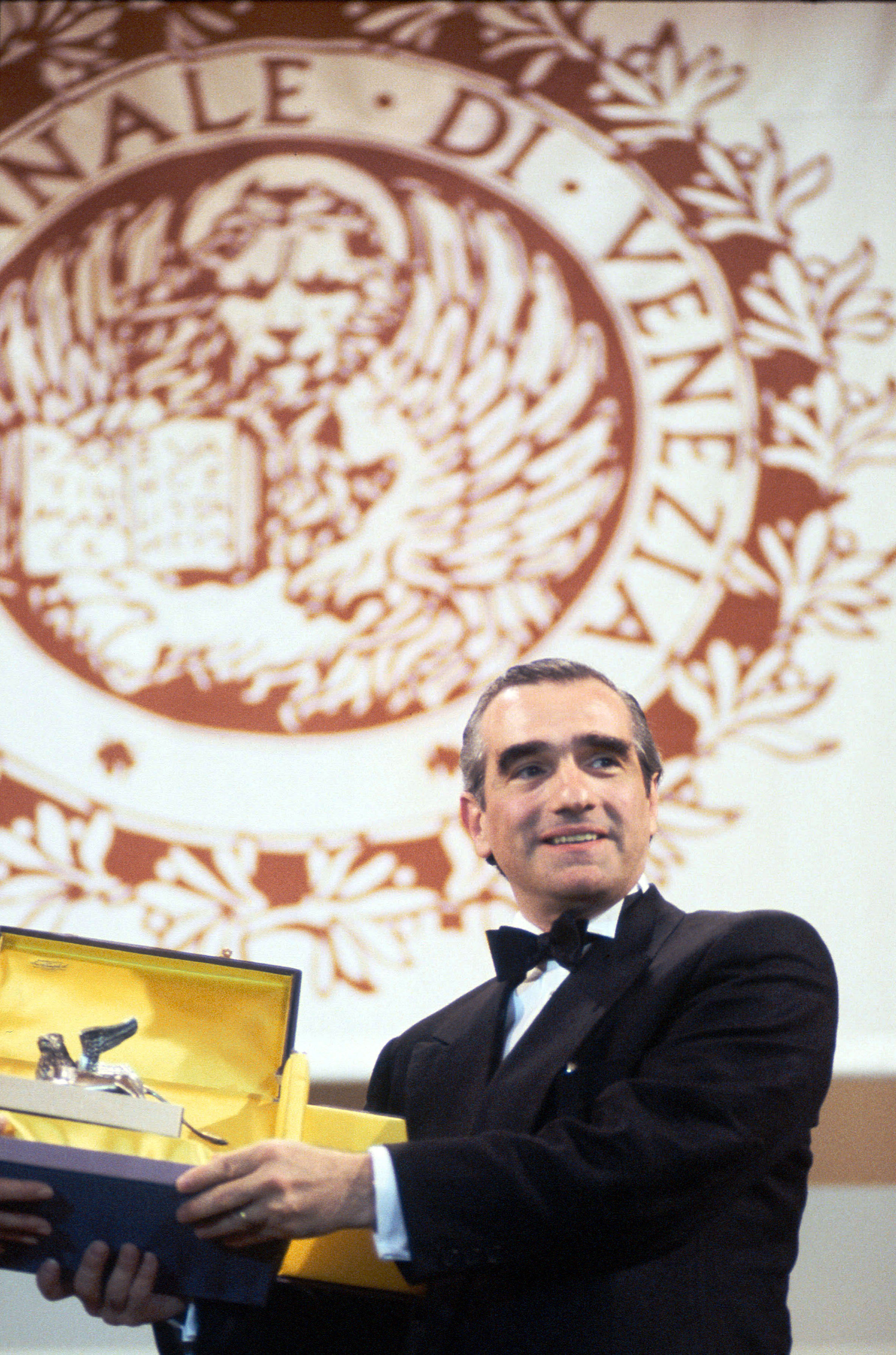
Martin Scorsese received Career Golden Lion at 52nd Venice International Film Festival

=== Main Competition ===
- Golden Lion: Cyclo by Tran Anh Hung
- Grand Special Jury Prize:
  - God's Comedy by João César Monteiro
  - L'uomo delle stelle by Giuseppe Tornatore
- Golden Osella:
  - Best Director: Kenneth Branagh for In the Bleak Midwinter
  - Best Cinematography: Masao Nakabori for Maborosi
  - Best Screenplay: Abolfazl Jalili for Det Means Girl
- Volpi Cup for Best Actor: Götz George for The Deathmaker
  - Best Supporting Actor: Ian Hart for Nothing Personal
- Volpi Cup for Best Actress: Sandrine Bonnaire & Isabelle Huppert for La Cérémonie
  - Best Supporting Actress: Isabella Ferrari for Romanzo di un giovane povero

=== Career Golden Lion ===
- Woody Allen
- Alain Resnais
- Martin Scorsese
- Ennio Morricone
- Alberto Sordi
- Monica Vitti
- Goffredo Lombardo
- Giuseppe De Santis

== Independent Awards ==
=== The President of the Italian Senate's Gold Medal ===
- Marco Tullio Giordana for Pasolini, un delitto italiano

=== FIPRESCI Prize ===
- Xich lo by Anh Hung Tran
- Beyond the Clouds by Michelangelo Antonioni & Wim Wenders

=== OCIC Award - Honorable Mention ===
- Hirokazu Koreeda for Maborosi

=== Pasinetti Award ===
- Best Film: God's Comedy by João César Monteiro
- Best Actor: Sergio Castellitto for L'uomo delle stelle
- Best Actress: Sandrine Bonnaire & Isabelle Huppert for La Cérémonie

=== Pietro Bianchi Award ===
- Giuseppe Rotunno
- Luigi Magni

=== Elvira Notari Prize - Special Mention ===
- Márta Mészáros & Maia Morgenstern for The Seventh Room

=== AIACE Award ===
- Carlo Sigon for Ketchup
