= Norwegian Wood =

Norwegian Wood may refer to:

- "Norwegian Wood (This Bird Has Flown)", a 1965 song by the Beatles
- Norwegian Wood (novel), a 1987 novel by Haruki Murakami
- Norwegian Wood (film), a 2010 Japanese film based on the novel
- Norwegian Wood (music festival), an annual music festival in Oslo, Norway
- For woodland in Norway, see Geography of Norway § Flora
