= In the Bleak Midwinter (film) =

- Directed by: Kenneth Branagh
- Written by: Kenneth Branagh
- Produced by: David Barron
- Starring: Richard Briers; Hetta Charnley; Joan Collins; Nicholas Farrell; Mark Hadfield; Gerard Horan; Celia Imrie; Michael Maloney; Julia Sawalha
- Cinematography: Roger Lanser
- Edited by: Neil Farrell
- Music by: Jimmy Yuill
- Production company: Castle Rock Entertainment
- Distributed by: Rank-Castle Rock/Turner
- Release dates: 10 September 1995 (Toronto International Film Festival); 1 December 1995 (UK)
- Running time: 99 minutes
- Country: United Kingdom
- Language: English
- Box office: $0.8 million (UK/USA)

In the Bleak Midwinter (released in the US as A Midwinter's Tale) is a 1995 British romantic comedy film written and directed by Kenneth Branagh. Many of the roles in the film were written for specific actors. This was the first film directed by Branagh in which he did not appear.

The film begins with a monologue by out-of-work actor Joe Harper (Michael Maloney) about his slow decline into depression. In an attempt to beat his depression, Joe volunteers to help try to save his sister's local church from land developers for the community by putting on a Christmas production of Hamlet, somewhat against the advice of his agent Margaretta (Joan Collins). As the cast he assembles are still available even at Christmas and are prepared to do it on a 'profit sharing' basis (that is, they may not get paid anything), he cannot expect – and does not get – the cream of the cream. But although they all bring their own problems and foibles along, something bigger starts to emerge in the perhaps aptly named village of Hope. This film encapsulates the hilarious and heartbreaking struggle of actor versus situation versus life, and often versus each other. It was shot in black and white.

== Plot ==
Joe Harper, a depressed and down-on-his-luck actor, asks his agent Margaretta D'Arcy to lend him money to put on a Christmastime production of Shakespeare's Hamlet in his hometown of Hope, Derbyshire. Wanting the rendition to be "free and experimental", Joe holds auditions that attract a variety of performers, most of whom Margaretta thinks are mad. In the end, Joe casts six actors: the well-meaning Nina Raymond; the long-suffering and cynical Henry Wakefield; the flamboyant homosexual Terry DuBois; the vain Tom Newman; alcoholic-in-denial Carnforth Greville; and former child actor Vernon Spatch. Joe casts himself as Hamlet.

Recruiting his sister Molly, Joe transports the actors and props their venue: a decrepit church that is due for demolition by developers. Despite being disheartened that the venue is also their digs, as well as not having expenses paid for them, the actors decide to stay. There, they meet their costume and set designer, the new-age Fadge, who proposes to have some of the audience as cardboard figurines and use only smoke for set design.

Rehearsals begin with a shaky start. Carnforth cannot remember his lines and often turns up drunk, Tom insists on using outrageous accents for each of his roles, Henry hates sharing a room with Terry, Nina's bad eyesight causes accidents, and Molly is forced to play Hamlet during rehearsals so Joe can direct. Later, the landlord of the church demands an extra week of rent, which Joe does not have, and the show does not sell a single advance ticket. Four days before the tech run, Joe insists the actors do not lose their nerve, and receives encouragement from Nina, who he learns is a widow.

Vernon comes to Joe's rescue by giving out flyers and selling tickets on the streets and at a hotel he is performing a cabaret at. Henry and Terry gradually learn to tolerate each other through their mutual respect of Henry Irving. Terry reveals he has an estranged son, Tim. This makes his role as Gertrude difficult as Joe encourages the actors to be the characters. One night, Tom breaks down from Carnforth's mistakes, Joe's direction and Vernon's insistence in documenting the production. This makes Joe suffer his own breakdown, saying that the production was a mistake, that it has become too personal for them all, that their time has run out and that he has no money to pay for them nor securing the venue for the run of the show. Calming down, Henry and Molly reassure him to continue.

With Joe now acting during the rehearsals, the production improves significantly. Vernon reveals to Joe the company has had a whip-round to improve the financial situation. After the technical rehearsal, Joe receives a call from Margaretta, who tells him that he has been offered a three-picture movie deal from American producer Nancy Crawford, but he has to cut off before she tells him about travel arrangements. On Christmas Eve, the night of the first performance, Margaretta arrives early to tell Joe that he has to leave to catch a flight to Los Angeles with Crawford - meaning he will be absent from the first performance. The company begrudgingly say their farewells to Joe, with Molly filling for Hamlet and Nina tearfully begging for Joe to stay for his well-being, to no avail.

The audience arrives, including Carnforth's mother, Nina's father and Tim (who Henry contacted, telling him that Terry has cholera). Crawford and Margaretta also arrive along with a national newspaper reporter. During Molly's first scene, Joe returns, having been allowed to do the first performance and let Crawford see him act live. The production goes well, and the company meet backstage, where Crawford reveals that she only watched the performance to see why Joe rejected her offer. Instead, she offers Joe's role to Tom, who has Fadge brought along as a designer for the film, and Margaretta offers herself as an agent to them.

When the audience leaves, the company starts dancing, and Nina and Joe begin a relationship as Christmas Day begins.

== Cast ==
- Michael Maloney as Joe Harper (Hamlet), a depressed actor, producer and director the show.
- Richard Briers as Henry Wakefield (Claudius, the Ghost, and the Player King), a long-suffering and cynical old Englishman with a sharp tongue and a list of prejudices five miles long.
- Hetta Charnley as Molly Harper, Joe's sister and assistant during the production.
- Joan Collins as Margaretta D'Arcy, Joe's catty agent.
- Nicholas Farrell as Tom Newman (Laertes, Fortinbras, and messengers), a vain, self-righteous method actor who foists his values on everyone else and attempts to distinguish his many characters with a variety of outrageous accents.
- Mark Hadfield as Vernon Spatch (Polonius, Marcellus, and First Gravedigger), a former child actor, the ambitious techie's techie, self-imposed marketing director, and unofficial documentarian of the proceedings.
- Gerard Horan as Carnforth Greville/Keith Branch (Rosencrantz, Guildenstern, Horatio, and Barnardo), an alcoholic in denial and a kindly bachelor with no memory for lines whatsoever.
- Celia Imrie as Fadge, Joe's set and costume designer, specialising in new-age art and obscure statements about "air", "space", and "fog". Close friends call her "Fa".
- Jennifer Saunders as Nancy Crawford, an American producer.
- Julia Sawalha as Nina Raymond (Ophelia), a shortsighted well-meaning space cadet who has been using low-calorie mayonnaise for lotion because she can't make out the label.
- John Sessions as Terry Du Bois (Queen Gertrude), a flamboyantly gay theatrical actor with an estranged son and a preoccupation with costume.
- Ann Davies as Mrs. Branch, Carnforth's mother.
- James D. White as Tim
- Robert Hines as Mortimer
- Allie Byrne as Tap Dancer
- Adrian Scarborough as Young Actor
- Brian Pettifer as Ventriloquist
- Patrick Doyle as Scotsman
- Shaun Prendergast as Mule Train Man
- Carol Starks as Audience Member
- Edward Jewesbury as Nina's Father
- Katy Carmichael as Mad Puppet Woman (uncredited)
- Paul Randles- Extra

== Reception ==
=== Critical response ===
On the review aggregator website Rotten Tomatoes, 81% of 26 critics' reviews are positive.

Roger Ebert, noted critic of the Chicago Sun-Times, gave the film three out of four stars, praising the performances and Branagh's screenplay. James Berardinelli praised the film, giving it three-and-a-half out of four stars, stating, "No current film maker appears to love and understand Shakespeare as well as Branagh, and never has his affection for the Bard been more apparent than here. This picture succeeds as a comedy, a satire, and even, to a certain extent, as a mild melodrama about choosing between a paycheck and the nourishment of the soul." Berardinelli concluded, "Anyone who wondered about Branagh's future following Frankenstein can set their concerns to rest. He's back on top in the independent arena with A Midwinter's Tale, a film that offers ninety-eight minutes of pure fun re-interpreting the phrase 'the play's the thing'."

=== Box office ===
In the UK, it grossed £235,302 in its first month of release. In the United States and Canada it grossed $469,571.

=== Accolades ===
As a competitive entry at the 52nd Venice International Film Festival in 1995, In the Bleak Midwinter was among the finalists for the Golden Lion award, and Kenneth Branagh received the Golden Osella for Best Director.
