= Sylvie Olivé =

French production designer

- Occupation: Production designer
- Years active: 1990 – present

Sylvie Olivé is a French production designer of film and television. She is a member of the Association des Décorateurs de Cinéma (ADC). She is most notable for her work in Mr. Nobody (2009), which earned her the Golden Osella for Outstanding Technical Contribution at the 66th Venice International Film Festival.

== Selected filmography ==
Year	Title	Director	Notes
1990	La Discrète	Christian Vincent	
1992	Beau fixe	Christian Vincent	
1994	Les Braqueuses	Jean-Paul Salomé	
1995	Adultery: A User's Guide	Christine Pascal	
2001	Gregoire Moulin vs. Humanity	Artus de Penguern	
2002	Irène	Ivan Calbérac	
2006	Un ticket pour l'espace	Éric Lartigau	
2006	I Do	Éric Lartigau	
2009	Mr. Nobody	Jaco Van Dormael	Golden Osella for Outstanding Technical Contribution
2010	Romantics Anonymous	Jean-Pierre Améris	
2012	Populaire	Régis Roinsard	Nominated—César Award for Best Production Design
2013	Me, Myself and Mum	Guillaume Gallienne	Nominated—César Award for Best Production Design
2014	Lou! Journal infime	Julien Neel	
2015	The Brand New Testament	Jaco Van Dormael	European Film Award for Best Production Designer
2015	The Student and Mister Henri	Ivan Calbérac	
2017	L'Amant double	François Ozon	
2019	School Life	Grand Corps Malade	
2019	The Translators	Régis Roinsard	
