= Mothers' Instinct (2024 film) =

Film by Benoît Delhomme

- Theatrical release poster
- Directed by: Benoît Delhomme
- Screenplay by: Sarah Conradt
- Based on: Derrière la haine by Barbara Abel; Duelles by Olivier Masset-Depasse
- Produced by: Kelly Carmichael; Jessica Chastain; Anne Hathaway; Paul Nelson; Jacques-Henri Bronckart
- Starring: Jessica Chastain; Anne Hathaway; Josh Charles; Anders Danielsen Lie
- Cinematography: Benoît Delhomme
- Edited by: Juliette Welfling
- Music by: Anne Nikitin
- Production companies: Anton; Freckle Films; Mosaic; Versus
- Distributed by: Neon
- Release dates: March 8, 2024 (Lithuania); July 26, 2024 (United States)
- Running time: 94 minutes
- Country: United States
- Language: English
- Box office: $3.4 million

Mothers' Instinct is a 2024 American psychological thriller film directed by Benoît Delhomme in his directorial debut, and starring Jessica Chastain, Anne Hathaway, Anders Danielsen Lie, and Josh Charles. It is a remake of Olivier Masset-Depasse's 2018 French-language film, which itself was an adaptation of the 2012 novel Derrière la haine by Barbara Abel.

Mothers' Instinct tells the story of two suburban neighbors, Alice and Céline, whose lives are disrupted by a tragic accident. It was released in Lithuania on March 8, 2024, and was released in the United States on July 26, 2024. It received mixed reviews and grossed $3.4 million at the box office.

== Plot ==
In 1960 suburban America, Alice Bradford and Céline Jennings are next-door neighbors and mothers to boys of a similar age. Alice stages a surprise party for Céline's birthday. The next day, Céline's son Max stays home sick from school. Alice, pruning roses in her own garden, spots him standing precariously on a balcony, trying to hang a birdhouse he made at school.

Alice, realizing the danger, tries to crawl through a small tunnel-like break in the hedge separating the two properties but her large sunhat prevents her from doing so quickly. She then runs around the hedge to reach the front door and attempts to alert Céline, who is inside vacuuming. The two are unable to act quickly enough and Max falls to his death.

After Max's death, Céline distances herself from Alice, but grows closer to Alice's son, Theo. At Max's funeral, Theo notices one of his own toys in Max's coffin and lashes out. After the funeral, Céline leaves for an unknown location for a month, and when she returns, she reconciles with Alice.

One day, Alice leaves Theo with Céline at her house and she sees Theo playing with bubbles on the same balcony Max fell from. She panics and runs to him, but this time she crawls through the passageway in the hedge and immediately gets near Céline's house. Céline appears beside Theo, explaining she was watching him, but she quickly noticed Alice could get through the hedge for her own son, unlike the last time for Max. Alice also notices that and thinks the incident was Céline's attempt to test her.

Theo grows even closer with Céline, to the point of inviting her to his birthday party, much to Alice's dismay. The party goes as expected, but afterward, Alice's mother-in-law (Simon's mother) suddenly collapses, dying of a heart attack. Simon's mother has been taking medication for her heart, but an autopsy carried out at Alice's request reveals no trace of that medication in her bloodstream.

Alice suspects that Céline has been replacing the drug with a placebo, but her attempts to find evidence prove fruitless. Alice's suspicions deepen when Theo is hospitalized after a severe allergic reaction at Céline's, with her believing Céline has deliberately encouraged Theo to eat food to which he is allergic. Alice enters Céline's house while she is out one day to attempt to find evidence, but Céline catches her and orders her to leave.

Alice and Céline eventually reconcile after Theo threatens to take his own life in response to their feud. Simon finds a house so their family can move away from Céline, and Alice breaks the news to Céline. Later that night, Céline kills Damian, her husband, by sedating him with chloroform and slicing his wrist, making it look like a suicide. Alice and Simon allow a seemingly distraught Céline to stay with them.

However, while Alice goes to Céline's house to gather the rest of Céline's things, Céline sedates Simon and Theo. When Alice discovers this, the two women fight. Alice initially fends off Céline's attempt to forcibly sedate her, but Céline later succeeds. She kills both her and Simon by disconnecting their boiler to stage a gas leak. She spares Theo and later adopts him.

== Cast ==
- Jessica Chastain as Alice
- Anne Hathaway as Céline
- Anders Danielsen Lie as Simon, Alice's husband
- Josh Charles as Damian, Céline's husband
- Eamon O'Connell as Theo
- Caroline Lagerfelt as Granny Jean
- Baylen D. Bielitz as Max

== Production ==
In October 2020, it was reported that Olivier Masset-Depasse was hired to direct. Jessica Chastain and Anne Hathaway were cast to star in the film, with Chastain's production company Freckle Films producing. In June 2022, Benoît Delhomme replaced Masset-Depasse as director after leaving due to a "family commitment", marking his directorial debut. Josh Charles and Anders Danielsen Lie were also added to the cast.

Principal photography began on May 25, 2022, in Union County, New Jersey. Cranford, New Jersey was selected since it was the only location found to have the correct similar housing specification

Hathaway described the role as "the hardest role I have played", as it involved confronting her worst fear.

== Release ==
In May 2022, Neon acquired the American distribution rights. The following month, StudioCanal acquired the rights for the United Kingdom and Ireland, while Amazon MGM Studios bought the rights for Canada, Australia, and New Zealand.

Mothers' Instinct was released in Lithuania on March 8, 2024. It was released in the UK on March 27, 2024. It was released in China on May 24, 2024, in 2,500 theaters. It was released in Spain on June 14, 2024 in 290 theaters by Vértice 360. It was released theatrically on six screens in the United States on July 26, 2024, and through digital platforms on August 13, 2024.

== Reception ==
On the review aggregator website Rotten Tomatoes, 55% of 66 critics' reviews are positive, with an average rating of 5.7/10. The website's consensus reads: "Mothers' Instinct is a glossily enjoyable showcase for Jessica Chastain and Anne Hathaway, although the stars are ill-served by a thin story and shaky tonal command." Metacritic, which uses a weighted average, assigned the film a score of 47 out of 100, based on 19 critics, indicating "mixed or average" reviews.

Guy Lodge of Variety wrote, "[but] Mothers' Instinct doesn't breathe: It hasn't the grandeur of great melodrama, nor the savoir-faire of great noir. Like its mismatched heroines, it's constantly, twitchily figuring itself out, as we sit tight, intrigued, tensely waiting for it to trip".
