= Curnonsky =

French food writer (1872 – 1956)

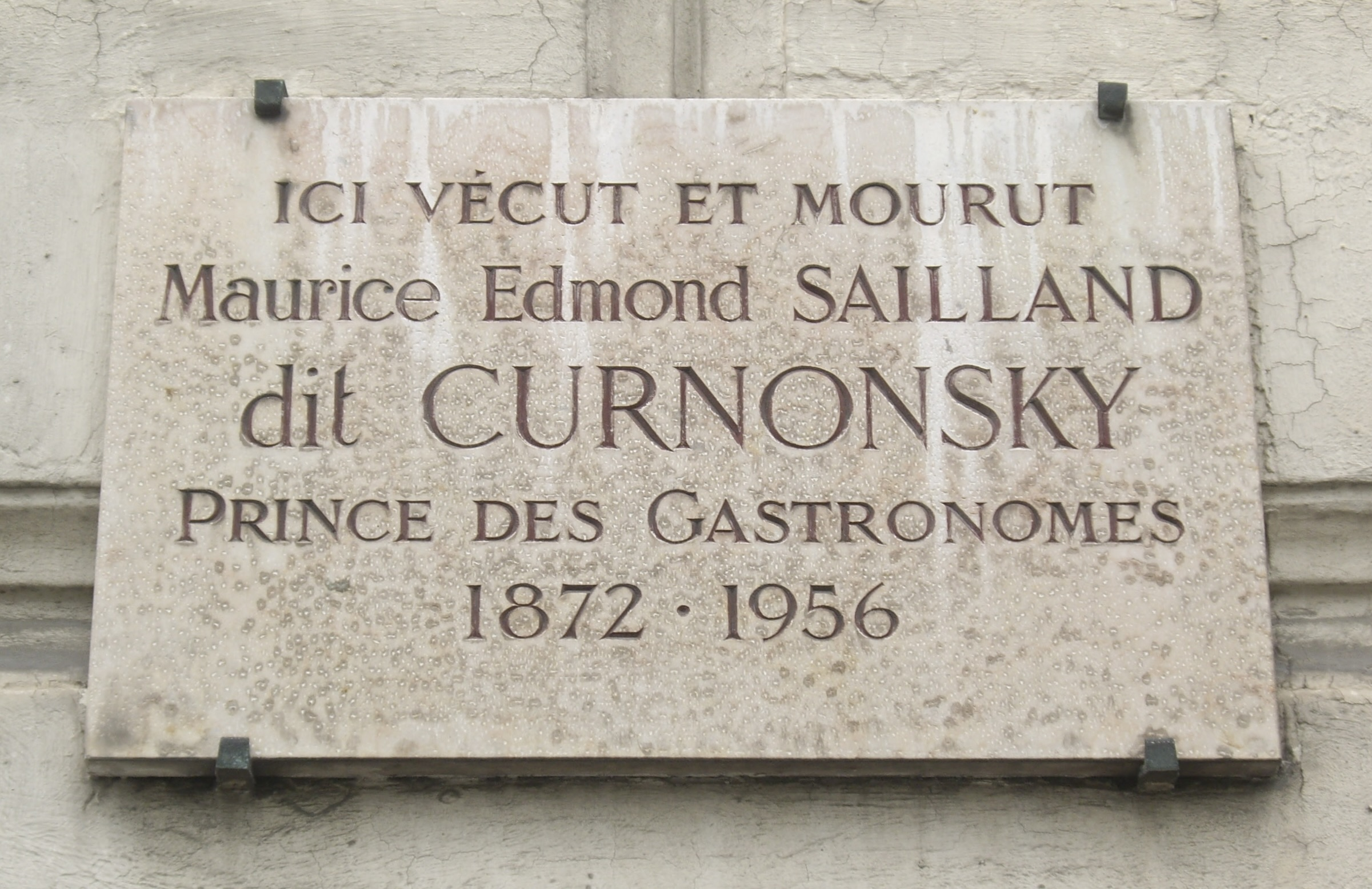
Commemorative plaque at 14, place Henri-Bergson, Paris.

Maurice Edmond Sailland (Note: Some sources spell it 'Saillant', but the 'd' spelling is used in his autobiography and most other reliable sources.) (October 12, 1872, in Angers, France – July 22, 1956, in Paris), better known by his pen-name Curnonsky (nicknamed 'Cur'), and dubbed the Prince of Gastronomy, was one of the most celebrated writers on gastronomy in France in the 20th century. He wrote or ghost-wrote many books in diverse genres and many newspaper columns. He is often considered the inventor of gastronomic motor-tourism as popularized by Michelin, though he himself could not drive. He was a student of Henri-Paul Pellaprat.

== Biography ==
Maurice Edmond Sailland was born in Angers (Maine-et-Loire) on October 12, 1872 to Edmond-Georges Sailland and his wife Blanche-Alphonsine Mazeran. His mother died within a month of his birth, and his father abandoned him. He was raised by his grandmother in Angers and attended the Collège Saint-Maurille in town. At the age of 18, he moved to Paris to attend the Ecole Normale Supérieure to prepare for a career in journalism.

Curnonsky's friend Paul Reboux wrote in 1933: "For 40 years, Curnonsky did almost all of the jobs in the literary profession. He was a novelist, a columnist, a humorist, a publicists, a music hall critic ... and a 'discreet collaborator,' that is to say, a 'ghost writer.' ... But it would be to speak of Curnonsky in a quite incomplete manner to not insist on his merits as a gastronome." His role in promoting French gastronomy is perhaps what he is best known for today.

Curnonsky took every occasion to promote his theory of the four cuisines of France:

La Haute Cuisine, celle des Grands chefs, qui, disons-le n'est pas à la portée de toutes les bourses ...
La Cuisine Bourgeoise, triomphe des bonnes maîtresses de maison et de nos cordons bleus auteurs d'une cuisine simple et parfaite.
La Cuisine Impromptue, celle des campeurs, de ceux qui vont à pied, celle qui se fait à l'INFORTUNE DU POT. Naturellement la conserve y a sa part. Mais la conserverie française est parfaite.
Enfin la Cuisine Régionale, celle qui réalise en France la sainte alliance du tourisme et de la gastronomie.

Haute Cuisine, that of the Great Chefs which, to be clear, is not available to all pocketbooks...
Bourgeois Cuisine, the triumph of good middle-class women and our cordon bleus, creators of a simple and perfect cuisine.
Impromptu Cuisine, that of campers, of those who go by foot, which uses whatever is available. Naturally canned foods have their place here. But French canning is perfect.
Finally, Regional Cuisine, which in France achieves the Holy Alliance of tourism and gastronomy.

Curnonsky's professional activities were truly wide-ranging. He even created a number of advertising slogans for important companies. According to his biographer Arbellot, he coined the name Bibendum for the Michelin Man in 1907—because "Michelin tires drink [i.e. 'soak up' or 'eat up'] everything, even obstacles"—, and wrote Michelin's weekly column "Les Lundis de Michelin" in Le Journal starting on November 25, 1907. It was originally signed "Michelin" but starting on March 2, 1908, it was signed "Bibendum". Michelin had used the phrase "Nunc est bibendum" ("Cheers!" in Latin) on a poster in 1898, showing the Michelin Man swallowing a glass full of nails, but it is unclear when the word "Bibendum" became applied to this character.

In 1921, he began writing a series of regional travel guides with Marcel Rouff, published under the collective title of La France Gastronomique: Guide des merveilles culinaires et des bonnes auberges françaises (Gastronomic France: Guide to the culinary marvels and the good inns of France). This was the early days of automobile tourism, which served to highlight the regional foods of France. Curnonsky and Rouff played an important role in the increasing popularity of discovering regional dishes and restaurants. Between 1921 and 1928, Curnonsky and Rouff wrote 28 volumes, which totaled 3,000 pages and included more than 5,000 recipes. The historian Julia Csergo writes that Curnonsky and Rouff "invented the 'gastronomic guide' with the publication of their Gastronomic Tour of France".

He was named a knight of the Légion d'Honneur in 1928 and was made an officer in 1938.

In 1928, he co-founded the Académie des gastronomes, modelled on the Académie Française, and served as its first president, until 1949. In 1947, he started the magazine Cuisine et Vins de France along with Madeleine Decure. In 1950, he was a co-founder of the Confrérie de la Chaîne des Rôtisseurs His other associations included honorary member of the Club des Purs Cent, member of the Association des Gastronomes régionalistes, and member of the Académie de l'Humour.

To honor his eightieth birthday, eighty restaurants marked his favorite table with a copper plaque reading:

Cette place est celle

de Maurice Edmond Sailland-Curnonsky
Prince élu des gastronomes
Défenseur et illustrateur de la Cuisine française

Hôte d'honneur de cette maison

This led to the legend that eighty restaurants reserved a table for him every night in case he should show up, though by that point, he rarely went out at all.

Curnonsky died on July 22, 1956, at the age of 83. He fell out of the window of his third floor Paris apartment. He was on a severe diet at the time and was anemic, thus it was speculated that he had fainted while standing on his balcony. A year later a commemorative plaque on nr. 14 of the place Henri-Bergson, Paris 8e was installed and a booklet published on this occasion.

== Name ==
The name "Curnonsky" comes from the Latin cur + non "why not?" plus the Russian suffix -sky, as all things Russian were in vogue in 1895, when he coined it. He once said that this nickname was "my tunic of Nessus, as I am neither Russian, nor Polish, nor Jewish, nor Ukrainian, but just an average Frenchman and wine-guy [sacavin]". He would later come to regret his pen name, but by then his literary career was launched. Sailland wrote, co-wrote, and ghost wrote over 150 books, some under other pseudonyms, including Perdiccas, Sailland-Curnonsky, and Maurice Curnonsky.

In 1927, the newspaper Paris-Soir organized an election, or referendum, among its readers to choose the "prince of the gastronomes." Curnonsky (who signed his articles as "Cur" at this time) beat out the likes of Maurice des Ombiaux, Léon Daudet, and Ali Bab. For the next several years, into early 1930, he edited a weekly full-page feature in Paris-Soir entitled "Annales of Gastronomy"; on the masthead he was identified as "Cur I, Prince des Gastronomes."

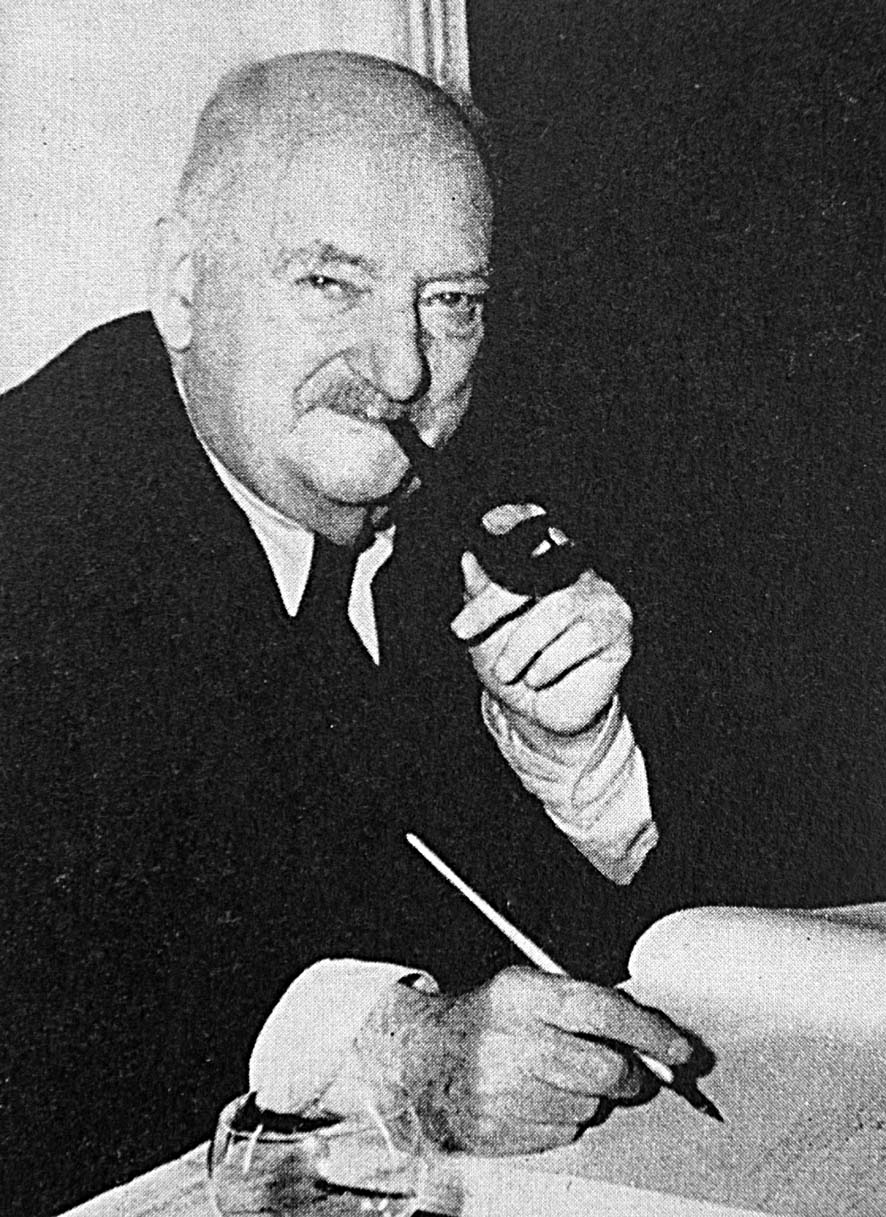
Curnonsky

== Philosophy ==
A celebrated aphorism of Curnonsky's was:

La cuisine, c'est quand les choses ont le goût de ce qu'elles sont.
Good cooking is when things taste of what they are.

He advocated simple food over complicated, rustic over refined, and often repeated the phrase

Et surtout, faites simple!
And above all, keep it simple!

In a 1937 interview, Curnonsky drew a contrast between his philosophy of French cuisine and that of the great chefs of the day. He noted that he was elected "democratic prince [of gastronomy] ... by the cooks and cordon bleus who, every day, make healthy, simple, good food," and the great chefs, "the grand aristocrats of cuisine, the Prosper Montagnés, the Escoffiers, the Philéas Gilberts, ... who, in Paris or in the provinces, maintain the traditions of elaborate and skilled French cuisine." Curnonsky praised women who he believed cooked by instinct, without formal training. It was a cuisine that was "straightforward, clear in taste and never aimed at effect... A tranquil and well-prepared cuisine, a cuisine of cordon bleu."

== Partial bibliography ==
- By Curnonsky
  - with Marcel Rouff, La France Gastronomique: Guides des merveilles culinaires et des bonnes auberges françaises Paris, 1921–29, in 28 volumes.
  - with Austin de Croze, Le Trésor gastronomique de la France, 1933.
  - with Marcel-E. Grancher, Lyon Capitale Mondiale de la Gastronomie, Les Editions Lugdunum, Lyon, 1935
  - Cuisine et Vins de France. Paris, 1953. A collection of recipes collected by Curnonsky from restaurants. New edition, with preface and updates by Robert Courtine, Paris: Larousse, 1974 ISBN 2-03-018110-2.
  - Souvenirs Littéraires et Gastronomiques, Paris: Albin Michel, 1958.
- Curnonsky: Prince des Gastronomes, Simon Arbellot, Paris: Les Productions de Paris, 1965. Biography.
- Curnonsky et ses amis, Association des amis de Curnonsky, Paris: Librairie Edgar Soete, 1979. A collection of reminiscences.
- Curnonsky – à la carte... Munich: Edition Curnonska, 2007
- Curnonsky – en route... Munich: Edition Curnonska, 2007
- Curnonsky – souvenirs gastronomiques... Munich: Edition Curnonska, 2007

In 2003, German art historian Inge Huber discovered five boxes with letters of Curnonsky, and authored a biography "Curnonsky. Oder das Geheimnis des Maurice-Edmond Sailland" 2010, Rolf Heyne Editor.

== See also ==
- Marcel Boulestin
- Marcel Rouff
- Eugènie Brazier
