= Norwegian Wood (film) =

2010 Japanese romantic drama film by Tran Anh Hung

- Film poster
- Directed by: Tran Anh Hung
- Screenplay by: Tran Anh Hung
- Based on: Norwegian Wood by Haruki Murakami
- Produced by: Chihiro Kameyama; Shinji Ogawa
- Starring: Kenichi Matsuyama; Rinko Kikuchi; Kiko Mizuhara
- Cinematography: Mark Lee Ping Bin
- Edited by: Mario Battistel
- Music by: Jonny Greenwood
- Distributed by: Toho
- Release dates: 2 September 2010 (Venice); 11 December 2010 (Japan)
- Running time: 133 minutes
- Country: Japan
- Language: Japanese
- Box office: US$17.6 million

Norwegian Wood (ノルウェイの森, Noruwei no Mori) is a 2010 Japanese romantic drama film written and directed by Tran Anh Hung, based on the 1987 novel by Haruki Murakami. It was released in Japan on 11 December 2010. The score was composed by Jonny Greenwood.

== Plot ==
Toru Watanabe is a quiet and serious young man in 1960s Tokyo whose personal life is in tumult, having lost his best friend Kizuki after he inexplicably commits suicide. Seeking an escape, Toru enters a university in Tokyo. By chance, during a walk in a park, Toru meets Kizuki's ex-girlfriend Naoko, and they grow close. Naoko continues to be devastated by the loss of Kizuki and spirals into a deep depression.

Toru sleeps with Naoko on her 20th birthday. Shortly afterwards, Naoko withdraws from the world and leaves for a sanitarium in a remote forest setting near Kyoto. Toru is anguished by the situation, as he still has deep feelings for Naoko, but she is unable to reciprocate. He also lives with the influence of death everywhere, while Naoko feels as if some integral part of her has been permanently lost. He continues with his studies, and during the spring semester meets an attractive girl and fellow student Midori, who is everything that Naoko is not—outgoing, vivacious, and supremely self-confident. The story then follows Toru as he is torn between the two women in his life, and choosing between his past and his future.

== Cast ==
- Kenichi Matsuyama as Toru Watanabe
- Rinko Kikuchi as Naoko
- Kiko Mizuhara as Midori Kobayashi
- Tetsuji Tamayama as Nagasawa
- Kengo Kora as Kizuki
- Reika Kirishima as Reiko Ishida
- Eriko Hatsune as Hatsumi
- Shigesato Itoi as the Professor
- Haruomi Hosono as the Record Shop Manager
- Yukihiro Takahashi as the Gatekeeper

== Soundtrack ==
The score was composed by Jonny Greenwood. He used a Japanese nylon-strung guitar with home recording equipment from the 1960s, attempting to create a recording that one of the characters might have made.

== Release ==
This film debuted in the 67th Venice International Film Festival where it competed for the Golden Lion. It was then subsequently released in Japanese cinemas on 11 December 2010.

In the United Kingdom, it was released on 11 March 2011. In the United States, the film had a limited release on 6 January 2012 in New York City and Washington D.C. In Canada, the film was released on 2 March 2012.

== Reception ==
The Daily Telegraph said that Hung was "brave" to attempt to adapt Murakami's 1987 novel but that "the film comes across as a mere summary of Murakami's book". Stephen Holden of The New York Times wrote that it "registers less as a coherent narrative than as a tortuous reverie steeped in mournful yearning".

On the review aggregator website Rotten Tomatoes, 73% of 63 critics' reviews are positive. The website's consensus reads: "Norwegian Wood is a poetic adaptation of the Haruki Murakami novel that uses rapturous visuals to draw viewers in its exploration of young love and lasting death." Metacritic, which uses a weighted average, assigned the film a score of 58 out of 100, based on 19 critics, indicating "mixed or average" reviews.

=== Accolades ===
Film Festival	Date of ceremony	Category	Participants/Recipients	Result
67th Venice International Film Festival	2 September 2010	Golden Lion	Norwegian Wood	Nominated
35th Toronto International Film Festival	9 September 2010	Special Presentations	Norwegian Wood	Participant
7th Dubai International Film Festival	12 December 2010	Muhr Asia Africa	Norwegian Wood	Nominated
7th Dubai International Film Festival	12 December 2010	Muhr Asia Africa Best Composer	Jonny Greenwood	Won
5th Asian Film Awards	21 March 2011	Best Actress	Rinko Kikuchi	Nominated
5th Asian Film Awards	21 March 2011	Best Cinematography	Mark Lee Ping-bin	Won
5th Asian Film Awards	21 March 2011	Best Costume Design	Yen-khe Luguern	Nominated
30th Istanbul International Film Festival	April 2011	FIPRESCI	Tran Anh Hung	Won
