= American Virgin (1999 film) =

2000 film by Jean-Pierre Marois

- DVD cover
- Directed by: Jean-Pierre Marois
- Written by: Jean-Pierre Marois; Ira Israel
- Produced by: Mauel Munz
- Starring: Mena Suvari; Bob Hoskins; Robert Loggia
- Cinematography: Eagle Egilsson
- Edited by: Georges Klotz
- Distributed by: Lionsgate
- Release date: July 29, 1999 (Hungary)
- Running time: 88 minutes
- Countries: United States; France
- Language: English

American Virgin is a 1999 comedy film directed by Jean-Pierre Marois.

== Plot ==
Katrina Bartalotti is the daughter of Ronny, a Southern California adult film director, who desires his daughter to be wholesome and educated but she has other plans, desiring to lose her virginity by auctioning it online in order to spite her father by using the Live Virgin bodysuit innovated and promoted by Joey.

== Cast ==
- Mena Suvari as Katrina
- Robert Loggia as Ronny
- Bob Hoskins as Joey
- Sally Kellerman as Quaint McPerson
- Mark Adair-Rios as Male Security Guard
- Jason Bercy as Messenger
- Brian Bloom as Brad
- Octavia Spencer as Agnes Large
- Michael Cudlitz as Bob
- Freda Foh Shen as Marge
- Life Garland as Crip
- Penny Griego as Anchorwoman
- Elizabeth Guber as Operator
- Jim Czarnecki as Teacher
- Carrie Ann Inaba as Hiromi
- Ron Jeremy as Police Station Desk Sergeant
- Lamont Johnson as Nick
- Ira Israel as Ira
- Esai Morales as Jim the Director
- Gabriel Mann as Brian
- Jerry Waskiw as Jerry from Bois Ideal
- Patrick Goblensky as Pat Le Chest

== Production ==
The film's original working title was Live Virgin, but changed to American Virgin to capitalize on Suvari's previous successes in American Pie and American Beauty.

== Critical response ==
On Rotten Tomatoes the film has an approval rating of 29% based on reviews from 7 critics.

Michael Sauter of Entertainment Weekly gave it a grade F and called it "Damn near unwatchable."
