= Golden Osella =

Major award at the Venice Film Festival

- Osella d'oro (Italian)
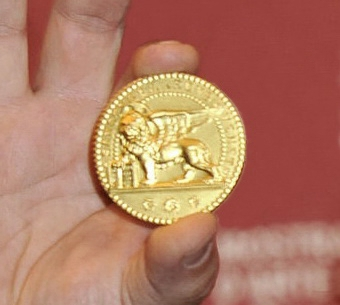
- Golden Osella presented to Silent Souls in 2010
- Country: Italy
- Presented by: Venice Film Festival
- First award: 1987
- Most recent winner: It Was the Son and Something in the Air (2012)
- Website: labiennale.org/en/cinema

The Golden Osella (Italian: Osella d'oro) is one of the oldest and most distinguished awards presented at the Venice Film Festival. Named after the historic osella—a commemorative medal given by the Doges of Venice to notable members of the Venetian Republic—the Golden Osella honors exceptional achievements in cinema, covering a spectrum of creative and technical contributions.

It was introduced in 1987 by the festival's organizing committee and was awarded irregularly until 2012. Daniele Ciprì and Olivier Assayas are the most recent winners for their respective works in It Was the Son and Something in the Air.

== History ==
The Golden Osella was first established in 1987 as part of the 44th Venice International Film Festival and was awarded for over two decades, making it one of the festival's most distinctive prizes. Since its inception, it has recognized excellence across a range of cinematic fields, including direction, screenplay, cinematography, production design, costume design, music score, and editing. It is inspired by the osella tradition dating back to the 15th century in the Venetian Republic, where the Doge would distribute these silver medallions to members of the Maggior Consiglio or other distinguished citizens. Each medallion bore unique engravings, often featuring the Doge's likeness or scenes from Venetian life, symbolizing the recipient's esteemed place in the city.

Over the decades, the official festival jury has selected Golden Osella recipients based on films in the main competition. The first winners were Luciano Ricceri, Nana Cecchi, Sten Holmberg, David Mamet, and Richard Robbins for their work in The Gold Rimmed Glasses, Hip Hip Hurrah!, House of Games, and Maurice, respectively. From 1999 to 2003, no Golden Osella was presented, although screenplay awards were given to One Hundred Steps (2000) and Y tu mamá también (2001), with technical awards going to Far from Heaven (2002) and Good Morning, Night (2003). It was reintroduced in 2004 with a Special Golden Osella presented to Studio Ghibli for Howl's Moving Castle, marking the only occasion that the award was given to a production studio. The Golden Osella was last given out in 2012. Starting from the following year, a screenplay award is presented in a traditional format as a metal lion, distinct from the osella.

As of 2012, Sooni Taraporevala, Cuca Canals, Paz Alicia Garciadiego, and Anne Fontaine are the only female screenwriters to have won the award for their respective works on Mississippi Masala, The Tit and the Moon, Dry Cleaning, and Deep Crimson. Additionally, Nana Cecchi, Dominique Auvray, Mónica Chirinos, Marisa Pecanins, and Sylvie Olivé have been honored for their outstanding technical contributions, specifically in The Gold Rimmed Glasses, No Fear, No Die, Deep Crimson and Mr. Nobody. Deep Crimson holds the distinction of being the only film to receive three awards, while The Gold Rimmed Glasses is the only other multiple winner, having claimed two awards.

Three Colours: Blue and Lust, Caution are the only films that have also won the festival's top prize, the Golden Lion.

== Winners ==
Year	English title	Original title	Recipient(s)	Ref.
1980s
1987	The Gold Rimmed Glasses	Gli occhiali d'oro	Luciano Ricceri ^{§}	
1987	The Gold Rimmed Glasses	Gli occhiali d'oro	Nana Cecchi ^{∞}	
1987	Hip Hip Hurrah!		Sten Holmberg ^{‡}	
1987	House of Games		David Mamet ^{✧}	
1987	Maurice		Richard Robbins ^{※}	
1988	The Black Monk	Чёрный монах	Vadim Yusov ^{‡}	
1988	Burning Secret		Bernd Lepel ^{§}	
1988	A Very Old Man with Enormous Wings	Un señor muy viejo con unas alas enormes	Pablo Milanés, Gianni Nocenzi and José María Vitier ^{※}	
1988	Women on the Verge of a Nervous Breakdown	Mujeres al borde de un ataque de nervios	Pedro Almodóvar ^{✧}	
1989	Australia		Giorgos Arvanitis ^{‡}	
1989	I Want to Go Home		Jules Feiffer ^{✧}	
1990s
1990	Boys on the Outside	Ragazzi fuori	Mauro Marchetti ^{‡}	
1990	No Fear, No Die	S'en fout la mort	Dominique Auvray ^{⁂}	
1990	The Only Witness	Edinstvenijat svidetel	Valeri Milovansky ^{※}	
1991	Germany Year 90 Nine Zero	Allemagne année 90 neuf zéro	Jean-Luc Godard ^{※}	
1991	Mississippi Masala		Sooni Taraporevala ^{✧}	
1991	Scream of Stone	Cerro Torre: Schrei aus Stein	Werner Herzog	
1993	1, 2, 3, Sun	Un, deux, trois, soleil	Khaled Hadj Ibrahim ^{※}	
1993	Three Colours: Blue	Trois couleurs: Bleu	Sławomir Idziak ^{‡}	
1994	Ashes of Time	東邪西毒	Christopher Doyle ^{‡}	
1994	Lamerica		Gianni Amelio ^{✶}	
1994	The Tit and the Moon	La Teta y la luna	Bigas Luna and Cuca Canals ^{✧}	
1995	Det Means Girl	Det Yani Dokhtar	Abolfazl Jalili	
1995	In the Bleak Midwinter		Kenneth Branagh ^{✶}	
1995	Maborosi	幻の光	Masao Nakabori ^{‡}	
1996	Deep Crimson	Profundo Carmesí	Mónica Chirinos and Marisa Pecanins ^{§}	
1996	Deep Crimson	Profundo Carmesí	Paz Alicia Garciadiego ^{✧}	
1996	Deep Crimson	Profundo Carmesí	David Mansfield ^{※}	
1997	Chinese Box		Graeme Revell ^{※}	
1997	Dry Cleaning	Nettoyage à sec	Anne Fontaine and Gilles Taurand ^{✧}	
1997	Ossos		Emmanuel Machuel ^{‡}	
1998	Autumn Tale	Conte d'automne	Éric Rohmer ^{✧}	
1998	The Cloud	La nube	Gerardo Gandini ^{※}	
1998	Shooting the Moon	L'albero delle pere	Luca Bigazzi ^{‡}	
2000s
2004	Howl's Moving Castle	ハウルの動く城	Studio Ghibli	
2005	Good Night, and Good Luck		George Clooney and Grant Heslov ^{✧}	
2005	Regular Lovers	Les Amants réguliers	William Lubtchansky ^{‡}	
2006	Children of Men		Emmanuel Lubezki ^{‡}	
2006	The Queen		Peter Morgan ^{✧}	
2007	It's a Free World...		Paul Laverty ^{✧}	
2007	Lust, Caution	色，戒	Rodrigo Prieto ^{‡}	
2008	Paper Soldier	Бумажный солдат	Maksim Drozdov and Alisher Khamidkhodzhaev ^{‡}	
2008	Teza		Haile Gerima ^{✧}	
2009	Life During Wartime		Todd Solondz ^{✧}	
2009	Mr. Nobody		Sylvie Olivé ^{§}	
2010s
2010	The Last Circus	Balada triste de trompeta	Álex de la Iglesia ^{✧}	
2010	Silent Souls	Овсянки	Mikhail Krichman ^{‡}	
2011	Alps	Άλπεις	Yorgos Lanthimos and Efthymis Filippou ^{✧}	
2011	Wuthering Heights		Robbie Ryan ^{‡}	
2012	It Was the Son	È stato il figlio	Daniele Ciprì ^{‡}	
2012	Something in the Air	Après mai	Olivier Assayas ^{✧}	

Notes
^{✶} indicates work in direction
^{✧} indicates work in screenplay
^{‡} indicates work in cinematography
^{§} indicates work in production design
^{∞} indicates work in costume design
^{※} indicates work in music score
^{⁂} indicates work in editing
