= I Come with the Rain =

I Come With The Rain
- Film Poster
- Directed by: Tran Anh Hung
- Written by: Tran Anh Hung
- Produced by: Fernando Sulichin; Jean Cazès; Jean-Pierre Marois
- Starring: Josh Hartnett; Elias Koteas; Lee Byung-hun; Takuya Kimura; Shawn Yue; Trần Nữ Yên Khê
- Cinematography: Juan Ruiz Anchía
- Edited by: Mario Battistel
- Music by: Gustavo Santaolalla; Radiohead
- Production company: Central Films
- Distributed by: TF1 International
- Release date: 27 May 2009 (Tokyo)
- Running time: 114 minutes
- Country: France
- Language: English
- Budget: $18,000,000
- Box office: $4,747,795

I Come with the Rain is a 2009 neo-noir thriller written and directed by Vietnamese-born French director Tran Anh Hung, starring American actor Josh Hartnett.

After making three movies about Vietnam, Hung intended to make a baroque action film, a passionate thriller, both intense and poetic, haunted by three characters from the mythology of film and the Western world: the serial killer, the private investigator, and the Christ figure.

The film takes place in Los Angeles, Mindanao and Hong Kong and brings together American and Asian actors.

The film score was written by the Argentine Academy Award winner Gustavo Santaolalla and the English alternative rock band Radiohead. The film also made heavy use of post-rock music, including songs by Explosions in the Sky, Godspeed You! Black Emperor, and A Silver Mt. Zion.

The film premiered in Tokyo at Toho Cinemas Roppongi Hills on 27 May 2009.

== Synopsis ==
Two years after killing Hasford, a serial killer, in the line of duty, Kline now works as a private detective, but he is still haunted by the ghosts of his past. A powerful pharmaceutical conglomerate boss hires Kline to find his only son Shitao who has mysteriously disappeared in the Philippines where he had been helping in an orphanage.

Kline follows the trail left by the ethereal Shitao to the jungles of Mindanao, and then to the urban jungle of Hong Kong, where he enlists the help of Meng Zi, an old police officer friend. The search leads Kline to cross paths with local organized crime syndicate boss Su Dongpo, who is making trouble for the underworld, triggered by an overriding passion for his drug-addicted girlfriend Lili.

Caught in the crossfire between the Hong Kong police and Su Dongpo's mafia drug ring which is also hunting for Shitao, Kline finds himself alone, in this unknown city, when Meng Zi is victim of an assassination attempt and is hospitalised.

Leaving behind his 5-star hotel for a shabby murder scene apartment in order to get inside the mind of Shitao, Kline gradually loses himself in the terrifying memories of Hasford, whose speciality was dissecting his victims' limbs while they were still alive, then reassembling them into installation sculptures.

After a few weeks immersed in his haunted memories, torn between good and evil, Kline is about to leave Hong Kong when he finds Shitao, who has become a mysterious vagrant with healing powers.

== Cast ==
=== Main cast ===
- Josh Hartnett as Kline
- Elias Koteas as Hasford
- Lee Byung-hun as Su Dongpo
- Takuya Kimura as Shitao
- Shawn Yue as Meng Zi
- Trần Nữ Yên Khê as Lili

=== Supporting cast ===
- Eusebio Poncela as Vargas
- Sam Lee as The Monk Artist
- Carl Ng as The Dead Sack Man
- William Chow Tze Ho as Mi Fu
- Bo-yuan Chan as Dai Xi
- Jo Kuk as The 9mm Lover
- David Tang as Wang Wei
- Thea Aquino as The Erotic Dancer
- Alvaro Longoria as The Psychiatrist
- Benito Sagredo as The Male Nurse

== Festival screenings ==
6th Fresh Film Fest

Section: Contemporary World Cinema
Location: Karlovy Vary, Czech Republic
Screening dates: 13-15 August 2009

14th Busan International Film Festival

Section: Gala Presentation
Location: Busan, South Korea
Screening dates: 9-15 October 2009

15th Lund International Fantastic Film Festival

Section: International Competition (nominated: The Siren Best Film)
Location: Lund, Sweden
Screening date: 19 September 2009

3rd Empire Open Cinema

Section: Selection
Location: Moscow, Russia
Screening dates: 2 September 2010
