= The Scent of Green Papaya =

- Directed by: Tran Anh Hung
- Written by: Tran Anh Hung
- Produced by: Christophe Rossignon
- Cinematography: Benoît Delhomme
- Edited by: Nicole Dedieu; Jean-Pierre Roques
- Music by: Tôn-Thât Tiêt
- Distributed by: Président Films
- Release date: 8 June 1993
- Running time: 104 minutes
- Countries: France; Vietnam
- Language: Vietnamese
- Box office: $1,700,992

The Scent of Green Papaya (Vietnamese: Mùi đu đủ xanh, French: L'Odeur de la papaye verte) is a 1993 Vietnamese-French drama film written and directed by Vietnamese-French director Tran Anh Hung, and starring Tran Nu Yên-Khê, Man San Lu, and Thi Loc Truong.

The film won the Caméra d'Or prize at the 1993 Cannes Film Festival, a César Award for Best Debut at the French annual film award ceremony, and was nominated for the 1993 Academy Award for Best Foreign Language Film. It was Tran Anh Hung's first feature film and stars his wife, Tran Nu Yên-Khê. It is also his first collaboration with Vietnamese composer Tôn-Thât Tiêt, who subsequently wrote the music for two more films: Cyclo and Vertical Ray of the Sun.

Although set in Vietnam, the film was shot entirely on a soundstage in Bry-sur-Marne, France.

== Plot ==
A young girl, Mùi, becomes a servant for a family in pre-unification (1951) Saigon that was once wealthy but is sinking into genteel poverty due to the husband's infidelities and spending sprees. Their only income is from the wife's small fabric/textile shop. The husband's widowed mother, an invalid who seldom leaves her upstairs room, blames her daughter-in-law, telling her, "You have a man, but you don't know how to keep him happy." The eldest son prefers his friend's company, the bookish middle son torments insects, and the youngest - who idolizes his father - is willful, disruptive, and resentful. Mùi is notably peaceful and intensely curious about the world. Having lost a young daughter during one of her husband's earlier absences, the wife is kind to Mùi, treating her like one of her own.

When the husband leaves for his fourth and final time, he steals his wife's meagre savings and jewelry. He stays away long enough for the family to almost run out of food and go hungry. He returns with some of the jewelry he took, but collapses soon after his return home; the wife sells an heirloom vase and other valuables in anticipation of imminent medical expenses, and a doctor is summoned. As he is treated with acupuncture, musicians play cheerful music outside the room. When he dies, the wife faints, and the family is shocked.

Ten years later, the family has fallen on hard times. Two sons have left, and the wife has taken the place of the grandmother upstairs, tragic and rarely seen. On the family shrine, the grandmother's and husband's photos have joined those of other departed relatives. It is determined that the household can no longer afford to keep Mùi. The heartbroken wife gives Mùi a silk dress and some gold jewelry, and Mùi becomes a servant for the older son's wealthy friend, who is now a concert pianist. He is engaged to be married but seems to prefer playing the piano to spending time with his frivolous fiancée.

One night, as the fiancée chatters on, his piano playing becomes more stormy as he strives to ignore her. She leaves but watches through the window and sees that when Mùi enters the room, his playing becomes both passionate and peaceful. Later that night, he goes to Mùi's quarters and closes the door behind him. When the fiancée learns of this, she furiously slaps Mùi, smashes some of his belongings, and then leaves her engagement ring on a table. When he returns, he calmly pockets the ring. He starts teaching Mùi to read and write. In the final scene, a visibly pregnant Mùi is reading poetry to him and smiles.

== Cast ==
- Tran Nu Yên-Khê as Mui, age 20 (as Trân Nu Yên-Khê)
- Man San Lu as Mui, age 10
- Thi Loc Truong as the mother (as Truong Thi Lôc)
- Anh Hoa Nguyen as the older Ti (as Nguyên 'Anh Hoa)
- Hoa Hoi Vuong as Khuyen (as Vuong Hòa Hôi)
- Ngoc Trung Tran as the father
- Vantha Talisman as Thu
- Keo Souvannavong as Trung
- Van Oanh Nguyen as Mr. Thuan
- Gerard Neth as Tin
- Nhat Do as Lam
- Thi Hai Vo as the grandmother
- Thi Thanh Tra Nguyen as Mai
- Lam Huy Bui as the doctor
- Xuan Thu Nguyen as the antique dealer
- Xuan Loi Phan as Musician
- Xuan Dung Phan as Musician
- Van Chung Le as Musicien
- Tho Phuong as Barber
- Long Chau as Client
- Thi Van Khanh Truong as Client
- Hông Hanh Luguern as Client
- Ba Hung Phan as the water delivery man

== Production ==
Produced by French production company Les Productions Lazennec, the film is the debut feature film of Vietnamese-born French director Tran Anh Hung. Tran traveled to Vietnam for the first time in 16 years while the film was being prepared, making several trips to Ho Chi Minh City with his French producer Christophe Rossington. They originally planned to shoot the film on location in Vietnam. However, as filming in Vietnam proved to be too cumbersome, this plan was scrapped and the film was made in a studio in France instead. They reconstructed downtown Saigon at the studios of Bry-sur-Marne.

The cast consisted mostly of amateurs, found through a lengthy casting process. Except for the old servant who they brought from Vietnam, all the actors were from France. Some of them had hardly any knowledge of Vietnamese or spoke different dialects. The actress who played Mùi, Tran Nu Yên-Khê, is the director's wife.

== Reception ==
=== Year-end lists ===
- 4th – Bob Strauss, Los Angeles Daily News
- 4th – David Elliott, The San Diego Union-Tribune

=== Awards and nominations ===
- 1993 Cannes Film Festival Award of the Youth French Film (Anh Hung Tran) Won
- 1993 Cannes Film Festival Golden Camera Award (Anh Hung Tran) Won
- 1993 Camerimage Golden Frog Award Nomination (Benoît Delhomme)
- 1994 Academy Award Nomination for Best Foreign Language Film
- 1994 British Film Institute Award Sutherland Trophy (Anh Hung Tran) Won
- 1994 César Award for Best First Work (Anh Hung Tran) Won

== See also ==
- List of submissions to the 66th Academy Awards for Best Foreign Language Film
- List of Vietnamese submissions for the Academy Award for Best Foreign Language Film
