= The Vertical Ray of the Sun =

- French theatrical release Poster
- Directed by: Tran Anh Hung
- Written by: Tran Anh Hung
- Produced by: Christophe Rossignon
- Starring: Tran Nu Yên-Khê; Nguyen Nhu Quynh; Le Khanh
- Cinematography: Mark Lee Ping Bin
- Edited by: Mario Battistel
- Music by: Tôn-Thất Tiết; Trịnh Công Sơn
- Distributed by: Mars Distribution (France)
- Release date: May 18, 2000 (Cannes)
- Running time: 112 minutes
- Countries: France; Germany; Vietnam
- Language: Vietnamese

The Vertical Ray of the Sun (Vietnamese: Mùa hè chiều thẳng đứng, French: À la verticale de l'été) is the third feature film by Vietnamese-born French director Trần Anh Hùng. It was released in 2000 and is the final part of what many now consider to be Tran's "Vietnam trilogy."

The film centres on three sisters who live in present-day Hanoi: Suong is the eldest, then Khanh in the middle, and Lien is the youngest. The film takes place over the course of one month, starting on the anniversary of their mother's death and ending on the anniversary of their father's. Tran was inspired to make the film after visiting Hanoi during a break in the filming of Cyclo during the Christmas holidays in 1994.

This drama was lensed in Vietnam's capital, Hanoi, as well as in Hạ Long Bay and the village of Luoi Ngoc, Quảng Ninh Province.

The film's original score is composed by Tôn-Thất Tiết. Additionally, three songs of the noted Vietnamese songwriter Trịnh Công Sơn are interspersed through the film, as are songs by The Velvet Underground, Lou Reed, Arab Strap, and The Married Monk.

The Vertical Ray of the Sun was screened in the Un Certain Regard section at the 2000 Cannes Film Festival.

== Plot ==
On the anniversary of their mother's death, three sisters in contemporary Hanoi meet to prepare a memorial banquet. After the banquet, the calm exteriors of the sisters' lives begin to give way to more turbulent truths, which will affect their seemingly idyllic relationships. The eldest sister has a small boy nicknamed Little Mouse, and botanical photographer husband Quoc, who is prone to long absences from home. The middle sister has recently discovered that she is pregnant to her husband Kien, who is a writer suffering from writer's block. The flirtatious youngest sister constantly fantasises about being pregnant, and lives with her brother Hai, for whom she has a deep affection.

== Cast ==
- Tran Nu Yen Khe as Lien (Liên)
- Nguyễn Như Quỳnh as Suong (Sương)
- Le Khanh as Khanh (Khanh)
- Ngo Quang Hai as Hai (Hải)
- Chu Hung as Quoc (Quốc)
- Tran Manh Cuong as Kien (Kiên)
- Le Tuan Anh as Tuan (Tuấn)
- Le Ngoc Dung as Huong (Hương)
- Do Thi Hai Yen as Quoc's concubine

== Alternate titles ==
Vietnamese: Mùa hè chiều thẳng đứng

UK title: At the Height of Summer
