= The Taste of Things =

2023 French historical romantic drama film

- Theatrical release poster
- French: La Passion de Dodin Bouffant
- Literally: The Passion of Dodin Bouffant
- Directed by: Trần Anh Hùng
- Written by: Trần Anh Hùng
- Produced by: Olivier Delbosc
- Starring: Juliette Binoche; Benoît Magimel
- Cinematography: Jonathan Ricquebourg
- Edited by: Mario Battistel
- Production companies: Curiosa Films; Gaumont; France 2 Cinéma; Umedia
- Distributed by: Gaumont
- Release dates: 24 May 2023 (Cannes); 8 November 2023 (France)
- Running time: 134 minutes
- Country: France
- Language: French
- Box office: $10.5 million

The Taste of Things (French: La Passion de Dodin Bouffant, lit. 'The Passion of Dodin Bouffant'), previously titled The Pot-au-Feu, is a 2023 French historical romantic drama film written and directed by Trần Anh Hùng, starring Juliette Binoche and Benoît Magimel.

Set in 1889, it depicts a romance between a cook and the gourmet she works for. The character of the gourmet is based on Dodin-Bouffant, created by Swiss author Marcel Rouff in his 1924 novel La Vie et la passion de Dodin-Bouffant, gourmet (The Passionate Epicure).

The film premiered in the main competition of the 76th Cannes Film Festival on 24 May 2023, where Hùng won the Best Director award. It was released in France on 8 November 2023. It was chosen as the French entry for Best International Feature Film at the 96th Academy Awards, but was not nominated.

== Plot ==
On a country estate in France in 1889, Eugénie works as a cook for Dodin, a gourmet who delights in her cooking. Eugénie and Dodin, along with her assistant Violette and Violette's young niece Pauline, who is visiting for the day, prepare an intricate meal for Dodin's friends. The group meets regularly to eat and enjoy food and praise Eugénie for her artistry. Their appreciation for her cooking is contrasted with their disappointment in a garish and discordant eight-hour meal prepared by a visiting prince's chef to which they are invited.

Eugénie and Dodin, both middle-aged, are in a long-term romantic relationship, but maintain separate bedrooms; he has asked her to marry him several times, but she declines, preferring that they maintain their relationship as they are. They find joy in developing new recipes and preparations together. Eugénie suggests to the parents of Pauline, who has considerable gastronomic talent for a child, that she train Pauline as a cook, but they demur. Dodin plans to invite the prince to a meal for which he will prepare a menu revolving around a classic, yet simple, dish, the pot-au-feu.

Eugénie experiences several fainting spells, and Dodin grows worried about her health. His doctor friend, Rabaz, is unable to determine the cause, and Eugénie persistently claims she is fine. After one such episode, Dodin cooks an intricate meal for her with great dedication and concludes with an engagement ring hidden in a dessert. She finally accepts Dodin's proposal, and they plan to marry in the "autumn of their lives". However, one morning, Dodin wakes to find that Eugénie has died in her sleep.

Dodin mourns Eugénie and becomes melancholic, refusing to eat. Pauline's parents arrive to inform him that Pauline, also affected by the death of Eugénie, is intent on learning from him, but he refuses. When his friends secretly send a cook to prepare him an omelette that Eugénie had often made him, he sends the cook away in fury. Eventually, he begins interviewing cooks to work for him and prepare the prince's menu, assisted by Pauline. After several unsuccessful interviews, one of his friends brings him a dish made by a cook working nearby. Excited, Dodin and his friend go to meet the cook, bringing Pauline along. In a flashback, Eugénie and Dodin discuss their relationship, and she asks if she is his cook or his wife. He replies that she is his cook, to her satisfaction.

== Cast ==
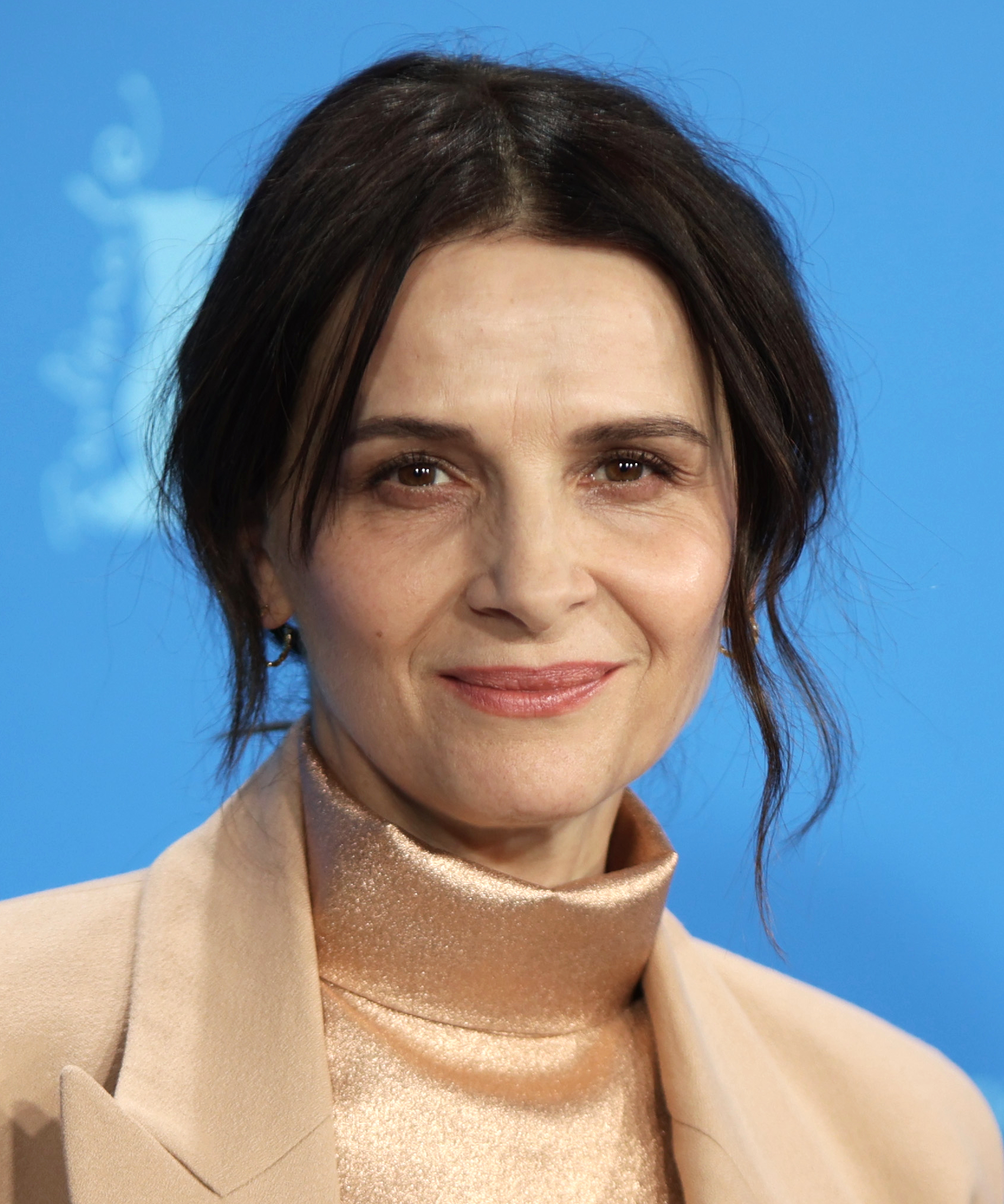
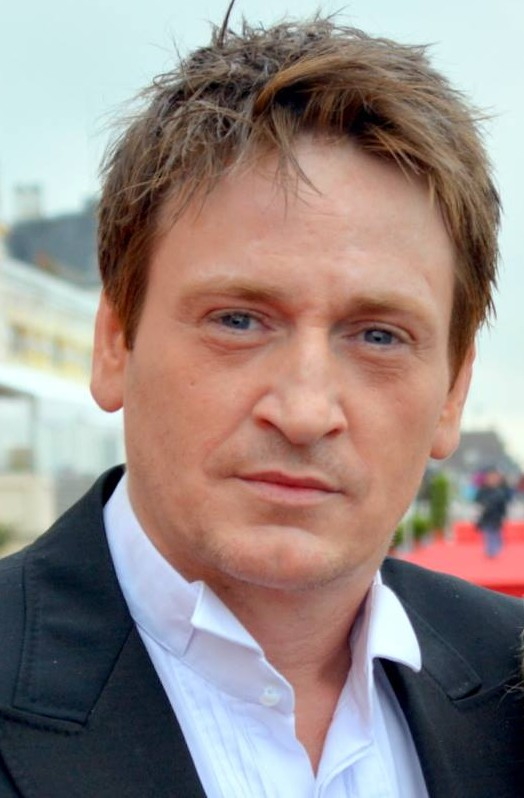
Juliette Binoche, 2022 (left) and Benoit Magimel, 2015 (right)
- Juliette Binoche as Eugénie
- Benoît Magimel as Dodin Bouffant
- Emmanuel Salinger as Rabaz
- Patrick d'Assumçao as Grimaud
- Galatea Bellugi as Violette
- Jan Hammenecker as Magot
- Frédéric Fisbach as Beaubois
- Bonnie Chagneau-Ravoire as Pauline
- Jean-Marc Roulot as Augustin
- Yannik Landrein as Pauline's father
- Sarah Adler as Pauline's mother

== Production ==
The film was shot primarily at the Château du Raguin in Chazé-sur-Argos, Maine-et-Loire, in April and May 2022. French chef Pierre Gagnaire served as culinary director while also appearing in the film in the small role of the visiting prince's chef. Co-stars Juliette Binoche and Benoit Magimel were partners from 1998 to 2003 and have a daughter together.

== Release ==
The film was selected to compete for the Palme d'Or at the 2023 Cannes Film Festival, where it had its world premiere on 24 May 2023. It was also invited at the 28th Busan International Film Festival in 'Icon' section and was screened on 6 October 2023.

It was theatrically released in France by Gaumont on 8 November 2023. IFC Films and Sapan Studio jointly acquired the U.S. distribution rights and gave the film a limited theatrical release on 9 February 2024, before expanding wide on 14 February.

== Reception ==
=== Critical response ===
On Rotten Tomatoes, 97% of 192 critic reviews are positive, with an average rating of 8.4/10. The website's critics consensus reads, "As epicurean as French haute cuisine, The Taste of Things indulges our palates with an exquisite seven-course love story for the soul." On Metacritic, it has a weighted average score of 85 out of 100, based on 43 critic reviews, indicating "universal acclaim". On AlloCiné, the film received an average rating of 3.1 out of 5 stars, based on 33 reviews from French critics.

Vanity Fair reported that the film received critical acclaim. The New York Times described the film as having "elements of joy and sorrow, humor and intensity, beauty and light and shadow combine in a perfectly balanced experience". RogerEbert.com remarked that the film "achieved...a delicate balance" that "feels like a magic trick".

The film was selected as the French entry for Best International Feature Film at the 96th Academy Awards, and made the 15-film shortlist.

In June 2025, IndieWire ranked the film at number 33 on its list of "The 100 Best Movies of the 2020s (So Far)."

=== Accolades ===
Award	Date of ceremony	Category	Recipient(s)	Result	Ref.
Academy Awards	10 March 2024	Best International Feature Film	The Taste of Things	Shortlisted	
AARP Movies for Grownups Awards	17 January 2024	Best Actress	Juliette Binoche	Nominated	
AARP Movies for Grownups Awards	17 January 2024	Best Foreign Language Film	The Taste of Things	Nominated	
Astra Film Awards	6 January 2024	Best International Actress	Juliette Binoche	Nominated	
Astra Film Awards	6 January 2024	Best International Feature	The Taste of Things	Nominated	
Astra Film Awards	6 January 2024	Best International Filmmaker	Trần Anh Hùng	Nominated	
Boston Society of Film Critics	10 December 2023	Best Cinematography	Jonathan Ricquebourg	Won	
Cannes Film Festival	27 May 2023	Palme d'Or	Trần Anh Hùng	Nominated	
Cannes Film Festival	27 May 2023	Best Director	Trần Anh Hùng	Won	
César Awards	23 February 2024	Best Costume Design	Tran Nu Yên Khé	Nominated	
César Awards	23 February 2024	Best Production Design	Toma Baquéni	Nominated	
César Awards	23 February 2024	Best Cinematography	Jonathan Ricquebourg	Nominated	
Critics' Choice Movie Awards	14 January 2024	Best Foreign Language Film	The Taste of Things	Nominated	
Dallas–Fort Worth Film Critics Association	18 December 2023	Best Foreign Language Film	The Taste of Things	3rd Place	
Denver Film Critics Society	12 January 2024	Best Non-English Language Feature	The Taste of Things	Nominated	
Georgia Film Critics Association	5 January 2024	Best International Film	The Taste of Things	Nominated	
Gotham Awards	27 November 2023	Outstanding Supporting Performance	Juliette Binoche	Nominated	
IndieWire Critics Poll	11 December 2023	Best International Film	The Taste of Things	6th Place	
Lumière Awards	22 January 2024	Best Cinematography	Jonathan Ricquebourg	Won	
Mill Valley Film Festival	16 October 2023	Audience Award – World Cinema	The Taste of Things	Won	
Miskolc International Film Festival	9 September 2023	Emeric Pressburger Prize for Best Feature Film	The Taste of Things	Nominated	
Montclair Film Festival	20 October 2023	Audience Award – World Cinema	The Taste of Things	Won	
North Texas Film Critics Association	18 December 2023	Best Foreign Language Film	The Taste of Things	Nominated	
Palm Springs International Film Festival	15 January 2024	Best International Feature Film	The Taste of Things	Nominated	
San Francisco Bay Area Film Critics Circle	9 January 2024	Best International Feature Film	The Taste of Things	Nominated	
San Sebastián International Film Festival	30 September 2023	Culinary Zinema Best Film Award	The Taste of Things	Won	
Satellite Awards	18 February 2024	Best Actress in a Supporting Role	Juliette Binoche	Nominated	
Washington D.C. Area Film Critics Association	10 December 2023	Best Foreign Language Film	The Taste of Things	Nominated	

== See also ==
- List of submissions to the 96th Academy Awards for Best International Feature Film
- List of French submissions for the Academy Award for Best International Feature Film
