= Abolfazl Jalili =

Iranian film director and screenwriter (born 1957)

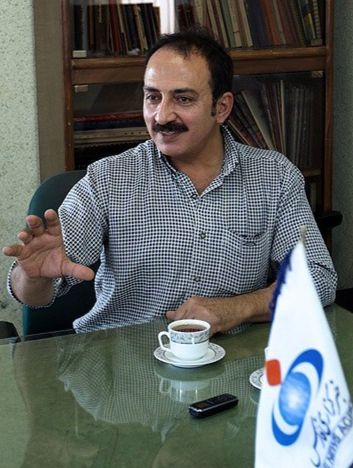
- Born: Abolfazl Jalili; Saveh, Iran

Abolfazl Jalili (Persian: ابوالفضل جلیلی, born 1957 in Saveh, Iran) is an Iranian film director and screenwriter. He belongs to the Iranian new wave movement.

Jalili studied directing at the Iranian College of Dramatic Arts, then worked for national television (IRIB), where he produced several children's films. His film "Det Means Girl" (1994) won prizes at the Venice Film Festival and Nantes. He was one of Rotterdam's Film Makers in Focus in 1999.

== Filmography ==
- 1983 Milad
- 1985 Spring
- 1987 Scabies
- 1995 Det Means Girl
- 1996 A True Story
- 1992-1998 Dance of Dust
- 1998 Don
- 1999 Tales of Kish (The Ring)
- 2001 Delbaran
- 2003 Abjad
- 2005 Full or Empty
- 2007 Hafez (Iran-Japan / 35 mm / colour / 98min.)

== Representative awards and honors ==
- Golden Montgolfiere, Nantes Three Continents Festival, 2001.
- Golden Palm, nominated, 1999 Cannes Film Festival.
- Don Quixote Award, Locarno International Film Festival, 1999.
- Silver Leopard, 51st Locarno International Film Festival, 1998.
- Solidarity Prize, San Sebastián International Film Festival, 1998.
- Golden Montgolfiere, Nantes Three Continents Festival, 1996.
- Golden Osella, Venice Film Festival, 1995.
- Golden Lion, nominated, Venice Film Festival, 1991.
