= Hossein Saki =

Iranian footballer (born 1997)

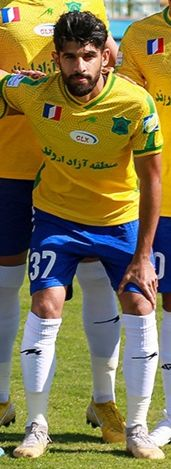

Personal information
- Date of birth: 10 May 1997 (age 29)
- Place of birth: Dasht-e Azadegan, Iran
- Height: 1.76 m (5 ft 9 in)
- Position: Left-back

Team information
- Current team: Fajr Sepasi
- Number: 37

Youth career
- Foolad

Senior career*
| Years | Team | Apps | (Gls) |
| 2014–2015 | Foolad B | | |
| 2015–2016 | Esteghlal Ahvaz | 17 | (0) |
| 2016–2023 | Sanat Naft Abadan | 122 | (0) |
| 2023–2024 | Esteghlal Khuzestan | 27 | (0) |
| 2024– | Fajr Sepasi | 13 | (0) |

International career^{‡}
| 2016 | Iran U19 | 2 | (0) |
| 2017 | Iran U20 | 1 | (0) |
| 2018–2019 | Iran U23 | 5 | (0) |
- * Club domestic league appearances and goals as of 21 April 2025 ‡ National team caps and goals as of 26 March 2019

Hossein Saki (Persian: حسین ساکی; born 10 May 1997) is an Iranian football left-back who plays for Fajr Sepasi in the Azadegan League.
