= Jean-Pierre Marois =

French film director and producer

- Born: Jean-Pierre Marois; France

Jean-Pierre Marois is a French film director and producer. He is most noted for directing the film American Virgin (1999) and as co-producer of the film Mary (2005).

== Filmography ==
- Save the Rabbits (1994) (co-producer)
- American Virgin (1999) (director & executive producer)
- Mary (2005) (co-producer)
- South of the Border (2009) (associate producer)
- I Come with the Rain (2009) (executive producer)
- Pericle il Nero (2011) (co-producer)
