= Tran Nu Yen Khe =

French-Vietnamese actress

Trần Nữ Yên Khê
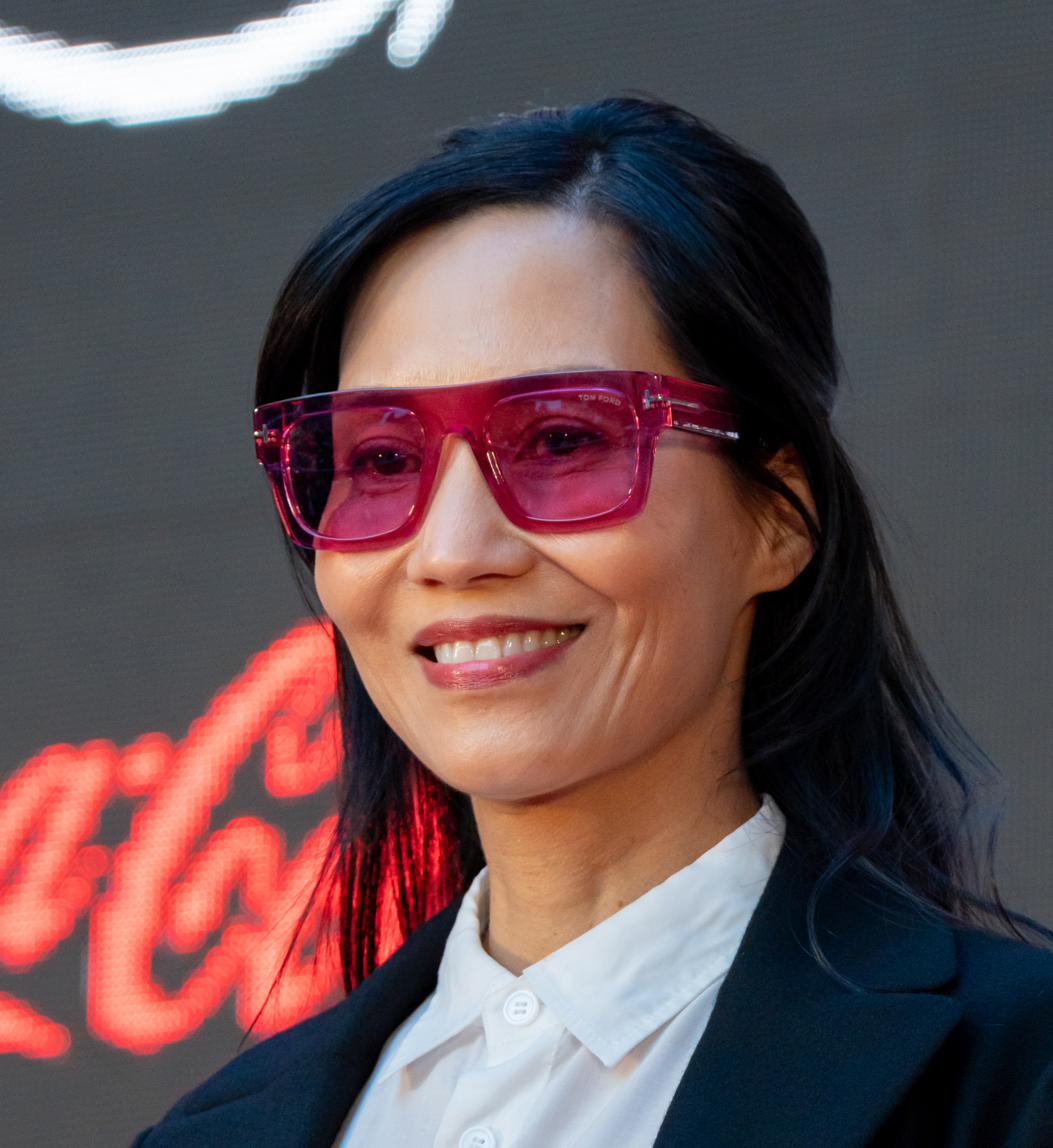
- Trần Nữ Yên Khê in 2023
- Born: March 18, 1968 (age 58); Hanoi, North Vietnam
- Occupation: Actress
- Spouse: Tran Anh Hung

Trần Nữ Yên Khê (born March 18, 1968) is a Vietnamese-born French actress married to the director Tran Anh Hung. She has appeared in most of his films, notably The Scent of Green Papaya and Cyclo.

== Early life and education ==
Trần Nữ Yên Khê was born on March 18, 1968 in Hanoi, North Vietnam. Her mother had been a professor of literature and Chinese at Huế University.

Trần left Vietnam in 1974 at the age of six with her mother and sisters before the end of the Vietnam War. She grew up in Paris. After high school, she attended École du Louvre for one year, before enrolling at École Camondo, where she studied design and interior architecture.

Although Trần is from the central region of Vietnam, she speaks Vietnamese with a northern accent, which she has said discontented her mother.

She has alleged, "French people only offer me stereotypical roles of Asian women that men fantasise about".

== Partial filmography ==
- The Scent of Green Papaya (1993)
- Cyclo (1995)
- The Vertical Ray of the Sun (2000)
- I Come with the Rain (2009)
- The Third Wife (2018)
