= Cyclo (film) =

- Theatrical release poster
- Directed by: Trần Anh Hùng
- Written by: Tran Anh Hung
- Produced by: Christophe Rossignon
- Starring: Tony Leung Chiu Wai; Lê Văn Lộc; Trần Nữ Yên Khê
- Cinematography: Benoît Delhomme; Laurence Trémolet
- Music by: Tôn-Thât Tiêt
- Distributed by: New Yorker Video (Region 1 DVD); Gaumont (Region 2 DVD)
- Release dates: September 1995 (Venice); 22 March 1996 (UK)
- Running time: 123 minutes
- Countries: Vietnam; France
- Language: Vietnamese

Cyclo (Vietnamese: Xích Lô [sɨt̚˦˥ lo˧˧]) is a 1995 film by Tran Anh Hung. It stars Lê Văn Lộc, Tony Leung Chiu Wai and Trần Nữ Yên Khê. The film depicts the difficult lives of the labor force in early 1990s Ho Chi Minh City, and how people fall under the influence of crime.

The film is considered hard to understand because of abstract and wordless communication. However, in a review, Janet Maslin asserted that this style, which is typical of the director, made the movie more memorable and successful. The film won the Golden Lion at the 52nd Venice International Film Festival.

== Plot ==
The film follows an 18-year-old whose cyclo-driver father is killed in a collision with a truck. Although his father hoped he would have a better life, poverty forces the young man to take over his job, pedalling a cyclo taxi through the streets of Ho Chi Minh City. He lives with his ageing grandfather, who repairs tyres despite poor health, his younger sister, who shines shoes, and his older sister, who carries water at a market.

Their modest but stable existence is disrupted when the cyclo is stolen by a gang. Unable to repay his employer, the Lady, for the loss, the young man is drawn into a criminal organisation led by a brooding gang leader known as the Poet.

Meanwhile, his older sister falls under the Poet’s influence and becomes a prostitute. The two develop feelings for one another, but when she visits his home, the Poet is beaten by his father, who is enraged by his son’s criminal lifestyle. Seeking to join the gang, the cyclo driver is introduced by the Poet to “Mr. Lullaby”, a killer who calmly slits a victim’s throat while singing.

As gang warfare engulfs Ho Chi Minh City, the cyclo driver takes revenge on the gang responsible for stealing his vehicle, blinding its leader in one eye. He later attempts to repay part of his debt to the Lady, but she dismisses him while attending to her mentally disabled son, who has covered himself in yellow paint.

The Poet eventually assigns the cyclo driver to assassinate a man. Two accomplices provide him with a gun, instruct him in how to carry out the killing, and give him pills to calm his nerves, warning him not to take too many. Around the same time, the Poet and the young man’s sister revisit his childhood home. Later, he leaves her with a client at a nightclub, where she is abused. When the client offers him money in compensation, the Poet kills him. On New Year’s Eve, consumed by despair, the Poet sets fire to his room and dies by suicide.

At the same time, the Lady’s son is fatally struck by a fire truck responding to the blaze. The cyclo driver becomes drunk and takes two of the pills, causing severe hallucinations. Unable to carry out the assassination, he covers himself in blue paint and accidentally shoots himself twice. The following morning, on Vietnamese New Year’s Day, gang members find him gravely wounded. The Lady spares him despite his failure, seeing in him a reminder of her deceased son, and releases him from the gang.

The film ends with the cyclo driver reflecting on his father’s memory as he rides his cyclo through a crowded street with his grandfather and sisters.

== Cast ==
- Lê Văn Lộc as the cyclo driver
- Tony Leung Chiu Wai as the Poet
- Trần Nữ Yên Khê as the elder sister of the cyclo driver
- Nguyen Nhu Quynh as the lady of the cyclo business

== Soundtrack ==
The film's soundtrack was written by Vietnamese composer Tôn-Thât Tiêt, who also collaborated with Trần Anh Hùng on The Scent of Green Papaya. The score received the "Best Music" award for at the Festival International de Flandre in 1995. The soundtrack also contains several well-known Vietnamese ca dao (folk songs) and other popular songs:

- "Nắng Chiều" - Sung and played by handicapped street performers.
- "Ru Con (Lullaby)" sung by Lullaby Man.
- "Thằng Bờm (Little Bờm)" - Sung by Sad Woman to Crazy Son.
- "Em ơi, Hà Nội phố" - Sung by Thanh Lam (the lounge singer).
- "Creep" by Radiohead - Playing in dance club.

== Reception ==
=== Critical response ===
On the review aggregator website Rotten Tomatoes, the film holds an approval rating of 75% based on 12 reviews, with an average rating of 6.8/10. Metacritic, which uses a weighted average, assigned the film a score of 76 out of 100, based on 15 critics, indicating "generally favorable" reviews.

=== Awards ===
Awards and nominations for Cyclo
Award	Date of ceremony	Category	Recipient(s)	Result	Ref.
Film Fest Gent	October 10–21, 1995	Georges Delerue Prize	Tôn-Thất Tiết	Won	
Film Fest Gent	October 10–21, 1995	Grand Prix for Best Film	Trần Anh Hùng	Won	
Venice Film Festival	August 30–September 9, 1995	Golden Lion	Trần Anh Hùng	Won	
Venice Film Festival	August 30–September 9, 1995	Fipresci Award	Trần Anh Hùng	Won	

== See also ==
- Bicycle Thieves, 1948 Italian film about a poor working class man searching for his stolen bicycle.
