= Tran Anh Hung =

Vietnamese-French filmmaker

Trần Anh Hùng
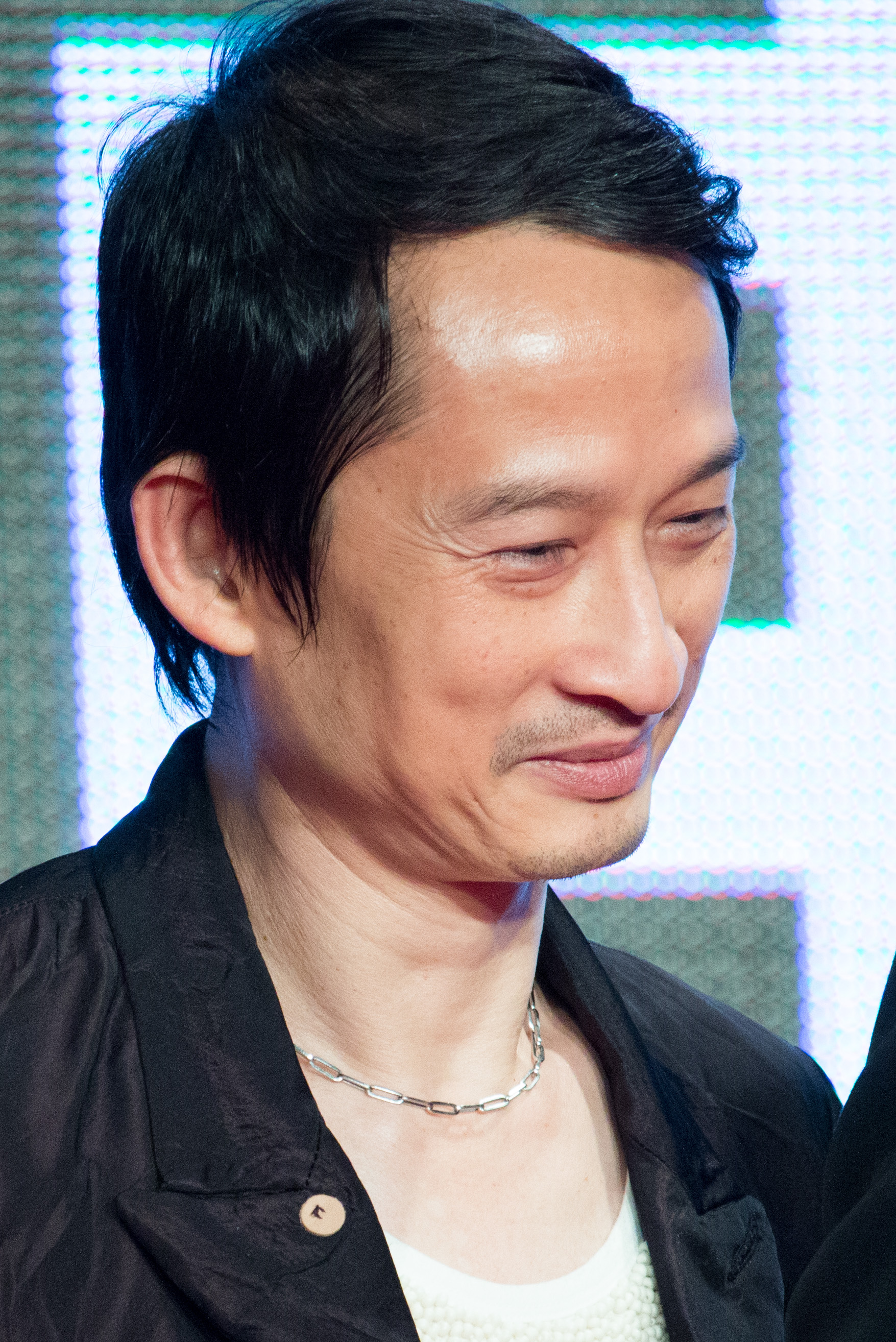
- Trần Anh Hùng at the 28th Tokyo International Film Festival in 2015
- Born: December 23, 1962 (age 63); Da Nang, South Vietnam
- Citizenship: French
- Occupations: Film director, screenwriter
- Years active: 1989–present
- Spouse: Trần Nữ Yên Khê
- Children: 2

Trần Anh Hùng (English: Anh Hung Tran), born December 23, 1962) is a Vietnamese-born French filmmaker.

== Early life and education ==
Hung was born in Da Nang, South Vietnam. Following the fall of Saigon at the end of the Vietnam War in 1975, he immigrated to France at age 12.

Hung majored in philosophy at a university in France. By chance, he saw Robert Bresson's film A Man Escaped and decided to study film instead. He went on to study photography at the National School Supérieure Louis-Lumière, which trains cinematographers and supported himself by working in the Musée d'Orsay bookshop.

== Film career ==
Hung has been at the forefront of a wave of acclaimed overseas Vietnamese cinema over the past two decades. His films have received international fame and acclaim, and his first three features were varied meditations on life in his home country of Vietnam.

Hung's Oscar-nominated debut (for Best foreign film) was The Scent of Green Papaya (1993), which also won two top prizes at the Cannes Film Festival. His follow-up Cyclo (1995, which featured Hong Kong movie star Tony Leung Chiu-Wai), won the Golden Lion at the Venice International Film Festival. The Vertical Ray of the Sun, released in 2000, was the third film in his "Vietnam trilogy."

After a sabbatical, Hung returned with the noir psychological thriller I Come with the Rain (2009), which featured a star-studded international cast including Josh Hartnett and Elias Koteas.

Hung directed Norwegian Wood, an adaptation of Haruki Murakami's novel of the same name, which was released in Japan in December 2010.

== Films on Vietnam ==
In France, Hung studied at the film school ENS Louis-Lumière. For his graduation project in 1987 he wrote and directed a short film La femme mariée de Nam Xuong, inspired by an old Vietnamese folk tale (Truyền kỳ mạn lục).

Following this Hung made another short film, La pierre de l'attente (1989), before launching the feature film The Scent of Green Papaya (1993). The Scent of Green Papaya was acclaimed for its style and its beautiful images of Vietnamese life. To date, the film is the only representative of Vietnamese cinema to be nominated for Academy Award for Best Foreign Language Film.

The success of Papaya helped Hung gain funding for the next film, Cyclo. The film tells stories of poor people living in Ho Chi Minh City (formerly called Saigon), and was filmed on location there. Cyclo won the Golden Lion at 52nd Venice International Film Festival, and at the age of 33, Hung was one of the youngest filmmakers to be thus honored there.

Having depicted life in Ho Chi Minh City, Hung turned his attention to Hanoi in The Vertical Ray of the Sun (2000). The main characters of the film are three sisters who idolize their parents' family life, before the truth is revealed after the mother's death.

== Influences and style of film-making ==
Hung's films are made to rebuild the image of Vietnam that he lost when immigrating to France, and to provide the audience with another point of view on Vietnam when this topic has been long dominated by French and American cinema. The stories are based on Hung's knowledge about Vietnamese culture and (in the second and third films) his first-hand experience gained from trips to the country.

Hung is strongly influenced by French cinema and from some European and Japanese filmmakers, namely Bergman, Bresson, Kurosawa, Tarkovsky and Ozu.

Hung's style of filmmaking is expressed through the claim: "Art is the truth wearing a mask". He denies the conventional story-telling style and pursues making films with a new language: "to challenge the audiences' feelings, making them enjoy the films not with the critical reasoning but the language of the body".

As a banner of Vietnamese films, Hung, a French-Vietnamese director, shattered the stereotypical images of poverty and backwardness depicted in prior American and French films with his unique camera images, showing the audience a Vietnam where tenderness and cruelty coexist. In Vietnam, Hung's most famous "trilogy"—The Scent of Green Papaya (1993), Cyclo (1995), and The Vertical Ray of the Sun (2000)—expresses feelings for his country.

== Filmography ==
Feature Film
Year	English Title	Original Title	Ref.
1993	The Scent of Green Papaya	Mùi đu đủ xanh	
1995	Cyclo	Xích lô	
2000	The Vertical Ray of the Sun	Mùa hè chiếu thẳng đứng	
2009	I Come with the Rain		
2010	Norwegian Wood	ノルウェイの森	
2016	Eternity	Eternité	
2023	The Taste of Things	La Passion de Dodin Bouffant	
Short Film
Year	English Title	Original Title	Ref.
1989	La femme mariée de Nam Xuong	Người thiếu phụ Nam Xương	
1991	La pierre de l'attente	La pierre de l'attente	

== Accolades ==
Awards and nominations received by Trần Anh Hùng
Organizations (Note: Awards, festivals, honors and other miscellaneous organizations are listed in alphabetical order.)	Year (Note: Indicates the year of ceremony. Each year is linked to the article about the awards held that year, wherever possible.)	Category	Work	Result	Ref.
Academy Awards	1994	Best International Feature Film	The Scent of Green Papaya	Nominated	
Academy Awards	2024	Best International Feature Film	The Taste of Things	Shortlisted	
Astra Film Awards	2024	Best International Feature	The Taste of Things	Nominated	
Astra Film Awards	2024	Best International Filmmaker	The Taste of Things	Nominated	
British Film Institute	1994	Sutherland Trophy	The Scent of Green Papaya	Won	
Cannes Film Festival	1989	Critics' Week Grand Prize Short Film	La femme mariée de Nam Xuong	Nominated	
Cannes Film Festival	1993	Award of the Youth	The Scent of Green Papaya	Won	
Cannes Film Festival	1993	Caméra d'Or	The Scent of Green Papaya	Won	
Cannes Film Festival	2000	Un Certain Regard	The Vertical Ray of the Sun	Nominated	
Cannes Film Festival	2023	Best Director	The Taste of Things	Won	
Cannes Film Festival	2023	Palme d'Or	The Taste of Things	Nominated	
César Awards	1994	Best Debut	The Scent of Green Papaya	Won	
CineLibri	2016	Grand Prize for Best Literary Adaptation	Eternity	Nominated	
Deauville Asian Film Festival	2011	Best Film	Norwegian Wood	Nominated	
Film Fest Ghent	1995	Grand Prix for Best Film	Cyclo	Won	
International Istanbul Film Festival	2011	Fipresci Prize	Norwegian Wood	Won	
Lund International Fantastic Film Festival	2009	Siren Award - Best International Film	I Come with the Rain	Nominated	
Magritte Awards	2017	Best Foreign Film in Coproduction	Eternity	Nominated	
Mill Valley Film Festival	2023	Audience Award – World Cinema	The Taste of Things	Won	
Miskolc International Film Festival	2023	Emeric Pressburger Prize	The Taste of Things	Nominated	
Montclair Film Festival	2023	Audience Award – World Cinema	The Taste of Things	Won	
Palm Springs International Film Festival	2024	Best International Feature Film	The Taste of Things	Nominated	
San Sebastián International Film Festival	2023	Culinary Zinema Best Film Award	The Taste of Things	Won	
Sydney Film Festival	2011	Sydney Film Prize	Norwegian Wood	Nominated	
Torino Film Festival	1989	Best Short Film	La femme mariée de Nam Xuong	Nominated	
Venice Film Festival	1995	Fipresci Award	Cyclo	Won	
Venice Film Festival	1995	Golden Lion	Cyclo	Won	
Venice Film Festival	2010	Golden Lion	Norwegian Wood	Nominated	
Vietnamese International Film Festival	2013	Inspiration Award	—	Honored	
Washington D.C. Area Film Critics Association	2023	Best Foreign Language Film	The Taste of Things	Nominated	

== See also ==
- List of Academy Award winners and nominees of Asian descent
