= C'est la vie (1990 film) =

- Directed by: Diane Kurys
- Written by: Diane Kurys
- Screenplay by: Diane Kurys; Alain Le Henry
- Story by: Diane Kurys
- Produced by: Diane Kurys; Alexandre Arcady
- Starring: Nathalie Baye; Richard Berry; Zabou; Jean-Pierre Bacri; Vincent Lindon
- Cinematography: Giuseppe Lanci
- Edited by: Raymonde Guyot
- Music by: Philippe Sarde
- Distributed by: UGC Distribution
- Release date: 14 February 1990
- Running time: 110 minutes
- Country: France
- Language: French

C'est la vie (French: La Baule-les-Pins) is a semi-autobiographical 1990 French drama written and directed by Diane Kurys. Like Peppermint Soda, Cocktail Molotov, and Entre Nous the plot revisits the theme of divorce and its effects. Set in the French beach resort of La Baule-les-Pins in the summer of 1958, it is mainly narrated in voice-over from the thirteen-year-old Frédérique's diary.

== Plot ==
For their summer holiday in 1958, Frédérique aged 13 and her sister Sophie aged 8 go to the station with their mother Léna and nanny Odette. Their father Michel has decided to stay in Lyon and look after his business while the rest of the family go to La Baule-les-Pins, where they will meet up with the girls' uncle Léon, aunt Bella, and cousins.

As they get in the train, Léna says she will follow later, since she has to go to Paris. When she does turn up, she behaves mysteriously and it becomes apparent that she has a lover in tow. Léon and Bella reluctantly accept him, though he is young, jobless, and living in a tent. He leaves to go and stay with a friend in New York, after begging Léna to get a divorce and join him.

She decides to go to Paris and find a job, for which she buys a car. Back at La Baule-les-Pins, Michel turns up and is horrified to find his wife gone and children abandoned. When Léna returns in her car, he smashes it up and the two then have a battle in front of Odette and the terrified girls, only ending when Frédérique threatens to kill herself with a shard of broken glass.

Michel moves out to a rented room and tries to reconcile with the family. Sophie is still young enough to be daddy's girl, but Frédérique has seen too much to trust him again, while Léna is adamant that she has left him forever.

== Cast ==
- Nathalie Baye as Léna Korski
- Richard Berry as Michel Korski
- Zabou as Bella Mandel, sister of Léna
- Jean-Pierre Bacri as Léon Mandel, husband of Bella
- Vincent Lindon as Jean-Claude, lover of Léna
- Valeria Bruni Tedeschi as Odette, the nanny
- Julie Bataille as Frédérique, elder daughter of Léna et Michel
- Candice Lefranc as Sophie, her sister
- Alexis Derlon as Daniel, eldest son of Bella and Léon
- Emmanuelle Boidron as Suzanne, youngest daughter of Bella and Léon
- Maxime Boidron as René, third child of Bella and Léon
- Benjamin Sack as Titi, youngest son of Bella and Léon
