= List of French films of 1994 =

A list of films produced in France in 1994.

French films released in 1994
Title	Director	Cast	Genre	Notes
Amateur	Hal Hartley	Isabelle Huppert, Martin Donovan, Elina Löwensohn	Comedy, thriller	British-French-American co-production
Bonsoir	Jean-Pierre Mocky	Michel Serrault, Jean-Claude Dreyfus, Claude Jade, Marie-Christine Barrault, Corinne Le Poulain, Serge Riaboukine	Comedy	
Burnt by the Sun	Nikita Mikhalkov	Nikita Mikhalkov, Oleg Menshikov, Ingeborga Dapkūnaitė	Drama	Russian–French co-production
Cemetery Man	Michele Soavi	Rupert Everett, François Hadji-Lazaro, Anna Falchi	Horror	Italian-French-German co-production
La Cité de la peur	Alain Berbérian	Alain Chabat, Dominique Farrugia, Chantal Lauby	Comedy	
Colonel Chabert	Yves Angelo	Gérard Depardieu, Fanny Ardant, Fabrice Luchini	Drama	
Death and the Maiden	Roman Polanski	Sigourney Weaver, Ben Kingsley, Stuart Wilson	Thriller	American–British–French co-production
The Heart's Cry	Idrissa Ouedraogo	Richard Bohringer, Saïd Diarra, Félicité Wouassi	Drama	
L'Enfer	Claude Chabrol	Emmanuelle Béart, François Cluzet, Marc Lavoine	Drama	
Elles ne pensent qu'à ça...	Charlotte Dubreuil	Claudia Cardinale, Carole Laure, Bernard Le Coq	Comedy	
Faust	Jan Švankmajer	Petr Čepek	Avant-garde, fantasy	Czech-French-British-German co-production
La Fille de d'Artagnan	Bertrand Tavernier	Sophie Marceau, Philippe Noiret, Claude Rich	Adventure	
Grosse Fatigue	Michel Blanc	Michel Blanc, Carole Bouquet, Philippe Noiret	Comedy	
Un indien dans la ville	Hervé Palud	Ludwig Briand, Thierry Lhermitte, Patrick Timsit	Comedy	
I Can't Sleep	Claire Denis	Yekaterina Golubeva, Richard Courcet, Line Renaud	Drama	French-Swiss co-production
Léon	Luc Besson	Jean Reno, Natalie Portman, Gary Oldman	Thriller	
The Monster	Roberto Benigni	Roberto Benigni, Nicoletta Braschi, Michel Blanc	Comedy	Italian–French co-production
Neuf mois	Patrick Braoudé	Patrick Braoudé, Philippine Leroy-Beaulieu, Catherine Jacob	Comedy	
The Patriots	Éric Rochant	Yvan Attal, Dan Toren, Yossi Banai	Spy, thriller	
Le Péril jeune	Cédric Klapisch	Romain Duris, Nicolas Koretz, Vincent Elbaz	Comedy-drama	
La Reine Margot	Patrice Chéreau	Isabelle Adjani, Daniel Auteuil, Jean-Hugues Anglade	Historical, epic	
La Séparation	Christian Vincent	Isabelle Huppert, Daniel Auteuil, Jérôme Deschamps	Drama	
Seven Sundays	Jean-Charles Tacchella	Thierry Lhermitte, Maurizio Nichetti, Rod Steiger	Comedy	French–Italian co-production
Something Fishy	Tonie Marshall	Anémone, Roland Bertin, Grégoire Colin	Comedy, mystery	
Three Colors: White	Krzysztof Kieślowski	Zbigniew Zamachowski, Julie Delpy, Janusz Gajos	Comedy drama	French-Swiss–Polish co-production
Three Colors: Red	Krzysztof Kieślowski	Irène Jacob, Jean-Louis Trintignant, Frederique Feder	Drama	French-Swiss-Polish co-production
The Tit and the Moon	J.J. Bigas Luna	Mathilda May, Miguel Poveda, Gérard Darmon	Drama	Spanish–French co-production
An Unforgettable Summer	Lucian Pintilie	Kristin Scott Thomas, Claudiu Bleonț	Drama, war	French–Romanian co-production
War of the Buttons	John Roberts	Liam Cunningham, Gregg Fitzgerald, Colm Meaney	Children's, drama	French-British co-production
Wild Reeds	André Téchiné	Élodie Bouchez, Gaël Morel, Stéphane Rideau	Drama	

== See also ==
- 1994 in France
