= Gérard Darmon =

French-Moroccan actor and singer (born 1948)

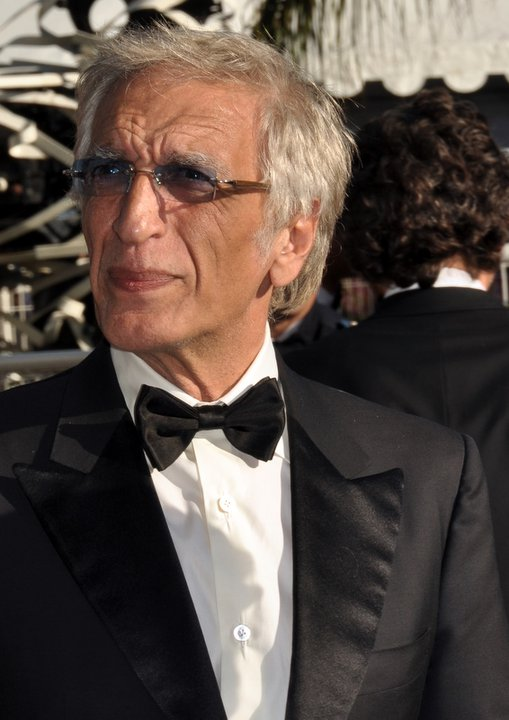
- Darmon at the 2011 Cannes Film Festival
- Born: 29 February 1948 (age 78); Paris, France
- Occupations: Actor; singer
- Years active: 1970–present
- Spouse: Mathilda May (m. 1994-1999)
- Children: 3

Gérard Darmon (French pronunciation: [ʒeʁaʁ daʁmɔ̃], Arabic: جيرار دارمون; born 29 February 1948) is a French-Moroccan actor and singer. He has been nominated for the César Award for Best Supporting Actor twice, for his roles in Betty Blue (1987) and Asterix & Obelix: Mission Cleopatra (2003).

== Personal life ==
He was the second husband of actress Mathilda May (mother of his two youngest children). He has three children: Virginie (born 1968) and, by May, daughter Sarah (born 17 August 1994) and son Jules (born 4 March 1997).

Darmon also did a cover of "Mambo Italiano".

Darmon is of Sephardic Jewish (Algerian-Jewish) descent. In July 2012, he was naturalised Moroccan by a decree from King Mohamed VI.

In 2024, several women described experiencing sexism and sexual harassment from Darmon on several films.

== Theater ==
Year	Title	Author	Director
1970	Les Fraises musclées	Jean-Michel Ribes	Jean-Michel Ribes
1971	Murder in the Cathedral	T. S. Eliot	Jean Guichard
1972	Je suis un steak	Jean-Michel Ribes	Jean-Michel Ribes
1972	Par delà les marronniers	Jean-Michel Ribes	Jean-Michel Ribes
1974	L'Odyssée d'une tasse de thé	Jean-Michel Ribes	Jean-Michel Ribes
1975	The Baron in the Trees	Italo Calvino	Jacques Échantillon
1976	Ruy Blas	Victor Hugo	Jean-Pierre Bouvier
1977	Les Catcheuses	Jean-Bernard Moraly	Jean-Louis Manceau
1978	King's Men	William Shakespeare	Denis Llorca
1978	Romeo and Juliet	William Shakespeare	Denis Llorca
1978	Le Voyage sur la lune	Edmond Rostand	Denis Llorca
1979	Lorenzaccio	Alfred de Musset	Jean-Pierre Bouvier
1980	La Guerre des roses	Denis Llorca	Raoul Billerey & Denis Llorca
1981	Le Cid	Pierre Corneille	Pierre Debauche
1981	À force d'attendre l'autobus	Eva Darlan	Eva Darlan
1982	Crime on Goat-Island	Ugo Betti	Louis Thierry
1983	Un caprice	Alfred de Musset	Anémone
1983	On purge bébé	Georges Feydeau	Pascal Aubier
1983	Argent mon bel amour	Roger Hanin	Roger Hanin
1996	Le Roman de Lulu	David Decca	Didier Long
2007-08	Thalasso	Amanda Sthers	Stéphan Guérin-Tillié
2010-11	Je l'aimais	Anna Gavalda	Patrice Leconte
2012-13	Address Unknown	Kressmann Taylor	Delphine de Malherbe
2015	Vous êtes mon sujet	Didier Van Cauwelaert	Alain Sachs
2016-17	Tout à refaire	Philippe Lellouche	Gérard Darmon
2018-19	L'Ordre des choses	Marc Fayet	Richard Berry
2022-23	Relatively Speaking	Alan Ayckbourn	Ladislas Chollat
2025	Un château de cartes	Hadrien Raccah	Serge Postigo

== Filmography ==
=== Cinema ===
Year	Title	Role	Director	Notes
1973	The Mad Adventures of Rabbi Jacob	Farès's bodyguard	Gérard Oury	
1975	Le faux-cul	Blumenfeld	Roger Hanin	
1976	Un mari, c'est un mari	The biker	Serge Friedman	
1979	On efface tout	Brahim	Pascal Vidal	
1979	Courage fuyons	The provocative	Yves Robert	
1981	Diva	L'Antillais	Jean-Jacques Beineix	
1981	Putain d'histoire d'amour	Max	Gilles Béhat	
1982	La baraka	Julien	Jean Valère	
1982	Le Grand Pardon	Roland Bettoun	Alexandre Arcady	
1983	Les princes	Nara	Tony Gatlif	
1983	Cap Canaille	Nino Baretto	Juliet Berto & Jean-Henri Roger	
1983	Le grand carnaval	Gaby Atlan	Alexandre Arcady	
1984	Our Story	Duval	Bertrand Blier	
1985	Among Wolves	The Cavale	José Giovanni	
1985	Liberté, égalité, choucroute	Mirabeau	Jean Yanne	
1985	He Died with His Eyes Open	Jean-Loup Soeren	Jacques Deray	
1986	Betty Blue	Eddy	Jean-Jacques Beineix	
1986	Rue du Départ	The Inspector	Tony Gatlif	
1986	Suivez mon regard	The cinema manager	Jean Curtelin	
1987	Le beauf	Serge	Yves Amoureux	
1988	Preuve d'amour	Martin Fresnel	Miguel Courtois	
1988	Without Fear or Blame	Jacques de Mailles	Gérard Jugnot	
1988	Pathos - Segreta inquietudine	Georges	Piccio Raffanini	
1990	Passport	Merab Papashvili / Yasha	Georgiy Daneliya	
1990	Gaspard et Robinson	Gaspard	Tony Gatlif	
1990	There Were Days... and Moons	The moody policeman	Claude Lelouch	
1991	Pour Sacha	David Malka	Alexandre Arcady	
1992	Vagabond	Quentin Christiani	Ann Le Monnier	
1992	La Belle Histoire	The biker	Claude Lelouch	
1992	Le Grand Pardon II	Roland Bettoun	Alexandre Arcady	
1993	Tout ça... pour ça !	Henri Poncet	Claude Lelouch	
1993	Pas d'amour sans amour !	Bruno	Evelyne Dress	
1994	La Cité de la peur	Patrick Bialès	Alain Berbérian	
1994	Le voleur et la menteuse	Paul Salomon	Paul Boujenah	
1994	Save the Rabbits	The Inspector	Jean-Pierre Marois	Short
1995	The Tit and the Moon	Maurice	Bigas Luna	
1996	Les victimes	Bleche	Patrick Grandperret	
1996	Let's Hope it Lasts	Victor Brulin	Michel Thibaud	
1997	Amour et confusions	Simon	Patrick Braoudé	
1999	Les grandes bouches	Lamar	Bernie Bonvoisin	
2000	Granturismo	Jean-Michel	Denis Thybaud	Short
2002	3 zéros	Oscar Marbello	Fabien Onteniente	
2002	Le Boulet	Kowalski	Alain Berbérian & Frédéric Forestier	
2002	Asterix & Obelix: Mission Cleopatra	Amonbofis	Alain Chabat	
2003	The Car Keys	Himself	Laurent Baffie	
2003	The Good Thief	Raoul	Neil Jordan	
2003	Le Cœur des hommes	Jeff	Marc Esposito	
2003	Mais qui a tué Pamela Rose ?	Phil Canon	Éric Lartigau	
2004	Pédale dure	Loïc	Gabriel Aghion	
2004	Mariage mixte	Max Zagury	Alexandre Arcady	
2005	Les parrains	Henri	Frédéric Forestier	
2005	Emmenez-moi	Jean-Claude Meunier	Edmond Bensimon	
2007	Deux vies... plus une	Sylvain Weiss	Idit Cebula	
2007	Le coeur des hommes 2	Jeff	Marc Esposito	
2008	The American Trap	Paul Mondoloni	Charles Binamé	
2009	Celle que j'aime	Jean	Élie Chouraqui	
2009	Arthur and the Revenge of Maltazard	Maltazard	Luc Besson	Voice
2010	Arthur 3: The War of the Two Worlds	Maltazard	Luc Besson	Voice
2011	Low Cost	Jean-Claude	Maurice Barthélemy	
2011	Bienvenue à bord	Richard Morena	Éric Lavaine	
2011	The End	Himself	Didier Barcelo	Short
2012	Nos plus belles vacances	Bernard	Philippe Lellouche	
2013	The Ultimate Accessory	The doctor	Valérie Lemercier	
2015	Bis	Eric's father	Dominique Farrugia	
2015	All Three of Us	The father	Kheiron	
2015	Robin des bois, la véritable histoire	Sheriff of Nottingham	Anthony Marciano	
2017	Everyone's Life	Paul Richer	Claude Lelouch	
2018	Brillantissime	Georges	Michèle Laroque	
2018	Rolling to You	Max	Franck Dubosc	
2019	Vous êtes jeunes vous êtes beaux	Lucius Marnant	Franchin Don	
2020	Boutchou	Roberto	Adrien Piquet-Gauthier	
2020	Brutus vs César	Cassius	Kheiron	
2020	Dernière ligne droite	Dominique	Arnaud Mizzon	Short
2022	King	Max	David Moreau	
2022	Irréductible	Roselyn Bacheron	Jérôme Commandeur	
2022	L'amour c'est mieux que la vie	Gérard Prat	Claude Lelouch	
2022	La débandade	Gaëtan	Fanny Dussart	Short
2023	Little Jesus	Bernard	Julien Rigoulot	
2023	Asterix & Obelix: The Middle Kingdom	The narrator	Guillaume Canet	
2024	Les Cadeaux	Michel Stein	Raphaële Moussafir & Christophe Offenstein	
2024	À l'ancienne	Henri	Hervé Mimran	
2024	Neuilly-Poissy	The juge	Grégory Boutboul	
2024	L'heureuse élue	Roland	Frank Bellocq	
2024	On fait quoi maintenant ?	Jean-Pierre Savarin	Lucien Jean-Baptiste	
2024	The Lies We Tell Ourselves	Gérard	Saara Lamberg	
2025	It Takes Two to Tango	Antoine Toussaint	Jean-Pierre Améris	

=== Television ===
Year	Title	Role	Director	Notes
1973	Arsène Lupin	Prévailles's bodyguard	Jean-Pierre Desagnat	TV series (1 episode)
1977	Auteurs en folie	Paul	Joseph Drimal, Claude Fayard & Jean-Paul Roux	TV mini-series
1978	Douze heures pour mourir	Pépé Gomez	Abder Isker	TV movie
1979	Les héritiers	The notary	Joyce Buñuel	TV series (1 episode)
1979	Il était un musicien	Stravinski	Roger Hanin	TV series (1 episode)
1980	Le coffre et le revenant	Blaise	Roger Hanin	TV movie
1981	Henri IV	Di Nolli	Jeannette Hubert	TV movie
1983	Merci Bernard	Paolini	Jean-Michel Ribes	TV series (1 episode)
1988	Les après-midi de Monsieur Forestier	Bernard Barrière	Gérard Jourd'hui	TV movie
1989	Série noire	Laurent	Laurent Heynemann	TV series (1 episode)
1993	Le sang des innocents	Vincent Millau	Miguel Courtois	TV movie
1995	Comment épouser un héritage ?	Cargèse	Patrice Ambard	TV movie
1996	L'enfer vert	Maurice Laporta	Philippe Bensoussan	TV movie
1996	La ferme du crocodile	Serge Maillart	Didier Albert	TV movie
1998	Un flic presque parfait	Blanev	Marc Angelo	TV movie
2000	La cape et l'épée	The minstrel	Jean-Jacques Amsellem	TV series (2 episodes)
2001	H	The Inspector	Éric Lartigau	TV series (1 episode)
2005	Callas e Onassis	Aristotle Onassis	Giorgio Capitani	TV movie
2010	Le grand restaurant	Gérard	Gérard Pullicino	TV movie
2011	Le client	Fred Fondary	Arnauld Mercadier	TV movie
2014-15	Casting(s)	Himself	Pierre Niney & Hugo Gélin	TV series (7 episodes)
2014-16	Duel au soleil	Ange Renucci	Olivier Guignard & Didier Le Pêcheur	TV series (12 episodes)
2017	Crimes Parfaits	Frank	Didier Le Pêcheur	TV series (1 episode)
2019-20	Family Business	Gérard Hazan	Igor Gotesman	TV series (12 episodes)
2021	Capitaine Marleau	Frédéric Lefranc	Josée Dayan	TV series (1 episode)
2022	1H30 Max	Gérard	Léo Grandperret	TV movie
2022	Le Flambeau	Philippe	Jonathan Cohen & Jérémie Galan	TV series (6 episodes)
2025	Asterix and Obelix: The Big Fight	Chief Copacetix (voice)	Alain Chabat	TV miniseries

== Discography ==
- Au milieu de la nuit (2003)
- Dancing (2006)
- On s'aime (2008)

== Accolades ==
Year	Award	Nominated work	Result
1987	César Award for Best Supporting Actor	Betty Blue	Nominated
2003	César Award for Best Supporting Actor	Asterix & Obelix: Mission Cleopatra	Nominated
2008	Lumière Award for Best Actor	Le Cœur des hommes 2	Nominated
2020	Globe de Cristal Award - Best Actor in a Television Series or Mini-Series	Family Business	Nominated
