= Floc'h =

French illustrator

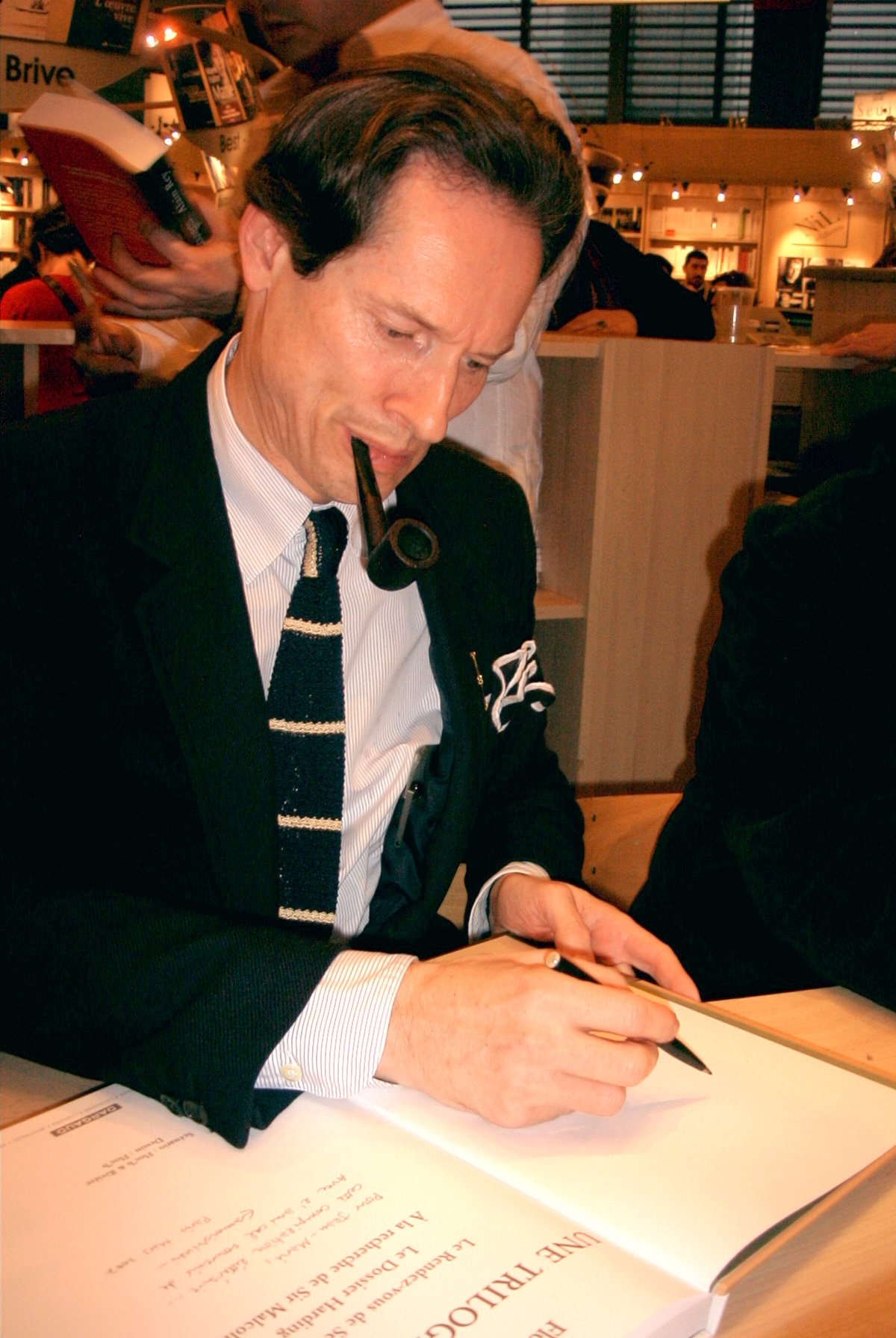
- Floc'h at the Salon du livre. Paris, March 2007.
- Born: Jean-Claude Floch; September 25, 1953 (age 73)
- Areas: Cartoonist, writer, illustrator
- Pseudonym: Floc'h

Jean-Claude Floch (French pronunciation: [ʒɑ̃ klod flɔk]; born September 25, 1953), known as Floc'h is a French illustrator, comics artist, and writer. He is known for his use of the style known as ligne claire. His older brother Jean-Louis Floch was also a cartoonist and illustrator.

== Biography ==
After a quick study at the École nationale supérieure des arts décoratifs (School of Decorative Arts) in Paris, he dedicated himself to illustration and comics. His first published comics pages were for the story Le Conservateur, written by Rodolphe, which appeared in Imagine in 1975. The comics character "Sir Francis Albany" was created for Pilote magazine by Floc'h in 1977, and collaborating with François Rivière, Floc’h published his first collection of comics in 1977, Le Rendez-vous de Sevenoaks. He and Rivière devoted themselves to a narrative and illustration style characterized by Anglophilia; the technique known as mise en abyme; as well as a ligne claire drawing style inspired by the Belgian tradition of comics illustration pioneered by Hergé and Edgar P. Jacobs. Together they would create the series known as Une trilogie anglaise (An English Trilogy), which debuted in 1977.

Floc'h’s fame grew with the publication of Le Dossier Harding in 1980. Floc'h created commercial illustrations, in which he explored new drawing techniques and developed a personal style based on graphic minimalism such as in Le Secret de la Pulmoll verte in 1980. In 1991, he collaborated with Jean-Luc Fromental on a collection of cartoons inspired by the work of F. Scott Fitzgerald, Jamais deux sans trois. They also collaborated on the books Ma Vie, Life, High Life and Var, le Département dont vous êtes le Heros.

Floc'h and François Rivière collaborated on the novel Les Chroniques d'Oliver Alban, Diary of an Ironist (2006), in which they explored the art and literature from two decades: the 1940s and the 1970s. The two wrote the texts, with Floc'h also creating the art for the book.

In 2007, Floc'h published a very personal work in the form of his book Une vie de rêve: Fragments d’une autobiographie idéale, in which he lives a long life that extends from 360 BC to May 4, 2046, during the course of which he fulfills various fantasies (for example, he becomes a student of Plato and poses for Philippe Halsman).

Known mainly for cartoons and illustrations, Floc’h has however exhibited his art at various galleries, including the Pixi gallery in Paris and the Nicholas Davies Gallery in New York City. Floc'h has also designed book covers as well as various movie posters, such as for Diabolo menthe and Smoking / No Smoking, and created illustrations for various newspapers and magazines in France, including Lire, Senso, Monsieur, L'Express, Le Nouvel Observateur, Libération, Le Monde, Le Figaro, and Elle. In the United States, he has created covers and illustrations for GQ and The New Yorker. A collection of his advertising artwork appeared in 1985 as Un Homme dans la Foule.

== Works ==
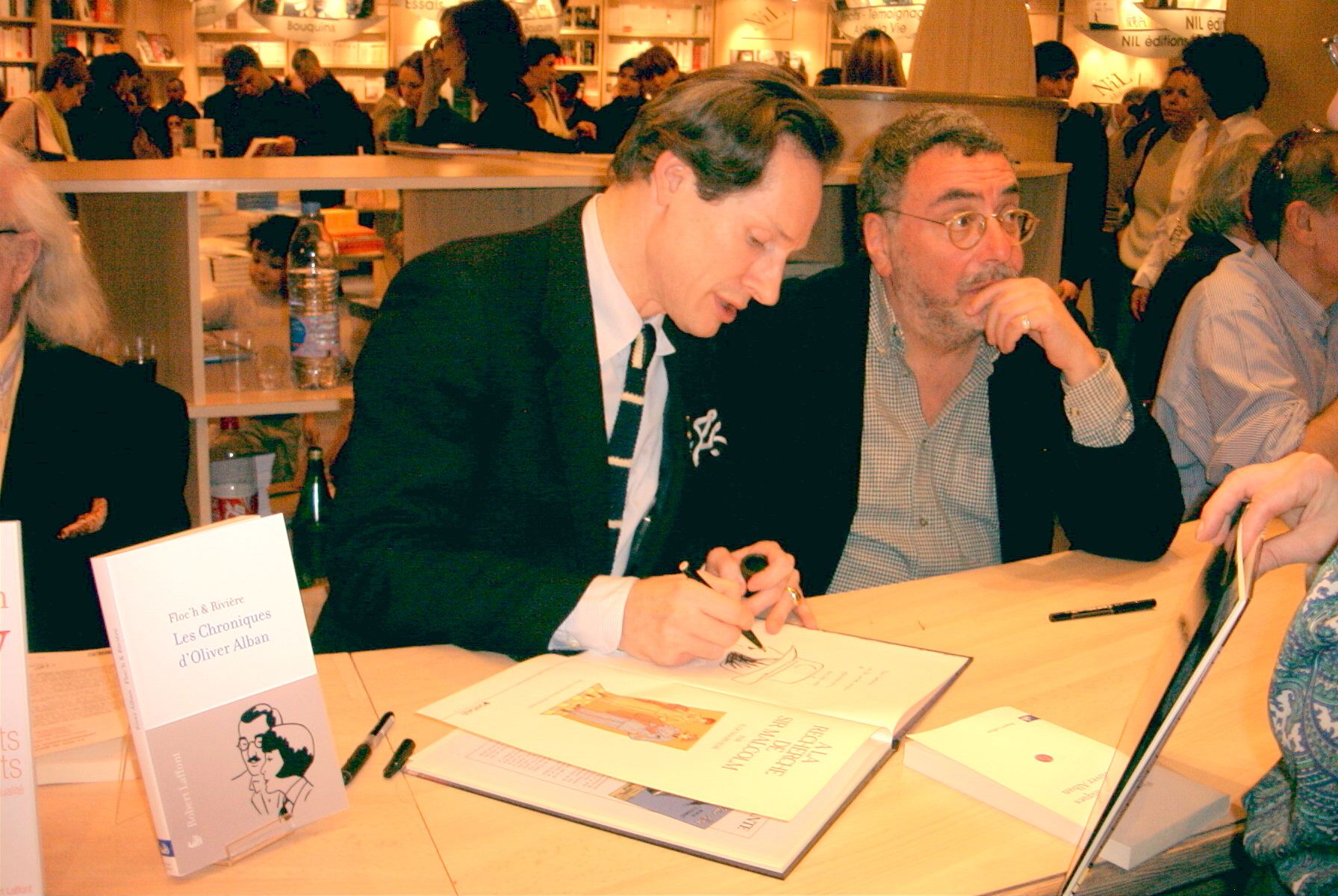
Floc'h and François Rivière at the Salon du livre. Paris, March 2007.

=== Comics ===
==== Collections of Comics ====
- 1977 : Le Rendez-vous de Sevenoaks, with François Rivière (Dargaud)
- 1980 : Le Dossier Harding, with François Rivière (Dargaud)
- 1983 : Blitz, with François Rivière (Le Matin / Albin Michel)
- 1984 : À la recherche de Sir Malcolm, with François Rivière (Dargaud)
- 1991 : Jamais deux sans trois, with Jean-Luc Fromental (Albin Michel)
- 1992 : Une trilogie anglaise, with François Rivière (Dargaud)
- 1996 : Underground, with François Rivière (Albin Michel)
- 2005 : Olivia Sturgess : 1914-2004, with François Rivière (Dargaud)
- 2009 : Black Out et autres histoires du Blitz, with François Rivière (Dargaud)

==== Limited Editions (Tirages de tête) ====
- 1984 : À la recherche de Sir Malcolm, with François Rivière.
- 1985 : Un homme dans la foule.
- 1985 : Un homme dans la foule.
- 1992 : À propos de Francis.
- 2005 : Olivia Sturgess : 1914-2004, with François Rivière.

=== Illustration ===
==== Illustrated books ====
- 1985 : Ma vie, with Jean-Luc Fromental (Les Humanoïdes Associés)
- 1985 : Life, with Jean-Luc Fromental (Carton)
- 1986 : High Life, with Jean-Luc Fromental (Carton)
- 1986 : Banque de France, collective work. Illustrations recto verso are of two bank notes, one depicting Raymond Loewy, the other Jean Cocteau (Carton)
- 1994 : Meurtre en miniature, with François Rivière (Dargaud)
- 1994 : Journal d'un New-Yorkais, with Michel Jourde (Dargaud / Champaka)
- 1997 : Ma vie 2 (Dargaud)
- 1998 : Exposition, with Michel Jourde (Reporter / Galerie Médicis)
- 2007 : Une vie de rêve (Robert Laffont)

==== Film Posters ====
- 1977 : Diabolo menthe by Diane Kurys
- 1980 : Cocktail Molotov by Diane Kurys
- 1992 : Smoking/No Smoking by Alain Resnais
- 1997 : On connaît la chanson by Alain Resnais
- 1998 : Harry dans tous ses états (Deconstructing Harry) by Woody Allen
- 1999 : La Bûche by Danièle Thompson
- 2001 : Liberté-Oléron by Bruno Podalydès
- 2001 : Vertiges by l'amour by Laurent Chouchan
- 2002 : Hollywood Ending by Woody Allen
- 2003 : Petites coupures by Pascal Bonitzer
- 2003 : Pas sur la bouche by Alain Resnais
- 2005 : Melinda and Melinda by Woody Allen
- 2005 : L'Anniversaire by Diane Kurys
- 2008 : Le Grand Alibi by Pascal Bonitzer

=== Novels ===
- 2006 : Les Chroniques d'Oliver Alban, with François Rivière (Robert Laffont)
