= Mathilda May =

French actress (born 1965)

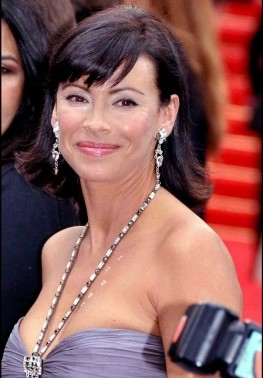
- May in 2010
- Born: Karin Haïm; 8 February 1965 (age 61); Paris, France
- Education: Conservatoire de Paris
- Years active: 1984-present
- Spouses: Paul Powell (m. 1991–1993); Gérard Darmon (m. 1994–1999); Philippe Kelly (m. 2000–2006); Sly Johnson
- Children: 2
- Father: Victor Haïm

Mathilda May (born Karin Haïm; 8 February 1965) is a French film actress and director. Her best-known roles include Space Girl in Lifeforce (1985) and Jeanne Gardella in Toutes peines confondues (1992).

May's film work is primarily in French and made for the European market. She was the recipient of the César Award for Most Promising Actress in 1988 for her role in Le Cri du Hibou (The Cry of the Owl) and the Romy Schneider Prize for best up and coming actress in 1989. In 1992, she also recorded an album called Joy of Love. May was the writer and director for the theater show Open Space, which ran from 2013 to 2015.

== Early life ==
May was born in Paris, France on February 8, 1965. Her father, the playwright, screenwriter, and actor Victor Haïm, is of Sephardic Jewish (Greek and Turkish) descent. Her mother is the Swedish ballet teacher and choreographer Margareta Hanson. May studied under Christiane Vaussard at the Conservatoire de Paris, graduating at age 16.

== Career ==
May's film work is primarily in French and made for the European market. She was the recipient of the César Award for Most Promising Actress in 1988 and the Prix Romy Schneider in 1989. Non-French films she has appeared in include Naked Tango (1990), Becoming Colette (1991), and The Tit and the Moon (1994). In the United States, she is best known for her role as an alien vampire in the Tobe Hooper science fiction horror film Lifeforce (1985), in which she is nude for much of her performance. May was 18 during production, and the extensive nudity required for the role presented difficulties during filming. She also appeared in the 1996 space adventure game Privateer 2: The Darkening. She played Isabella in The Jackal, a 1997 action film.

May recorded an album in 1992 called Joy of Love.

May was the writer and director for the theater show Open Space, which was performed in the Théâtre Jean-Vilar in the commune of Suresnes, the Théâtre du Rond-Point, and the Théâtre de Paris from 2013 to 2015. Open Space was a show without words; the story was presented by movement, music, and sound. May said of the show "[i]t will be choreographed without it being dance, and musical without an instrument".

== Personal life ==
May has been married four times. Her first husband was Paul Powell. Her second husband was Gérard Darmon, with whom she has two children, a daughter and a son. Her third husband was Philippe Kelly. Her fourth husband was Sly Johnson.

== Filmography ==
Year	Title	Role	Director	Notes
1984	Nemo	Alice	Arnaud Sélignac	
1985	Lifeforce	Space Girl	Tobe Hooper	
1985	Les Rois du gag	Alexandra	Claude Zidi	
1987	La vie dissolue de Gérard Floque	Pauline	Georges Lautner	
1987	The Cry of the Owl	Juliette	Claude Chabrol	César Award for Most Promising Actress
1988	La passerelle	Cora Elbaz	Jean-Claude Sussfeld	
1988	Three Seats for the 26th	Marion	Jacques Demy	
1990	Naked Tango	Alba/Stéphanie	Leonard Schrader	
1991	Isabelle Eberhardt	Isabelle Eberhardt	Ian Pringle	
1991	Scream of Stone	Katharina	Werner Herzog	
1991	Becoming Colette	Sidonie Gabrielle Colette	Danny Huston	
1992	Toutes peines confondues	Jeanne Gardella	Michel Deville	
1994	Le voleur et la menteuse	Suzanne Henson	Paul Boujenah	
1994	Dead Tired	Herself	Michel Blanc	
1994	The Tit and the Moon	Estrellita	Bigas Luna	
1996	Celluloide	Cameo	Carlo Lizzani	
1997	The Jackal	Isabella Zanconia	Michael Caton-Jones	
1999	Entrevue	Alix	Marie-Pierre Huster	Short
2000	Là-bas... mon pays	Nelly Azera	Alexandre Arcady	
2004	Love Express	Anne-Charlotte	Elena Hazanov	
2007	New délire	Fanny's voice	Éric Le Roch	
2007	A Girl Cut in Two	Capucine Jamet	Claude Chabrol (2)	
2012	The Players	Ariane	Jean Dujardin	
2019	Je ne rêve que de vous	Cora Madou	Laurent Heynemann	
2021	Le Chemin du bonheur	Sarah Glücksmann	Nicolas Steil	

== Television ==
Year	Title	Role	Notes
1985	Giorno dopo giorno		TV series
1986	Les louves	Agnès	Miniseries
1986	Se un giorno busserai alla mia porta		TV film
1988	The Secret of the Sahara	Myriam	Miniseries
1988	Piazza Navona	Jeanne	Episode 6
1988	L'heure Simenon	Edmée	Episode 10
1994	The Whipping Boy	Betsy	TV film
1996	Noces cruelles	Sandra	TV film
1996	La ferme du crocodile	Sandrine Jaussier	TV film
1998	Only Love	Silvia Rinaldi	TV film
2000	Les redoutables	Military woman	Episode 6
2001	De toute urgence	Julie	TV film
2001	Caméra Café	The Boss's wife	1 episode
2002	Fabio Montale	Hélène Pessayre	2 episodes
2002	Perlasca – Un eroe Italiano	Contessa Eleonora	TV film
2003	Soyez prudents...		TV film
2003	Soraya		TV film
2005	L'homme pressé	Irène Debord	TV film
2005	L'homme qui voulait passer à la télé	Mélanie	TV film
2009	Au siècle de Maupassant	Thérèse de Marsanne	1 episode
2010	Les nuits d'Alice	Angélique	TV film
2011	Une vie française	Anna Blick	TV film
2012	Clash	Laure Rossignol	3 episodes
2013	La croisière	Françoise	1 episode
2013	Délit de fuite	Cécile	TV film
2014	Crossing Lines	Audrey St. Marie	1 episode
2015	On se retrouvera	Hélène Janson	TV film
2016	Mystère à l'Opéra	Éva Fontaine	TV film
2018	Access	Valérie Couderq	11 episodes
2020	Coup de foudre à Bangkok	Sandrine Lafore	TV film
2023	Daron	Coco	

== Video Games ==
Year	Title	Notes
1996	Privateer 2: The Darkening	Melissa Banks

== Awards and accolades ==
- The César Award (the national film award of France): 1988 Best Young Female Newcomer for The Cry of the Owl
- The 1989 Romy Schneider Award
- The 2019 Molliere for Best Director of a Public Theatre Show for The Wedding Banquet
- The 2020 Molliere for Best Solo Performance for her production of Monsieur X starring Pierre Richard at the Théâtre de l’Atelier.
- The 2020 SACD (Société des Auteurs et Compositeurs Dramatiques) for Best Director
