= Emmanuelle Boidron =

French actress

- Born: Emmanuelle Boidron; 4 August 1978 (age 47); Orléans, Loiret, France
- Spouse: Antoine Jacoutot (m. 1998)
- Children: 2

Emmanuelle Boidron (born 4 August 1978, in Orléans, Loiret, France), is a French actress. Her most important appearance is in the Navarro TV series as Yolande Navarro.

== Filmography ==
Year	Title	Role	Director	Notes
1988	La petite amie		Luc Béraud	
1989-2005	Navarro	Navarro's daughter, Yolande Navarro		TV series (108 episodes)
1989	La Baby-sitter	Anaïs		TV series (42 episodes)
1990	C'est la vie (La Baule-les-Pins)	Suzanne	Diane Kurys	
1990	Les compagnons de l'aventure	Lola		TV series (40 episodes)
2005	Mademoiselle Navarro	Yolande Navarro	Jean Sagols	TV movie
2007	Les liens du sang	Virginie Meyer	Régis Musset	TV movie
2007	Day of Disaster	Hannah	Peter Keglevic	TV movie
2007	La prophétie d'Avignon	Elsa	David Delrieux	TV series (8 episodes)
2008	Cinq Sœurs	Léa Mattei		TV series (108 episodes)
2008	Bébé à bord	Audrey	Nicolas Herdt	TV movie
2009	Brigade Navarro	Yolande Navarro		TV series (1 episode)
2013	Camping Paradis	Murielle		TV series (1 episode)
2014	Je suis coupable	Girl 5	Karine Lima	Short
2017	Vive la crise	Sidonie	Jean-François Davy	
