= Nothing But Lies =

Nothing But Lies may refer to:

- Nothing But Lies (1991 film), a French-Swiss drama film
- Nothing But Lies (1933 film), a French comedy film
- Nothing But Lies, a 1920 film by Lawrence C. Windom
