= Adultery: A User's Guide =

1995 film directed by Christine Pascal

- DVD cover
- Directed by: Christine Pascal
- Written by: Christine Pascal; Robert Boner
- Produced by: Robert Boner
- Starring: Richard Berry; Karin Viard; Vincent Cassel
- Cinematography: Renato Berta
- Edited by: Jacques Comets
- Music by: Bruno Coulais
- Production companies: Ciné Manufacture SA; France 2 RTS Radio Télévision Suisse
- Release date: 1995
- Running time: 95 minutes
- Countries: France; Switzerland
- Language: French

Adultery: A User's Guide (French: Adultère, mode d'emploi) is a 1995 Swiss romantic comedy-drama film directed by Christine Pascal and written by Pascal and Robert Boner. It follows a couple whose relationship comes under strain. The film was selected as the Swiss entry for the Best Foreign Language Film at the 68th Academy Awards. It was screened at festivals including Locarno, Toronto, Montreal, and Namur.

== Synopsis ==
Over the course of one day, the married Parisian architects Fabienne and Bruno anxiously await the result of an important competition they have entered. Unable to handle the strain, both seek relief elsewhere: Bruno acts on a sexual fantasy, while Fabienne gives in to the advances of Simon, Bruno’s friend. Their situation becomes more complicated when they learn the truth about each other’s actions.

== Cast ==
The cast includes:

- Richard Berry as Simon
- Karin Viard as Fabienne
- Vincent Cassel as Bruno
- Emmanuelle Halimi as Sarah
- Liliane Rovère as Simon's mistress

== Production ==
Adultery: A User’s Guide was Christine Pascal’s last film.

== Reception ==
=== Awards and nominations ===
The film was selected as the Swiss entry for the Best Foreign Language Film at the 68th Academy Awards, but was not nominated.

=== Critical response ===
Filmdienst wrote that the film skilfully interweaves its web of relationships, with characters who repeatedly behave in ways that frustrate audience expectations.

== Festival screenings ==
The film was screened at festivals including the 48th Locarno International Film Festival, the 1995 Toronto International Film Festival, the 1995 Montreal World Film Festival, and the Festival international du film francophone de Namur in 1995. In later years, it was shown at the 17th Filmfestival Max Ophüls Preis in 1996 and the Moscow International Film Festival in 1999.

== See also ==
- List of submissions to the 68th Academy Awards for Best Foreign Language Film
- List of Swiss submissions for the Academy Award for Best Foreign Language Film
