= Arrête ton cinéma =

- Theatrical release poster
- Directed by: Diane Kurys
- Written by: Diane Kurys; Sylvie Testud
- Based on: C'est le métier qui rentre by Sylvie Testud
- Produced by: Alexandre Arcady
- Starring: Sylvie Testud; Josiane Balasko; Zabou Breitman; Fred Testot; Antoine Duléry
- Cinematography: Gilles Henry
- Edited by: Sylvie Gadmer
- Production company: Alexandre Films
- Distributed by: BAC Films
- Release date: 13 January 2016
- Running time: 90 minutes
- Country: France
- Language: French
- Budget: $6.8 million
- Box office: $1 million

Arrête ton cinéma is a 2016 French comedy film directed by Diane Kurys. and written by Diane Kurys and Sylvie Testud.

== Plot ==
Sybille, a recognized actress, preparing with enthusiasm her first writing film to get behind the camera. Everything seems to go well. Her producers, two sisters, are two wacky but lovable characters, and Sybille empties into the adventure with them, putting aside her family life. But, from the unlikely choice of actresses, the successive rewrites of the script, through the financial refusal, the wonderful dream turns into a nightmare. Incorrigible optimist, Sybille will realize too late that her whimsical and totally crazy producers are going to drag her in their madness ... One thing is certain, nothing will happen as planned.

== Cast ==
- Sylvie Testud as Sybille Teyssier
- Josiane Balasko as Brigitte
- Zabou Breitman as Ingrid
- Fred Testot as Adrien
- François-Xavier Demaison as Jack
- Claire Keim as Julie Dumas
- Hélène de Fougerolles as Marion
- Virginie Hocq as Annabelle
- Florence Thomassin as Chacha

=== Cameos ===
- Patrick Juvet
- Michel Drucker

== Production ==
The film is based on the fifth book written by Sylvie Testud. The film was shot in Paris and began filming on 23 February 2015. The 11 March, a special scene was shot in the cult TV Show Vivement dimanche! host by Michel Drucker with Josiane Balasko, Sylvie Testud, Diane Kurys, Alexandre Arcady and Patrick Juvet
