= Christine Pascal =

French actress, writer and director

- Born: 29 November 1953; Lyon, Rhône
- Died: 30 August 1996 (aged 42); Garches, Hauts-de-Seine
- Occupations: Actress, screenwriter, director
- Years active: 1974–1995
- Spouse: Robert Boner (1982–1996)

Christine Pascal (29 November 1953 – 30 August 1996) was a French actress, writer, and director known for Le Petit Prince a dit, 1992.

== Biography ==
Born in Lyon, Rhône, Pascal made her film debut at 21 in Michel Mitrani's Les Guichets du Louvre (1974), and began an association with Bertrand Tavernier with her next film, L'Horloger de Saint-Paul (1974). Other films with Tavernier include Que la fête commence (1975), for which she received a César nomination for Best Supporting Actress; The Judge and the Assassin (1976); Des enfants gatés (1977), which she co-scripted; and Round Midnight. Other film appearances include Black Thursday (1974), La Meilleure façon de marcher (1976), The Maids of Wilko (1979), Entre Nous (1983), and Le Grand Chemin (1987). She made her directorial debut with Félicité, and also directed La Garce, Zanzibar, Le Petit prince a dit (which won the Louis Delluc Prize) and Adultère, mode d'emploi.

Pascal had contemplated suicide at various times in her life, and Félicité, the first film she directed, opens with a suicide scene. In 1984, when asked how she would like to die, she reputedly said, "En me suicidant, le moment venu." ("By killing myself, when the time comes.")

In 1996, while staying in a psychiatric hospital in the Paris suburb of Garches, Pascal committed suicide by jumping out of a window. She is buried in Cimetière du Père Lachaise in Paris. In 2003, the psychiatrist who was caring for Pascal was sentenced to one year in prison for failing to take appropriate action to prevent her suicide.

== Filmography ==
=== As actress ===
Year	Title	Role	Notes
1974	L' Horloger de Saint-Paul	Liliane Torrini	
1974	Les Guichets du Louvre	Jeanne	
1975	Que la fête commence...	Emilie	
1975	Cécile ou La Raison des femmes: Vivre à deux	Cécile	TV mini-series
1975	Le docteur noir	Pauline	TV movie
1976	La meilleure façon de marcher	Chantal	
1976	The Judge and the Assassin	one of the strikers	Uncredited
1977	Rendez-vous en noir	the fiancée	TV mini-series
1977	Les Indiens sont encore loin	Lise	
1977	L'imprécateur	Betty Saint-Ramé	
1977	Des enfants gâtés	Anne Torrini	
1978	Chaussette surprise	Juliette	
1979	On efface tout	Anne Glizer	
1979	The Maids of Wilko	Tunia	
1979	Félicité	Félicité	
1979	Paco l'infaillible	Maria	
1980	Le Chemin perdu	Liza	
1981	Au bon beurre	Josette	TV series
1981	Das Haus im Park	Simone	
1982	Bonbons en gros	Jeannette	TV movie
1983	Entre Nous	Sarah	
1983	Cinéma 16	Isabelle	TV series
1983	Faux fuyants	the filmmaker	
1983	Elle voulait faire du cinéma	Alice Guy-Blaché	TV movie
1985	Train d'enfer	Isabelle	
1985	Signé Charlotte	Christine	
1985	Elsa, Elsa	the "true" Elsa	
1986	Round Midnight	Sylvie	
1987	Le grand chemin	Claire (Louis' mother)	
1987	Promis... juré!	Madeleine	
1988	La travestie	Christine	
1988	La couleur du vent	Hélène Plazy	
1989	Série noire	Corinne	Episode: "Main pleine"
1989	Pause-café	Josiane Vernon	Episode: "La traverse"
1990	Navarro	Sylvie Rivette	Episode: "Fils de périph"
1990	L'ami Giono: Le déserteur	Marie-Jeanne	TV movie
1990	Le sixième doigt	Viviane	
1990	A Ilha	Linda Walsh	Short
1991	Rien que des mensonges	Lise	
1992	La femme de l'amant	Laetitia	TV movie
1994	Regarde les hommes tomber	Sandrine	
1994	Les patriotes	Laurence	
1994	Le sourire	Chantal	(final film role)

=== As director ===
Year	Title	Notes
1979	Félicité	
1985	La Garce	
1989	Zanzibar	
1992	Le petit Prince a dit	Cesar Nominations for Best Film and Best Director
1995	Adultère (mode d'emploi)	

== Awards and nominations ==
Year	Result	Award	Category	Film or series
1976	Nominated	César Awards	Best Supporting Actress	Que la fête commence
1993	Nominated	César Awards	Best Film	Le Petit prince a dit
1993	Nominated	César Awards	Best Director	Le Petit prince a dit
1992	Won	Louis Delluc Prize	Prix Louis Delluc	Le Petit prince a dit
1992	Won	Montréal World Film Festival	Best Screenplay	Le Petit prince a dit (Shared with Robert Boner)
