= Sacha Sperling =

French novelist and screenwriter (born 1990)

Sacha Sperling (real name Yacha Kurys; born 17 May 1990) is a French novelist and screenwriter.

He was born in Paris, the son of filmmakers Diane Kurys and Alexandre Arcady; he is the half-brother of film director Alexandre Aja. He attended the École alsacienne up to baccalaureat level, but abandoned undergraduate literary studies to devote himself to writing. His first novel, Mes illusions donnent sur la cour, was published in 2009. The title of the novel was taken from a song by Serge Gainsbourg and traces the life of a high school student from a wealthy Parisian background - his love life, his difficult relationship with his parents, skipping classes at school, alcohol, drug abuse... His second novel, Les Cœurs en skaï mauve, was published by Fayard in 2011. The title is taken from Philippe Djian’s novel 37°2 le matin which tells the story of a summer romance between an aspiring writer and an impulsive young woman. His third novel, J'ai perdu tout ce que j'aimais, was published by Fayard Press in September 2013. The title refers to a song by French singer and songwriter Alain Souchon. This work is largely autobiographical and recounts Sperling’s life following the success of his first work. His fourth novel, Histoire de petite fille, came out in 2016; Sperlind said "for the first time I have tried to avoid writing about myself, about my personal life, but have tried to be a writer rather than someone undergoing analysis." The novel tells the story of the rapid rise to fame of a young female porn star in Los Angeles. The book was nominated for the prix Renaudot in the spring of 2016. In 2017, Sperling co-wrote the screenplay for a film made by his mother, Ma mère est folle. The comedy follows the exploits of a rather eccentric mother (played by Fanny Ardant), and her young son (played by the singer Vianney).

== Bibliography ==
- Mes illusions donnent sur la cour, Fayard, 2009, ISBN 978-2-213-64416-5
- Les cœurs en skaï mauve, Fayard, 2011, ISBN 978-2-213-66305-0
- J’ai perdu tout ce que j’aimais, Fayard, 2013, ISBN 978-2-213-67816-0
- Histoire de petite fille, Éditions du Seuil, 2016, ISBN 978-2-021-31124-2
