= Love After Love (1992 film) =

1992 film

- Directed by: Diane Kurys
- Written by: Diane Kurys; Antoine Lacomblez
- Produced by: Jean-Bernard Fetoux
- Starring: Isabelle Huppert
- Cinematography: Fabio Conversi
- Edited by: Hervé Schneid
- Music by: Yves Simon
- Distributed by: UGC Distribution
- Release date: 15 April 1992
- Running time: 104 minutes
- Country: France
- Language: French
- Box office: $4.1 million

Love After Love (French: Après l'amour) is a 1992 French romance film directed by Diane Kurys starring Isabelle Huppert and Bernard Giraudeau.

== Cast ==
- Isabelle Huppert as Lola
- Bernard Giraudeau as David
- Hippolyte Girardot as Tom
- Lio as Marianne
- Yvan Attal as Romain
- Judith Reval as Rachel
- Ingrid Held as Anne
- Laure Killing as Elisabeth
- Pierre Amzallag as Babysitter
- Mehdi Joossen as Simon
- Florian Billion as Olivier
- Eva Killing as Caroline
- Ana Girardot as Juliette
- Renée Amzallagas as Rebecca
- Philippe Chany as Manager

== Year-end lists ==
- Honorable mention – Michael MacCambridge, Austin American-Statesman

== See also ==
- Isabelle Huppert on screen and stage
