= Nemo (film) =

- French theatrical release poster
- Directed by: Arnaud Sélignac
- Screenplay by: Arnaud Sélignac; Jean-Pierre Esquenazi; Telsche Boorman
- Produced by: John Boorman; Claude Nedjar
- Cinematography: Philippe Rousselot
- Edited by: Tom Priestley
- Music by: Lord David Dundas; Rick Wentworth
- Production companies: Goldcrest Films; Channel Four Films; Nouvelles Editions de Films
- Distributed by: The Cannon Group, Inc.
- Release date: 13 August 1984
- Running time: 97 minutes
- Countries: United Kingdom; United States

Nemo is a 1984 fantasy film directed by Arnaud Sélignac. It is also known as Dream One.

== Plot ==
A young boy imagines being in a tale he's about to hear. In this magical world he encounters many famous characters from other tales - including "Mr Legend", a Zorro-like character - aliens, and other beings, and of course, a beautiful princess.

== Cast ==
- Seth Kibel as Child Nemo
- Jason Connery as Teen Nemo
- Mathilda May as Alice
- Harvey Keitel as Mr. Legend
- Nipsey Russell as Mr. Rip / Benjamin
- Carole Bouquet as Rals-Akrai
- Michel Blanc as Boris / Nemo's Father
- Katrine Boorman as Duchka / Nemo's Mother
- Dominique Pinon as Monkey
- Charley Boorman as Cunegond / Elevator Operator
- Gaetan Bloom as Puchkine
- Pierre Forget as Wagner
- Marcus Powell as Grunwald
- Carla D. Clark as Young Bess

== Production ==
Goldcrest Films invested £2,099,000 in the film and received £1,482,000, making a loss of £617,000. The film was directed by Arnaud Sélignac who'd previously worked for the film's producer John Boorman as a stillsman on Excalibur.
