= Becoming Colette =

- German: Colette
- French: Devenir Colette
- Directed by: Danny Huston
- Written by: Ruth Graham
- Produced by: Heinz J. Bibo; Peer J. Oppenheimer
- Starring: Klaus Maria Brandauer; Mathilda May; Virginia Madsen
- Cinematography: Wolfgang Treu
- Edited by: Peter Taylor; Roberto Silvi
- Music by: John Scott
- Production companies: BIBO Films; BC Productions; Les Films Ariane
- Release dates: October 17, 1991 (Germany); July 1, 1992 (France); November 6, 1992 (New York City)
- Running time: 97 minutes
- Countries: Germany; United Kingdom; France
- Language: English

Becoming Colette is a 1991 German-British-French biographical drama film written by Ruth Graham, directed by Danny Huston and starring Klaus Maria Brandauer and Mathilda May as Henry Gauthier-Villars and Colette respectively. It was originally entitled Colette.

== Plot ==
During one of her avant-garde theater performances, Colette notices that her ex-husband, Willy Gauthier-Villars, is in the audience, prompting her to reminisce about her development from ingénue in rural Burgundy to novelist in Paris. It follows Colette's life in her twenties and thirties, her marriage to libertine Willy, her relationship with the younger yet well-experienced actress Polaire, and the publication of her first novels under Willy's name.

Caricature of Willy, Colette and Polaire by illustrator Sem (c.1910)

== Cast ==
- Klaus Maria Brandauer as Henry Gauthier-Villars
- Mathilda May as Sidonie-Gabrielle Colette
- Virginia Madsen as Polaire
- Paul Rhys as Chapo
- John van Dreelen as Albert
- Jean-Pierre Aumont as Captain
- Lucienne Hamon as Sido
- Georg Tryphon as Creditor

== Production ==
The shooting was marked by the violence of Klaus Maria Brandauer towards Mathilda May, without intervention of the film crew to protect her.

== Release ==
The film was released in New York City on November 6, 1992.

== Reception ==
Joe Leydon of Variety gave the film a negative review and wrote, "Not even a twinkly eyed, scene-stealing turn by Klaus Maria Brandauer is enough to enliven Danny Huston's Becoming Colette ..."

Peter Rainer of the Los Angeles Times also gave the film a negative review and wrote, "The film, which was directed by Danny Huston and scripted by Ruth Graham, has an airless, disembodied quality—not exactly what one wants from a movie about a sensualist of genius."

Rita Kempley of The Washington Post also gave the film a negative review, describing it as "negligible".
