= Le Grand Pardon =

- Theatrical release poster
- Directed by: Alexandre Arcady
- Written by: Alexandre Arcady; Daniel Saint-Hamont; Alain Le Henry
- Produced by: Alexandre Arcady
- Starring: Roger Hanin; Richard Berry; Bernard Giraudeau; Gerard Darmon; Clio Goldsmith
- Cinematography: Bernard Zitzermann
- Edited by: Joële Van Effenterre
- Music by: Serge Franklin
- Production companies: Partner's Production; Odessa Films
- Release date: December 2, 1982
- Running time: 130 min
- Country: France
- Language: French

Le Grand Pardon (lit. 'The Great Forgiveness', French for Day of Atonement) is a 1982 French gangster film directed by Alexandre Arcady. It stars Roger Hanin as a crime boss whose organization and family are undermined by betrayals, and Richard Berry as his son and heir apparent; the cast also includes Bernard Giraudeau, Gérard Darmon, Jean-Louis Trintignant and Clio Goldsmith. The film has been occasionally called France's answer to The Godfather, with French North African Jews replacing Italian-Americans. A box-office success in France, the film was followed ten years later by a sequel, Le Grand Pardon II (also known under the English-language title Day of Atonement), in which Hanin, Berry, Darmon and several other actors reprised their roles.

== Plot ==
Raymond Bettoun, a pied-noir Jew, heads a crime family with the help of his son Maurice, his nephew Roland, and various members of his extended family. Controlling casinos, illegal gambling operations, and prostitution, he ruthlessly ousts his competitors—notably forcing his rival Carreras out of his casino in Biarritz. Police Commissioner Duché keeps a close watch on the activities of the Bettoun gang, having sworn to dismantle it.

Bettoun is unaware, however, that Pascal Villars, an ambitious, younger gangster, is looking to supplant him. With the help of a dangerous killer known as "the Sacristan," Villars incites conflict between the Jewish and Arab gangs.

As the situation deteriorates, Roland Bettoun begins to challenge the authority of his cousin Maurice, whom he deems too weak. A gang war erupts, fueling an escalation in violence and threatening the very existence of the Bettoun clan.

== Cast ==
- Roger Hanin as Raymond Bettoun
- Richard Berry as Maurice Bettoun
- Bernard Giraudeau as Pascal Villars
- Gérard Darmon as Roland Bettoun
- Jean-Louis Trintignant as Commissioner Jérôme Duché
- Clio Goldsmith as Viviane Atlan
- Jean-Pierre Bacri as Jacky Azoulay
- Richard Bohringer as Bernard van Eyck, a.k.a. "the Sacristan"
- Lucien Layani as Raphaël Atlan, a.k.a. "Grandpa"
- Anny Duperey as Carole
- Sam Karmann as William Benamou
- Jean Benguigui as Albert Zécri
- Armand Mestral as Freddy Ambrosi
- Blanche Ravalec as Colette Ambrosi
- Robert Hossein as Manuel Carreras
- Saïd Amadis as Larbi
- Philippe Sfez as Élie Bettoun
- Alexandre Aja (credited as Alexandre Jouan) as Alexandre
- Yves Mourousi as himself
- Serge Gainsbourg as himself

== Production ==
Although the film is not based on any specific individual, it loosely drew inspiration from the activities of the Zemmour brothers - real-life French-Jewish gangsters. After reading an article about the funeral of one of the brothers following a gang war, director Alexandre Arcady studied the workings of Jewish organized crime in Paris and decided that this could be an interesting, unconventional setting for a French gangster film. During production, the Zemmour brothers were unhappy with the publicity, and threatened Arcady. The French Minister of the Interior of the time, Gaston Defferre, intervened to defuse the situation.

== Reception ==
Le Grand Pardon was a box-office hit in France, selling 2,182,198 admissions upon release. It was also well received at the time by French critics. The film spawned a sequel ten years later, Le Grand Pardon II, which did not repeat the same commercial success. A 2025 review on the website dvdclassik noted that the film was not valued as highly as it deserved - perhaps due to the failure of its sequel, and to the public image of Roger Hanin who later became associated with the police series Navarro - but argued that it deserves re-evaluation as one of the best French crime films.

== Home media ==
The film was reissued on DVD, both as a standalone edition and as part of a three-DVD "trilogy" box set which includes its 1992 sequel and Le Grand Carnaval, another, unrelated film by Arcady that also stars Roger Hanin. It was also released on VOD on several streaming services including Canal+.
