= Félicité (1979 film) =

- Directed by: Christine Pascal
- Written by: Christine Pascal
- Produced by: Françoise Galfré; Alain Poiré
- Starring: Christine Pascal; Monique Chaumette; Paul Crauchet
- Cinematography: Yves Lafaye
- Edited by: Thierry Derocles
- Music by: Antoine Duhamel
- Production companies: Bloody Mary Productions; Les Films 2001
- Distributed by: Gaumont Distribution
- Release date: 23 May 1979
- Running time: 105 minutes
- Country: France
- Language: French

Félicité is a 1979 French film by Christine Pascal.

Pascal was the sole screenwriter of this film.
