= Elles ne pensent qu'à ça... =

- Theatrical release poster
- Directed by: Charlotte Dubreuil
- Written by: Charlotte Dubreuil; Georges Wolinski
- Starring: Claudia Cardinale; Carole Laure; Bernard Le Coq
- Cinematography: Carlo Varini
- Edited by: Luc Barnier
- Music by: Jacques Davidovici
- Distributed by: AFMD
- Release date: 1994
- Running time: 95 minutes
- Country: France
- Language: French

Elles ne pensent qu'à ça... is a 1994 French comedy film directed by Charlotte Dubreuil. It stars Claudia Cardinale, Carole Laure, and Bernard Le Coq. It was nominated for a Golden Kikito Award for Best Film at the Gramado Film Festival. The film is based on a comic by Georges Wolinski.

== See also ==
- List of French films of 1994
