= La Garce =

1984 French crime thriller film by Christine Pascal

- Film poster
- Directed by: Christine Pascal
- Written by: André Marc Delocque-Fourcaud; Pierre Fabre; Christine Pascal
- Produced by: Alain Sarde
- Starring: Isabelle Huppert; Richard Berry; Jean Benguigui; Vittorio Mezzogiorno
- Cinematography: Raoul Coutard
- Release date: 5 September 1984
- Running time: 90 minutes
- Country: France
- Language: French
- Box office: $3.9 million

La Garce is a 1984 French crime thriller film directed by Christine Pascal and starring Isabelle Huppert and Richard Berry.

== Cast ==
- Isabelle Huppert as Aline Kaminker / Édith Weber
- Richard Berry as Lucien Sabatier
- Vittorio Mezzogiorno as Max Halimi
- Jean Benguigui as Rony
- Jean-Claude Leguay as Brunet
- Jean-Pierre Moulin as Cordet
- Clément Harari as Samuel Weber
- Daniel Jégou as Dujarric
- Jenny Clève as Madame Beffroit
- Jean-Pierre Bagot as Monsieur Beffroit
- Madeleine Marie as Gouvernante de Weber
- Bérangère Bonvoisin as Lucien's wife
- Mado Maurin as Pasquet
- Philippe Fretun as Didier
- Vicky Messica as Nando
- Stéphanie Seilhean as Edwige
- Brigitte Guillermet as Brunet's secretary
- Michèle Moretti as The redhead
- Julie Malbequi as Little girl

== See also ==
- Isabelle Huppert on screen and stage
