= Day of Atonement (film) =

1992 film by Alexandre Arcady

Day of Atonement (Le Grand Pardon II)
- Theatrical release poster
- Directed by: Alexandre Arcady
- Written by: Marc Angelo; Alexandre Arcady; Daniel Saint-Hamont
- Produced by: Alexandre Arcady
- Starring: Roger Hanin; Richard Berry; Gerard Darmon; Christopher Walken; Jennifer Beals
- Cinematography: Willy Kurant
- Edited by: Martine Barraqué
- Music by: Romano Musumarra
- Production companies: Alexandre Films; TF1 Films Production; Ciby 2000; UGC; Canal+
- Release date: December 9, 1992
- Running time: 127 min
- Country: France
- Languages: French; English

Day of Atonement (original French title:Le Grand Pardon II) is a 1992 French gangster film directed by Alexandre Arcady, and starring Roger Hanin, Richard Berry, Gérard Darmon, Christopher Walken and Jennifer Beals. It is a sequel to the 1982 film Le Grand Pardon; several actors from the first film reprise their roles, including Hanin, Berry and Darmon.

== Plot ==
10 years after the events of Le Grand Pardon, former crime boss Raymond Bettoun is released from prison, just in time to attend his grandson's bar mitzvah in Miami, Florida. His son, Maurice, works there as a banker. Raymond soon finds out that Maurice has returned to the family's criminal ways and is laundering drug money.

Raymond's treacherous nephew Roland, believed dead by the rest of the family, hides on an island and pulls the strings, stealing from Maurice's bank with the complicity of his brother Elie.

Raymond tries to dissuade his son from continuing in crime, but to no avail. Maurice comes into contact with drug lord Pasco Meisner who wants to form an association with him. However, Maurice's plan goes horribly wrong when members of his family and organization are killed off or kidnapped by Pasco. Roland is also trying to get Maurice killed so he can appropriate the money from his bank.

== Cast ==
- Roger Hanin as Raymond Bettoun
- Richard Berry as Maurice Bettoun
- Gerard Darmon as Roland Bettoun
- Christopher Walken as Pasco Meisner
- Jill Clayburgh as Sally
- Jennifer Beals as Joyce
- Jean-Francois Stevenin as Eric Lemmonier
- Jean Benguigui as Albert Bettoun
- Raúl Dávila as Emilio Esteban
- Alexandre Aja as Alexander Bettoun
- Jim Moody as Danny Williams
- Amidou as Si Ali
- Armand Mestral as Freddy Ambrosi
- Cameron Watson as Tom
- Franck Khalfoun as Maurice's Bodyguard

== Production ==
Alexandre Arcady was prompted to make the film by his desire to work with Roger Hanin again. He had loosely based his 1982 film Le Grand Pardon on the activities of a real-life crime family, the Zemmour brothers. One of the brothers had emigrated to Miami, where he was eventually murdered. Arcady said that this probably gave him the idea to set the film's action in Florida. Filming locations included Miami and France.

== Soundtrack ==
The soundtrack to the film was recorded by Italian composer Romano Musumarra. The CD soundtrack was released in France for a limited time.

=== Track listing ===
1. Le Grand Pardon 2. Little Havana 3. Yir Yir Ibon 4. Viviane 5. Alton Road 6. Khemdati 7. Saruba 8. Flash Back 9. Dope Rever 10. Moon Ray 11. Ya Oummie Ya Oummi 12. Pasaumes

== Reception ==
Unlike the original 1982 film, Le Grand Pardon II was a box-office failure in France where it sold 391,765 admissions, much too low for its substantial budget. Critical reception was negative: Libération described the film as a "so bad it's good" unintentional comedy, noting that it dealt a very poor hand to its American guest stars, with an absurd seduction scene between Roger Hanin and Jill Clayburgh and a ridiculously over-the-top villainous role for Christopher Walken.

== Home media ==
The film was reissued on DVD, both as a standalone edition and as part of a three-DVD "trilogy" box set which includes the original 1982 film and Le Grand Carnaval, another film by Arcady starring Roger Hanin, that is otherwise unrelated. It wals also released on VOD on several streaming services including Canal+.
