= Spoiled Children (1977 film) =

1977 film

- Directed by: Bertrand Tavernier
- Written by: Charlotte Dubreuil; Christine Pascal; Bertrand Tavernier
- Produced by: Louis Wipf
- Starring: Michel Piccoli
- Cinematography: Alain Levent
- Edited by: Armand Psenny
- Music by: Philippe Sarde
- Distributed by: Gaumont Distribution
- Release date: 7 September 1977
- Running time: 113 minutes
- Country: France
- Language: French
- Box office: $3.3 million

Spoiled Children (French: Des enfants gâtés) is a 1977 French drama film directed by Bertrand Tavernier.

== Cast ==
- Michel Piccoli - Bernard Rougerie
- Christine Pascal - Anne Torrini
- Michel Aumont - Pierre
- Gérard Jugnot - Marcel Bonfils
- Arlette Bonnard - Catherine Rougerie
- Liza Braconnier - Danièle Joffroy
- Geneviève Mnich - Guite Bonfils
- Florence Haguenauer - Anne-Marie Clairon
- Claudine Mavros - La mère d'Anne
- Michel Berto - Muzard
- Thierry Lhermitte - Stéphane Lecouvette
- Georges Riquier - Mouchot
- Gérard Zimmermann - Patrice Joffroy (as Gérard Zimmerman)
- Michel Blanc - Le jeune homme de l'agence
- Brigitte Catillon - Valérie
- Martin Lamotte - Un ami d'Anne
- Michel Puterflam - Baraduc
- Daniel Toscan du Plantier - Le député
- Isabelle Huppert - La secrétaire du député (uncredited)
