= I'm Staying! =

- Directed by: Diane Kurys
- Written by: Florence Quentin
- Produced by: Alain Terzian
- Starring: Sophie Marceau; Vincent Perez
- Cinematography: Robert Alazraki
- Edited by: Francine Sandberg
- Music by: Paolo Buonvino
- Distributed by: Pathé Distribution
- Release date: 1 October 2003
- Running time: 102 minutes
- Country: France
- Language: French
- Budget: $11.2 million
- Box office: $4.6 million

I'm Staying! (French: Je reste!) is a 2003 French comedy film directed by Diane Kurys.

== Cast ==
- Sophie Marceau - Marie-Dominique Delpire
- Vincent Perez - Bertrand Delpire
- Charles Berling - Antoine
- Pascale Roberts - Mamyvonne, Marie-Do's mother
- François Perrot - J.C.
- Hardy Krüger Jr. - John
- Colette Maire - Geneviève
- Sasha Alliel - Antoine, the son
- Jean-Claude de Goros - Marie-Do's father
- Laurent Bateau - Bansart
- Jacques Duby - The neighbor
- Marie-France Mignal - The neighbor
