= Cocktail Molotov =

- Directed by: Diane Kurys
- Written by: Diane Kurys
- Screenplay by: Diane Kurys
- Produced by: Alexandre Films
- Starring: Elise Caron; Philippe Lebas; Francois Cluzet
- Cinematography: Philippe Rousellot
- Edited by: Joële Van Effenterre
- Music by: Yves Simon
- Distributed by: AMLF
- Release date: 6 February 1980
- Running time: 100 minutes
- Country: France
- Language: French
- Box office: $3.5 million

Cocktail Molotov is a 1980 French drama film written and directed by Diane Kurys. It is her second feature after Peppermint Soda. A female coming of age story set during the spring and summer of 1968, the film is not a sequel but can be considered a companion piece to its predecessor. It has been called a female take on the male-dominated road movie genre.

== Plot ==
Seventeen-year-old middle-class Anne (Elise Caron), runs away with her working-class boyfriend Frederic (Philippe Lebas) and his friend Bruno (Francois Cluzet) after a violent fight with her mother. Anne convinces the others to drive to Venice, where she plans to take a ship to Israel in order to join a kibbutz. On the road, Anne grapples with experiences of love, sex, abortion, and "existential wandering". Upon reaching Venice, they learn of the social uprising back in Paris. With their money running out and their car stolen, they hitchhike back to find they have missed the excitement.

== Cast ==
- Elise Caron as Anne
- Philippe Lebas as Frederic
- Francois Cluzet as Bruno
- Genevieve Fontanel as Anne's mother
- Henri Garcin as Anne's Stepfather
- Michel Puterflam as Anne's Father
- Jenny Cleve as Frederic's Mother
- Armando Brancia as Frederic's Father
- Malene Sveinbjornsson as Anne's Little Sister
- Stefania Cassini as Anna-Maria
- Frederique Meininger as Doctor
- Patrick Chesnais as Trucker
- Hélène Vincent as The diplomat's wife

== Reception ==
Cocktail Molotov did not do as well as Peppermint Soda, Kurys' critically acclaimed first feature released three years earlier. Film studies scholar Carrie Tarr has written that audiences may have been confused by Kurys treatment of May '68 as nearly devoid of protest and politics, instead focusing on an explicitly female personal drama, as opposed to the generally male-centered view of the student revolts. She also notes that Kurys had had to rewrite the script due to budget constraints which made reenacting the barricading of Paris streets impossible, and further cut explicitly political scenes out in the editing process to further emphasize the teenagers' story. Perhaps in a reaction to its lack of political content, Vincent Canby's 1981 review in The New York Times called the film "a nearly perfect example of the kind of French film that apotheosizes middle-class values while pretending to question them". While Tarr writes that the film does not depict abortion, love triangles, or the subjectivity of the female central character as well as other films, its autobiographical elements, its pairing of personal narrative with larger, historical events and other connections with the rest of Kurys' filmography mark it as an essential part of her work as auteur.
