= Le Petit Prince a dit =

Le Petit Prince a Dit
- Promotional poster
- Directed by: Christine Pascal
- Written by: Robert Boner; Christine Pascal
- Produced by: Robert Boner; Emmanuel Schlumberger
- Starring: Richard Berry; Anémone
- Cinematography: Pascal Marti
- Edited by: Jacques Comets
- Music by: Bruno Coulais
- Distributed by: Acteurs Auteurs Associés (France)
- Release date: 25 November 1992 (France)
- Running time: 115 minutes
- Countries: France; Switzerland
- Language: French

Le Petit Prince a Dit is 1992 French-Swiss drama film written and directed by Christine Pascal. The film follows an estranged Swiss couple who re-evaluate their relationship with the discovery of their daughter's terminal illness. It premiered on 3 September 1992 at the Montreal World Film Festival.

== Plot ==
A young girl, Violette goes to live with her grandmother after her parents, Adam and Mélanie separate. Thus she rarely gets an opportunity to see her busy parents. Her mother is concerned about her daughter's clumsiness and convinces her estranged husband to take her to see a doctor. The medical examination reveals that Violette has a brain tumour and is likely to die within a few months. Adam decides to take Violette on a road trip to Italy where her mother is rehearsing for a play. Violette disapproves of her father's new girlfriend and longs to see her parents reunited. Upon the realisation that Violette only has days left to live, Adam and Mélanie attempt to make their daughter's wish a reality.

== Cast ==
- Richard Berry as Adam Leibovich
- Anémone as Melanie
- Marie Kleiber as Violette Leibovich
- Lucie Phan as Lucie
- Mista Préchac as Minerve
- Claude Muret as Jean-Pierre
- Jean Cuenoud as Otto
- John Gutwirth as Victor

== Awards and nominations ==
- César Award for Best Film - nomination
- César Award for Best Director - Christine Pascal (nomination)
- César Award for Best Actor - Richard Berry (nomination)
- César Award for Best Actress - Anémone (nomination)

Montreal World Film Festival

- Best Actor - Richard Berry (won)
- Best Screenplay - Christine Pascal and Robert Boner (won)
- Louis Delluc Prize - Christine Pascal (won)
