= Nothing But Lies (1991 film) =

1991 film

- Directed by: Paule Muret
- Written by: Paule Muret
- Produced by: Bruno Pésery
- Starring: Fanny Ardant
- Cinematography: Renato Berta
- Edited by: Catherine Quesemand
- Release date: 11 December 1991
- Running time: 86 minutes
- Countries: France; Switzerland
- Language: French

Nothing But Lies (French: Rien que des mensonges) is a 1991 French-Swiss drama film directed by Paule Muret. It was entered into the 42nd Berlin International Film Festival.

== Cast ==
- Fanny Ardant as Muriel
- Alain Bashung as Adrien
- Jacques Perrin as Antoine, mari de Muriel
- Stanislas Carré de Malberg as Basile
- Christine Pascal as Lise
- Alexandra Kazan as Jo
- Jean-Pierre Malo
- Dominique Besnehard as Détective
