= Yves Simon (singer) =

French singer and writer (born 1944)

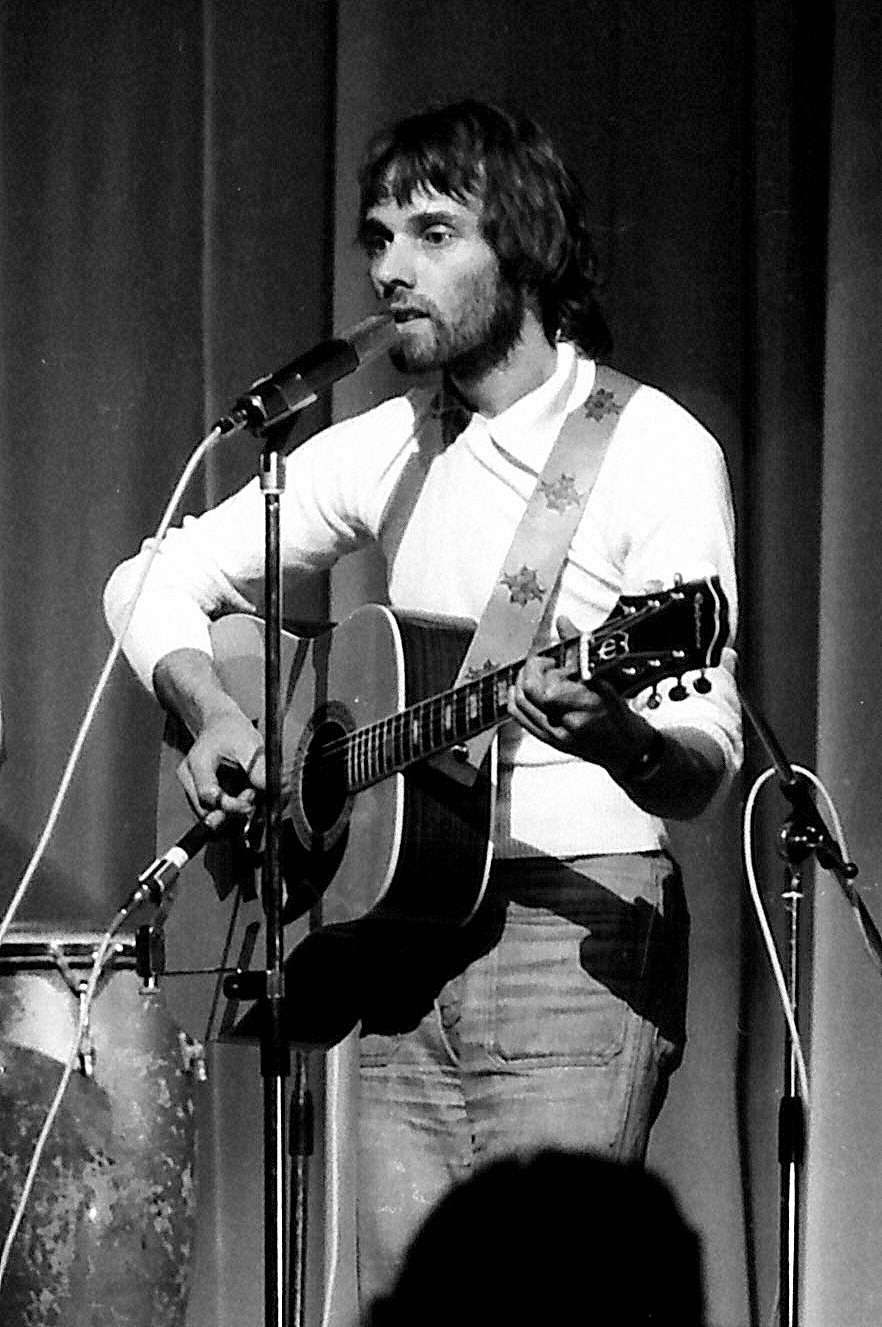
- Yves Simon in 1974
- Born: 3 May 1944; Choiseul, Haute-Marne, France
- Occupations: Singer, writer
- Years active: 1967–

Yves Simon (born 3 May 1944) is a French singer and writer. Simon has published over 30 books and released about twenty albums.

== Biography ==
Simon was born in 1944, in the old clergy house of Choiseul, France. His father was a rail worker in Contrexéville, and his mother was a waitress, and later a nurse. His parents gave him a diatonic accordion when he was eight years old. As a teen, he was the guitarist of a band based in Nancy, called "Korrigans nancéens".

In a television interview, he recalled having been fascinated at the age of 16 by the singer Salvatore Adamo, who had at the age of 17 just won the final of a competition and realised his dream of becoming a writer and singer.

He went to school in Mirecourt and, after having passed his baccalauréat, he enrolled at the faculté de lettres in Nancy. He then moved to Paris where he enrolled in university and in a preparatory class at the lycée Voltaire to gain a place at the IDHEC. After gaining his BA, he left Paris to explore Europe and the United States.

== Career ==
In 1967, he recorded three singles (Ne t'en fais pas petite fille, T'as pas changé tu sais, and Ne t'en fais pas petite fille). In 1969, he recorded La Planète endormie. These recordings remained relatively little-known, despite the success of Ne t'en fais pas petite fille.

At the same time as this, he wrote several novels. In 1971, he published En couleur and L'homme arc-en-ciel, which were met with success. He also worked for the magazine Actuel and for the radio station Europe 1.

Simon came to wide attention in 1972 with the release of Les Gauloises Bleues. After this, he was booked as the opening act for major artists such as Georges Brassens. His 1973 album, Au pays des merveilles de Juliet, won the prestigious 'Grand Prix de l'Académie du disque'. Respirer chanter was a success in 1974.

He retired from live concerts in 1977 but continued to release successful albums displaying a wide range of musical influences. In 1977, his soundtrack to Diane Kurys's film Diabolo Menthe was well received. His album USA-USSR (1983) met with success, and Liaisons was a hit in 1988. He also made some live concert appearances in Japan in 1982 and in France in 2007.

Simon's first best-selling novel was Océans in 1983. In 1991, Simon won the Prix Médicis, for his novel La Dérive des sentiments. His novel Le Prochain amour (1997) became successful, and a short story collection, Un instant de bonheur, published in 1998, won the 'Grand Prix de la chanson de l'Académie française'.

In his later career, Simon continued to compose music, but at a less regular rate, preferring to devote more time to his writing. In 1999 he released Intempestives, produced with Michel Cœuriot. The album is characterised by orchestral arrangements, and a mixture of rock, classical, and Arabian influences. His lyrics also became more engaged with real-world events. He told the story of Afghan women imprisoned by the Taliban in Kabul in Les Souffrantes and defended the criminal Florence Rey in Pardonnez. He described life in the banlieues in Des cités des pleurs, which speaks of dialogue between the East and the West. Other songs are more personal, such as Je te prie d'oublier. Je me souviens is an hommage to Georges Perec.

In 2007, he released Rumeurs. In July 2007, he reappeared on the live music scene after 30 years of absence at Francofolies de La Rochelle, and then at Spa.

On 12 March 2008, he played at the Olympia, giving a concert of more than two hours, mainly made up of the songs on his most recent album but also including classics such as Amazoniaque, J’ai rêvé New York, Diabolo menthe and Au pays des merveilles de Juliet. He paid homage to his influences: Georges Brassens, Serge Gainsbourg, Bob Dylan, The Rolling Stones and The Beatles. Serge Perathoner, his longtime collaborator, played the piano and the keyboard.

In 2011 he was one of the members of the jury for the Prix Françoise Sagan.

In 2014, Christine and the Queens covered his song Amazoniaque and sent Simon a copy. He played it to the head of Because Music, who proposed that he make an album of covers. In 2018 he released Génération(s) éperdue(s), a double album made up in part of his concert at the Olympia, and finished by his covers of the biggest hot songs of the new generation: Christine and the Queens, Woodkid, Clou, Flavien Berger, SoKo, Moodoid, Juliette Armanet, Lilly Wood and the Prick, Radio Elvis.

== Private life ==
He was in a relationship with comedian Pascale Rocard, before until 2015 being with painter, photographer and actress Patrice-Flora Praxo, to whom he devoted the songs La Métisse and Patrice on his album Rumeurs.

== Discography ==
=== Studio albums ===
- 1967: Ne t'en fais pas petite fille*
- 1969: La Planète endormie*
- 1973: Au pays des merveilles de Juliet
- 1974: Respirer, chanter
- 1975: Raconte-toi
- 1976: Macadam
- 1977: Un autre désir
- 1978: Demain je t'aime
- 1981: Une vie comme ça
- 1983: USA/USSR (Amazoniaque)
- 1985: De l'autre côté du monde
- 1988: Liaisons
- 1999: Intempestives
- 2007: Rumeurs

*Note – Simon considers Rumeurs to be his twelfth album, and therefore only counts his discography as beginning in 1973.

=== Live albums ===
- 1975: Concert au Théâtre de la Ville
- 1977: Concert à Tokyo
- 2018: Live à l'Olympia le 12 mars 2008 (avec l'album Génération(s) éperdue(s))

== Bibliography ==
- 1971 :
  - Les Jours en couleurs
  - L'Homme arc-en-ciel
- 1973 : Bagdad-sur-Seine / Photographs by Daniel Boudinet
- 1975 : Transit-Express
- 1978 : L'Amour dans l'âme
- 1983 : Océans
- 1985 : Tard dans la nuit / non-commercial, only 1,000 printed
- 1987 : Le Voyageur magnifique (prix des libraires 1988).
- 1988 :
  - Jours ordinaires (carnets)
  - Un autre désir (chansons)
- 1990 : Les Séductions de l'existence (François Bott / Dominique Grisoni / Roland Jacard / Yves Simon)
- 1991 : La Dérive des sentiments (prix Médicis 1991).
- 1993 : Sorties de nuit (carnets)
- 1996 : Le Prochain Amour
- 1997 :
  - La Ruée vers l'infini
  - Un instant de bonheur
  - Paravents de pluie / Photographs by André Mérian
- 1998 : Plaisirs ordinaires
- 1999 : Jours ordinaires
- 2000 :
  - Le Souffle du Monde
  - Paris aquarelles / dessins de Fabrice Moireau
- 2001 :
  - La Voix perdue des hommes
  - L'Enfant sans nom (children's book)
- 2003 : La Manufacture des rêves
- 2004 :
  - Les Éternelles
  - Lou Andreas-Salomé (Destins)
- 2005 : La Ruée vers l'infini (2)
- 2006 : Les Novices
- 2007 :
  - Je voudrais tant revenir
  - Épreuve d'artiste, dictionnaire intime (essay)
- 2009 : Jack London (essay)
- 2011 :
  - La Compagnie des femmes (prix Erckmann-Chatrian 2011)
  - Un homme ordinaire
- 2017 : Génération(s) éperdue(s) (collection)
- 2019 : Une vie comme ça (autobiography)
