= Entre Nous (film) =

1983 French film by Diane Kurys

- French film poster for Entre Nous
- Directed by: Diane Kurys
- Written by: Olivier Cohen (book); Diane Kurys (book); Alain Le Henry
- Produced by: Ariel Zeitoun
- Starring: Miou-Miou; Isabelle Huppert; Guy Marchand
- Cinematography: Bernard Lutic
- Edited by: Joële Van Effenterre
- Music by: Luis Enríquez Bacalov
- Distributed by: Gaumont Distribution
- Release date: 6 April 1983
- Running time: 110 minutes
- Country: France
- Language: French

Entre Nous ("Between Us"; also known as Coup de foudre) is a 1983 French biographical drama film directed by Diane Kurys, who shares the writing credits with Olivier Cohen. Set in the France of the mid 20th century, the film stars Isabelle Huppert, Miou-Miou, Guy Marchand, Jean-Pierre Bacri, Christine Pascal, Denis Lavant and Dominique Lavanant. Coup de Foudre means "love at first sight".

== Plot ==
In France in 1942, a young Jewish woman named Léna is interned by the Vichy authorities and faces the risk of deportation to Nazi Germany. Michel, one of the guards, offers to save her by marrying her. They escape on foot over the Alps to Italy. After the war, they settle in Lyon, where Michel opens a garage and Léna has two daughters with him. At a school event, she meets another mother, Madeleine, who is married with one son. The two women become close friends, and their husbands also get along, although both men secretly feel jealous of the bond their wives share.

Madeleine has a brief affair with her former art teacher, for which Léna lends her flat. Unfortunately, Michel comes home at lunchtime and discovers the guilty couple. This turns him against Madeleine and strains Léna's friendship with her. The two women had been planning to open a dress shop, and Michel offers to finance it on the condition that Madeleine is excluded, as she has gone off to Paris. Taking a night train to visit her, Léna has a sexual encounter with a soldier, her first experience apart from Michel, which she finds very enjoyable. In Paris, the two women dance, get drunk in a nightclub, and end up in bed together.

However, Léna fails to realise the fragility of Madeleine, who is eventually placed in a mental hospital and later released to the care of her parents. When Léna visits her, she takes Madeleine out to show her the new dress shop. Unfortunately, Michel drops by and upon seeing Madeleine there, he smashes the place up. Léna takes Madeleine and their children away to a rented house by the sea, where Michel tries to reconcile with her but without success. The end caption reveals that Léna never sees her husband again, and Madeleine dies two years later.

== Cast ==
- Miou-Miou as Madeleine Segara née Vernier
- Isabelle Huppert as Lena Korski née Weber
- Guy Marchand as Michel Korski
- Jean-Pierre Bacri as Costa Segara
- Robin Renucci as Raymond
- Patrick Bauchau as Roland Carlier
- Jacques Alric as Mr. Vernier
- Jacqueline Doyen as Mme. Vernier
- Saga Blanchard as Sophie
- Guillaume Le Guellec as René Segara
- Christine Pascal as Sarah
- Corinne Anxionnaz as 'unnamed'
- Jacques Blal as Lionel Feldman
- Bernard Cazassus as Le chef de gare
- Gérard Chambre as Flirt

== Reception ==
=== Critical response ===
Entre Nous has an approval rating of 100% on review aggregator website Rotten Tomatoes, based on 10 reviews, and an average rating of 8.3/10.

=== Box office ===
The film was a hit in France and grossed over $2 million in the United States.

=== Awards and nominations ===
==== Won ====
- San Sebastián Film Festival
  - FIPRESCI Prize (Diane Kurys)

==== Nominated ====
- Academy Awards
  - Best Foreign Language Film
- César Awards
  - Best Actor – Supporting Role (Guy Marchand)
  - Best Actress – Leading Role (Miou-Miou)
  - Best Film
  - Best Original Screenplay (Diane Kurys and Alain Le Henry)

== See also ==
- List of submissions to the 56th Academy Awards for Best Foreign Language Film
- List of French submissions for the Academy Award for Best Foreign Language Film
