= Peppermint Soda =

1977 film by Diane Kurys

- Theatrical release poster by Floc'h
- French: Diabolo menthe
- Directed by: Diane Kurys
- Written by: Diane Kurys; Alain Le Henry
- Produced by: Serge Laski
- Starring: Éléonore Klarwein; Odile Michel; Anouk Ferjac; Robert Rimbaud; Nadine Alari; Yves Rénier; Dora Doll
- Cinematography: Philippe Rousselot
- Edited by: Joële Van Effenterre
- Music by: Yves Simon
- Production companies: Les Films de l'Alma; Alexandre Films
- Distributed by: Gaumont Distribution
- Release date: 14 December 1977 (France)
- Running time: 97 minutes
- Country: France
- Language: French
- Budget: €360,000
- Box office: $22.6 million

Peppermint Soda (French: Diabolo menthe) is a 1977 French coming-of-age comedy-drama film co-written and directed by Diane Kurys. This autobiographical film was her directorial debut, and it won the Louis Delluc Prize at the 1977 Cannes Film Festival.

The film follows two teenage sisters over the course of the years 1963 and 1964, with the title referring to a grown-up carbonated beverage that the younger sister drinks in a café. The high school where the film takes place is the Lycée Jules-Ferry in Paris. The film is partly based on director Kurys's experiences and opens with a title card that states; "For my sister—who still hasn't given me back my orange sweater."

== Plot ==
In September 1963, 13-year-old Anne Weber and her 15-year-old sister Frédérique are spending the summer holiday with their newly divorced father on the coast. They then return to Paris, where they live with their mother, for the school year. The girls attend a strict all-girls school, the Lycée Jules-Ferry.

At school, the introverted Anne is an underachiever and is mocked by a teacher for a substandard drawing during art class. She is upset at her mother for not buying her stockings, since everyone else at the school wears them. Anne is also anxious to get her period because it signifies reaching womanhood, and so she pretends she has menstrual cramps despite not actually having begun her period. She and her friends discuss what they know about sex and humorously reveal their lack of knowledge about it. She also sneaks a look at the letters exchanged between Frédérique and her boyfriend Marc, and falsely claims to her school friends that Marc is her boyfriend.

Meanwhile, Frédérique begins to lose interest in Marc as she becomes more politically active around the issue of the Algerian War and her Jewish identity. Her new interest in activism causes a falling-out with her wealthy friend Perrine. Frédérique befriends the outspoken Pascale, a classmate who gives a horrific account to her class of a peaceful protest against far-right extremists that was violently broken up by French police.

Another of Frédérique's school friends, Muriel, runs away, and rumours and gossip abound as to where she might have gone. When visiting Muriel's worried father, the older man makes a pass at Frédérique just before she leaves the house. Muriel eventually returns briefly, revealing that she dropped out of school and now lives with a boyfriend on a farm. Frédérique also becomes involved in a school play. On the opening night of the play she stars in, her father attends, but to Frédérique's dismay, he does not stay afterwards to congratulate her. Some time later, the girls return to their father's home at the beach for the summer.

== Cast ==
- Éléonore Klarwein as Anne
- Odile Michel as Frédérique
- Anouk Ferjac as M^{me} Weber
- Michel Puterflam as M. Weber
- Yves Rénier as Philippe
- Robert Rimbaud as M. Cazeau
- Marie-Véronique Maurin as Muriel
- Corinne Dacla as Pascale
- Coralie Clément as Perrine
- Valérie Stano as Martine
- Anne Guillard as Sylvie
- Véronique Vernon as Evelyne
- Dora Doll as the Gymnastics teacher
- Françoise Bertin as the French teacher
- Jacqueline Doyen as Mlle. Petitbon
- Tsilla Chelton as the matron
- Nadine Alari as M^{me} censor
- Dominique Lavanant as the Maths teacher
- Marthe Villalonga as the English teacher
- Jacques Rispal as the school janitor
- Thérèse Quentin as M^{lle} Dumas

== Production ==
Diane Kurys had no prior directorial experience, saying prior to the film she had "never held a camera or even taken a still photograph." She conceived of the idea for the film when she "began thinking that there are a lot of films about adolescent boys, since most directors are men, but there are very few films about girls in high school and how they're raised. I decided to make this film out of my own memories." Kurys added, "But I didn't want to make adolescence a happy time. I wanted to show that it's difficult to be a 13-year-old girl, to want something desperately even if it's only a pair of pantyhose and to have nobody understand you."

Kurys received partial funding for the film through a grant program, in addition to the support of Gaumont. Kurys said, "[Gaumont] were very skeptical, as you can imagine, but at that time, I had such energy and conviction that they finally said, 'Maybe she's crazy, but let's give her a try.'" Kurys drew on her own experiences as a young adolescent, setting the film at the same lycée she attended and partly basing the characters on her real-life sister and herself. Filming began in August 1977.

Éléonore Klarwein was the same age as her character during filming. Klarwein, who had no previous acting experience, recalled the most challenging scenes for her to film were, "First, the one where I have my period, because I didn't have it in reality and because it touched on the intimate. Then, the one where I take a bath with my sister who puts her toes in my mouth. Disgusting. On top of that, I'm topless in the bathtub and it was embarrassing. Finally, the one where my sister makes me fall from a sofa: there, I hurt myself."

The film's music was composed by Yves Simon. Simon contributed the title song "Diabolo Menthe", which became successful in France.

== Release ==
Peppermint Soda was released in France on 14 December 1977, where it was a box office success, earning 70,000 admissions in its opening week and became an enduring classic. The film drew comparisons to Francois Truffaut's The 400 Blows (1959), another French coming-of-age film that was set in a similar time period. It won the Louis Delluc Prize at the 1977 Cannes Film Festival.

The film was released in North America on 15 July 1979 and was reviewed positively. Janet Maslin of The New York Times called it an "expert, utterly charming movie" that is "sweet and buoyant in its innocence." Kurys continued Anne's story in the 1980 film Cocktail Molotov, a companion piece which is set in 1968.

=== Re-release ===
The film was digitally restored by the Cohen Film Collection in 2018 for its 40th anniversary. Writing of the restored version, Robert Abele of the Los Angeles Times wrote, "Peppermint Soda is, like its summer-cooling namesake, a concoction that signifies childhood, a refreshment likely to spark a memory. Kurys' fondness for that time of fumbling and outgrowing is as fresh today as it was when it heralded a perceptive new filmmaking talent, especially because underneath these affectionately extracted remembrances is an unshakeable sisterly bond — of admiration, exasperation and watchfulness — that gives the story of Anne and Frédérique a deeper hold."

The 2K restoration was released on Blu-ray on 12 February 2019.

== Reception ==
Film critic John Simon described Peppermint Soda as "a nice film, except in its moments of high seriousness, which have a way of falling flat".

On review aggregator website Rotten Tomatoes, the film holds an approval rating of 91% based on 11 reviews, with an average rating of 7.3/10.
