= Saara Lamberg =

Saara Lamberg is a Finnish and Australian filmmaker, director, writer, producer and actor currently working in Australia. Their most notable work to date is the feature film Innuendo (written, directed and produced by Lamberg), which was released theatrically in October 2017 in Melbourne. Innuendo has been compared with works of David Lynch, Yorgos Lanthimos, and Roman Polanski Lamberg is non-binary.

== Biography ==
Lamberg was born in Helsinki, Finland, and they graduated from Kallio Upper Secondary School of Performing Arts at the age of eighteen. Lamberg studied in Dartington College of Arts, England, and graduated with a BA (HonsS) Theatre and Choreographic Practices degree in 2007. In 2010 they entered the new 'Artist in Residence' programme in Australia's oldest art centre, Montsalvat based in Eltham. and made Melbourne their home, becoming a dual citizen in 2014.

Lamberg won the Bronze prize at the Beverly Hills screenplay contest (Hollywood 2013), Best Actor at Comfy Shorts (Melbourne 2014), Best Drama at the Connect Film Festival (Melbourne 2014) and Best Actor (Lithuania 2004). Their first feature Innuendo won the Best Feature at the Fine Arts Film Festival in California and the Audience Award for Best Australian film by Cinema Australia. The film has its European premiere at the Rencontres Internationales du Cinéma des Antipodes in October 2017

The Movie Blog described Innuendo as "a very important piece of Aussie cinema", Film Ink "true original" and Chelle's inferno "an instant classic in Australian cinema".

Innuendo is distributed by Umbrella Entertainment in Australia and represented by Blairwood Entertainment for international sales.

Lamberg wrote, directed and produced five short films before they launched onto the production of Innuendo. In 2017 they also started the production of their second feature film, Westermarck Effect.
