= Charlotte Dubreuil =

French filmmaker and novelist (born 1940)

- Born: 27 April 1940 (age 85); Paris, France
- Occupations: writer, filmmaker
- Website: www.charlottedubreuil.com

Charlotte Dubreuil (born 1940) is a French filmmaker and novelist. After two small acting roles, Dubreuil turned her attention to writing and directing. She has written and directed several French films as well as produced two novels.

== Biography ==
Charlotte Dubreuil was born on 27 April 1940 in Paris She began her career as an actress, appearing in L'Humeur vagabonde (1972) under director Édouard Luntz with Jeanne Moreau and Michel Bouquet. The following year, she appeared in L'An 01 Beginning in 1974, she turned from acting to writing and directing films. Her first screenplay Pas si méchant que ça (1974) was co-written with Claude Goretta.

Her first solo screenwriting project was Qu'est-ce que tu veux Julie? (1976) which she also directed. The film was presented at the Festival du Film de Paris in 1976 and received good reviews. She followed that with Des enfants gâtés (1976) co-written with Bertrand Tavernier. In 1979, she wrote and directed two films: La Peine perdue ou le présent composé and Ma Chérie. In Ma Chérie, Dubreuil was working again with Édouard Luntz and co-wrote the film with him, which she directed. The film is a feminist view of a mother-daughter relationship.

In 1985, she directed La cote d'amour, written by Michel Contat and Ennio De Concini and starring Mario Adorf, Danièle Delorme, Geneviève Fontanel, Françoise Prévost. In 1994, she directed Elles ne pensent qu'à ça written by Georges Wolinski and starring Roland Blanche, Claudia Cardinale, Carole Laure, and Bernard Le Coq.

Beginning in 2000, Dubreuil became a published novelist. She released her second novel in 2007.

== Selected works ==
- La Restinga: Roman Paris: Albin Michel, (2000) (in French)
- Au cœur de l'Ombrière France: Éditions V.D.B., (2007) (in French)

== Filmography ==
=== Actress ===
- L'Humeur vagabonde (1972)
- L'An 01 (1973)
- Violence et passion (1974) voice dubbing

=== Screenplays ===
- Pas si méchant que ça co-written with Claude Goretta (1974)
- Qu'est-ce que tu veux Julie? (1976)
- Des enfants gâtés co-written with Bertrand Tavernier (1977)
- La Peine perdue ou le présent composé (1979)
- Ma Chérie co-written with Édouard Luntz (1979)

=== Directing ===
- Qu'est-ce que tu veux Julie ? (1976)
- La Peine perdue ou le présent composé (1979)
- Ma Chérie (1979)
- La Côte d'amour (1985)
- Elles ne pensent qu'à ça ! (1994)
