= Diane Kurys =

French filmmaker and actress (born 1948)

- Born: 3 December 1948 (age 77); Lyon, Rhône, France
- Occupations: Film director, actress, screenwriter, producer
- Years active: 1966–present
- Spouse: Alexandre Arcady
- Children: Sacha Sperling

Diane Kurys (French: [djan kyʁis]; born 3 December 1948) is a French director, producer, filmmaker and actress. Several of her films as director are semi-autobiographical.

== Personal life ==
Kurys was born in Lyon, Rhône, France, the younger of two daughters. She is a daughter of Russian and Polish Jewish immigrants, Lena and Michel. Diane Kurys and her older sister spent their early years in Lyon. Like many of her film's characters, she had a difficult relationship with her parents, and her traumatic childhood became a subject in many of her films. Their parents met and got married at Camp de Rivesaltes in 1942, separating in 1954. Their divorce deeply marked and affected Diane, and would become a real source of inspiration for several of her films; Kurys stated that she made films about them because she “wanted to see them back together again.” It was after this event that her mom decided to move with her two daughters to Paris, where she ran a woman’s fashion boutique, while her dad stayed in Lyon where he ran a men's clothing store. She lived with her mother after their divorce in 1954, at one point running away to join her father at age sixteen.

In her adolescence, she was radicalized in the spirit of May of '68, but became somewhat disillusioned in the aftermath, calling it a "revolution bourgeois" in an interview with Jean-Luc Wachthausen. She first met her partner and fellow filmmaker Alexandre Arcady when she was fifteen years old, in 1964, and went to live in Israel in a kibbutz near the Lebanese border. They have been a couple since the 1960s and have two production companies together. Their son Yasha, born in 1991, is an author writing under the name Sacha Sperling.

== Acting career ==
As a student at the Jules Ferry high school, she studied modern literature at the Sorbonne before becoming a teacher and then a theatre actress in the 1970s, joining the Madeleine Renaud: Jean-Louis Barrault's company with Antoine Bourseiller and Ariane Mnouchkine at La Cartoucherie or Cafe de la Gare.

After the student revolt in May 1968, Kurys left University and along with Arcady began her involvement in theatre; initially, with Kurys as an actor, and Alexandre as both an actor and director. She acted in theatre, film, and television for eight years. Kurys mentions how she loved the environment of acting but she was not happy doing it as she couldn’t express herself and was often seen as rebellious. She felt unable to express herself under "the director or any kind of authority or control." This led to her transitioning into writing and film making.

== Directorial career ==
In 1975, she worked with Philippe Adrien to adapt Lanford Wilson's play The Hot L Baltimore for French television, under the title Hôtel Baltimore, which she had previously performed at the Espace Cardin. The following year, she began writing an autobiographical novel, Diabolo menthe, which, with the aid of a government grant, she adapted into the screenplay for her directorial debut Peppermint Soda (1977). Set in 1963, it follows a girl named Anne losing her childhood innocence, exploring her life as a child of divorced parents and her relationship with her sister; Kurys dedicated the film to her real-life sister. In an interview, Kurys said her inspiration came "from myself, my own life, my own experience". The film was a critical and commercial success.

Kurys' next film, Cocktail Molotov, was released in 1980. Starring François Cluzet, Élise Caron and Philippe Lebas, the film portrayed the May 1968 Paris student movement through the point of view of three children: Anne, Frank, and Bruno. Though not a direct sequel, the film is considered a companion piece to Peppermint Soda, and was not as well-received.

Kurys again explored divorce in Entre Nous (Coup de foudre, 1983), this time from the maternal point of view, with Isabelle Huppert playing a mother who leaves her husband (Guy Marchand) and goes to Paris with her friend (Miou-Miou) and their children. The film, inspired by Kurys' own family history, honored the emotional manners and conventions of the nineteen-forties and -fifties, whilst depicting a feminist relationship atypical of the time. Kurys said that the film was her way "to allow them to live together once more - by putting them on screen together," as, in real life, her parents never saw each other again after the events depicted in the film. The film was extremely well-received, winning the FIPRESCI Prize at the San Sebastián Film Festival, and garnering several major awards nominations, including Best Film at the 9th César Awards and Best Foreign Language Film at the 56th Academy Awards.

Kurys opened the 40th edition of the Cannes Film Festival with A Man in Love (Une homme amoureux, 1987), her English-language debut. It follows an American film star (Peter Coyote) and an unknown British actress (Greta Scacchi) who meet on the set of a period drama in Rome. At the film's conclusion, Scacchi's character gives up acting to become a writer, echoing Kurys's own transition in life, though the film was her first to largely eschew autobiography, as well as her first contemporaneous film.

Kurys returned to autobiographical filmmaking with C'est la vie (La Baule-les-Pins, 1990), which featured a teenaged protagonist in the nineteen-fifties whose parents, played by Nathalie Baye and Richard Berry, are on the cusp of divorce. The film explored themes of feminine independence, adolescent sexuality and parental isolation. Kurys followed C'est la vie with the comedy Love After Love (Après l'amour, 1992) about a frustrated novelist, played by Isabelle Huppert, juggling affairs with two men, and Six Days, Six Nights (À la folie, 1994) which examined the relationship between two adult sisters, portrayed by Anne Parillaud and Béatrice Dalle, after the death of their mother. Both films were inspired by Kurys' observations of life in 1990s Paris.

Kurys next directed the period film Children of the Century (Les Enfants du siècle, 1999) a biographical drama based on the tumultuous love affair between two French literary icons of the 19th century, novelist George Sand (Juliette Binoche) and poet Alfred de Musset (Benoît Magimel). Kurys wished to move away from the autobiographical films that typified her career; she was drawn to the maturity of the characters and the untold nature of the story. Production often filmed in the actual locations once visited by Sand and Musset, and Sand's jewellery was loaned to Binoche by the writer's estate. An exhibition on the film was held at the Museum of Romantic Life in 1999. The film was ultimately met with a mixed reception.

Her ninth film, I'm Staying! (Je reste!, 2003), is a romantic comedy about a love triangle between engineer Bertrand (Vincent Pérez), his wife Marie-Do (Sophie Marceau), and her screenwriter lover Antoine (Charles Berling), who wind up living in the same apartment; surprisingly, Bertrand and Antoine get along as well as the lovers. The film received middling reviews from French critics. Two years later, Kurys made another comedy, The Anniversary (L'anniversaire, 2005), about a famed TV producer (Lambert Wilson) who reunites his old gang of friends after the publication of a novel that paints him in a negative light. The film features Pierre Palmade, Jean-Hugues Anglade, Zoé Félix, and Philippe Bas in supporting roles, and again received a middling critical response.

Four years later, in 2008, the biopic about Françoise Sagan called Sagan was released. Starring Sylvie Testud, Denis Podalydès, Pierre Palmade, Jeanne Balibar, Guillaume Gallienne, and Arielle Dombasle.

Her film For a Woman (Pour une femme, 2013) was shot in Lyon during the summer of 2012 with stars Benoît Magimel, Mélanie Thierry and Nicolas Duvauchelle. The film is about an affair from the point of view of the husband, inspired in part by her parents' messy marriage and divorce, and is a companion piece to her earlier film Entre Nous, which was from mother's point of view. The film won the Audience Special Mention at the 2014 CoLCoA French Film Festival.

In 2016, she produced and directed her thirteenth film, Arrête ton cinéma!, adapted from Sylvie Testud's book C'est le métier qui rentre, a comedy following a famous actress weighing an extravagant offer to make a film. The cast includes Josiane Balasko, Zabou Breitman, and Sylvie Testud.

Her film, My Mother is Crazy (Ma mère est folle, 2018), starring Fanny Ardant, Vianney, Patrick Chesnais and Arielle Dombasle, was written by Pietro Caracciolo and Kurys' son Sacha Sperling. It portrays the uneasy reunion of a mother and son while on a trip to Rotterdam.

Her film The One I loved (Moi qui t'aimais, 2025), a biopic of Simone Signoret and her relationship with Yves Montand, is part of the selection of the San Diego French Film Festival 2026.

=== Critical reception ===
Although Kurys' work as a filmmaker in the 1980s helped bring women's filmmaking into the mainstream of its time, her commercial successes have played a part in keeping her from being granted auteur status by many critics. Her harsher critics have called her films conventional, polished, and not challenging to cinema's status quo. In addition, her ambivalence toward feminism and dislike of the "woman director" or "women's cinema" label has played a part in her lack of feminist film study scholarship.

In a section on Kurys for French Film: texts and contexts and the first book-length study of Kurys work, film scholar Carrie Tarr argues that her work is firmly within the auteurist tradition, "a coherent body of work with a recognizable style". Kurys' use of her own life story, her inclusion of a stand-in for herself in most films, the recurring character types and situations from her memories and concerns in her present, all create a body of work specifically centered on a unique female voice. Tarr theorizes that Kurys' signature contains two voices, one which reflect her rebellion against the male-centric world she meant to escape by turning from acting to filmmaking, and the other which collaborates with the patriarchal structure she still must operate within to be successful.

== Production companies ==
Alexandre Films was formed in 1977 with Alexandre Arcady before the release of Peppermint Soda. The company co-produced her first six films as well as a number of Arcady's, whose name it bears. The pair formed New Light Films in 1994, which produces films in both French and English.

== Selected filmography ==
=== Director ===
Year	Title	Director	Writer	Producer	Notes
1977	Peppermint Soda (Diabolo menthe)	Yes	Yes	Yes	
1980	Cocktail Molotov	Yes	Yes	Yes	
1983	Entre Nous a.k.a. Coup de foudre	Yes	Yes	Yes	Nominated- Best Foreign Language Film
1987	A Man in Love (Un Homme Amoreux)	Yes	Yes	Yes	
1990	C'est la vie (La Baule-les-Pins)	Yes	Yes	Yes	
1992	Love After Love (Apres l'amour)	Yes	Yes	Yes	
1994	À la folie aka Six Days, Six Nights	Yes	Yes	No	
1999	The Children of the Century aka Les Enfants du siècle	Yes	Yes	Yes	
2003	I'm Staying! a.k.a. Je Reste!	Yes	Yes	No	
2005	L'anniversaire	Yes	Yes	Yes	
2008	Sagan	Yes	Yes	Yes	
2013	Pour une femme	Yes	Yes	No	
2016	Arrête ton cinéma	Yes	Yes	No	
2018	My Mother is Crazy (Ma Mere est Folle)	Yes	No	No	
2025	C'est Si Bon!	Yes	Yes	Yes	

=== Actress ===
Year	Title	Role	Notes
1972	Les petits enfants d'Attila	Herself	directed by Jean-Pierre Bastid fr
1972	Le bar de la fourche	Christie	directed by Alain Levent
1972	What a Flash!	Annie	directed by Jean-Michel Barjol fr
1973	Elle court, elle court la banlieue	Friend of Jean-Paul	directed by Gérard Pirès
1973	Poil de carotte	Agathe	directed by Henri Garziani fr
1974	Les Grands Détectives (TV series) fr	the pretty blonde	"Rendez-vous dans les ténèbres" directed by Jean Vautrin
1975	Les Brigades du Tigre (TV series) fr	Catherine	"Le défi" Season 2, episode 4
1975	Messieurs les Jurés (TV series) fr	Sylvie Radet	"L'affaire Lambert"
1975	Le Père Amable	Phémie	TV movie based on short story by Guy de Maupassant
1975	La Mémoire	The girl	short film directed by Gébé fr as Georges Blondeaux
1976	F comme Fairbanks	Annick	directed by Maurice Dugowson
1976	Hôtel Baltimore	The girl	TV movie directed by Alexandre Arcady Lanford Wilson's play adapted by Kurys and Philippe Adrien
1976	Fellini's Casanova	Madame Charpillon	directed by Federico Fellini
1977	Commissaire Moulin de Klaus Biedermann (TV series) fr		directed by Jacques Trébouta
1977	Les Cinq Dernières Minutes Fr	Julienne	directed by Guy Lessertisseur

== Literature ==
- Carrie Tarr: Diane Kurys. Manchester University Press, New York, 1999, ISBN 978-0719050954
