= The Tit and the Moon =

1994 Spanish/French film directed by Bigas Luna

- Directed by: Bigas Luna
- Written by: Cuca Canals; Bigas Luna; Frédéric Lasaygues; Josep Bargalló
- Produced by: Andrés Vicente Gómez
- Cinematography: José Luis Alcaine
- Edited by: Carmen Frías
- Music by: Nicola Piovani
- Distributed by: United International Pictures
- Release date: 1994 (Spain)
- Running time: 90 minutes
- Countries: Spain; France
- Languages: Spanish; French; Catalan

The Tit and the Moon (Spanish: La Teta y la luna) is a 1994 Spanish/French film, directed by Bigas Luna. It entered the competition at the 51st Venice International Film Festival.

== Plot ==
Tete, a nine-year-old boy, is obsessed with women's breasts and with breastfeeding. He becomes jealous of his baby brother who is breastfed by their mother, and begins searching for the perfect pair of lactating breasts to feed on. Estrellita (Mathilda May), a beautiful French dancer, arrives in town as part of a travelling performing act, and Tete fixates on her. Estrellita is the attention of many men's affections including her husband Maurice (Gérard Darmon) and Flamenco-singing teenager Miguel (Miguel Poveda).

== Cast ==
- Biel Durán as Tete
- Mathilda May as Estrellita
- Gérard Darmon as Maurice
- Miguel Poveda as Miquel
- Abel Folk as Father
- Laura Mañá as Mare
- Genís Sánchez as Stallone
- Xavier Massé as El Abuelo
- Victoria Lepori as La de las tetas
- Xus Estruch as La madre de Stallone
- Jane Harvey as La Caballé
- Vanessa Isbert as Novia de Stallone
- Jordi Busquets as Cap Colla
- Salvador Anglada as Casteller
- Javier Bardem (small, uncredited role)
