= Richard Berry (actor) =

French actor and director (born 1950)

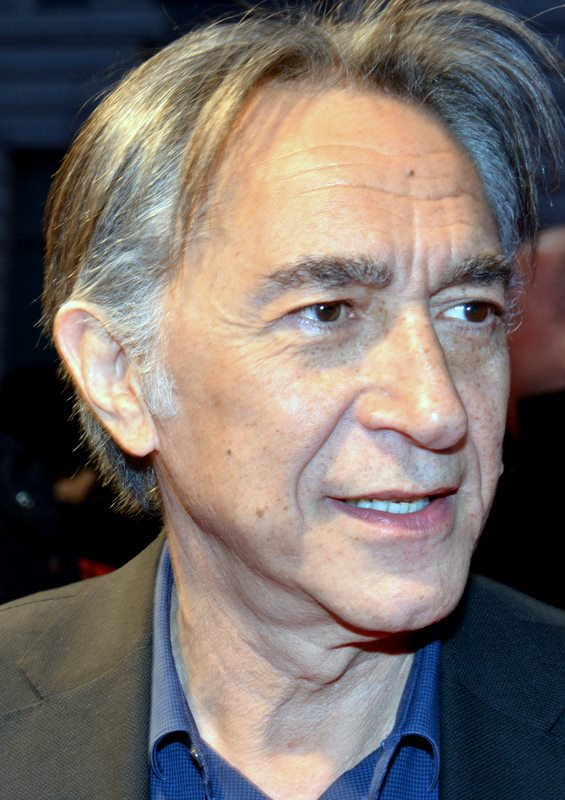
- Berry in 2015
- Born: Richard Élie Benguigui; 31 July 1950 (age 76); Paris, France
- Occupations: Actor; Film director Screenwriter
- Years active: 1972–present
- Children: 3

Richard Berry (French pronunciation: [ʁiʃaʁ bɛʁi]; born Richard Élie Benguigui, 31 July 1950) is a French actor, film director and screenwriter. He has appeared in more than 100 films since 1972. He starred in The Violin Player, which was entered into the 1994 Cannes Film Festival.

== Personal life ==
He is born in an oranian Jewish family, in French Algeria. His father Moïse Benguigui changed his name to Maurice Berry when Richard was 14. He grew up in the 2nd arrondissement of Paris, then in Boulogne-Billancourt. He joins at 16 a troupe of amateur comedians.

He has a daughter, Coline, born 1976, from his relationship with actress Catherine Hiegel. He married singer and actress Jeane Manson in 1984. The couple divorced in 1986. With his former wife Jessica Forde, a photographer and actress, he has a daughter, actress Joséphine Berry, born in 1992.

Since 2009, he has been in a relationship with actress Pascale Louange, with whom he has a daughter, born in 2014.

In 2005, he made headlines for donating one of his kidneys to his sister Marie Berry, who was born with Alport syndrome, a genetic kidney disease.

His brother, Philippe Berry, is a sculptor and the former husband of actress Josiane Balasko.

=== Allegations of sexual abuse ===
On 2 February 2021, it was revealed that Berry's daughter Coline had recently filed a complaint with Paris prosecutors alleging incest and sexual abuse by Berry. In a story on his Instagram account, Berry claimed Coline made the allegation for the first time seven years prior, writing: "As I announced to my family (in 2014) that my wife and I were expecting a child, Coline, herself pregnant, reacted with extreme violence, then, in an email sent to my wife, she for the first time alluded to the fact that she [had] been 'abused.'"

== Selected filmography ==
Year	Title	Director	Writer	Notes
1994	3000 scénarios contre un virus	Yes		Segment: "Préservatif, une preuve d'amour"
2001	L'Art (délicat) de la séduction	Yes	Yes	
2003	I, Cesar	Yes	Yes	
2005	La Boîte noire	Yes	Yes	
2010	22 Bullets	Yes	Yes	
2014	L'Esprit de famille		Yes	Telefilm; original idea
2015	Nos femmes	Yes	Yes	
2016	Tout, tout de suite	Yes	Yes	

Acting credits

- Mon premier amour (1978)
- Un assassin qui passe (1981)
- Le Grand Pardon (1982)
- Une chambre en ville (1982)
- La Balance (1982)
- L'Addition (1984)
- La Garce (1984)
- Urgence (1985)
- Spécial Police (1985)
- Honeymoon (1985)
- A Man and a Woman: 20 Years Later (1986)
- Migrations (1988)
- L'union sacrée (1989)
- Mayrig (narrator)
- L'entraînement du champion avant la course (1991)
- Pour Sacha (1991)
- Shadows of the Past (1991)
- My Life Is Hell (1991)
- Le Grand Pardon II (1992)
- 588 rue paradis (1992)
- Le Petit prince a dit (1992)
- The Violin Player (1994)
- L'Appât (1995)
- Adultery: A User's Guide (1995)
- Pédale douce (1996)
- Les Agneaux (1996)
- Un grand cri d'amour (1998)
- Quasimodo d'El Paris (1999)
- Les gens qui s'aiment (1999)
- 15 August (2001)
- Break of Dawn (2002)
- If I Were a Rich Man (2002)
- Tais-toi ! (2003)
- La Boîte noire (2005)
- L'emmerdeur (2008)
- Cliente (2008)
- 22 Bullets (2010)
- Nos femmes (2015)
- The Origin of Violence (2016)
- Tout, tout de suite (2016)
- Number One (2017)
- Eva (2018)
- To Each, Her Own (2018)
