= Alexandre Arcady =

Film actor and director

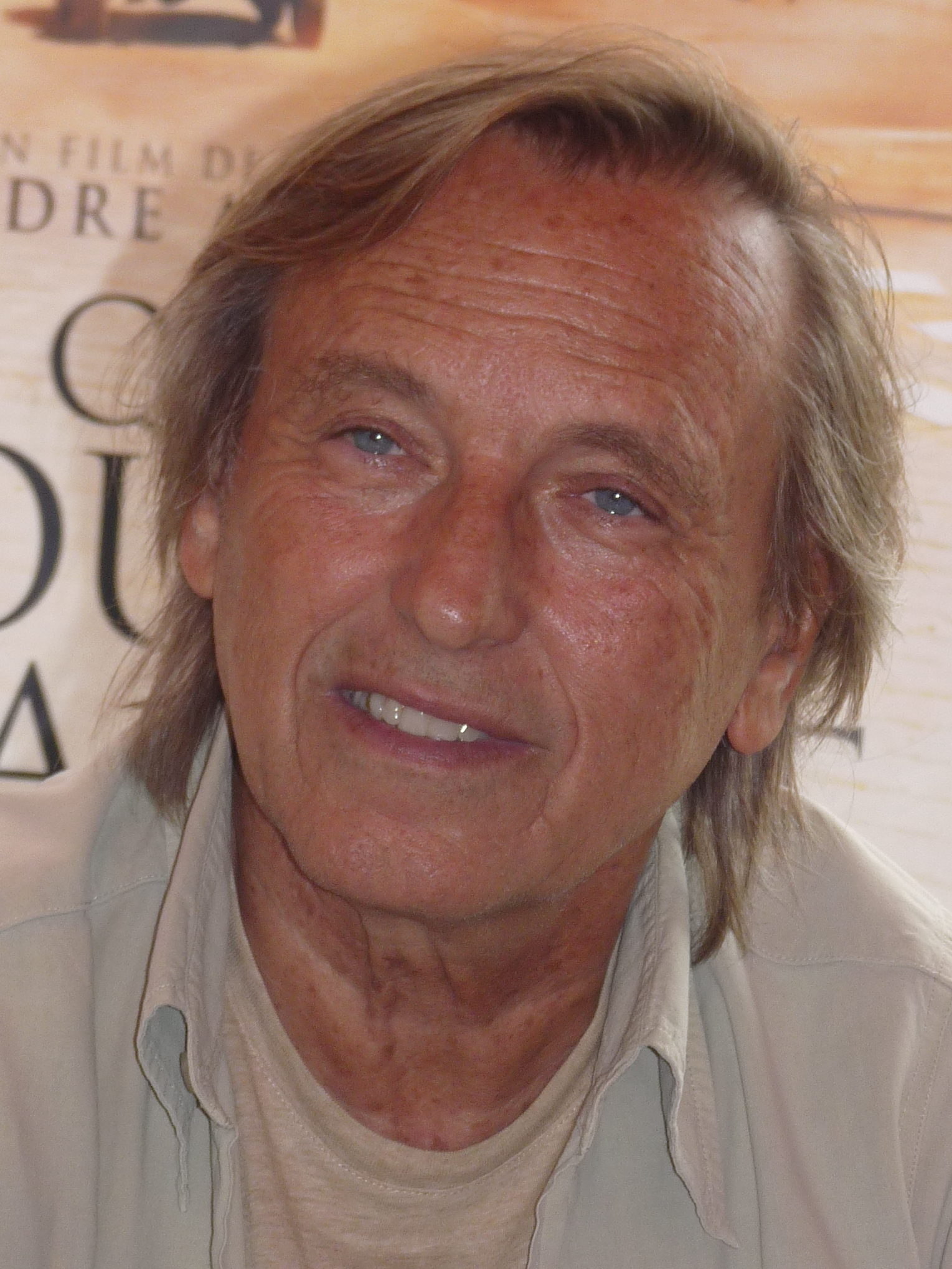
- Arcady in 2012
- Born: 17 March 1947 (age 78); Algiers, Algeria
- Occupation(s): Film director, screenwriter, producer
- Years active: 1979–present
- Spouse: Diane Kurys
- Children: Alexandre Aja; Sacha Sperling

Alexandre Arcady (born 17 March 1947) is a French actor, film director, producer and screenwriter.

== Life and career ==
Alexandre Arcady was born in Algiers, Algeria. He emigrated to France at the age of fifteen. His son is filmmaker Alexandre Aja.

== Filmography ==
Year	Title	Director	Producer
1979	Le Coup de sirocco	Yes	No
1982	Le Grand Pardon	Yes	No
1983	Le Grand Carnaval	Yes	No
1985	Hold-Up	Yes	No
1987	Last Summer in Tangiers	Yes	Yes
1989	L'union sacrée	Yes	Yes
1990	C'est la vie	No	Yes
1991	Pour Sacha	Yes	No
1992	Day of Atonement (Le Grand Pardon II)	Yes	Yes
1994	À la folie	No	Yes
1995	Dis-moi oui...	Yes	Yes
1997	K	Yes	No
1999	Furia	No	Yes
2000	Return to Algiers	Yes	Yes
2002	Break of Dawn	Yes	Yes
2003	High Tension	No	Yes
2004	Mariage mixte	Yes	Yes
2005	L'anniversaire	No	Yes
2008	Tu peux garder un secret?	Yes	Yes
2010	Comme les cinq doigts de la main	Yes	Yes
2012	What the Day Owes the Night	Yes	No
2012	Ce que le jour doit à la nuit	No	Yes
2014	24 Days	Yes	Yes
2016	Arrête ton cinéma	No	Yes
2023	Le Petit Blond de la Casbah	Yes	No

Actor

- To Be Twenty in the Aures (1972)
- César and Rosalie (1972)
- Arrête ton cinéma (2016)
