= Bigas Luna =

Spanish film director, designer and artist (1946–2013)

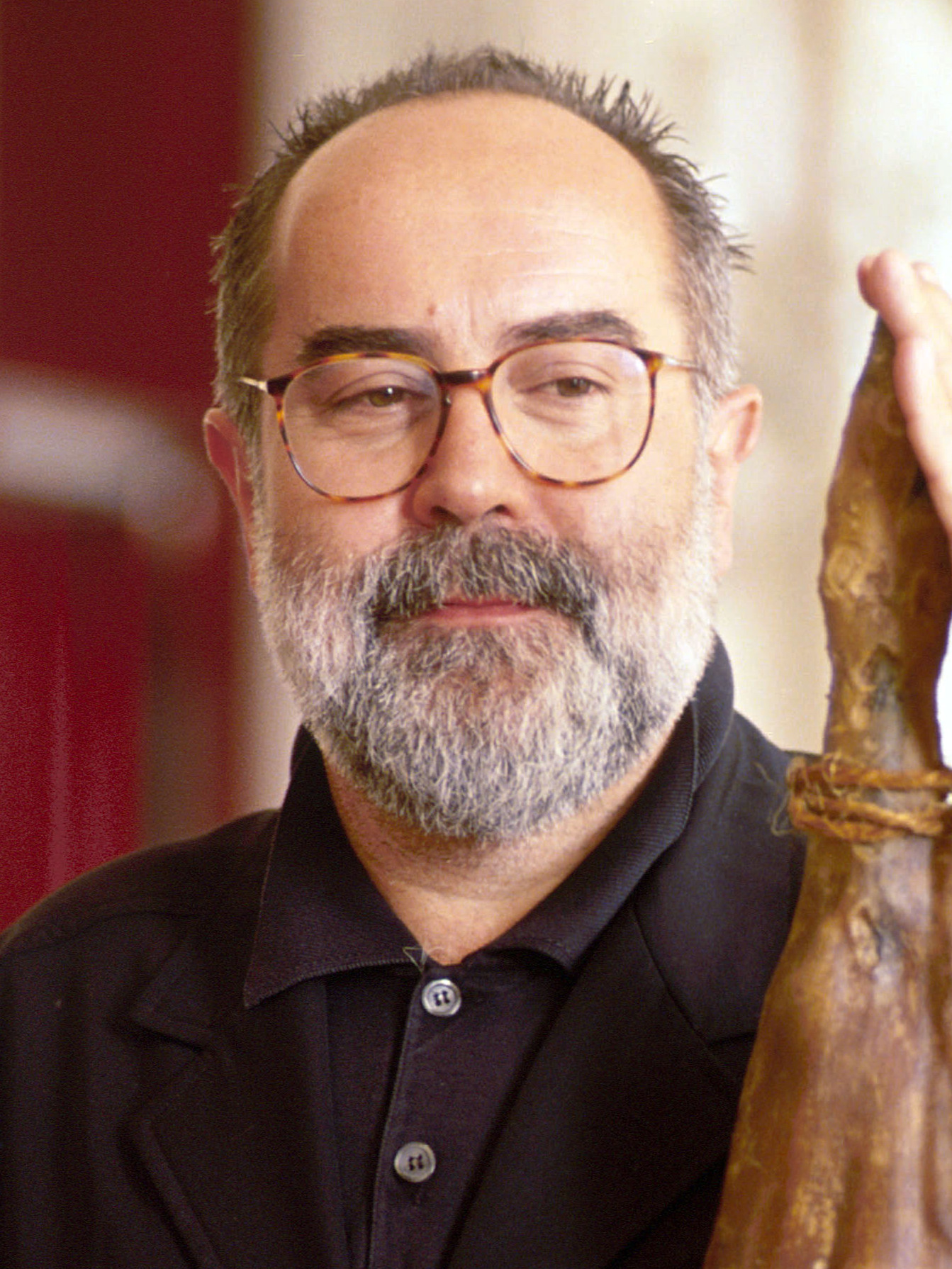
- Bigas Luna in 1992
- Born: José Juan Bigas Luna; 19 March 1946; Barcelona, Spain
- Died: 6 April 2013 (aged 67); La Riera de Gaià, Catalonia, Spain
- Other name: Juan José Bigas Luna
- Occupation: Film director

José Juan Bigas Luna (19 March 1946 – 5 April 2013) was a Spanish film director, designer and artist. His films are typically characterised by a strong emphasis on the erotic, often related to food, something for which he admitted a strong passion. His work often explores and parodies clichés of Spanish identity, but he had an international career and made films in Spanish, Catalan, Italian, French and English.

== Biography ==
=== Early career ===
Bigas Luna was born on March 19, 1946, in Barcelona.

He began his professional career working in interior and industrial design, creating the Estudio Gris with Carlos Riart in 1969. His designs during the 1960s showed a great interest in conceptual art and the emerging visual technologies. He won the Gold Delta Award ADI/FAD 1970.

He moved into movie making in the 1970s, making low-budget shorts with erotic themes. In 1976 he shot his first feature film, Tattoo, achieving notoriety in 1978 with the sexually explicit Bilbao, which was selected for the Cannes Film Festival.

=== Organic farm ===
In 1986 he retired to Tarragona in order to devote his time to painting, while raising his three daughters. He and his wife Celia ran an organic farm which produced wine, ham and other organic products. Luna enjoyed the life of a bon vivant.

=== Return to film ===
In 1990 the producer Andrés Vicente Gómez persuaded him to return to cinema and entrusted to him the direction of Las edades de Lulú (The Ages of Lulu), an erotic drama about a young woman exploring extreme sexual practices. This was a commercial success. Without abandoning his dedication to painting and photography, reflected in numerous exhibitions, he began the well-known "Iberian Trilogy" with Jamón Jamón ("Ham, Ham", 1992), Huevos de Oro ("Golden Balls", 1993) and La teta y la luna ("The Tit and the Moon", 1994), winning the Golden Osella for the latter film. These films "explored the darkest depths of eroticism and stereotypical Spanish machismo." Jamón Jamón, which launched the careers of both Javier Bardem and the 16-year-old Penélope Cruz was a major international success and won the Silver Lion at Venice in 1992. Cruz returned in Volavérunt (1999), a film about the relationship between Francisco Goya and the Duchess of Alba.

Subsequently, with the short film for the internet Collar de Moscas (2001), he revived his interest in avant-garde experimentation and audiovisual formats and at the same time he discovered a vocation for the investigation of digital cinema after the creation of the Taller Bigas Luna project with Catalina Pons in 1999. The experience in the Taller introduced them to the world of new technologies and in 2002 they promoted PLATAFORM BL, dedicated to the creation and promotion of innovative projects and new talents.

=== Other projects ===
Bigas Luna's career as a filmmaker, painter and designer made him a singular and interdisciplinary artist. His project called "Microcosmos" an evolution of the earlier Cares de l'Ànima which was exhibited in the Galería Metropolitana de Barcelona in 1990, can be seen as an example of this. It can now be found on a web site (see external links below), where the visitor can modify and select the works.

Bigas Luna directed and produced a large-scale multimedia installation for the Spain Pavilion at Shanghai Expo 2010, named Origins, as the first part of the Pavilion's trilogy on exhibition. The installation fused live Flamenco dance, sculpture and videos on more than 20 projectors.

From 2008 to 2012, Bigas took on the art direction of the oldest musical café in Europe, El Plata, in Zaragoza (Spain). There, he created a cabaret show classified as "Cabaret Ibérico" based on parodies, eroticism, the old burlesque, etc., accompanied by the typical dishes from Spain, such as paella, ham or Spanish omelette.

== Death ==
Bigas Luna died of leukemia on 5 April 2013, while working on the film adaptation of Manuel de Pedrolo's novel Mecanoscrit del segon origen.

== Filmography ==
- Tatuaje (1976), director
- Historias impúdicas (1977), director
- Bilbao (1978), director
- Caniche (1979), director
- Reborn (1981), director
- Lola (1986), director
- Anguish (1987), writer and director
- The Ages of Lulu (Las edades de Lulú) (1990), director
- Ham, Ham (Jamón, jamón) (1992), director
- Golden Balls (Huevos de oro) (1993), director
- The Tit and the Moon (La teta y la luna) (1994), director
- Lumière et compagnie (1996), director
- Bambola (Bámbola) (1996), director
- The Chambermaid on the Titanic (La Femme de chambre du Titanic) (1997), director
- They Flew Away (Volavérunt) (1999), director
- Sound of the Sea (Son de mar (2001), director
- My Name Is Juani (Yo soy la Juani) (2006), director
- Di Di Hollywood (2010), director
