= 9th César Awards =

1984 French film awards ceremony

- Date: 3 March 1984
- Site: Théâtre de l'Empire, Paris, France
- Hosted by: Léon Zitrone

Highlights
- Best Film: Le Bal & À nos amours
- Best Actor: Coluche
- Best Actress: Isabelle Adjani

Television coverage
- Network: Antenne 2

The 9th César Awards ceremony, presented by the Académie des Arts et Techniques du Cinéma, honoured the best French films of 1983 and took place on 3 March 1984 at the Théâtre de l'Empire in Paris. The ceremony was chaired by Gene Kelly and hosted by Léon Zitrone. Le Bal and À nos amours tied for the award for Best Film.

== Winners and nominees ==
The winners are highlighted in bold:

- Best Film:
  **Le Bal**, directed by Ettore Scola
  **À nos amours**, directed by Maurice Pialat
  Coup de foudre, directed by Diane Kurys
  Tchao pantin, directed by Claude Berri
  L'Été meurtrier, directed by Jean Becker
- Best Foreign Film:
  **Fanny and Alexander**, directed by Ingmar Bergman
  Carmen, directed by Carlos Saura
  The Gods Must Be Crazy, directed by Jamie Uys
  Tootsie, directed by Sydney Pollack
- Best First Work:
  **Rue cases nègres**, directed by Euzhan Palcy
  Le Dernier Combat, directed by Luc Besson
  Le Destin de Juliette, directed by Aline Issermann
  La Trace, directed by Bernard Favre
- Best Actor:
  **Coluche**, for Tchao pantin
  Gérard Depardieu, for Les Compères
  Yves Montand, for Garçon!
  Michel Serrault, for Mortelle randonnée
  Alain Souchon, for L'Été meurtrier
- Best Actress:
  **Isabelle Adjani**, for L'Été meurtrier
  Miou-Miou, for Coup de foudre
  Nathalie Baye, for J'ai épousé une ombre
  Nicole Garcia, for Les Mots pour le dire
  Fanny Ardant, for Vivement dimanche!
- Best Supporting Actor:
  **Richard Anconina**, for Tchao pantin
  Guy Marchand, for Coup de foudre
  Bernard Fresson, for Garçon!
  Jacques Villeret, for Garçon!
  François Cluzet, for L'Été meurtrier
- Best Supporting Actress:
  **Suzanne Flon**, for L'Été meurtrier
  Victoria Abril, for La Lune dans le caniveau
  Stéphane Audran, for Mortelle randonnée
  Agnès Soral, for Tchao pantin
  Sabine Azéma, for La vie est un roman
- Most Promising Actor:
  **Richard Anconina**, for Tchao pantin
  Jacques Penot, for Au nom de tous les miens
  Jean-Hugues Anglade, for L'Homme blessé
  François Cluzet, for Vive la sociale!
- Most Promising Actress:
  **Sandrine Bonnaire**, for À nos amours
  Laure Duthilleul, for Le Destin de Juliette
  Agnès Soral, for Tchao pantin
  Élisabeth Bourgine, for Vive la sociale!
- Best Director:
  **Ettore Scola**, for La Bal
  Claude Berri, for Tchao pantin
  François Truffaut, for Vivement dimanche!
  Maurice Pialat, for À nos amours
  Jean Becker, for L'Été meurtrier
- Best Original Screenplay:
  **Hervé Guibert, Patrice Chéreau**, for L'Homme blessé
  Francis Veber, for Les Compères
  Diane Kurys, Alain Le Henry, for Coup de foudre
- Best Adaptation:
  **Sébastien Japrisot**, for L'Été meurtrier
  Robert Enrico, for Au nom de tous les miens
  Claude Berri, for Tchao pantin
- Best Cinematography:
  **Bruno Nuytten**, for Tchao pantin
  Ricardo Aronovich, for Le Bal
  Philippe Rousselot, for La Lune dans le caniveau
  Pierre Lhomme, for Mortelle randonnée
- Best Sound:
  **Jean Labussière, Gérard Lamps**, for Tchao pantin
  Jean-Louis Ughetto, Luc Yersin, for L'Argent
  Jacques Maumont, Pierre Lenoir, for Garçon!
  Nadine Muse, Paul Lainé, Maurice Gilbert, for Mortelle randonnée
- Best Editing:
  **Jacques Witta**, for L'Été meurtrier
  Françoise Prenant, for Faits divers
  Françoise Bonnot, for Hanna K.
  Denise de Casabianca, for L'Homme blessé
  Claire Pinheiro, for Les Mots pour le dire
- Best Music:
  **Vladimir Cosma**, for Le Bal
  Charlélie Couture, for Tchao pantin
  Serge Gainsbourg, for Équateur
  Georges Delerue, for L'Été meurtrier
- Best Production Design:
  **Hilton McConnico**, for La Lune dans le caniveau
  Jean-Pierre Kohut-Svelko, for Mortelle randonnée
  Alexandre Trauner, for Tchao pantin
  Jacques Saulnier, for La vie est un roman
- Best Animated Short:
  **Le Voyage d'Orphée**, directed by Jean-Manuel Costa
  Au-delà de minuit, directed by Pierre Berletta
  Le Sang, directed by Jacques Rouxel
- Best Fiction Short Film:
  **Star suburb: La banlieue des étoiles**, directed by Stéphane Drouot
  Coup de feu, directed by Magali Clément
  Panique au montage, directed by Olivier Esmein
  Toro Moreno, directed by Gérard Krawczyk
- Best Documentary Short Film:
  **Ulysse**, directed by Agnès Varda
  Je sais que j'ai tort mais demandez à mes copains ils disent la même chose, directed by Pierre Levy
  La Vie au bout des doigts, directed by Jean-Paul Janssen
- Best French Language Film:
  **Dans la ville blanche**, directed by Alain Tanner
- Honorary César:
  **René Clément**
  **Georges de Beauregard**
  **Edwige Feuillère**

== See also ==
- 56th Academy Awards
- 37th British Academy Film Awards
