= The Lady in the Car with Glasses and a Gun =

The Lady in the Car with Glasses and a Gun may refer to:

- The Lady in the Car with Glasses and a Gun (novel), a mystery-thriller novel by Sebastien Japrisot
- The Lady in the Car with Glasses and a Gun (1970 film), a French and American psychological thriller film
- The Lady in the Car with Glasses and a Gun (2015 film), a French-Belgian thriller film
