= Trap for Cinderella =

Trap for Cinderella may refer to:

- Trap for Cinderella (novel), by Sébastien Japrisot, 1962
- Trap for Cinderella (1965 film), a French adaptation of the novel, directed by André Cayatte
- Trap for Cinderella (2013 film), a British adaptation of the novel, directed by Iain Softley
