= Serge Silberman =

French film producer (1917–2003)

Serge Silberman (1 May 1917 – 22 July 2003) was a French film producer known for his collaborations with several major European and Japanese filmmakers, including Luis Buñuel, Jess Franco, Akira Kurosawa, Jean-Pierre Melville, René Clément, Jacques Becker, and Nagisa Oshima.

== Early life ==
Silberman was born in Łódź, then a part of the Regency Kingdom of Poland, to a Jewish family.

During World War II, Silberman survived Nazi concentration camps and eventually settled in Paris.

== Career ==
One of his first works as a film producer was Jean-Pierre Melville's 1955 film Bob the Gambler, a precursor to the French New Wave movement.

Silberman's most notable collaborations were with the surrealist film director Luis Buñuel. The pair, along with screenwriter Jean-Claude Carrière, who Silberman introduced to Buñuel, worked together on a number of films, starting with the 1964 film Diary of a Chambermaid. Silberman produced most of Buñuel's late films, including the Academy Award winner The Discreet Charm of the Bourgeoisie in 1972 and the director's last film That Obscure Object of Desire in 1977.

Silberman founded his own production company, Greenwich Film Productions, in 1966. The company was responsible for the production of over 15 films. In 1981, Silberman produced his most financially successful film, Jean-Jacques Beineix's Diva. The film was not well received in the country of its origin, France, but became a box-office hit abroad. The money gained from the movie enabled Silberman to provide funding for Akira Kurosawa's ambitious 1985 film Ran, which at the time of its making was the most expensive Japanese film ever.

Silberman was awarded an honorary César Award in 1988.

== Death ==
He died in Paris in 2003 at the age of 86.

== Selected filmography ==
Year	Title	Director
1956	Bob le flambeur	Jean-Pierre Melville
1958	Le désert de Pigalle	Léo Joannon
1960	Le Trou	Jacques Becker
1961	The Nina B. Affair	Robert Siodmak
1962	Bird of Paradise	Marcel Camus
1963	Shéhérazade	Pierre Gaspard-Huit
1964	Gibraltar	Pierre Gaspard-Huit
1964	Diary of a Chambermaid	Luis Buñuel
1966	Galia	Georges Lautner
1966	Chartres sur table	Jesús Franco
1967	The Diabolical Dr. Z	Jesús Franco
1967	Le grand bidule	Raoul André
1968	Farewell, Friend	Jean Vautrin
1968	Love in the Night	Marcel Camus
1969	The Milky Way	Luis Buñuel
1970	Rider on the Rain	René Clément
1972	The Discreet Charm of the Bourgeoisie	Luis Buñuel
1972	And Hope to Die	René Clément
1974	The Phantom of Liberty	Luis Buñuel
1976	Les mal parties	Sébastien Japrisot
1976	La fille d'amerique	David Newman (screenwriter)
1977	That Obscure Object of Desire	Luis Buñuel
1978	Sophie et le Capitaine	Liliane de Kermadec
1981	Diva	Jean-Jacques Beineix
1983	Exposed	James Toback
1985	A.K.	Chris Marker
1985	Ran	Akira Kurosawa
1986	Max mon amour	Nagisa Oshima
1988	Hemingway (miniseries)	Bernhard Sinkel
1991	Anna Karamazoff	Rustam Khamdamov
1991	La thune	Phillippe Galland
1997	Les paradoxes de Buñuel	Jorge Amat
