= Jenny Clève =

French actress (1930–2023)

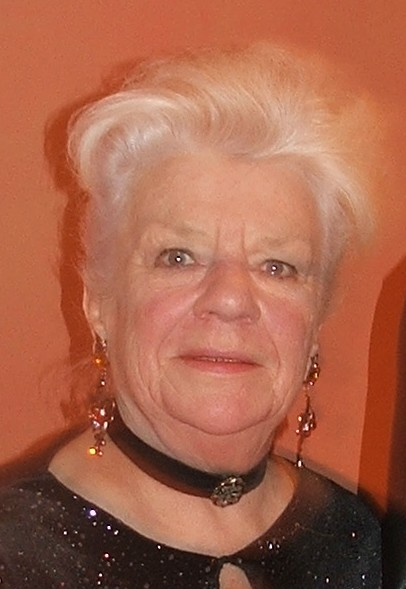
- Clève in 2008
- Born: 3 April 1930; Roubaix, France
- Died: 17 February 2023 (aged 92); Tourcoing, France
- Occupation: Actress

Jenny Clève (French pronunciation: [ʒɛni klɛv]; 3 April 1930 – 17 February 2023) was a French actress.

== Biography ==
Born in Roubaix on 3 April 1930, Clève was the daughter of André Clève and Marie Debode. She left her hometown during World War II and stayed with her father's cousins in Vernou-sur-Brenne. She returned to Roubaix in 1948 and was admitted to the Conservatoire de Roubaix, where she met Claude Talpaert, whom she married on 3 April 1951. The couple had four children: Nadine, Éric, Corinne, and Franck. Her granddaughter, Charlotte Talpaert, also became an actress. On 28 May 2019, she became the godmother of processional giant of Sailly-lez-Lannoy, Jean Gab'Lou.

Clève died in Tourcoing on 17 February 2023, at the age of 92.

== Filmography ==
- La Chair de l'orchidée (1975)
- Les Ambassadeurs (1975)
- F comme Fairbanks (1976)
- Docteur Françoise Gailland (1976)
- Calmos (1976)
- Monsieur Klein (1976)
- Shadow of the Castles (1977)
- The Night of Saint Germain des Pres (1977)
- Like a Turtle on Its Back (1978)
- Dossier 51 (1978)
- Mais ou et donc Ornicar (1979)
- Anthracite (1980)
- One Deadly Summer (1983)
- Winter 1960 (1983)
- La Garce (1984)
- Code Name: Emerald (1985)
- La Maison assassinée (1988)
- Les Enfants du naufrageur (1992)
- IP5: The Island of Pachyderms (1992)
- Germinal (1993)
- Élisa (1995)
- XY (1996)
- Lucie Aubrac (1997)
- XXL (1997)
- The Children of the Marshland (1999)
- A Crime in Paradise (2001)
- Welcome to the Sticks (2008)
- Arrêtez-moi (2013)
- Brèves de comptoir (2014)
