= A Crime in Paradise =

2001 film by Jean Becker

- French Poster
- Directed by: Jean Becker
- Written by: Sebastien Japrisot; Jean Becker based on La Poison by Sacha Guitry
- Produced by: Christian Fechner
- Starring: Jacques Villeret; Josiane Balasko; André Dussollier
- Cinematography: Jean-Marie Dreujou
- Edited by: Jacques Witta
- Music by: Pierre Bachelet
- Distributed by: UGC Fox Distribution
- Release dates: 9 February 2001 (Berlinale); 28 February 2001 (France)
- Running time: 89 minutes
- Country: France
- Language: French
- Budget: $11.9 million
- Box office: $13.9 million

A Crime in Paradise (French: Un crime au paradis) is a 2001 French comedy film directed by Jean Becker, adapted by Sebastien Japrisot from the story by Sacha Guitry, and starring Jacques Villeret and Josiane Balasko. The scenario was used on the film La Poison (1951).

== Plot ==
1980, in a rural village in the Lyon region, Saint-Julien-sur-Bibost. Joseph Poacher "Jojo" and his wife Lucienne "Lulu", a nagging shrew and inveterate alcoholic, lead a married life for the less confrontational, in their farm located in a place called "Paradise". One day, Jojo watches a story on television about a brilliant lawyer who has just achieved her twenty-fifth acquittal. Very impressed, Jojo seeks the lawyer out. He tells her he killed his wife even though he hasn't actually yet done so. Through a set of very clever questions, Jojo tricks the lawyer into explaining how he could kill his wife, and still be able to get the extenuating circumstances. Jojo then returns to "Paradise" and begins to organize, as directed by the lawyer, the staging of the "perfect crime".

== Cast ==
- Jacques Villeret as Jojo Braconnier
- Josiane Balasko as Lulu Braconnier
- André Dussollier as Lawyer Jacquard
- Suzanne Flon as Mistress
- Gérard Hernandez as Jacky
- Roland Magdane as The coffee's owner
- Valérie Mairesse as Magali
- Jacques Dacqmine as President Laborde
- Dominique Lavanant as Mlle Goudilleux
- Jean Dell as Judge Frégard
- Daniel Prévost as Lawyer Miramont
- Jenny Clève as Madame Bertrand
- Cécile Vassort as Madame Ramirez
- Eric Bougnon as Briscot
- Jean-Michel Martial as Jacky Lévêque
- Roger Crouzet as Mr. Doucet
- Christine Delaroche as Jacquard's assistant
- Maryse Deol as The dealer in notions
- Armand Chagot as Officer of police station
- Michel Bonnet as The substitute

== Production ==
Filming took place during the summer of 2000 in the Rhône in Saint-Julien-sur-Bibost, Savigny, Tarare, Lyon and in Isère in Grenoble.
