= One Deadly Summer (novel) =

1977 novel by Sébastien Japrisot

- First edition (French)
- Author: Sébastien Japrisot
- Original title: L'Été meurtrier
- Translator: Alan Sheridan
- Language: French
- Genre: Crime fiction
- Publisher: Harcourt Brace Jovanovich
- Publication date: 1977
- Publication place: France
- English publication date: 1980
- Media type: Print
- Awards: Prix des Deux Magots

One Deadly Summer is a psychological suspense novel by Sébastien Japrisot, originally published in French as L'Été meurtrier in 1977. It received the 1978 Prix des Deux Magots in France. Japrisot also scripted the 1983 film adaptation directed by Jean Becker and starring Isabelle Adjani.

== Plot ==
Eliane, or "Elle", a beautiful young woman settles into a mountain village with her Austrian mother (whom the local people mistake for a German and call 'Eva Braun') and disabled father Gabriel. Soon she becomes talk of the town because of her aloof but at the same time, sexually provocative behavior. She has an affair with Florimond Montecciari, nicknamed Ping-Pong, a car mechanic and volunteer fireman. Soon Eliane insinuates herself into the Montecciari household, and starts inquiring about Ping-Pong's late father, and the old piano that the family keeps in the barn. It turns out that Eliane is out to avenge the long-ago rape of her own mother by three men who had arrived at her isolated house in a van which contained an old piano which they were delivering. Eliane is the child of that rape, and doesn't know her real father.

Since the father of the Montecciaris is already dead, she decides to take revenge on the two suspects who are still alive: Leballech and his brother-in-law Touret. She poses as a young teacher and rents an apartment from Touret to be closer to her targets. At the same time she marries Ping-Pong. Soon after the wedding, she disappears and is later found in Marseille. She has regressed into childhood, and has to be institutionalized in a clinic. Seeing his wife's mental state, Ping-Pong believes that Eliane is the victim of Leballech and Touret who prostituted her, according to the rumors she spread before she had lost her mind. He tracks down and shoots both men before realizing his mistake. He discovers that Eliane was wrong: her adoptive father Gabriel had long ago shot the real culprits. Ping-Pong is arrested and recounts the whole story to his attorney.

== Style and structure ==
The novel opens with a quote from Lewis Carroll’s Alice in Wonderland: “I'll be judge, I'll be jury,' Said cunning old Fury: 'I'll try the whole cause, and condemn you to death."

Marina Kundu writes in her analysis of the novel: "The reader follows the process of detection of the criminal’s identity through the separate testimonies of four characters. All are involved in Elle’s plan of vengeance, all assume a wider reference than would be indicated by their individual designations as victim, witness, juror or judge." And yet none of them is able to prevent the fatal course of events: "Like the analogous extratextual readers, they are trapped by the narrative situation—by the detective novel's peculiarity of being narrated backwards, inversely from the moment of the revelation of the criminal."

The book is divided into six parts:

- "The Executioner" narrated by Ping-Pong;
- "The Victim" narrated by Eliane;
- "The Witness" narrated by Ping-Pong's Aunt Nine nicknamed Cognata;
- "The Indictment" narrated by Eliane's mother;
- "The Sentence" again narrated by Eliane who is now revealed to be 'judge and jury';
- "The Execution" narrated by Ping-Pong who is by this point emerges as the true victim.

The text is constructed in a circular fashion: Chapter One begins and ends with the same phrase: "I said OK," and Chapter Six ends at the point at which this phrase from Chapter One is uttered in 'real time.'

Japrisot occasionally uses present-tense narration, especially in Eliane's sections "giving a sense of narration simultaneous with the actions recounted, and thus avoiding the artificiality of a retrospective narrator concealing his hindsight."

== Reception ==
One Deadly Summer was the winner of the 1978 Prix des Deux Magots in France, and received positive reviews from critics.

Kirkus Reviews wrote: "Slow to build as its four narrators come and go, this psychological crime-suspense is nevertheless unreeled with the taut, confident shaping of a grand master; Japrisot… has finally found just the right balance between very Gallic atmospheric density and ironic, tragically twisting events." The reviewer then added: "In other hands, this sexual melodrama might have come across as both contrived and lurid; here, however, it's a rich and resonant sonata in black, astutely suspended between mythic tragedy and the grubby pathos of nagging everyday life." Jean Strouse wrote in Newsweek: "Fragments of her [Eliane's] disturbing story come slowly together like the pieces in a psychological jigsaw puzzle—rape, murder, incest, revenge, split personality. Japrisot slices into these small-town European lives with all the precision of a fine surgeon. He gets each voice just right, in Alan Sheridan's deft translation, and Elle's bizarre behavior gradually begins to make sense. By the end, you feel more sympathy than horror at the ghastly truth." Reviewing the paperback edition, The New York Times commented: "This chilling story of psychological suspense is the work of a French novelist who has been influenced by American crime writing, yet on its own terms it is a most original creation." David Bellos wrote: "Japrisot's novel engages with painful, paradoxical and profound dimensions of human life, and no one who reads it can fail to be moved, scared, fascinated, and to a degree, transformed by it."

== Publications in English ==
- New York: Harcourt Brace Jovanovich, 1980
- London: Secker and Warburg, 1980
- New York: Penguin Books, 1981
- New York: Plume, 1997
- London : Harvill, 2000
- Mineola, New York: Dover Publications, Inc., 2019

== Film adaptation ==
- 1983: One Deadly Summer, French film directed by Jean Becker and starring Isabelle Adjani as Eliane and Alain Souchon as Ping-Pong. The film was a commercial and critical success in France, and received four César awards, including one to Japrisot for Best Adapted Screenplay.
