= The Children of the Marshland =

- Theatrical release poster
- Directed by: Jean Becker
- Screenplay by: Sébastien Japrisot
- Based on: Les Enfants du marais by Georges Montforez
- Produced by: Christian Fechner
- Starring: Jacques Villeret; Jacques Gamblin; André Dussollier; Michel Serrault; Isabelle Carré; Suzanne Flon; Jacques Dufilho; Eric Cantona
- Cinematography: Jean-Marie Dreujou
- Edited by: Jacques Witta
- Music by: Pierre Bachelet
- Distributed by: UGC-Fox Distribution
- Release date: 3 March 1999
- Running time: 115 minutes
- Country: France
- Language: French
- Budget: €9.2 million
- Box office: $11.3 million

The Children of the Marshland (French: Les Enfants du marais) is a 1999 French film directed by Jean Becker.

== Plot ==
The film is set in a marsh, along the banks of Loire river, about ten years after the great war. Riton is afflicted with a bad-tempered wife and three unruly children. Garris lives alone with his recollections of World War I trenches. Their daily life consists of seasonal work and visits from their two pals: Tane, the local train conductor and Amédée, a dreamer and voracious reader of classics.

== Cast ==
- Jacques Villeret as Riton
- Jacques Gamblin as Garris
- André Dussollier as Amédée
- Michel Serrault as Pépé la Rainette
- Isabelle Carré as Marie
- Eric Cantona as Jo Sardi
- Jacques Boudet as Tane
- Suzanne Flon as Old Cri Cri
- Jacques Dufilho as Old man
- Gisèle Casadesus as Madame Mercier
- Roland Magdane as Felix
- Anne Le Guernec as Mireille

== Production ==
Filming took place entirely in Rhône-Alpes:

- Ain (Colomieu, Montmerle-sur-Saône, Trévoux, Cerdon, Fareins)
- Rhône (Lyon, Morancé, Villefranche-sur-Saône, Cogny)
- Ardèche (Lamastre)
Lac d'Arboréiaz

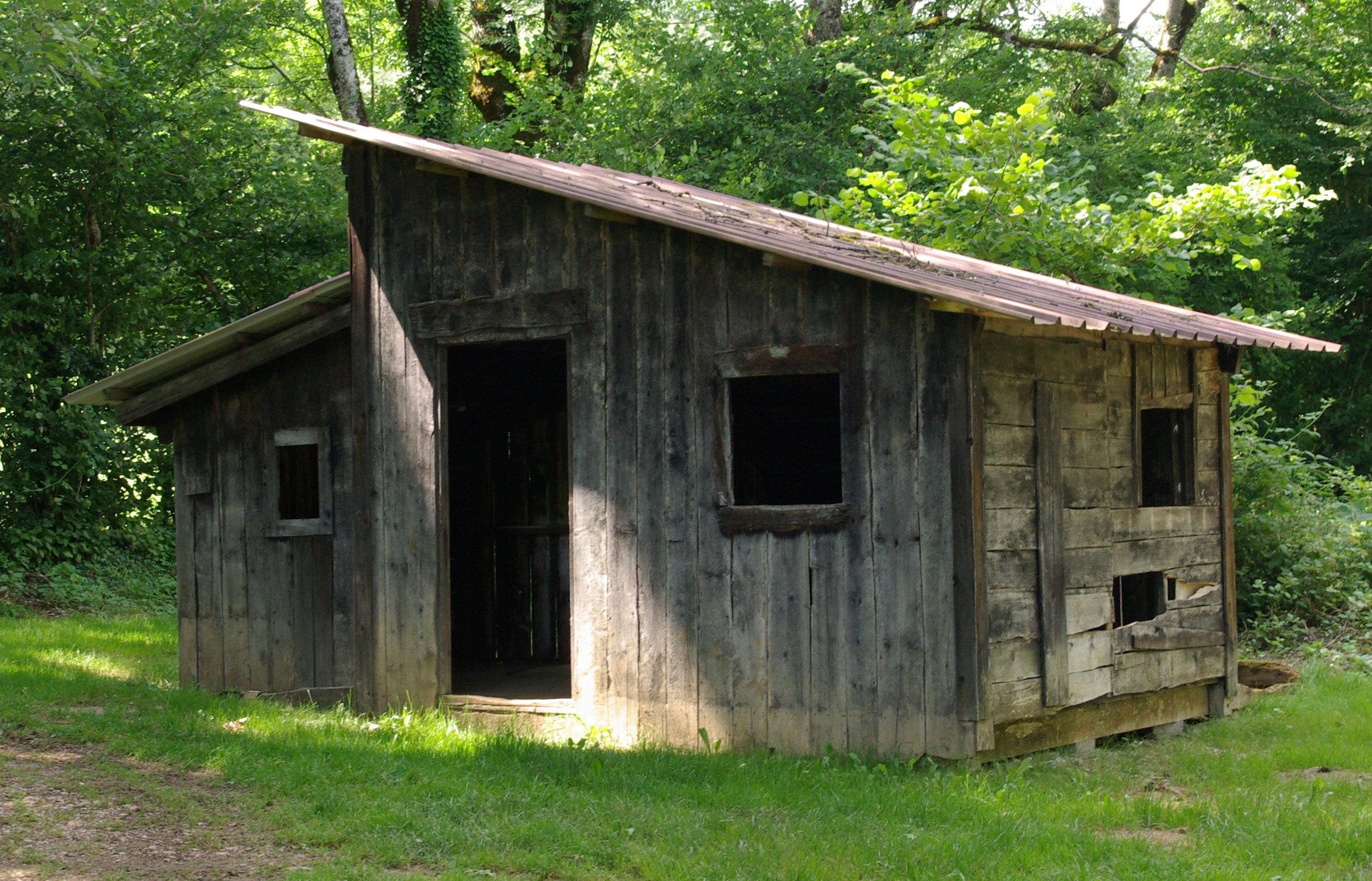
Riton's shack

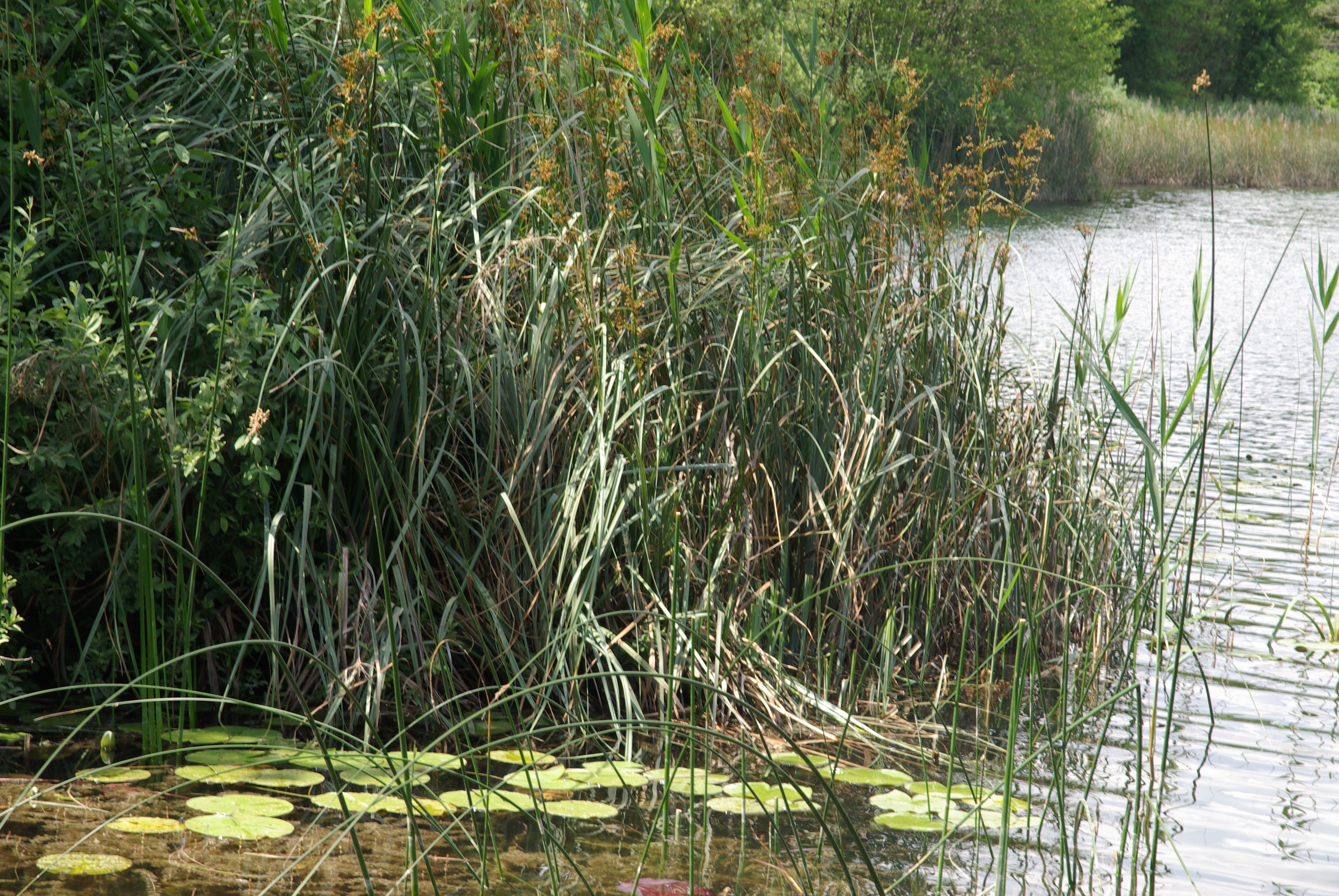
Pond near Riton's shack

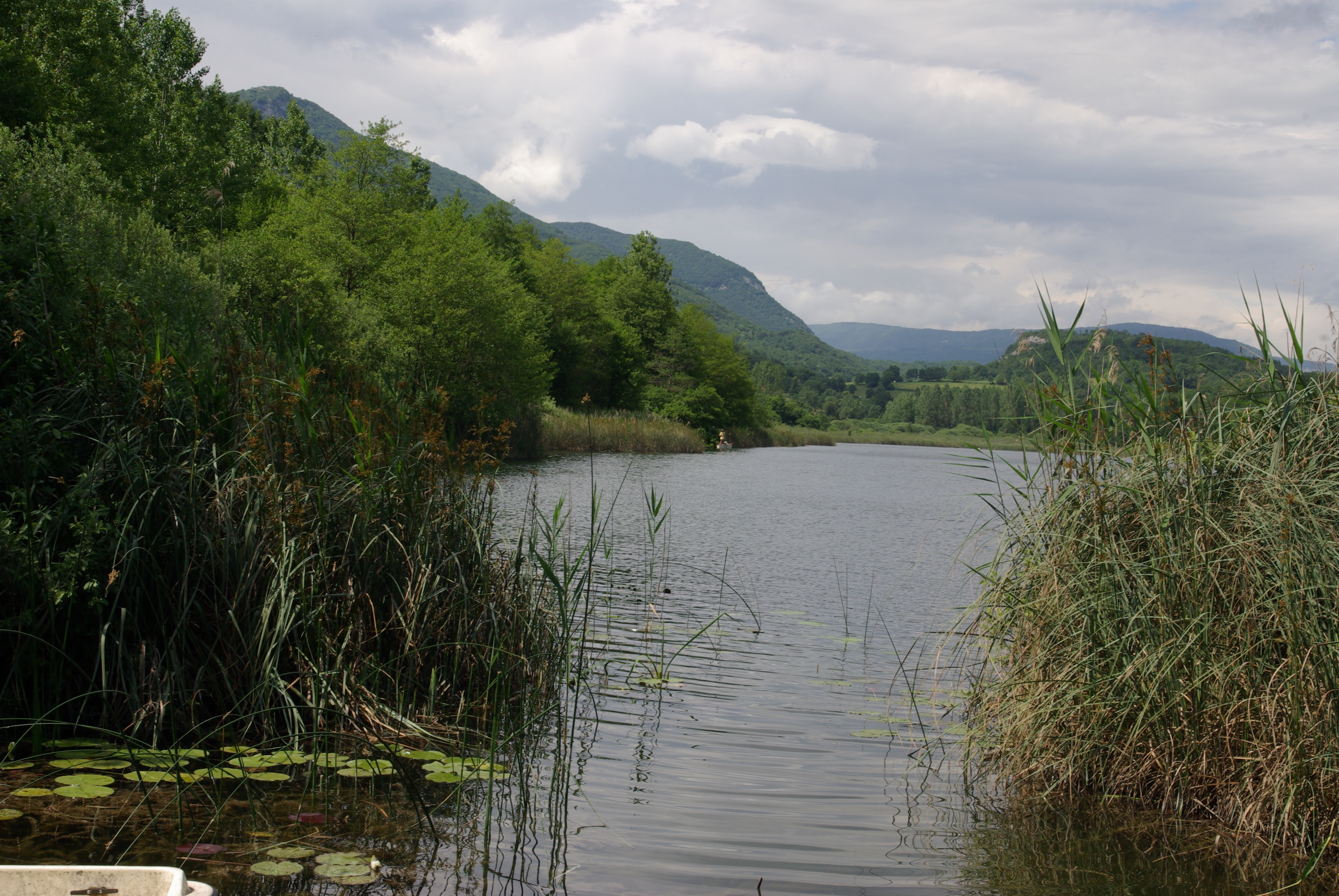
General view of the pond

== Box office ==
The film was one of the highest grossing French films for the year, with a gross of $11.3 million.
