= Élisa (1995 film) =

- Theatrical release poster
- Directed by: Jean Becker
- Written by: Jean Becker; Fabrice Carazo
- Produced by: Henri Brichetti; Christian Fechner
- Starring: Vanessa Paradis; Gérard Depardieu
- Cinematography: Étienne Becker
- Edited by: Jacques Witta
- Music by: Michel Colombier; Serge Gainsbourg; Zbigniew Preisner
- Production company: Gaumont
- Distributed by: Gaumont Buena Vista International
- Release date: 1 February 1995
- Running time: 115 minutes
- Country: France
- Language: French
- Budget: $11.1 million
- Box office: $18.5 million

Élisa is a 1995 dramatic French film directed by Jean Becker and starring Vanessa Paradis, Gérard Depardieu, Clotilde Courau, Firmine Richard and Florence Thomassin. It was released by Gaumont through Gaumont Buena Vista International in France on 1 February 1995.

== Plot ==
Marie is a teenage girl living a life of crime with her friends on the streets of Paris. Her mother, Élisa, suffering from poverty and abandoned by her husband and estranged from her parents, had tried to kill her when she was very young and later committed suicide. Her father has never been a part of her life. One day, Marie decides to find him and take revenge for not helping her as a child. However, when she finds him, she realizes she cannot kill him. A flashback reveals that he had left her mother because she had prostituted herself to support the family. After discovering a love letter her father had written to her mother, Marie forgives him.

== Cast ==
- Vanessa Paradis as Marie Desmoulin
- Gérard Depardieu as Jacques 'Lébovitch' Desmoulin
- Clotilde Courau as Solange
- Sekkou Sall as Ahmed
- Florence Thomassin as Élisa Desmoulin
- Michel Bouquet as Samuel
- Philippe Léotard as Gitane Smoker
- Catherine Rouvel as Manina
- Melvil Poupaud as Pharmacist's son
- Olivier Saladin as Kevin
- Bernard Verley as The contractor
- José Garcia as Taxi Passenger
- Philippe Duquesne as P.M.U. Owner
- Firmine Richard as P.M.U. Customer
- Samir Guesmi

== Themes ==
The film features the song Elisa by Serge Gainsbourg, to whom the film is posthumously dedicated. The song tells about the love of a man in his forties for a girl in her twenties, alluding to Marie and her father Jacques.
