= One Deadly Summer =

1983 film by Jean Becker

- Theatrical release poster
- French: L'Été meurtrier
- Directed by: Jean Becker
- Screenplay by: Sébastien Japrisot
- Based on: One Deadly Summer by Sébastien Japrisot
- Produced by: Christine Beyout
- Starring: Isabelle Adjani; Alain Souchon; Suzanne Flon; Maria Machado; Jenny Clève; Evelyne Didi; Jean Gaven; François Cluzet; Manuel Gélin; Roger Carel; Michel Galabru
- Cinematography: Étienne Becker
- Edited by: Jacques Witta
- Music by: Georges Delerue
- Production companies: Société Nouvelle de Cinématographie; CAPAC; TF1 Films Production
- Distributed by: Société Nouvelle de Cinématographie
- Release dates: 10 May 1983 (Cannes); 11 May 1983 (France)
- Running time: 130 minutes
- Country: France
- Language: French

One Deadly Summer (French: L'Été meurtrier) is a 1983 French drama film directed by Jean Becker from a screenplay by Sébastien Japrisot, based on Japrisot's 1977 novel of the same name. Isabelle Adjani won a César Award for Best Actress for her performance in this film. The film was successful in France, gaining 5,137,040 admissions and becoming the second highest-grossing film of the year.

== Plot ==
Eliane ("Elle") (Isabelle Adjani), a reserved yet striking young woman, moves to a small town in southern France with her withdrawn mother (Maria Machado) and her physically disabled father. Her mysterious demeanor and overt sensuality quickly attract attention and speculation among the local residents.

Unbeknownst to those around her, Elle is consumed by a desire to avenge the rape of her mother, which occurred years earlier at the hands of three men who had arrived at their remote home under the pretense of delivering a piano. The trauma left a lasting imprint on both mother and daughter.

Elle becomes involved with a shy local car mechanic (Alain Souchon), whose gentleness contrasts with her internal turmoil. However, her perception of him changes drastically when she learns that his deceased father, an Italian immigrant, had once owned the same piano involved in the assault. Believing this connection implicates his family, Elle misdirects her anger toward them.

As she delves deeper into her quest for vengeance, Elle’s mental state deteriorates. Eventually, she discovers that her suspicions were unfounded: the men she believed responsible were innocent, and her father had already avenged the crime years earlier. This revelation proves overwhelming, leading to her institutionalization.

Unaware of the full truth, the mechanic misinterprets the situation. Believing the accused men to be guilty and responsible for Elle's breakdown, he seeks them out and kills them, culminating in a tragic and misguided act of retribution.

== Cast ==
- Isabelle Adjani as Eliane Wieck, known as "Elle"; she is known by her German mother's maiden name rather than by the surname of her father (Gabriel Devigne), because she was born as the result of her mother being gang raped. However, Gabriel subsequently comes to accept Eliane and brings her up as his child.
- Alain Souchon as Fiorimonto "Florimond" Montecciari, known as "Pin-Pon"; he is a volunteer firefighter and "pin pon" is an onomatopoeiac version of a firetruck siren.
- Suzanne Flon as Nine, known as "Cognata"
- Jenny Clève as Madame Montecciari, the mother of "Pin Pon"
- Maria Machado as Paula Wieck Devigne, the mother of Elle
- Evelyne Didi as Calamité
- Jean Gaven as Leballech, the boss of the sawmill
- François Cluzet as Mickey
- Manuel Gélin as Boubou
- Roger Carel as Henri, known as "Henri IV"
- Michel Galabru as Gabriel Devigne, the father of Elle
- Martin Lamotte as Georges Massigne
- Marie-Pierre Casey as Mademoiselle Tussaud, the home nurse
- Cécile Vassort as Josette
- Édith Scob as La doctoresse
- Maïwenn Le Besco as 'Elle' as a child

== Production ==
The film was shot in the villages around Gordes: Saint Saturnin d'Apt, Murs, and Villars.

== Soundtrack ==
The original music was written by Georges Delerue. Yves Montand sings his "Trois petites notes de musique", a song that was originally performed by Cora Vaucaire in The Long Absence.

== Reception ==
The film was successful in France, gaining 5,137,040 admissions and becoming the second highest-grossing film of the year. It received four César Awards.

The film received mixed reviews from English-speaking critics. Variety said that "often questionable in matters of credibility and wobbly in its dramatic conception, pic is nonetheless fairly engrossing, thanks to Isabelle Adjani, astonishing in the central role." The New York Times chief film critic Vincent Canby remarked that Adjani "looks smashing in a series of flimsy little dresses" but "the plot... is less complicated than devious." Time Out said the film was "directed with verve", and though it "rarely departs from the commercial mainstream, but within those conventions it operates with assurance, subtlety and plenty of surprises."

== Awards ==
=== César Awards, France, 1984 ===
Winner

- César Best Actress – Isabelle Adjani
- Best Editing – Jacques Witta
- Best Supporting Actress – Suzanne Flon
- Best Adaptation – Sébastien Japrisot

Nominated

- César Best Actor – Alain Souchon
- Best Director – Jean Becker
- Best Film – Jean Becker
- Best Music Written for a Film – Georges Delerue
- Best Supporting Actor – François Cluzet
