= Adieu l'ami =

1968 film directed by Jean Herman

- Theatrical release poster
- Directed by: Jean Herman
- Written by: Sébastien Japrisot
- Produced by: Serge Silberman
- Starring: Alain Delon; Charles Bronson; Olga Georges-Picot; Bernard Fresson; Brigitte Fossey
- Cinematography: Jean-Jacques Tarbės
- Edited by: Hélène Plemiannikov
- Music by: François de Roubaix
- Production companies: Greenwich Film Productions; Medusa Distribuzione
- Distributed by: Fox-Lira (France); Medusa Distribuzione (Italy)
- Release date: 1968 (France)
- Running time: 115 minutes
- Countries: France; Italy
- Language: French
- Box office: $19.8 million (est. $6 million)

Adieu l'ami (also known as Farewell, Friend, reissued as Honor Among Thieves) is a 1968 French-Italian heist crime film directed by Jean Herman and produced by Serge Silberman, with a screenplay by Sebastien Japrisot. The film was a great success in Europe and made Charles Bronson a star there after a career as a supporting actor in Hollywood.

== Plot ==
Demobilised after the war in Algeria, legionnaire Franz Propp tries to get army doctor Dino Barran to go to the Congo with him. But Barran feels he has to help the beautiful Isabelle Moreau, whose lover he accidentally killed in Algeria. She wants him to take a job in a big firm in Paris, where his assistant will be an attractive girl called Dominique Austerlitz, and over the Christmas break to secretly return some missing documents to the safe.

Propp, who has found work as a pimp, follows Barran into the building and overhears that there are also millions in wages in the safe. He wants the money, while Barran merely wants to fulfil his promise to Isabelle. After much arguing and fighting the two unwillingly co-operate and get the safe open, to find the money has been taken. They also find they are locked in the strong room with no light, air, food or drink. Escaping eventually through a shaft, they find a security guard shot dead. Successfully getting out of the building, they try to catch a flight at the airport but Propp is caught by the police. Despite intensive interrogation, he does not talk.

Meanwhile, Barran, who has persuaded Dominique to shelter him, offers to talk to the police. They follow him to the scene of the crime, where Dominique is to look for evidence of his innocence, when Isabelle appears with a gun. In a fracas she shoots a policeman, whereupon both girls are killed by a police machine gun. It was the two of them who had taken the money, killed the guard, and tricked Barran into being their fall guy.

== Cast ==
- Alain Delon as Dino Barran
- Charles Bronson as Franz Propp (voiced by John Berry)
- Olga Georges-Picot as Isabelle Moreau
- Brigitte Fossey as Dominique 'Waterloo' Austerlitz
- Bernard Fresson as Insp. Antoine Méloutis
- Marianna Falk as Catherine
- Ellen Bahl as Martha
- Jean-Claude Ballard as the Police Inspector

== Production ==
Alain Delon was looking for an American actor to play his co-star in the film. He admired Bronson's acting, particularly in movies like Machine Gun Kelly and had the producer approach him when Bronson was in Europe making Villa Rides. Bronson's agent Paul Kohner later recalled:

Silberman pitched Bronson on the fact that in the American film industry all the money, all the publicity, goes to the pretty boy hero types. In Europe, he told him, the public is attracted by character, not face. Bronson had always resisted doing European films before ... This time he was only half convinced by Silberman's arguments, but I made the deal for him to do Adieu l'ami.

Bronson was signed in December 1967. The film was shot in Marseille and Paris.

== Release ==
=== Theatrical ===
Paramount had distribution rights to the film in the US but it was not released there until 1973. The Los Angeles Times called it "overly contrived, overlong, uninspired – and unrelentingly tedious." TV Guide wrote: "There's good chemistry between Delon and Bronson" and added that there are "some problems with the plot but otherwise intriguing."

=== Home media ===
In the 1980s, Monterey Home Video released the film as Honor Among Thieves. Lionsgate, via license from StudioCanal, re-released it on DVD in 2008. Wild East released it under the original English-language title Farewell, Friend on a limited edition region-free NTSC DVD alongside Rider on the Rain, also starring Charles Bronson, in 2011.

== Reception ==
=== Box office ===
The film was a massive hit in France, earning around $6 million at the box office. Bronson went on to star in a series of European made movies that were hugely popular, including Once Upon a Time in the West and Rider on the Rain.
