= Helen Weaver =

American writer and translator (1931–2021)

Helen Weaver (June 18, 1931 – April 13, 2021) was an American writer and translator. She translated over fifty books from French. Antonin Artaud: Selected Writings was a Finalist for the National Book Award in translation in 1977.

Weaver was the general editor, a contributor and a translator for the Larousse Encyclopedia of Astrology (1980). In 2001 she published The Daisy Sutra, a book on animal communication. In 2009 Weaver published The Awakener: A Memoir of Kerouac and the Fifties. Jack Kerouac (1922–1969) was a prominent writer and poet of the Beat Generation. In her review in The New York Times, Tara McKelvey wrote "Kerouac’s soul lives on through many people — Joyce Johnson, for one — but few have been as adept as Weaver at capturing both him and the New York bohemia of the time. He was lucky to have met her."

== Biography ==
Helen Weaver grew up in Scarsdale, New York. Her father, Warren Weaver, was a scientist, author, and world traveler who was Director of Natural Sciences at the Rockefeller Foundation for twenty-seven years. Her mother, Mary Hemenway Weaver, taught Latin and ancient history. Weaver graduated magna cum laude from Oberlin College with a B.A. in English Literature in 1952. She married Oberlin classmate James Pierce in 1952; they divorced in 1955. Her brother, Warren Weaver, Jr., was a political reporter on the Washington bureau of The New York Times.

In 1956 she met the writer Jack Kerouac, and they fell in love. Although the relationship did not last, it was immortalised in books written by both of them. Weaver often received drunken phone calls from Kerouac after they had parted. She would always tell him to phone back in the morning, but he never did. However, she made notes of what was said in every call, and collected clippings about him. Eventually she compiled everything into the book The Awakener: A Memoir of Kerouac and the Fifties.

== Death ==
Weaver died on April 13, 2021, at her home in Woodstock, New York. She was 89.

== Selected translations ==
- Merle, Robert (1969). The Day of the Dolphin. Helen Weaver, translator. Simon and Schuster. ISBN 9780671201821. OCLC 7720. Translation of Merle, Robert (1967). Un animal doué de raison [A Sentient Animal] (in French). Gallimard. OCLC 1870967. The novel was the basis for the film The Day of the Dolphin (1973).
- Steiner, Jean-François (1967). Treblinka. Helen Weaver, translator; Simone de Beauvoir, preface. Simon & Schuster. OCLC 394953. This novel about the 1943 uprising at the Treblinka concentration camp during World War II was a bestseller in France; see also Jean-François Steiner.
- Japrisot, Sébastien (1965) Trap for Cinderella, Simon & Schuster
- Japrisot, Sébastien (1967) The Lady in the Car with Glasses and a Gun, Simon & Schuster
- Wittig, Monique (1976). The Opoponax. Helen Weaver, translator. Daughters. ISBN 9780913780152. OCLC 2743497. Translation of Wittig, Monique (1964). L'Opoponax (in French). Editions de Minuit.
