= Suzanne Flon =

French actress (1918–2005)

- Born: 28 January 1918; Le Kremlin-Bicêtre, France
- Died: 15 June 2005 (aged 87); Paris, France
- Resting place: Père Lachaise Cemetery
- Other name: Sizan Flon
- Occupation: Actor
- Years active: 1941–2005

Suzanne Flon (28 January 1918 – 15 June 2005) was a French stage, film, and television actress. She won the Volpi Cup for Best Actress for her performance in the 1961 film Thou Shalt Not Kill. Flon also received two César Awards and two Molière Awards in her career.

== Early life ==
Her father was a railway worker and her mother crafted jewellery. Prior to becoming an actress, Flon worked as an English translator at the Paris department store Au Printemps and then as personal secretary to Édith Piaf. The great love of her life was the legendary film director John Huston. She never married.

== Theatre roles ==
Flon's stage credits included plays by Jean Anouilh (L'Alouette, Antigone, Roméo et Jeannette), André Roussin (La Petite Hutte), and Loleh Bellon (La Chambre d'amis, Les Dames du jeudi, Changement à vue, and Une Absence). Her English-language theatrical roles included Katherine (The Taming of the Shrew) and Rosalind (As You Like It).

== Filmography ==
Year	Title	Role	Director	Notes
1941	Ce n'est pas moi	Petit rôle	Jacques de Baroncelli	Uncredited
1943	Colonel Chabert	Albertine	René Le Hénaff	Uncredited
1947	Captain Blomet		Andrée Feix	
1949	Suzanne and the Robbers	Suzanne Seguin	Yves Ciampi	
1949	Last Love	Simone	Jean Stelli	
1949	Cage of Girls	Madame Edith	Maurice Cloche	
1950	Bed for Two; Rendezvous with Luck	Blanche Pidoux-Bobin	Emil-Edwin Reinert	
1951	The Beautiful Image	Lucienne Chenal	Claude Heymann	
1952	Trial at the Vatican	Mother Agnès de Jésus	André Haguet	
1952	Moulin Rouge	Myriamme Hayam	John Huston	
1954	Your Favorite Story		Leslie Goodwins & Jacques Nahum	TV series (1 Episode)
1955	Mr. Arkadin	Baroness Nagel	Orson Welles	
1958	Prisons de femmes		Maurice Cloche (2)	
1960	Un beau dimanche de septembre	Adriana	Marcel Cravenne	TV movie
1961	Tu ne tueras point	Kordijeova's mother	Claude Autant-Lara	Volpi Cup for Best Actress
1961	Madame se meurt	Narrator	Jean Cayrol & Claude Durand	Short
1961	Famous Love Affairs	Margravine Ursula	Michel Boisrond	(segment "Agnès Bernauer")
1962	Le mal court	Alcarica	Alain Boudet	TV movie
1962	A Monkey in Winter	Suzanne Quentin	Henri Verneuil	
1962	The Trial	Miss Pittl	Orson Welles (2)	
1963	The Bread Peddler	Jeanne Fortier	Maurice Cloche (3)	
1963	Nutty, Naughty Chateau	Agathe	Roger Vadim	
1964	The Train	Mademoiselle Villard	John Frankenheimer	
1967	If I Were a Spy	Geneviève Laurent	Bertrand Blier	
1967	Le soleil des voyous	Marie-Jeanne Farrand	Jean Delannoy	
1968	Tante Zita	Yvette	Robert Enrico	
1968	Le franciscain de Bourges	Madame Toledano	Claude Autant-Lara (2)	
1969	Délire à deux	Vous	Michel Mitrani	TV movie
1969	Under the Sign of the Bull	Christine Raynal	Gilles Grangier	
1969	Jeff	Mrs. de Groote	Jean Herman	
1969	La chasse royale	Céline	François Leterrier	
1970	Teresa	Teresa	Gérard Vergez	Taormina Film Fest - Best Acting Performance
1971	Aussi loin que l'amour	The Captain	Frédéric Rossif	
1973	Les volets clos	Rosalie	Jean-Claude Brialy	
1973	Escape to Nowhere	Jeanne	Claude Pinoteau	
1973	Au théâtre ce soir	Hélène	Georges Folgoas	TV series (1 Episode)
1974	Le tour d'écrou	Elizabeth Gridders	Raymond Rouleau	TV movie
1974	Les enquêtes du commissaire Maigret	Aline Callas	Marcel Cravenne (2)	TV series (1 Episode)
1974	Un amour de pluie	Madame Edith	Jean-Claude Brialy (2)	
1974	Nouvelles de Henry James	Elizabeth	Raymond Rouleau (2)	TV series (1 Episode)
1975	Le voyage en province	Alain's mother	Jacques Tréfouel	TV movie
1975	Le renard dans l'île	Aunt Martine	Leïla Senati	TV movie
1976	Docteur Françoise Gailland	Geneviève Liénard	Jean-Louis Bertucelli	
1976	Monsieur Albert	Man-Louise	Jacques Renard	
1976	Monsieur Klein	The concierge	Joseph Losey	
1976	Boomerang	Madame Grimaldi	José Giovanni	
1976	Hôtel Baltimore	Millie	Arcady	TV movie
1977	La vérité de Madame Langlois	Thérèse	Claude Santelli	TV movie
1977	Black-Out	Barmaid	Philippe Mordacq	
1979	Les héritiers	Jeanne	Jean-Pierre Gallo	TV series (1 Episode)
1980	Le noeud de vipères	Isa	Jacques Trébouta	TV movie
1980	Une voix		Dominique Crèvecoeur	Short
1980	Le curé de Tours	Mademoiselle Gamard	Gabriel Axel	TV movie
1981	Quartet	Madame Hautchamp	James Ivory	
1981	Mon meilleur Noël	The grand mother	Gabriel Axel (2)	TV series (1 Episode)
1983	One Deadly Summer	Nine Cognata	Jean Becker	César Award for Best Supporting Actress
1984	Le dialogue des Carmélites	Madame de Croissy	Pierre Cardinal	TV movie
1984	Le coeur sur la main	Marcelle	Hervé Baslé	TV movie
1984	Mademoiselle Clarisse	Mademoiselle Clarisse	Ange Casta	TV movie 7 d'Or for Best Actress
1984	Le dernier civil	Mademoiselle Fabricius	Laurent Heynemann	TV movie
1985	La robe mauve de Valentine	Marie	Patrick Bureau	TV movie
1986	Cinéma 16	Georgette	Franck Apprederis	TV series (1 Episode)
1986	Triple sec		Yves Thomas	Short
1987	Série noire	Renée	Marcel Bluwal	TV series (1 Episode)
1987	Dagboek van een Oude Dwaas	Denise Hamelinck	Lili Rademakers	
1987	Gigi	Madame Alvarez	Jeannette Hubert	TV movie
1987	Chacun sa vérité	Madame Frola	Jean-Daniel Verhaeghe	TV movie
1987	Noyade interdite	Hazelle	Pierre Granier-Deferre	
1988	En toute innocence	Clemence	Alain Jessua	
1989	La vouivre	Louise Muselier	Georges Wilson	César Award for Best Supporting Actress
1990	Gaspard et Robinson	Mamie	Tony Gatlif	
1992	Voyage à Rome	The mother	Michel Lengliney	
1999	The Children of the Marshland	Old Cri Cri	Jean Becker (2)	
1999	Je suis né d'une cigogne	The neighbor	Tony Gatlif (2)	
2001	A Crime in Paradise	The mistress	Jean Becker (3)	
2002	Le miroir d'Alice	Maura Le Bellec	Marc Rivière	TV movie
2002	Mille millièmes	Madame Chartreux	Rémi Waterhouse	
2003	The Flower of Evil	Aunt Line	Claude Chabrol	
2003	Effroyables jardins	Marie Gerbier	Jean Becker (4)	
2004	The Bridesmaid	Madame Crespin	Claude Chabrol (2)	
2005	Joyeux Noël	Chatelaine	Christian Carion	
2006	Avenue Montaigne	Madame Roux	Danièle Thompson	(final film role)

== Awards and nominations ==
=== César Awards ===
Year	Category	Film	Result
1984	Best Supporting Actress	L'Été meurtrier	Won
1990	Best Supporting Actress	La Vouivre	Won

=== Molière Awards ===
Year	Category	Play	Result
1987	Best Actress	Léopold le bien-aimé	Won
1989	Best Actress	Une absence	Nominated
1992	Best Actress	L'Antichambre	Nominated
1995	Best Actress	La Chambre d'amis	Won
2000	Best Actress	L'Amante anglaise	Nominated

=== Venice Film Festival ===
Year	Category	Film	Result
1961	Volpi Cup for Best Actress	Tu ne tueras point	Won

== Tributes ==
Director Danièle Thompson dedicated Avenue Montaigne to Flon, who had here her last film appearance. Writer-director John Huston described Flon as "the most extraordinary woman I have ever known."
