= Jean Gaven =

French actor

- Born: 16 January 1922; Saint-Rome-de-Cernon, France
- Died: 5 May 2014 (aged 92); Paris, France
- Occupation: Actor
- Years active: 1945-1998
- Spouse: Dominique Wilms

Jean Gaven (16 January 1922 – 5 May 2014) was a French actor. He appeared in more than sixty films between 1945 and 1996.

== Life and career ==
Born in Saint-Rome-de-Cernon, France on January 16, 1922, Gaven began acting sometime after the end of World War II, amassing a filmography of more than 60 motion pictures during a career spanning more than five decades. Married to the actress Dominique Wilms, he died at the age of 92 in Paris, France, on May 5, 2014.

== Filmography ==
Film
Year	Title	Role	Notes
1945	Les cadets de l'océan	Albertini, dit Tino	
1946	Son of France	Le lieutenant Brévannes	
1946	The Murderer is Not Guilty	Le jeune inspecteur Gustave Perkinson	
1946	Dropped from Heaven	Robert	
1947	Six Hours to Lose	Antoine	
1947	Something to Sing About	Jack Bing	
1948	Night Express	Un des deux complices	
1949	La bataille du feu	Jacques Legrand	
1949	At the Grand Balcony	Belfort	
1951	Tomorrow We Get Divorced	Johnny Buck	
1951	La peau d'un homme	Moussac	
1951	They Were Five	Marcel - le boxeur	
1951	Duel in Dakar	Fred	
1952	Les quatre sergents du Fort Carré	Finot	
1952	The Crime of Bouif	Michel	
1952	Feather in the Wind	François Bontemps	
1953	The Baker of Valorgue	Le curé	
1954	The Big Flag	Le lieutenant Lachenal	
1954	Obsessio	Alexandre Buisson	
1955	The Babes Make the Law	Frédéric Langlet - le mari de Christine	
1955	Madonna of the Sleeping Cars	Don Armando Félix	
1955	Sophie and the Crime	Ernest Sapinaud	
1955	Scandal in Montmartre	Félix Michaux	
1956	If All the Guys in the World	Jos - le second	
1956	La Loi des rues	André Remoulin dit Dédé la Glace	
1957	The River of Three Junks	Capitaine Brichet	
1957	The Crucible	Peter Corey	
1957	Young Girls Beware	Petit Jo	
1958	Les aventuriers du Mékong	Le Scaph	
1959	Du rififi chez les femmes	James	
1959	Visa pour l'enfer	Carlos	
1960	Amour, autocar et boîtes de nuit	Paul	
1961	Leon Garros ishchet druga	Grégoire	
1962	Le bateau d'Émile		
1964	Henri-Georges Clouzot's Inferno	Paul	
1965	Trap for Cinderella	Gabriel	
1966	Our Men in Bagdad	General Yuri Fiodorenko	
1968	Pasha	Marc	
1970	Rider on the Rain	Toussaint	
1971	Un aller simple	Dietrich	
1971	Où est passé Tom?	Anton Caras	
1972	And Hope to Die	Rizzio	
1975	Histoire d'O	Pierre	
1976	Les mal partis	Gargantua	
1976	Le trouble-fesses	Un tueur sicilien	
1977	The French Woman	Gustave Lucas	
1978	Who Is Killing the Great Chefs of Europe?	Salpetre	
1979	Un jour un tueur	Hugo Klein	
1981	Signé Furax	L'agent sans panier à salade	
1983	One Deadly Summer	Leballech, the boss of the sawmill	
1984	Vénus	Waldo	
1988	Juillet en septembre	Monsieur Challe	
1993	L'oeil écarlate	Etienne Delvaux	
1996	Les Bidochon	Maître Nerval	(final film role)
