= Rider on the Rain =

1970 french film

- French theatrical release poster
- French: Le passager de la pluie
- Directed by: René Clément
- Screenplay by: Sébastien Japrisot
- Produced by: Serge Silberman
- Starring: Charles Bronson; Marlène Jobert; Gabriele Tinti; Jean Gaven; Jean Piat; Jill Ireland; Corinne Marchand; Annie Cordy
- Cinematography: Andréas Winding
- Edited by: Françoise Javet
- Music by: Francis Lai
- Production companies: Greenwich Film Productions; Medusa Distribuzione
- Distributed by: Compagnie Française de Distribution Cinématographique (France); Medusa Distribuzione (Italy)
- Release date: 21 January 1970 (France)
- Running time: 120 minutes
- Countries: France; Italy
- Languages: French; English (Note: Shot in separate French and English-language versions.)
- Box office: $30,964,823; 4,763,822 admissions (France)

Rider on the Rain (French: Le passager de la pluie) is a 1970 mystery thriller film directed by René Clément, from a screenplay by Sébastien Japrisot, and starring Marlène Jobert and Charles Bronson. Jobert plays a young woman who kills her rapist, only to be pursued by a mysterious American man (Bronson).

The French-Italian co-production was released on 21 January 1970, and was both a critical and commercial success. It won Best Foreign Language Film at the 28th Golden Globe Awards.

== Plot ==
Opening with a quotation from Lewis Carroll to suggest that the heroine is like Alice in Wonderland, the film starts on a rainy autumn afternoon in a small resort on the south coast of France.

On the Giens Peninsula, Mellie, newly married to Toni, an airline navigator who is away at work, sees a strange man get off a bus. In a shop trying on a dress to wear to a wedding next day, she sees the man spying on her. When she goes home, he sneaks into the house, ties her up and rapes her. Realizing after she has freed herself that he is still in the house, she gets out a shotgun and kills him. Then she drives the body to a cliff and tips it into the sea, saying nothing to her jealous husband when he returns.

Next day at the wedding an uninvited American called Dobbs speaks to her. A body has been found and he claims she killed him, which she denies. The day after that, when her husband is away again, Dobbs sneaks into their house and questions Mellie roughly. She begins to think that the rapist had business with Toni, possibly drug related, and that is why Dobbs is so persistent. She goes with him to the bank and, drawing out all she has, offers it to him. But he doesn't want money, just the truth.

The next morning, Mellie stumbles upon the rapist's travel bag, which contains a staggering sum of 60,000 US dollars. Curious and determined, she stealthily enters Dobbs' hotel room to search for clues. To her astonishment, she uncovers evidence that Dobbs is not an ordinary individual but a US Army colonel involved in a covert mission.

In a dramatic turn of events, Dobbs unexpectedly appears and reveals that a woman employed at a Parisian restaurant has been apprehended for the murder. Overwhelmed by the injustice of an innocent woman facing charges, Mellie impulsively boards a plane to Paris, determined to uncover the truth. She heads to the restaurant, but instead, she is redirected to the workplace of the arrested woman's sister—an unexpected location: a brothel.

Within the confines of the brothel, Mellie finds herself subjected to intense interrogation by three criminals who are desperate for information about the deceased man. Just as the situation reaches a dangerous peak, Dobbs, who has been covertly following Mellie's trail, forcefully intervenes and rescues her from harm's way.

Taking her home, Dobbs reveals that the corpse is not that of the rapist but another man's. The rapist was an escapee from a US military prison who had attacked three women in similar fashion before Mellie. She then tells him where she tipped the body, which is found by police frogmen. For Dobbs, the case is closed. He does not tell the police about Mellie or mention the 60,000 dollars.

== Cast ==
- Charles Bronson as Colonel Harry Dobbs
- Marlène Jobert as Mélancolie "Mellie" Mau
- Gabriele Tinti as Tony Mau
- Annie Cordy as Juliette
- Corinne Marchand as Tania
- Jill Ireland as Nicole
- Jean Piat as Armand
- Marcel Pérès as Station Master
- Ellen Bahl as Madeline Legauff
- Jean Gaven as Inspector Toussaint
- Marc Mazza as The Passenger (Mac Guffin)
- Corinne Marchand as Tania
- Marika Green as Hostess at Tania's
- Steve Eckhardt as American Officer

== Production ==
=== Development ===
The film was shot in both English and French versions. In an interview with Variety, Bronson said he learned his lines in French phonetically, so that his own voice would be heard on the soundtrack. It was the last time he did this for European films, allowing himself to be dubbed-over in all subsequent films.

=== Filming ===
Filming began June 2, 1969 on the Giens Peninsula and finished August 4, 1969 on the French Riviera. Some scenes were shot in Paris.

== Music ==
"Rider on the Rain" is also the main theme of the original movie soundtrack (with lyrics by Sébastien Japrisot and sung by French chansonette Severine). The American singer-songwriter Peggy Lee wrote English lyrics for the song, and recorded it on her 1971 album Make It With You as "Passenger of the Rain".

== Release ==
=== Home media ===
In 2011, Wild East released Rider on the Rain on a limited-edition DVD alongside Adieu l'ami (Farewell, Friend), also starring Charles Bronson.

The 2009 British DVD, released by Optimum/Studio Canal contains both the French and English language versions. The French version runs a few minutes longer.

In 2019, Kino Lorber Studio Classics released a Blu-ray version that features the 114 minute U.S. cut and the 118 minute French cut. The disc features Audio Commentary, Radio Spot, Theatrical Trailers, plus Bronson Trailers for his other Kino Lorber Studio Classics releases.

== Reception ==
=== Box office ===
The film was a big hit in France, the third most popular movie of 1970.

Bronson's agent Paul Kohner said it was "the turning point for Bronson – and probably his best. In a few weeks, his name was so big in Europe that hundreds of theatres there were running old American pictures with the name Bronson above the title, even though originally he had played the third or fourth lead."

=== Critical response ===
The Los Angeles Times called the film "a spellbinding suspense and detection story, done with the kind of affectionate tip of the chapeau to the Hitchcock Hollywood mastery of the form." The Washington Post called it "one of those silk-purse-from a sow's ear exercises, fairly absorbing if you go to it casually, but possibly a cheat if you go expecting the last word in civilised movie expense." Richard Schikel wrote in Life that though the film was intended as homage to Hitchcock, it "lacks the humor, the humanity and the sure sense of mise en scène that distinguishes Hitchcock's great entertainments." In The Guardian, Philip French called it a cool, stylish, demented Hitchcockian thriller" and compared it to "Charade reworked by Claude Chabrol."

=== Accolades ===
In 1970, the film won the Special David of the David di Donatello Awards. In 1971, it won the Golden Globe Award for Best Foreign Language Film, was nominated for Best Motion Picture of the Edgar Allan Poe Awards, and for the Golden Laurel.

== In popular culture ==
The film inspired The Doors' song "Riders on the Storm".

== See also ==
- Multiple-language version
