= Jacques Villeret =

French actor (1951–2005)

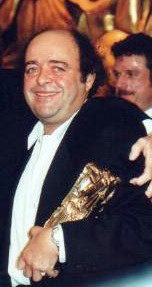
- Villeret in 1999
- Born: Jacky Boufroura; 6 February 1951; Tours, France
- Died: 28 January 2005 (aged 53); Évreux, France
- Occupation: Actor
- Spouse: Irina Tarassov (1979–1998)

Jacques Villeret (French pronunciation: [ʒak vilʁɛ]; 6 February 1951 – 28 January 2005) was a French actor, best known internationally for his role as François Pignon in the comedy Le Dîner de Cons. During his career, he earned many awards including the prestigious medal and title of Chevalier de la Légion d'Honneur.

== Life and career ==
Villeret was born Jacky Boufroura in Tours, Indre-et-Loire, France, to an Algerian father and a French mother. He studied at the Conservatoire de Paris (CNSAD), where Louis Seigner, the grandfather of Emmanuelle Seigner and Mathilde Seigner, was one of his teachers. While he was most famous for his role as François Pignon in Le Dîner de Cons; both on the stage and in the film, his other celebrated roles included the extra terrestrial in La soupe aux choux, the autistic Mo in L'été en pente douce, and marshal Ludwig von Apfelstrudel in Papy fait de la résistance.

At the time of making the film Un aller simple directed by Laurent Heynemann – a film about integration and racism and the clash of generations – Villeret said that watching the young actors in the film, Barbara Schulz and Lorant Deutsch, reminded him of the insouciance he had had as a young man with his friends at the Conservatoire.

When his career was at its height, with the success of Le Dîner de Cons, everything collapsed in a tragedy mirroring the plot of the film. Villeret separated from his wife and suffered an enormous financial downfall due to tax issues, plunging him into depression. Villeret turned to alcohol for comfort, and became an alcoholic. He isolated himself and hid away for long periods. He later said: "Alcohol is a friend, but a friend who means you harm."

Villeret's love of his profession helped to bring his career back from the brink. In an interview in 2001 he spoke of his admiration for performers like Johnny Hallyday and Jacques Brel for their level of commitment, and quoted the author Louis-Ferdinand Céline: "When I write, I put my balls on the table."

In 1979 Villeret married Irina Tarassov, an actress and writer. They separated in 1998. Tarassov wrote about their life together in her book Un jour, tout ira bien. (One day, everything will go well).

In 2002 Villeret met Seny, a Senegalese-French widow descended through her grandfather, Mor Diarra N'Dao, from a long line of Sérès nobles of the ancient Kingdom of Saloum, and they fell instantly and deeply in love. They were partners for three years, and she was about to move to Paris to be with him when he died in Évreux on 28 January 2005 of a liver haemorrhage. Seny wrote a memoir of their life together, Jacques Villeret, mon bébé blanc, which was published in Paris by Le Cherche Midi in 2005.

== Honors and awards ==
- Knight of the Order of Legion of Honour
- Knight of the Ordre des Arts et des Lettres

== Filmography ==
Year	Title	Role	Director	Notes
1973	R.A.S.	Soldier Girot	Yves Boisset	
1974	Un amour de pluie	Guillaume	Jean-Claude Brialy	
1974	The Mouth Agape		Maurice Pialat	Uncredited
1974	And Now My Love	Spectator	Claude Lelouch	
1975	Serious as Pleasure	Policeman	Robert Benayoun	
1975	The Common Man	Gérald	Yves Boisset	
1976	The Good and the Bad	Simon	Claude Lelouch	
1976	If I Had to Do It All Over Again	Real Estate Broker	Claude Lelouch	
1976	Les Naufragés de l'île de la Tortue	Bernard 'Petit Nono' Dupoirier	Jacques Rozier	
1977	Another Man, Another Chance	Customer	Claude Lelouch	
1978	Robert et Robert	Robert Villiers	Claude Lelouch	
1978	Mon premier amour	Jacques Labrousse	Elie Chouraqui	
1978	Passe montagne	Georges	Jean-François Stévenin	
1978	Un balcon en forêt	Soldier Gourcuff	Michel Mitrani	
1979	Confidences pour confidences	Job-Seeking Student	Pascal Thomas	
1979	An Adventure for Two	Uncle Musique	Claude Lelouch	
1979	Bête, mais discipliné	Jacques Cardot	Claude Zidi	
1979	Rien ne va plus	Henri Fisserman / Paul Flantier / Bouli / Dr. Delomien / Jacques du Breuil / Robert Valier / Florence / Commissaire Blandin / Le patron de La Grenade / M. Fremelin	Jean-Michel Ribes	
1981	Malevil	Momo	Christian de Chalonge	
1981	Les Uns et les Autres	Jacques	Claude Lelouch	
1981	La Soupe aux choux	The Alien	Jean Girault	
1982	The Big Brother	Inspector Coleau	Francis Girod	
1983	Danton	François Joseph Westermann	Andrzej Wajda	
1983	Effraction	Valentin Tralande	Daniel Duval	
1983	Édith et Marcel	Jacques Barbier	Claude Lelouch	
1983	Circulez y'a rien à voir	Pelissier	Patrice Leconte	
1983	First Name: Carmen	Man at the Petrol Station	Jean-Luc Godard	
1983	Papy fait de la résistance	Ludwig Von Apfelstrudel	Jean-Marie Poiré	
1983	Waiter!	Gilbert	Claude Sautet	
1984	Les Morfalous	Béral	Henri Verneuil	
1985	Drôle de samedi	Maurice	Tunç Okan	
1985	Hold-Up	Jérémie Planchet	Alexandre Arcady	
1985	Les Folles Années du twist	Mr. John Wayne	Mahmoud Zemmouri	
1986	La galette du roi	Prince Utte of Danemark		
1986	Black Mic Mac	Michel Le Gorgues	Thomas Gilou	
1986	Les Frères Petard	Momo	Herve Palud	
1987	L'été en pente douce	Maurice Leheurt, aka Mo	Gérard Krawczyk	
1987	Keep Your Right Up	Man	Jean-Luc Godard	
1988	La petite amie	Guillaume Bertin	Luc Béraud	
1988	Mangeclous	Salomon	Moshé Mizrahi	
1990	Trois années	Alexandre Guillermen	Fabrice Cazeneuve	
1991	Les secrets professionnels du Dr Apfelglück	Martineau		
1991	The Favour, the Watch and the Very Big Fish	Charles, the lingerie expert	Ben Lewin	
1992	588, rue Paradis	Alexandre	Henri Verneuil	
1992	Le bal des casse-pieds	Jérôme	Yves Robert	
1992	Le fils du Mékong	Durieux	François Leterrier	
1992	Le Batteur Du Boléro	Drummer	Patrice Leconte	Short
1992	Mayrig	Alexandre	Henri Verneuil	2 episodes
1994	Parano	Gas Station Attendant		(episode "Nuit d'essence")
1996	Golden Boy	Antoine Bonvoisin	Jean-Pierre Vergne	
1998	Le Dîner de Cons	François Pignon	Francis Veber	
1998	Mookie	Brother Benoît	Hervé Palud	
1999	The Children of the Marshland	Riton	Jean Becker	
2000	Les Acteurs	Himself	Bertrand Blier	
2001	A Crime in Paradise	Jojo Braconnier	Jean Becker	
2001	Un aller simple	Jean-Pierre	Laurent Heynemann	
2003	Strange Gardens	Jacques Pouzay	Jean Becker	
2003	Le Furet	Le Furet	Jean-Pierre Mocky	
2004	Malabar Princess	Gaspard	Gilles Legrand	
2004	Vipère au poing	Jacques Rézeau	Philippe de Broca	
2005	Iznogoud	Caliph Haroun El Poussah	Patrick Braoudé	
2005	L'Antidote	André Morin	Vincent de Brus	
2005	Grey Souls	Judge Mierck	Yves Angelo	
2005	Les parrains	Lucien	Frédéric Forestier	

== Theatre ==
- 1990 : La Contrebasse
- 1993 : Le Dîner de cons
- 2000 : Jeffrey Bernard est souffrant

== Awards ==
- 1979 : César Award for Best Actor in a Supporting Role for Robert et Robert
- 1999 : César Award for Best Actor for Le Dîner de cons
- 1999 : Lumière Award for Best Actor for Le Dîner de cons
- Chevalier des Arts et Lettres
- Légion d'honneur
