= The Lady in the Car with Glasses and a Gun (2015 film) =

- Film poster
- Directed by: Joann Sfar
- Screenplay by: Gilles Marchand; Patrick Godeau
- Based on: The Lady in the Car with Glasses and a Gun by Sébastien Japrisot
- Produced by: Patrick Godeau; Karen Monluc; Jacques-Henri Bronckart; Olivier Bronckart
- Starring: Freya Mavor; Benjamin Biolay; Elio Germano; Stacy Martin
- Cinematography: Manuel Dacosse
- Edited by: Maryline Monthieux; Christophe Pinel
- Music by: Agnes Olier
- Production companies: Alicéléo; Waiting for Cinéma; Versus Production; France 2 Cinéma
- Distributed by: Wild Bunch Distribution
- Release date: 5 August 2015 (France)
- Running time: 93 minutes
- Countries: France; Belgium
- Language: French
- Budget: €7.4 million
- Box office: $339,461

The Lady in the Car with Glasses and a Gun (French: La Dame dans l'auto avec des lunettes et un fusil) is a 2015 French-Belgian mystery thriller film directed by Joann Sfar and starring Freya Mavor, Benjamin Biolay, Elio Germano, and Stacy Martin. It is based on the 1966 novel by Sébastien Japrisot and a remake of the 1970 film about a woman who is implicated in a crime she knows nothing about and must find out about to prove she is innocent. It won the Magritte Award for Best Costume Design at the 6th Magritte Awards.

== Plot ==
Dany, a secretary, accepts an offer from her boss, Michel Caravaille, to stay overnight at his house and complete a project. Dany formerly worked with Michel's wife, Anita, who he says will be pleased to see her again. When she arrives, Dany realizes she has left her coat behind. Dany is disappointed when Michel and Anita step out for a dinner party together. While they are out, Dany falls asleep and has a dream about kissing Michel that soon turns violent, with him smothering her. Dany wakes up when Michel and Anita return home.

In the morning, Michel requests Dany accompany him and Anita to the airport to drive their expensive car back home. Afterward, left alone with the luxury car, Dany convinces herself nobody will miss it if she takes it for a joyride to see the sea. After treating herself to a shopping spree, a woman who owns a nearby café stops Dany and asks if she is feeling better. Dany insists that she did not visit any cafés in the town and leaves.

After stopping at a gas station, an unseen assailant physically assaults her, leaving her wrist injured. Several men come running when they hear her cries, but a mechanic is skeptical of her story, as he claims that she had already visited his station last night with an existing injury to her wrist. Annoyed that another person claims to recognize her, Dany says she has only just arrived and did not have any injury prior to entering the bathroom. The others are noncommittal about what they saw.

After being bandaged, Dany continues her journey to the coast, only to be stopped by a police officer who already knows her name. Concerned that she is driving with an injured wrist at night, he escorts her to a hotel. On a hunch, Dany asks the receptionist if she is already registered as a guest, which he confirms. When she points out that the handwriting is not hers, the receptionist says her injured wrist may have prevented her from signing. Confused and starting to doubt her own sanity, Dany exits the hotel and encounters a man who introduces himself as Georges.

Georges refuses to leave her car and asks for a ride. Dany initially refuses but relents when he points out she has obviously stolen the car. She explains her predicament to him, and he suggests the townspeople are playing a prank on her. When Georges learns Dany has two rooms reserved in her name, he ingratiates himself into the second room. As he flirts with her, Dany warms to him, and they have sex. As he sleeps, Dany finds Georges' passport, which has a different name on it. Though worried, she continues to allow Georges to travel with her.

Georges drives them to a scenic spot and leaves to get something from the car; when he does not return, Dany realizes he has stolen the car. Dany hitchhikes to a nearby town, where a trucker uses his CB radio to help her track down the car's current location. After stealing it back, Dany finds a rifle and corpse in the rear. Georges confronts her, and both accuse each other of murder. The two eventually resolve to dump the body and leave together, but Georges finds a note on the corpse that implicates Dany. As he grows hostile, she holds him at gunpoint, only to be knocked unconscious when he wrests the rifle from her.

When Dany wakes, she calls Anita for help, confessing to stealing her car. Anita directs her to a friend's house, where Anita says she will be safe. There, Dany finds her missing coat. Michel appears and explains that Anita had an affair. When the man blackmailed her, Anita killed him. Upset but unwilling to divorce his wife, Michel devised a plan in which she would dress as Dany and make herself conspicuous with a wounded wrist and luxury car. Michel would then murder Dany and arrange the scene to look as if it were a murder-suicide; however, Dany's joyride took her through the same route used by Anita and complicated the plan. Michel attempts to strangle her, but Dany shoots him. She then drives to the sea, last seen swimming.

== Cast ==
- Freya Mavor as Danielle "Dany" Lang
- Benjamin Biolay as Michel Caravaille, Dany's boss
- Elio Germano as the young man with dark eyes (Georges)
- Stacy Martin as Anita Caravaille, Michel's wife
- Thierry Hancisse as the mechanic
- Sandrine Laroche as the mechanic's wife
- Noémie Morales as Sylvie Caravaille
- Eléo Solet as Bertrand

== Release ==
The Lady in the Car with Glasses and a Gun was released in France on 5 August 2015, where it grossed $292,889. On 16 September, it was released in Belgium and grossed another $10,685. The film was a commercial failure.

== Reception ==
Rotten Tomatoes, a review aggregator, reports that 80% of five surveyed critics gave the film a positive review; the average rating is 6/10, based on 5 reviews. Peter Deburge of Variety wrote that viewers' imaginations would make for a better plot. Debruge concluded that it "certainly looks stunning, but it's remarkably empty-headed". Jordan Mintzer of The Hollywood Reporter called it "a stylized old-school thriller without much of a script" that is "clearly pushing style over substance." NOWToronto remarked that "director Joann Sfar is far more interested in the hazy, overheated world through which his eponymous protagonist wanders." Simon Abrams of The Village Voice called it "a movie-shaped sudoku puzzle" that has too many twists but is irresistible to puzzle over.
