= And Hope to Die =

1972 film directed by René Clément

- Original French film poster
- French: La Course du lièvre à travers les champs
- Directed by: René Clément
- Screenplay by: Sébastien Japrisot
- Based on: Black Friday (1954 novel) by David Goodis
- Produced by: Serge Silberman; Felice Colaiacomo; Franco Poccioni
- Starring: Jean-Louis Trintignant; Robert Ryan; Lea Massari; Aldo Ray
- Cinematography: Edmond Richard
- Edited by: Roger Dwyre
- Music by: Francis Lai
- Production companies: Greenwich Film Productions; Medusa Film
- Distributed by: CFCC (France); Medusa Distribuzione (Italy)
- Release dates: September 15, 1972 (France and Italy)
- Running time: 140 minutes
- Countries: France; Italy
- Language: French
- Budget: $2 million

And Hope to Die (French: La Course du lièvre à travers les champs, lit. 'The Hare's Race Across the Fields') is a 1972 crime thriller film directed by René Clément, and starring Jean-Louis Trintignant, Robert Ryan, Lea Massari, and Aldo Ray. An international co-production between France and Italy, the film centers on a French fugitive on the run in Canada (Trintignant), who becomes embroiled in a heist in Montreal. It is loosely based on the 1954 novel Black Friday by American author David Goodis.

The film was released in France on September 15, 1972.

== Plot ==
French pilot Tony Cardot is blamed for the death of three Romani children in a plane crash. Pursued by the children's relatives intent on revenge, he flees to Canada. In Montreal, Tony witnesses a shootout, takes care of a wounded man who soon dies, but not before giving Tony $15,000 and whispering the enigmatic words: "Toboggan committed suicide." Then Tony is assaulted by two thugs, Mattone and Paul, who can't find the cash on him and take him back to their hideout on an island. There he meets the group leader, an American gangster named Charley Ellis, who threatens to kill Tony if he doesn't reveal where the money is. Nevertheless, he lets Tony stay, and the two men proceed to play mind games with one another.

In the meantime, Charley's girlfriend Sugar and Paul's sister Pepper are both vying for Tony's attention. Tony succeeds in convincing the group he is also a gangster, and they enlist him in their plan: to kidnap a crucial witness in a mob trial. After the partial failure of the kidnapping and the dispersal of the gang, Tony and Charley hole up together in the gangsters hideout, waiting for the police.

== Cast ==
- Jean-Louis Trintignant as Tony "Froggy" Cardot
- Robert Ryan as Charley Ellis
- Lea Massari as Sugar
- Aldo Ray as Mattone
- Jean Gaven as Rizzio
- Tisa Farrow as Pepper
- Nadine Nabokov as Majorette
- Don Arres as Mastragos
- Aubert Pallascio as Renner
- Daniel Breton as Paul
- André Lawrence as Romani Leader
- Jean Coutu as Police Inspector
- Jean-Marie Lemieux as Lester
- Robert Party as MacCarthy #1
- Mario Verdon as MacCarthy #2
- Emmanuelle Béart as Child (uncredited)

== Production ==
On September 2, 1968, Serge Silberman's company Greenwich Film Productions acquired the rights to the novel Black Friday. Silberman was introduced to the book by Sébastien Japrisot and felt it would be a good starting point for a film. The company initially was going to the project co-financed with Les Production Jacques Roitfled under the name Tobogan. Jean-José Richer was attached to direct and Jeanne Moreau was cast as the female lead, with Lee Marvin approached to play one of the male leads. By April 190, Les Productions Jacques Roitfeld backed out of the project.

The film was a French and Italian co-production, financed by Paris-based Greenwich Film Productions and Rome-based Medusa Distribuzione.

Believing that it had to be somewhere other than France due to the lack of wide-open areas in France, he did not want to film it in the United States and opted to film it in Canada. Jean-Paul Belmondo and Henry Fonda were initially set to play the two leads, but were forced to pull out due to the production delays. Robert Ryan's voice was dubbed in French by actor/director John Berry. Shooting took place on-location in Montreal, and on sets at Billancourt and Boulogne Studios in Paris.

Sébastien Japrisot was initially hired to adapt the novel Black Friday by David Goodis that was published in France in the Série Noire. In the process of writing the script, Japrisot increasingly deviated from the source novel, adding personal motifs like scenes in Marseille where he grew up.

== Release ==
The film was released in France and Italy on September 15, 1972.

Two and a half months after the French premiere, the film was released in the United States as And Hope to Die, a shortened titles from the one given during filming, Cross My Heart and Hope to Die. This version was distributed by 20th Century-Fox and was cut to 99 minutes long with many scenes being either cut or removed entirely. This American cut of the film cut kept the opening and closing sequences with the Marseille children, while the Italian release of the film which ran for 118 minutes, did not have a single shot or scene of these parts.

== Reception ==
=== Critical response ===
Vincent Canby included it among the Ten Worst Movies of 1972, and added "if you have to, break your leg to avoid seeing it." Tony Mastroianni of Cleveland Press called it "a pretentious melodrama that aspires to being more than melodrama and which ends up being a good deal less" and said the film lacked a script, "especially one with reasonably believable dialog."

TV Guide was more positive, calling it "a moody, somewhat arty gangster film with an outstanding cast."
