= Marie Cardinal =

French writer

- Born: Simone Odette Marie-Thérèse Cardinal; 9 March 1929; French Algeria
- Died: 9 May 2001 (aged 72); Valréas, France
- Occupation: Novelist
- Writing career
- Language: French
- Genre: Literature

Marie Cardinal (born Simone Odette Marie-Thérèse Cardinal; 9 March 1929 – 9 May 2001) was a French novelist and occasional actress.

== Life and career ==
Cardinal was born in French Algeria and was the sister of the film director Pierre Cardinal. She graduated with a degree in philosophy from the Sorbonne and married the French playwright, actor and director Jean-Pierre Ronfard in 1953. They had three children; Alice, Benoit, and Benedict. From 1953 to 1960, Cardinal taught philosophy at schools in Salonica, Lisbon, Vienna and Montreal.

She published her debut novel, Écoutez la Mer (Listen to the Sea), in 1962. During the 1960s, she wrote three more novels and ventured into film, appearing in Jean-Luc Godard's Deux Ou Trois Choses Que Je Sais D'elle and playing Mouchette's mother in Robert Bresson's film Mouchette.

In 1972, Cardinal published La Clé Sur La Porte (The Key of the Door), followed by Les Mots Pour Le Dire (The Words to Say It) in 1975; these two novels were best sellers and established her reputation. Les Mots Pour Le Dire also introduced Cardinal to English-speaking readers, with Pat Goodheart's translation published in the United States in 1983 and in the United Kingdom the following year.

== Bibliography ==
- Écoutez la mer (Listen to the Sea) (1962)
- La mule de corbillard (1963)
- La souricière (1965)
- Cet été-là (1967)
- La clé sur la porte (The Key of the Door) (1972)
- Les Mots pour le dire (The Words to Say It) (1975)
- Autrement dit (1977)
- Une vie pour deux (1979)
- Au Pays de mes racines (1980)
- Le passé empiété (1983)
- Les grands désordres (1987)
- Les Pieds-Noirs (1988)
- Comme si de rien n'était (1990)
- Peer Gynt d'Henrik Ibsen (theater) (1991) translation
- Les Troyennes d'Euripide (theater) (1993) translation
- Les jeudis de Charles et Lula (1994)
- Amour... Amours... (1998)
- Oedipe à Colone de Sophocle (theater) (2003) translation
