= René Clément =

French film director and screenwriter (1913–1996)

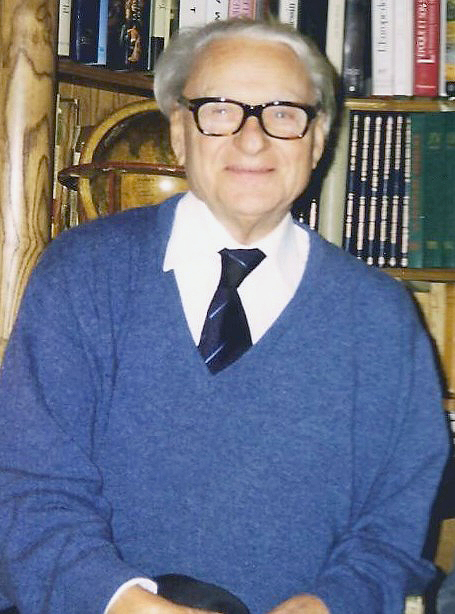
- Clément in 1995
- Born: 18 March 1913; Bordeaux, France
- Died: 17 March 1996 (aged 82); Monte Carlo, Monaco
- Education: École des Beaux-Arts
- Occupations: Film director, screenwriter
- Awards: See below

René Clément (French: [ʁəne klemɑ̃]; 18 March 1913 – 17 March 1996) was a French film director and screenwriter, active from the 1930s through the 1970s. He was considered one of his country's leading filmmakers of the post-World War II era, and continued to work steadily through the New Wave era. He won five prizes at the Cannes Film Festival, including two Best Director Awards. To date, he is the most-awarded French filmmaker at the festival.

Two of his films — The Walls of Malapaga (1949) and Forbidden Games (1952) — won the Academy Award for Best International Feature Film. Clément's other notable films included Gervaise (1956), Purple Noon (1960), Is Paris Burning (1966), Rider on the Rain (1970), and And Hope to Die (1972). He received the Honorary César in 1984.

Clément was a co-founder and President of the Institut des hautes études cinématographiques and a President of the Académie des Beaux-Arts.

== Early life ==
Born and raised in Bordeaux, Clément studied architecture at the École des Beaux-Arts where he developed an interest in filmmaking. In 1936, he directed his first film, a 20-minute short written by and featuring Jacques Tati. Clément spent the latter part of the 1930s making documentaries in parts of the Middle East and Africa. In 1937, he and archaeologist Jules Barthou were in Yemen making preparations to film a documentary, the first ever of that country and one that includes the only known film image of Imam Yahya.

== Career ==
Clément directed numerous short films during the 1930s and early 1940s. He was also Jean Cocteau's technical director on Beauty and the Beast (1946). Almost ten years passed before Clément directed a feature but his French Resistance film, La Bataille du rail (1945), gained much critical and commercial success. At the inaugural Cannes Film Festival, Clément was nominated for the Palme d'Or and won the Best Director Award. It was the first of five prizes (from 10 total nominations) Clément would receive at the festival. He was a member of the feature film jury at the 1964 festival. As of 2026, Clément remains the most-awarded French filmmaker at the festival.

From there, Clément became one of his country's most successful and respected directors, garnering numerous awards including two films that won the Academy Award for Best Foreign Language Film, the first in 1950 for The Walls of Malapaga (Au-delà des grilles) and the second time two years later for Forbidden Games (Jeux interdits). He launched the career of Alain Delon with his 1960 thriller Purple Noon, based on Patricia Highsmith's The Talented Mr. Ripley. Clément had international success with several films, but his star-studded 1966 epic Is Paris Burning?, written by Gore Vidal and Francis Ford Coppola, was a costly box office failure.

He began directing Play Dirty (a.k.a. Written in the Sand), but quit early in production due to disputes with the film's producer, Harry Saltzman. He directed the thriller Joy House (1964), with Delon and Jane Fonda.

In 1973 he was a member of the jury at the 8th Moscow International Film Festival. Clément continued to make a few films until his retirement in 1975, including an international success with Rider on the Rain that starred Charles Bronson and Marlène Jobert. In 1984 the French motion picture industry honored his lifetime contribution to film with a special César Award.

Clement was a founding member and a President of the Institut des hautes études cinématographiques in 1968. He was elected to the Académie des Beaux-Arts in 1985, and served as its president in 1990.

== Personal life ==
Clément's second wife was Irish screenwriter Johanna Harwood, whom he had met on the set of his 1954 film Monsieur Ripois.

=== Sexual harassment allegation ===
In May 2023 on Watch What Happens Live! with Andy Cohen, Fonda alleged that Clément sexually harassed her during the film's production of Joy House, telling her that the film involved a love scene and that she needed to sleep with him so that he could judge her orgasm. During the production he was 51 and she was 27.

=== Death ===
Clément died in Monaco on 17 March 1996, a day before his 83rd birthday. He was buried in the local cemetery in Menton on the French Riviera, where he had spent his years in retirement.

== Critical appraisal ==
Clément's work was often criticized by the young filmmakers of the French New Wave. François Truffaut in particular often called out Clément as indicative of the Tradition de qualité ("Tradition of Quality") that the New Wave sought to break from. Clément himself believed that the criticism, like that of his fellow luminaries Jean Delannoy and Claude Autant-Lara, hurt his career in his later years.

Conversely, Truffaut's Cahiers du Cinéma colleague André Bazin was less critical. Other critics have noted Clément's versatility across multiple genres, and his use of location filming. His oft-collaborator Alain Delon considered him a mentor figure, and dedicated his 1982 directorial effort Le Battant to him.

One critic summarized his career by saying "Among the great classic French filmmakers, René Clément has two particularities: he is the director who achieved the most success with the general public over three decades, and yet he is the least appreciated by critics, film buffs, and the general public alike."

== Retrospective ==
Clément received a retrospective at the Cinémathèque française in 2013.

== Filmography ==
=== Feature films ===
Year	Original title	English title	Functioned as		Notes
Year	Original title	English title	Director	Writer	Notes
1946	La Bataille du rail	Battle of the Rails	Yes	Yes	
1946	Le Père tranquille	Mr. Orchid	Yes	No	
1947	Les Maudits	The Damned	Yes	Yes	
1949	Au-delà des grilles	The Walls of Malapaga	Yes	No	
1950	Le Château de verre	Glass Castle	Yes	Yes	
1952	Jeux interdits	Forbidden Games	Yes	Yes	
1954	Knave of Hearts	Knave of Hearts	Yes	Yes	
1956	Gervaise	Gervaise	Yes	No	
1957	This Angry Age	This Angry Age	Yes	Yes	
1960	Plein soleil	Purple Noon	Yes	Yes	Also actor; as "Waiter"
1961	Quelle joie de vivre	The Joy of Living	Yes	Yes	Also actor; as "General"
1963	Le Jour et l'Heure	The Day and the Hour	Yes	Yes	
1964	Les Félins	Joy House	Yes	Yes	
1966	Paris brûle-t-il?	Is Paris Burning?	Yes	No	
1969	Le Passager de la pluie	Rider on the Rain	Yes	No	
1971	La Maison sous les arbres	The Deadly Trap	Yes	Yes	
1972	La Course du lièvre à travers les champs	And Hope to Die	Yes	No	
1975	La Baby-Sitter	Wanted: Babysitter	Yes	Yes	

== Awards and nominations ==
Institution	Year	Category	Work	Result	Ref.
Bodil Awards	1954	Best European Film	Jeux interdits	Won	
British Academy Film Awards	1955	Best British Screenplay	Knave of Hearts	Nominated	
Cannes Film Festival	1946	Palme d'Or	Le Père tranquille	Nominated	
Cannes Film Festival	1946	Palme d'Or	La Bataille du rail	Nominated	
Cannes Film Festival	1946	Best Director	La Bataille du rail	Won	
Cannes Film Festival	1946	Jury Prize	La Bataille du rail	Won	
Cannes Film Festival	1947	Best Adventure and Crime Film	Les Maudits	Won	
Cannes Film Festival	1949	Palme d'Or	Au-delà des grilles	Nominated	
Cannes Film Festival	1949	Best Director	Au-delà des grilles	Won	
Cannes Film Festival	1954	Palme d'Or	Knave of Hearts	Nominated	
Cannes Film Festival	1954	Jury Prize	Knave of Hearts	Won	
Cannes Film Festival	1961	Palme d'Or	Quelle joie de vivre	Nominated	
César Awards	1984	Honorary César	—N/a	Won	
Edgar Awards	1962	Best Foreign Film	Plein soleil	Won	
French Syndicate of Cinema Critics	1947	Best Film	La Bataille du rail	Won	
Venice Film Festival	1952	Golden Lion	Jeux interdits	Won	
Venice Film Festival	1956	Golden Lion	Gervaise	Nominated	
Venice Film Festival	1956	FIPRESCI Prize	Gervaise	Won	
