= Trap for Cinderella (novel) =

1962 novel by Sébastien Japrisot

- Title page for Trap for Cinderella (1964 English language edition)
- Author: Sébastien Japrisot
- Original title: Piège pour Cendrillon
- Translator: Helen Weaver
- Language: French
- Genre: Crime fiction
- Publisher: Simon & Schuster
- Publication date: 1962
- Publication place: France
- English publication date: 1964
- Media type: Print
- Awards: Grand Prix de Littérature policière

Trap for Cinderella is a psychological mystery novel by Sébastien Japrisot, originally published in French as Piège pour Cendrillon in 1962. It received the 1963 Grand Prix de Littérature policière.

It's notable for the subversion of the rules of the mystery genre: the heroine—who suffers from amnesia and tries to reconstruct her past—simultaneously takes on the roles of victim, witness, detective and murderer.

== Plot ==
A young woman wakes up in a hospital, badly burned and suffering from amnesia. She receives a new face through plastic surgery but still doesn't remember who she is. Doctor Doulin who treats her, tells her that her name is Michele Isola, also called Mickey or Mi, and she is twenty years old. She was caught in a fire accident in a seaside villa with her friend Domenica Loi, also known as Do. The latter died in the fire. When Mickey is discharged from the hospital, she comes to stay with her family friend and childhood governess Jeanne Murneau. Mickey will turn twenty-one soon, and she is expected to inherit a vast fortune from Raffermi, a rich old Italian businesswoman who once married Mi's widowed father. It turns out that Jeanne and Mickey had a love-hate relationship in the past, and Mi's behavior in the months leading to the accident was increasingly erratic, and she refused to visit the dying Raffermi.

Jeanne is reluctant to let Mickey see any of her old acquaintances. Mi suspects that Jeanne may be hiding something. Mickey becomes increasingly convinced that she is not really Michele but Domenica. When confronted with this supposition, Jeanne admits that she and Do were planning to get rid of Mi by staging a fire accident, and then pass Domenica off for Michele to receive the inheritance.

The heroine subsequently meets Serge Reppo, a young postal worker, who claims that he warned Mi of Jeanne and Do's plot several days before the accident. The survivor is then revealed to be Michele, who was able to turn the tables on Domenica. The heroine realizes that she doesn't know anything apart from what others told her, and is tormented by the uncertainty. Is she Michele or Domenica, the victim or the murderer?

== Style and structure ==
The novel subverts the conventions of the genre as the amnesiac heroine assumes all the basic roles of a mystery story: "I was the detective, the murderer, the victim and the witness, all at once." Jacques Dubois thus compares it to Alain Robbe-Grillet's The Erasers, "a novel inspired by crime fiction in which the major roles become entwined."

Susan M. Myers writes that "Japrisot has constructed his story in such a way that the text reveals, but then conceals the identity of the heroine, for each time a possible interpretation arises, doubt floods in from another source." Martin Hurcombe and Simon Kemp suggested that in this respect, the novel is not so much a "whodunit" but a "whoizit". Some critics argue that even in the end, the identity of the heroine is never adequately established.

The narrative ambiguity is reflected in the chapter titles: "I will have murdered", "I murdered", "I would have murdered", "I shall murder", "I murdered", "I murder" and "I had murdered." The bulk of the text is narrated in first person by the amnesiac protagonist. Her narration is framed by a fairy-tale style prologue (omitted in the English translation) and a very short epilogue in the style of a news item. They are both told in third person by an unidentified narrator. The chapters “I shall murder” and “I murder” are also narrated in third person but the chapters that follow identify them as transpositions of the oral accounts given to the heroine by Jeanne Murneau and Serge Reppo respectively.

== Reception ==
Trap for Cinderella was the winner of the 1963 Grand Prix de Littérature policière in France, and was described as "a Simenon proofread by Robbe-Grillet" and "Marienbad of the crime novels."

Anthony Boucher called it "a beautifully intricate essay in novel-writing and mystery-making," in which "the uncertainties and ambivalence are sustained with great skill", and added that the novel "certainly maintains Japrisot's reputation as a highly original and professional writer of murder-suspense." Martin Hurcombe and Simon Kemp write that "Japrisot's innovation... lies in the extreme juxtaposition of the competing versions of the event, and the ambiguity that results both from this and the use of an amnesiac detective, a device that has become more current since the publication of Piège." Shoshana Felman called it a "spectacular literary achievement" and "arguably the most literally remarkable crime novel ever written in French." Télérama wrote: "Sébastien Japrisot does not just play with the nerves of the reader, he takes the latter through the looking glass and then shatters it."

== Publications in English ==
- New York: Simon and Schuster, 1964
- London: Souvenir Press, 1965
- Harpenden, Herts: No Exit Press, 1990
- New York: Plume, 1997

== Adaptations ==
=== Film and TV ===
- 1965: Trap for Cinderella, French film directed by André Cayatte. Michele and Domenica are played by the same actress - Dany Carrel
- 2000: Traektoriya babochki (Trajectory of the Butterfly), Russian TV miniseries directed by Yuri Goldin and Sergei Babitsky. Michele and Domenica (here named Masha and Anya) and the amnesiac heroine are played by three different actresses
- 2013: Trap for Cinderella, British film directed by Iain Softley. Michele and Domenica are played by two different actresses - Tuppence Middleton and Alexandra Roach.

=== Stage ===
2018: Piège pour Cendrillon (France), adapted into a play by Aïda Asgharzadeh and directed by Sébastien Azzopardi at the Théâtre du Palais Royal.

== In the works of others ==
Thierry Jonquet said that his novel Mygale (1984) was inspired by Trap for Cinderella. Following Japrisot's example with the narrator taking on the quadruple role of being detective, witness, victim, and the culprit, Japanese writer Tōichirō Kujira in his mystery Futari no shinderera (Two Cinderellas, 2002) made one person performing an octuple role.
