= Waiter! =

- Theatrical release poster
- Directed by: Claude Sautet
- Written by: Claude Sautet; Jean-Loup Dabadie
- Produced by: Claude Berri
- Cinematography: Jean Boffety
- Edited by: Jacqueline Thiédot
- Music by: Philippe Sarde
- Distributed by: AMLF
- Release date: 9 November 1983 (France)
- Running time: 102 min
- Country: France
- Language: French

Waiter! (French: Garçon!) is a 1983 French film directed by Claude Sautet and starring Yves Montand, Nicole Garcia, Jacques Villeret, Marie Dubois, Dominique Laffin, and Bernard Fresson. It received 4 César nominations, for Best Actor, Best Supporting Actor (twice) and Best Sound.

== Plot ==
Alex, a former tap dancer, is an aging cafe waiter (chef de rang) in a large Parisian brasserie. He lives with his friend Gilbert, who also works at the brewery. Separated from his wife for a long time, he accumulates conquests. His dream: building an amusement park by the sea...

== Cast ==
- Yves Montand as Alex
- Nicole Garcia as Claire
- Jacques Villeret as Gilbert
- Rosy Varte as Gloria
- Marie Dubois as Marie-Pierre
- Dominique Laffin as Coline
- Clémentine Célarié as Margot
- Jean-Claude Bouillaud as Urbain
- Bernard Fresson as Francis
- Nicolas Vogel as Maxime
- Pierre-Loup Rajot as Maurice
- Marianne Comtell as Mme Pierreux
