= Lac d'Arboréiaz =

Lake in France

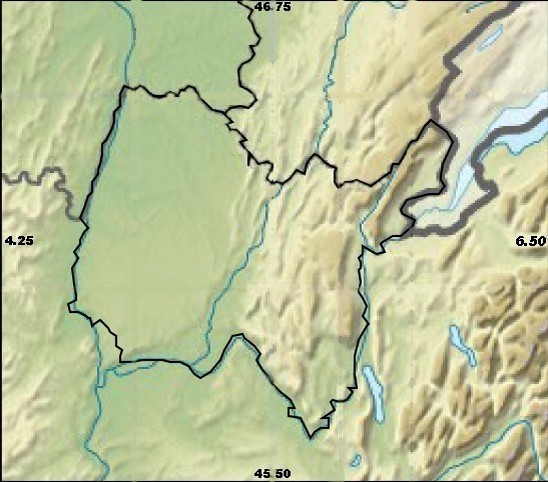
- Location within Ain
- Location: Ain
- Coordinates: 45°45′0″N 5°36′52″E
- Basin countries: France

Lac d'Arboréiaz is a lake in Saint-Germain-les-Paroisses and Colomieu in the Ain department of France.
