= Sébastien Japrisot =

French author, screenwriter and film director

- Born: Jean-Baptiste Rossi; 4 July 1931; Marseille, France
- Died: 4 March 2003 (aged 71); Vichy, France
- Occupations: Author; Screenwriter; Film director
- Writing career
- Pen name: Sébastien Japrisot; Robert Huart
- Period: 1950–2003
- Genres: Literary fiction, Crime fiction

Sébastien Japrisot (French pronunciation: [sebastjɛ̃ ʒapʁizo]; 4 July 1931 – 4 March 2003) was a French author, screenwriter and film director. His pseudonym was an anagram of Jean-Baptiste Rossi, his real name. Renowned for subverting the rules of the crime genre, Japrisot broke down the established formulas "into their component pieces to re-combine them in original and paradoxical ways." Some critics argue that though Japrisot's work may lack the explicit experimental element present in the novels of some of his contemporaries, it shows influences of structuralist theories and the unorthodox techniques of the New Novelists.

He remains little known in the English-speaking world, though all his novels have been translated into English and all but one of them have been made into films.

== Biography ==
Jean-Baptiste Rossi was born on July 4, 1931, in Paris to an Italian immigrant family. His father abandoned them when the boy was six years old. Supported by his mother, Rossi went to study with the Jesuits at the Ecole de Provence, and later at the Lycée Thiers. There he began writing his first novel Les Mal-partis.

He came to Paris to study philosophy at the Sorbonne but spent most of his time finishing his novel. It told a story of a rebellious 14-old boy in a Jesuit school, and his passionate love affair with a 26-year old nun. Despite the controversial subject matter, the book was published by Robert Laffont in 1950. It was well received in the UK (The False Start, 1951) and the U.S. (Awakening, 1952) where it sold 800,000 copies. Rossi then wrote the novella Faces of Love and Hatred, published in October 1950. He followed that by translating fiction from English to French, including several Hopalong Cassidy Westerns and works by J. D. Salinger – The Catcher in the Rye in 1953, and Nine Stories in 1961. In need to generate steady income, Rossi began working in advertising agencies, first as a writer, and then managing campaigns for Air France, Max Factor, and Formica. Rossi also had long-time interest in cinema, and producer Pierre Braunberger offered him to make a film based on a Maupassant story. Rossi replied that he preferred creating his own stories, and wrote and directed two short films: La machine à parler d’amour (1961) and L’idée fixe (1962).

In the early 1960s, he found himself owing a considerable amount in back taxes. His friend Robert Kanters, who then managed “Crime-club” collection at Denoël, offered Rossi a sizeable advance to write a crime novel. Not sure of the outcome, the writer chose the pseudonym ‘Sébastien Japrisot’ which was an anagram of his real name. Within a short period of time, he wrote two crime novels: The Sleeping Car Murders and Trap for Cinderella. The latter was awarded the Grand Prix de Littérature Policière in 1963. In 1965, both books were adapted into films, directed by Costa-Gavras and André Cayatte respectively.

Japrisot followed this with The Lady in the Car with Glasses and a Gun, which won him the 1966 Prix d'Honneur in France. It also won the Crime Writers' Association Gold Dagger for the best Thriller published in the United Kingdom in 1968 by a foreign writer. It was made into a film by Anatole Litvak in 1970 starring Samantha Eggar, Oliver Reed, and Stéphane Audran.

The 1960s and early 1970s were marked by Japrisot's further involvement with cinema. He wrote original screenplays for Farewell Friend (1968), Rider on the Rain (1970), and And Hope to Die (1972), as well as directed the film adaptation of his debut novel Les Mal-partis (1975).

He returned to literature in 1977 with the novel One Deadly Summer that received the Prix des Deux Magots in 1978. The film version, directed by Jean Becker in 1983, was awarded four César Awards, including one to Japrisot for Best Adaptation.

From then on, Japrisot would divide his time between cinema and literature. His next novel The Passion of Women was published in 1986. In 1988 he wrote and directed the semiserious thriller Juillet en septembre starring Laetitia Gabrielli and Anne Parillaud. The film was derided by critics and unsuccessful commercially, and was Japrisot's last directorial effort.

In 1990 Japrisot moved from Paris to a house he purchased near Busset, Allier. Japrisot's final novel A Very Long Engagement was published in 1991 to wide critical acclaim both in France and abroad. It was awarded the Prix Interallié the same year.

Japrisot then wrote two screenplays for Jean Becker: The Children of the Marshland (1999), adapting the 1958 novel by Georges Montforez, and A Crime in Paradise (2001), based on Sacha Guitry’s 1951 film La Poison.

He died on March 4, 2003, in Vichy. His new novel Là-haut les tambours ("Drums on the Heights") remained unfinished.

Jean-Baptiste Rossi is buried in the new section of the cemetery of Busset.

== Literary style ==
Martin Hurcombe wrote that Japrisot's four novels (from Trap for Cinderella to The Passion of Women) fit the definition of the suspense novel: "they are structured around a crime that precedes the narrative of the novel, a crime that is reconstructed in narrative form in the course of that novel." At the core of each novel is "a competition between different potential narrators of the crime." Hurcombe then concludes that "Japrisot's novels therefore place the value of narrative, and the ability to convince others through a triumphant narrative version of the crime, above the physical and objective truth concerning the same event."

Simon Kemp notes that Japrisot's two most characteristic literary techniques are subjectivity and polyphony – "restricted first-person perspectives and a none-too-harmonious chorus of voices – which together produce the unreliable narratives by which his mysteries are sustained." His novels "are narrated or focalized through characters whose restricted perspective on the events they experience keeps the reader equally in the dark until the moment of revelation comes for both of them." Japrisot enhances this effect by occasionally using present-tense narration, "giving a sense of narration simultaneous with the actions recounted, and thus avoiding the artificiality of a retrospective narrator concealing his hindsight." The polyphony in Japrisot's fiction is used to balance "the restriction of viewpoint with a proliferation of different voices in telling of the tale." Those narratives are usually concerned with disputed events involving a number of witnesses and participants. "In the course of the narrative, the reader is then presented with various accounts of the same incident by different characters." As a result, "the truth is to be sifted by the reader from the variety of partial views and inconsistent testimonies offered."

Such complex techniques make Japrisot's works hard to categorize, and pose a problem for the publishers whether to market his novels as crime fiction or literary fiction. In an interview included in the French edition of The Lady in the Car with Glasses and a Gun, Japrisot mentions the ambiguity of his situation: the crime-fiction critics find his novels too literary while the literary critics find his works too exciting.

Howard Junker called Japrisot "a great talent, whom students of the popular novel and of the narrative form in general will want to analyze."

== Literary influences ==
Japrisot claimed that he didn't like reading, and that Lewis Carroll’s Alice in Wonderland, and Ernest Hemingway’s "Fifty Grand" and other stories were all one needed to write well. He was also reportedly fond of G .K. Chesterton and Georges Simenon.

Lewis Carroll’s Alice in Wonderland and its sequel serve as a constant point of reference in Japrisot’s work, providing the epigraphs for One Deadly Summer, The Passion of Women, and A Very Long Engagement, and appearing as on-screen opening quotes in Rider on the Rain as well as in And Hope to Die. These quotes allude to the characters’ limited vision and "their inability to master the events that surround and confound them." Carroll's texts may have provided Japrisot with "the archetype of the young female protagonist in search of knowledge and identity" that figures in Trap for Cinderella, The Lady in the Car with Glasses and a Gun, One Deadly Summer and A Very Long Engagement. Just like Carroll's heroine, "Japrisot’s characters seem to have entered a dimension where certainties no longer exist and the mystery lies in knowing who you are."

== Legacy ==
Upon Japrisot's death, France's then Minister of Culture Jean-Jacques Aillagon issued a statement in which he called Japrisot a "master of storytelling, a writer appreciated by both the critics and the public" and "his greatest resource came from his love for his characters and the history of our country, which will remain the essence of his work."

The Association Sébastien Japrisot was founded in Busset in 2004 to promote and preserve his literary legacy.

A conference titled "Sébastien Japrisot: A Retrospective" was held at the University of Bristol in September 2005. A number of academics from Europe and North America gathered to discuss and assess Japrisot's contribution to crime fiction and cinema. The materials of the conference were published in 2009 as "Sébastien Japrisot: the Art of Crime." Jacques Dubois wrote in the preface: "Whilst Japrisot himself was indifferent to establishing a legacy at any cost, he nevertheless has that rare merit of compelling us to reconsider our criteria and opinions concerning great literature." Martin Hurcombe and Simon Kemp wrote that because of his reputation as merely a crime fiction author "Japrisot has failed to receive due academic consideration and this despite the fact that many of his works appear on undergraduate syllabuses in Europe and North America." They argue that though Japrisot's work may lack "the explicit experimental thrust of many of his counterparts in the 1960s and 1970s, but it also reflected and therefore popularized certain intellectual currents of his day." In his writings one can find influences of structuralist theories and the unorthodox techniques of the New Novelists, "as it breaks down the formulas of the classic detective story into their component pieces to re-combine them in original and paradoxical ways."

== Works ==
Year of publication in France	Original French title	English title / translation	Publication
1950	Les Mal Partis	The False Start = Awakening	1. The False Start. London, Secker and Warburg, 1951, 212 p.; 2. Awakening. New York, Harper [1952], 244 p.
1950	Visages de l'amour et de la haine	Faces of Love and Hatred	1. New York : New American Library of World Literature, New World Writing n° 73, 1952.
1962	Compartiment tueurs Made into 1965 Costa-Gavras film, The Sleeping Car Murders	The 10:30 from Marseille = The Sleeping-car murders Transl. by Francis Price	1. The 10:30 from Marseille. Garden City, N.Y. : Published for the Crime Club by Doubleday [1963], 181 p.; 2. The 10:30 from Marseille. London : Souvenir Press, 1964, 181 p.; 3. The Sleeping-car murders. Harmondsworth, Eng.; New York : Penguin Books, 1978, c1963, 181 p. ISBN 0-14-004992-4; 4. The Sleeping car murders. New York, N.Y. : Plume, [1997], 181 p. ISBN 0-452-27778-7; 5. The 10:30 from Marseille. London : Harvill Press, 1998, 214p. ISBN 1-86046-440-8 (pbk)
1963	Piège pour Cendrillon	Trap for Cinderella; Transl. by Helen Weaver	1. New York : Simon and Schuster, 1964, 171 p.; 2. London : Souvenir Press, 1965, 171 p.; 3. Harpenden, Herts: No Exit Press, 1990; 4. New York : Plume, 1997, 171 p. ISBN 0-452-27779-5
1965	L'Odyssexe	–	–
1966	La Dame dans l'auto avec des lunettes et un fusil	The Lady in the Car with Glasses and a Gun; Transl. by Helen Weaver	1. New York : Simon and Schuster, [1967], 240 p.; 2. London : Souvenir Press, 1968, 240 p. ISBN 0-285-50076-7; 3. New York : Penguin Books, 1980, 253 p. ISBN 0-14-005361-1 (pbk.); 4. New York : Plume, [1997], 224 p. ISBN 0-452-27777-9; 5. London : Harvill, 1998, c1967, 233p. (Panther). ISBN 1-86046-439-4 (pbk)
1968	Adieu l'ami	Goodbye, friend Transl. by Patricia Allen Dreyfus	1. London : Souvenir Press, 1969, 185 p. ISBN 0-285-50263-8; 2. New York : Simon and Schuster, [1969], 185 p.; 3. London : Corgi, 1971, 126 p. ISBN 0-552-08705-X (pbk)
1972	La Course du lièvre à travers les champs	–	–
1977	L'Été meurtrier	One Deadly Summer; Transl. by Alan Sheridan	1. New York : Harcourt Brace Jovanovich, c1980, 279 p. ISBN 0-15-169381-1; 2. Harmondsworth; New York : Penguin Books, 1981, c1980, 297 p. (Penguin crime fiction). ISBN 0-14-005846-X (pbk.); 3. New York : Plume, 1997. ISBN 0-452-27780-9; 4. London : Harvill, 2000, c1980, 279 p. ISBN 1-86046-773-3 (pbk.)
1986	La Passion des femmes	The Passion Of Women; Women in Evidence; Transl. by Ros Schwartz	1. The Passion Of Women. New York : Crown, c1990, 312 p. ISBN 0-517-56940-X; 2. Women in evidence. Harpenden : No Exit, 1995, c1990, 310p. ISBN 1-874061-25-4 (pbk.); 3. Women in evidence. New York, N.Y. : Plume, [2000], 326 p. ISBN 0-452-28162-8 (pbk.)
1991	Un long dimanche de fiançailles	A Very Long Engagement; Transl. by Linda Coverdale	1. New York : Farrar, Straus, Giroux, 1993, 327 p. ISBN 0-374-28335-4
1992	Le Passager de la pluie	Rider on the Rain; Transl. by Linda Coverdale	1. London : Harvill, 1999, 150 p. ISBN 1-86046-542-0 (pbk)

== Filmography ==
- 1961: La machine à parler d'amour (short) (director, screenwriter) as Jean-Baptiste Rossi
- 1961: L'idée fixe (short) (director, screenwriter) as Jean-Baptiste Rossi
- 1964: L'homme perdu dans son journal (short) (director, screenwriter) as Jean-Baptiste Rossi
- 1965 : Trap for Cinderella (screenwriter, based on his novel)
- 1965 : The Sleeping Car Murders (based on his novel)
- 1968 : Adieu l'ami a.k.a. Honor Among Thieves a.k.a. Farewell, Friend (UK title) a.k.a. So Long, Friend (screenwriter)
- 1970 : Rider on the Rain (screenwriter)
- 1970 : The Lady in the Car with Glasses and a Gun (based on his novel)
- 1972 : And Hope to Die (screenwriter, based on a novel by David Goodis)
- 1975 : Story of O (screenwriter, based on a novel by Pauline Réage)
- 1975 : Folle à tuer a.k.a. Mad Enough To Kill (screenwriter, based on a novel by Jean-Patrick Manchette) (uncredited at Japrisot's request)
- 1976 : Les Mal Partis (director, screenwriter, based on his novel) as Jean-Baptiste Rossi
- 1983 : One Deadly Summer (screenwriter, based on his novel)
- 1988 : Juillet en septembre a.k.a. July In September (director, screenwriter)
- 1992 : Daam Autos (The Lady in the Car), Estonia, (based on his novel The Lady in the Car with Glasses and a Gun), directed by Peeter Urbla
- 1999 : Children of the Marshland (screenwriter, based on a novel by Georges Montforez)
- 2000 : Traektoriya babochki (Trajectory of the Butterfly), Russian TV miniseries (based on his novel Trap for Cinderella)
- 2001 : Dama v ochkakh, s ruzhyom v avtomobile (The Lady in the Car with Glasses and a Gun), Russian TV miniseries (based on his novel)
- 2001 : A Crime in Paradise (screenwriter, based on La Poison by Sacha Guitry)
- 2004 : A Very Long Engagement (based on his novel)
- 2013 : Trap for Cinderella (based on his novel)
- 2015 : The Lady in the Car with Glasses and a Gun (based on his novel)

== Awards ==
- 1963 : Grand Prix de Littérature policière for Piège pour Cendrillon (Denoël, 1963).
- 1966 : Prix de l'Unanimité for Les Mal Partis
- 1966 : Prix d'Honneur for La Dame dans l'auto avec des lunettes et un fusil
- 1968 : Gold Dagger Award for the Best Crime Novel of the Year 1968 (Best Foreign) – The Crime Writers' Association for The Lady in the Car (Souvenir Press)
- 1978 : Prix des Deux-Magots for L'Été meurtrier (Denoël, 1977)
- 1981 : The Martin Beck Award – Svenska Deckarakademin (Académie suédoise) – for Vedergällningen (L'Été meurtrier)
- 1984 : César de la meilleure adaptation cinématographique (Best Adaptation) – French Academy of Cinema – for L'Été meurtrier (film de Jean Becker, 1983).
- 1991 : Prix Interallié for Un long dimanche de fiançailles (Denoël, 1991).
- 1996 : Adult Great Read (Honorable Mention) – Northern California Independent Booksellers Associated (NCIBA) (USA) for A very long Engagement
