= Bernard Fresson =

French actor (1931–2002)

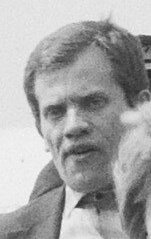
Fresson in 1960

Bernard Fresson (27 May 1931 – 20 October 2002) was a French actor who primarily worked in film.

== Biography ==
Born in Reims to a French baker, Fresson attended the Lycée privé Sainte-Geneviève, then studied law and business. He studied in Tania Balachova's drama class in Paris and later became part of Jean Vilar's Théâtre National Populaire at the Palais de Chaillot.

He made his on-screen debut in the Alain Resnais film Hiroshima mon amour as a German soldier. His notable film roles include: Gilbert in La Prisonnière (1968), Inspector Barthelmy in John Frankenheimer's French Connection II (1975), Scope in Roman Polanski's The Tenant (1976), Francis in Garçon! (1983), Morin in Street of No Return (1989) and Vincent Malivert in Place Vendôme (1998). He also appeared in the 1969 Costa-Gavras film Z.

For his roles in Garçon! and Place Vendôme, Fresson received a César nomination for Best Supporting Actor.

Fresson graduated from HEC Paris in 1953.

== Filmography ==
=== Film ===
| Year | Title | Role | Notes |
|---|---|---|---|
| 1958 | Les Copains du dimanche | Un ouvrier à la cantine | Film debut, uncredited |
| 1959 | Hiroshima mon amour | German Lover | |
| 1961 | Le Sahara brûle | | |
| 1961 | Girl in the Window | Vincenzo | |
| 1961 | Please, Not Now! | Serge, le photographe | |
| 1962 | Svenska flickor i Paris | Pierre | |
| 1962 | The Longest Day | French Commando | Uncredited |
| 1965 | Heaven on One's Head | Laurent | |
| 1965 | Cent briques et des tuiles | L'agent de police | |
| 1965 | La grosse caisse | L'employé du métro | |
| 1966 | The War Is Over | André Sarlat | |
| 1966 | Is Paris Burning? | Agent de liaison F.F.I. | |
| 1966 | Triple Cross | French Resistant Raymond | |
| 1967 | Belle de Jour | Le grele | Uncredited |
| 1967 | Thursday We Shall Sing Like Sunday | Jean | |
| 1967 | Mon amour, mon amour | Serge | |
| 1967 | Soleil Ô | | |
| 1967 | Far from Vietnam | Claude Ridder | |
| 1968 | Tante Zita | Boni | |
| 1968 | L'Écume des jours | Nicolas | |
| 1968 | Je t'aime, je t'aime | Bernard Hannecart | |
| 1968 | Adieu l'ami | L'inspecteur Antoine Méloutis | |
| 1968 | La prisonnière | Gilbert Moreau | |
| 1969 | Z | Matt | |
| 1969 | L'Américain | Raymond | |
| 1970 | Trop petit mon ami | Philippe Algir | |
| 1970 | The Cop | L'inspecteur Barnero | |
| 1970 | The Lady in the Car with Glasses and a Gun | Jean Yvain | |
| 1971 | Macédoine | Roger Vincent | |
| 1971 | Le portrait de Marianne | Alfred | |
| 1971 | Max et les Ferrailleurs | Abel Maresco | |
| 1971 | Un peu de soleil dans l'eau froide | Jean | |
| 1972 | Hearth Fires | Marc Champenois | |
| 1972 | Trois milliards sans ascenseur | Julien | |
| 1973 | Il n'y a pas de fumée sans feu | Dr. Peyrac | |
| 1974 | Ursule and Grelu | Grelu | |
| 1975 | French Connection II | Henri Barthélémy | |
| 1975 | Le futur aux trousses | Sermeuze - le PDG / Boss | |
| 1975 | Les Galettes de Pont-Aven | Le peintre professionel | |
| 1975 | It's Raining on Santiago | Un ministre | |
| 1976 | L'Ordinateur des pompes funèbres | Delouette | |
| 1976 | Mords pas, on t'aime | Georges, le père | |
| 1976 | The Tenant | Scope | |
| 1976 | Marie-poupée | Sergio - le métayer | |
| 1976 | Cours après moi que je t'attrape | Un inconnu au café | Uncredited |
| 1976 | Un type comme moi ne devrait jamais mourir | Max | |
| 1976 | Mado | Julien, l'associé de Simon | |
| 1976 | La fête des pères | | |
| 1977 | À chacun son enfer | Bernard Girard | |
| 1977 | The Passengers | Fabio | |
| 1977 | Le dernier baiser | Le mari | |
| 1978 | L'Amant de poche | Gilbert | |
| 1978 | Autopsie d'un complot | Jacques Serrano | |
| 1978 | La petite fille en velours bleu | Professeur Lherbier | |
| 1979 | On efface tout | Ballandier | |
| 1981 | L'ogre de barbarie | Duperret | |
| 1981 | Le guépiot | Claude Chénot, le père | |
| 1981 | Madame Claude 2 | Paul Barton | |
| 1982 | Espion, lève-toi | Henri Marchand | |
| 1983 | Garçon! | Francis | First César nomination |
| 1984 | Clash | Be Schmuller | |
| 1984 | Rive droite, rive gauche | François-René Pervillard | |
| 1984 | Réveillon chez Bob | Kremeur | |
| 1984 | Moving Targets | Fütterer | |
| 1985 | L'amour ou presque | Le pyromane | |
| 1987 | Sweet Lies | Mr. Leguard | |
| 1988 | En toute innocence | Serge Cohen | |
| 1988 | Bonjour l'angoisse | Commissaire Maréchal | |
| 1989 | Street of No Return | Morin | |
| 1990 | Bal perdu | Bernard d'Espira | |
| 1990 | Équipe de nuit | Schlossberg | |
| 1990 | Le dénommé (Oublie que tu es un homme) | Le parrain | |
| 1990 | Sons | Baker | |
| 1991 | Money | Henry Landau | |
| 1991 | Dingo | Jacques Boulain | |
| 1993 | Germinal | Victor Deneulin | |
| 1996 | My Man | Personnel Director | |
| 1998 | Le serpent a mangé la grenouille | Maillet | |
| 1998 | Place Vendôme | Vincent Malivert | Second César nomination |
| 2000 | Six-Pack | Paul Benetti | |
| 2000 | Taking Wing | Victor | |
| 2001 | Brotherhood of the Wolf | Mercier | |
| 2002 | L'adversaire | Le père de Christine | |
| 2002 | Les amants de Mogador | | |

=== Television ===
| Year | Title | Role | Notes |
|---|---|---|---|
| 1958–1963 | La caméra explore le temps | Chéron / Pierre de Torteville / Boudet | Historical TV series; 3 episodes |
| 1961 | L'amour des trois oranges | Gennaro | TV movie |
| 1969 | The Brothers Karamazov | Dimitri | TV movie |
| 1970 | À contre soleil | Vincent | TV movie |
| 1972 | Les Misérables | Javert | TV mini-series; 2 episodes |
| 1975 | Jo Gaillard | Commandant Joël "Jo"Gaillard | TV series |
| 1976 | The Call of the Wild | Francois | TV movie |
| 1979 | Hamlet | Claudius | TV movie |
| 1983 | Los desastres de la guerra | El General Leopoldo Hugo | Spanish TV mini-series; 6 episodes |
| 1983 | Thérèse Humbert | Romain Daurignac | TV movie |
| 1984 | Yalta | Churchill | TV movie |
| 1985 | La dixième de Beethoven | Ludwig Van Beethoven | TV movie |
| 1986 | La guerre du cochon | Julien Le Rouzic | TV movie |
| 1990 | Voyage of Terror: The Achille Lauro Affair | Pierre | TV movie |
| 1990 | La nuit africaine | Eugène Jamot | TV movie |
| 1992 | The Young Indiana Jones Chronicles | Joffre | TV series; 1 episode |
| 1995 | Shadow of a Kiss | Jean | TV movie |
| 1998 | Les brumes de Manchester | Alan Collins | TV movie |
| 2000 | Marion et son tuteur | François | TV movie |
| 2000 | Without Family | Padrone Garofoli | TV movie |
| 2003 | Jean Moulin, une affaire française | Général Delestraint | TV movie (final film role) |

== Honors and awards ==
- Chevalier or the Ordre National du Mérite
- Commandeur of the Ordre des Arts et des Lettres
- Chevalier of the Order of Legion of Honour
