= The Words to Say It =

1976 novel by Marie Cardinal

- Authors: Marie Cardinal
- Original title: Les Mots pour le dire
- Translator: Pat Goodheart
- Language: French
- Genre: autobiographical novel
- Published: 1976 (Grasset, in French); 1983 (Van Vactor & Goodheart, in English)
- Publication place: France

The Words to Say It is an autobiographical novel by Marie Cardinal, first published in French as Les Mots pour le dire in 1976. The novel deals with Cardinal's childhood in Algeria, her sense of loss on leaving, her relationship with her mother, mental illness, and recovery through psychoanalysis.
