= The Lady in the Car with Glasses and a Gun (novel) =

1966 novel by Sébastien Japrisot

- First US edition
- Author: Sébastien Japrisot
- Original title: La Dame dans l'auto avec des lunettes et un fusil
- Translator: Helen Weaver
- Language: French
- Genre: Crime fiction
- Publisher: Simon & Schuster
- Publication date: 1966
- Publication place: France
- English publication date: 1967
- Media type: Print
- Awards: Prix d'Honneur; Crime Writers' Association Gold Dagger

The Lady in the Car with Glasses and a Gun is a mystery-thriller novel by Sébastien Japrisot, originally published in French as La Dame dans l'auto avec des lunettes et un fusil in 1966. It received the 1966 Prix d'Honneur in France and the Crime Writers' Association Gold Dagger for the best crime novel of 1968 by a foreign writer.

== Plot ==
Dany Longo, a very charming and shortsighted secretary in an advertising agency, is asked by her boss, Michel Caravaille, to stay overnight at his house to type up a document for him to take on a business trip to Geneva. Caravaille is married to Anita, Dany's former colleague and roommate. In the morning, Caravaille requests Dany accompany him and Anita to the airport to drive their large American car back home. Afterward, left alone with the luxurious car and being very excited about it, Dany impulsively decides to go for a car ride. While choosing a route, Dany decides to drive to the Riviera because she has never seen the sea. On the way south, a woman who owns a roadside café stops her, and says Dany forgot her coat there the night before. Dany insists that she has never been there before and leaves. Later at a service station Dany is assaulted in the bathroom and someone injures her left hand. She is bemused as various strangers keep claiming to know her and insisting that her hand was already bandaged when they first saw her.

Heading further south she meets Philippe, and they spend the night together. The following day Philippe, who is a smalltime con man, steals Dany's car. She later finds the car abandoned in Marseille, and discovers a man's body and a gun in the trunk. She is able to locate Philippe and convince him to help her. They search the dead man's pockets and find out that his name is Maurice Kaub. Philippe also discovers there a telegram addressed to Kaub and signed by Dany. After that, Philippe hits her and leaves.

Dany enlists help from a friendly trucker named Jean Le Gueven whom she previously met on the road. He seems to be the only person who believes in her innocence. Dany asks him to pick up the coat she supposedly left in that roadside café earlier. In the meantime, Dany visits Kaub's villa in Villeneuve-lès-Avignon and oddly finds both some of her clothes and also nude pictures of herself. Afterward, she meets with Le Gueven who has brought back the coat. She finds a pay envelope in the pocket. Since she already has an identical pay envelope in her bag, Dany is now convinced of her innocence.

She returns to Kaub's villa, and finds her boss Caravaille waiting for her. She points a gun at him and warns him that she has already sent both pay envelopes to the police. Caravaille confesses that Kaub was one of Anita's lovers, whom she murdered at his home. To frame Dany, he and Anita planted evidence including the coat, and set up various incidents on the road from Avignon to Paris to establish her guilt. It was Caravaille who attacked her in the bathroom and injured her hand. Then Caravaille says he is going to turn himself in and take the blame for Kaub's murder.

== Style and structure ==
According to Simon Kemp, subjectivity in Japrisot's novels is at the root of his mystery plotting. “His texts are narrated or focalized through characters whose restricted perspective on the events they experience keeps the reader equally in the dark until the moment of revelation comes for both of them.”

The novel is divided into four parts: "The Lady", "The Car", "The Glasses", and "The Gun." "The Lady" and "The Glasses" are narrated in first person from Dany's point of view. "The Car" is told in third person from the perspectives of other characters: Manuel the car mechanic and Philippe the con man. The last part "The Gun" is narrated by Michel Caravaille who explains how the plot was carried out.

== Reception ==
The novel was the winner of the 1966 Prix d'Honneur in France and received the Crime Writers' Association Gold Dagger for the best crime novel of 1968 by a foreign writer.

Howard Junker in Newsweek called it "a chilling, baffling psychological fooler that sparkles with all the juicy terrors that can attack the heart and body", and added that Japrisot is "a great talent, whom students of the popular novel and of the narrative form in general will want to analyze." NBMagazine said that "it’s contrived but elegantly conceived", and added that "the impossibly convoluted plotting that is now common place, and so popular, in modern psychological thriller writing owes a lot to this 1966 novel." The reviewer also said "there’s a typically French wit about this thriller." Kirkus Reviews called it "a circuitous, charged photomontage with the attractive cinematic effects it will undoubtedly retain on the screen." The Guardian described it as a "fever-dream tale", "far-fetched but utterly captivating."

== Adaptations ==
- 1970: The Lady in the Car with Glasses and a Gun, French-American film directed by Anatole Litvak
- 1992: Daam Autos (The Lady in the Car), Estonian film directed by Peeter Urbla
- 2001: Dama v ochkakh, s ruzhyom v avtomobile (The Lady in the Car with Glasses and a Gun), Russian TV miniseries directed by Yuri Goldin and Sergei Babitsky
- 2015: The Lady in the Car with Glasses and a Gun, French film directed by Joann Sfar
