= Trap for Cinderella (1965 film) =

- Theatrical release poster
- Directed by: André Cayatte
- Screenplay by: Jean Anouilh; André Cayatte; Sébastien Japrisot
- Based on: Trap for Cinderella by Sébastien Japrisot
- Produced by: Alain Poiré
- Starring: Dany Carrel; Madeleine Robinson
- Cinematography: Armand Thirard
- Edited by: Paul Cayatte
- Music by: Louiguy
- Distributed by: Gaumont Distribution
- Release date: 22 October 1965
- Running time: 115 minutes
- Countries: France; Italy
- Language: French

Trap for Cinderella (French: Piège pour Cendrillon, Italian: Non sono un’assassina) is a 1965 French-Italian psychological thriller film directed by André Cayatte. It is adapted from Sébastien Japrisot's novel of the same name.

== Plot ==
The young Michèle Isola, who is about to inherit a fortune from her godmother, scarcely survives a terrible fire. When she regains consciousness it becomes evident she suffers with amnesia. Once her physical health is stable again, she is allowed to leave the hospital. Yet the currently mentally fragile patient still needs somebody to take care of her for the time being. Her former nanny Jeanne shall support her. Michèle, who is haunted by flashbacks, appreciates Jeanne's help until certain information arouses her suspicion. In secret she starts now an investigation

== Cast ==
- Dany Carrel as Michèle Isola / Dominique Loï
- Madeleine Robinson as Jeanne Mureau
- Hubert Noël as François
- Jean Gaven as Gabriel
- René Dary as doctor Doulin
- Francis Nani as Serge
- Robert Dalban as the garage owner

== Release ==
The film was commercially unsuccessful and stayed in French theaters for only five weeks, generating 120,572 admissions (Cayatte's worst box-office result since 1955's Le Dossier Noir.) It was broadcast on the French television only once in 1973. The novel's author Japrisot—who disliked the film—blocked the rights for many years keeping it out of circulation.

The film resurfaced at the Lyon Film Festival in 2019, and was released by Gaumont on DVD and Blu-ray in June 2020.
