= Trap for Cinderella (2013 film) =

- Theatrical release poster
- Directed by: Iain Softley
- Screenplay by: Iain Softley
- Based on: Trap for Cinderella by Sébastien Japrisot
- Produced by: Robert Jones; Dixie Linder
- Starring: Tuppence Middleton; Alexandra Roach; Kerry Fox; Aneurin Barnard; Frances de la Tour; Emilia Fox
- Cinematography: Alex Barber
- Edited by: Stuart Gazzard
- Music by: Christian Henson
- Production companies: Forthcoming Productions; Jonescompany Productions; Lipsync Productions
- Distributed by: Lionsgate
- Release date: 12 July 2013 (UK)
- Running time: 100 minutes
- Country: United Kingdom
- Language: English

Trap for Cinderella is a 2013 British thriller drama film written and directed by Iain Softley and starring Tuppence Middleton, Alexandra Roach, Kerry Fox, Aneurin Barnard, Frances de la Tour and Emilia Fox. Based on the novel Piège pour Cendrillon by Sébastien Japrisot, the film is about a young woman who loses her memory after surviving a fire that kills her childhood friend. Through reading her dead friend's diary, she begins to put the pieces of her shattered life back together.

== Plot ==
20-year-old Micky (Tuppence Middleton) regains consciousness in a hospital after suffering severe burn injuries requiring reconstructive surgery, and she's still suffering from amnesia. She is shown photographs of friends and relatives, but she can't recognize anybody. The doctors tell her she lives in London and her parents died in a car accident when she was 9. Her aunt, Elinor (Frances de la Tour), took care of her ever since, but had died sometime before Micky's accident.

Micky is discharged from the hospital, having recovered from her injuries but not regained her memory. Her aunt's personal assistant Julia (Kerry Fox) is now her guardian and takes Micky home. A boy named Jake (Aneurin Barnard) tries to contact her, but Julia intercepts the call and tells him that Micky is not ready to meet her friends. Later, Julia tells Micky that Jake was her boyfriend. Micky sees some photos of a friend of hers, Domenica "Do" Law (Alexandra Roach). Julia also informs Micky that when she turns 21, she's bound to inherit Elinor's entire estate.

Among the photographs, Micky finds an envelope sent by Jake. While Julia is distracted by a call, Micky takes a cab and goes to the address on the envelope, which turns out to be the office of James Chance, Elinor's lawyer as well as Jake's employer. Leaving the office before Chance could warn Julia, Micky runs into Jake, who invites her to his apartment. Jake explains they had broken up the last time they met before the accident. Not remembering anything of their past relationship, Micky bonds with Jake and they have sex. Jake gives her the keys and address to her old flat. When Micky asks Jake about Do, Jake reveals that Do died in the fire, and he's surprised Micky was not informed.

At her apartment, Micky finds Do's suitcase which contains her letters, clothes and a diary. Micky reads the diary, learning from it the details of her friendship with Do. The two of them were close childhood friends who used to vacation together with their families at Elinor's house in the South of France. They casually reconnected as adults after a long gap. Since they had last met, Do's parents had died, with her father committing suicide. During their childhood, Micky had accidentally almost caused Do to drown in the swimming pool; Micky ran away scared, Do followed her and they saw something, which caused Do's mother to take her daughter away and leave her husband.

While Micky's reading Do's diary, Julia enters the apartment and addresses her as Do, which confuses Micky, pushing her to leave. She checks into a hotel and instinctively signs the registry as Domenica Law. Micky continues to read the diary, chronicling the period that saw the girls spending more and more time together after they first reconnected. Micky had Do move to her apartment, and Do started obsessing over her, becoming jealous of Micky's relationship with Jake. After Jake and Micky broke up because of her interference, Do revealed to Micky that she was in love with her, but angry Micky didn't reciprocate. During this time, Do was also in correspondence with Elinor, receiving a cheque from her but sending it back.

Micky starts to think that she could really be Do and not Micky. She visits Julia in the morning and demands an explanation. Julia reveals that she had asked Micky and Do to visit Elinor on her deathbed in France. Julia had also privately told Do that she had read her letters to Elinor. The girls went visit Elinor, who was too sick to talk. They stayed at Elinor's house, where they used to vacation. Do called Julia up in London, who reminded her she could never be with Micky the way she wanted to, and that Micky had already ruined her life by reporting to Do's mother what the two girls had seen that day Do almost drowned: that Do's father and Elinor were having an affair, which is the reason Do's father committed suicide.

Julia then joined the girls with the news that Elinor had expired. Do finally agreed to Julia's plan: to set the house on fire and kill Micky, then go to Switzerland and undergo surgeries to make her look like Micky. The plan worked, but Do damaged her face and lost her memory after jumping from a window. After hearing all this, Micky seems to finally accept she is actually Do. Soon after, however, she's confronted by Serge, a local barman who says she still owes him. Serge recounts how he had overheard Do and Julia planning to kill Micky, allowing Micky to escape the trap. Hearing this triggers Micky's memory and she realizes she's still actually Micky, while Do really died in the fire, in spite of Micky's attempt at saving her despite everything. Micky gives Serge her expensive car to buy his silence.

Later Micky meets up with Julia, who's been to London to read Elinor's will and found out Elinor left everything to Do because she felt her affair with her father had ruined Do's life. Upon realizing that Micky is the one who survived, Julia attacks Micky but Micky manages to drown her in the swimming pool. Micky cries and walks away to the beach and swims all night in the ocean, which is final proof she's Micky as Do couldn't swim. After that, she rests on the beach and awakes in the early morning and walks out to the beach with the waters.

== Cast ==
- Tuppence Middleton as Micky
  - Ciara Southwood as Young Micky
- Alexandra Roach as Do
  - Maisie Lloyd as Young Do
- Kerry Fox as Julia
- Frances de la Tour as Aunt Elinor
- Emilia Fox as Dr. Sylvie Wells
- Aneurin Barnard as Jake
- Stanley Weber as Serge
- Alex Jennings as Chance

== Soundtrack ==
The film's soundtrack was music supervised by Universal Music Publishing Group and includes music from Cassius, Cat's Eyes, Crystal Castles, Crystal Fighters, Fixers, Glasser, James Blake, Joker ft. Jessie Ware, Metronomy, Pauline Croze, Peter Sarstedt, The Chemical Brothers and Nouvelle Vague’s cover of Joy Division ‘Love Will Tear Us Apart’.

== Reception ==
Trap for Cinderella received negative reviews from critics and audiences. Review aggregator website Rotten Tomatoes reports that the film holds a 25% approval rating, based on 16 reviews, with an average score of 4.4/10.
