= The Lady in the Car with Glasses and a Gun (1970 film) =

1970 film by Anatole Litvak

- Film poster
- Directed by: Anatole Litvak
- Screenplay by: Richard Harris; Eleanor Perry
- Based on: The Lady in the Car with Glasses and a Gun (1966 novel) by Sébastien Japrisot
- Produced by: Raymond Danon; Anatole Litvak
- Starring: Samantha Eggar; Oliver Reed; John McEnery
- Cinematography: Claude Renoir
- Edited by: Peter Thornton
- Music by: Michel Legrand
- Production company: Lira Films; Columbia Pictures
- Distributed by: Columbia Pictures
- Release dates: January 5, 1970 (UK); December 25, 1970 (US); October 22, 1970 (France)
- Running time: 105 minutes
- Language: English

The Lady in the Car with Glasses and a Gun (French: La Dame dans l'auto avec des lunettes et un fusil) is a 1970 psychological thriller film directed and produced by Anatole Litvak, and starring Samantha Eggar, Oliver Reed, John McEnery, and Stéphane Audran. It is based on the 1966 novel by French author Sébastien Japrisot. This was Litvak's final film before his death in 1974.

== Plot ==
Just before the Bastille Day holiday weekend, English secretary Danielle "Dany" Lang types up a document for her advertising agency boss, Michael Caldwell, to take on a business trip to Geneva. On the way to drop off her boss and his wife, Anita, her former roommate, at the airport, her boss gives her an envelope with her pay in it.

After dropping them off Dany impulsively decides to drive to the Riviera for the weekend. When Dany pulls into a small café the owner tries to return a coat to her, she claims she left there the day before. At a petrol station Dany is attacked in the toilet and injures her hand. She is bemused as various strangers claim to know her.

Heading further south she picks up a hitchhiker, Philippe and the pair spend the night together. The following day Philippe steals Dany's car prior to reaching the coast. She later finds Philippe in Marseille where they find a man's body and a gun in the trunk of the car.

After Philippe disappears again, Dany visits the home of the dead man in Avignon and oddly finds both some of her clothes and also nude pictures of herself. Returning to the café to reclaim the coat she finds a copy of her pay envelope in one of the coat's pockets. Dany is now completely perplexed by the situation and returns to the dead man's home where her boss, Michael, is waiting for her. He tells Dany that the dead man was one of Anita's lovers, whom she murdered at his home. To frame Dany, they planted evidence and set up various incidents to establish her guilt: the attack in the toilet was committed by Michael, who injured her hand so Anita could wear a bandage and be mistaken for the secretary; and the nude photos had been taken by Anita when they were roommates.

When Michael tells Dany he plans to murder her and make it look like a suicide she tells him he won't succeed as she has already sent both pay envelopes to the police.

== Cast ==
- Samantha Eggar as Danielle "Dany" Lang
- Oliver Reed as Michael Caldwell
- John McEnery as Yves-Marie / Philippe
- Stéphane Audran as Anita Caldwell
- Billie Dixon as Tall girl
- Bernard Fresson as Jean Yvain
- Marcel Bozzuffi as Manuel
- Philippe Nicaud as Highway policeman
- Yves Pignot as Baptistin
- Jacques Fabbri as Doctor
- André Oumansky as Bernard Thorr
- Maria Meriko as Mme. Pacaud
- Claude Vernier as Psychiatrist
- Jacques Legras as Bicycle policeman
- Martine Kelly as Kiki

== Production ==
The film was shot at Boulogne Studios and on location in Paris, Avignon, Sainte-Maxime, Marseille, Moret-sur-Loing, and Remoulins.

== Soundtrack ==
The film's score was written by Michel Legrand and the title music was On the Road sung by Petula Clark.

Track listing:

- 1. "Je Roule" sung in French by Petula Clark
- 2. "Auxerre"
- 3. "Mi, Sol, Mi, Mi, Re, Re, Mi (Avallon)"
- 4. "Auberge-Inn A Saulieu"
- 5. "Chalon-Sur-Blues"
- 6. "Macon-Sur-Marche"
- 7. "Jerk-Les-Avignons"
- 8. "Le Pont Du Gard"
- 9. "On the Road" sung in English by Petula Clark
- 10. "14 Juillet 70 "
- 11. "Un Coeur, Deux Piques"
- 12. "Guatemalteque"
- 13. "O-No-Ma-To-Pe"
- 14. "La Dame Dan L'Auto - Generique"
- 15. "Les Lunettes"
- 16. "Le Fusil"

== Reception ==
Roger Greenspun in his New York Times review said that "in relation to better works in its genre, the film looks rather like an example of the decline of craftsmanship — effective, well-colored, but uncertain in line and construction." At the same time, he praised Samantha Eggar's performance, saying "she is in herself sufficient justification for the movie." Time Out remarked that "the tortuous mystifications and ponderings...wear out their welcome long before the final gush of explanations." Time Magazine called it "one of those carefully jumbled jigsaw puzzles and comes complete with a rushed, not totally satisfactory explanation at the end." New York Magazine said "the Japrisot thriller has become an incoherent mystery with antiquely heavy handed performances by Oliver Reed, John McEnery and Samantha Eggar."

== Remake ==
The film was remade in 2015, directed by Joann Sfar, starring Freya Mavor and Benjamin Biolay.
