= Jacques Witta =

French film editor (born 1934)

Jacques Witta (born 22 April 1934) is a French film editor who began working in motion picture editing in the late 1950s. During his career, he has edited more than 60 feature films and has worked with noted French film directors such as Claude Berri and Jean Becker but is best known for his collaboration with Krzysztof Kieślowski which began with The Double Life of Véronique, and continued on Three Colors: Blue and Three Colors: Red. He was also the editor of Harrison's Flowers, which was released by Universal Pictures in the US theatrically.

Jacques Witta won the César Award for Best Film Editing on two occasions. He won in 1984 for L'Eté meurtrier (One Deadly Summer) and again in 1994 for Trois couleurs: Bleu (Three Colors: Blue).

== Selected filmography ==
- 1987 : Killing Time
- 1997 : Messieurs les enfants
- 2002 : The Assassinated Sun
- 2007 : Conversations with My Gardener
- 2008 : Love Me No More
- 2014 : Get Well Soon
