= Jean Becker (director) =

French film director and screenwriter (born 1933)

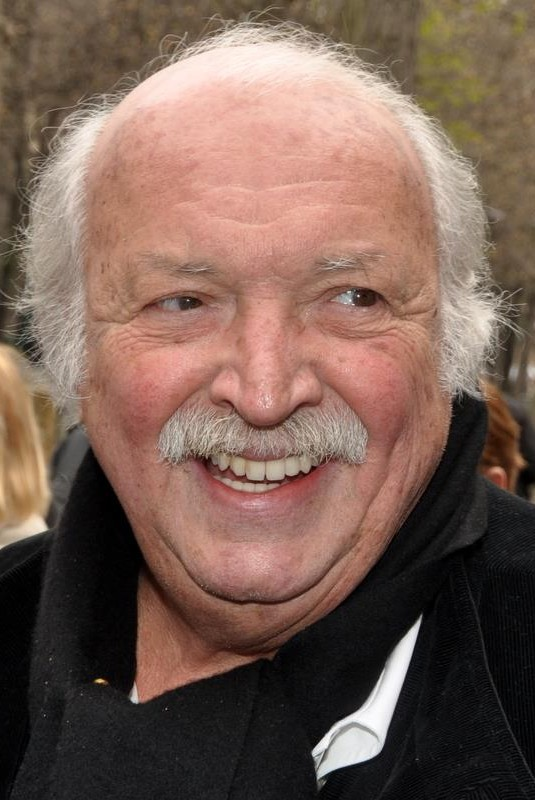
- Jean Becker in 2013
- Born: 10 May 1933 (age 93); Paris, France
- Occupations: Film director, screenwriter
- Years active: 1954–present
- Father: Jacques Becker
- Relatives: Étienne Becker (brother)

Jean Becker (born 10 May 1933) is a French film director and screenwriter. He is son of the director Jacques Becker. On 24 July 2009, he was made a Commandeur of the Ordre des Arts et des Lettres by France's culture minister, Frédéric Mitterrand.

== Filmography ==
| Year | Title | Credited as | | | Notes |
| Year | Title | Director | Screenwriter | Other | Notes |
|---|---|---|---|---|---|
| 1954 | Touchez pas au grisbi | | | Yes | First assistant director |
| 1954 | Ali Baba and the Forty Thieves | | | Yes | Assistant director |
| 1958 | Maxime | | | Yes | Assistant director |
| 1958 | The Lovers of Montparnasse | | | Yes | Second assistant director |
| 1959 | Gangster Boss | | | Yes | Assistant director |
| 1960 | The Hole | | | Yes | Assistant director and actor (uncredited) |
| 1961 | A Man Named Rocca | Yes | Yes | | |
| 1964 | Backfire | Yes | Yes | | |
| 1965–70 | Les Saintes chéries | Yes | Yes | | TV series |
| 1965 | Pas de caviar pour tante Olga | Yes | Yes | | |
| 1966 | Tender Scoundrel | Yes | Yes | | |
| 1974 | Say It with Flowers | | | Yes | Actor |
| 1977 | Take Me to the Ritz | | | Yes | Telefilm; actor |
| 1979 | La Fabrique, un conte de Noël | | | Yes | Telefilm; actor |
| 1979 | Heart to Heart | | | Yes | Actor |
| 1983 | One Deadly Summer | Yes | Yes | | Nominated—Cannes Film Festival - Palme d'Or; Nominated—César Award for Best Film; Nominated—César Award for Best Director |
| 1991 | Lest We Forget | Yes | | | Segment: "Joaquim Elema Boringue, Guinée équatoriale" |
| 1994 | Ne m'appelez pas petite | Yes | Yes | | |
| 1995 | Élisa | Yes | Yes | | |
| 1997 | La Femme du cosmonaute | | | Yes | Actor |
| 1999 | The Children of the Marshland | Yes | | | Sitges Film Festival - Gran Angular Award; Nominated—César Award for Best Film; Nominated—César Award for Best Director |
| 2001 | A Crime in Paradise | Yes | Yes | | |
| 2003 | Strange Gardens | Yes | Yes | | |
| 2007 | Conversations with My Gardener | Yes | Yes | | Nominated—Karlovy Vary International Film Festival - Crystal Globe |
| 2008 | Love Me No More | Yes | Yes | | Nominated—César Award for Best Adaptation; Nominated—Globes de Cristal Award for Best Film |
| 2008 | My Stars | | | Yes | Actor |
| 2010 | My Afternoons with Margueritte | Yes | Yes | | Gold Coast International Film Festival - Audience Award for Best Narrative Feature; Newport Beach Film Festival - Audience Award for Foreign Feature |
| 2012 | Welcome Aboard | Yes | Yes | | |
| 2014 | Get Well Soon | Yes | Yes | Yes | Also co-producer (uncredited) |
| 2018 | Le Collier rouge | Yes | Yes | | |
| 2022 | The Green Shutters | Yes | No | | |
