= Charles Gérard =

French actor and director (1922–2019)

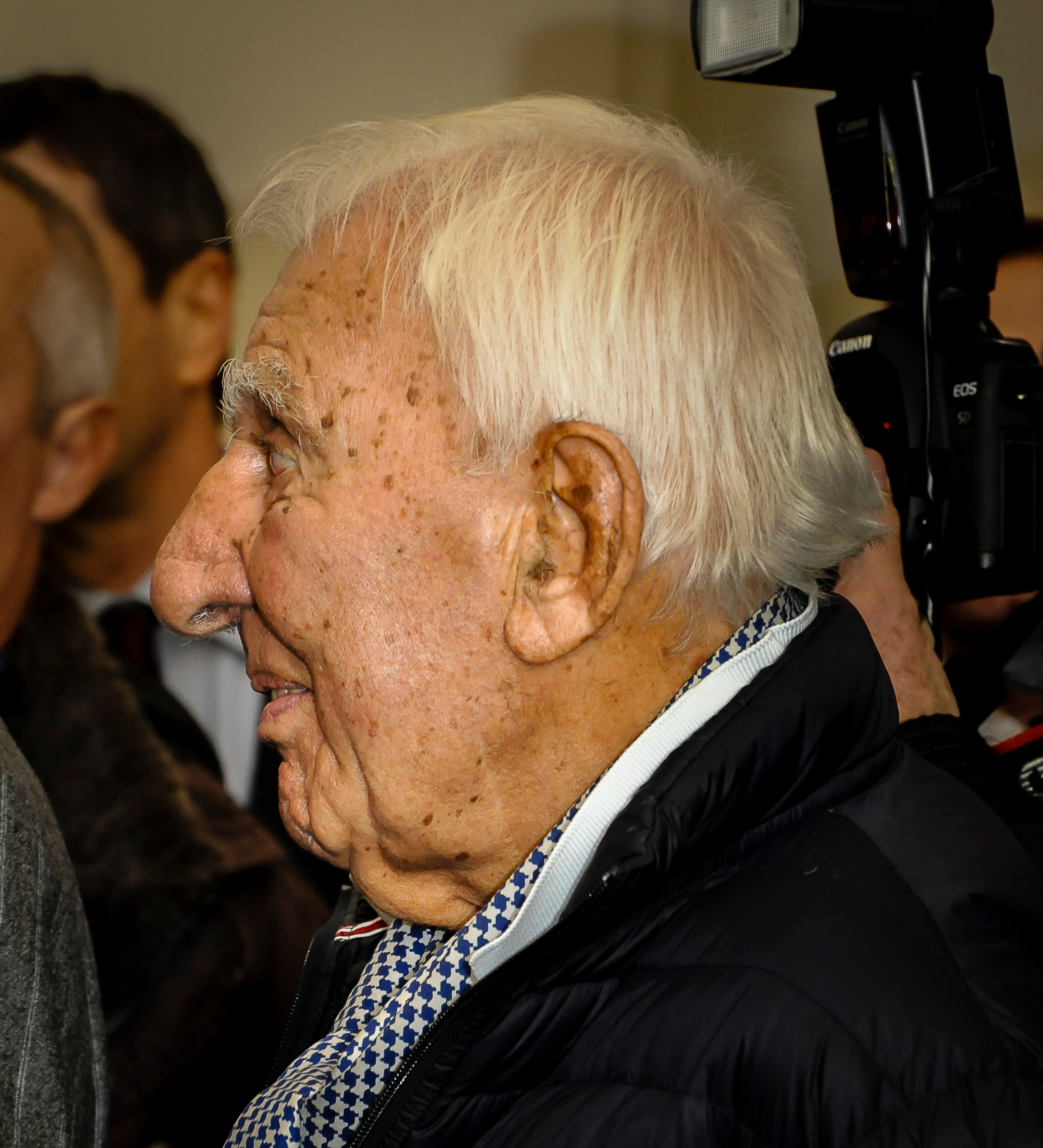
- Born: 1 December 1922; Istanbul, Turkey
- Died: 19 September 2019 (aged 96); Versailles, France
- Occupations: Actor, film director, screenwriter
- Years active: 1946–2019

Charles Gérard (born Gérard Adjémian, 1 December 1922 – 19 September 2019) was a French actor and director. He appeared in more than fifty films beginning in 1957. In many films he worked with director Claude Lelouch. He was a close friend of Jean-Paul Belmondo for over 60 years. Gérard was of Armenian origin.

== Filmography ==
=== Actor ===
Film
Year	Title	Role	Notes
1946	Back Streets of Paris	Minor Role	Uncredited
1946	Destins	Minor Role	Uncredited
1947	Voyage surprise	Un Strombolien	Uncredited
1947	Monsieur Vincent	Un galérien	Uncredited
1957	Anyone Can Kill Me	Un détenu	
1965	The Sleeping Car Murders	Un travesti près du kiosque à journaux	Uncredited
1970	Le Voyou	Charlot	
1971	Smic Smac Smoc	Smac (Jean)	
1971	It Only Happens to Others		Uncredited
1972	L'aventure, c'est l'aventure	Charlot	
1973	Happy New Year	Charlot	
1973	Un homme libre	Félix	
1973	Le Far West	Le fakir	
1974	And Now My Love	Simon's Friend	
1974	The Slap	Le voisin de Christine	Uncredited
1974	Mariage	Un ancien combattant	
1975	Un jour, la fête	Marcel	
1975	Incorrigible	Raoul	
1976	Body of My Enemy	Le chauffeur de taxi	
1976	The Toy	Le photographe	
1977	Animal	Hyacinthe	
1978	Ne pleure pas	L'entraîneur Deltreuil	
1978	Les bidasses au pensionnat	Le gardien du pensionnat	
1978	Les ringards	Charlot, dit "L'Empereur"	
1979	C'est dingue... mais on y va	Charles Beausourd	
1979	Cop or Hood	Cazauban	
1979	Les givrés	Le dragueur 1	
1979	Le mors aux dents	Ménard, le commissaire des jeux	
1979	Les Charlots en délire	Charles Roger Chabot	
1980	C'est encore loin l'Amérique?	André	
1980	Le Guignolo	Abdel Fahrad	
1981	Pétrole! Pétrole!	Prince Atiz	
1982	Qu'est-ce qui fait courir David?	William	
1982	Les diplômés du dernier rang	Le colonel	
1983	Édith et Marcel	Charlot	
1984	Viva la vie	Charles	
1984	La smala	Yvon	
1985	Ni avec toi ni sans toi	Le Parisien	
1985	Partir, revenir	Tenardon	
1986	A Man and a Woman: 20 Years Later	Charlot	
1986	Kamikaze	Le flic	
1986	Attention bandits!	Tonton	
1987	Club de rencontres	Le commissaire	
1990	Il y a des jours... et des lunes	L'homme au couteau / The cooker	
1992	La Belle Histoire	Didier Louis	
1993	Tout ça... pour ça !	Policeman	
1994	Le voleur et la menteuse	Charlot	
1998	Chance or Coincidence		
1999	One 4 All	Inspecteur Charlot	
2002	And Now... Ladies and Gentlemen	Bateau-Mouche Director	
2003	The Car Keys	L'homme qui vend sa Mercedes	
2004	Les parisiens	Un client de la bijouterie	
2005	Le courage d'aimer	Un client de la bijouterie	
2008	A Man and His Dog	Le clochard	
2012	The Players	Richard	(segment "La bonne conscience")
2013	Turf	Casquette	
2015	The Final Lesson	Charly	(final film role)

=== Director ===
- The Law of Men (1962)

=== Television ===
TV
Year	Title	Role	Notes
1978	Médecins de nuit	Le vendeur de voitures	Episode: "La décapotable"
