= Attention bandits! =

1987 film

- Directed by: Claude Lelouch
- Written by: Claude Lelouch; Pierre Uytterhoeven
- Starring: Jean Yanne; Marie-Sophie L.; Patrick Bruel; Charles Gérard; Corinne Marchand
- Cinematography: Jean-Yves Le Mener
- Edited by: Hugues Darmois; Sophie Bhaud
- Music by: Francis Lai
- Distributed by: Acteurs Auteurs Associés
- Release date: 3 June 1987 (France)
- Running time: 105 minutes
- Country: France
- Language: French
- Box office: 644,413 admissions (France)

Attention bandits! is a 1987 film directed by Claude Lelouch.

== Synopsis ==
A young criminal is framed. During a robbery, a woman is killed, and he is accused of the murder. Sentenced to 10 years in prison, he is after one thing: revenge.

== Starring ==
- Jean Yanne: Simon Verini, dit l'Expert
- Marie-Sophie L.: Marie-Sophie, dite la Princesse
- Patrick Bruel: Julien Bastide, dit Mozart
- Charles Gérard: Tonton Charlot
- Corinne Marchand: Manuchka
- Hélène Surgère: The institution director
- Edwige Navarro: Marie-Sophie enfant
- Christine Barbelivien: Françoise Verini
- Hervé Favre: The fiancé
- Ginette Garcin: The maid
- Françoise Bette
- Jean-Michel Dupuis
- Anouchka

== Reception ==
The movie received recognition for its positive portrayal of stuttering: the lead Marie-Sophie has a stutter, and the movie depicts her speech impediment as just a distinctive trait of hers, rather than as a detraction or a source of humor. While cinema attendance at the time of its release was in sharp decline in France, the film was released on June 3, 1987, and managed to take first place at the box office for its first week of operation with more than 206,000 admissions throughout the country, including more than 88,000 admissions in Paris.
