= Amidou =

Moroccan actor

- Born: Hamidou Benmessaoud; 2 August 1935; Rabat, French Morocco
- Died: 19 September 2013 (aged 78); Paris, France
- Occupation: Actor
- Years active: 1935–2013
- Awards: Rio de Janeiro International Film Festival, Cairo Film Festival

Hamidou Benmessaoud (Arabic: حميدو بنمسعود; 2 August 1935 – 19 September 2013), best known as Amidou, was a Moroccan-French film, television, and stage actor.

== Biography ==
Born in Rabat, at 17, Amidou moved to Paris to attend the CNSAD. In 1968 he made his debut on stage, in Jean Genet's Les paravents.

Amidou was best known for his association with director Claude Lelouch, with whom he shot eleven films, including Lelouch's film debut Le propre de l'homme (1960). He made his debut in a Moroccan film in 1969, starring in Soleil de printemps directed by Latif Lahlou. His career included roles in Spaghetti Westerns like Buddy Goes West and several American productions, including William Friedkin's Sorcerer, John Frankenheimer's Ronin and John Huston's Escape to Victory.

In 1969, Amidou was awarded best actor at the Rio de Janeiro International Film Festival for his role in Life Love Death by Claude Lelouch, and later won best actor awards at the Cairo Film Festival (for Pursuit by Leila Triquie) and at the Tangier Film Festival (for Rachid Boutounes's Here and There). In 2005 he received, from the hands of Martin Scorsese, a Lifetime Career Award at the International Film Festival of Marrakech. He was also the first Moroccan actor to have won an acting award at the National Conservatory of Dramatic Art.

Amidou died on 19 September 2013 in Paris, France, from an undisclosed illness.

== Filmography ==
- Le propre de l'homme (1961)
- Une fille et des fusils (1965) – Amidou
- The Grand Moments (1966) – Roger Amy
- Brigade antigangs (1966) – Broken Nose
- Live for Life (1967) – Photographer
- Fleur d'oseille (1967) – Francis
- La Fille d'en face (1968) – The seducer
- La Chamade (1968) – Etienne
- Life Love Death (1969) – François Toledo
- Soleil de printemps (1969)
- Le Voyou (1970) – Bill
- Comptes à rebours (1971) – Macyas
- Smic Smac Smoc (1971) – Smoc
- La Poudre d'escampette (1971) – Ali
- Trois milliards sans ascenseur (1972) – José
- What a Flash! (1972)
- La Punition (1973) – Raymond
- La Valise (1973) – Lieutenant Abdul Fouad
- Rosebud (1975) – Kirkbane
- Sorcerer (1977) – Kassem / Martinez
- Buddy Goes West (1981) – Girolamo / Eagle Eye
- Escape to Victory (1981) – André
- Les P'tites Têtes (1982) – Prince Douzami
- Afghanistan pourquoi ? (1983)
- La Nuit porte-jarretelles (1985)
- Adieu Blaireau (1985) – Poupée
- Catherine (1986) – Abou-al-Khayr (TV Series)
- Champagne amer (1989) – Slim
- L'union sacrée (1989) – Le Kabyle
- There Were Days... and Moons (1990) – The incredulous policeman
- La Belle Histoire (1992) – The shepherd
- Day of Atonement (1992) – Si Ali
- Unveiled (1994) – Det. Brahms
- Lalla Hobby (1996) – Haj Moussa
- Soleil (1997) – Mokzar
- Ronin (1998) – Man at Exchange
- Hideous Kinky (1998) – Sufi Sheikh
- Rules of Engagement (2000) – Dr. Ahmar
- Spy Game (2001) – Dr. Ahmed
- And Now... Ladies and Gentlemen... (2002) – Police Inspector
- Heaven's Doors (2006) – Mansour
- Moussem lamchaoucha (2009) – Haj Lamfadel
- Comme les cinq doigts de la main (2010) – Lakdar

== Theater ==
| Year | Title | Author | Director |
|---|---|---|---|
| 1961 | Ross | Terence Rattigan | Michel Vitold |
| 1965 | The Siege of Numantia | Miguel de Cervantes | Jean-Louis Barrault |
| 1966 | Henry VI | William Shakespeare | Jean-Louis Barrault |
| 1966 | The Screens | Jean Genet | Roger Blin |
