= There Were Days... and Moons =

- Directed by: Claude Lelouch
- Written by: Claude Lelouch
- Produced by: Claude Lelouch
- Starring: Annie Girardot; Jean-Louis Trintignant; Evelyne Bouix; Michel Piccoli
- Cinematography: Jean-Yves Le Mener; Michel Quenneville
- Edited by: Sophie Bhaud; Hélène de Luze
- Music by: Erik Berchot; Francis Lai
- Distributed by: AFMD
- Release date: 1990 (France)
- Running time: 117 minutes
- Country: France
- Language: French

There Were Days... and Moons (French: Il y a des jours... et des lunes) is a 1990 film directed by Claude Lelouch, in the style of a Greek tragedy, with inextricably interconnected characters fated for violence and social alienation.

== Cast and roles ==
- Gérard Lanvin - Truck driver
- Patrick Chesnais - Doctor
- Annie Girardot - Lone woman
- Marie-Sophie L. - Sophie
- Francis Huster - Priest
- Vincent Lindon - Innkeeper
- Philippe Léotard - Singer
- Jean-Claude Dreyfus - Accident's man
- Gérard Darmon - Moody policeman
- Paul Préboist - Retired man
- Serge Reggiani - Sophie's father
- Véronique Silver - Sophie's mother
- Christine Boisson - Innkeeper's wife
- Charles Gérard - Cook
- Michel Creton - Man with knife
- Claire Nadeau - Cheated woman
- Caroline Micla - Bride
- Jacques Gamblin - Husband
- Amidou - Incredulous policeman

== Production ==
The film was partially shot Carrouges (Orne).
