= Smic Smac Smoc =

1971 film by Claude Lelouch

Smic, Smac, Smoc
- Directed by: Claude Lelouch
- Written by: Claude Lelouch; Pierre Uytterhoeven
- Starring: Charles Gérard; Catherine Allégret; Amidou; Jean Collomb
- Cinematography: Claude Lelouch
- Edited by: Jeanine Boublil
- Music by: Francis Lai
- Distributed by: Les Films 13
- Release date: 1971
- Running time: 90 minutes
- Country: France
- Language: French

Smic, Smac, Smoc is a film directed by Claude Lelouch in 1971.

== Synopsis ==
Three businessmen are best friends until one of them gets married.

== Details ==
- Title: Smic, Smac, Smoc
- Director: Claude Lelouch
- Script: Claude Lelouch, Pierre Uytterhoeven
- Writers: Claude Lelouch, Pierre Uytterhoeven
- Music: Francis Lai
- Song by Charles Trenet
- Assistant director: Claude Pinoteau
- Director of photography: Claude Lelouch
- Cameramen: Daniel Vigne, Dany Lévy
- Lighting director: Jean Collomb
- Sound engineer: Bernard Bats
- Gaffer: Bernard Rochut
- Chief editor: Jeanine Boublil
- Assistant editor: Martine Lévy
- Production director: Pierre Pardon
- Press officer: Arlette Godon
- Runners: Alain Basnier, Élie Chouraqui
- Format: Colour (Eastmancolor) – 1:37.1 – 35mm
- Length: 90 minutes
- Release date: 1971

== Starring ==
- Catherine Allégret: Catherine
- Amidou: Robert, dit « Smoc »
- Charles Gérard: Charlot, dit « Smic »
- Jean Collomb: Jeannot, dit « Smac »
- Francis Lai: L'accordéoniste aveugle
- Pierre Uytterhoeven: Le pompiste
- [Arlette Gordon: Zelda, la prostituée
- Claude Pinoteau: Le commissaire
- Claude Lelouch: Un voyou

== Awards ==
- Official selection of the Venice Film Festival
- Official selection of the San Francisco Film Festival
