= L'aventure, c'est l'aventure =

- Directed by: Claude Lelouch
- Written by: Claude Lelouch; Pierre Uytterhoeven
- Produced by: Georges Dancigers; Alexandre Mnouchkine
- Starring: Lino Ventura; Jacques Brel; Charles Denner
- Cinematography: Jean Collomb
- Edited by: Janine Boublil
- Music by: Francis Lai; José Padilla
- Distributed by: Les Artistes Associés
- Release date: 1972
- Running time: 120 min
- Country: France
- Languages: French, Italian

L'aventure, c'est l'aventure (lit. 'Adventure is adventure') is a 1972 French comedy film directed by Claude Lelouch. It tells the story of five gangsters (Lino Ventura, Jacques Brel, Charles Denner, Aldo Maccione and Charles Gérard) who progress from conventional urban crime to international notoriety as celebrity kidnappers, escalating to increasingly absurd misdeeds. The film was screened at the 1972 Cannes Film Festival, but wasn't entered into the main competition.

== Plot ==
In Paris in the early 1970s, five down-on-their-luck criminals (seasoned crooks Lino, Jacques and Charles, and their underlings Aldo and Charlot) realise that the rewards from their traditional way of life are shrinking in the modern world. Lino, for example, finds that his prostitutes want to be independent entrepreneurs recognised by the state. Jacques accepts that his bank robberies yield a low net return for high risks. After much discussion, the five settle on celebrity kidnaps. Their first target is the singer Johnny Hallyday, who is delighted at the publicity and writes them a huge ransom cheque himself.

Decamping with the proceeds to Latin America, they are hired by left-wing guerillas to kidnap the Swiss ambassador. The government agree to free twenty imprisoned revolutionaries in exchange for his release. When Ernesto, leader of the rebels, refuses to pay the kidnappers' fee, they kidnap him and sell his freedom for cash to three separate buyers; his soldiers, the government, and the CIA.

The gang decamp with the proceeds to the USA, where they hijack a 747 and return it for a fee in millions. Taking a holiday break on a yacht, they are hailed by five beauties in a speedboat. When the couples have paired off, Ernesto's soldiers scramble aboard. Under torture, the five men tell him how to access their Swiss bank account. Once he has their money, he hands them over to the French police.

The five are put on trial in France; their attorney craftily claims that the trial is political rather than criminal. Worried, the justice minister arranges for them to escape and fly out of the country. Landing in Africa, their skills are in immediate demand. The army is planning a coup on the day after the Pope arrives for a visit. The gang kidnap the Pope at the airport and demand that every Catholic in the world must contribute at least one dollar for his release.

== Cast ==
- Lino Ventura – Lino Massaro
- Jacques Brel – Jacques
- Charles Denner – Simon Duroc
- Charles Gérard – Charlot
- Aldo Maccione – Aldo
- Nicole Courcel – Nicole
- Johnny Hallyday - Himself
- Yves Robert – Defense lawyer
- André Falcon – The ambassador
- Juan Luis Buñuel – Ernesto Juarez
- Gordon Heath – African general
- Prudence Harrington – The ambassador's wife
- Maddly Bamy – A vacationer (credited as Madly Bamy)
- Sophie Boudet – A vacationer
- Annie Ho – A vacationer (credited as Annie Hau)
- Annie Kerani – A vacationer
- Xavier Gélin – Lino's son
- Sevim Joyce
- Jean Berger – French President (by car)
- Henry Czarniak – The police motorcycle
- Gérard Sire – General Counsel
- Michele Alet (uncredited)
- Catherine Allégret – An activist (uncredited)
- Elie Chouraqui – A revolutionary (uncredited)
- Jean Collomb – The Pope (uncredited)
- Georges Cravenne – The president of the court (uncredited)
- Eva Damien – The political expert (uncredited)
- Michel Drucker – Himself (uncredited)
- Abder El Kebir – An activist (uncredited)
- Arlette Gordon – The flight attendant (uncredited)
- Sylvain Joubert – An activist (uncredited)
- Pierre Kast – An activist (uncredited)
- Alexandre Mnouchkine – John Davis (uncredited)
- Jacques Paoli – Himself (uncredited)
- Roger Rudel – Ministry's voice (by car) (uncredited)
- Claude Pinoteau – Ministry (by car)
- Lionel Vitrant – Man on a bicycle (uncredited)
