= Tout ça... pour ça! =

- Directed by: Claude Lelouch
- Written by: Claude Lelouch
- Produced by: Claude Lelouch
- Starring: Marie-Sophie L. Francis Huster
- Cinematography: Claude Lelouch; Philippe Pavans de Ceccatty
- Edited by: Hélène de Luze
- Music by: Francis Lai; Philippe Servain
- Distributed by: BAC Films
- Release date: 1993
- Running time: 120 min
- Country: France
- Language: French

Tout ça... pour ça! (All That... for This?!) is a 1993 French film directed by Claude Lelouch.

== Cast and roles ==
- Marie-Sophie L. - Marie Lenormand
- Francis Huster - Francis Barrucq
- Fabrice Luchini - Fabrice Lenormand
- Alessandra Martines - Allessandra Barrucq
- Vincent Lindon - Lino
- Gérard Darmon - Henri Poncet
- Jacques Gamblin - Jacques Grandin
- Évelyne Bouix - Marilyne Grandin
- Jacques Boudet - The Prosecutor
- Charles Gérard - Policeman
- Antoine Duléry - Antoine
- Céline Caussimon - Esmeralda

== Production ==
The scene in which Fabrice Luchini, Francis Huster, Alessandra Martines and Marie-Sophie L. are in a tent on top of Mont Blanc, was entirely improvised. During it, Luchini incites Martines to perform a fellatio (not seen on camera) to Huster, who seems not really comfortable.

== Awards and nominations ==
- César Awards (France)
  - Won: Best Actor – Supporting Role (Fabrice Luchini)
- Montréal Film Festival (Canada)
  - Won: Best Director (Claude Lelouch; tied with Juanma Bajo Ulloa for La madre muerta)
