= Le Voyou =

- Directed by: Claude Lelouch
- Screenplay by: Claude Lelouch; Claude Pinoteau; Pierre Uytterhoeven
- Story by: Claude Lelouch; Claude Pinoteau; Pierre Uytterhoeven
- Produced by: Georges Dancigers; Alexandre Mnouchkine
- Starring: Jean-Louis Trintignant; Danièle Delorme
- Cinematography: Claude Lelouch
- Edited by: Marie-Claude Lacambre
- Music by: Francis Lai
- Production companies: Les Films Ariane; Les Artistes Associés; Les Films 13; Produzioni Europee Associati
- Release dates: 20 November 1970 (France); 15 January 1971 (Italy)
- Running time: 120 minutes
- Countries: France; Italy
- Language: French

Le Voyou is a 1970 crime film which follows Simon the Swiss during his largest heist. The film is directed by Claude Lelouch and stars Jean-Louis Trintignant.

Le Voyou makes use of several cinematic techniques to convey the elusive nature of the title character, including a circular narrative, dialogue littered with conflicting statements, flashbacks, musical montage, multiple styles of film editing, misaligned sound editing, and movie within the movie.

== Cast ==
- Jean-Louis Trintignant as Simon Duroc, or "The Swiss"
- Danièle Delorme as Janine
- Charles Gérard as Charlot
- Christine Lelouch as Martine
- Charles Denner as Mr Gallois
- Amidou as Bill
- Judith Magre as Mrs Gallois
- Aldo Maccione as Aldo Ferrari
- Paul Le Person as Le faussaire

== Production ==
On May 2, 1969, Claude Lelouch's company Les Films 13 sold Les Films Ariane the rights to an original screenplay titled Le Rose et le Noir (lit. 'The Pink and the Black') for 750,000 francs. the project was retitled to Hostoire d'un voyou (lit. 'Story of a Hoodlum') and in March 1970, Les Films Ariane joined with Les Artistes Associés to whom Lelouch owed a picture to. Le Voyou was a French and Italian co-production. It was made by three Paris-based film production companies (Les Films Ariane, Les Artistes Associés and Les Films 13) and the Rome-based Produzioni Europee Associati The Italian company offered 30 percent of the films budget. The films title was shortly after shortened to simply Le Voyou.

The film was written by Lelouch with input from Claude Pinoteau and Pierre Uytterhoeven. Uytterhoeven had been Lelouch's collaborator since 1965 with his film La Vie, l'Amour, la Mort and Un homme qui me plait.

== Release ==
Le Voyou was released in France on November 20, 1970. In France, the film had 2,431,324 spectators, which was nearly as much as Lelouch's two previous films combined. It was the 12th highest grossing film of annual year end box office.

It was released in Italy as Voyou (La canaglia) on January 15, 1971.

Le Voyou was released in the United States as The Crook and was screened in New York on June 20, 1971. It was released in the United Kingdom as Simon the Swiss.

== Reception ==
The film won the David di Donatello for Best Foreign Direction in 1971.
