= Partir, revenir =

- Directed by: Claude Lelouch
- Written by: Claude Lelouch; Julie Pavesi; Jérôme Tonnerre; Pierre Uytterhoeven
- Starring: Annie Girardot; Jean-Louis Trintignant; Evelyne Bouix; Michel Piccoli
- Cinematography: Bernard Lutic
- Edited by: Hugues Darmois (Hachdé)
- Music by: Michel Legrand
- Distributed by: UGC Distribution
- Release date: 1985 (France)
- Running time: 117 minutes
- Country: France
- Language: French

Partir, revenir is a 1985 French film directed by Claude Lelouch.

== Cast and roles ==
- Annie Girardot - Hélène Rivière
- Jean-Louis Trintignant - Roland Rivière
- Françoise Fabian - Sarah Lerner
- Erik Berchot - Salomon Lerner
- Michel Piccoli - Simon Lerner
- Évelyne Bouix - Salomé Lerner
- Richard Anconina - Vincent Rivière
- Charles Gérard - Tenardon
- Jean Bouise - The priest
- Monique Lange - Salomé in 1985
- Marie-Sophie L. - Angéla
- Denis Lavant - Simon Lerner's patient
- Ginette Garcin - The servant of the priest
- Isabelle Sadoyan - Anna, the servant of the Rivières
- Dominique Pinon - A villager
- Bernard Pivot - Himself
- Henri Amouroux - Himself
