= 13 jours en France =

- French Film Poster
- Directed by: Claude Lelouch; François Reichenbach
- Written by: Pierre Uytterhoeven
- Produced by: Claude Chabrol
- Cinematography: Willy Bogner, Jr. Jean Collomb; Guy Gilles
- Edited by: Claude Barrois
- Music by: Francis Lai
- Production company: Les Films 13
- Distributed by: Les Films 13
- Release date: 27 September 1968
- Running time: 115 minutes
- Country: France
- Languages: French; Japanese

"13 jours en France" is a French film from 1968. Its English title is "13 Days in France." The film was directed by French filmmakers Claude Lelouch and François Reichenbach. It takes the form of a documentary-style film, featuring scenes shot in various regions of France.

The film aims to showcase different parts of France, its culture, and its beauty. It revolves around the theme of travel and exploration. "13 jours en France" is known for presenting visually captivating landscapes and glimpses of French lifestyle.

== Details ==
- Directors: Claude Lelouch and François Reichenbach
- Music : Francis Lai

== Awards ==
- Official selection of the Cannes Film Festival 1968—but the screening was cancelled due to the May 1968 events, and the film did not premiere in France until December.
