= And Now My Love =

1974 film

- And Now My Love DVD cover
- Directed by: Claude Lelouch
- Written by: Claude Lelouch; Pierre Uytterhoeven
- Produced by: Claude Lelouch
- Starring: Marthe Keller; André Dussollier
- Cinematography: Jean Collomb
- Edited by: Georges Klotz
- Music by: Charles Aznavour; Francis Lai
- Distributed by: Compagnie Française de Distribution Cinématographique (CFDC) (France); Avco-Embassy (United States)
- Release dates: 15 May 1974 (France); 21 March 1975 (USA)
- Running time: 150 min (French version); 121 min (U.S. version)
- Countries: France; Italy
- Languages: French; English

And Now My Love (French: Toute une vie), (Released as 'A Whole Lifetime' in Australia) is a French-Italian film released in 1974 by Claude Lelouch, starring Marthe Keller, André Dussollier, Charles Denner, and Charles Gérard. The American title derives from the use of the Gilbert Bécaud song "Et Maintenant" at the film's climax; the song title literally translates as "And Now," and the song became a worldwide hit when it was recorded with English lyrics as "What Now My Love".

And Now My Love was nominated for the Best Original Screenplay Oscar in 1975. The film was also screened at the 1974 Cannes Film Festival, but wasn't entered into the main competition.

== Plot ==
There are references throughout the film to contemporary world events. The story begins in pre-World War I France with a silent, black-and-white sequence where a man operating a Lumiere movie camera in a park charms a woman into turning the crank. After she bears his child while he's enlisted in the French army, he is killed in action, leaving the woman and their son with his posthumous medals.

The focus shifts to a general who awards the medals and later marries a chorus girl, only to discover her infidelity and murder her.

The film introduces Rachel Stern, the daughter of the general's murdered wife, and David Goldman, the son of the Lumiere camera operator. They connect as Jewish survivors of concentration camps, show each other their family photos, and later conceive a child named Sarah. The film transitions to color as Sarah grows up, becoming the spitting image of her mother, who dies in childbirth. David becomes a successful footwear manufacturer. On her 16th birthday, Sarah loses her virginity to a French pop star, the real life Gilbert Bécaud; he rejects her infatuation and she attempts suicide. Desperate to help Sarah move on, her father takes her on a global trip, recalling vacations he had with Rachel.

Meanwhile, Simon Duroc, a petty criminal, gets caught and sent to jail for two years. He works as a prison cook and then as the jail photographer, taking inmates' mugshots. Released, he and a business partner make a living taking surreptitious photos and then film footage as evidence of infidelity and later venture into making pornographic films. After they are jailed for censorship violations, they start making commercials and then move into feature films. They take offices in a block which also has the offices of David's business. Their initial film receives a poor critical and commercial response, forcing them back to making commercials.

Sarah tries to become pregnant with a atranger but is not successful. Now writing about her upbringing, she marries an Italian but divorces after a week, following which her father dies of a heart attack, leaving Sarah enormously wealthy. She offers workers at his company more generous conditions but their distrust leads to a strike. She goes out with the leading union activist but his cannot reconcile himself with her wealth. She then has a long term relationship with a dependable but uninspiring admirer.

Simon earns enough from the advertising work to embark on an autobiographical film, which wins an award. Finally, Sarah leaves her dull relationship to raise money for Israel in the United States, a promise she made to her father. Simultaneously, Simon also heads to New York for inspiration. They find themselves seated next to each other on the plane and the film concludes with their agreeing to see each other in New York.

== Production ==
Lelouch used the principle of Simultaneous Bilingual Film Production in making this film: for each camera setup, the actors performed twice (in English and in French), so that neither the French-language nor English-language prints are dubbed or subtitled.

Many autobiographical elements come into play, especially in the arc of the Simon Duroc character. Like Duroc, Lelouch's first feature film was widely panned, and his successful follow-up A Man and a Woman featured a sequence on the Deauville beach.

The original French version had a more dramatic ending, with the plane carrying Sarah and Simon crashing after their meeting, signifying the completion of their shared destiny.

== Cast ==
- Marthe Keller as Sarah / Rachel, her mother / her grandmother
- André Dussollier as Simon Duroc
- Charles Denner as David Goldman, Sarah's father / his father
- Carla Gravina as Carla, Sarah's Italian friend
- Charles Gérard as Charlie-Focus, Simon's friend
- Gilbert Bécaud as himself
- Sam Letrone as Sam, the restaurant owner
- Judith Magre as David Goldman's mother
- André Falcon as the lawyer
- Nathalie Courval as the lawyer's wife
- Annie Kerani as Simon's girlfriend
- Daniel Boulanger as the general
- Jacques Villeret as le spectator
- François Chalais as himself
- Gérard Sire as Monsieur Gérard,
- Gabriele Tinti as Sarah's spouse
- Élie Chouraqui as Paul, the unionist

== Music ==
The movie uses many songs by French singer Gilbert Bécaud, who also plays a fictional version of himself in the movie. For the American release, captions indicated the names of his songs and when he was singing them, as well as other lesser-known French pop songs and performers. This was instrumental in demonstrating that Bécaud, who was not a familiar figure to English-speaking audiences, was a crucial element to the story, in that both protagonists are obsessed with him and his music, and that his presence was constantly hovering over their lives.
