= A Man and a Woman: 20 Years Later =

1986 film

- French Poster
- Directed by: Claude Lelouch
- Written by: Claude Lelouch; Pierre Uytterhoeven; Monique Lange; Jérôme Tonnerre
- Produced by: Claude Lelouch
- Starring: Anouk Aimée; Jean-Louis Trintignant
- Cinematography: Jean-Yves Le Mener
- Edited by: Hugues Darmois
- Music by: Francis Lai
- Distributed by: Warner Bros. Pictures
- Release dates: 11 May 1986 (Cannes); 13 May 1986 (France)
- Running time: 112 minutes
- Country: France
- Language: French

A Man and a Woman: 20 Years Later (French: Un homme et une femme: Vingt ans déjà; literally A Man and a Woman, 20 Years Already) is a 1986 French drama film directed by Claude Lelouch and is a sequel to Lelouch's 1966 film Un homme et une femme. It was screened out of competition at the 1986 Cannes Film Festival. A follow-up to both films, The Best Years of a Life, again starring Trintignant and Aimee, was released in 2019.

== Cast ==
- Anouk Aimée as Anne Gauthier
- Jean-Louis Trintignant as Jean-Louis Duroc
- Richard Berry as Richard Berry
- Evelyne Bouix as Françoise
- Marie-Sophie L. as Marie-Sophie (as Marie-Sophie Pochat)
- Philippe Leroy as Professeur Thevenin / Professor Thevenin (as Philippe Leroy-Beaulieu)
- Charles Gérard as Charlot
- Patrick Poivre d'Arvor as himself
- Thierry Sabine as Thierry Sabine
- Antoine Sire as Antoine
- André Engel as Le metteur en scène / Film director
- Robert Hossein as Robert Hossein
- Jacques Weber as himself
- Tanya Lopert as Tanya Lopert
- Isabelle Sadoyan as The baker
- Nicole Garcia as herself in Deux sur la balançoire
