= Happy New Year (1987 film) =

1987 film by John G. Avildsen

- VHS cover
- Directed by: John G. Avildsen
- Screenplay by: Warren Lane (pseudonym of Nancy Dowd)
- Based on: La bonne année by Claude Lelouch
- Produced by: Jerry Weintraub
- Starring: Peter Falk; Charles Durning; Tom Courtenay; Wendy Hughes
- Cinematography: James Crabe
- Edited by: Jane Kurson
- Music by: Bill Conti
- Production company: Delphi IV Productions
- Distributed by: Columbia Pictures
- Release date: August 7, 1987
- Running time: 85 minutes
- Country: United States
- Language: English
- Box office: $41,000

Happy New Year is a 1987 American crime comedy film directed by John G. Avildsen and starring Peter Falk. The screenplay was written by Nancy Dowd (credited as "Warren Lane"), based on the French film Happy New Year (1973). The director of the French film, Claude Lelouch, has a cameo as a man on a train.

Although the film had extremely limited success in the theaters, it became something of a cult film. It was nominated for an Academy Award in 1988 for Best Makeup, losing to Harry and the Hendersons. Bill Conti composed the score and produced a cover of the song "I Only Have Eyes for You" performed by The Temptations which was featured extensively throughout the film.

== Plot ==
Nick and Charlie, a couple of aging thieves looking for a last score before they retire, come to ritzy Palm Beach, Florida, where they have an elaborate scheme to rob a Harry Winston jewelry store.

The shop is well-guarded and has high-tech security. Its manager, Edward, welcomes an elderly customer seeking an expensive gift for a terminally ill wife. The eager-to-please Edward has no idea that this old gentleman is a middle-aged criminal, Nick, in disguise.

Dressed as himself, Nick encounters a sophisticated, attractive woman named Carolyn Benedict who owns an antique shop next to the jewelry store. He gets better acquainted with her while haggling over a Louis XVI table that she covets, and before long a romance begins to bloom.

An old woman drops by Harry Winston, also interested in making a purchase. She, too, is Nick in disguise. During these visits to the store, Nick is casing the joint, making mental notes of the security system in place, with help from Charlie, who is pretending to be a chauffeur.

On the night of the robbery, most but not all of Nick's preparations go well. He also didn't count on the participation of Carolyn, who could be convinced to begin a new life in South America with a new partner, as long as he doesn't end up behind bars.

== Cast ==
- Peter Falk as Nick
- Charles Durning as Charlie
- Tom Courtenay as Edward Saunders
- Wendy Hughes as Carolyn
- Joan Copeland as Sunny Felix
- Fritz Bronner as Steve
- Anthony Heald as Dinner Guest
- Peter Sellars as Dinner Guest
- Daniel Gerroll as Curator
- Bruce Malmuth as Lieutenant
- Ruben Rabasa as Maitre D'
- The Temptations as Themselves
- Bruce Kirby as Taxi Driver
- Claude Lelouch as Man on Train

== Critical reception ==
Vincent Canby of The New York Times disliked the film, as he had the original film La bonne année, but had praise for the actors:

Happy New Year didn't look very original or very funny back in 1973, when the original French film, written and directed by Claude Lelouch, opened in New York. The curious thing about the American remake is that although it's no better, it's certainly not worse ... the new film has the advantage of good comic performances by Peter Falk, as the brains of the jewel heist, Charles Durning, as his partner, and Wendy Hughes ... The new version also has the advantage of the comic presence of Tom Courtenay, who plays the fastidious manager of the jewelry store and shares the film's funniest moments with Mr. Falk. These are the sequences in which Mr. Falk cases the store disguised, alternately, as a doddering Palm Beach socialite and the socialite's flirtatious, battleship-shaped sister. It's first-rate revue-sketch material. Everything else is vamping for time.

Gene Siskel, on the other hand, wrote in the Chicago Tribune on Aug. 22, 1987: "In Happy New Year you will see one of Falk's finest comic performances, a clever caper, a pair of masterful masquerades and a sweet love story."
