= Second Chance (1976 film) =

1976 film by Claude Lelouch

- Theatrical release poster
- French: Si c'était à refaire
- Directed by: Claude Lelouch
- Written by: Claude Lelouch
- Produced by: Claude Lelouch
- Starring: Catherine Deneuve; Anouk Aimée; Charles Denner; Francis Huster; Jean-Jacques Briot; Niels Arestrup
- Cinematography: Jacques Lefrançois
- Edited by: Georges Klotz
- Music by: Francis Lai
- Production company: Les Films 13
- Distributed by: Les Artistes Associés
- Release date: 13 October 1976 (France)
- Running time: 105 minutes
- Country: France
- Language: French
- Box office: $9.8 million

Second Chance (French: Si c'était à refaire, lit. 'If I Had to Do It All Over Again'; also known as A Second Chance) is a 1976 French drama film written, directed and produced by Claude Lelouch. It was released in France on 13 October 1976 by Les Artistes Associés.

== Synopsis ==
After a long time in prison, a woman discovers her son aged 14, studying under a scholarship.

== Starring ==
- Catherine Deneuve as Catherine Berger
- Anouk Aimée as Sarah Gordon
- Charles Denner as lawyer
- Francis Huster as Patrick
- Colette Baudot]as Lucienne Lano
- Jean-Jacques Briot as Simon Berger
- Niels Arestrup as Henri Lano
- Bernard-Pierre Donnadieu as Claude Blame
- Manuella Papatakis as Sarah's daughter
- Jacques Villeret as L'real estate agent
- [[Jean-Pierre Kalfon as jeweler
- Jean-François Rémi]] as le banker
- Valérie Lagrange
- Georges Staquet
- Albina du Boisrouvray
- Paul Bellaiche
- Robert Caron
- Zoé Chauveau
- Paul Deheuvels
- François Dalou
- Nicole Desailly
- Marie-Pierre de Gérando
- Paul Gianoli
- Martin Loeb
- Rita Maiden
- Alexandre Mnouchkine
- René Monard
- Chantal Mercier
- Monique Persicot
- Michel Ruhl
- Laurence Schuman
- Harry Walter
- Philippe Ziskind
- Françoise Hardy
- Elie Chouraqui
- Betty Mars
