= Le courage d'aimer =

Le Courage d'aimer
- Directed by: Claude Lelouch
- Written by: Claude Lelouch
- Produced by: Jean-Paul De Vidas
- Starring: Mathilde Seigner; Maïwenn; Massimo Ranieri
- Cinematography: Jean-Marie Dreujou
- Edited by: Stéphane Mazalaigue
- Music by: Francis Lai
- Distributed by: Les Films 13
- Release date: 29 June 2005 (France)
- Running time: 103 minutes
- Country: France
- Language: French
- Budget: $4.8 million
- Box office: $488,000

Le Courage d'aimer is a comedy-drama film directed by Claude Lelouch released on 29 June 2005. It is the result of a recutting of the first part (Les parisiens) of an unfinished trilogy - Le Genre humain with the scenes from the film that would have constituted the second film, called Le Bonheur, c'est mieux que la vie.

== Synopsis ==
A picture of humankind in Paris "a la Lelouch" : singers, shows, social gatherings, businessmen, nightclub barmen, bums, shoppers, etc.

== Starring ==
- Mathilde Seigner as Anne / Clémentine
- Maïwenn as Shaa
- Massimo Ranieri as Massimo
- Michel Leeb as Michel Gorkini
- Arielle Dombasle as Sabine Duchemin
- Line Renaud as Line
- Yannick Soulier as Sami
- Pierre Arditi as Pierre
- Ticky Holgado as God
- Michèle Bernier as Tania
- Francis Perrin as Didier
- Grégori Derangère as The real estate agent
- Lise Lamétrie as Lise
- Eric Viellard as Francesco
- Cyrielle Claire as Patricia
- Agnès Soral as A spectator
- André Falcon as The jewelry director
- Charles Gérard as The jewelry client
- Cristiana Reali as The jewelry saleswoman
- Antoine Duléry as A restaurant owner
- Mireille Perrier as The woman on the docks
- Alexandra Kazan as Sylvie
- Thiam Aïssatou as Joséphine
- Pierre Santini as Jean-Claude Bénichou
- Salomé Lelouch as Bénichou's assistant
- Alessandra Martines as Alessandra
- Olivier Minne as Le présentateur des Victoires
