= The Good and the Bad =

Le Bon et les Méchants
- Directed by: Claude Lelouch
- Written by: Claude Lelouch; Pierre Uytterhoeven
- Starring: Jacques Dutronc; Marlène Jobert; Jacques Villeret; Bruno Cremer; Brigitte Fossey
- Cinematography: Jacques Lefrançois
- Edited by: Georges Klotz
- Music by: Francis Lai, songs by Jacques Dutronc
- Distributed by: Les Films 13
- Release date: 1976
- Running time: 120 minutes
- Country: France
- Language: French

Le Bon et les Méchants is a French film directed by Claude Lelouch and released in 1976.

== Synopsis ==
From 1935 to 1945, the happiness of a couple turns to sadness when their Traction Avant is used by the gang des Tractions Avant.

== Details ==
- Director: Claude Lelouch
- Musique : Francis Lai, songs by Jacques Dutronc
- Length: 120 minutes
- Release date: 19 January 1976

== Starring ==
- Jacques Dutronc : Jacques
- Marlène Jobert : Lola
- Jacques Villeret : Simon
- Bruno Cremer : L'inspecteur Bruno Deschamps
- Brigitte Fossey : Dominique Blanchot
- Jean-Pierre Kalfon : Henri Lafont
- Alain Mottet : commissaire Blanchot
- Marie Déa : Mme Blanchot
- Serge Reggiani : chef de la Résistance
- Stéphane Bouy : Bony
- Georg Marischka : général allemand
- Philippe Léotard : vendeur de Citroën
- Alain Basnier : fils Blanchot
- Valérie Lagrange : Françoise
- Claudio Gaia : Claudio De Souza
- Arlette Emmery : Arlette
- Anne Libert : sa copine
- Étienne Chicot : Lieutenant
- Hans Verner : officier allemand
- Oskar Freitag : allemand
- Otto Frieber : allemand
- Michel Fortin : truand
- Jean Luisi : truand
- Michel Charrel : truand
- André Falcon : maire
- Michel Peyrelon : présentateur du défilé de mode
- Gérard Dournel : supérieur
- José Luis de Vilallonga : homme du couple dévalisé
- Mme de Vilallonga : femme du couple dévalisé
- Jean Mermet : vendeur de traction
- Adrien Cayla-Legrand : Charles De Gaulle
- Gérard Sire : voix narrateur/commentateur actualités/speaker radio (non crédité)
- Tony Roedel : officier allemand (non crédité)
- Jean Bessière
- Roland Neunreuther : cascadeur.

== Details ==
- The film is projected in sepia.
