= Lahlou =

Lahlou (in Arabic: الحلو) is a surname designating one of the great Moroccan families of the old medina of Fez, it is considered, alongside other ancient families of Fez, as the first elite of Morocco. There are branches of the family mainly today in Casablanca or Rabat such as the Lahlou Mimi, Lahlou Nabil, Lahlou Amine or Al-Lahlou. However, some rare branches of the family can be found in Spain such as the Lahlou Torres or even in Algeria and Tunisia.

== Family origins ==
There are many possible origins for the Lahlou family, which seem very different, indeed this family could be of European origin, from Andalusia like many other families from Fez, but a Berber or Middle Eastern origin is also possible.

=== Andalusian origins ===
One of the most probable origins is the arrival of the Lahlou from Andalusia, from Cordoba more precisely, their ancestors from Christian confession or Jewish were converted to Islam during the Muslim conquest of Spain, there are also two small branches of this family, one of the Christian faith living in Spain and the other Jewish, living mainly in Israel. The Lahlou would have settled in Fez during the 15th century following the end of the reconquista.

=== Arabic origins ===
One of the "legendary" origins often advocated by the Lahlou is an origin dating to the 7th century in Medina in Arabia. The founder of the family was a muezzin belonging to the tribe of Ibn Al-Marara (Arabic: ابن المرارة) which can be translated as a child of bitterness, seduced by his sweet voice Muhammad called out to him and on learning the name of his tribe renamed him Lahlou son of Lahlou until the last judgment (in Arabic: "حلو ابن حلو حتى يوم القيامة"), the Lahlou means "sweet" in Arabic and opposes the name of the tribe. Although this origin is strongly questioned, it can nevertheless testify to a possible origin of this family in Arabia .

=== Wattasid origins ===
This possible origin defends a membership in the Wattasid Dynasty. Ranked among the Berbers of Zenata, of the Beni Merine branch, they would be according to another version provided by the historiographer Adelouahab Benmansour, from the Sanhajian clan of Lemtouna, a descendant of the great chief Almoravid Yusuf ibn Tashfin. At the advent of the Almohades, one of their ancestors would have joined the Merinids in the Zab (southern Algeria and Tunisia). The vizier Yahya ben Yahya Wattassi is said to have achieved such power that the Merinid sultan Abd-el-Haqq Merini had him imprisoned and murdered his entire family except for the vizier's two brothers, Mohamed Lahlou and Mohamed Cheïkh, who fled into the desert. When the latter founded the Wattasids dynasty, he called on his brother to take on the duties of vizier, he is also the eponymous ancestor of the Lahlou family.

== History of the family ==
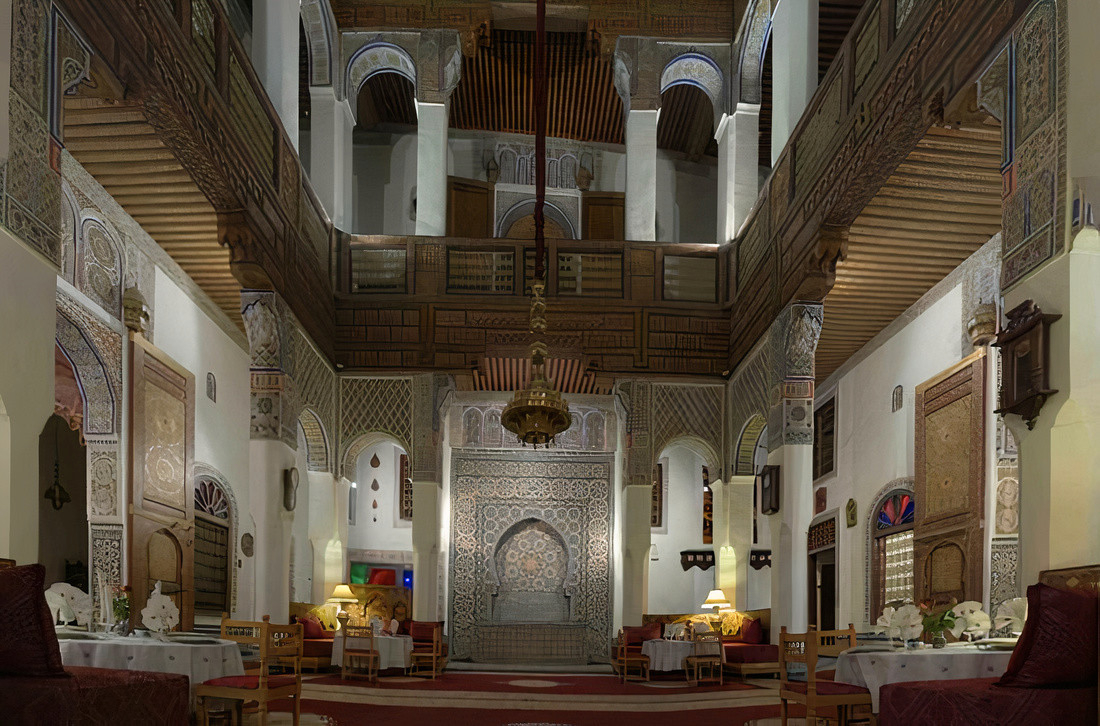
Restaurant Palais Lahlou in Fez, former riad converted into a restaurant

The Lahlous like many other families of Fez were a family of merchants or scholars, inhabitants of the old medina of the city, certainly concentrated in Fes el-Bali or Fes Jdid, several branches of the family were already distinct in the 19th century. Towards the end of the 19th century and beginning of the 20th most of the family members migrated to Casablanca and Rabat which respectively became the economic capital and the capital politics of Morocco, they were found mainly in the old medinas of the two cities, where they continued to work mainly as merchants. Today the Lahlou are one of the most numerous families in Morocco, concentrated mainly in Casablanca and Rabat, they are today still very present in the high administration as in the business world.

== Some notable Lahlou ==
- Benyounés Lahlou, Moroccan runner
- Latif Lahlou, Moroccan filmmaker
- Leila Lahlou, Moroccan writer
- Nabyl Lahlou (1945–2026), Moroccan theater director, author and actor
- Saadi Lahlou, social psychologist
