= Charles Denner =

French actor (1926–1995)

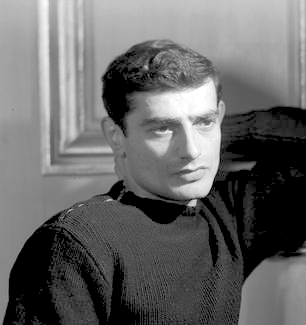
- 1958-as portréja (Studio Harcourt)
- Born: 29 May 1926; Tarnów
- Died: 10 September 1995; Dreux
- Occupations: Film actor, actor

Charles Denner (29 May 1926 – 10 September 1995) was a French actor born to a Jewish family in Tarnów, Poland. During his 30-year career he worked with some of France's greatest directors of the time, including Louis Malle, Claude Chabrol, Jean-Luc Godard, Costa-Gavras, Claude Lelouch and François Truffaut, who gave him two of his most memorable roles, as Fergus in The Bride Wore Black (1968) and as Bertrand Morane in The Man Who Loved Women (1977).

== Early life ==
Charles Denner was born in 1926 to a Yiddish-speaking Jewish family in the city of Tarnów in Galicia in south-eastern Poland. His parents were Joseph Denner, a tailor, and Jenta Micenmacher. He had a sister, Élise, and two brothers, Alfred and Jacques. When he was four, the family emigrated to France.

During World War II, his family took refuge in Brive-la-Gaillarde, where they were helped by Rabbi David Feuerwerker. Denner served as a Free French partisan in the Vercors mountains and destroyed a Nazi SS truck with a grenade; he was wounded and later received the Croix de Guerre for this operation.

Passionate about theatre from his childhood, Denner became a student of Charles Dullin, a famous theatre teacher of his time, under whose guidance he remained until 1945. Another great figure of French theatre, Jean Vilar, impressed by Denner's performance at Les mamelles de Tirésias (The Breasts of Tiresias), called him four years after he left Vilar to join the Théâtre National Populaire (TNP). It was there that he gave some of his earliest stage performances, in plays such as Heinrich von Kleist's Prinz Friedrich von Homburg and Alfred de Musset's Lorenzaccio, among others.

== Career ==
In 1955, director Yves Allégret offered Denner a small role in La Meilleure part (The Best Part), thus introducing him for the first time to cinema audiences. Two years later, in 1957, he secured another secondary role in Louis Malle's legendary Elevator to the Gallows, alongside Jeanne Moreau, a co-performer of his from the days of the TNP.

In 1962 Jean-Luc Godard wanted to film Jean Giraudoux's play Pour Lucrèce starring Denner along with Sami Frey and Michel Piccoli, but when cast and crew had already been assembled he called off the shoot on the first day of filming after a prolonged downpour caused a long delay.

In 1963 Denner was offered his first leading role by Claude Chabrol in Landru, a film considered by many as his greatest on-screen performance. Despite his growing recognition on the big screen, the stage remained his true passion. He gave his most memorable performances in plays such as Molière's Les Fourberies de Scapin (Scapin's Schemings) and Brecht's Drums in the Night.

== Death ==
On 10 September 1995 Denner died of pneumonia in Dreux, France.

== Filmography ==
Year	Title	Role	Director	Notes
1954	Poisson d'avril	a guest in a café	Gilles Grangier	Uncredited
1954	Men in White	Un interne	Ralph Habib	
1954	La Meilleure Part	Un ingénieur adjoint	Yves Allégret	
1958	Elevator to the Gallows	L'adjoint du commissaire Cherrier	Louis Malle	
1963	Bluebeard	Henri Désiré Landru	Claude Chabrol	
1964	La Vie à l'envers	Jacques Valin	Alain Jessua	
1964	Les plus belles escroqueries du monde	the swindler	Jean-Luc Godard	(segment "Le Grand Escroq") (scenes deleted)
1964	Les Pieds nickelés	Filochard	Jean-Claude Chambon	
1964	Mata Hari, Agent H21	Soldier #1	Jean-Louis Richard	Uncredited
1965	Marie-Chantal contre le docteur Kha	Johnson	Claude Chabrol	
1965	The Sleeping Car Murders	Bob Vaski - l'amant de Georgette	Costa-Gavras	
1966	YUL 871	L'ingénieur européen	Jacques Godbout	
1967	The Thief of Paris	Jean-François Cannonier	Louis Malle	
1967	The Two of Us	Monsieur Langmann	Claude Berri	
1968	The Bride Wore Black	Fergus	François Truffaut	
1968	La trêve	Julien	Claude Guillemot	
1969	Z	Manuel	Costa-Gavras	
1969	Le corps de Diane	Julien Keller	Jean-Louis Richard	
1970	Le Voyou	Monsieur Gallois	Claude Lelouch	
1971	The Married Couple of the Year Two	the traveller	Jean-Paul Rappeneau	
1971	Les Assassins de l'ordre	Graziani	Marcel Carné	
1972	L'aventure, c'est l'aventure	Simon Duroc	Claude Lelouch	
1972	Such a Gorgeous Kid Like Me	Arthur	François Truffaut	
1973	The Inheritor	David Loweinstein	Philippe Labro	
1973	Un officier de police sans importance	Serge Monnier	Jean Larriaga	
1973	Défense de savoir	Jean Ravier	Nadine Trintignant	
1974	The Holes	Ministre des travaux publics	Pierre Tchernia	
1974	And Now My Love	David Goldman	Claude Lelouch	
1975	Peur sur la ville	Inspector Moissac	Henri Verneuil	
1975	Vous ne l'emporterez pas au paradis	Nicolas	François Dupont-Midi	
1976	If I Had to Do It All Over Again	the lawyer	Claude Lelouch	
1976	Mado	Reynald Manecca	Claude Sautet	
1976	La Première Fois	Father	Claude Berri	
1977	The Man Who Loved Women	Bertrand Morane	François Truffaut	
1978	Robert et Robert	Robert Goldman	Claude Lelouch	
1980	La verdad sobre el caso Savolta	Lepprince	Antonio Drove	
1980	Le coeur à l'envers	Guillaume	Franck Apprederis	
1982	Mille milliards de dollars	Walte	Henri Verneuil	
1982	A Captain's Honor	Maître Gillard - un avocat	Pierre Schoendoerffer	
1983	Rock 'n Torah	Joseph, le père d'Isaac	Marc-André Grynbaum	
1983	Stella	Richard	Laurent Heynemann	
1986	L'unique	Vox, le producteur	Jérôme Diamant-Berger	
1986	Golden Eighties	M. Schwartz	Chantal Akerman	(final film role)
