= La femme spectacle =

- Directed by: Claude Lelouch
- Written by: Claude Lelouch
- Produced by: Pierre Braunberger
- Starring: Jean Yanne; Jean-Pierre Kalfon; Gérard Sire
- Cinematography: Jean Collomb
- Edited by: Claude Barrois; Jacqueline Lecomte
- Music by: Georges Moustaki
- Distributed by: Les Films de la Pléiade
- Release date: 1964 (France)
- Running time: 84 minutes
- Country: France
- Language: French

La Femme spectacle is a film directed by Claude Lelouch in 1964.

== Synopsis ==
The film is an essay regarding the "female object".

== Details ==
- Director: Claude Lelouch
- Music:
- Length : 100 minutes
- Release date: 1964

== Starring ==
- Jean Yanne
- Gérard Sire
