= C'était un rendez-vous =

1976 short film by Claude Lelouch

- Cover art for the DVD release
- Directed by: Claude Lelouch
- Written by: Claude Lelouch
- Cinematography: Jacques Lefrançois
- Distributed by: Spirit Level Film (DVD)
- Release date: 1976
- Running time: 9 minutes
- Country: France

C'était un rendez-vous (English: It Was a Date) is a 1976 French short film directed by Claude Lelouch, showing a high-speed drive through Paris.

== Plot ==
The film shows an eight-minute drive through Paris during the early hours (05:30) of a Sunday morning in August (when much of Paris is on summer vacation), accompanied by sounds of a high-revving engine, gear changes and squealing tyres. It starts in a tunnel of the Paris Périphérique at Porte Dauphine, with an on-board view from an unseen car exiting up on a slip road to Avenue Foch. Well-known landmarks such as the Arc de Triomphe, Palais Garnier, and Place de la Concorde with its obelisk are passed, as well as the Champs-Élysées. Pedestrians are passed, pigeons sitting on the streets are scattered, red lights are ignored, one-way streets are driven up the wrong way, centre lines are crossed, and the car drives on the sidewalk to avoid a rubbish lorry. The car is never seen as the camera seems to be attached below the front bumper (judging from the relative positions of other cars, the visible headlight beam and the final shot when the car is parked in front of a kerb on Montmartre, with the famous Sacré-Cœur Basilica behind, and out of shot). Here, the driver gets out and embraces a young blonde woman as bells ring in the background, with the famous backdrop of Paris.

== Cast ==
- Gunilla Friden as La fille
- Claude Lelouch as L'homme (uncredited)

== Production ==
Shot in a single take, it is an example of cinéma vérité. The length of the film was limited by the short capacity of the 1000 foot 35mm film reel, and filmed from a (supposedly) gyro-stabilised camera mounted on the bumper of a Mercedes-Benz 450SEL 6.9. A photo has surfaced that seems to reveal an Eclair cam-flex 35mm camera with a wide angle lens, and a typical "speed rail" hard mount—no gyros—on a Mercedes. This model, which could reach a top speed of 235 km/h (146 mph), was only available with a three-speed automatic transmission. Lelouch drove his own car himself and claimed that the top speed achieved was around 200 km/h in the 1.3 km Avenue Foch. Lelouch also claimed during a "making of" documentary that the soundtrack was dubbed with the sound of Lelouch's Ferrari 275GTB, which has the corresponding number of gears and a V12 sound that is quite distinct from that of any V8, including the 6.9 litre V8 of the alleged Mercedes camera car.

On the chosen course there were two people who knew to expect Lelouch. First there was Élie Chouraqui, his first assistant, who was posted with a walkie-talkie in the Rue de Rivoli, behind the archway exiting from the gardens of the Louvre palace, meaning to assist the driver at the only blind junction (archway); Lelouch however revealed that the radios failed, and if Chouraqui had tried to warn him of a pedestrian the message would not have been received. The traffic light at that junction showed green. The other person who knew about his arrival was Lelouch's girlfriend Gunilla Friden. He'd told her he'd arrive within ten minutes at the Sacré-Cœur and asked her to appear upon his arrival.

== DVD release ==
In 2003, documentary filmmaker Richard Symons contacted Claude Lelouch and after six months of arduous talks, persuaded him the film should be restored from its original 35 mm negative and re-released on DVD. Symons' company Spirit Level Film now distributes the DVD worldwide.

== Route ==
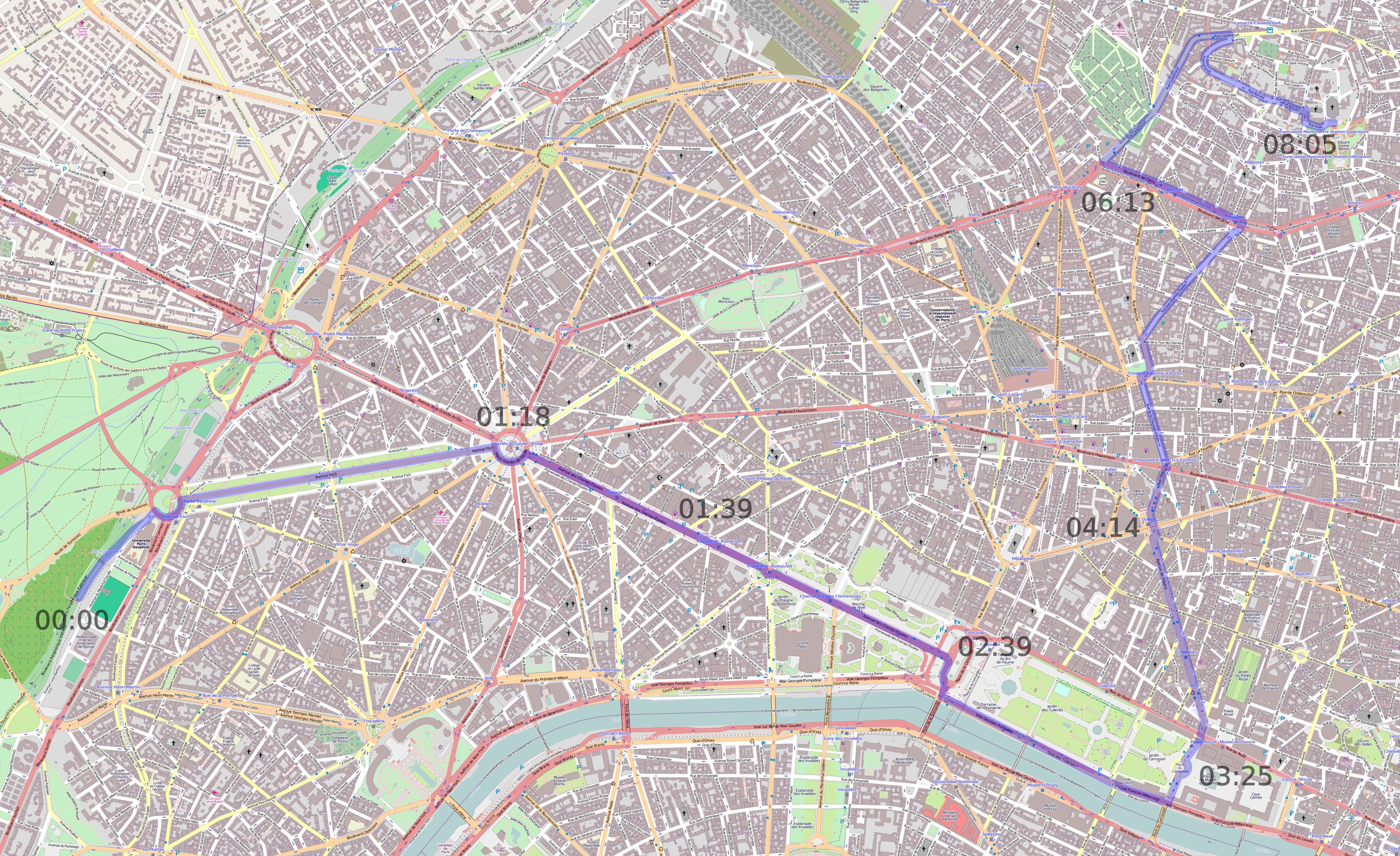
Route on a map

The route was as follows: Bd Périphérique (exits at Porte Dauphine) · Av Foch · Pl Charles de Gaulle · Av des Champs-Elysées · Pl de la Concorde · Quai des Tuileries · Pl du Carrousel · R de Rohan · Av de l'Opéra · Pl de l'Opéra · Fromental Halévy · R de la Chausée d'Antin · Pl d'Estienne d'Orves · R Blanche · R Pigalle · Pl Pigalle · Bd de Clichy · (aborted turn at R Lepic) · R Caulaincourt · Av Junot · Pl Marcel Aymé · R Norvins · Pl du Tertre · R Ste-Eleuthère · R Azais · Pl du Parvis du Sacré Cœur.

The route measures 10.597 km long, which indicates an average speed of approximately 80 km/h (50 mph).

| time | distance (m) | leg dist (m) | leg time (s) | m/s | km/h | mph |
|---|---|---|---|---|---|---|
| 00:10 | 0 | | | | | |
| 00:27 | 457 | 457 | 17 | 27 | 97 | 60 |
| 00:37 | 631 | 174 | 10 | 17 | 63 | 39 |
| 01:16 | 1954 | 1323 | 39 | 34 | 122 | 76 |
| 01:25 | 2190 | 236 | 9 | 26 | 94 | 59 |
| 02:27 | 4117 | 1927 | 62 | 31 | 112 | 70 |
| 02:40 | 4441 | 324 | 13 | 25 | 90 | 56 |
| 03:19 | 5462 | 1021 | 39 | 26 | 94 | 59 |
| 03:36 | 5791 | 329 | 17 | 19 | 70 | 44 |
| 04:08 | 6632 | 841 | 32 | 26 | 95 | 59 |
| 04:26 | 6984 | 352 | 18 | 20 | 70 | 43 |
| 04:45 | 7357 | 373 | 19 | 20 | 71 | 44 |
| 04:52 | 7401 | 44 | 7 | 6 | 23 | 14 |
| 05:15 | 7836 | 435 | 23 | 19 | 68 | 43 |
| 05:19 | 7863 | 27 | 4 | 7 | 24 | 15 |
| 05:38 | 8159 | 296 | 19 | 16 | 56 | 35 |
| 05:48 | 8301 | 142 | 10 | 14 | 51 | 32 |
| 05:57 | 8416 | 115 | 9 | 13 | 46 | 29 |
| 06:24 | 8887 | 471 | 27 | 17 | 63 | 39 |
| 07:04 | 9714 | 827 | 40 | 21 | 74 | 47 |
| 07:48 | 10406 | 692 | 44 | 16 | 57 | 35 |
| 08:07 | 10597 | 191 | 19 | 10 | 36 | 23 |
| total: | 10597 | | 477 | 22,2 | 80,0 | 50,0 |

== Criticism ==
Comments attributed to Lelouch indicate that he acknowledges the public's "moral outrage" over his method of shooting this film. He also states that he was prepared to take the risks in making the film, but that he was also ready to drop it if he came across any unexpected risk (pedestrian, obstacle, etc.).

== In popular culture ==
The film was an inspiration for Criterion Games' 2001 title Burnout, which would spawn the video game series of the same name.

In 2003, Nissan released a promotional DVD for the 350Z entitled The Run. It featured multiple camera views of a copper coloured 350Z driving through the streets of Prague, ending with a rendezvous with a beautiful woman.

In 2007, the film was used as the music video for Snow Patrol's song "Open Your Eyes".

In late 2009, a short film called The Fast and the Famous, directed by Jeremy Hart, was released on YouTube. The film features Jay Leno behind the wheel of a Mercedes-Benz SLS AMG. During his circuit of Mulholland Drive, Laurel Canyon Boulevard, Sunset Boulevard, Beverly Drive, and Coldwater Canyon Drive, Leno makes several references to Lelouch's classic film.

In 2011, the music video for the song "Savage Night at the Opera" by Canadian band Destroyer off their album Kaputt, pays direct homage to the film, except from the perspective of a woman riding a motorbike.

In 2013, French indie pop band Phoenix used the film as a backdrop for live shows during the song "Love Like a Sunset Part I".

In February 2017, Ford Motor Company in association with Claude Lelouch released a 360 degree view remake of the film using a Ford Mustang. Unlike the original, the 2017 version contains several cut scenes and does not show the entire (original) route of Lelouch's 1976 version.

In 2017, the British motoring show The Grand Tour produced an homage featuring a Bugatti Chiron driving across Turin in the episode "Bah Humbug-atti".

In 2018, series 2 episode 8 ("Escape From Paris") of the Amazon series Patriot featured a drive across Paris with shots taken from a camera mounted low on the front of a car. This appears to be an homage to C'était un rendez-vous. In later scenes it even includes inappropriate engine noise and tyre squeal, just like the original.

Christopher McQuarrie noted on the Empire Film Podcast that the film inspired multiple shots in his 2018 film Mission: Impossible – Fallout.

== Tribute film ==
In 2020 Lelouch filmed a tribute film of the film with assistance from Scuderia Ferrari entitled Le Grand Rendez-vous, this time set in Monaco instead of Paris and starring Monegasque Scuderia driver Charles Leclerc. Filming for the new version took place on the streets of Monte Carlo, featuring Leclerc driving a Ferrari SF90 Stradale. It took place on 24 May, which was to have been the date of the Monaco Grand Prix that had been called off because of the global pandemic as only two major motorsport series had resumed competing as of that date. The film premiered one month later on 13 June.
