= Robert et Robert =

- Directed by: Claude Lelouch
- Written by: Claude Lelouch
- Produced by: Claude Lelouch
- Starring: Charles Denner; Jacques Villeret
- Cinematography: Jacques Lefrançois
- Edited by: Sophie Bhaud; Hugues Darmois (Hachdé)
- Music by: Francis Lai; Jean-Claude Nachon
- Distributed by: AMLF
- Release date: 1978
- Running time: 105 minutes
- Country: France
- Language: French

Robert et Robert is a 1978 film directed by Claude Lelouch.

== Synopsis ==
Two single men apply to a dating agency. To start with, they are intimidated, but come round to the idea. That night, they imagine the meetings that will change their lives forever.

== Starring ==
- Charles Denner : Robert Goldman
- Jacques Villeret : Robert Villiers
- Jean-Claude Brialy : M. Millet
- Francis Perrin : M. Michaud
- Germaine Montero : Goldman's mother
- Régine : Villiers's mother
- Macha Méril : Agathe
- Nella Bielski : Mme Millet
- Patricia Cartier
- Josette Derrenne : Mme Michaud
- Arlette Emmery : Arlette
- Mohamed Zinet : Ali
- Bruno Coquatrix : Himself

== Awards ==
- César Awards 1979 : Best supporting actor for Jacques Villeret
