= Édith et Marcel =

1983 French biographical film

- Directed by: Claude Lelouch
- Screenplay by: Claude Lelouch; Pierre Uytterhoeven; Gilles Durieux
- Produced by: Tania Zazulinsky
- Starring: Évelyne Bouix; Marcel Cerdan Jr.; Jacques Villeret; Francis Huster; Jean-Claude Brialy
- Cinematography: Jean Boffety
- Edited by: Hugues Darmois
- Music by: Francis Lai
- Production companies: Les Films 13; Parafrance Films
- Distributed by: Parafrance Films
- Release date: 13 April 1983 (France)
- Running time: 162 minutes
- Country: France
- Language: French

Édith et Marcel is a 1983 French biographical film directed by Claude Lelouch. The film depicts the passionate romance between singer Édith Piaf and boxer Marcel Cerdan in the late 1940s.

== Plot ==
In 1947, the singer Édith Piaf and the boxer Marcel Cerdan are both at the peak of their respective careers. Their encounter gives birth to a passionate love affair lasting some two years, cut short by Cerdan's death in an air crash. The film presents this historical romance alongside a parallel fictional love story between characters Jacques Barbier and Margot de Villedieu.

== Cast ==
- Évelyne Bouix as Édith Piaf / Margot de Villedieu
- Marcel Cerdan Jr. as Marcel Cerdan
- Jacques Villeret as Jacques Barbier
- Francis Huster as Francis Roman
- Jean-Claude Brialy as Loulou Barrier
- Jean Bouise as Lucien Roupp
- Charles Gérard as Charlot
- Charlotte de Turckheim as Ginou Richet
- Micky Sebastian as Marinette Cerdan
- Maurice Garrel as Monsieur de Villedieu
- Ginette Garcin as Guite
- Philippe Khorsand as Jo Longman
- Jany Gastaldi as Momone
- Candice Patou as Josiane de Villedieu
- Tanya Lopert as Miss Davidson
- Charles Aznavour as himself
- Beata Tyszkiewicz as Madame de Villedieu
- Stéphane Ferrara
- Jean-Pierre Bacri as radio speaker (1939)
- Marc Berman
- Michel Aumont

== Production ==
The film was originally conceived with Patrick Dewaere cast as Marcel Cerdan, but Dewaere died by suicide in July 1982 during pre-production. Claude Lelouch then decided to cast Marcel Cerdan Jr., the boxer's actual son, to portray his father. The film incorporates both original Piaf recordings and new compositions by Francis Lai.

== Reception ==
Édith et Marcel received mixed critical reviews. The film holds a 29% rating on Rotten Tomatoes based on seven reviews. Time Out praised Évelyne Bouix's dual performance but criticized the film's excessive length and sentimental approach.
