= Les Uns et les Autres =

- Directed by: Claude Lelouch
- Written by: Claude Lelouch
- Produced by: Claude Lelouch
- Starring: Robert Hossein; Nicole Garcia; Geraldine Chaplin; Daniel Olbrychski; Jorge Donn; Fanny Ardant; Jacques Villeret; Richard Bohringer; James Caan
- Music by: Michel Legrand; Francis Lai; Pierre Barouh; Jean Yanne; Marc de Loutchek
- Distributed by: Parafrance
- Release date: 27 May 1981 (France)
- Running time: 184 minutes
- Country: France
- Languages: French, German, English, Russian
- Box office: $24.3 million

Les Uns et les Autres (English: The Ones and the Others) is a 1981 French film by Claude Lelouch. The film is a musical epic and it is widely considered as the director's best work, along with Un Homme et une Femme (A Man and a Woman). It won the Technical Grand Prize at the 1981 Cannes Film Festival. In the United States, it was distributed under the name Boléro in reference to Maurice Ravel's orchestral piece, used in the film. The film was very successful in France with 3,234,549 admissions and was the 6th highest-grossing film of the year.

== Plot ==
The film follows four families, with different nationalities (French, German, Russian, and American) but with the same passion for music, from the 1930s to the 1980s. The various story lines cross each other time and again in different places and times, with their own theme scores that evolve as time passes.

In Moscow, 1936, an aspiring dancer Tatiana marries a man, Boris, who will give her a son just before he is killed during World War II. In Berlin, Karl Kremer's success as a pianist is confirmed when he receives praise from Hitler – something which will haunt him throughout his life. In Paris, a young violinist Anne falls in love with a Jewish pianist, Simon Meyer; they marry and produce a son, but they end up on a train bound for a Nazi concentration camp. In New York, Jack Glenn is making his name with his popular jazz band. Twenty years on, their children are reliving their experiences, and Anne Meyer continues her hopeless quest to find the son she was forced to abandon.

The main event in the film is the Second World War, which throws the stories of the four musical families together and mixes their fates. Although all characters are fictional, many of them are loosely based on historical musical icons (Édith Piaf, Josephine Baker, Herbert von Karajan, Glenn Miller, Rudolf Nureyev, etc.) The Boléro dance sequence, by Jorge Donn at the Palais de Chaillot, at the end brings all the threads together.

== Cast ==
- Robert Hossein as Simon Meyer / Robert Prat
- Nicole Garcia as Anne Meyer
- Geraldine Chaplin as Suzanne Glenn / Sarah Glenn
- James Caan as Jack Glenn / Jason Glenn
- Daniel Olbrychski as Karl Kremer
- Jean-Claude Bouttier as Philippe Rouget
- Jorge Donn as Boris Itovitch / Sergei Itovitch
- Rita Poelvoorde as Tatiana Itovitch / Nadia Itovitch
- Macha Méril as Magda Kremer
- Évelyne Bouix as Évelyne / Édith
- Francis Huster as Francis
- Raymond Pellegrin as M. Raymond
- Marthe Villalonga as Édith's grandmother
- Paul Préboist as Édith's grandfather
- Jean-Claude Brialy as Lido's director
- Fanny Ardant as Véronique
- Jacques Villeret as Jacques
- Richard Bohringer as Richard
- Nicole Croisille as herself
- Ginette Garcin as Ginette
- Jean-Pierre Kalfon as Father Antoine
- Geneviève Mnich as Jeanne, Jacques' mother
- Éva Darlan as Eva
- Ernie Garrett as Bobby
- Féodor Atkine as Alexis
- Jean-Claude Bouttier
- Jean-Pierre Castaldi
- Michèle Moretti
- Alexandra Stewart
- Francis Lai
- Barry Primus
- Valérie Quennessen as Francis Huster's girlfriend
- Brigitte Roüan (only in director's cut)
- Sharon Stone as girl in bed with Glenn senior (uncredited)
- Michel Rivard (only in director's cut)

== Release ==
A heavily cut version was released in the United States with the title Bolero: Dance of Life.
