= Love Is a Funny Thing =

- Directed by: Claude Lelouch
- Written by: Claude Lelouch; Pierre Uytterhoeven
- Produced by: Georges Dancigers; Alexandre Mnouchkine
- Starring: Jean-Paul Belmondo; Annie Girardot
- Cinematography: Jean Collomb
- Edited by: Claude Barrois; Jack Harris
- Music by: Francis Lai
- Distributed by: Les Films 13
- Release date: 1969
- Running time: 110 minutes
- Country: France
- Language: French
- Box office: 1,391,524 admissions (France)

Love Is a Funny Thing (French: Un homme qui me plaît, a.k.a. A Man I Like) is a 1969 French romantic drama film directed by Claude Lelouch.

== Plot ==
An accidental meeting occurs in the United States between an actress and a composer, both French. Leaving her husband and child in Paris, cinema actress Françoise is driven to the United States, waiting for her big break. Composer Henri, who revels in being a compulsive liar and is married to an Italian woman, is only in New York to record film music. They are both waiting to go to Los Angeles. There, they become lovers. The next day, Henri decides to delay his return for 24 hours to take Françoise to Las Vegas. As they part to return to their spouses, Henri tells Françoise that before they decide to live together they should meet again in Nice (because it is halfway between Paris and Rome). Françoise breaks up with her husband and goes to Nice to meet Henri at the appointed time. She waits for him at the Nice airport, but he ultimately does not show up.

== Cast ==
- Jean-Paul Belmondo as Henri
- Annie Girardot as Françoise
- Kaz Garas as Paul
- Peter Bergman as Director
- Farrah Fawcett as Patricia
- Foster Hood as Indian
- Bill Quinn as Passenger
- Timothy Blake as The Dominos
- Jerry Cipperly as Waiter in Cafe
- Maria Pia Conte as Henri's Wife
- Arturo Dominici as Customs Officer
- Sweet Emma Barrett as Herself
- Marcel Bozzuffi as Françoise's Husband

== Production ==
Parts of the film were shot at Monument Valley and the Goulding Trading Post in Utah.
