= Happy New Year (1973 film) =

- Directed by: Claude Lelouch
- Screenplay by: Pierre Uytterhoeven; Claude Lelouch
- Story by: Claude Lelouch
- Starring: Lino Ventura; Françoise Fabian; Charles Gérard; André Falcon
- Cinematography: Claude Lelouch
- Edited by: Georges Klotz
- Music by: Francis Lai
- Production companies: Les Films 13; Rizzoli Film
- Distributed by: Les Films 13 (Paris)
- Release dates: 13 April 1973 (France); 14 September 1973 (Italy)
- Running time: 115 minutes
- Countries: France; Italy
- Language: French
- Budget: 9.5 million francs

Happy New Year (French: La bonne année) is a 1973 romance and comedy drama film directed by Claude Lelouch. It tells the story of a gangster who organises a successful heist but is himself caught and jailed. Released early, he not only recoups his share of the takings but also regains his girlfriend. The film is edited to present a nonlinear narrative, with the beginning and ending of the film showing the present-day in black-and-white, and the center of the film showing a flashback of the events in color.

The film is a French and Italian co-production between the Paris-based Les Films 13 and Rizzoli Film. It performed well in the French box office and earned both Ventura and Fabian the David di Donatello for Best Acting.

== Plot ==
In 1973, a criminal named Simon is granted early release from prison under a New Year's amnesty after serving six years of a ten-year sentence for robbery. He returns to his apartment, only to discover that another man has made himself comfortable there. Wishing to avoid a confrontation, Simon leaves the apartment without being seen by the intruder. He spends New Year's Eve at his favorite bar, Michou—where French singer Mireille Mathieu is also celebrating—and attempts to call his old friend Charlot. At this point, the film's narrative shifts to the past, six years earlier.

The two criminals, Simon and Charlot, travel by train to Cannes and check into the luxurious Carlton Hotel on the beachfront promenade. From the window of their hotel room, Charlot observes a nearby Van Cleef & Arpels jewelry store that Simon has selected as the target for their heist. Charlot notes that the shop is heavily fortified, featuring bulletproof glass display windows, armored doors, pervasive alarm systems, and a direct line to police headquarters. He concludes that the store is impossible to crack.

Simon disagrees. He applies a self-adhesive mask to his face and hair, rendering himself unrecognizable and giving him the appearance of an elderly man. In this disguise, he enters the jewelry store as a customer, speaks with an altered voice, and asks the manager to show him some jewelry. He claims he wants to buy a gift for his 68-year-old sister, who is hospitalized in a clinic in Nice with a rapidly deteriorating health condition. He selects an expensive brooch and pays for it with a check.

Simon and Charlot closely observe and document the number of employees working in the jewelry store, their morning arrival and step-by-step opening routines, the timing and duration of their lunch breaks, and the store's closing time. Stopwatch in hand, the two thieves also rehearse their getaway for after the robbery, planning to drive to the harbor and take a boat to Sanremo. Donning his disguise once again, Simon enters the jewelry store for a second time, stating that his sister needs a bracelet to complement the brooch, which he then purchases.

Adjacent to the jewelry store is an antique shop, and Simon takes a romantic interest in its owner, Françoise. At the restaurant Félix, he discovers an original Louis XVI side table, which he purchases from the restaurant's owner, Madame Félix, at a high price. He brings the table to Françoise's antique shop and asks her to take it on consignment to resell. Françoise agrees to the arrangement, and that evening, the two dine together at the restaurant Félix. During the dinner, it is revealed that Simon bought the table from Madame Félix at a significantly lower price than he had claimed to Françoise, and that Françoise also intends to sell it at a higher price than she had agreed upon with Simon. After their evening together, Simon and Françoise part ways without him having grown significantly closer to her.

Françoise invites Simon and Charlot to a Christmas dinner, which is also attended by four of her friends. One of the guests repeatedly asks Simon if he has seen various well-known films, which he denies every time. Following this public humiliation, Simon and Charlot leave the table. An angered Françoise kicks all of her remaining guests out. She calls Simon, telling him she should have celebrated Christmas with him alone. He returns to her, and they become romantically involved.

Simon visits the jewelry store a third time in his mask, telling the manager he wishes to buy his sister one final gift, but it must be exceptionally beautiful. He claims that the doctors have little hope for her and doubt she will survive the coming night. The jeweler presents him with three exquisite necklaces. Unable to decide, Simon asks for permission to photograph the jewelry for his sister. After some hesitation, the jeweler agrees, and Charlot photographs the necklaces. Simon leaves to show the pictures to his sister so she can make her choice. The manager reminds him that he must return exactly by the store's closing time at 7:30 PM if he wants to take the necklace that same day.

Simon arrives shortly after closing time, but earnestly begs the manager to make an exception for him. The manager finally yields; Simon pays half a million francs in cash for the selected necklace and receives it. While the jeweler is distracted, Charlot slips into the store unnoticed and hides. As the jeweler attempts to put the cash into the safe, Charlot holds him at gunpoint and forces him to empty all the jewelry from the safe into his bag. Charlot successfully escapes with the loot. However, when Simon attempts to leave the store, the exit door is locked because the vault door and the security vestibule had been open for more than two minutes. The police arrive, and Simon is arrested.

During Simon's years in prison, Françoise visits him regularly. She moves into his apartment and renovates it, but simultaneously keeps an Italian lover. The film then shifts back to the present day.

Following his release from prison, Simon reunites with his accomplice Charlot on New Year's Eve. The two embrace. Charlot had successfully escaped with the stolen jewels and avoided capture; having fenced the jewelry, he proudly presents Simon with a suitcase full of banknotes. Simon intends to emigrate to Brazil, but Charlot argues that this would be unfair to Françoise. While waiting for his flight at the airport, Simon ultimately decides to call her. She is sleepy in bed, with her Italian lover beside her. She asks Simon if he has broken out of prison and is told, "Amnesty." Realizing that Françoise intends to return to Simon, her lover leaves the apartment. She cleans up the place and prepares breakfast for herself and Simon. Simon arrives in a taxi and sits across from her in a long silence. She justifies her actions by saying, "It was just a way to get by. My way of waiting for you. Just living." After a while, he replies, "Come, the coffee is getting cold."

== Cast ==
Cast adapted from French Thrillers of the 1970s: Volume 1, Crime Films (2026).

- Lino Ventura as Simon
- Françoise Fabian as Françoise
- Charles Gérard as Charlot
- André Falcon as jewler
- Lilo as Madame Félix
- Claude Mann as the intellectual
- Frédéric de Pasquale as Françoise's Paraisian lover
- Gérard Sire as the prison warden
- Silvano Tranquilli as Françoise's Italian lover
- Élie Chouraqui as the inmate who escapes
- Rémy Julienne as the taxi driver
- Mireille Mathieu as herself

== Production ==
The film was a co-production between France and Italy between two film production companies: the Paris based Les Films 13 and the Rome based Rizzoli Film. Rizzoli Film provided 20 percent of the film's 9.5 million franc budget. Much of the film was financed by advertising, particularly for Van Cleef & Arpels.

The film was shot in January 1973.

== Release and reception ==
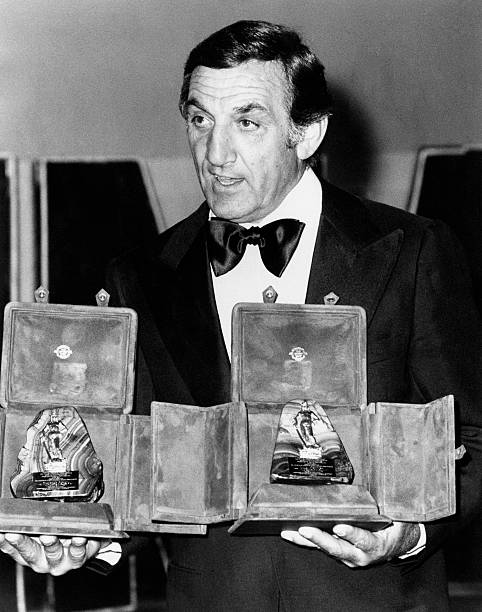
Ventura with the two David di Donatello awards he and Françoise Fabian won for Happy New Year.

Happy New Year was released in France on April 13, 1973. It sold over 1.373 million tickets and was the top of the French box office for three weeks. It was later released in Italy on September 14, 1973 and received release in English territories such as New York on December 12, 1973 by AVCO Embassy and London, England on July 18, 1974. Lino Ventura and Françoise Fabian won prizes for best actor and actress at the San Sebastián International Film Festival as well as the David di Donatello in Italy. In their book French Thrillers of the 1970s: Volume 1, Crime Films (2026), authors Roberto Curti and Frank Lafond said the film was released "to good critical success".

The film was remade as Happy New Year (1987), directed by John G. Avildsen and starring Peter Falk, Charles Durning and Tom Courtenay. Lelouch commented on the remake, saying that it could have been good but people at Columbia Pictures suppressed the flashbacks and that audiences would grow bored if the story was told chronologically. The latter film was nominated for an Academy Award for best make-up, but performed poorly in the box office.
