= Live for Life =

Live for Life (Vivre pour vivre)
- original film poster
- Directed by: Claude Lelouch
- Written by: Claude Lelouch; Pierre Uytterhoeven
- Produced by: Georges Dancigers; Alexandre Mnouchkine
- Starring: Yves Montand; Candice Bergen; Annie Girardot
- Cinematography: Patrice Pouget
- Edited by: Claude Barrois: Title : The Grand Moments; Director : Claude Lelouch; Photography : Jean Collomb; Producers : Films 13, Films de la Pléiade; Scenery : Robert Luchaire; Format : 2,35:1 (Franscope) - Mono - 35 mm; Release date : 1965 Claude Lelouch
- Music by: Francis Lai
- Distributed by: United Artists
- Release date: 1967
- Running time: 130 minutes
- Country: France
- Language: French
- Box office: $400,000 (US)

Live for Life (French: Vivre pour vivre) is a 1967 French film directed by Claude Lelouch starring Yves Montand, Candice Bergen and Annie Girardot. The film won the Golden Globe for Best Foreign Language Film and was nominated for the Academy Award for Best Foreign Language Film. The film had a total of 2,936,035 admissions in France and was the 7th highest-grossing film of the year.

== Plot ==
Robert Colomb (Yves Montand) is a famous TV newscaster, married to Catherine (Annie Girardot), but continually unfaithful to her. Then he meets, and becomes fascinated with Candice (Candice Bergen). He takes her along on an assignment in Kenya and later establishes an "arrangement" with her in Amsterdam.

He is then assigned to Vietnam, tells Candice their affair is over and discovers that is more than acceptable to her as she is tired of him. Returning from a Vietnamese prison, he decides to return to Catherine, but discovers she has made a new life for herself.

== Cast ==
- Yves Montand as Robert Colomb
- Candice Bergen as Candice
- Annie Girardot as Catherine Colomb
- Irène Tunc as Mireille
- Anouk Ferjac as Jacqueline
- Uta Taeger as Lucie/maid
- Jean Collomb as Waiter
- Michel Parbot as Michel
- Amidou as Photographer
- Jacques Portet as Candice's friend/photographer

== See also ==
- List of submissions to the 40th Academy Awards for Best Foreign Language Film
- List of French submissions for the Academy Award for Best Foreign Language Film
