= A Thousand Billion Dollars =

- Theatrical release poster
- Directed by: Henri Verneuil
- Written by: Henri Verneuil
- Produced by: Henri Verneuil
- Cinematography: Jean-Louis Picavet
- Edited by: Pierre Gillette
- Music by: Philippe Sarde
- Distributed by: AMLF
- Release date: 10 February 1982
- Running time: 132 minutes
- Country: France
- Language: French
- Box office: $8.9 million

A Thousand Billion Dollars (French: Mille milliards de dollars) is a 1982 French thriller film directed by Henri Verneuil and starring Patrick Dewaere. It tells the story of a young French journalist who discovers how an American company is using assassinations and other criminal methods to take over French industries.

The film was released in France on 10 February 1982. It recorded 1,190,673 admissions in its domestic market.

== Cast ==
- Patrick Dewaere as Paul Kerjean
- Michel Auclair as Michel Saint-Claude
- Caroline Cellier as Hélène Kerjean
- Charles Denner as Walter
- Anny Duperey as Laura Weber
- Jeanne Moreau as Mme Benoît-Lambert
- Mel Ferrer as Cornelius A. Woeagen
- Fernand Ledoux as Guérande
- Jean Mercure as Holstein
- Jean-Pierre Kalfon as the informant
- Jean-Laurent Cochet as Hartmann
- André Falcon as Pierre Bayen
- Jacques Maury as Jack Sleiter
- Jacqueline Doyen as Arlène Robert
- Édith Scob as Madame Bronsky
- Claude Marcault as Kerjean's secretary
