= Tanya Lopert =

French actress

- Born: June 19, 1942 (age 83); New York City, United States
- Occupation: Actress
- Years active: 1961–present
- Spouse: Jean-Louis Livi (divorced)

Tanya Lopert (born 19 June 1942 in New York City) is a French actress and the daughter of Ilya Lopert. She appeared in more than seventy films since 1961.

== Personal life ==
She was formerly married to producer Jean-Louis Livi.

== Selected filmography ==
Film
Year	Title	Role	Notes
1955	Summertime	Teenage girl	Uncredited
1961	Something Wild	Shopgirl	
1962	My Son, the Hero	Licina	
1964	Devil of the Desert Against the Son of Hercules		
1964	Une souris chez les hommes	Lucky's friend	
1965	The Vampire of Düsseldorf	Une fille	
1965	What's New Pussycat?	Miss Lewis	
1965	The Sleeping Car Murders	M^{me} Garaudy	
1966	Un monde nouveau	Mary	
1966	Navajo Joe	Maria	
1968	Les Gauloises bleues		
1969	The Devil by the Tail	Cookie	
1969	Listen, Let's Make Love	Flavia	
1969	Fellini Satyricon	Emperor	
1969	Les Femmes	Louise	
1970	Lettera aperta a un giornale della sera		
1977	Providence	Miss Lister	
1981	Tales of Ordinary Madness	Vicky	
1983	The Story of Piera	Elide	
1983	Édith et Marcel	English teacher	
1984	P'tit Con	Psychiatrist	
1984	Viva la vie	Julia	
1986	A Man and a Woman: 20 Years Later	Herself	
1988	A Few Days with Me	Madame Maillotte	
1991	The Sky Above Paris	Florist	
2001	That Love	Ambassador's wife	
2004	Changing Times	Rachel Meyer	
2014	In the Name of My Daughter	Lydie	
