= La Belle Histoire =

- Original French theatrical poster
- Directed by: Claude Lelouch
- Written by: Claude Lelouch (scenario, dialogue); Maryline Dupoux (additional dialogue)
- Starring: Gérard Lanvin; Béatrice Dalle; Vincent Lindon; Isabelle Nanty; Patrick Chesnais; Anémone; Marie-Sophie L. Gérard Darmon; Jean-Claude Dreyfus
- Cinematography: Jean-Yves Le Mener
- Edited by: Hélène de Luze
- Music by: Francis Lai; Philippe Servain
- Distributed by: AFMD/Les Films 13
- Release date: 18 March 1992 (France)
- Running time: 210 min.
- Language: French
- Box office: $4.3 million

La Belle Histoire (1992) is a French film directed by Claude Lelouch, featuring Gérard Lanvin and Béatrice Dalle.

== Synopsis ==
A film with an emphasis on visuals and music, the plot concerns characters who meet in present time, mainly the male gypsy Jesus, and the female thief and con-artist Odona, who share parallel experiences from lives 2000 years in the past. These stories are juxtaposed.

== Cast ==
- Gérard Lanvin : Jésus-Christ
- Béatrice Dalle : Odona
- Vincent Lindon : Simon Choulel
- Marie-Sophie L. : Marie
- Patrick Chesnais : Pierre Lhermitte
- Anémone : Madame Desjardins
- Isabelle Nanty : Isabelle
- Jean Benguigui : Doga
- Paul Préboist : The knit teacher
- Élie Chouraqui : Pierre's associate
- Amina Annabi : Jesus's sister
- François Perrot : Marie's uncle
- Jean-Michel Dupuis : Professor
- Gérard Darmon : The biker
- Amidou : The shepherd
- Pierre Vernier : The director
- Jean-Claude Dreyfus : The inspector
- Jacques Gamblin : The young cop
- Patrick Edlinger : Himself
- Patrice Laffont : Himself
- Marie Sara : Herself
- Hubert Reeves : Himself
- Laurent Weil : Himself

== Production ==
Filming took place in Nîmes.

== Events ==
Prior to the film's release, in February 1992 a 70 mm copy of the film was projected onto a 300 m wide screen mounted on the Palais des Congrès in Paris.

== See also ==
- Cinema of France
