= Mado (film) =

- Theatrical release poster
- Directed by: Claude Sautet
- Written by: Claude Néron; Claude Sautet
- Starring: Michel Piccoli; Ottavia Piccolo
- Cinematography: Jean Boffety
- Edited by: Jacqueline Thiédot
- Music by: Philippe Sarde
- Distributed by: Les Films La Boëtie
- Release date: 27 October 1976
- Running time: 135 minutes
- Country: France
- Language: French

Mado is a 1976 French drama film directed by Claude Sautet.

== Cast ==
- Michel Piccoli : Simon Léotard
- Ottavia Piccolo : Mado
- Jacques Dutronc : Pierre
- Charles Denner : Reynald Manecca
- Romy Schneider : Hélène
- Julien Guiomar : Lépidon
- Claude Dauphin : Vaudable
- Michel Aumont : Aimé Barachet
- Jean Bouise : André
- André Falcon : Mathelin
- Bernard Fresson : Julien
- Benoît Allemane : Antoine
- Nathalie Baye : Catherine
- Daniel Russo : Roger
- Dominique Zardi : Crovetto
- Denise Filiatrault : Lucienne
- Nicolas Vogel : Maxime
