= The Guardian Angel (1978 film) =

- French: L'Ange gardien
- Directed by: Jacques Fournier
- Written by: Jacques Fournier
- Produced by: Pierre Grunstein
- Starring: Margaret Trudeau; André Falcon; Francis Lemaire
- Cinematography: Yves Pouffary
- Edited by: Frédéric de Chateaubriant
- Music by: Marcel Napoleoni
- Production companies: Les Films Prospec Inc. Promédi Film
- Release date: December 21, 1978
- Running time: 98 minutes
- Countries: Canada; France
- Language: French

The Guardian Angel (French: L'Ange gardien) is a Canadian-French coproduced romantic comedy film, directed by Jacques Fournier and released in 1978. The film was most noted for casting Margaret Trudeau, soon after her separation from Canadian Prime Minister Pierre Trudeau, in a starring role; it was actually her second performance in a film, but the first to premiere commercially.

The film centres on Annie (Trudeau), the Canadian wife of wealthy businessman André Roussel (André Falcon), who is sent by her husband on a vacation in the French Riviera. Her husband sends private detective Aldo (Francis Lemaire) to follow her as he suspects her of infidelity; however, Annie and Aldo themselves begin a romantic relationship with each other.

The film was not well received by critics, with many focusing in particular on Trudeau's acting skills. As Trudeau was not fluent in French, the film was written so that she spoke her lines in English and was then overdubbed by another actress. Even Peter Towe, Canada's ambassador to the United States, was quoted by the press as criticizing Trudeau's performance skills, although he later claimed to have been misquoted and expressed his "tremendous sympathy for anyone trying two new things—acting and speaking French."
