= André Falcon =

French actor

- Born: 28 November 1924; Lyon, France
- Died: 22 July 2009 (aged 84); Paris, France
- Occupation: Actor
- Years active: 1954–2008

André Falcon

André Falcon (28 November 1924 – 22 July 2009) was a French film actor. He appeared in more than one hundred films from 1954 to 2008.

== Filmography ==
Film
Year	Title	Role	Notes
1954	The Count of Bragelonne	Louis XIV	
1965	The Two Orphans	Docteur Hébert	
1966	Is Paris Burning?	Member of Resistance council	Uncredited
1967	Le grand dadais	L'avocat	
1968	Stolen Kisses	Monsieur Blady	
1969	Tout peut arriver	Jean	
1970	The Confession		
1971	L'homme de désir	Le commissaire de police	
1971	Without Apparent Motive	Mayor	
1971	Un peu de soleil dans l'eau froide	Florent	
1972	L'aventure, c'est l'aventure	L'ambassadeur	
1972	Les Rois maudits	Enguerrand de Marigny	2 episodes
1972	State of Siege	Deputy Fabbri	
1973	Escape to Nowhere	Le commissaire de police	
1973	A Full Day's Work	M. Patou	
1973	Night Flight from Moscow	French Diplomat	
1973	Happy New Year	Le bijoutier	
1973	Ras le bol	Le commandant Stella	
1973	Il n'y a pas de fumée sans feu	Boussard	
1973	A Slightly Pregnant Man	Scipion Lemeu	
1973	The Mad Adventures of Rabbi Jacob	Le ministre	
1974	Nada	The Minister	
1974	And Now My Love	Lawyer	
1974	Icy Breasts	Eric Carner	
1974	Borsalino & Co.	Inspector Cazenave	
1974	Only the Wind Knows the Answer	Notar Ribeyrolles	Uncredited
1975	Maître Pygmalion		
1975	Le faux-cul	Freaumont	
1976	Docteur Françoise Gailland	Jean Rimevale	
1976	Le bon et les méchants		
1976	The Margin	Antonin Pons	
1976	Mado	Mathelin	
1977	Le Gang	La bijoutier	
1977	Un tueur, un flic, ainsi soit-il...	Vergerete chef de la police	
1977	The French Woman	Paul	
1977	Sorcerer	Guillot	
1977	Man in a Hurry	L'expert	
1978	Ne pleure pas	M. Lafarge	
1978	Blindfolded Eyes	Abogado	
1978	The Guardian Angel (L'Ange gardien)	André Roussel	
1979	I as in Icarus	Darsell	Uncredited
1980	Pile ou face	Lampertuis	
1980	Trois hommes à abattre	Jacques Mouzon	
1980-1989	Julien Fontanes, magistrat	The Cardonnois	19 episodes
1981	Dickie-roi	Simon Véry	4 episodes
1982	A Thousand Billion Dollars	Pierre Bayen, le rédacteur en chef	
1986	27 horas	Tío de Jon	
1987	Duo solo	Le père de Marie	
1995	Stories from the Kronen	Abuelo de Carlos	
1996	Capitaine Conan	Col. Voirin	
1996	Familia	Martin	
2004	Les parisiens	Le joaillier	
2005	Le courage d'aimer	Le directeur de la bijouterie	
