= Chance or Coincidence =

- Directed by: Claude Lelouch
- Written by: Claude Lelouch
- Produced by: André Picard; Marie-Christine Lezzi; Suzanne Dussault; Gabriela Chavira-Gélin; Sule Soysal; Faruk Aksoy
- Starring: Alessandra Martines; Pierre Arditi; Marc Hollogne; Laurent Hilaire; Geoffrey Holder
- Cinematography: Pierre-William Glenn
- Edited by: Hélène de Luze
- Music by: Claude Bolling; Francis Lai
- Distributed by: Les films 13
- Release dates: 7 September 1998 (Canada); 18 November 1998 (France); 6 August 1999 (UK)
- Running time: 120 minutes
- Countries: Canada; France
- Languages: English, Italian, French

Hasards ou coïncidences is a French film directed by Claude Lelouch, released in 1998.

== Starring ==
- Alessandra Martines : Myriam Lini
- Pierre Arditi : Pierre Turi
- Marc Hollogne : Marc Deschamps
- Véronique Moreau : Catherine Desvilles
- Patrick Labbé : Michel Bonhomme
- Laurent Hilaire : Laurent
- Geoffrey Holder : Gerry
- Charles Gérard : L'homme sur le bateau
- David La Haye : Le voleur

== Awards ==
- Nominated for César Award for Best Music Written for a Film
- Best Actress at Chicago Film Festival for Alessandra Martines
