= Life Love Death =

- Directed by: Claude Lelouch
- Written by: Claude Lelouch; Pierre Uytterhoeven
- Produced by: Claude Lelouch; Alexandre Mnouchkine; Georges Dancigers
- Starring: Amidou; Caroline Cellier; Janine Magnan
- Cinematography: Jean Collomb
- Edited by: Claude Barrois
- Music by: Francis Lai
- Distributed by: Les Films 13; Les Artistes Associés
- Release date: 1968
- Running time: 115 minutes
- Country: France
- Language: French
- Box office: $9.8 million

La Vie, l’Amour, la Mort is a film directed by Claude Lelouch in 1968 (released in France in 1969).

== Synopsis ==
François Toledo, a married businessman and father, falls head-over-heels in love with Janine, a colleague. However, after three dates, he feels dishonoured when he has impotence. In frustration, he strangles some prostitutes before being arrested. He is tried and convicted, and sentenced to death on the guillotine.

== Starring ==
- Amidou : François Toledo
- Caroline Cellier : Caroline
- Janine Magnan : Janine
- Marcel Bozzuffi
- Pierre Zimmer
- Pierre Collet
- "El Cordobés"
- Annie Girardot
- Jacques Henry
- Robert Hossein
- Catherine Samie : Julie

== Awards ==
- Best Actor at the Rio Festival for Amidou
