= Jean-Laurent Cochet =

French actor (1935–2020)

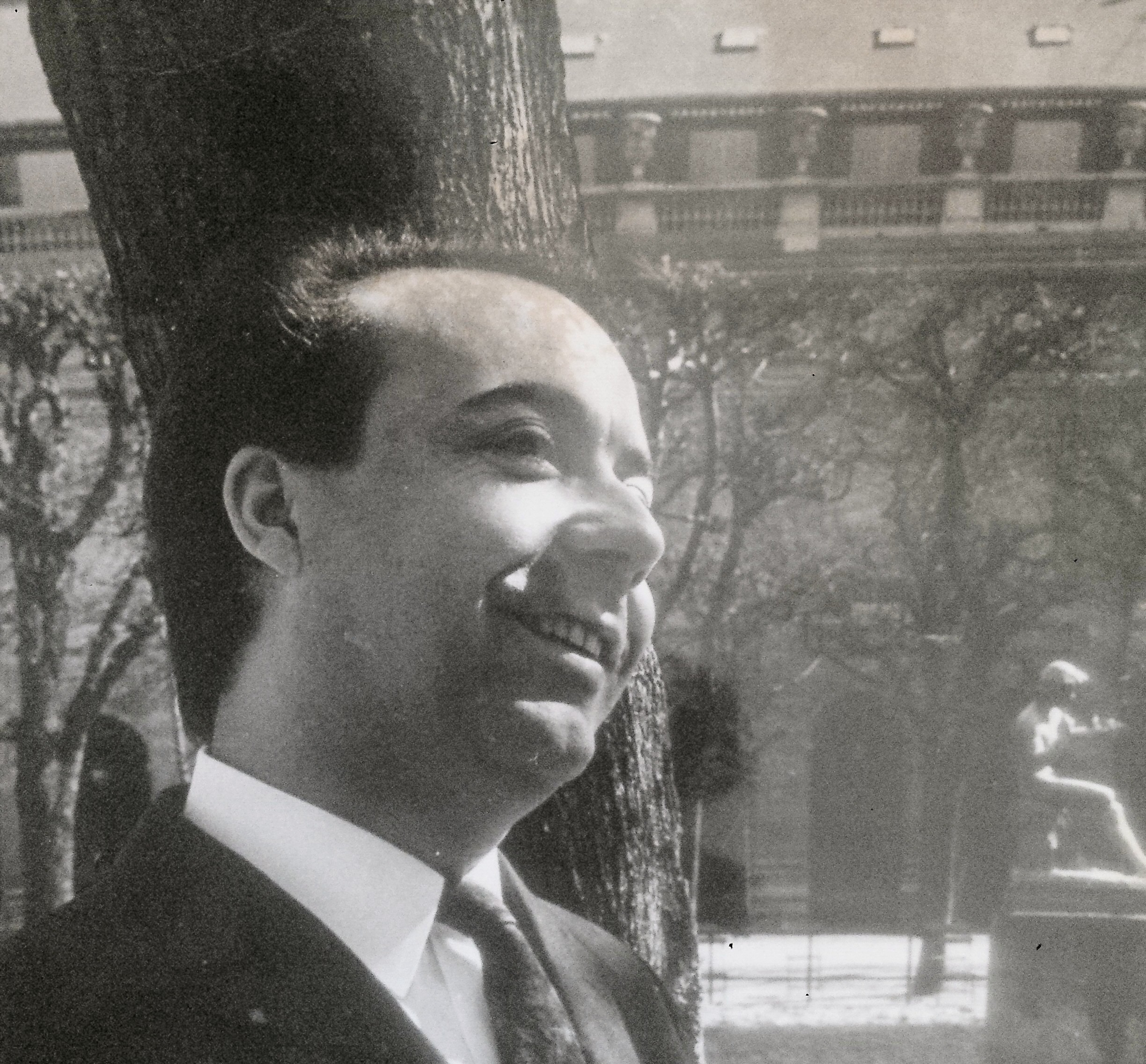
- Born: 28 January 1935; Romainville, France
- Died: 7 April 2020 (aged 85); Paris, France
- Occupations: actor, theater director, acting coach

Jean-Laurent Cochet (French: [ʒɑ̃ loʁɑ̃ kɔʃɛ]; 28 January 1935 – 7 April 2020) was a French theater director, actor and acting coach.

== Biography ==
He was best known for starring in movies such as A Thousand Billion Dollars and Fort Saganne. He was an important teacher for acting. Hundreds of his students have succeeded in theater and cinema: Gérard Depardieu, Richard Berry, Claude Jade, Isabelle Huppert, Daniel Auteuil, Emmanuelle Béart, Carole Bouquet, Fabrice Luchini, Raphaël Quenard, etc. On 7 April 2020, he died from COVID-19 during the pandemic.

== Filmography ==
Year	Title	Role	Notes
1982	A Thousand Billion Dollars	Hartmann	
1984	Fort Saganne	Bertozza	
2004	Edward & Lulu	Le Notaire	

== Honors ==
- 2006 Legion of Honour
- 2012 Ordre des Arts et des Lettres

== Awards ==
- 1975 : Trophée Béatrix Dussane
- 1984 Prix du Brigadier
