= Un homme libre (1973 film) =

1973 film

Un homme libre (released in English as A Free Man) is a 1973 feature film written by Roberto Muller and Pierre Uytterhoeven and directed by Roberto Muller himself and starring French singer Gilbert Bécaud and actress Olga Georges-Picot.

== Synopsis ==
Henri Lefèvre (Gilbert Bécaud) abandoned by his wife Nicole (Olga Georges-Picot) pours all his affection for his daughter (Sophie Bunoust-Roquère). He also falls in love with an American (played by Pam Huntington) which creates tensions between father and daughter as she is jealous of his father's new love interest.

== Cast ==
- Gilbert Bécaud as Henri Lefèvre
- Olga Georges-Picot as Nicole Lefèvre
- Sophie Bunoust-Roquère as Henri Lefèvre's daughter
- Pam Huntington as "L'Américaine"
- Clotilde Joano as the antiquarian
- Christiane Minazzoli as sales girl
- Charles Gérard as Félix
- Michel Duplaix as Michel Duplaix
