= Catherine Allégret =

French actress

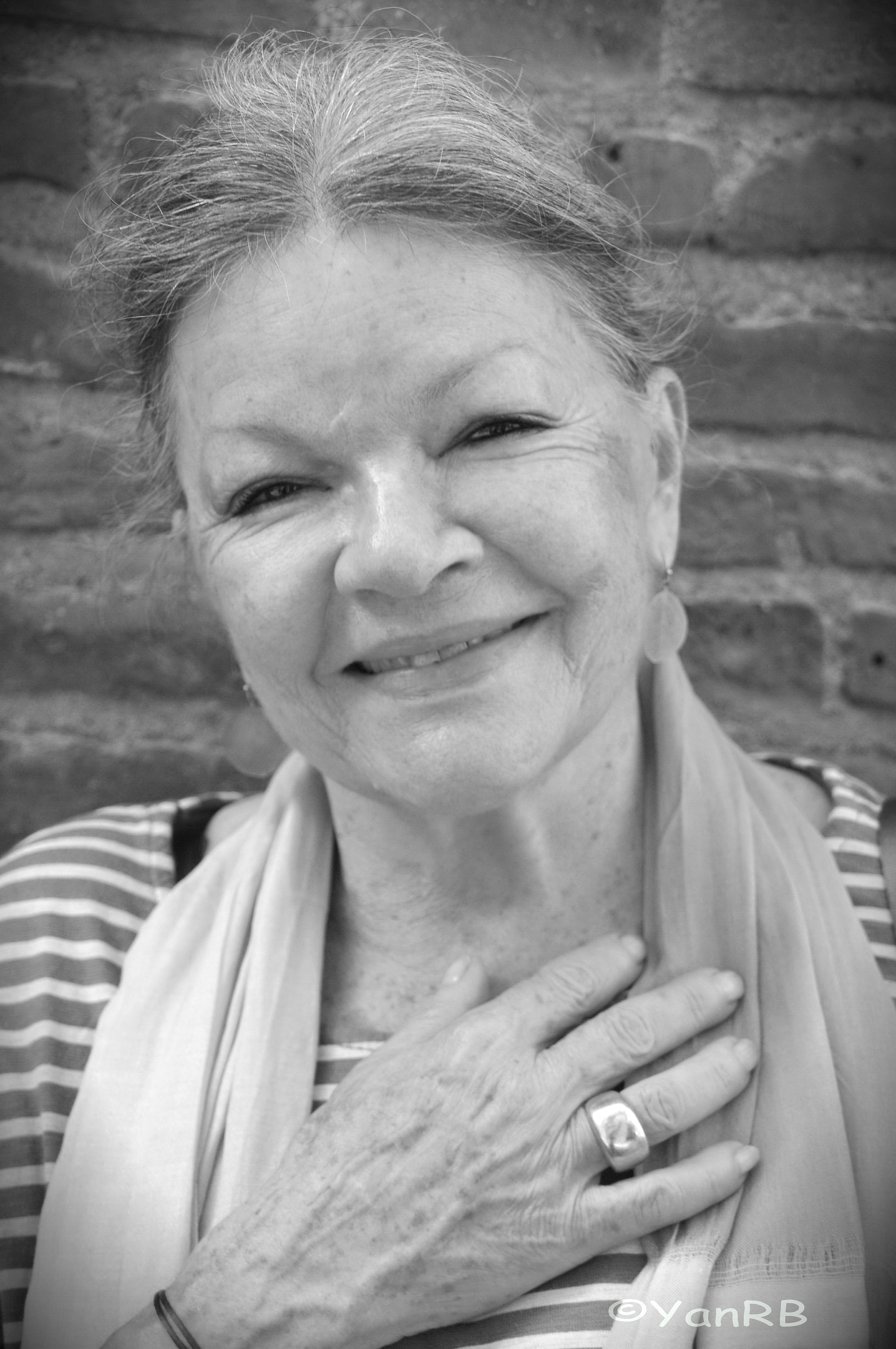
- Born: 16 April 1946 (age 80); Neuilly-sur-Seine, France
- Occupations: Actress, author
- Years active: 1964–present
- Spouses: Jean-Pierre Castaldi; Maurice Vaudaux
- Children: 2, including Benjamin Castaldi
- Parents: Yves Allégret (father); Simone Signoret (mother)

Catherine Allégret (born 16 April 1946) is a French actress. She is the daughter of Simone Signoret and Yves Allégret.

In 2007, she portrayed Édith Piaf's neglectful grandmother Louise Gassion in Olivier Dahan's biopic La Vie En Rose (La Môme in French).

== Personal life ==
Allégret has been married twice. Her first marriage was to Jean-Pierre Castaldi, with whom she has a son, Benjamin Castaldi. Her second husband is Maurice Vaudaux, with whom she has a daughter, Clémentine.

In 2004, Allégret published a memoir titled World Upside Down (Un monde à l'envers) in which she wrote that she was sexually abused by her stepfather Yves Montand for many years from the age of 5.

== Selected filmography ==
- Lady L (1965)
- The Sleeping Car Murders (1965)
- Four Queens for an Ace (1966)
- Time to Live (1969)
- Elise, or Real Life (1970)
- Smic Smac Smoc (1971)
- It Only Happens to Others (1971)
- Last Tango in Paris (1972)
- Paul and Michelle (1974)
- Vincent, François, Paul and the Others (1974)
- Dear Fatherland Be at Peace (1976)
- Le Braconnier de Dieu (1983)
- The Round Up (2010)
- Capitaine Marleau (2017), 1 episode
- Josephine, Guardian Angel (2018)
- Tomorrow Is Ours (2018-2021), 122 episodes
