= Évelyne Bouix =

French actress

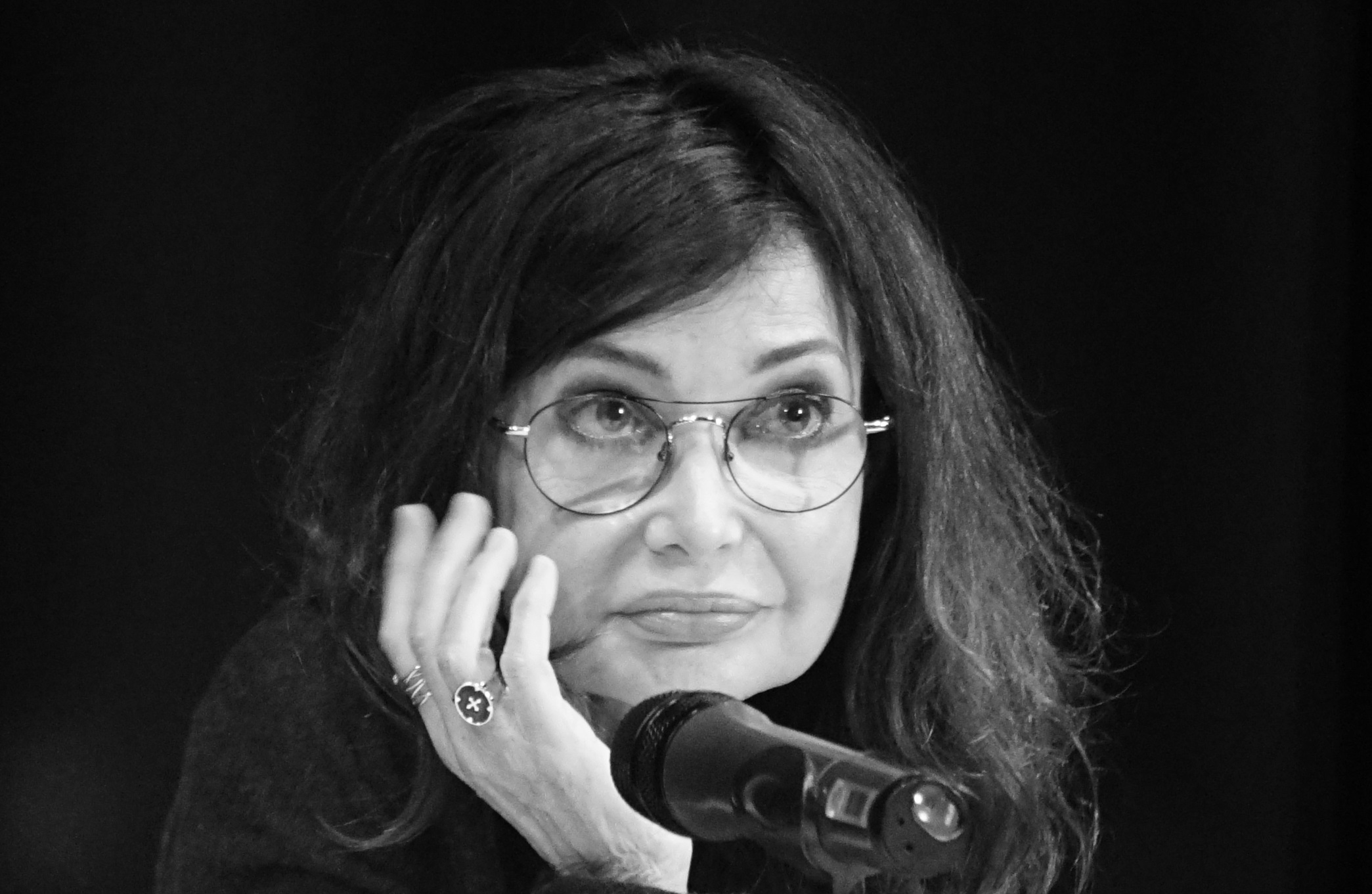
- Bouix in 2018
- Born: Évelyne Lina Madeleine Bouix; 22 April 1953 (age 72); Charenton-le-Pont, France
- Occupation: Actress
- Spouses: Claude Lelouch (m. 1980; div. 1985) Pierre Arditi (m. 2010)

Évelyne Bouix (French: [bwiks]; born 22 April 1953) is a French film actress and stage actress. She has appeared in 61 films since 1970.

She was made Chevalier (Knight) of the Ordre national du Mérite in 1999.

== Selected filmography ==
- Rene the Cane (1977)
- No Trifling with Love (1977)
- Haine (1980)
- Les Uns et les Autres (1981)
- Les Misérables (1982)
- Édith et Marcel (1983)
- Viva la vie (1984)
- Partir, revenir (1985)
- A Man and a Woman: 20 Years Later (1986)
- The Sky Above Paris (1991)
- Tout ça... pour ça ! (1993)
- Beaumarchais (1996)
- Remake (2003)
- A Day at the Museum (2008)
