= Anouchka =

Anouchka is a given name. Notable people with the name include:

- Anouchka Delon (born 1990), French-Dutch actress
- Anouchka Grose (born 1970), British-Australian Lacanian psychoanalyst and writer
- Anouchka Martin (born 1993), French swimmer
- Anouchka van Miltenburg (born 1967), retired Dutch politician
