= The Sleeping Car Murders =

Compartiment tueurs
- Directed by: Costa-Gavras
- Screenplay by: Costa-Gavras
- Based on: The Sleeping Car Murders by Sébastien Japrisot
- Produced by: Julien Derode
- Starring: Yves Montand; Simone Signoret; Catherine Allégret; Jacques Perrin; Michel Piccoli; Jean-Louis Trintignant
- Cinematography: Jean Tournier
- Edited by: Christian Gaudin
- Music by: Michel Magne
- Release date: 1965
- Running time: 89 minutes
- Country: France
- Language: French
- Box office: $8.1 million

The Sleeping Car Murders (also known as The Sleeping Car Murder, French title: Compartiment tueurs) is a 1965 French mystery film directed by Costa-Gavras from the novel by Sébastien Japrisot. It stars Yves Montand, Simone Signoret, Michel Piccoli, Jean-Louis Trintignant, Catherine Allégret, Jacques Perrin, Charles Denner and Pascale Roberts. The film was the directorial debut of Costa-Gavras, to be followed later by other, more politically-oriented work.

== Plot ==
The film begins with a young woman, Bambi (Catherine Allégret), boarding a train from Avignon to Paris. Also on her compartment are her fellow passengers, René Cabourg (Michel Piccoli), Georgette Thomas (Pascale Roberts), Rivolani (Paul Pavel), and famed actress Éliane Darrès (Allégret’s real-life mother Simone Signoret). She also meets Daniel (Jacques Perrin), a stowaway en route to Paris. After helping him avoid the ticket inspector, she allows him to sleep in an empty compartment above hers. Upon reaching Paris, realizing he had nowhere to go, she also allowed him to stay in her apartment and they start a relationship. Meanwhile, in the train, Georgette is found dead in her bunk. Police Inspector Grazziani (Yves Montand) and his assistant Jean-Lou Gabert (Claude Mann) is assigned to handle the case. The other passengers are identified and are told to contact the police as possible eyewitnesses. The police also questioned Georgette’s lover, Bob Vaski (Charles Denner).

Cabourg, who was infatuated with Georgette and had been rebuffed by her on the train was the first to contact the police, but before he was able to testify, he was shot and killed by an unknown assailant. The police start questioning the passengers, starting with Darrès, arriving at her apartment at the same time as Bambi and Daniel were about to return her wallet, taken earlier by Daniel. As the police enter the apartment her lover Éric Grandin (Jean-Louis Trintignant) is seen leaving. From Darrès, the police learn about the altercation between Georgette and Cabourg. She also told them about Daniel, but as the ticket had been registered by another person, they didn’t believe her.

Meanwhile Daniel and Bambi discovered a love letter from Grandin to Darrès in her wallet, as they read the letter the narration turns into a flashback and Darrès reminiscing on her relationship. As she was about to leave her apartment, Darrès was killed by the unknown assailant, while at the same time another assailant murders Rivolani. Both murders also occur before the police were able to talk to them.

Following Darrès’ murder, the police question Grandin as Daniel also arrives to returns the wallet and letter. They also learn that Darrès had asked her brother for a loan to be used to start a farm in South Africa with Grandin, alerting them that Grandin was in financial trouble and in need of money. Meanwhile the police interview Garaudy, the presumed sixth passenger on the compartment, but they discover that she did not board the train.

The assailants came to look for Bambi while only Daniel was present, he narrowly avoided them before warning her about the assailants and telling her to leave her office immediately and hide in a hotel close to her office under his name. He also contacts the police, admitting that he was the sixth passenger and reporting about the assailants.

The police discovered that a large sum of money have been withdrawn from Darrès’ account via a check. They found out that the man on the check is dead, arousing suspicion. Meanwhile, Grazziani found out about Daniel being the sixth passenger and him discovering the assailants, while also learning that Jean-Lou posed as him while contacting Daniel and immediately raced off to find him, causing Grazziani to realize that Jean-Lou is one of the assailants.

Grazziani then contacts Daniel and discovers Daniel told Jean-Lou about being the sixth passenger, while also divulging his and Bambi’s plan to avoid the assailant. Grazziani then races to save both Daniel and Bambi, as he instructs Daniel by phone on what to do with regards to the assailants, while contacting the district police to protect him and find Bambi. He also proposes that Daniel be used as bait to catch the assailants. Grazziani reached Bambi's hotel and upon finding that the district police couldn't find her organized a check on every room, he eventually manages to find her in one of the rooms, while also finding Grandin hiding in the hotel. Grandin divulges the plan to the police, the train murder was only a red herring intended to mask the real target, Darrès, causing the police to focus on the railroad crime and assuming that her murder was to eliminate witnesses, as they steal her money and run away together. He also told them that he and Jean-Lou forged the name on the check using data from the police records.

Meanwhile, Jean-Lou arrives at Daniel’s location, but Daniel manages to escape just as Grazziani arrives. Jean-Lou runs from the scene and a lengthy chase around Paris ensues, with a biker gang aiding the police in following Jean-Lou. The chase ends when Jean-Lou is cornered at a riverside road and he proceeded to shoot himself.

== Cast ==
- Yves Montand as Inspector Grazziani "Grazzi"
- Jacques Perrin as Daniel
- Catherine Allégret as Benjamine Bombat aka "Bambi"
- Pierre Mondy as Superintendent Tarquin
- Claude Mann as Jean-Lou Gabert
- Jean-Louis Trintignant as Éric Grandin
- Simone Signoret as Éliane Darrès
- Charles Denner as Bob Vaski
- Michel Piccoli as René Cabourg
- Pascale Roberts as Georgette Thomas
- Jacques Dynam as Inspector Malec
- André Valmy as Inspector
- Philippe Rouleau as Inspector Antoine
- Maurice Chevit as Inspector Moutard
- Nadine Alari as Mme Grazziani
- Monique Chaumette as Mme Rivolani
- Paul Pavel as Rivolani
- Bernadette Lafont as Georgette's sister
- Christian Marin as Georgette's brother-in-law
- Serge Rousseau as train controller
- Jenny Orléans as Cabourg's sister.
- Claude Dauphin as Eliane's brother
- Daniel Gélin as the veterinarian
- Tanya Lopert as Mme Garaudy
- Charles Millot as medical examiner
- Albert Michel as bartender
- José Artur as journalist
- William Sabatier as Superintendent Tuffi
- Josée Steiner as employee at the hotel Arizona
- André Weber as drunkard at the police headquarters
- Edmond Ardisson as the telephone voice from Marseille
- Jacqueline Staup as Bambi's boss
- Dominique Zardi as Inspector in the café
- Maurice Auzel as Inspector in the café
- Marcel Bozzuffi as policeman
- Georges Géret as policeman
- Dominique Bernard as train employee
- Lionel Vitrant as inspector
- Nicole Desailly: janitor in Eliane's building
- Jean Droze as a man in the Police headquarters
- Claude Berri as a train employee
- Françoise Arnoul as nurse in the veterinarian school
- Serge Marquand as Georgette's lover
- Denise Péron as drunk lady
- Jean-Pierre Périer
- Bernard Paul
- Lucien Desagneaux

== Reception ==
The New York Times said Costa-Gavras "whips it up with a lot of camera trickery and an abundance of cinematic style" but added that "the plot gets so thick and calculated that it becomes temporarily congealed." TV Guide called it "an intriguing, highly entertaining thriller" and praised "Costa-Gavras' taut direction" that "propels this somewhat impenetrable mystery along at breakneck speed." Time Out said that "the ending is one of those ingenious absurdities that haunt the genre, but the lively pace and attention to detail make up for the implausibility."

=== Awards ===
Simone Signoret received a nomination for Best Foreign Actress at the 1967 British Academy Film Awards for her performance. The film also won Best Foreign Film at the 38th National Board of Review Awards, and was also listed among the award ceremonies winners for Best Foreign Films. It was also nominated for the 1967 Edgar Allan Poe Award for Best Motion Picture.
