= Le propre de l'homme =

- Directed by: Claude Lelouch
- Written by: Claude Lelouch
- Produced by: Pierre Braunberger
- Starring: Claude Lelouch; Janine Magnan
- Cinematography: Jean Boffety
- Edited by: Monique Bonnot
- Music by: Ian Bennets; Pete Watson; Alex Campbell
- Distributed by: Mondex Films
- Release date: 1961
- Running time: 90 minutes
- Country: France
- Language: French

Le Propre de l'homme is a 1960 film directed by Claude Lelouch.

== Synopsis ==
Claude and Janine get to know each other through friends. They spend a day in Paris and they become a couple.

An exploration of the formation of a couple from both points of view.

== Details ==
- Director : Claude Lelouch
- Music : Ian Bennets, Pete Watson, Alex Campbell
- Length: 90 minutes
- Release date: 8 March 1961

== Starring ==
- Claude Lelouch : Claude
- Janine Magnan : Janine
- Amidou

== Details ==
This was the first full-length film by Claude Lelouch, and was a complete commercial disaster. All copies were later destroyed by Lelouch himself.
