= Latif Lahlou =

Moroccan film director

- Born: 3 April 1939 (age 86); El Jadida
- Citizenship: Moroccan
- Occupation: Filmmaker
- Notable work: Soleil de printemps

Latif Lahlou (born 3 April 1939 in El Jadida) is a Moroccan filmmaker.

== Career ==
After training in film at the Institut des hautes études cinématographiques (IDHEC) in 1959, Lahlou studied sociology at the Sorbonne. He edited multiple short films in the 1960s. He then joined the CCM (national film center), where he worked as an editor and producer for short films. He participated in the financing of Souheil Benbarka's La guerre du pétrole n'aura pas lieu. He has directed a number of feature films throughout the decades.

== Filmography ==
=== Feature films (as director) ===
- 1969: Soleil de printemps
- 1986: La compromission
- 2007: Les jardins de Samira
- 2010: La grande villa
- 2014: L'anniversaire

=== Documentaries ===
- 1963: Cultivez la Betterave (as editor)
- 1966: Fourrage (as writer)
- 1967: Sin Agafaye (as writer)
- 1968: De Cote de la Tassaout
