= Francis Lai =

French composer (1932–2018)

- Lai in 1972
- Born: Francis Albert Lai; 26 April 1932; Nice, Alpes-Maritimes, France
- Died: 7 November 2018 (aged 86); Paris, France
- Occupation: Film score composer
- Years active: 1952–2018

Francis Albert Lai (French: [fʁɑ̃sis lɛ]; 26 April 1932 – 7 November 2018) was a French composer, noted for his film scores. He won the 1970 Oscar for Best Music, Original Score and the Golden Globe Award for Best Original Score for the film Love Story. The soundtrack album went to No. 2 in the Billboard album charts and the film's theme, "Where Do I Begin", was a hit single for Andy Williams.

He also composed the music of A Man and a Woman, an international success that won the Palme d'Or, a few Academy Awards and Golden Globes.

== Life and career ==
Lai was born on 26 April 1932, in Nice, France, the son of market gardeners of Italian origin. From a very early age, Lai was fascinated by music and he played first in his local regional orchestras. In Marseille he discovered jazz and met Claude Goaty, a singer of popular songs in the 1950s.

While in his twenties, Lai left home and followed Goaty to Paris, where he became part of the Montmartre music scene. At the "Taverne d'Attilio" on the Place du Tertre in Montmartre, Lai met Bernard Dimey with whom Lai composed his first song, the start of a partnership which would produce over one hundred songs. After a short period with the orchestra of Michel Magne, Lai became an accompanist for Édith Piaf and composed for her.

In 1965, he met filmmaker Claude Lelouch and was hired to help write the score for the film A Man and a Woman. Released in 1966, the film was an international success, earning a number of Academy Awards. The young Lai received a Golden Globe Award nomination for "Best Original Score". This initial success brought more opportunities to work for the film industry both in his native France, where he continued to work with Lelouch on scores to films such as Vivre pour vivre (1967), Un homme qui me plaît (1969), Le voyou (1970) and Happy New Year (1973), as well as in the United Kingdom and the United States. He was known for his support of Mireille Mathieu in many compositions and recordings. In 1970 he wrote the score for director René Clément's film, Rider on the Rain ("Le passager de la pluie"). It sold over one million copies and was awarded a gold disc in September 1971.

In 1970, Lai won the Academy Award for Best Music, Original Score and the Golden Globe Award for Best Original Score for the film Love Story. In the United States, the soundtrack album reached No. 2 in the Billboard album charts and the film's theme, "Where Do I Begin", was a hit single with lyrics by Carl Sigman for singer Andy Williams. The song would also be recorded successfully by Lai himself, with a full orchestra, and by Henry Mancini and Shirley Bassey. Lai's "Love Story" theme was heard in the 1978 Love Story sequel titled Oliver's Story, although the main score was composed by Lee Holdridge.

His movie scores included films as diverse as Mayerling, Three into Two Won't Go, International Velvet, Édith et Marcel, and Michael Winner films such as I'll Never Forget What's'isname and Hannibal Brooks. Lai also had success with music written for softcore erotic films like Emmanuelle 2 (1975) and Bilitis (1977). Reviewing the soundtrack for Bilitis for AllMusic, Thom Jurek said: "The result would be hilarious if it weren't so predictable. This music is light to the point of almost not being there... Lai uses synthesizers, acoustic guitars, and a truckload of strings to weave what is supposed to be the perfect setting for two young lovers to do what young lovers do, but has it all coming out of the wash sounding like a commercial for those laundry detergents that are airy fresh, or a silent movie score where the music is supposed to tell you that this is a pensive moment."

His composition "Aujourd'hui C'est Toi" (Today It's You) is probably best known in the UK as the theme music for the long-running BBC current affairs documentary series Panorama.

In a career spanning forty years, Lai also wrote music for television programs and alone or in collaboration with others composed music for more than one hundred films and personally wrote more than six hundred songs. He wrote the music for the Perry Como hit "I Think of You", with lyrics by Rod McKuen.

== Personal life and death ==
In 1968 Lai married Dagmar Puetz. The couple had two sons and one daughter.

Lai died on 7 November 2018, aged 86, at his home in Paris.

== Filmography ==
Lai enjoyed frequent collaborations with French director Claude Lelouch. As a composer, Lai has at least 131 film credits to his name. AllMusic lists 1,321 individual credits.

- A Man and a Woman (1966)
- Vivre pour vivre (1967)
- The Bobo (1967)
- I'll Never Forget What's'isname (1967)
- House of Cards (1968)
- Mayerling (1968)
- 13 jours en France (1968)
- La leçon particulière (1968)
- Life Love Death (1969)
- Hannibal Brooks (1969)
- Three into Two Won't Go (1969)
- Un Homme qui me plaît (1969)
- Rider On The Rain (1970)
- Le Voyou (1970)
- Eyes Full of Sun (1970)
- The Games (1970)
- Hello-Goodbye (1970)
- Berlin Affair (1970)
- Love Story (1970)
- Early Morning (1971 film) (1971)
- The Legend of Frenchie King (1971)
- L'aventure, c'est l'aventure (1972)
- Dust in the Sun (1972)
- Happy New Year (1973)
- Un homme libre (1973)
- Visit to a Chief's Son (1974)
- Loving in the Rain (1974)
- And Now My Love (1974)
- Child Under a Leaf (1974)
- Wanted: Babysitter (1975)
- Emmanuelle 2 (1975)
- The Good and the Bad (1976)
- Body of My Enemy (1976)
- Anima persa (1977)
- Bilitis (1977)
- Another Man, Another Chance (1977)
- Passion Flower Hotel (1978)
- Robert et Robert (1978)
- International Velvet (1978)
- Oliver's Story (1978)
- Beyond the Reef (1981)
- Les Uns et les autres (1981)
- Madame Claude 2 (1981)
- Édith et Marcel (1983)
- Dog Day (1984)
- My New Partner (1984)
- Marie (1985)
- Sins (miniseries)(1986)
- A Man and a Woman: 20 Years Later (1986)
- Attention bandits! (1986)
- Dark Eyes (1987)
- Itinéraire d'un enfant gâté (1988)
- My New Partner II (1990)
- There Were Days... and Moons (1990)
- Les Clés du paradis (1991)
- La Belle Histoire (1992)
- Men, Women: A User's Manual (1996)
- Hasards ou coïncidences (1998)
- Salaud, on t'aime (2014)
- Un plus une (2015)
- The Best Years of a Life (2019)

== Awards ==
- Academy Award for Best Music, Original Score for Love Story (1970)
- Golden Globe Award for Best Original Score for Love Story (1970)
- Lifetime Achievement Award from the World Soundtrack Academy (2014)
- Lifetime Achievement Award, Ghent Film Festival, 2014

Award nominations:

- Golden Globe Award for Best Original Score for A Man and a Woman (1966)
- BAFTA Anthony Asquith Award for Film Music for Vivre pour vivre (1967)
- Golden Globe Award for Best Original Score for Vivre pour vivre (1967)
- Grammy Award for Best Original Score Written for a Motion Picture for Love Story (1970)
- BAFTA Anthony Asquith Award for Film Music for Happy New Year (1973)
- César Award for Best Music Written for a Film for Bilitis (1977)
- César Award for Best Music Written for a Film for Les Uns et les Autres (1981)
- César Award for Best Music Written for a Film for Itinéraire d'un enfant gâté (1988)
- César Award for Best Music Written for a Film for Hasards ou coïncidences (1998)
