= Claude Lelouch =

French filmmaker and writer (born 1937)

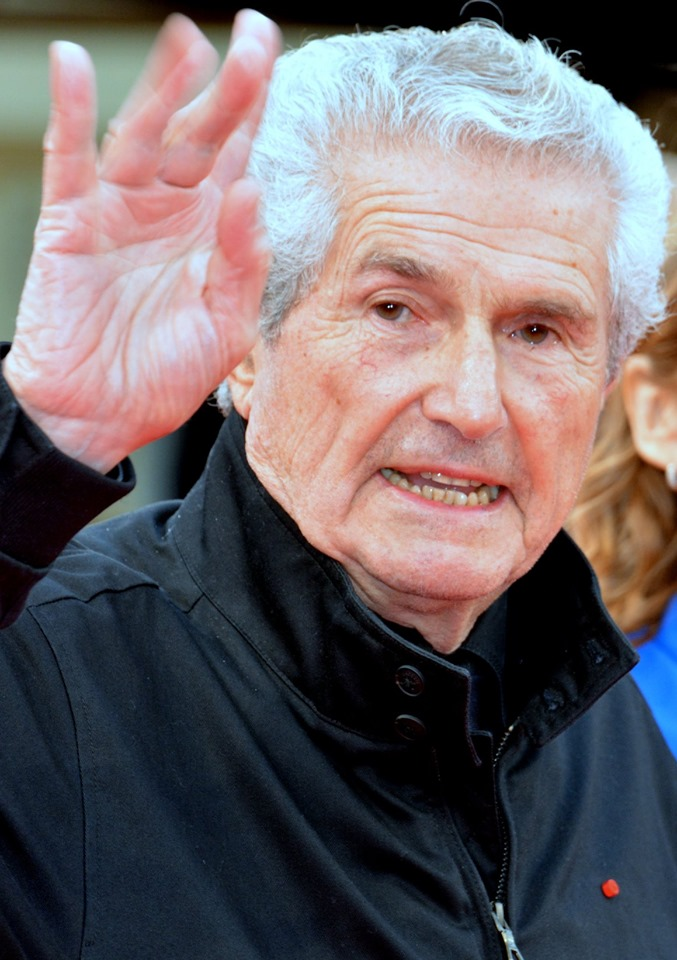
- Lelouch in 2019
- Born: Claude Barruck Joseph Lelouch; 30 October 1937 (age 88); Paris, France
- Occupations: Film director; screenwriter; cinematographer; actor; film producer
- Spouses: Christine Cochet (m. 1968; div. 1972) Évelyne Bouix (m. 1980; div. 1985) Marie-Sophie L. (m. 1986; div. 1992) Alessandra Martines (m. 1993; div. 2009) Valérie Perrin (m. 2023)
- Partner: Gunilla Friden (1970s)
- Children: 7

Claude Barruck Joseph Lelouch (French: [klod ləluʃ]; born 30 October 1937) is a French film director, writer, cinematographer, actor and producer. Lelouch grew up in an Algerian Jewish family. He emerged as a prominent director in the 1960s. Lelouch gained critical acclaim for his 1966 romantic melodrama film A Man and A Woman. At the 39th Academy Awards, A Man and a Woman won Best Original Screenplay and Best International Feature Film. Lelouch was also nominated for Best Director, making him one of the youngest nominees in the category. While his films have gained him international recognition since the 1960s, Lelouch's methods and style of film are known for attracting criticism.

== Life and career ==
Lelouch was born in the 9th arrondissement of Paris to Charlotte (née Abeilard) and Simon Lelouch.

His father was born to an Algerian Jewish family while his mother was a convert to Judaism. Lelouch says that his first contact with cinema was very young: "My mother hid me in movie theaters when I was little. We were wanted by the Gestapo. [...] Cinema, for starters, saved my life." Of his personal faith, he says "Today I believe in God. My faith was sparked when I made a film in Israel. Over there, it is impossible not to believe in God. I loved the places of worship of all the religions. Everything which happens is for the best. I sometimes have the feeling that my inspiration comes from heaven. I think it is wonderful to be Jewish."

His father bought him a camera as a fresh start after his failure in the baccalaureat. He started his career with a reportage – one of the first to film daily life in the Soviet Union, with the camera hidden under his coat as he made his personal journey. He also filmed sporting events, like the 24 Hours of Le Mans and the Tour de France.

Lelouch served in the French Army working in the film unit where he made over 100 films. He was demobilized in 1960.

His first full-length film as director, Le Propre de l'homme, was decried by the critics: "Claude Lelouch, remember this name well, because you will not hear it again" – Cahiers du cinéma said. La femme spectacle (1963), following prostitutes, women shopping, going for nose-jobs, was censored for its misogynist tendency. A Man and a Woman changed his fortunes and was met with favour even by the Cahiers group.

The 1981 musical epic Les Uns et les Autres is widely considered as his masterpiece, and his credits now add up to 50 or so films.

His 1976 film, C'était un rendez-vous purportedly features a Ferrari 275 GTB being driven at extreme speed through the streets of Paris at dawn. The entire short is shot from the point of view of the car. Legend has it that Lelouch was arrested after it was first shown publicly. In a 2006 interview, Lelouch stated that he drove his own Mercedes-Benz 450SEL 6.9 in the film and created a soundtrack of the radically different sounding Italian sports car for effect.

He collaborated more than two dozen times with composer Francis Lai. They scored a great hit with the theme song for the film A Man and a Woman sung by Nicole Croisille and Pierre Barouh, and more than 300 versions of the song exist.

In 1993 he was the president of the jury at the 18th Moscow International Film Festival.

In 2020 Lelouch filmed his own modern 'remake' of his 1976 short film (in collaboration with Ferrari) C'était un rendez-vous entitled Le Grand Rendez-vous, set in Monaco instead of Paris and starring Monegasque racing driver Charles Leclerc. Filming for the new version took place on the Circuit de Monaco on 24 May 2020 and features Leclerc driving a Ferrari SF90 Stradale. It was released on 13 June 2020. The film was criticised by The Verge as 'lifeless'. Top Gear's Chris Harris said on Twitter this version was 'lazy and badly executed'.

== Honours ==
- 2016: Commander in the Order of the Crown
- 2005: Doctor of Philosophy Honoris Causa, Ben-Gurion University of the Negev

== Awards ==
Lelouch's A Man and a Woman won the Palme d'Or at the 1966 Cannes Film Festival, as well as two Oscars including Best Foreign Language Film.

His 1967 film Vivre pour vivre, was nominated for the Best Foreign Language Film Oscar. In 1971, he won the David di Donatello for Best Foreign Directing for Le Voyou.

== Filmography ==
- Quand le rideau se lève (1957)
- Le propre de l'homme (1960)
- L'Amour avec des si (1962)
- La Femme spectacle (1963)
- Une fille et des fusils (1964)
- Les Grands Moments (1965)
- Pour Un Maillot Jaune (1965)
- A Man and a Woman (1966)
- Vivre pour vivre (1967)
- La Vie, l'amour, la mort (1968)
- 13 jours en France (1968)
- Un Homme qui me plaît (1969)
- Le Voyou (1970)
- Smic, Smac, Smoc (1971)
- L'aventure c'est l'aventure (1972)
- Happy New Year (1973)
- Visions of Eight (1973)
- Mariage (1974)
- Toute une vie (1974)
- Le Bon et les méchants (1975)
- Le Chat et la souris (1975)
- C'était un rendez-vous (1976)
- Si c'était à refaire (1976)
- Un autre homme, une autre chance (1977)
- Robert et Robert (1978)
- An Adventure for Two (1979)
- Les Uns et les Autres (1981)
- Édith et Marcel (1982)
- Viva la vie (1983)
- Partir, revenir (1984)
- Attention bandits! (1986)
- Un homme et une femme : vingt ans déjà (1986)
- Itinéraire d'un enfant gâté (1988)
- Il y a des jours... et des lunes (1989)
- La Belle Histoire (1992)
- Tout ça... pour ça ! (1992)
- Les Misérables (1995)
- Lumière et compagnie (1995)
- Hommes, femmes, mode d'emploi (1996)
- Hasards ou coïncidences (1997)
- Une pour toutes (1999)
- And now... Ladies and Gentlemen (2001)
- 11'09"01 September 11 (2002; segment "France")
- Les Parisiens (2004)
- Le Courage d'aimer (2005)
- Roman de Gare (2007; he also appears as "Hervé Picard", a pseudonym)
- Ces amours là (2010)
- D'un film à l'autre (2011)
- Salaud, on t'aime (2014)
- Un plus une (2015)
- Chacun sa vie et son intime conviction (2017)
- The Best Years of a Life (2019)
- La vertu des impondérables (2019)
- Le Grand Rendez-vous (2020) (A modern 'remake' of C'était un rendez-vous set in Monaco starring racing driver Charles Leclerc)
- Love is Better than Life (2021)
- Finalement (2024)

== See also ==
- List of French Academy Award winners and nominees
- List of oldest and youngest Academy Award winners and nominees — Youngest nominees for Best Director
- List of Jewish Academy Award winners and nominees
