= Marie-Sophie L. =

French actress

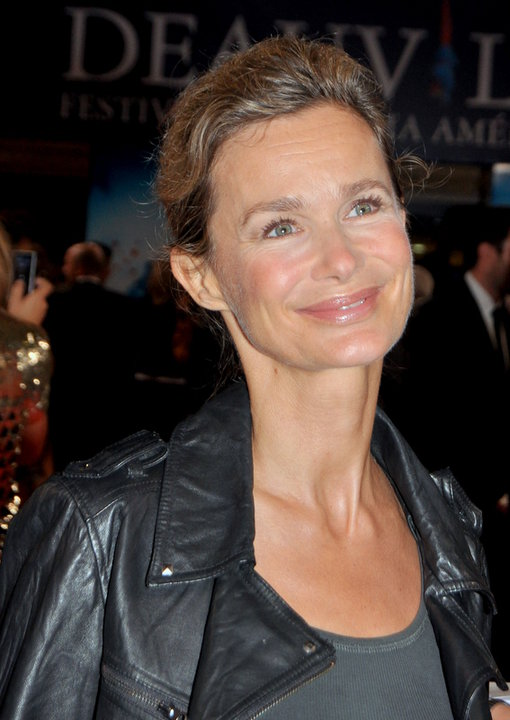
- Marie-Sophie L. in 2010
- Occupations: Actress; author
- Spouse: Claude Lelouch (m. 1986; div. 1992)

Marie-Sophie L. (born Marie-Sophie Pochat; 14 February 1963) is a French actress.

== Life ==
Marie-Sophie L. played her first roles in the theater in 1984. Claude Lelouch cast her as important characters in several of his films. She was also active on television, beginning 1994.

She discovered the raw food movement while in California, and trained at the Living Light Culinary Arts Institute in Fort Bragg. In France, she created L'instant Cru in 2013, relying on a website that broadcasts videos, recipes and online courses.

In 2015, she published a cookbook, L'instant Cru, and in 2018, Raw Food, published by Albin Michel.

== Works ==
- L'instant Cru, Paris: Albin Michel, 2015. ISBN 9782226257369, OCLC 995505101
- Raw Food, 2018
