= Pierre Uytterhoeven =

Belgian screenwriter

Pierre Uytterhoeven is a screenwriter. He won the Academy Award for Best Original Screenplay in 1966 for his work with Claude Lelouch in A Man and a Woman. In 1986 he worked with Lelouch again on the film's sequel, A Man and a Woman: 20 Years Later.

== Filmography ==
- 1971: Le Voyou (story and screenwriter)
- 1973: Happy New Year (screenwriter)
- 1977: The Simple Past (writer)
