= List of French-language films =

The following is a list of French-language films, films mostly spoken in the French language.

== 1900s ==
Year	French title	English title	Directed by
1902	Le Voyage dans la Lune	A Trip to the Moon	Georges Méliès

== 1910s ==
Year	French title	English title	Directed by
1912	La Fièvre de l'or		René Leprince, Ferdinand Zecca
1913	L'enfant de Paris	The Child of Paris	Léonce Perret
1914	Le Roman d'un Mousse	The Curse of Greed	Léonce Perret
1917	La Comtesse de Somerive		Georges Denola, Jean Kemm
1918	Vendémiaire		Louis Feuillade

== 1920s ==
Year	French title	English title	Directed by
1922	La Belle au Bois Dormant		Stéphane Passet
1924	L'heureuse Mort	Happy Death	Serge Nadejdine
1924	Âme d'artiste	Heart of an Actress	Germaine Dulac
1925	Visages d'enfants	Faces of Children; Mother (UK)	Jacques Feyder
1928	La Passion de Jeanne d'Arc	The Passion of Joan of Arc	Carl Theodor Dreyer
1928	L'Argent	Money	Marcel L'Herbier
1929	L'arpète		Émile-Bernard Donatien

== 1930s ==
Year	French title	English title	Directed by
1930	À propos de Nice	About Nice	Jean Vigo
1931	Taris, roi de l'eau	Jean Taris, Swimming Champion	Jean Vigo
1931	À Nous la Liberté	Freedom for Us	René Clair
1933	Zéro de conduite	Zero for Conduct	Jean Vigo
1934	L'Atalante	L'Atalante	Jean Vigo
1935	La Kermesse héroïque	Carnival in Flanders	Jacques Feyder
1937	Drôle de drame ou L'étrange aventure de Docteur Molyneux	Bizarre, Bizarre	Marcel Carné
1937	La Grande Illusion	The Grand Illusion	Jean Renoir
1938	La Femme du boulanger	The Baker's Wife	Marcel Pagnol
1939	La règle du jeu	The Rules of the Game	Jean Renoir

== 1940s ==
Year	French title	English title	Directed by
1942	Les Visiteurs du Soir	The Night Visitors	Marcel Carné
1943	Le Corbeau	The Raven	Henri-Georges Clouzot
1943	Mermoz	Mermoz	Louis Cuny
1944	Béatrice Devant le Désir	Behold Beatrice	Jean de Marguenat
1945	Les Enfants du Paradis	Children of Paradise	Marcel Carné
1945	Les J3	The J3	Roger Richebé
1946	Le Salaire de la Peur	The Wages of Fear	Henri-Georges Clouzot
1946	La Rose de la Mer	The Sea Rose	Jacques de Baroncelli
1946	La Belle et la Bête	Beauty and the Beast	Jean Cocteau
1946	La Tentation de Barbizon	The Temptation of Barbizon	Jean Stelli
1946	Panique	Panic	Julien Duvivier
1948	Le Diable boiteux	The Lame Devil	Sacha Guitry
1949	Le Silence de la mer	The Silence of the Sea	Pierre Melville

== 1950s ==
Year	French title	English title	Directed by
1951	Olivia		Jacqueline Audry
1953	Madame de...	The Earrings of Madame de...	Max Ophüls
1954	Une Visite		François Truffaut
1955	Les Grandes Manoeuvres	The Grand Maneuver	René Clair
1955	Les Diaboliques	Diabolique	Henri-Georges Clouzot
1955	Du Rififi Chez les Hommes	Rififi	Jules Dassin
1957	Les Mistons	The Mischief Makers	François Truffaut
1959	Les Quatre Cent Coups	The 400 Blows	François Truffaut

== 1960s ==
Year	French title	English title	Directed by
1960	À bout de souffle	Breathless	Jean-Luc Godard
1960	Tirez sur le pianiste	Shoot the Piano Player	François Truffaut
1960	Zazie dans le Métro	Zazie in the Metro	Louis Malle
1962	L'amour à vingt ans	Love at Twenty	François Truffaut
1962	Jules et Jim	Jules and Jim	François Truffaut
1962	Cléo de 5 à 7	Cleo from 5 to 7	Agnès Varda
1964	La peau douce	The Soft Skin	François Truffaut
1966	Masculin, féminin		Jean-Luc Godard
1966	Au hasard Balthazar		Robert Bresson
1966	Un Homme et Une Femme	A Man and A Woman	Claude Lelouch
1967	2 ou 3 choses que je sais d'elle	Two or Three Things I Know About Her	Jean-Luc Godard
1967	Belle de jour	Day Lilly/Daylight Beauty	Luis Buñuel
1967	Le Samouraï	The Godson	Jean-Pierre Melville
1967	Soleil O	Oh, Sun	Med Hondo
1967	Alexandre le Bienheureux	Alexander	Yves Robert
1968	Baisers volés	Stolen Kisses	François Truffaut
1968	La Mariée était en noir	The Bride Wore Black	François Truffaut
1969	La sirène du Mississipi	Mississippi Mermaid	François Truffaut
1969	Que la bête meure	This Man Must Die	Claude Chabrol

== 1970s ==
Year	French title	English title	Directed by
1970	Le Cercle Rouge	The Red Circle	Jean-Pierre Melville
1970	L'Enfant sauvage	The Wild Child	François Truffaut
1970	Le Boucher	The Butcher	Claude Chabrol
1970	Domicile conjugal	Bed and Board	François Truffaut
1971	Les deux anglaises et le continent	Two English Girls	François Truffaut
1972	Une belle fille comme moi	Such a Gorgeous Kid Like Me	François Truffaut
1973	La Planète sauvage	Fantastic Planet	René Laloux
1973	Happy New Year		Claude Lelouch
1974	Sweet Movie		Dušan Makavejev
1974	L' Horloger de Saint-Paul	The Clockmaker	Bertrand Tavernier
1974	Toute une vie		Claude Lelouch
1974	Les Valseuses	Going Places	Bertrand Blier
1974	La Nuit américaine	Day for Night	François Truffaut
1975	Jeanne Dielman, 23 quai du Commerce, 1080 Bruxelles		Chantal Akerman
1975	L'Histoire d'Adèle H.	The Story of Adele H.	François Truffaut
1975	Le Chat et la souris		Claude Lelouch
1975	La Bête		Walerian Borowczyk
1976	C'était un rendez-vous		Claude Lelouch
1976	Si c'était à refaire	Second Chance	Claude Lelouch
1976	À nous les petites Anglaises	Let's Get Those English Girls	Michel Lang
1976	Le Bon et les méchants		Claude Lelouch
1976	L'Argent de poche	Small Change	François Truffaut
1976	Monsieur Klein	Mr Klein	Joseph Losey
1976	Le Juge et l'assassin	The Judge and the Assassin	Bertrand Tavernier
1976	Maîtresse	Maîtresse	Barbet Schroeder
1977	L'Homme qui aimait les femmes	The Man Who Loved Women	François Truffaut
1977	Un autre homme, une autre chance	Another Man, Another Chance	Claude Lelouch
1978	Les Bronzés		Patrice Leconte
1978	La Chambre verte	The Green Room	François Truffaut
1979	Les Bronzés font du ski		Patrice Leconte
1979	L'amour en fuite	Love on the Run	François Truffaut
1979	À nous deux	An Adventure for Two	Claude Lelouch
1979	I... comme Icare	I as in Icarus	Henri Verneuil

== 1980s ==
Year	French title	English title	Directed by
1980	Mon oncle d'Amérique	My American Uncle	Alain Resnais
1980	La Boum		Claude Pinoteau
1980	Le Dernier métro	The Last Metro	François Truffaut
1980	Trois hommes à abattre	Three Men to Kill	Jacques Deray
1981	Diva	Diva	Jean-Jacques Beinex
1981	Le Pont du Nord		Jacques Rivette
1981	La Femme d'à côté	The Woman Next Door	François Truffaut
1981	Les Uns et les Autres		Claude Lelouch
1982	Le Beau Mariage	A Good Marriage	Eric Rohmer
1983	L'été meurtrier	One Deadly Summer	Jean Becker
1983	Vivement dimanche!	Confidentially Yours	François Truffaut
1984	Viva la vie!		Claude Lelouch
1984	Péril en la demeure	Death in a French Garden	Michel Deville
1985	Trois hommes et un couffin	Three Men and a Cradle	Coline Serreau
1985	Subway	Subway	Luc Besson
1986	Tenue de soirée	Ménage	Bertrand Blier
1986	Jean de Florette	Jean de Florette	Claude Berri
1986	Manon des Sources	Manon of the Spring	Claude Berri
1986	Le Rayon vert	The Green Ray	Éric Rohmer
1986	Sarraounia	Sarraounia	Med Hondo
1987	Sous le soleil de Satan	Under the Sun of Satan	Maurice Pialat
1987	Attention bandits!		Claude Lelouch
1987	Tandem		Patrice Leconte
1987	Au revoir les enfants	Goodbye, Children	Louis Malle
1988	Une affaire de femmes	Story of Women	Claude Chabrol
1988	Le Grand bleu	The Big Blue	Luc Besson
1988	Ne réveillez pas un flic qui dort	Let Sleeping Cops Lie	José Pinheiro
1988	Itinéraire d'un enfant gâté		Claude Lelouch
1989	Monsieur Hire	Monsieur Hire	Patrice Leconte
1989	La Vie Et Rien D’autre	Life and Nothing But	Bertrand Tavernier

== 1990s ==
Year	French title	English title	Directed by
1990	Cyrano de Bergerac		Jean-Paul Rappeneau
1990		Singapore Sling	Nikos Nikolaidis
1991	Les Amants du Pont-Neuf	The Lovers on the Bridge	Leos Carax
1991	Delicatessen	Delicatessen	Jean-Pierre Jeunet
1992	La Belle histoire		Claude Lelouch
1992	Cuisine et dépendances		Philippe Muyl
1992	C'est arrivé près de chez vous	Man Bites Dog	Rémy Belvaux, André Bonzel & Benoît Poelvoorde
1993	Tout ça... pour ça!		Claude Lelouch
1993	Le Sexe des étoiles	The Sex of the Stars	Paule Baillargeon
1993	Tango	Tango	Patrice Leconte
1993	Trois couleurs: Bleu		Krzysztof Kieślowski
1993	Un, deux, trois, soleil		Bertrand Blier
1993	Ma saison préférée	My Favorite Season	André Téchiné
1994	La Reine Margot	Queen Margot	Patrice Chéreau
1994	Un indien dans la ville	Little Indian, Big City	Hervé Palud
1994	Bonsoir	Good evening	Jean-Pierre Mocky
1994	Trois couleurs: Blanc		Krzysztof Kieślowski
1994	Trois couleurs: Rouge		Krzysztof Kieślowski
1994	Le Cri du cœur	The Heart's Cry	Idrissa Ouedraogo
1994	La Cité de la peur	La Cité de la peur (aka Le film de les Nuls)	Alain Berbérian
1995	Les Trois Frères	The Three Brothers	Les Inconnus / Didier Bourdon and Bernard Campan
1995	La Cité des enfants perdus	The City of Lost Children	Marc Caro & Jean-Pierre Jeunet
1995	La Haine	Hate	Mathieu Kassovitz
1995	Le Péril jeune		Cédric Klapisch
1996	Chacun cherche son chat		Cédric Klapisch
1996	Ridicule		Patrice Leconte
1996	Ponette		Jacques Doillon
1998	Alice et Martin	Alice and Martin	André Téchiné
1998	Kirikou et la sorcière	Kirikou and the Sorceress	Michel Ocelot
1998	Hasards ou coïncidences		Claude Lelouch
1998	Pièces d'identités	Identity Pieces	Mweze Ngangura
1998	Serial Lover		James Huth
1998	Taxi	Taxi	Gérard Pirès
1998	Le Gone du Chaâba	The Kid from Chaaba	Christophe Ruggia
1998	Woubi Chéri		Laurent Bocahut, Philip Brooks
1999	Romance	Romance	Catherine Breillat
1999	Pourquoi pas moi?	Why Not Me?	Stéphane Giusti
1999	La Veuve de Saint Pierre		Patrice Leconte
1999	Beau travail	Beau Travail	Claire Denis
1999	La Fille sur le pont		Patrice Leconte
1999	Une pour toutes		Claude Lelouch

== 2000s ==
Year	French title	English title	Directed by
2000	Le Goût des autres		Agnès Jaoui
2000	Gouttes d'eau sur pierres brûlantes	Water Drops on Burning Rocks	François Ozon
2000	La Vache et le président	The Cow and the President	Philippe Muyl
2000	Taxi 2	Taxi 2	Gérard Krawczyk
2000	Sous le sable	Under the Sand	François Ozon
2000	Baise-Moi	Baise-Moi	Virginie Despentes and Coralie Trinh Thi
2000	Princes et princesses	Princes and Princesses	Michel Ocelot
2000	Le Battement d'ailes du papillon	Happenstance	Laurent Firode
2000	Les Destinées Sentimentales	Sentimental Destinies	Olivier Assayas
2001	À ma sœur!	Fat Girl	Catherine Breillat
2001	Chaos	Chaos	Coline Serreau
2001	Va savoir	Who Knows?	Jacques Rivette
2001	Le Peuple Migrateur	Winged Migration	Jacques Cluzaud, Michel Debats and Jacques Perrin
2001	La Pianiste	The Piano Teacher	Michael Haneke
2001	Comment j'ai tué mon père	How I Killed My Father	Anne Fontaine
2001	Marie-Jo et ses 2 amours	Marie-Jo and Her 2 Lovers	Robert Guédiguian
2001	Le Pacte des loups	Brotherhood of the Wolf	Christophe Gans
2001	Le fabuleux destin d'Amélie Poulain	Amélie	Jean-Pierre Jeunet
2001	L'Homme que j'aime	The Man I Love	Stéphane Giusti
2002	Être et Avoir	To Be and To Have	Nicolas Philibert
2002	Une Femme de ménage		Claude Berri
2002	Ah! Si j'étais riche	If I Were a Rich Man	Gérard Bitton and Michel Munz
2002	L'Auberge espagnole	The Spanish Apartment	Cédric Klapisch
2002	Une employée modéle	A Model Employee	Jacques Otmezguine
2002	Bord de mer	Seaside	Julie Lopes-Curval
2002	17 fois Cécile Cassard	Seventeen Times Cecile Cassard	Christophe Honoré
2002	Ma vraie vie à Rouen	The True Story of My Life in Rouen	Olivier Ducastel and Jacques Martineau
2002	L'homme du train	The Man on the Train	Patrice Leconte
2003		The Five Obstructions	Lars von Trier and Jørgen Leth
2003	Un homme, un vrai	A Man, a Real One	Arnaud Larrieu and Jean-Marie Larrieu
2003	Haute tension	High Tension	Alexandre Aja
2003	Taxi 3	Taxi 3	Gérard Krawczyk
2003	Bon voyage	Have a Good trip	Jean-Paul Rappeneau
2003	Filles uniques	Sole Sisters	Pierre Jolivet
2003	Monsieur N.		Antoine de Caunes
2003	Swimming Pool	Swimming Pool	François Ozon
2003	Corps à corps	Body to Body	François Hanss
2003	Qui a tué Bambi?	Who Killed Bambi?	Gilles Marchand
2003	Les Sentiments		Noémie Lvovsky
2003	Monsieur Ibrahim et les fleurs du Coran	Monsieur Ibrahim	François Dupeyron
2003	La Grande séduction	Seducing Doctor Lewis	Jean-François Pouliot
2003	Les Invasions barbares	The Barbarian Invasions	Denys Arcand
2003	Je reste!	I'm Staying!	Diane Kurys
2003	Jeux d'enfants	Love Me If You Dare	Yann Samuell
2003	Pas sur la bouche	Not on the Lips	Alain Resnais
2003	À la petite semaine	Nickel and Dime	Sam Karmann
2004	Anatomie de l'enfer		Catherine Breillat
2004	La Peau blanche	White Skin	Daniel Roby
2004	Lila dit ça	Lila Says	Ziad Doueiri
2004	Le Grand Voyage	The Grand Voyage	Ismaël Ferroukhi
2004	5x2	5x2	François Ozon
2004	À ton image	In Your Image	Aruna Villiers
2004	Une vie à t'attendre	I've Been Waiting So long	Thierry Klifa
2004	Banlieue 13	District B13	Pierre Morel
2004	Comme une image	Look at Me	Agnès Jaoui
2004	Clean	Clean	Olivier Assayas
2004	Les Choristes	The Chorus	Christophe Barratier
2004	Brodeuses	A Common Thread	Eléonore Faucher
2004	Un long dimanche de fiançailles	A Very Long Engagement	Jean-Pierre Jeunet
2004	Le Silence de la Mer	The Silence of the Sea	Pierre Boutron
2005	Au-delà de la haine	Beyond Hatred	Olivier Meyrou
2005	L'Enfant	The Child	Jean-Pierre & Luc Dardenne
2005	Le Courage d'aimer	The Courage of Love	Claude Lelouch
2005	Crustacés et coquillages	Cockles & Muscles	Olivier Ducastel & Jacques Martineau.
2005	Joyeux Noël	Merry Christmas	Christian Carion
2005	Peindre ou faire l'amour	To Paint or Make Love	Arnaud Larrieu and Jean-Marie Larrieu
2005	La Moustache	The Moustache	Emmanuel Carrère
2005	Les Poupées Russes		Cédric Klapisch
2006	Poltergay		Éric Lavaine
2006	Les Bronzés 3 - amis pour la vie		Patrice Leconte
2006	Azur et Asmar	Azur & Asmar: The Princes' Quest	Michel Ocelot
2006	Je vais bien, ne t'en fais pas	Don't Worry, I'm Fine	Philippe Lioret
2007	7 Ans	7 Years	Jean-Pascal Huttu
2007	Ensemble, c'est tout	Hunting and Gathering	Claude Berri
2007	La Môme	La Vie en Rose	Olivier Dahan
2007	À l'intérieur	Inside	Julien Maury and Alexandre Bustillo
2008	Invités Surprises	Guests surprised	Mike Yoboué
2008	Bienvenue chez les Ch'tis	Welcome to the Land of Shtis	Dany Boon
2008	Il y a longtemps que je t'aime	I've Loved You So Long	Philippe Claudel
2008	Martyrs		Pascal Laugier
2009	White Material		Claire Denis
2009	Le fauteuil	The Armchair	Missa Hebié
2009	1943 Le temps d'un répit	A pause during the Holocaust	André Waksman
2009	Un prophète	A Prophet	Jacques Audiard
2009	Le Hérisson	The Hedgehog	Mona Achache

== 2010s ==
Year	French title	English title	Directed by
2010	Copie conforme	Certified Copy	Abbas Kiarostami
2010	Incendies	Incendies	Denis Villeneuve
2010	Elle s'appelait Sarah	Sarah's Key	Gilles Paquet-Brenner
2010	Les Aventures extraordinaires d'Adèle Blanc-Sec	The Extraordinary Adventures of Adèle Blanc-Sec	Luc Besson
2010	La Princesse de Montpensier	The Princess of Montpensier	Bertrand Tavernier
2011	Nos résistances	15 Lads	Romain Cogitore
2011	Polisse	Poliss	Maïwenn
2011	Intouchables	Untouchable	Éric Toledano and Olivier Nakache
2011	Monsieur Lazhar	Monsieur Lazhar	Philippe Falardeau
2012	Amour	Amour	Michael Haneke
2012	Le Prénom	What's in a Name?	Alexandre de La Patellière Matthieu Delaporte
2012	Ce que le jour doit à la nuit	What the Day Owes the Night	Alexandre Arcady
2012	De rouille et d'os	Rust and Bone	Jacques Audiard
2013	BoOzy' OS et la Gemme de Cristal	BoOzy' OS and the Cristal Gem	Julien Rocca-Darcin
2013	La Vie d'Adèle – Chapitres 1 & 2	Blue Is the Warmest Colour	Abdellatif Kechiche
2013	Les Grandes Ondes (à l'ouest)	Longwave	Lionel Baier
2014	Qu'est-ce qu'on a fait au Bon Dieu ?	Serial (Bad) Weddings	Philippe de Chauveron
2014	La Famille Bélier	The Bélier Family	Éric Lartigau
2014	Mommy	Mommy	Xavier Dolan
2014	Respire	Breathe	Mélanie Laurent
2014	Saint Laurent	Saint Laurent	Bertrand Bonello
2014	Deux jours, une nuit	Two Days, One Night	Jean-Pierre & Luc Dardenne
2015	Nous trois ou rien	All Three of Us	Kheiron
2016	Frantz	Frantz	François Ozon
2016	Demain tout commence	Two Is a Family	Hugo Gélin
2016	Mal de Pierres	From the Land of the Moon	Nicole Garcia
2016	Juste la fin du monde	It's Only the End of the World	Xavier Dolan
2016	Nocturama	Nocturama	Bertrand Bonello
2017	120 battements par minute	BPM (Beats per Minute)	Robin Campillo
2017	Call Me by Your Name	Call Me by Your Name	Luca Guadagnino
2017	Au revoir là-haut	See You Up There	Albert Dupontel
2017	Jusqu'à la garde	Custody	Xavier Legrand
2018	Climax	Climax	Gaspar Noé
2018	Eva	Eva	Benoît Jacquot
2018	Le Grand Bain	Sink or Swim	Gilles Lellouche
2018	Mauvais herbes	Bad Seeds	Kheiron
2018	L'Autre continent	Territory of Love	Romain Cogitore
2018	Les Confins du Monde	To the Ends of the World	Guillaume Nicloux
2018	Un peuple et son roi	One Nation, One King	Pierre Schoeller
2019	Le Chant du loup	The Wolf's Call	Antonin Baudry
2019	Mon inconnue	Love at Second Sight	Hugo Gélin
2019	Portrait d'une jeune fille en feu	Portrait of a Lady on Fire	Céline Sciamma
2019	Zombi Child	Zombi Child	Bertrand Bonello

== 2020s ==
Year	French title	English title	Directed by
2021	La Vengeance au Triple Galop		Alex Lutz and Arthur Sanigou
2021	Cœurs vaillants	Valiant Hearts	Mona Achache
2022	Close	Close	Lukas Dhont
2022	Coma	Coma	Bertrand Bonello
2022	Frère et Sœur	Brother and Sister	Arnaud Desplechin
2022	Neneh Superstar	Neneh Superstar	Ramzi Ben Sliman
2022	L'Innocent	The Innocent	Louis Garrel
2022	Tirailleurs	Father & Soldier	Mathieu Vadepied
2022	Tori et Lokita	Tori and Lokita	Jean-Pierre & Luc Dardenne
2022	En Corps	Rise	Cédric Klapisch
2022	Les Survivants	White Paradise	Guillaume Renusson
2023	La Bête dans la jungle	The Beast in the Jungle	Patric Chiha
2023	Les Trois Mousquetaires : D'Artagnan	The Three Musketeers: D'Artagnan	Martin Bourboulon
2023	Les Trois Mousquetaires : Milady	The Three Musketeers: Milady	Martin Bourboulon
2023	Little Girl Blue	Little Girl Blue	Mona Achache
2023	Anatomie d'une chute	Anatomy of a Fall	Justine Triet
2023	Une zone à défendre	A Place to Fight For	Romain Cogitore
2023	Le Consentement	Consent	Vanessa Filho

== See also ==
- List of French films
- List of Quebec films
