= Taris =

Taris may refer to:

- Félicien Taris (born 1978), French singer
- Jean Taris (1909–1977), French swimmer
- Taris (Star Wars), a fictional planet in the Star Wars franchise
- Taris, one of the titles for a 1931 French short documentary film directed by Jean Vigo, about the French swimmer Jean Taris
