= Lys Gauty =

French cabaret singer and actress (1900–1994)

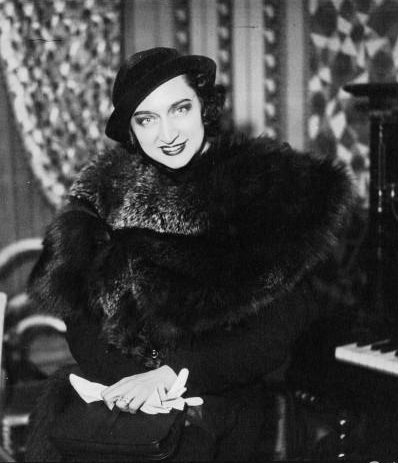
- Gauty in 1934
- Born: Alice Bonnefoux Gauthier; 2 February 1900; Levallois-Perret, Île-de-France, France
- Died: 2 January 1994 (aged 93); Monte Carlo, Monaco
- Occupations: Singer actress
- Spouse: Gaston Groeuer

Lys Gauty (born Alice Bonnefoux Gauthier, 2 February 1900 – 2 January 1994) was a French cabaret singer and actress. Her most significant work came in the 1930s and 1940s as Gauty appeared in film, and recorded her best-known song, "Le Chaland qui passe", which is an interpretation of an Italian composition.

== Biography ==
Born in Levallois-Perret, France, Gauty was the daughter of a mechanic and seamstress. Aspiring to be an opera singer, she worked as a shop-girl at a tailor store called the Galeries Lafayette, saving some of her earnings, and portions donated to her by Gauty's parents to receive a classical music education at Nelson Fyscher in Paris. In 1922, Gauty began her musical career as a cabaret singer at variety shows arranged by operetta composer Georges Van Parys, who accompanied her on piano. She married her booking agent, Swiss music director Gaston Groeuer, who had taken over ownership of the Theatre des Dix Heures in Brussels, Belgium. At the music hall, Gauty commenced her successful stretch in Parisian music halls, intermittently performing at the Theatre des Dix Heures for 12 years.

She became a celebrated figure in music halls such as the Olympia, the Empire, the Alcazar, and the ABC. Gauty began recording in 1927, creating her most popular recorded performance in the same year—a French rendition of the Italian love-song, Parlami d'amore Mariù, re-titled Le Chaland qui passe. Beginning in 1930, Gauty started to dabble in cinema soundtracks, singing for Maurice Gleize's Wedding Day. Another notable recording was made into the theme song for René Clair's film Quatorze juillet in 1933. Le Chaland qui passe was also introduced into the 1934 film L'Atalante when it was renamed after the song in an attempt to become more popular among the public.

Gauty was awarded a Grande Prix du Disque for her role in the French adaptation of German composer Kurt Weill's The Threepenny Opera. In addition, Weill supplied her with another of her popular songs, "La Complainte de la Seine". When a period of rampant antisemitism had spread across France in the mid-1930s, Gauty was one of the few artists to show her support for the Jewish people by singing the composition "Israel, va-t'en". In 1940, following a tour in South America, Gauty returned to France, which had been conquered by Nazi Germany. Under threat of deportation and questioned about her Jewish husband, she, like several other French musicians, agreed to perform in Germany throughout the Second World War. Before the war's conclusion, Gauty had escaped to Monaco where she performed with pianist Léo Ferré, who also composed songs for her.

Upon her return to France, Gauty only briefly continued her music career. Considered as a "collaborator" in the Nazi regime, she was targeted by members of the French Resistance, and survived an assassination attempt. In her later years, Gauty owned a casino in Luchon and became a singing teacher. She died on 2 January 1994 in Cap d'Ail. Her songs have been reissued on compilation albums throughout the years, including Le Chaland qui passe and Lys Gauty: Succès et raretés.

== Songs ==
1928

- Paradis du rêve (Richepin-Fyscher)
- Haine d'amour (Sureau-Bellet)
- Vendetta (Nazelles-Desmoulins-Penso)
- La Tour Saint-Jacques
- Because "I Know You're Mine"
- Tu sais (Berys-Lenoir-Walter-Ervande)

1930

- La Légende des grains de beauté (Boyer-Archambaud)
- Une femme (Blemont-Heine-Lazzari)
- Mais quand c'est toi
- Frileuse
- Déjà
- Le Chaland qui passe (1933), (C.A.Bixio-A.de Badet) song added to a version of the film L'Atalante (Jean Vigo) re-named Le Chaland qui passe for the occasion.

1932

- Valparaiso
- Une Viennoise
- Un coup de riquiqui
- J'aime tes grands yeux
- Chant de Barbara (Kurt Weill-Mauprey
- La Fiancée du pirate (Kurt Weill-Mauprey)
- L'amour qui passe
- Qui j'aime
- Caramba
- Tu m'as fait tant souffrir
- Prends-moi dans tes bras
- Ma chérie
- Coup de soleil
- Si je vous tutoie

1933

- J'aime tes grands yeux
- Les marins de Surcouf
- Le piano mécanique
- Hot Voodoo
- J'ai tout trouvé près de toi
- Je te regarde dormir
- Bye Bye
- Départ (Goener-Tranchant)
- La Ballade du cordonnier (Tranchant)
- C'est le plaisir que j'aime
- Mon cœur est léger
- Loin de toi
- Les deux guitares
- La prière du pauvre homme
- Viens ou L'amour est un caprice
- À Paris dans chaque faubourg (Maurice Jaubert-René Clair), chanson du film Quatorze juillet de René Clair dans lequel elle apparaît.

1934

- Le Bistro du port
- Complainte désabusée
- Rêve d'amour
- Nostalgie
- Libre de moi
- Israël va-t-en
- Chanson de l'escadrille (Arthur Honegger-Joseph Kessel)
- La Complainte de la Seine (Kurt Weill-Maurice Magre)
- Je ne t'aime pas (Kurt Weill-Maurice Magre)
- Un soir d'hiver...tard (Celerier-Pradier)
- Le moulin qui jase (Badet-Bols)
- La Mary Salope
- L'amour tel qu'on le parle
- Dans tes bras doucement
- Chanson du cul de jatte
- L'auto du charbonnier
- Moi et l'Impératrice
- Pour toi je veux rêver
- Les larmes

1935

- Ça sent la friture
- Chéri dis-moi je t'aime (Bos)
- La belle escale
- Je t'aime, c'est tout
- Mirages
- Un jour de différence
- Quel beau dimanche! (Charles Trenet-Groener-Heim)
- Vieille ballade
- Au revoir, bon voyage
- Obsession
- La chanson du brave homme
- Exil
- J'attends un navire (Kurt Weill-Jacques Deval)
- Sammy de la Jamaïque (Goer-Michel Vaucaire)

1936

- Espoir (Wal-Berg/Henneve)
- Sur les bords de la Seine
- J'ai trouvé le bonheur
- Une chanson d'amour
- Certitude
- Colin maillard
- La Marie-Louise
- Manola

1937

- Qu'importe si tu pars
- En souvenir des dimanches
- Sous l'enseigne lumineuse
- Souvenir de bal
- Allons-nous promener
- Tes bras
- Presque rien
- Au revoir et adieu
- Croyez-moi
- Conversation tango
- Le chaland qui reste
- Sans y penser
- L'heure du rêve
- A l'aventure

1938

- Gentiment
- Le Bassin de la Villette (Goer-Michel Vaucaire)
- Y'a de l'amour dans mon cœur
- Une femme, un accordéon, un caboulot
- Ce soir ou bien jamais
- J'ai juré de t'aimer toujours
- Souviens-toi de ce dimanche
- Dis-moi pourquoi ? (Joseph Kosma-Vaucaire-Groener) and Le bonheur est entré dans mon cœur from the film La Goualeuse by Fernand Rivers.

1939

- La valse au village
- Amour en mineur
- Ne voyez-vous pas?
- Tu sais pour qui je chante
- La rosière du régiment
- La belle marinière
- Échanges (Mireille-René Dorin)

1940

- J'écoute la pluie
- Pour vous, Michina
- On me prend pour un ange
- Les petits pavés
- La chanson de Nina
- Les escargots qui vont à l'enterrement (Prévert-Kosma)

1941

- Fumée sur le toit
- Revenir
- La valse de toujours
- Ce jour-là

1942

- Prière au vent du soir
- On en fait vite le tour
- Aujourd'hui, bal de nuit
- Prière au vent du soir
- Pas grand-chose

1943

- Crépuscule (Django Reinhardt-Francis Blanche)
- La chanson que je chante
- La chanson de la rue
- Un soir sur le port

1944

- Échos

1946

- La complainte du corsaire
- En écoutant mon cœur chanter
- Un petit bouquet de violettes
- La chanson du bonheur
- Monde
- La plus belle chanson

1949

- Te voyo benn
- Mon caboulot

1950

- Au fil de la Seine
- Comme un air d'accordéon

1951

- Moi j'aime ça
- Pays perdu
- Mon cœur pleure pour vous
- Y'a tant d'amour

?

- Avec sa pomme
- Mon cœur est fait pour t'aimer
- Infidèle
- Rêver!..
- La garce
- Le bonheur n'est plus un rêve
- Suzon
- La lettre d'un bleu

== Bibliography ==
- Gianni Lucini, Luci, lucciole e canzoni sotto il cielo di Parigi – Storie di chanteuses nella Francia del primo Novecento), Novara, Segni e Parole, 2014, 160 p. (ISBN 978-88-908494-4-2)

== Sources ==
- Livret du CD " Lys Gauty ", collection " Les voix d'or ", chez Marianne Melodie.
