= À propos de Nice =

1930 film

- Directed by: Jean Vigo; Boris Kaufman
- Written by: Jean Vigo
- Cinematography: Boris Kaufman
- Edited by: Jean Vigo, Boris Kaufman
- Release date: 28 May 1930
- Running time: 25 minutes
- Country: France
- Language: Silent

À propos de Nice (1930) by Jean Vigo

À propos de Nice is a 1930 silent short documentary film directed by Jean Vigo and Boris Kaufman. The film depicts life in Nice, France by documenting the people in the city, their daily routines, a carnival and social inequalities. Vigo described the film in an address to the Groupement des Spectateurs d'Avant-Garde: "In this film, by showing certain basic aspects of a city, a way of life is put on trial... the last gasps of a society so lost in its escapism that it sickens you and makes you sympathetic to a revolutionary solution."

À propos de Nice was Vigo's first film. It was followed by Taris, roi de l'eau (1931), Zéro de conduite (1933) and L'Atalante in 1934, the year Vigo died.

== Background ==
Vigo, suffering from tuberculosis, worked as an assistant cameraman for a small company in Nice. After his father-in-law gave him and his wife $250, Vigo bought his own Debrie camera. In the summer of 1929 in Paris, Vigo met Boris and Mikhail Kaufman, the brothers of Dziga Vertov. Boris Kaufman was interested in Vigo's idea about making a film on the city of Nice, and the two, together with their wives, created a script. Vigo saved ends of film from his work and the filming was underway by year's end. In the film, Vigo wanted to avoid a travelogue approach and show the boredom of the upper class in the casinos and at the shore, and the struggle of the poor inhabitants in the slums. As Vigo and Kaufman were unable to shoot inside casinos, they decided to concentrate on the strength of their images and use juxtaposition in their editing.

== Plot ==
The film begins with aerial shots and soon shows closer footage of palm trees and waves crashing ashore. The camera concentrates on people; workers performing their daily chores and wealthy persons walking in the boulevards, sailing, playing games and relaxing at the Promenade des Anglais, as well as race car drivers competing in Grand Prix motor racing. After that, the film shows the poorer neighbourhood and poverty; women doing laundry and children playing their simple games in the streets. This is followed by a carnival; processions, masks and tourists dancing and celebrating. The film ends with images of statues and men working in a factory.

== Music ==
The film premiered with a new score by Michael Nyman at the Barbican Theatre on 21 October 2005. The score was regarded as thematically fitting but not successful at capturing the film's humor.

== See also ==
- O Dreamland – a 1953 short made by Lindsay Anderson, an admirer of Vigo.

== Bibliography ==
- Gomes, P. E. Salles (1998). Jean Vigo. Paris: Editions du Seuil, 1957. ISBN 0-571-19610-1.
- Le Cain, Maximilian. "Jean Vigo". Senses of Cinema. Archived from the original on 5 February 2007.
- Temple, Michael (2011). Jean Vigo. Manchester University Press. ISBN 9780719056338.
- Wakeman, John (1987). World Film Directors, Volume 1, 1890–1945. New York: The H. W. Wilson Company, 1987. ISBN 978-0-82420-757-1.
- Weir, David (2014). Jean Vigo and the Anarchist Eye. Atlanta: On Our Own Authority!. ISBN 978-0990641810.
