= Jean Dasté =

French actor (1904–1994)

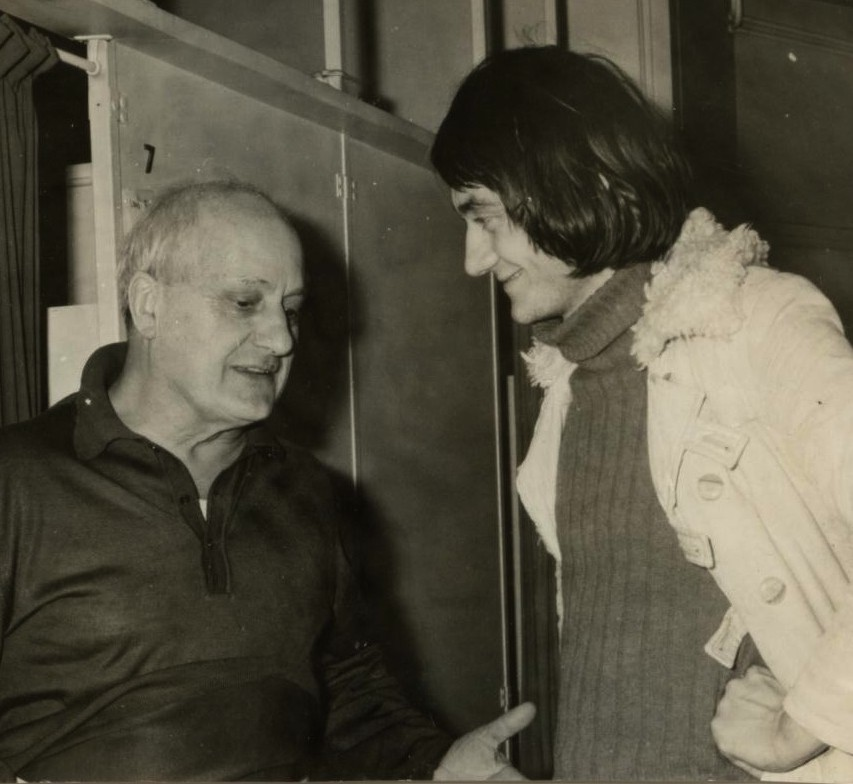
- Dasté (left) in 1974
- Born: Jean Georges Gustave Dasté; 18 September 1904; Paris, France
- Died: 15 October 1994 (aged 90); Saint-Priest-en-Jarez, France
- Occupations: Actor, director

Jean Dasté (born Jean Georges Gustave Dasté; 18 September 1904 – 15 October 1994) was a French actor and theatre director.

Although Jean Dasté is best known for his career on stage as both an actor and director in a variety of works including those by Shakespeare and Molière, he made his first appearance on screen in a 1932 Jean Renoir film (Boudu sauvé des eaux), and 57 years later appeared in his final film at the age of 85. He played also the main character in two Jean Vigo movies, L'Atalante and Zéro de conduite. Later, he worked also with Alain Resnais and François Truffaut.

== Personal life ==
He married Danish-born actress Marie-Hélène Copeau (1902–1994), the daughter of the influential French writer, editor, and drama critic Jacques Copeau (1879–1949) and Agnès Thomsen. His daughter, Catherine Dasté, married Graeme Allwright, both were students at the Old Vic Theatre School in London In 1947,Jean Dasté became the founding director of the Comedie de St.-Etienne stage company in the town of Saint-Étienne in the Loire department. A theatre, La Comédie de Saint-Étienne, with its own acting school, is located in a square, Place Jean Dasté, named in his honour.

== Filmography as actor ==
- Boudu sauvé des eaux (Boudu Saved from Drowning) (1932) - The student
- Zéro de conduite (Zero for Conduct) (1933) - Surveillant Huguet
- L'Atalante (1934) - Jean
- Le Crime de monsieur Lange (The Crime of Monsieur Lange) (1936) - The Model maker
- Sous les yeux d'occident (Under Western Eyes) (1936) - Georges
- La vie est à nous (1936) - L'instituteur/Teacher
- La Grande Illusion (Grand Illusion) (1937) - The teacher
- Le Temps des cerises (The Time of the Cherries) (1938) - Le fils du directeur / The director's son
- Remorques (1941) - Le radio
- Croisières sidérales (1942) - Pépin
- Picpus (1943) - Le clerc
- Une étoile au soleil (1943)
- Adieu Léonard (1943) - Le raccommodeur de porcelaine
- La Grande Meute (1945) - L'huissier
- Le Mystère Saint-Val (1945) - L'huissier
- Muriel ou Le temps d'un retour (1963) - L'homme à la chèvre / The Goat Man
- Heaven on One's Head (Le Ciel sur la tête) (1965) - M. Bazin
- La guerre est finie (The War Is Over) (1966) - Le chef du réseau clandestin / Chief
- Z (1969) - Illya Coste
- L'Enfant sauvage (The Wild Child) (1970) - Professor Philippe Pinel
- Beau Masque (1972) - Cuvrot
- Les Jours gris (1974) - Le vieil homme
- Le Petit Marcel (1976) - Berger
- Le Corps de mon ennemi (1976) - Le gardien du chantier / Keeper
- L'Homme qui aimait les femmes (The Man Who Loved Women) (1977) - Docteur Bicard
- La Chambre verte (The Green Room) (1978) - Bernard Humbert
- Utopia (1978) - Jean
- Molière (1978) - The grandfather
- La Tortue sur le dos (1978) - Bad-tempered invalid
- Rue du Pied de Grue (1979) - Tonton
- Mon oncle d'Amérique (My American Uncle) (1980) - M. Louis
- Une semaine de vacances (1980) - Le père de Laurence
- Le Crime d'amour (1982) - L'homme de l'asile
- Les Îles (1983) - Jean
- L'Amour à mort (1984) - Dr. Rozier
- Le Moine et la Sorcière (1987) - Christophe
- Nuit docile (1987) - Le chauffeur de taxi
- Noce blanche (1989) - Le concierge
- Projections (1990) - Le propriétaire de la salle de cinéma (final film role)

== Additional resources ==
- Dasté, Jean. Voyage d'un comédien. Paris: Stock, 1977. ISBN 9782234006737
- Mignon, Paul-Louis. Jean Dasté. Paris: Les Presses Littéraires de France, 1953.
- Rousset, Hughues, editor. Jean Dasté: un homme de théâtre dans le siècle. L'Etrat: Actes graphiques, 2015. ISBN 9782368830147
