= Boris Kaufman =

Russian-born cinematographer (1906-1980)

- Бори́с Ка́уфман
- Born: Boris Abelevich Kaufman; August 24, 1906; Białystok, Grodno Governorate, Russian Empire (present-day Poland)
- Died: June 24, 1980 (aged 73); New York City, New York, U.S.
- Education: University of Paris
- Occupation: Cinematographer
- Relatives: Dziga Vertov (brother); Mikhail Kaufman (brother)
- Awards: Academy Award for Best Cinematography; 1955 On the Waterfront

Boris Abelevich Kaufman, ASC (also spelled Kauffman; Russian: Бори́с А́белевич Ка́уфман; August 24, 1906 – June 24, 1980) was a Russian cinematographer, who spent the majority of his professional life in France (1929-1940) and then the United States (1944-1970). Born in the Grodno Governorate of the Russian Empire, present-day Poland, he was the younger brother of noted Soviet filmmakers Dziga Vertov and Mikhail Kaufman.

Kaufman was known for his skillful use of black-and-white palettes and his poetic realist style of photography. He worked with such directors as Jean Vigo, Alexandr Hackenschmied, Elia Kazan and Sidney Lumet. He won the Academy Award for Best Cinematography, Black-and-Whie for On the Waterfront (1954), with a second nomination for Baby Doll (1956).

== Early life ==
Kaufman was born into a family of Jewish intellectuals in Białystok when Congress Poland was part of the Russian Empire. At the outbreak of World War I in 1914, the family moved to Moscow.

After the Bolshevik Revolution of 1917, Poland regained its independence, and Boris moved there with his parents, before then moving to Paris to study philosophy and literature at the Sorbonne. Mikhail and Denis, better known as Dziga Vertov, stayed in the Soviet Union and became important filmmakers, producing avant-garde and agitprop films. The brothers later stayed in touch primarily by letters; Vertov visited Boris Kaufman in Paris twice, in 1929 and 1931.

== Career ==
=== In France ===
After graduating from the Sorbonne, Kaufman turned to cinematography at the recommendation of his brothers. Kaufman later credited Mikhail with teaching him the art of motion picture photography. He collaborated with Jean Vigo and Dimitri Kirsanoff, with his cinematography helping to define the look of poetic realism.

During World War II, he served in the French Army against the Nazis; when France fell, Kaufman escaped to Canada. After working briefly with John Grierson for the National Film Board of Canada, he moved to the United States in 1942.

=== In the United States ===
Kaufman supported himself by filming short subjects and documentaries until director Elia Kazan chose him as director of photography for On the Waterfront (1954), Kaufman's first American feature film, for which he won an Academy Award for Best Cinematography (Black and White) and a 1955 Golden Globe Award. For Kazan's Baby Doll (1956), he received a second Oscar nomination.

Kaufman's other most fruitful collaboration was with director Sidney Lumet. During an 11-year period between 1957 and 1968, the two worked on seven films together: 12 Angry Men (1957), That Kind of Woman (1959), The Fugitive Kind (1960), Long Day's Journey Into Night (1962), The Pawnbroker (1964), The Group (1966), and Bye Bye Braverman (1968).

Films he shot for other directors included George Roy Hill's The World of Henry Orient, Jules Dassin's Uptight (1968), and his final film, Otto Preminger's Tell Me That You Love Me, Junie Moon (1970).

== Later life and death ==
Retiring in 1970, he died in New York City on June 24, 1980, 3 months after his brother Mikhail. Kaufman's papers were donated to Yale University.

== Filmography ==
=== Feature films ===
Year	Title	Director	Notes
1933	Zero for Conduct	Jean Vigo	
1933	The Agony of the Eagles	Jean Mamy	
1934	L'Atalante	Jean Vigo	
1934	The Path to Happiness	Jean Mamy	
1934	Zouzou	Marc Allégret	
1936	You Can't Fool Antoinette	Paul Madeux	
1936	When Midnight Strikes	Léo Joannon	
1937	Cinderella	Pierre Caron	
1938	Fort Dolorès	René Le Hénaff	
1939	The Fatted Calf	Serge de Poligny	with Philippe Agostini
1940	Serenade	Jean Boyer	with Claude Renoir
1954	On the Waterfront	Elia Kazan	First American film
1954	Garden of Eden	Max Nosseck	
1956	Singing in the Dark	Max Nosseck	
1956	Patterns	Fielder Cook	
1956	Crowded Paradise	Fred Pressburger	
1956	Baby Doll	Elia Kazan	
1957	12 Angry Men	Sidney Lumet	
1959	That Kind of Woman	Sidney Lumet	
1960	The Fugitive Kind	Sidney Lumet	
1961	Splendor in the Grass	Elia Kazan	
1962	Long Day's Journey Into Night	Sidney Lumet	
1963	All the Way Home	Alex Segal	
1964	The World of Henry Orient	George Roy Hill	
1964	The Pawnbroker	Sidney Lumet	
1966	The Group	Sidney Lumet	
1968	Bye Bye Braverman	Sidney Lumet	
1968	The Brotherhood	Martin Ritt	
1968	Uptight	Jules Dassin	
1970	Tell Me That You Love Me, Junie Moon	Otto Preminger	

=== Short films ===
Year	Title	Director	Notes
1929	À propos de Nice	Jean Vigo	
1931	Jean Taris, Swimming Champion	Jean Vigo	
1944	Hymn of the Nations	Alexander Hammid	
1945	A Better Tomorrow	Alexander Hammid	
1949	Roller Derby Girl	Justin Herman	
1951	The Gentleman in Room Six	Alexander Hammid	
1965	Film	Alan Schneider	

=== Documentary films ===
Year	Title	Director	Notes
1947	Journey Into Medicine	Willard Van Dyke	
1952	Leonardo da Vinci	Luciano Emmer	

== Awards and nominations ==
Award	Year	Category	Work	Result	Ref.
Academy Award	1955	Best Cinematography, Black-and-White	On the Waterfront	Won	
Academy Award	1957	Best Cinematography, Black-and-White	Baby Doll	Nominated	
Golden Globes	1955	Best Cinematography - Black-and-White	On the Waterfront	Won	
