= Mi casa es tu casa =

Mi casa es tu casa (informal) or mi casa es su casa is a Spanish expression of welcome meaning "My house is your house".

As a title, these phrases may refer to:

- "Mi Casa es tu Casa", a project by computer artist Sheldon Brown
- Mi casa es tu casa, a 2002 film starring Fanny Gautier
- "Mi Casa Es Su Casa", a 2007 single by Félicien Taris (with Los Niños)
- "Mi Casa Es Su Casa", a 2009 single by Toni Zen
