= A Place to Fight For =

2023 film by Romain Cogitore

- Film poster
- French: Une zone à défendre
- Directed by: Romain Cogitore
- Written by: Romain Cogitore; Thomas Bidegain; Catherine Paillé
- Produced by: Hugo Sélignac; Nicolas Dumont
- Starring: François Civil; Lyna Khoudri
- Cinematography: Julien Hirsch
- Edited by: Florent Vassault
- Music by: Mathieu Lamboley
- Production company: Chi-Fou-Mi Productions
- Distributed by: Disney+
- Release dates: 8 June 2023 (Madrid); 7 July 2023 (France)
- Running time: 103 min
- Country: France
- Language: French
- Budget: €7,4 million

A Place to Fight For (French: Une zone à défendre) is a 2023 French romantic thriller film written and directed by Romain Cogitore, starring François Civil and Lyna Khoudri. This is Disney+'s first original French film. The film had its world premiere at the festival Francia está en pantalla in Madrid, Spain on 8 June 2023, followed by a special screening at the Cabourg Film Festival on 17 June 2023, and it was released in France and around the world by Disney+ on 7 July 2023.

== Plot ==
Greg is an undercover police lieutenant who must collect information on eco-activists and infiltrates a movement at a ZAD (Zone to Defend), that is fighting to save a forest from the building of a dam. There he meets Myriam, an environmental activist known as "zadist", and despite not necesseralily admitting it to themselves, they like each other. 18 months later, Greg returns to the ZAD in a follow-up to his official mission and finds out that Myriam had a baby by him. He finds himself increasingly torn between her, their son and his duties as a police officer.

== Cast ==
- François Civil as Greg
- Lyna Khoudri as Myriam
- Nathalie Richard as Severine
- Bellamine Abdelmalek as Naël
- Hugo Rossano Parvez as Théo
- Arthur Rossano Parvez as Théo
- Anne Alvaro as Chantal
- Chantal Trichet as Suzanne
- Manon Bresch as Fred
- Mona Walravens as Lucia
- Candice Bouchet as Béné
- Adilé David as Pauline
- Arnaud Churin as Hubert
- Céline Carrère as Catherine
- Nico Rogner as Niko
- Oona von Maydell as Jana
- Caroline Gay as Yaël
- Félix Bossuet as Fissou
- Elliot Daurat as Ewen
- Hadi Rassi as Zap
- Farid Bouzenad as Hakim
- Oscar Copp as Thibaut
- Marie Berto as DGSI Director
- Hicham Loubar as 4-year-old Théo

== Production ==
=== Development ===
Director and screenwriter Romain Cogitore announced the project (then-titled Zad) in an interview for French newspaper Dernières Nouvelles d'Alsace on 26 February 2016. The screenplay was co-written by Cogitore, Thomas Bidegain and Catherine Paillé, and it was inspired by a real-life scandal that happened in England and hit the European press in 2011, revealing long-term police missions of eco-infiltrators, some of them even had children with activists before disappearing. The film was produced by Chi-Fou-Mi Productions. Mathieu Lamboley composed the film's original score.

The project was developed through the TorinoFilmLab Script & Pitch programme in 2016 under the title A Zone to Defend.

On 11 July 2022, Disney+ announced the shooting of its first original French film, Une zone à défendre, directed by Romain Cogitore with François Civil and Lyna Khoudri in the lead roles, and that it was set to be released on Disney+ in France and around the world in 2023. Cogitore had previously directed Civil in his feature film directorial debut, the 2011 World War II drama 15 Lads (Nos Résistances). This film, whose English title is A Place to Fight For, is the third collaboration between Civil and Khoudri, who had worked together on the French dubbing of the animated film Lightyear in 2022, and also co-starred in the two-part saga The Three Musketeers: D'Artagnan and The Three Musketeers: Milady, both released in 2023.

Cogitore explained the film in a press release in July 2022:

With 'A Place to Fight For', I want to place environmental and political issues within the framework of a love story, to place myself in a double cinematographic genre - the undercover film and melodrama - to recount a moment in our contemporary history, which zadists and collapsologists call "the collapse of the old world".

While shooting their first film together in 2009, 15 Lads, which had young guerrillas as protagonists, Cogitore and Civil wondered "who are the resistance fighters today?", and the ZAD seemed to be the place of the current fight in France to them. "It corresponded to a moment in my life when I was beginning to have an ecological conscience, and their fight touches me. I have a lot of admiration for people who take a step aside from the irrepressible march of our world, those who go against the grain, swim against the tide. This radicalism, these sacrifices in the service of noble causes, such as equality, social justice, respect for the environment, it inspires me," Civil told Le Figaro. Cogitore said that after his second film, Territory of Love (2018), he wanted to work on a melodrama again and wondered what impossible love could be told today. "An undercover cop falling in love with someone on the opposite side, that seemed like a good place to start. The basis of the story is love. That's what led me to discover the ZAD", Cogitore told TF1.

Cogitore extensively investigated the ZADs and even lived at a ZAD along with environmental activists in order to make the film more credible. The director immersed himself in one of the largest ZADs in France where he explained his project to activists. "I wanted to be extremely faithful, not to be above ground. I'm not the only one to have this desire to tell the story of the ZAD or the investment of activists, but it's complicated in the production system. We are told that it's not glamorous", he said. Cogitore also asked Civil to read the book Undercover: The True Story of Britain's Secret Police to prepare himself for the film.

Khoudri said that what made her accept the film was the script–it was the first time that she had read something like that and had access to this universe. She did not know the ZADs before accepting the project, and when she met Cogitore, who spent a lot of time at the ZAD, it really captivated her. Civil said he accepted the project due to his history with Cogitore, as they have remained close since working together in 15 Lads, so when Cogitore offered him the role of Greg, he said "yes" immediately.

When French magazine Numéro asked the two main actors about the impact the film could have, Khoudri said; "With this film, it's the first time that we've really entered a ZAD... I just hope that we haven't betrayed anyone, because there is necessarily a responsibility that comes with the fact that the story can resonate with the news. But it is difficult to anticipate the impact that the film could have." And Civil added; "Yes, it's true that the impact is very hard to measure, but the origin of the project, and what convinced us, was this: trying to show a ZAD, in a more realistic way than parodic representations, cliche or that we can see on the news channels that tell us a little about the same scenes of riots. We really tried to pay tribute to these people who sacrifice part of their comfort for their ideals and their commitment. As Lyna said, we were lucky to have Romain who investigated the ZADs a lot and who fed us with all that."

=== Filming ===
Principal photography started on 13 June 2022 and wrapped on 12 August 2022. Filming took place in Paris, Essonne, Marseille, Normandy and Melun.

Nearly 200 extras acted on the film, and nearly two-thirds of the extras were real Zadists. It was not possible to shoot on a real ZAD due to restricted access and ecological reasons. Production designer Pascale Consigny and head set builder Gérard David recreated an entire ZAD based on the photos provided by director Romain Cogitore, who had spent a lot of time on a ZAD at Notre-Dame-des-Landes.

== Marketing ==
Disney France unveiled on Twitter the first image from the film with François Civil and Lyna Khoudri on 12 November 2022. On 29 January 2023, Disney France unveiled a new image of Civil on the set of the film to celebrate the actor's birthday. A new still featuring François Civil and Lyna Khoudri dancing at a party was unveiled on 5 May 2023. The release date and a new set of film stills were unveiled by Disney on 12 May 2023.

The first poster was unveiled by Disney+ on 6 June 2023. The trailer was unveiled on 17 June 2023. A clip from the film was released on 5 July 2023.

== Soundtrack ==
The album with the film's original soundtrack, composed by Mathieu Lamboley, was released by Hollywood Records on 28 July 2023. Lamboley used a mix of Brazilian Batucada and Viola da gamba. Lamboley said of the score:

I imagined this soundtrack as a clash of sounds from the new and old world. A hybrid music, with Brazilian percussion which highlights the feeling of group, collective, and the viola da gamba which evokes past centuries and the baroque style.

The Zadists sing a song of resistance, "Lundi, tu démolis" (English: "Monday, you demolish"), written by Romain Cogitore, who also wrote the lyrics for the song featured in the end credits, "Wood Chains", with music written by Lamboley and performed by Nathan Symes.

Une Zone à Défendre (Bande originale du film)

Soundtrack album by Mathieu Lamboley
- Released: 28 July 2023
- Genre: Film soundtrack
- Length: 40:20
- Label: Hollywood Records

=== Track listing ===
All music is composed by Mathieu Lamboley.

Une Zone à Défendre (Bande originale du film) track listing
No.	Title	Lyrics	Performer	Length
1.	"Arrive"			1:56
2.	"Fight"			1:48
3.	"Now Rest"			2:29
4.	"Under the Cover"			2:46
5.	"For the Cabines"			2:48
6.	"There Is Hope"			1:30
7.	"When the World Collapse"			2:19
8.	"Sabotage Is a Way"			2:27
9.	"Gigue De Rio"			2:13
10.	"Wind and Leaves"			0:54
11.	"Whirl of Doubts"			3:47
12.	"Mother's Heart Cracking"			1:48
13.	"Run for Cover"			3:06
14.	"Milonga"			2:55
15.	"A Baby Sleeps"			1:16
16.	"Tears Roll In"			2:53
17.	"Wood Chains"	Romain Cogitore	Nathan Symes	3:15
Total length:				40:20

== Release ==
The film had its world premiere at the festival Francia está en pantalla in Madrid, Spain on 8 June 2023. It had a special screening at the Cabourg Film Festival in France on 17 June 2023, and it was released in France and around the world by Disney+ on 7 July 2023, the same day the film was released in Canada by Star+, and in the United States by Hulu. The film was released in English-speaking countries as A Place to Fight For.

== Reception ==
=== Streaming viewership ===
According to the streaming aggregator JustWatch, A Place to Fight For was the 5th most streamed film across all platforms in France during the weekend of 8-9 July 2023.

=== Critical response ===
AlloCiné, a French cinema site, gave the film an average rating of 3.3/5, based on a survey of 8 French reviews.

Sandrine Bajos of Le Parisien gave the film 4 out of 5 stars and wrote; "Behind what might look like a nice melodrama, Romain Cogitore signs an important and useful film on commitment, the dying planet and the zadists, these activists who regularly make the headlines. Carried by a very good duo of actors, this film is a very nice surprise."

Yoann Jenan of Télé Loisirs gave the film 4 out of 5 stars and wrote; "From this hybrid film is born a story that holds up from start to finish."

Laurent Djian of Télé 7 Jours gave the film 3 out of 5 stars, calling it "A fiction without downtime, which intelligently navigates between thriller and romantic drama."

Augustin Pietron-Locatelli of Télérama gave the film 3 out of 5 stars, writing; "Far from the frank “society” comedy that one might fear, the first French production of Disney+ is a melodrama more interested in romance than politics."

Fabrice Leclerc of Paris Match wrote; "Carried by an elegant staging, daring sequence shots, "A Place to Fight For" is a beautiful object of cinema and confirms, if it were still needed, the talent of François Civil, who carries from start to finish this well thought-out movie."

Le Parisien ranked the A Place to Fight For at number four in its list of top 10 films of 2023 from streaming platforms.

== Awards and nominations ==
Year	Award	Category	Nominee(s)	Result	Ref.
2016	TorinoFilmLab	Script & Pitch	A Place to Fight For	Nominated	
2016	Fondation Gan	—N/a	A Place to Fight For	Nominated	
2024	Prix des auditeurs France Musique - Sacem	Best Original Score	Mathieu Lamboley	Pending	
