= Armchair =

Armchair may refer to:

- Armchair (furniture), a chair with arm rests
- Armchair (band), a Thai pop rock band
- Armchair (bus company), in London
- Armchair nanotube, a carbon nanotube with chiral symmetry
- "Armchair", a song by Avail from their 1996 album 4am Friday
- "Armchairs", a song by Andrew Bird from his 2007 album Armchair Apocrypha

== See also ==
- The Armchair, a 2009 Burkinabé film directed by Missa Hebié
