= François de Maucroix =

French poet and translator

François de Maucroix, born in Noyon, Province of Picardy in 1619, died 1708, was a French poet and translator.

== Biography ==
He was a long-time friend of La Fontaine; their mutual literary influence was important, and it was to him that La Fontaine addressed the first book of fables (III), The Miller, his Son and the Ass.

He was ordained as a priest, and in the Spring of 1647, he purchased a prebendary. He remained canon of Rheims until his death in 1708.

Contrary to the popular legend, de Maucroix was not definitely a classmate of La Fontaine's at Chateau Thierry. Pierre Clarac has remarked that, at about the age of 25, while they were a part of the Knights of the Round Table (Literary Circle), who were a group of ('robins'?) who met from 1646 to discuss their works and diverse other subjects, that although being on first-name term with Pellison and Cassandre, Maucroix still used the more formal 'vous' when addressing La Fontaine.

Several of his chansons were set to music by Maurice Jaubert.

== Works ==
- Des poèmes et des traductions, publiés en 1685 dans les Ouvrages de Prose et de Poësie des Sieurs de Maucroy et de La Fontaine
- Sa Correspondance, publiée en 1854.

== Sources ==
- Translated as best as possible with limited resources from fr:François de Maucroix
