= Maurice Jaubert =

French composer (1900–1940)

Maurice Jaubert (3 January 1900 – 19 June 1940) was a prolific French composer who scored some of the most important films of the early sound era in France, including Jean Vigo’s Zero for Conduct and L'Atalante, and René Clair’s Quatorze Juillet and Le Dernier Milliardaire. Many of his film scores were used as the basis for concert pieces. The song "À Paris, dans chaque faubourg" remains well known today. François Truffaut used his music posthumously in four of his films.

Serving in both world wars, he died in action during World War II at the age of 40.

== Early life and education ==
Born in Nice on 3 January 1900, he was the second son of François Jaubert, a lawyer who would become the president of the Nice bar. Jaubert grew up in a musical household, and began playing the piano aged five. After gaining his baccalaureat from the Lycée Masséna in Nice in 1916, he enrolled at the Nice Conservatory of Music, where he studied harmony, counterpoint and piano. He was awarded the first piano prize in 1916. He left for Paris and studied law and literature at the Sorbonne. When he returned to his native town in 1919, he was the youngest lawyer in France.

== Career ==
=== Beginnings ===
His first compositions date from this period but soon after he undertook his military service and became an officer in engineering. Demobilized in 1922, Jaubert decided to give up law practice and devote all his time to music. The next year, he completed his musical education in Paris with Albert Groz, while undertaking a variety of music related jobs such as proof correction and checking Pleyela rolls.

Jaubert's compositions in the early 1920s include songs, piano pieces, chamber music, and divertissements. He wrote his first stage music in 1925 for a play by Calderón, Le Magicien prodigieux, using the Pleyela, a revolutionary player piano at the time. He was then hired by Pleyel to record rolls on the Pleyela. Indeed, Jaubert was always attracted by technical innovations that could serve his artistic aspirations. While working on this play, he met a young soprano, Marthe Bréga, who would sing most of his vocal compositions. They married in 1926, with Maurice Ravel as Jaubert's best man. They had a daughter, Françoise, in 1927. His 'poème chorégraphique' Le Jour was premiered by the Orchestre Symphonique de Paris under Pierre Monteux in 1931, while a Suite française was premiered by Vladimir Golschmann in St Louis the following year.

His music was written in a style of clarity, frankness and freedom, in which he did not seek novelty for the sake of it and in which his spontaneity is not weighed down by pedantic formulas. His writings comprise articles and lectures, as well as a large number of letters that capture his political opinions. how he viewed his times, and his musical tastes (for example, he was a strong supporter of Kurt Weill when that composer was widely misunderstood).

=== Film scores ===
In 1929, while pursuing his work for the concert hall and the stage, Maurice Jaubert began writing and conducting for cinema. He collaborated with prominent directors such as Alberto Cavalcanti (Le Petit Chaperon Rouge), Jean Vigo (Zero for Conduct and L'Atalante), René Clair Quatorze Juillet and Le Dernier Milliardaire, Julien Duvivier (Carnet de bal and La Fin du Jour, Marcel Carné’s Drôle de drame, Hôtel du Nord, Quai des brumes (Port of Shadows), and Le Jour se lève (Daybreak) and Henri Storck’s Belgian documentaries.

He also worked briefly in the UK, scoring We Live in Two Worlds directed by Cavalcanti and produced by John Grierson.

In his films L'Histoire d'Adèle H. (1975), L'Homme qui aimait les femmes (1977) and La Chambre verte (1978) and Small Change (Divertimento from the Sonata a due), François Truffaut uses music by Jaubert.

=== Conductor ===
Although Maurice Jaubert understood and appreciated film, composing and scoring them was but one of his creative activities. As music director of Pathé-Nathan studio, he conducted the film scores of several other composers, including Arthur Honegger and Darius Milhaud. In the 1930s he gained a reputation as a conductor in France and abroad, most notably for the final season of Marguerite Bériza's opera company and the season of opéras-bouffes for the 1937 exposition (where he also led the premiere of his Jeanne d’Arc, Op. 61, a 'Symphonie concertante pour soprano et orchestre'). At the Comédie des Champs-Élysées, in 1937 he conducted the premiere of Philippine, an opérette, by Marcel Delannoy with libretto by Henri Lyon and Jean Limozin. The 'complainte de l'homme serpente' "Ah! Elle était de type femme" was recorded on Columbia by Hugues Cuénod with an orchestra conducted by Jaubert in November 1937.

== Personal life ==
=== Death ===
War, however, disrupted Jaubert's artistic path. Mobilized in September 1939, he joined an engineering company he would command as a reserve captain. His letters to his wife reflect a spirit of sacrifice tinged with deep humanism. Jaubert did not live to hear his last two compositions, written at his base camp. He was fatally wounded at Azerailles and died a few hours later at the Baccarat Hospital on 19 June 1940. According to some accounts he had just successfully blown up a bridge, or been struck by gunfire from a machine gun or, according to Desbiolles, hit by shrapnel.

Jean Rivier's Heureux ceux qui sont morts (in memory of Maurice Jaubert, text by Charles Péguy) and Henry Barraud's Offrande à une ombre, for orchestra (1941–42) in memory of Maurice Jaubert were played at 'In memoriam: concert in memory of political deportees who died for France', by the Orchestre national et chœurs de la Radiodiffusion Française (dir. Manuel Rosenthal) on 2 November 1944 (Palais de Chaillot). They also played Jaubert's Jeanne d'Arc and planned to play works written by two other composers killed in action in 1940 : Jehan Alain's Prière pour nous autres charnels (text by Charles Péguy) and Jean Vuillermoz's Veglione but they were unable to get the score of the latter work back to Paris in time, and instead gave Jaubert's Géographies.

In 1952, the composer’s remains were relocated from the Baccarat cemetery to the Caucade Cemetery in Nice. An official state funeral was finally held on 18 October. Maryline Desbiolles's novel Le Beau Temps is about Maurice Jaubert's life (Éd. Seuil, 2015)

== Credits ==
- L'absente (poem by Franz Toussaint, from Le jardin des caresses, no. 139, Paris, Éd. Piazza), for voice and piano;
- Feuillet d'album (song for high voice, words Stéphane Mallarmé), Paris: Heugel, op. 2, 1926 (full score on IMSLP and on Gallica);
- Suite en la for cello and piano op. 5, 1923, Editions Jobert;
- Cinq chants sahariens op. 8, set of 5 melodies for pour soprano, oboe, string quartet and percussion, 1924 (on anonymous Tuareg poems);
- Impromptu for piano (Ed Jobert), 1925 (according to Desbiolles, p. 66)
- Les Pêcheurs (1925) : divertissement for singers and dancers in one tableau, texts by Claude-André Puget, op. 11, 1925;
- Le Tombeau de l'amour op. 13 (4 songs on poems from Charles-Albert Demoustier's Lettres à Émilie, 1786 : Sous ces pavots...; Ah! si mon sort vous intéresse...; De nos vergers, de nos prairies...; Exilée au sein de Paris), Paris: Heugel, 1926 (score on IMSLP and : full score on Gallica);
- Le Magicien prodigieux: incidental music for the drama by Pedro Calderon de la Barca, op. 14, 1925 : 9 pieces for pleyela player piano, percussion, 2 soprani and 2 mezzi. Includes Opus 14A: Nocturne, interlude et pastorale for orchestra, Théâtre Albert-Ier, December 2, 1925, with Marthe Brega (Commissioned by Henri Ghéon);
- 4 Romances sur des poèmes de Paul-Jean Toulet (songs for high voice), Paris: Jobert, 1925 ('En Arles', dedicated to Roland-Manuel ; 'Les trois dames d'Albi' (to Marcel Delannoy) ; 'Plus oultre' (to Arthur Honegger) ; 'Le temps d'Adonis' (to Jacques Brillouin, a man of the film world);
- Deux Poèmes de Malherbe op. 15 : No.1 Dessein de Quitter Une Dame, No.2 Chanson, for soprano, tenor and piano. First performed on December 5, 1926, Paris, by Marthe Bréga;
- Elpénor op. 16 (two songs, 'Chanson De La Sirène Rousse' and 'Chanson Du Pilote'), poems by Jean Giraudoux by Suzanne Peignot, the Roth quartet and Jaubert. Théâtre du Vieux-Colombier on April 26, 1929, concert organised by La Sirène musicale (Éditions de La Sirène);
- Six inventions for piano op. 18 played by Maurice Jaubert at the same April 1929 concert.;
- Contrebande, op. 19 (1927) : chamber opera based on a text by Georges Neveux;
- Trois sérénades op. 21: 'La Traversée' (Guillaume Apollinaire), 'Pour Virginie' (Francis Jammes), 'Airs' (Jules Supervielle), by Ninon Vallin, Théâtre du Vieux-Colombier, 1928, with another performance at L'Artistique (Nice, 27 Bd Dubouchage) on March 8, 1929;
- Terminus, op. 22: music for the play by Henry Soumagne, directed by Gaston Baty, Paris, Théâtre de l'Avenue, 10 September 1928. Includes “'C'est l'avenir, c'est le passé”': separate score for voice and piano;
- Avenue 30, op. 23: divertissement by Paul Colline, sketches by Simon Gantillon and Marcel Espiau, performed by Renée Falconetti, Paris, Théâtre de l'Avenue, 31 May 1930. For orchestra, and also for 7 instruments;
- Suite for piano op. 24, from his music for the silent film The Wonderful Lies of Nina Petrovna by Hanns Schwarz (1929). The suite includes a 'Rêverie' dedicated to the memory of Erik Satie;
- Intermezzo en forme de rondeau for piano and orchestra, also taken from his score for The Wonderful Lies of Nina Petrovna, op. 24B, 1929;
- Juliette ou La clé des songes, Op. 25: song (voice and piano) for the comedy by Georges Neveux, lyrics by Georges Neveux, Paris, Théâtre de l'Avenue, 8 March 1930, directed by Alberto Cavalcanti;
- Chants de la Côte (1925) «Popular Songs from Provence and Nice county» harmonized for one voice and piano;
- Cinq danses de l'Amazone "sur des thèmes indiens", op. 28A (1930) : for orchestra, from his score for Au Pays du Scalp, a documentary film by and about Robert de Wavrin;
- Le jour op.30 (1931) : choreographic poem for symphony orchestra based on an argument that Jules Supervielle wrote for Jaubert about the night sky, the appearance of the Sun, and the awakening of life. First performance on December 13, Salle Pleyel, with Pierre Monteux and the Orchestre Symphonique de Paris.;
- Little Red Riding Hood" (French: Le Petit Chaperon Rouge) op. 32A (1931) : burlesque suite for 12 instruments, from his score for Alberto Cavalcanti's film on a scenario by Cavalcanti and Jean Renoir;
- Quatorze Juillet op. 35 (1933) : suite of dances for piano based on his score for René Clair's film;
- Suite française op. 36 (1933) : for orchestra, from his music for Jean Lods's film La Vie d’un Fleuve (about the river Seine). First performed in Saint-Louis, USA, by its dedicatee, Vladimir Golschmann;
- Ode à la Montagne op. 38A (1933) : for men's choir and orchestra, from his score for Henri Storck's film Trois Vies et une Corde;
- Deus Abraham op. 42 (1934) : a short motet written for the wedding mass of Maurice Thiriet;
- Ballade also known as Symphonie de Lewis op. 44B (1934), and Chanson de Tessa for Tessa, a play adapted from Margaret Kennedy's novel The Constant Nymph by Jean Giraudoux, directed by Louis Jouvet. Théâtre de l'Athénée, November 14, 1934;
- Nativité op. 46 (1935) : cantata for soprano, tenor, baritone and bass soli, choir and orchestra on liturgical texts;
- Cantate pour le Temps Pascal (Easter cantata) op. 47, 1935, for soloists, choir, and orchestra, which closed the March 24, 1938 concert at Salle Pleyel. Charles Munch conducted. Includes 'Alleluia: on a Gregorian theme' op. 47A ;
- La guerre de Troie n'aura pas lieu op. 52 : music for Jean Giraudoux's play. Paris, Théâtre de l'Athénée, directed by Louis Jouvet, November 21, 1935;
- Trio italien, op. 54 (1935) : for violin, viola and cello;
- Intermèdes op. 55, 1936, for string orchestra;
- Sonate a due op. 56, 1936 : for violon, cello and string orchestra;
- Quartier nègre, Op. 57: Quartier nègre, Panama Canal: music for the play by Georges Simenon, Brussels, Royal Saint-Hubert Galleries, 9 December 1936, voice and piano;
- Concert flamand op. 58A, 1938 : for orchestra, based on his score for Henri Storck's film Regards sur la Belgique Ancienne. The score featured melodies by a number of early composers (Dufay, Lassus, Ockeghem, Josquin des Prés, etc.);
- Normandie op. 59 (1935) : ballet in one act, scenario by Éric Hurel about the launch of the liner Normandie;
- Jeanne d'Arc op. 61 (1937) : a ‘symphonie concertante’ for soprano, choir and orchestra to a text by Charles Péguy first performed on June 9, 1937 at the Théâtre des Champs-Elysées by the Orchestre symphonique de Paris;
- L'ombre, op. 62 : ballet in one act and 4 tableaux based on the fairy tale by Hans Christian Andersen, scenario by Maurice Jaubert;
- Géographies op. 66, 1937, suite for mixed choir and orchestra (Polynésie, Cyclades, Côte d'Ivoire, Equateur, Amazonie), based on his scores for Au Pays du Scalp, Île de Pâques and En Crète sans les Dieux (by René Zuber and Roger Leenhardt), broadcast on the radio on Oct 22, 1938 (Orchestre national, Manuel Rosenthal);
- Comédie de la soif (poem by Arthur Rimbaud), voice and piano;
- Proses op. 68, 1938 : pour mixed choir and orchestra : Languentibus..., Inviolata..., Veni, Sancte Spiritus;
- L'Eau vive op. 69, 1938, five work songs from Upper Provence for baritone based on poems by Jean Giono. It was first performed on January 23, 1939, by baritone Martial Singher, with the composer at the piano, during a concert organized by Le Triton at the École Normale.;
- Caprice italien op. 73, 1938 : concerto for string orchestra (based on op. 54)
- Deux ballades de Charles d'Orléans : Complainte de France, Ballade sur la paix, op. 76 : for a capella mixed choir;
- Two songs by Victor Hugo, op. 80, for voice and piano: La chanson du spectre (from Toute la Lyre), La chanson de Gacquoil le marin (from Les Années Funestes). Dedicated to Agnès Capri. 9 July 1985, Paris, Festival du Marais;
- Ô mes Frères Perdus, composed in November–December 1938, first performed at the Théâtre des Mathurins, June 30, 1941, on two poems by Paul Eluard from Cours naturel (1938) : Novembre 1936 (dedicated to Rafael Alberti) ; Sans âge (to Gustavo Pittaluga). For men’s choir and piano;
- Saisir, op. 88, 1939-1940 : Suite pour soprano, string orchestra, harp and piano, on poems by Jules Supervielle; there is also a reduction for voice and piano;
- Le bon mari, op. 86: words by Gaultier-Garguille (1632) for voice and piano. Dedicated to Marta Eggerth.
- Chansons: words by François de Maucroix (1619-1708), voice and piano;
- Trois Psaumes pour le temps de guerre op. 89, 1940 (Ps. XC Celui qui habite / 91 Whoever dwells ; Ps. XCIII Dieu de vengeance /94 The LORD is a God who avenges ; Ps. CXLIII O Dieu, je chanterai pour toi /144 I will sing a new song) for women's choir, harp and piano. Dedicated to Patrice de La Tour du Pin.

== Filmography ==
- 1926: Nana by Jean Renoir
- 1929: Die wunderbare Lüge der Nina Petrowna (The Lie of Nina Petrovna) by Hanns Schwarz
- 1930: Le Petit Chaperon rouge (Little Red Riding Hood) by Alberto Cavalcanti
- 1931: La Vie d'un fleuve, la Seine (The life of a river, the Seine) short feature documentary by Jean Lods
- 1931: Au pays du scalp (documentary) by Robert de Wavrin
- 1932: L'affaire est dans le sac (It's in the Bag) by Pierre Prévert
- 1933: L'Homme mystérieux (The mysterious man) short feature by Maurice Tourneur
- 1933: Quatorze Juillet (Bastille Day) by René Clair. Includes the song "A Paris, dans chaque faubourg"
- 1933: Zéro de conduite (Zero for Conduct) by Jean Vigo
- 1933: Mirages de Paris by Fedor Ozep
- 1934: L'Île de Pâques (Easter Island) documentary by John Fernhout and Henri Storck
- 1934: L'Atalante by Jean Vigo
- 1934: Le dernier milliardaire (The Last Billionaire) by René Clair
- 1935: Justin de Marseille (Justin from Marseille) by Maurice Tourneur (orchestra conducting)
- 1936: Mayerling by Anatole Litvak
- 1936: Barbe-Bleue op. 49 (Bluebeard, "a short film opera based on the tale by Perrault". Music for soloists, choir and orchestra for the first ever animated film using plastilin figures, by Jean Painlevé and René Bertrand, libretto by Jean Vincent-Bréchignac, France, 1936-1938
- 1936: La Vie parisienne (Life in Paris) by Robert Siodmak
- 1937: We Live in Two Worlds short feature documentary by Alberto Cavalcanti
- 1937: Un carnet de bal (A dance card) by Julien Duvivier. Includes ‘Valse grise’
- 1937: Drôle de drame (Strange drama) by Marcel Carné
- 1938: Les Filles du Rhône (The Girls of the Rhône) by Jean-Paul Paulin
- 1938: Le Quai des brumes (Port of Shadows) by Marcel Carné
- 1938: Altitude 3.200 (At an altitude of 3,200 metres) by Jean Benoît-Lévy and Marie Epstein
- 1938: Hôtel du Nord by Marcel Carné
- 1939: Violons d'Ingres (Hobbies) short feature by Jacques B. Brunius
- 1939: L'esclave blanche (The White Slave) by Marc Sorkin and Georg Wilhelm Pabst
- 1939: La Fin du jour (At the close of the day) by Julien Duvivier
- 1939: Le jour se lève (The break of day) by Marcel Carné

Maurice Jaubert played a small role as an orchestra conductor in La Nuit de décembre by Kurt Bernhardt, produced in 1939.

== Discography ==
Except for soundtracks on films, this mainly consists of posthumously recorded music.

- Ballade - Orchestre Symphonique conducted by Jaubert (recorded 2 November 1934)
- In 1943 three movements from his Intermède pour orchestre à cordes, Op. 55 (Ouverture, Forlane, Musique de nuit) were recorded by the Orchestre Marius-François Gaillard
- Georges Delerue conducts the film music of Maurice Jaubert : Le Jour se lève, L'Atalante, Le petit chaperon rouge, Un carnet de bal, Le Quai des brumes, Madrid Symphony Orchestra, Disques Cinémusique DCM 110 (recorded live in 1986, P 2003). Online presentation.
- Maurice Jaubert - L'Atalante, Quai des brumes et autres musiques de films : also includes excerpts from Zéro de conduite, 14 juillet and L'île de Pâques. Orchestras conducted by Patrice Mestral and Serge Baudo. Milan CD CH 274.
- Suite Française, Intermèdes and other Orchestral Works by l'Orchestre de chambre de Nice conducted by Jacques-Francis Manzone. Also includes piano pieces performed by Yoko Sawai, Disques Cinémusique Classique, recorded in 1989 and 2009, P 2009). Online presentation.
- 25 ans de musique de cinéma français, orchestra conducted by Serge Baudo : Excerpts from film music scores, movie songs and piano pieces performed by par Yoko Sawai, Disques Cinémusique DCM 122, (recorded in 1956 and 2009, P 2009). One third of the program is devoted to Maurice Jaubert. Online presentation.
- Concert Maurice Jaubert (2 CD) : Ballade, Trois psaumes pour le temps de guerre, Jeanne d'Arc, Géographies, Cantate pour le temps pascal. Choeur et orchestre national de la RTF conducted by Jean Martinon. Jacqueline Brumaire, soprano. Restored and edited version of a 1952 live recording, Disques Cinémusique Classique (P 2017). Presentation online.
- A few of his songs have been recorded, by Paul Derenne, and Felicity Lott : Saisir, Trois Sérénades, Elpénor, Chants Sahariens.
