= Journey into Medicine =

1947 film

- Directed by: Willard Van Dyke
- Written by: Irving Jacoby
- Starring: James Karen
- Narrated by: Tony Kraber
- Cinematography: Boris Kaufman
- Edited by: Aram Boyajian
- Music by: Henry Brant
- Production company: United States Information Service
- Distributed by: U.S. Department of State
- Release date: 1947
- Running time: 40 minutes
- Country: United States
- Language: English

Journey into Medicine is a 1947 American documentary-style film. The film stars James Karen as Michael Kenneth Marshall, a young medical student who goes through medical training at Columbia and Cornell. During his internship in pediatrics, Marshall loses one of his patients, a young girl to diphtheria. This case inspires him to enroll in the Johns Hopkins School of Public Health and pursue a career in public health. While studying at Johns Hopkins, Marshall helps battle an outbreak of diphtheria in Baltimore, which confirms to him his chosen vocation.

The film was made by the United States Information Service for use by the U.S. State Department. The film was meant to be shown outside the United States as a promotional film for American medicine and public health efforts abroad.

The film was nominated for an Academy Award for Best Documentary Feature. The Academy Film Archive preserved Journey into Medicine in 2011. The film is part of the Academy War Film Collection, one of the largest collections of World War II era short films held outside government archives.
