= Maryline Desbiolles =

French novelist

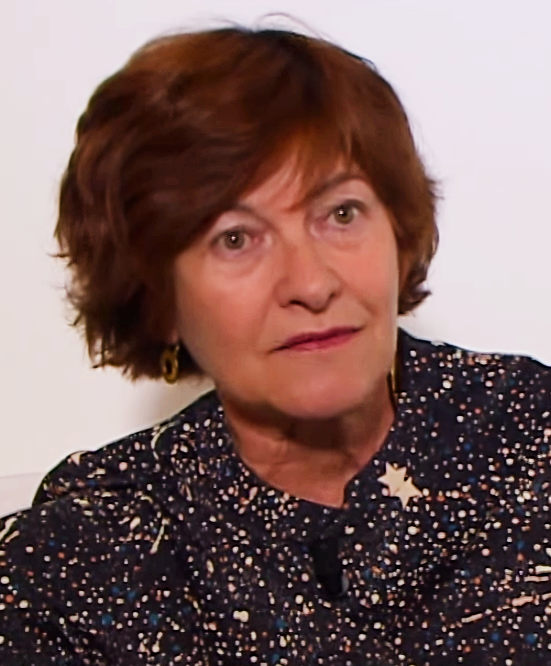
- Maryline Desbiolles in 2015
- Born: 21 May 1959 (age 67); Ugine, Savoie, France
- Writing career
- Language: French
- Notable work: Anchise
- Notable awards: Prix Femina

Maryline Desbiolles (French pronunciation: [maʁilin debjɔl]; born 21 May 1959 in Ugine, Savoie) is a French writer and winner of the Prix Femina, 1999, for Anchise.

== Books ==
- The Cuttlefish (Herodius, Inc., New York, 2001)
- Le Beau Temps (Éd. Seuil, 2015, in French, about the composer Maurice Jaubert)
