= We Live in Two Worlds =

We Live In Two Worlds
- Directed by: Alberto Cavalcanti
- Written by: Alberto Cavalcanti; Stuart Legg
- Starring: J. B. Priestley
- Cinematography: John Taylor
- Edited by: Richard McNaughton
- Music by: Maurice Jaubert
- Production company: GPO Film Unit
- Release date: 1937
- Running time: 29 minutes
- Country: United Kingdom
- Language: English

We Live In Two Worlds is a 1937 filmed talk by British writer J. B. Priestley, in which he expounds on the benefits of cross-border trade and communications, contrasting such commerce with the military preoccupations of individual nations. The film was directed by Alberto Cavalcanti, the second of seven that the writer and director made for the Swiss telephone company Pro Telephone Zurich between 1936 and 1939.
