= Catherine Dasté =

French actress (1929–2026)

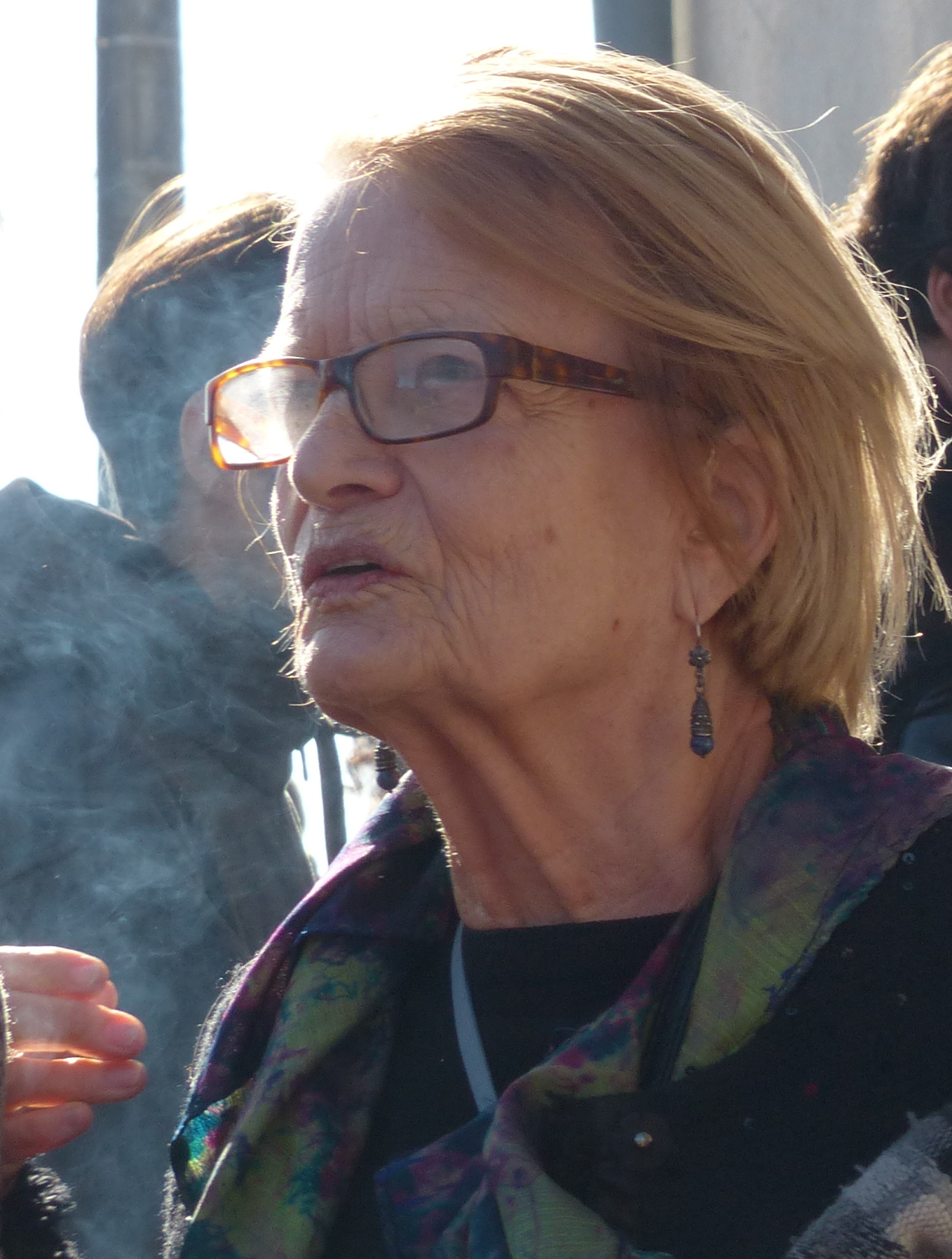
- Dasté in 2014
- Born: 6 October 1929; Beaune, France
- Died: 6 August 2026 (aged 96); Ivry-sur-Seine, France
- Occupation: Actress

Catherine Dasté French: [katʁˈin dastˈe]; 6 October 1929 – 6 August 2026) was a French stage actress.

== Life and career ==
Born in Beaune on 6 October 1929, Dasté was the daughter of actor Jean Dasté and actress Marie-Hélène Dasté. She studied dramatic art at The Old Vic in London and married Graeme Allwright, with whom she had three sons: Christophe, Jacques, and Nicolas. In 1959, the family joined the Comédie de Saint-Étienne. From 1985 to 1992, she was director of the Théâtre des Quartiers d'Ivry. With the support of Françoise Dolto, she created the first national drama center for children at the Théâtre de Sartrouville et des Yvelines. In 2010, she was a guest of honor at Oulipo. In the community, she was a supporter of the Contes Givrés de Bourgogne festival. In 2025, an exhibition was put on by Sorbonne Nouvelle University to "shed new light" on the impact she had on French theatre.

Catherine Dasté died in Ivry-sur-Seine on 6 August 2026, at the age of 96.
