= Zero for Conduct =

Zéro de conduite
- 1946 re-release poster by Jean Colin
- Directed by: Jean Vigo
- Written by: Jean Vigo
- Produced by: Jean Vigo
- Starring: Jean Dasté
- Cinematography: Boris Kaufman
- Edited by: Jean Vigo
- Music by: Maurice Jaubert
- Production company: Argui-Films
- Distributed by: Gaumont; Comptoir Français de Distribution de Films Franfilmdis
- Release date: 7 April 1933
- Running time: 48 minutes
- Country: France
- Language: French
- Budget: ₣200,000

Zero for Conduct (French: Zéro de conduite) is a 1933 French featurette directed by Jean Vigo. It was first shown on 7 April 1933 and was subsequently banned in France until November 1945.

The film draws extensively on Vigo's boarding school experiences to depict a repressive and bureaucratised educational establishment in which surreal acts of rebellion occur, reflecting Vigo's anarchist view of childhood. The title refers to a mark the boys would get which prevented them from going out on Sundays.

Though the film was not an immediate success with audiences, it has proven to be enduringly influential. François Truffaut paid homage to Zero for Conduct in his film The 400 Blows (1959). The anarchic classroom and recess scenes in Truffaut's film borrow from Vigo's film, as does a classic scene in which a mischievous group of schoolboys are led through the streets by one of their schoolmasters. Director Lindsay Anderson has acknowledged that his own film If.... (1968) was inspired by Zero for Conduct.

== Plot ==
Four rebellious young boys at a repressive French boarding school plot and execute a revolt against their teachers and take over the school. The film opens by showing the joyful, carefree nature of childhood as two boys (Caussat and Colin) returning to boarding school on the train enjoy playing pranks on each other and their fellow travelers. Back on campus, they are reprimanded by the school teachers and staff who inflict severe punishments on them and deprive them of their freedom and creativity. Three of the youngest of the protagonists: Caussaut (the leader), Colin (the cook’s son), and Bruel are singled out and form a bond of friendship over their shared defiance of the school’s strict rules and absurd punishments.

As the school term progresses, the boys engage in various pranks and acts of rebellion, including disrupting classes and mocking their overseers. They are encouraged, however by the support of a new class supervisor, Huguet, who is closer to the age and mentality of the young students and sympathizes with them, taking them out into the town for some fun. Adept at imitating Charlie Chaplin, Huguet shows himself capable of doing a handstand on a desk in the middle of the enthusiastic boys. Another class supervisor, quite different from Huguet, puts an end to this chaotic fun and punishes the boys with another zero for conduct, meaning they will not be permitted to leave the school on Sundays. The boys determine to plot a rebellion at the recently announced celebration to honor important alumni and visitors. Emboldened by their plans for revolution, the boys stage a food fight at the cafeteria in protest of the bad food. Unwanted attention from the science teacher provokes Tabard, a very young protagonist with delicate and effeminate features, to talk back rudely.

In the dormitory, the boys begin their revolt by raising their skull and crossbones flag, tying up the supervising teacher snoozing in his bed, instigating a pillow fight, and marching around in their nightshirts. The action reaches its peak on the day of the school festival. The four boys implement their plan to revolt, during which the celebration’s decorations and exhibitions are destroyed and the guests scattered as tin cans and other garbage is thrown down at them. The four boys triumphantly mount the rooftops, marching towards the serene skies that guarantee their newfound freedom.

== Cast ==
- Gérard de Bédarieux – Tabard
- Louis Lefebvre – Caussat
- Gilbert Pruchon – Colin
- Coco Golstein – Bruel
- Jean Dasté – Surveillant Huguet
- Robert le Flon – Surveillant Pète-Sec
- Du Verron – Surveillant-Général Bec-de-Gaz (as du Verron)
- Delphin – Principal du Collège
- Léon Larive – Professeur (as Larive)
- Madame Émile – Mère Haricot (as Mme. Emile)
- Louis de Gonzague – Préfet (as Louis de Gonzague-Frick)
- Raphaël Diligent – Pompier (as Rafa Diligent)

== Production ==
In late 1932, Vigo and his wife Lydou Vigo were both in poor health and Vigo was at a low point in his career. He then met and befriended Jacques-Louis Nounez, a rich businessman who was interested in making films. Vigo discussed the idea of a film about his childhood experiences at a Millau boarding school and Nounez agreed to finance it.

Zero for Conduct was shot from December 1932 until January 1933 with a budget of 200,000 francs. Vigo used mostly non-professional actors and sometimes people that he found on the street. The four main characters are all based on real people that Vigo had known in his youth. Caussat and Bruel were based on friends from Millau, Colin was based on a friend he had known in Chartes and Tabard was based on Vigo himself. The teachers depicted in the film were based on the guards at La Petite Roquette juvenile prison where Vigo's father Miguel Almereyda had once been an inmate. The film's soundtrack was of poor quality due to budgetary constraints but Vigo's use of poetic, rhythmic dialogue has been said to make it much easier to understand what characters are saying. At one point in the film, Tabard tells his teachers "shit on you!", which was once a famous headline in a French newspaper that Vigo's father had directed at all world governments. Vigo's poor health became worse during the film's production but he was able to complete the editing.

== Reception ==
The film was first screened on April 7, 1933, in Paris. The premiere shocked many audience members who hissed and booed Vigo. Other audience members, most notably Jacques Prevert, loudly clapped.

French film critics were strongly divided about the film. Some called it "simply ridiculous" and compared it to "lavatory flushing" while others praised its "fiery daring" and called Vigo "the Céline of the cinema." The film's most vocal critics included a French Catholic journal which called it a scatological work by "an obsessed maniac." Zero for Conduct was quickly banned in France, with some believing that the French Ministry of the Interior considered it a threat capable of "creating disturbances and hindering the maintenance of order."

=== Rediscovery ===
Like all of Vigo's work, Zero for Conduct first began to be rediscovered in about 1945 when a revival screening of his films was organized. Since then, its reputation has grown and it has influenced such films as François Truffaut's The 400 Blows (1959) and Lindsay Anderson's if.... (1968). Truffaut praised the film and said that "in one sense Zero de Conduite represents something more rare than L'Atalante because the masterpieces consecrated to childhood in literature or cinema can be counted on the fingers of one hand. They move us doubly since the esthetic emotion is compounded by a biographical, personal and intimate emotion ... They bring us back to our short pants, to school, to the blackboard, to vacations, to our beginnings in life."

== Style and themes ==
Vigo's biographer Paulo Emílio Salles Gomes has discussed Vigo's "extreme sensitivity to anything concerning a child's vulnerability in the adult world" and his "respect for children and their feelings."

Gomes also compared the boarding school in the film to a microcosm of the world, stating that "the division to the children and adults inside the school corresponds to the division of society into classes outside: a strong minority imposing its will on a weak majority."

Hodson shows how Vigo's film aligns "surrealist poetry" with "anarchist pedagogy," offering the audience a special kind of experience which he call a "magical transformation of mundane space" This is attributed to his lack of experience in filmmaking that opened up a space of creative freedom for his directing. Difficulties recording the dialogue forced Vigo to ignore the conventions of building the film's narrative; instead the apparent disorganization of the shots reflects Vigo's penchant for anarchism in the integration of his personal experience in a boarding school.

== Awards ==
The 2011 Parajanov-Vartanov Institute Award posthumously honoured Jean Vigo's Zero for Conduct and was presented to his daughter and French film critic Luce Vigo by the actor Jon Voight. Martin Scorsese wrote a letter for the occasion, with praise for Vigo, Sergei Parajanov and Mikhail Vartanov, all of whom struggled with heavy censorship.

== Bibliography ==
- "Zéro de Conduite", L'Avant-Scène du Cinéma (21): 1–28, 1962 (includes complete script)
- Gomes, P. E. Salles (1998). Jean Vigo. Paris: Editions du Seuil, 1957. ISBN 0-571-19610-1.
- Insdorf, Annette (1978). François Truffaut. Cambridge University Press. ISBN 0-521-47808-1.
- Le Cain, Maximilian. "Jean Vigo". Senses of Cinema. Archived from the original on 5 February 2007.
- Temple, Michael (2011). Jean Vigo. Manchester University Press. ISBN 9780719056338.
- Wakeman, John (1987). World Film Directors, Volume 1, 1890–1945. New York: The H. W. Wilson Company, 1987. ISBN 978-0-82420-757-1.
- Weir, David (2014). Jean Vigo and the Anarchist Eye. Atlanta: On Our Own Authority!. ISBN 978-0990641810.
