= Romain Cogitore =

French film director, screenwriter and photographer

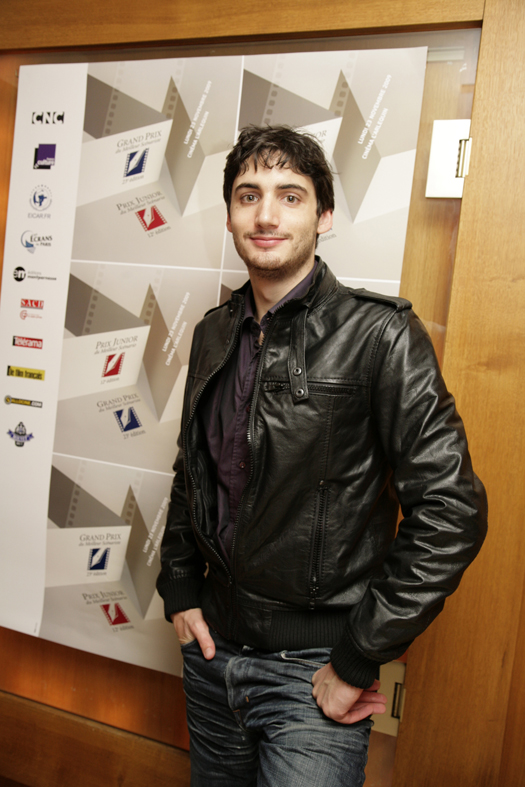
- Cogitore in 2009
- Born: 2 February 1985 (age 41); Alsace, France
- Occupations: Film director; screenwriter; photographer
- Years active: 2000–present
- Relatives: Clément Cogitore (brother)

Romain Cogitore (born 2 February 1985) is a French film director, screenwriter and photographer. He wrote and directed the films 15 Lads (2011), Territory of Love (2018), and A Place to Fight For (2023).

== Early life ==
Cogitore was born on 2 February 1985 in Alsace, France. His older brother, Clément Cogitore, is also a film director.

== Career ==
Cogitore wrote and directed the feature films 15 Lads (2011), Territory of Love (2018), and A Place to Fight For (2023). He is also a photographer.

He was a member of the Caméra d'Or jury at the 2021 Cannes Film Festival.

== Filmography ==
=== As director ===
Year	Title	Credited as		Notes			
Year	Title	Director	Screenwriter	Notes			
Year	Title	2000	Nettoyeurs	Notes	Yes	Yes	Short film
Year	Title	2001	Nicotine	Notes	Yes	Yes	Short film
Year	Title	2002	Draculine	Notes	Yes	Yes	Short film
Year	Title	2002	À ma façon	Notes	Yes	Yes	Short film
Year	Title	2004	Les Routes	Notes	Yes	Yes	Short film, documentary
Year	Title	2004	Das Bild	Notes	Yes	Yes	Documentary
Year	Title	2005	Concerto	Notes	Yes	Yes	Short film
Year	Title	2008	Des hommes	Notes	Yes	Yes	Short film
Year	Title	2011	15 Lads (Nos Résistances)	Notes	Yes	Yes	First feature film
Year	Title	2018	Art Stories: Monuments with Soul	Notes	Yes	No	Documentary TV series, episode "Elegant Gardens"
Territory of Love (L'Autre continent)	Yes	2018	Yes				
2022	Last Mountain (Dernière montagne)	Yes	Yes				
2023	A Place to Fight For (Une zone à défendre)	Yes	Yes				

=== As assistant director ===
Year	Title	Notes	Ref.
Year	2006	Des gens dans mon lit	Short film, first assistant director
Year	2006	Chroniques	Short film, first assistant director
Year	2007	Vermilion Souls	First assistant director
Year	2007	Le haori de soie mauve	Short film, first assistant director
Year	2007	Visités	Short film, first assistant director
Year	2007	Weekend in the Countryside (Week-end à la campagne)	Short film, first assistant director
Year	2007	Un bisou pour le monde	Short film, first assistant director
Year	2007	Dans leur peau	Short film, first assistant director
Comme un chien dans une église	2007		Short film, first assistant director

=== As actor ===
Year	Title	Role	Director	Notes
2013	Agit Pop	Fabien	Nicolas Pariser	

== Awards and nominations ==
Year	Award	Category	Work	Result	Ref.
2006	CNC Trophy	First Screenplay, Promising New Talents	15 Lads	Won	
2009	Grand Prix du Meilleur Scénariste	Junior Prize for Best Screenplay – Special Mention from the Jury	15 Lads	Won	
2012	SACD Beaumarchais Award	Best Script	Territory of Love	Won	
2016	TorinoFilmLab	Script & Pitch	A Place to Fight For	Nominated	
2016	Fondation Gan	—N/a	A Place to Fight For	Nominated	
2013	Grand Prix du Meilleur Scénariste	Junior Prize for Best Screenplay	Territory of Love	Nominated	
2019	Tübingen-Stuttgart French Film Festival	Grand Prix - International Competition	Territory of Love	Won	
2022	Autrans Mountain Film Festival	Documentary Jury Prize - Prix Vie des Hommes	Last Mountain	Won	
