= Jean Taris =

French swimmer

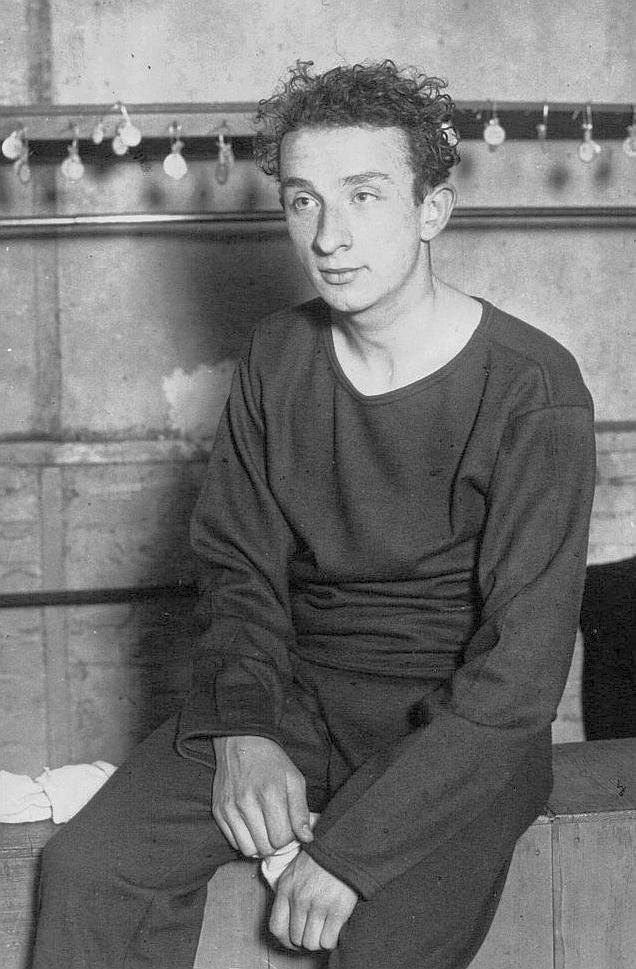
- Taris in 1929

Personal information
- Full name: Jean Charles Émile Taris
- Born: 6 July 1909 Versailles, France
- Died: 10 January 1977 (aged 67) Grasse, France
- Height: 1.78 m (5 ft 10 in)

Sport
- Sport: Swimming
- Club: SCUF, Paris; CN Paris
Medal record
Representing France
Olympic Games
Silver medal – second place	1932 Los Angeles	400 m freestyle
European Championships
Silver medal – second place	1931 Paris	400 m freestyle
Gold medal – first place	1934 Magdeburg	400 m freestyle
Gold medal – first place	1934 Magdeburg	1500 m freestyle

Jean Charles Émile Taris (6 July 1909 – 10 January 1977) was a French swimmer who competed at the 1928, 1932 and 1936 Summer Olympics.

In 1928, he was eliminated in the heats of the 4×200 m freestyle relay and 1500 m freestyle. In 1932 he won a silver medal in the 400 m freestyle, 0.1 seconds behind Buster Crabbe, and finished sixth in the 1500 m freestyle. In 1936 he placed fourth in the 4×200 m freestyle relay and sixth in the 400 m freestyle.

Taris was the subject of Jean Vigo's short film Jean Taris, Swimming Champion in 1930. He won two European titles in 1934, and finished second in the 400 m freestyle in 1931, 0.2 seconds behind István Bárány. In 1984 he was inducted into the International Swimming Hall of Fame. During his career Taris set 7 world and 49 national records, and won 34 national titles. He won the Seine river 8 km race four times.

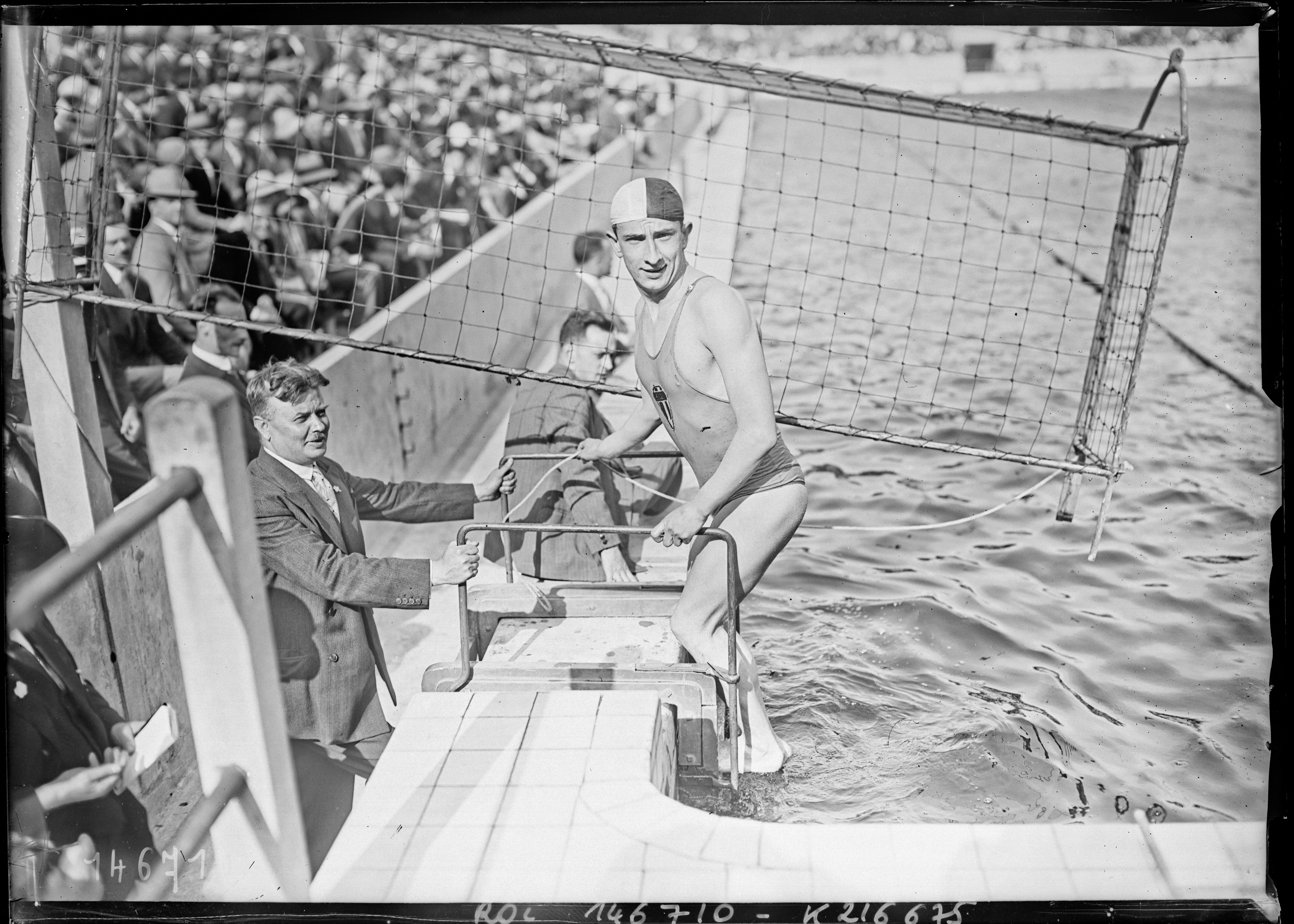
Jean Taris after his 1000 m at Piscine des Tourelles, June 8, 1930

== See also ==
- List of members of the International Swimming Hall of Fame
- World record progression 400 metres freestyle
- World record progression 800 metres freestyle
