= L'Atalante =

1934 French film by Jean Vigo

- Theatrical release poster
- Directed by: Jean Vigo
- Screenplay by: Jean Vigo; Albert Riéra
- Story by: Jean Guinée
- Produced by: Jacques-Louis Nounez
- Starring: Michel Simon; Dita Parlo; Jean Dasté
- Cinematography: Boris Kaufman
- Edited by: Louis Chavance
- Music by: Maurice Jaubert
- Production company: Argui-Films
- Distributed by: Gaumont
- Release dates: 25 April 1934 (Preview); 12 September 1934 (Initial release)
- Running time: 65 minutes (original French release); 85 minutes (restored version)
- Country: France
- Language: French
- Budget: FF1 million

L'Atalante, also released as Le Chaland qui passe (English: The Passing Barge), is a 1934 French film written and directed by Jean Vigo, and starring Jean Dasté, Dita Parlo, and Michel Simon.

After the difficult release of his controversial 1933 short film Zero for Conduct, Vigo initially wanted to make a film about the French anarchist and illegalist Eugène Dieudonné, with whom Vigo's father (anarchist Miguel Almereyda) had been associated in 1913. After Vigo and his producer Jacques-Louis Nounez struggled to find the right project for a feature film, Nounez finally gave Vigo an unproduced screenplay by Jean Guinée about barge dwellers. Vigo re-wrote the story with Albert Riéra, while Nounez secured a distribution deal with Gaumont with a budget of FF 1 million. Vigo used many of the technicians and actors who worked with him on Zero for Conduct, such as cinematographer Boris Kaufman and actor Jean Dasté.

It has been hailed by many critics as one of the greatest films of all time.

== Plot ==
Jean, the captain of the canal barge L'Atalante, marries Juliette in her village. They choose to live aboard the barge with Jean's eccentric crew, Père Jules and the cabin boy. As they travel to Paris to deliver cargo, they enjoy an impromptu honeymoon. Jules and the cabin boy, unaccustomed to having a woman on board, cause tension when Jean finds Juliette and Jules talking in Jules' quarters. In a jealous outburst, Jean smashes plates and scatters Jules' many cats.

In Paris, Jean promises Juliette a night out, but Jules and the cabin boy leave to see a fortune teller, leaving Juliette disappointed since Jean cannot leave the barge unattended. Later, Jean takes Juliette to a dance hall, where a street peddler flirts with her, dances with her, and invites her to run away with him. A confrontation with Jean ensues, and he drags Juliette back to the barge. Still craving Parisian nightlife, Juliette sneaks off to explore the city. When Jean discovers she is gone, he angrily sets sail, leaving her behind.

Juliette spends the day window shopping, unaware Jean has already left. When she returns to find the barge gone, she tries to buy a train ticket to follow it but is robbed of her purse. Forced to find work, Juliette eventually makes her way to Le Havre to meet the barge, though the details of her journey remain unclear.

Meanwhile, Jean regrets his actions and falls into a deep depression. He is called by his company's manager, but Jules prevents him from losing his job. Jean recalls a folk tale Juliette told him about seeing the face of one's true love in water. He attempts to replicate it, first dunking his head in a bucket, then jumping into the river. Deciding to search for Juliette, Jules finds her in a store. They return to the barge, where the couple is joyfully reunited.

== Cast ==
- Michel Simon as Père Jules
- Dita Parlo as Juliette
- Jean Dasté as Jean
- Gilles Margaritis as Le camelot (the peddler)
- Louis Lefebvre as Le gosse (the cabin boy)
- Maurice Gilles as Le chef de bureau (the manager of the waterways company)
- Raphaël Diligent as Raspoutine, a scrap dealer who sells Jules trinkets
- René Bleck as Le garçon d'honneur (Jean's best man, uncredited)
- Fanny Clar as La mère de Juliette (Juliette's mother, uncredited)
- Charles Goldblatt as Le voleur (the thief, uncredited)
- Glen Paul as L'invité qui boite (a wedding guest with a limp, uncredited)
- Jacques Prévert as an extra
- Pierre Prévert as an extra
- Loutchimoukov as an extra

== Production ==
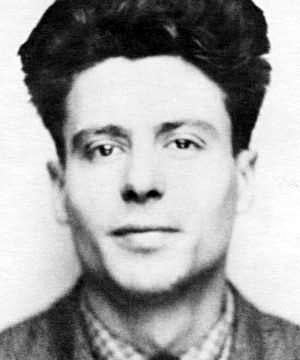
Jean Vigo

=== Background and writing ===
While finishing work on Zero for Conduct, producer Jacques-Louis Nounez was interested in working with Vigo on a feature. Vigo suggested they work on a prison film about French anarchist Eugène Dieudonné, whom Vigo's father Miguel Almereyda had defended in a newspaper article in 1913. Vigo began working on the film with Dieudonné, who had agreed to play himself, and Julot Dupont, an expert on French prisons. After Zero for Conduct was banned in France for its controversial depiction of the French education system, Nounez was worried that such a film could not be distributed. Other ideas for films considered by Nounez and Vigo include an adaptation of Georges de La Fouchardière's L'Affaire Peau-de-Balle, and a script Vigo had written about the relationship between a bourgeois father and his more progressive son. In July 1933, Nounez finally gave Vigo a scenario about "barge dwellers" called L'Atalante, written by Jean Guinée. In the early 1930s, films and music about "barge dwellers" were popular in France and had inspired such pop songs as "Chanson de halage" and "Le chaland qui passe". Vigo initially disliked the scenario, but finally agreed to make the film and began making suggestions for the story.

Nounez produced the film for ₣1 million and made a deal with Gaumont to provide studio sets and distribute the film. Vigo hired people he frequently collaborated with, such as cinematographer Boris Kaufman, composer Maurice Jaubert, and art director Francis Jourdain, who was an old friend of his father. Kaufman, the brother of Soviet filmmaker Dziga Vertov, described his years working with Vigo as "cinematic paradise." Vigo also hired established film editor Louis Chavance after he found it difficult to edit Zero for Conduct himself. Chavance had attended the premiere of Zero for Conduct and had been one of its early supporters and quickly became friends with Vigo. Vigo and Albert Riéra quickly wrote a shooting script and scouted locations at docks during the summer of 1933. They also found and leased Louise XVI, the barge used for the film.

=== Casting ===
Vigo worked with established movie stars for the first time, who were hired by Gaumont but approved of by Vigo. Michel Simon had been a lead actor after appearing in the title role of Jean Renoir's Boudu Saved from Drowning (1932). Simon stated that he accepted the role for the little-known and already controversial Vigo because he sympathized with Vigo and wanted to help his troubled career. Dita Parlo was a minor star who had just returned to France after six years in Germany. Jean Dasté had only appeared in Zero for Conduct and Boudu Saved from Drowning before his lead role, but went on to have a long career in France. Louis Lefèbvre had previously appeared in Zero for Conduct. Vigo was familiar with Lefèbvre's lack of acting training and awkwardness on camera and worked those characteristics into his character in order to make Lefèbvre's performance work.

=== Filming ===
Although scheduled to begin shooting during the summer, production did not begin until mid-November 1933. L'Atalante took four months to shoot, partially in a replica of the barge in a Gaumont studio, and partially on location. During filming, Vigo would often act out the scenes himself for the actors and insisted that they re-shoot scenes until they were perfect.

Amongst the changes that Vigo made to the original script was replacing Père Jules' pet dog with over ten alley cats supplied by the Society for the Prevention of Cruelty to Animals. Vigo's father had been fond of such cats and Vigo's childhood homes were often overrun with stray cats. During the scenes where Père Jules plays his phonograph, the cats would become immediately fascinated by the phonograph and surround it whenever it played music. Vigo quickly assembled his crew and shot footage of the cats listening to the music and sleeping inside the loud speaker. Simon later adopted the kitten that rested inside the phonograph horn. Vigo also visited local flea markets in Saint-Ouen and the scrap metal market on Boulevard Richard-Lenoir to find props for Père Jules' collection of artifacts from around the world.

Jean Dasté and Dita Parlo in the wedding scene, which was the first scene shot.

Production began with the exteriors on location and was shot mostly in sequence. The first scene shot was the wedding sequence at Maurecourt in the Oise. The exteriors of the dance hall sequence where Juliette first meets the showman were shot at the Charentonneau dance hall in Maisons-Alfort, while the interiors were shot on an elaborate set at Gaumont studios. The character of the showman was not very developed in the shooting script and Vigo relied on improvisation on set to create a more interesting character. Because Gaumont had insisted that music be included in the film, the showman sings "The Pedlar's Complaint", a French folk song written by Vigo, Goldblatt and Jaubert that makes fun of the genre of music that they were unwillingly required to include in the film. Vigo had previously experienced bad sound quality when shooting Zero for Conduct and was concerned about a similar problem on L'Atalante despite having better equipment. Since Michel Simon had both the most dialogue in the film and a distinctly inarticulate manner of speech, Vigo had Simon adopt the character trait of repeating questions that were asked of his character.

The first two weeks of location shooting began in the Oise between the Marne and the Rhine and down the Ourcq canal to the basin at La Villette. The harsh and early winter weather slowed down the shooting schedule and affected Vigo's health. Despite the cold weather, Vigo wanted to shoot at night more and more so as to use the artificial lights of the barge and houses along the canal. Vigo also needed to maintain continuity, and the cold weather was creating floating ice in the canal. In the middle of location shooting, Vigo moved the cast and crew to the replica set of the barge at Gaumont studios at La Villette, but would quickly change the day's shooting to on location whenever the weather permitted. Vigo left all transition shots to the very end of shooting, which became a major problem due to the ground then being covered with snow. Vigo shot many low angle shots that only showed the sky in the background to ameliorate this problem.

By mid-January, the film was behind schedule and over budget, with several major sequences having not yet been shot. Gaumont executives blamed Vigo and pressured him to finish the film quickly and inexpensively. Vigo was forced to film documentary-style footage, such as the scene where Juliette walks past a line of real unemployed workers. Despite not having sufficient funding from Gaumont to pay extras or for locations, he was able to film the scene where Juliette is robbed at the Gare d'Austerlitz in the middle of the night with a few friends appearing as background extras. Chavance was also able to recruit members of the "October Group", such as Jacques Prévert, Pierre Prévert and Loutchimoukov, to appear in the film.

=== Vigo's health ===
On location, shooting conditions were often cold and wet, causing Vigo to become ill and develop a fever. He was already suffering from tuberculosis and was bedridden for portions of the filming. Vigo refused to take a break and would often fight with executives at Gaumont over the film. He worked until the film was almost complete and a rough cut had been made.

At the end of four months of continuous shooting, in early February 1934, Vigo took a vacation in Villard-de-Lans with family and friends to try to regain his health. He intended to finish the final cut of the film, but his condition became worse and he returned to Paris to recover. The few remaining aerial shots were done by Boris Kaufman, while editor Louis Chavance finished the final cut without Vigo. Vigo's health did not improve and was confined to his bed for the remainder of his life. Dasté later claimed that Vigo "made jokes all the time. Spending a day with him was wonderful and grueling, even a few weeks before his death. He was such a vivacious person."

== Initial release and reception ==
The film was previewed to French film distributors at the Palais Rochechouart on 25 April 1934. The screening was disastrous and Gaumont took control of the film. Jean Pascal called the original cut "a confused, incoherent, willfully absurd, long, dull, commercially worthless film." However, Élie Faure said that he was reminded of the painter Jean-Baptiste-Camille Corot and praised "these landscapes of water, trees, little houses on peaceful banks and boats slowly threading their way ahead of a silver wake: the same impeccable composition, the same power invisibly present because so much a master of itself, the same balance of all the elements of a visual drama in the tender embrace of complete acceptance, the same pearly, golden veil translucently masking the sharpness of composition and the firmness of line. And perhaps it was the simplicity of composition, entirely devoid of flourishes or decoration — classical, in a word — that made me appreciate all the more pleasure of savoring the very spirit of Vigo's work, almost violent, certainly tormented, feverish, brimming with ideas and truculent fantasy, with virulent, even demonic and yet constantly human romanticism."

Eventually, Gaumont cut the film's run time to 65 minutes in an attempt to make it more popular and changed the title to Le chaland qui passe ("The Passing Barge"), the name of a popular song at the time by Lys Gauty, which was also inserted into the film, replacing parts of Jaubert's score. Vigo was too weak to defend the film as his condition grew worse. When L'Atalante was released in September 1934, it was a commercial failure and received poor reviews from critics, who called it "amateurish, self-indulgent and morbid."

In October 1934, shortly after the film had finished its initial run at French movie theaters, Vigo died at the age of 29 in the arms of his wife Lydou. Allegedly, he died just as a street performer began playing "Le chaland qui passe" below his window.

== Legacy ==
L'Atalante and all of Vigo's work was mostly forgotten by the late 1930s, despite L'Atalante being partially restored in 1940. Vigo's work began to be rediscovered after World War II. L'Atalante and Zero for Conduct were both re-released in New York in July 1947 and received rave reviews from film critics such as James Agee, who called Vigo "one of the very few real originals who have ever worked in film." In the UK, Roger Manvell called Vigo "perhaps the most original and promising of the great French directors." In Italy, Luigi Comencini obtained a personal copy of L'Atalante and would screen it for his friends, calling it "a masterpiece capable of shaking up any notion about cinema the average spectator might have." Film critic Georges Sadoul praised "the astounding quality of poetry it engenders from a world superficially ordinary and drab."

The film became a favorite of the filmmakers of the French New Wave, whose films contain many allusions to Vigo's work. The French director François Truffaut fell in love with it when he saw it at the age of 14 in 1946: "When I entered the theater, I didn't even know who Jean Vigo was. I was immediately overwhelmed with wild enthusiasm for his work." Yugoslavian film director Emir Kusturica has said he is a big admirer of Vigo's work and describes Vigo as a poet. This admiration is best shown in Kusturica's Underground (1995), where the underwater scenes are very reminiscent of those from L'Atalante. Other films to pay tribute to L'Atalante include Bernardo Bertolucci's Last Tango in Paris (1972), Leos Carax's Les Amants du Pont-Neuf (1991), and Jean-Luc Godard's In Praise of Love (2001).

L'Atalante was restored in 1990 for Gaumont by Jean-Louis Bompoint and Pierre Philippe. This restoration was aided in large part by the discovery of a 1934 copy of the film in the British National Film and Television Archive, as well as by rushes and rare material from the French Cinematheque and sequences from a copy of Le Chaland Qui Passe held by the Royal Belgian Cinematheque. In response to criticisms of this restoration, a fifth re-edit was made 2001 by Bernard Eisenchitz and Luce Vigo (the director's daughter) that made some changes and improvements to the 1990 version. The 2001 restoration appears in Criterion's The Complete Jean Vigo; it also appeared on Artificial Eye's UK edition in 2004 and L'intégrale Jean Vigo in 2001. A new 4K restoration was finished in 2017 by Gaumont.

L'Atalante has placed many times in Sight & Sound's decennial greatest films of all time poll. It was first listed in 1962, when it was voted the 10th greatest film by critics. It was not listed in the 1972 and 1982 polls, but it returned in 1992 when the film was ranked 6th in the critics' poll and 5th in the directors' poll. In the 2002 critics' poll it ranked joint 15th. In 2012 the film reached 12th in the critics poll and 22nd in the directors' poll. For the 2022 poll, L'Atalante ranked 34th in the critics' poll and joint 46th in the directors' poll.

In 2010, The Guardian listed L'Atalante as the 3rd best arthouse film of all time.

Musician Steve Adey wrote a song called "Dita Parlo" on his 2012 studio album The Tower of Silence. The song was written in response to L'Atalante.

== See also ==
- List of films with a 100% rating on Rotten Tomatoes, a film review aggregator website

== Bibliography ==
- Gomes, Paulo Emílio Salles (1998) [1957]. Jean Vigo. Paris: Faber and Faber. ISBN 0-571-19610-1.
- Le Cain, Maximilian. "Jean Vigo". Senses of Cinema. Archived from the original on 5 February 2007.
- Temple, Michael (2011). Jean Vigo. Manchester University Press. ISBN 9780719056338.
- Wakeman, John (1987). World Film Directors, Volume 1, 1890–1945. New York: The H. W. Wilson Company, 1987. ISBN 978-0-82420-757-1.
- Weir, David (2014). Jean Vigo and the Anarchist Eye. Atlanta: On Our Own Authority!. ISBN 978-0990641810.
