= Jean Taris, Swimming Champion =

1931 film

- Full film
- Directed by: Jean Vigo
- Written by: Jean Vigo
- Produced by: Jean Vigo
- Starring: Jean Taris
- Cinematography: Boris Kaufman
- Edited by: Jean Vigo
- Release date: 1931
- Running time: 9 minutes
- Country: France
- Language: French

Jean Taris, Swimming Champion (French: La Natation par Jean Taris, champion de France or Taris, roi de l'eau or Taris, champion de natation) is a 1931 French short documentary film directed by Jean Vigo, about the French swimmer Jean Taris. The film is notable for the many innovative techniques that Vigo uses, including close ups, slow motion shots and freeze frames of the swimmer's body.

At the end of 1930, Vigo was commissioned by Gaumont to direct a short film about swimming, centred on the French champion Jean Taris. Most of the film was shot at the Automobile Club de France, where the swimming pool had glass portholes through which underwater shots could be taken.

In the film's 56 shots, Vigo fulfils his commission by concentrating mainly on a demonstration of the crawl. However, he also introduces several unexpected and avant-garde effects, including a woman practising swimming strokes while lying flat on a stool out of the pool, with a life guard in attendance; slow motion underwater shots; a dive and a jump run backwards, so the swimmer flies out of the water; and Taris’s swimsuit dissolving to be replaced by a suit, overcoat and hat, in which he walks across the water.

Although Vigo disliked the final film, he was struck by the underwater shots, especially the strange image of a man's head under water. He reused that image in his later film L'Atalante.

== Bibliography ==
- Gomes, P. E. Salles (1998). Jean Vigo. Paris: Editions du Seuil, 1957. ISBN 0-571-19610-1.
- Le Cain, Maximilian (22 May 2003). "Jean Vigo". Senses of Cinema. Archived from the original on 5 February 2007.
- Temple, Michael (2011). Jean Vigo. Manchester University Press. ISBN 9780719056338.
- Wakeman, John (1987). World Film Directors, Volume 1, 1890–1945. New York: The H. W. Wilson Company, 1987. ISBN 978-0-82420-757-1.
- Weir, David (2014). Jean Vigo and the Anarchist Eye. Atlanta: On Our Own Authority!. ISBN 978-0990641810.
