= 15 Lads =

2011 film by Romain Cogitore

- Theatrical release poster
- French: Nos résistances
- Directed by: Romain Cogitore
- Written by: Romain Cogitore
- Produced by: Tom Dercourt; Sophie Erbs
- Starring: François Civil; Grégoire Colin; Grégory Gatignol; Jules Sitruk; Jules Sadoughi; Ralph Amoussou; Juliette Lamboley; Michel Vuillermoz
- Cinematography: Thomas Ozoux
- Edited by: Nathalie Langlade
- Music by: Julien Lourau
- Production company: Cinéma Defacto
- Distributed by: Shellac Distribution
- Release date: 5 January 2011 (France)
- Running time: 86 min
- Country: France
- Language: French

15 Lads (French: Nos résistances) is a 2011 French World War II drama film written and directed by Romain Cogitore in his feature film directorial debut, inspired by the real-life experiences of his grandfather, Antoine Cogitore, as a French Resistance fighter when he was a teenager. It stars François Civil as a 19-year-old carefree rescuer who joins a group of 15 young men from the French Resistance in 1944. The film was released theatrically in France by Shellac Distribution on 5 January 2011.

For his performance in the film, François Civil was selected as one of the Revelations of the 2012 César Awards and was on the longlist for a pre-nomination for the César Award for Most Promising Actor.

== Cast ==
- François Civil as François/Racine
- Grégoire Colin as Le Bourreau
- Grégory Gatignol as Zozo
- Jules Sitruk as Peigne
- Michel Vuillermoz as Lieutenant Lebel
- Jeanne Mettauer as Jeanne
- Juliette Lamboley as Véronique
- Jules Sadoughi as Ficelle
- Ralph Amoussou as The bear
- Olivier Gueritée as Poux
- Augustin Legrand as Tonio
- Hélène Foubert as Racine's mother
- Bruno Paviot as L'Adjudant
- Maxime Lefrançois as Le Brigadier
- Stéphanie Crayencour as Jeanne's sister
- Anne Benoît as Véronique's mother
- Christopher Buchholz as The german soldier

== Production ==
15 Lads was Romain Cogitore's feature film directorial debut. The film was inspired by the real-life experiences of Cogitore's grandfather, Antoine Cogitore, who was a resistance fighter during World War II in the Maquis of Grande Chartreuse when he was 17 years old. Antoine's voice taken from a conversation between him with the director is featured at the end of the film. "I find his film very good. It was made by a young person for young people. I was overwhelmed, especially when I heard my voice at the end of the film. I didn't know that he had kept an extract of my conversation with him", Antoine said of the film in 2011.

The film was shot in Alsace and Vosges, between August and September 2009.

== Awards and nominations ==
Year	Award	Category	Nominee(s)	Result	Ref.
2006	CNC Trophy	First Screenplay, Promising New Talents	Romain Cogitore	Won	
2009	Grand Prix du Meilleur Scénariste	Junior Prize for Best Screenplay – Special Mention from the Jury	Romain Cogitore	Won	
