= The Armchair =

- Directed by: Missa Hebié
- Written by: Missa Hebié; Noraogo Sawadogo
- Cinematography: Charles Baba Gomina
- Edited by: Bertin B. Bado
- Production company: Faso Films
- Release date: March 2009 (FESPACO)
- Running time: 92 minutes
- Country: Burkina Faso
- Language: French

The Armchair (French: Le fauteuil) is a 2009 Burkinabé film directed by Missa Hebié. It was written by Hebié and Noraogo Sawadogo. It won the Oumarou Ganda Prize at the 21st Panafrican Film and Television Festival of Ouagadougou. It was also screened at the 2009 Pusan International Film Festival in South Korea.

== Cast ==
- Barthélémy Bouda
- Norah Kafando
- Justin Oindida
- Barou O. Ouédraogo
