= Félicien Taris =

French singer (born 1978)

Félicien (born May 13, 1978) is a French singer. He charted in 2002 in France when the single "Cum cum mania" reached No. 1. He also charted in 2003 with the song "Tranquile Emile".

Taris became known from appearing in Season 2 of Loft Story.

== Discography ==
=== Album ===
- 2003 : Olé, Olé

=== Singles ===
- 2002 : Cum-Cum Mania
- 2003 : Tranquille Emile
- 2007 : Mi Casa Es Su Casa (with Los Niños)
- 2009 : Ramaya (with King Félice)
- 2010 : J'ai pas d'argent
- 2012 : Viens squatter
