= Luce Vigo =

French film critic (1931 – 2017)

Luce Vigo (30 June 1931 – 12 February 2017) was a French film critic, programmer and educator. She was the only child of director Jean Vigo (1905 – 1934), and championed the work of her father.

== Biography ==
Luce Vigo lost her parents at a young age. She was raised by the journalist Louis Martin-Chauffier and his wife Simone, and also by Claude Aveline. Aveline was the executor of the will of her father, who died in 1934 when she was only three years old and whom she never had the chance to know. Her mother was Elisabeth "Lydou" Lozinska (1906 – 1939), who married Jean in January 1929.

Luce Vigo became a psychology student, and went to Morocco where she developed an interest in cinema. She was a film critic for L'Humanité, Regards, and Jeune Cinéma, and managed a cinema in Bobigny.

She was the driving force behind the Prix Jean Vigo, awarded annually to a director, and also organised the Épinay Short Film Festival (Rencontres d’Épinay du court métrage).

Vigo married the journalist and film critic Émile Breton. She had five children.

She died in the 19th arrondissement of Paris on 12 February 2017, at the age of 85.

== Publications ==
- Luce Vigo, Émile Breton (dir.), "Le groupe des Trente, un âge d’or du court métrage ?" [The Group of Thirty: A Golden Age of Short Film?], Bref, no. 20, Spring 1994
- Luce Vigo and Catherine Shapira, Kirikou et la sorcière de Michel Ocelot [Kirikou and the Sorceress by Michel Ocelot], Les Enfants de cinéma (Carnets de notes sur...), 2000
- Luce Vigo, Jean Vigo : une vie engagée dans le cinéma ["Jean Vigo: a life committed to cinema"], Cahiers du cinéma, 2002
- Luce Vigo, "Jean Vigo, cineaste" [Jean Vigo, filmmaker], Célébrations nationales, ministère de la Culture et de la Communication, 2005
- Luce Vigo, Agnès Varda et Véronique Godard, Détours, de Oaxaca à Tannay [Detours, from Oaxaca to Tannay], Filigranes Éditions, 2010
