= Territory of Love =

2018 film by Romain Cogitore

- Theatrical release poster
- French: L'Autre continent
- Directed by: Romain Cogitore
- Written by: Romain Cogitore
- Produced by: Vincent Wang; Sophie Erbs; Estela Valdiviesco Chen; Nobu Tsai Hsin-Hung
- Starring: Déborah François; Paul Hamy; Daniel Martin; Christiane Millet; Vincent Perez; Nanou Garcia; Aviis Zhong
- Cinematography: Thomas Ozoux
- Edited by: Florent Vassault; Romain Cogitore
- Music by: Mathieu Lamboley
- Production companies: Cinéma Defacto; House on Fire
- Distributed by: Dulac Distribution (France); House on Fire (Taiwan)
- Release dates: 8 November 2018 (Rencontres du Cinéma Francophone en Beaujolais); 16 November 2018 (Taiwan); 5 June 2019 (France)
- Running time: 90 min
- Countries: France; Taiwan
- Languages: French; Mandarin; English; Dutch

Territory of Love (French: L'Autre continent) is a 2018 romantic drama film written and directed by Romain Cogitore, starring Déborah François and Paul Hamy. The film was co-produced by France and Taiwan and made its world premiere at the Rencontres du Cinéma Francophone en Beaujolais on 8 November 2018, where it won the Audience Award. It was released theatrically in Taiwan by House on Fire on 16 November 2018, and in France by Dulac Distribution on 5 June 2019.

== Plot ==
Maria is a restless young Dutch woman and aspiring writer who lives in France, speaks five languages, has seven unfinished novels and is trying to finish her latest one. She moves to Taipei and lives on small jobs. There she meets Olivier, a young and shy French expat who works as a tour guide and can speak fourteen languages, and they fall in love. When things seemed fine between them, Olivier is diagnosed with a rare type of Leukemia and they must return to France to begin his treatment in Strasbourg.

== Cast ==
- Déborah François as Maria
- Paul Hamy as Olivier
- Daniel Martin as Jacques
- Christiane Millet as Sophie-Charlotte
- Vincent Perez as Professor Deglacière
- Aviis Zhong as Professor Chen
- Nanou Garcia as Danouta
- Nathanaël Bez as Alex

== Production ==
=== Development ===
The film was based on a real story that a woman who was an acquaintance of director Romain Cogitore told him about a bereavement that she was living, although the man she was talking about was not dead.

Déborah François and Paul Hamy learned all of their lines in Mandarin phonetically.

=== Filming ===
Filming took place in Kaohsiung and in Taichung in Taiwan, and in Alsace and Limoges in France between 12 April 2017 and 8 June 2017.

== Release ==
The film made its world premiere at the Rencontres du Cinéma Francophone en Beaujolais on 8 November 2018. It was released theatrically in Taiwan by House on Fire on 16 November 2018, and in France by Dulac Distribution on 5 June 2019.

== Reception ==
AlloCiné, a French cinema site, gave the film an average rating of 3.3/5, based on a survey of 18 French reviews.

== Awards and nominations ==
Year	Award / Festival	Category	Recipient(s)	Result	Ref.
2012	SACD Beaumarchais Award	Best Script	Romain Cogitore	Won	
2013	Grand Prix du Meilleur Scénariste	Junior Prize for Best Screenplay	Romain Cogitore	Nominated	
2018	Rencontres du cinéma francophone en Beaujolais	Audience Award	Romain Cogitore	Won	
2019	Tübingen-Stuttgart French Film Festival	Grand Prix - International Competition	Romain Cogitore	Won	
