= Jean Vigo =

French film director (1905–1934)

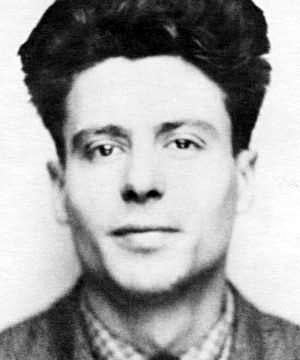
- Vigo, 1930s
- Born: 26 April 1905; Paris, France
- Died: 5 October 1934 (aged 29); Paris, France
- Occupation: Film director
- Years active: 1930–1934

Jean Vigo (French: [ʒɑ̃ viɡo]; 26 April 1905 – 5 October 1934) was a French film director who helped establish poetic realism in film in the 1930s. His work influenced French New Wave cinema of the late 1950s and early 1960s.

== Biography ==
Vigo was born to Emily Cléro and the militant anarchist and later socialist Miguel Almereyda. Much of Vigo's early life was spent on the run with his parents. His father was imprisoned and probably murdered in Fresnes Prison on 13 August 1917, although the death was officially a suicide. Some speculated that Almereyda's death was hushed up on orders of the Radical politicians Louis Malvy and Joseph Caillaux, who were later punished for wartime treason. The young Vigo was subsequently sent to boarding school under an assumed name, Jean Sales, to conceal his identity.

Vigo married Elisabeth "Lydou" Lozinska (1906 – 1939) in January 1929, and they had a daughter, Luce Vigo, a film critic, in 1931. Involved in anarchist circles, from 1932 he was close to the Communist Party and became a member of the Association of Revolutionary Writers and Artists.

He died in 1934 of complications from tuberculosis, which he had contracted eight years earlier.

== Career ==
Vigo is noted for two films that affected the future development of both French and world cinema: Zero for Conduct (1933) and L'Atalante (1934). Zero for Conduct was approvingly described by critic David Thomson in The New Biographical Dictionary of Film as "forty-four minutes of sustained, if roughly shot anarchic crescendo." L'Atalante was Vigo's only full-length feature. The simple story of a newly married couple splitting and reuniting effortlessly merges unpolished, naturalistic filmmaking with shimmering, dreamlike sequences and effects. Thomson described the result as "not so much a masterpiece as a definition of cinema, and thus a film that stands resolutely apart from the great body of films."

His career began with two other films: À propos de Nice ("about Nice", 1930), a subversive silent film that considered social inequity in the resort town of Nice and was inspired by Soviet newsreels; and Jean Taris, Swimming Champion (1931), a short documentary film about the swimmer Jean Taris. None of his four films was a financial success; at one point, with his and his wife's health suffering, Vigo was forced to sell his camera.

Zero for Conduct was banned by the French government until after the war, and L'Atalante was mutilated by its distributor. By this point, Vigo was too ill to strenuously fight the matter. Both films have outlived their detractors; L'Atalante was chosen as the 10th-greatest film of all time in Sight & Sound's 1962 poll, and as the 6th-best in its 1992 poll. In the late 1980s a 1934 copy of L'Atalante was found in the British National Film and Television Archive, and became a key element in the restoration of the film to its original version.

Writing on Vigo's career in The New York Times, film critic Andrew Johnston stated: "The ranks of the great film directors are short on Keatses and Shelleys, young artists cut off in their prime, leaving behind a handful of great works that suggest what might have been. But one who qualifies is Jean Vigo, the French director who died of tuberculosis at age 29 in 1934."

== Filmography ==
- 1930: À propos de Nice
- 1931: La Natation par Jean Taris or Taris, roi de l'eau
- 1933: Zéro de conduite
- 1934: L'Atalante

== Awards ==
The 2011 Parajanov-Vartanov Institute Award posthumously honored Vigo for Zero for Conduct and was presented to his daughter French film critic Luce Vigo. Martin Scorsese wrote a letter for the occasion with praise for Vigo, Sergei Parajanov and Mikhail Vartanov, all of whom struggled with heavy censorship.

== Legacy ==
- The Prix Jean Vigo is an annual award given since 1951 to outstanding French film directors.
- The Jean Vigo Award is an annual prize given to Best Director at the Navarra International Documentary Film Festival in Spain.
- Jean Vigo, a biographical play about Vigo by Paulo Emilio Salles Gomez
- Love's A Revolution, a stage adaptation of the Gomez play by Chris Ward
- Vigo: Passion for Life, a 1998 British biopic based on the Ward play, starring James Frain

== Bibliography ==
- Gomes, P. E. Salles (1998). Jean Vigo. Paris: Editions du Seuil, 1957. ISBN 0-571-19610-1.
- Le Cain, Maximilian. "Jean Vigo". Senses of Cinema. Archived from the original on 5 February 2007.
- Temple, Michael (2011). Jean Vigo. Manchester University Press. ISBN 9780719056338.
- Wakeman, John (1987). World Film Directors, Volume 1, 1890–1945. New York: The H. W. Wilson Company, 1987. ISBN 978-0-82420-757-1.
- Weir, David (2014). Jean Vigo and the Anarchist Eye. Atlanta: On Our Own Authority!. ISBN 978-0990641810.
