= Charlotte Rampling filmography =

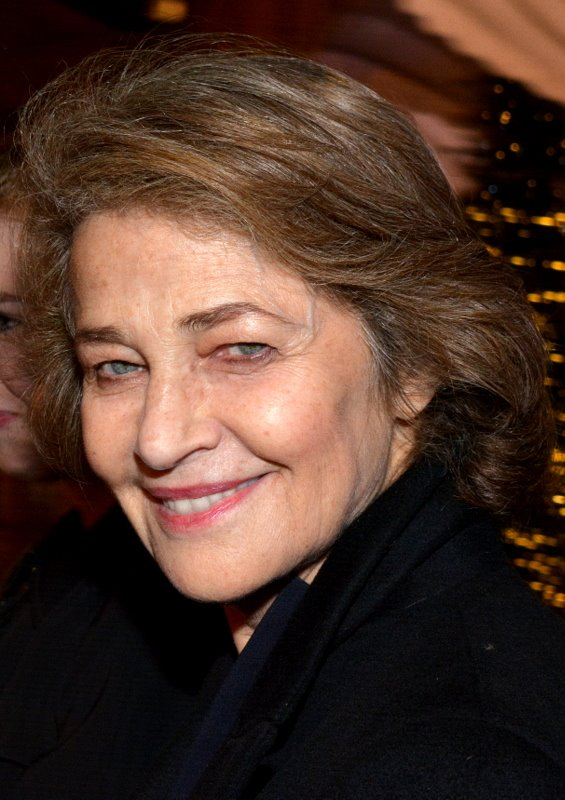
Charlotte Rampling attending the 2016 Cannes Film Festival

English actress Charlotte Rampling began her acting career in 1965. She has appeared in more than 110 films. Her film roles include Georgy Girl (1966), The Damned (1969), Henry VIII and His Six Wives (1972), The Night Porter (1974), Farewell, My Lovely (1975), Stardust Memories (1980), The Verdict (1982), Angel Heart (1987), D.O.A. (1988), The Duchess (2008), 45 Years (2015), and Hannah (2017). She has also made television appearances, which include Dexter, Restless, Broadchurch and London Spy.

== Filmography ==
Key
†	Denotes works that have not yet been released

=== Film ===
Year	Title	Role	Notes
1964	A Hard Day's Night	Nightclub Dancer	Uncredited
1965	The Knack ...and How to Get It	Water Skier	Uncredited
1965	Rotten to the Core	Sara Capell	
1966	Georgy Girl	Meredith	
1967	The Long Duel	Jane	
1968	Sardinia Kidnapped	Christina Fisher	
1969	Target: Harry	Ruth Carlyle	
1969	The Damned	Elisabeth Thalmann	
1969	Three	Marty	
1971	Vanishing Point	Female hitchhiker	Scenes deleted in U.S. print
1971	'Tis Pity She's a Whore	Annabella	
1971	The Ski Bum	Samantha	
1972	Henry VIII and His Six Wives	Anne Boleyn	
1972	Corky	Peggy Jo Curtiss	
1972	Asylum	Barbara	
1973	Giordano Bruno	Fosca	
1974	Zardoz	Consuella	
1974	Caravan to Vaccarès	Lila	
1974	The Night Porter	Lucia Atherton	
1975	Yuppi du	Silvia	
1975	La Chair de l'orchidée	Claire	
1975	Farewell, My Lovely	Helen Grayle	
1976	Foxtrot	Julia	
1977	Orca	Dr. Rachel Bedford	
1977	The Purple Taxi	Sharon Frederick	
1980	Stardust Memories	Dorrie	
1982	The Verdict	Laura Fischer	
1984	Viva la vie!	Catherine Perrin	
1985	He Died with His Eyes Open	Barbara Spark	
1985	Tristesse et beauté	Léa Uéno	
1986	Max mon amour	Margaret Jones	
1987	Angel Heart	Margaret Krusemark	
1987	Mascara	Gaby Hart	
1988	Paris by Night	Clara Paige	
1988	D.O.A.	Mrs. Fitzwaring	
1989	Rebus	Miriam, contessa di Du Terrail	
1993	Hammers Over the Anvil	Grace McAlister	
1993	Asphalt Tango	Marion	
1994	Murder in Mind	Sonya Davies	
1994	Time Is Money	Irina Kaufman	
1996	Invasion of Privacy	Deidre Stiles, Josh's Attorney	
1996	Asphalt Tango	Marion	
1997	The Wings of the Dove	Maude Lowder	
1999	The Cherry Orchard	Lyubov Ranyevskaya	
2000	Signs and Wonders	Marjorie	
2000	Hommage à Alfred Lepetit		
2000	Aberdeen	Helen	
2000	Under the Sand	Marie Drillon	
2001	The Fourth Angel	Kate Stockton	
2001	Superstition	Frances Matteo	
2001	Spy Game	Ann Cathcart	
2002	Summer Things	Elizabeth Lannier	
2003	I'll Sleep When I'm Dead	Helen	
2003	Swimming Pool	Sarah Morton	
2003	The Statement	Nicole	
2004	Jerusalemski sindrom		
2004	Immortal	Elma Turner	
2004	The Keys to the House	Nicole	
2005	Lemming	Alice Pollock	
2005	Vers le sud	Ellen	
2006	Basic Instinct 2	Milena Gardosh	
2006	Désaccord parfait	Alice d'Abanville	
2007	Angel	Hermione Gilbright	
2007	Caótica Ana	Justine	
2008	Deception	Wall Street Belle	
2008	Babylon A.D.	Noelite High Priestess	
2008	The Duchess	Georgiana Spencer, Countess Spencer	
2009	The Ball of the Actresses	Herself	
2009	Boogie Woogie	Emille	
2009	La femme invisible (d'après une histoire)	Rose	
2009	Life During Wartime	Jacqueline	
2010	Never Let Me Go	Miss Emily	
2010	StreetDance 3D	Helena	
2010	Rio Sex Comedy	Charlotte	
2010	The Mill and the Cross	Mary	
2011	The Look	Herself	Documentary
2011	Melancholia	Gaby	
2011	The Eye of the Storm	Elizabeth Hunter	
2011	Cleanskin	Charlotte McQueen	
2012	I, Anna	Anna Welles	
2012	Tutto parla di tie	Pauline	
2013	Night Train to Lisbon	Adriana do Prado	
2013	Young & Beautiful	Alice Ferriere	
2013	The Sea	Miss Vavasour	
2013	The Blueblack Hussar	Herself	Documentary on the 2010–2011 musical comeback of Adam Ant, directed by Jack Bond
2014	Portrait of the Artist	La mère	Voice
2015	The Forbidden Room	The Ostler's Mother	
2015	45 Years	Kate Mercer	
2016	Assassin's Creed	Ellen Kaye	
2017	The Sense of an Ending	Veronica Ford	
2017	Hannah	Hannah	
2017	Euphoria	Marina	
2018	Red Sparrow	Matron	
2018	The Little Stranger	Mrs. Aryes	
2020	Last Words	Baltik	
2021	Benedetta	The Abbess	
2021	Everything Went Fine	Claude	
2021	Dune	Gaius Helen Mohiam	
2021	Juniper	Ruth	
2024	Dune: Part Two	Gaius Helen Mohiam	
2024	Last Breath	Sidonie	
2025	Father Mother Sister Brother	Mother	
2025	Two Pianos	Elena	
2026	Dune: Part Three †	Gaius Helen Mohiam	Post-production
TBA	Santo Subito! †	Anna-Teresa Tymieniecka	Post-production
TBA	Maya Butterfly †		Filming

=== Television ===
Year	Title	Role	Notes
1967	The Avengers	Hana Wilde	Episode: "The Superlative Seven"
1976	Sherlock Holmes in New York	Irene Adler	Television movie
1983	Infidélités	Flaminia	Television movie
1992	La Femme abandonée	Fanny de Lussange	Television movie
1995	Samson le magnifique	Isabelle de Marsac	Television movie
1995	Radetzskymarsch	Valerie von Taussig	Miniseries
1996	La Dernière Fête	La marquise	Television film
1999	Great Expectations	Miss Havisham	Television film
2000	My Uncle Silas	Sylvia Featherstone	Episode: "The Widder/The Blue Feather"
2003	Imperium: Augustus	Livia Drusilla	Television movie
2009	Quelque chose à te dire	Mady Celliers	Television movie
2009	L'homme aux cercles bleus	Mathilde	Television movie
2010	Un Lieu incertain	Mathilde	Television movie; sequel to L'homme aux cercles bleus
2012	Restless	Sally Gilmartin	Television movie
2013	Dexter	Dr. Evelyn Vogel	10 episodes
2015	Broadchurch	Jocelyn Knight	8 episodes
2015	London Spy	Frances Turner	2 episodes
2019–2023	DNA	Claire Bobin	10 episodes

== Video games ==
Year	Title	Role	Notes
1998	Ring	Erda	Voice

== See also ==
- List of awards and nominations received by Charlotte Rampling
