= List of awards and nominations received by Charlotte Rampling =

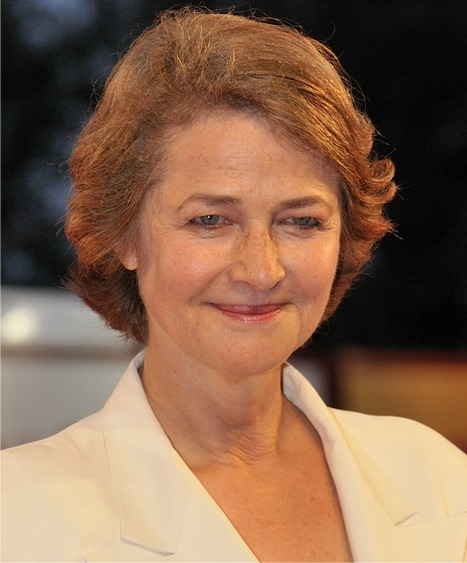
Rampling at the 66th Venice International Film Festival

The following is a list of the awards and nominations received by Charlotte Rampling.

== Major associations ==
=== Academy Awards ===
Year	Category	Nominated work	Result	Ref.
2016	Best Actress	45 Years	Nominated	

=== Berlin International Film Festival ===
Year	Category	Nominated work	Result
2015	Silver Bear for Best Actress	45 Years	Won
2019	Honorary Golden Bear	—N/a	Recipient

=== César Awards ===
Year	Category	Nominated work	Result
1986	Best Actress	He Died with His Eyes Open	Nominated
2001	Honorary César	—N/a	Recipient
2002	Best Actress	Under the Sand	Nominated
2004	Best Actress	Swimming Pool	Nominated
2006	Best Supporting Actress	Lemming	Nominated

=== Emmy Awards ===
Year	Category	Nominated work	Result
Primetime Emmy Awards
2013	Outstanding Supporting Actress in a Miniseries or a Movie	Restless	Nominated

=== European Film Awards ===
Year	Category	Nominated work	Result
2001	Best Actress	Under the Sand	Nominated
2003	Best Actress	Swimming Pool	Won
2003	People's Choice Award for Best Actress	Swimming Pool	Nominated
2004	People's Choice Award for Best Actress	Immortal	Nominated
2005	People's Choice Award for Best Actress	Lemming	Nominated
2015	Best Actress	45 Years	Won
2015	Lifetime Achievement Award	—N/a	Honoured

=== Golden Globe Awards ===
Year	Category	Nominated work	Result
2017	Best Actress – Miniseries or Television Film	London Spy	Nominated

=== Screen Actors Guild Award ===
Year	Category	Nominated work	Result
2013	Outstanding Performance by a Female Actor in a Miniseries or Television Movie	Restless	Nominated

=== Venice Film Festival ===
Year	Category	Nominated work	Result
2017	Volpi Cup for Best Actress	Hannah	Won

== Other awards and nominations ==
=== AACTA Awards ===
Year	Category	Nominated work	Result
2011	Best Actress in a Leading Role	The Eye of the Storm	Nominated

=== Alliance of Women Film Journalists ===
Year	Category	Nominated work	Result
2015	—N/a	Female Icon of the Year	Nominated
2015	—N/a	Actress Defying Age and Ageism	Won
2015	Best Actress	45 Years	Won

=== Boston Society of Film Critics Awards ===
Year	Category	Nominated work	Result
2015	Best Actress	45 Years	Won

=== British Independent Film Awards ===
Year	Category	Nominated work	Result
2015	Best Performance by an Actress in a British Independent Film	45 Years	Nominated

=== Chicago Film Critics Association ===
Year	Category	Nominated work	Result
2015	Best Actress	45 Years	Nominated

=== Cinemanila International Film Festival ===
Year	Category	Nominated work	Result
2001	Special Recognition Award for Career Achievement	—N/a	Honoured

=== Critics' Choice Movie Awards ===
Year	Category	Nominated work	Result
2015	Best Actress	45 Years	Nominated

=== Dallas-Fort Worth Film Critics Association ===
Year	Category	Nominated work	Result
2015	Best Actress	45 Years	Nominated

=== Edinburgh International Film Festival ===
Year	Category	Nominated work	Result
2015	Best Performance in a Feature Film	45 Years	Won

=== Evening Standard Film Awards ===
Year	Category	Nominated work	Result
2013	Best Actress	I, Anna	Nominated
2016	Best Actress	45 Years	Nominated

=== Fantasporto ===
Year	Category	Nominated work	Result
1987	Best Actress	Mascara	Won

=== Florida Film Critics Circle ===
Year	Category	Nominated work	Result
2015	Best Actress	45 Years	Nominated

=== Indiana Film Journalists ===
Year	Category	Nominated work	Result
2015	Best Actress	45 Years	Nominated

=== Indiewire ===
Year	Category	Nominated work	Result
2016	Best Lead Actress	45 Years	Nominated

=== Locarno Festival ===
Year	Category	Nominated work	Result
2012	Excellence Award Moët & Chandon	—N/a	Honoured

=== London Film Critics' Circle ===
Year	Category	Nominated work	Result
2003	British Actress of the Year	Swimming Pool	Nominated
2015	Actress of the Year	45 Years	Won

=== Los Angeles Film Critics Association ===
Year	Category	Nominated work	Result
2015	Best Actress	45 Years	Won

=== National Society of Film Critics ===
Year	Category	Nominated work	Result
2000	Best Actress	Under the Sand	Nominated
2015	Best Actress	45 Years	Won

=== Online Film Critics Society Award ===
Year	Category	Nominated work	Result
2015	Best Actress	45 Years	Nominated

=== San Diego Film Critics Society Awards ===
Year	Category	Nominated work	Result
2015	Best Actress	45 Years	Nominated

=== San Francisco Film Critics Circle Awards ===
Year	Category	Nominated work	Result
2015	Best Actress	45 Years	Nominated

=== Satellite Awards ===
Year	Category	Nominated work	Result
2016	Best Actress - Motion Picture	45 Years	Nominated

=== Stockholm International Film Festival ===
Year	Category	Nominated work	Result
2008	Lifetime Achievement Award	—N/a	Honoured

=== Telluride Film Festival ===
Year	Category	Nominated work	Result
2005	Silver Medallion	—N/a	Honoured

=== Valladolid Film Festival ===
Year	Category	Nominated work	Result
2015	Best Actress	45 Years	Won

== See also ==
- Charlotte Rampling filmography
