= Jean-Noël Tassez =

French journalist and businessman (1956–2015)

Jean-Noël Tassez (18 March 1956 – 2 October 2015) was a French journalist and businessman.

Tassez was born in Dornecy, France. He became a journalist for the newspaper La Marseillaise and was later appointed president of the SOFIRAD and director of RMC. He ran the Astorg Council, a company specializing in communication and influence. He was one of the main parties involved in the Mitterrand–Pasqua affair, and lodged a formal complaint in court against Yves Bertrand.

The longtime companion of the British actress Charlotte Rampling, Tassez died of cancer on 2 October 2015 in the Hôpital Européen Georges-Pompidou in Paris.
