= Jean-Marc Fabre =

French cinematographer (born 1964)

- Born: 7 June 1964 (age 62)
- Occupation: Cinematographer

Jean-Marc Fabre (French pronunciation: [ʒɑ̃ maʁk fabʁ]; born 7 June 1964) is a French cinematographer. He has contributed to more than fifty films since 1988, including Lemming and Nathalie....

== Filmography ==
- 1989 : Dis-moi oui, dis-moi non, short film directed by Noémie Lvovsky
- 1991 : The Sky Above Paris
- 1996 : Un héros très discret
- 1998 : A Soldier's Daughter Never Cries
- 1998 : Tokyo Eyes
- 2001 : How I Killed My Father
- 2005 : Lemming
- 2009 : Change of Plans
- 2012 : Camille Rewinds
- 2015 : Valentin Valentin
- 2017 : Garde alternée
