= Emmanuèle Bernheim =

French writer (1955–2017)

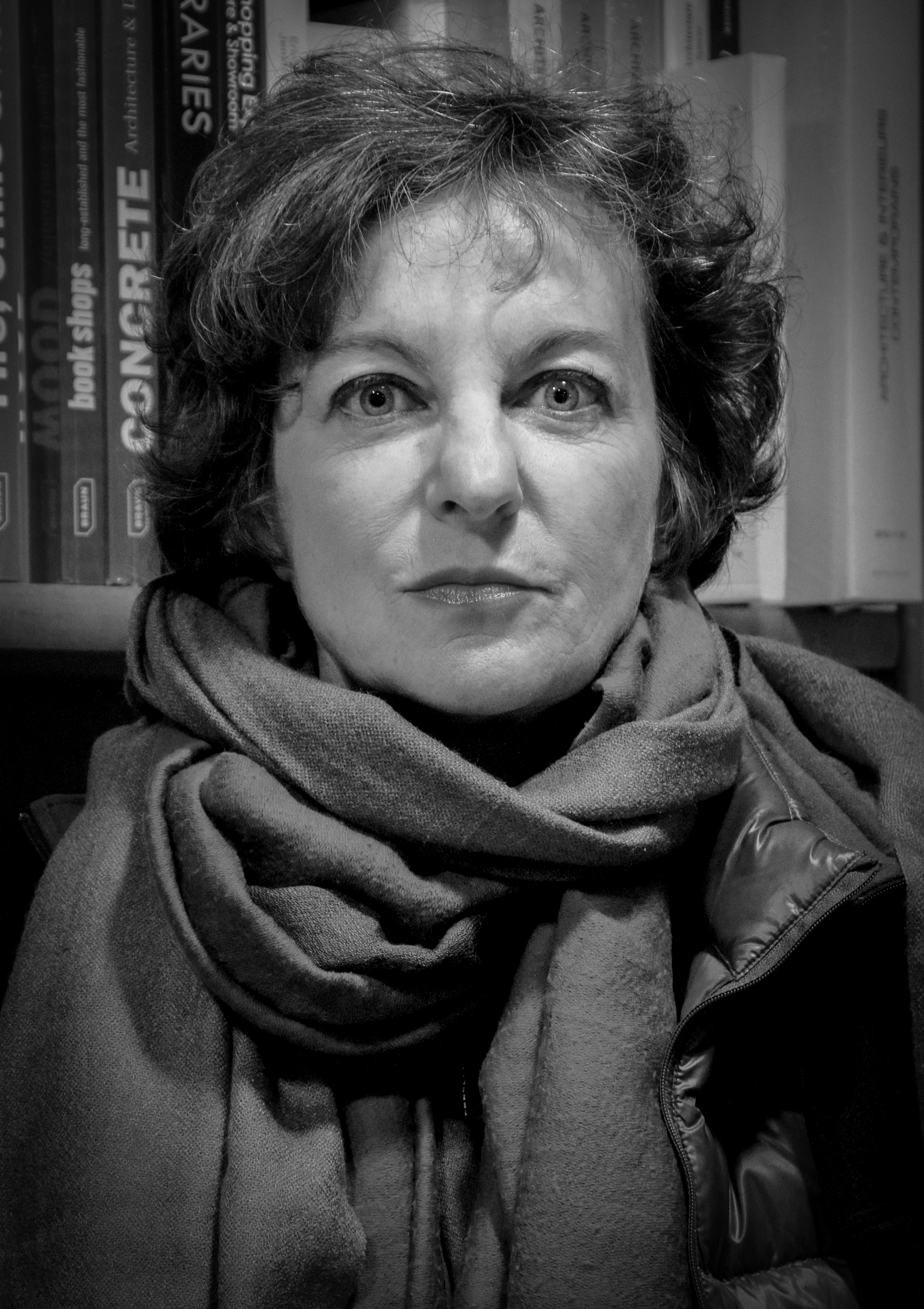
Emmanuèle Bernheim, 2013

Emmanuèle Bernheim (December 1955 – 10 May 2017) was a French writer. She was the daughter of art collector André Bernheim and sculptor Claude de Soria. In 1993 she won the Prix Médicis with her book Sa femme. She wrote the screenplay of feature films Swimming Pool (2003) and 5x2 (2004), both directed by François Ozon. She lived in Paris and also worked for television.

In 1998 she wrote Vendredi soir (Friday night), a novel that was adapted into a film by Claire Denis in 2002. She also worked with Michel Houellebecq on a film adaptation of his novel Platform.

Her memoir Tout s'est bien passé (Everything went fine) was adapted in 2021 for a film of the same name by Ozon.

== Literature and cinema ==
Author of Le Cran d'arrêt in 1985 and Un couple in 1988, she won the Prix Médicis in 1993 for her novel Sa femme, published by Éditions Gallimard.

In cinema, she collaborated with François Ozon on the screenplays for the films Under the Sand, Swimming Pool, and 5x2. Her 1998 novel Vendredi soir was adapted into the eponymous film by Claire Denis.

With Michel Houellebecq, she wrote a film adaptation of Platform, which was never produced.

Finally, she worked with Alain Cavalier, who invited her to film Living and Knowing It, an adaptation of Everything Went Fine (Tout s'est bien passé), an account in which she recounts helping her father end his life. Her cancer developed during the project, and the film was overtaken by her death.

== Death ==
She died on 10 May 2017 in the 18th arrondissement of Paris at the age of 61, following complications from lung cancer. Her ashes were interred at the Père Lachaise Cemetery.

== Personal life ==
From 1987 until her death, Emmanuèle Bernheim was the partner of Serge Toubiana, who paid tribute to her in his book Les Bouées jaunes.
