= Everything Went Fine =

2021 film by François Ozon

- Theatrical release poster
- French: Tout s'est bien passé
- Directed by: François Ozon
- Screenplay by: François Ozon
- Based on: Everything Went Well by Emmanuèle Bernheim
- Produced by: Éric Altmayer; Nicolas Altmayer
- Starring: Sophie Marceau; André Dussollier; Géraldine Pailhas
- Cinematography: Hichame Alaouié
- Edited by: Laure Gardette
- Production companies: Mandarin Films; FOZ; France 2 Cinéma; Playtime; Scope Pictures
- Distributed by: Diaphana Distribution
- Release dates: 7 July 2021 (Cannes); 22 September 2021 (France)
- Running time: 113 minutes
- Country: France
- Language: French
- Budget: $7.3 million
- Box office: $2.2 million

Everything Went Fine (French: Tout s'est bien passé) is a 2021 French drama film written and directed by François Ozon, based on the memoir Everything Went Well by Emmanuèle Bernheim. It stars Sophie Marceau, André Dussollier, Géraldine Pailhas, Charlotte Rampling, Hanna Schygulla, Éric Caravaca and Grégory Gadebois.

The film had its world premiere at the Cannes Film Festival on 7 July 2021. It was released in France on 22 September 2021 by Diaphana Distribution.

== Plot ==
Emmanuèle Bernheim is asked by her domineering father André, who's recently been hospitalised after a stroke, to help him end his life. She's upset, remembering how he was constantly critical of her as a girl, and feels he's bullying her again. Euthanasia is illegal in France so she contacts a Swiss clinic that carries out such procedures: when she meets one of the staff, it's emphasised that he must take a fatal glass of lethal drugs himself - they can prepare it but will not actively kill him. As Emmanuèle and her sister Pascale make plans to get him across the border into Switzerland, he says farewell to friends. But his cousin Simone, who survived a death camp during the war, pleads with him not to throw away his life. A former lover, the unhinged Gérard, who also wants him to live, demands to see him in hospital: André eventually allows Gérard to visit, but remains obdurate in his wish to die. However, as they prepare to take him away, the sisters are called in by the police, who have been informed (by Gérard) of their plan. They're released, and sneak their father into an ambulance - though in a further complication, one of the drivers is a Muslim and unwilling to take part. But he arrives in Bern, and next morning the Swiss woman phones them to say he died peacefully, holding her hand.

== Cast ==
- Sophie Marceau as Emmanuèle Bernheim
- André Dussollier as André Bernheim
- Géraldine Pailhas as Pascale Bernheim
- Charlotte Rampling as Claude de Soria
- Éric Caravaca as Serge Toubiana
- Hanna Schygulla as The Swiss
- Grégory Gadebois as Gérard Boisrond
- Judith Magre as Simone
- Annie Mercier as The clinic manager
- Jacques Nolot
- Laëtitia Clément

== Production ==
In March 2020, it was announced Sophie Marceau, André Dussollier and Laëtitia Clément had joined the cast of the film, with François Ozon directing from a screenplay he wrote, based upon the novel Everything Went Well by Emmanuèle Bernheim. Principal photography began in late 2020.

== Release ==
The film had its world premiere at the Cannes Film Festival on 7 July 2021. Shortly thereafter, Cohen Media Group and Curzon Artificial Eye acquired US and UK distribution rights to the film, respectively. Everything Went Fine was released theatrically in France on September 22, 2021, by Diaphana Distribution. In the United States, it was given a limited theatrical release beginning in New York City on April 14, 2023, followed by a national expansion.

== Critical reception ==
On the review aggregator website Rotten Tomatoes, the film holds an approval rating of 91% based on 68 reviews, with an average rating of 7.5/10. The website's consensus reads, "Everything Went Fine faces serious themes with an effectively light touch -- and the estimable talents of its brilliant veteran stars."
