= Juniper (film) =

2021 New Zealand film by Matthew J. Saville

- Directed by: Matthew J. Saville
- Written by: Matthew J. Saville
- Produced by: Desray Armstrong; Angela Littlejohn
- Starring: Charlotte Rampling
- Cinematography: Martyn Williams
- Edited by: Peter Roberts
- Production company: Sandy Lane Productions
- Distributed by: Transmission Films
- Release date: 26 August 2021
- Running time: 94 minutes
- Country: New Zealand
- Language: English
- Box office: $881,728

Juniper is a 2021 New Zealand drama film directed and written by Matthew J. Saville, starring Charlotte Rampling.

It received generally positive reviews, with praise going towards Saville's direction and the performances of Rampling and George Ferrier.

== Plot ==
Set in rural New Zealand in the 1990s, the film tells the story of the developing relationship of the adolescent Sam and his acerbic and alcoholic grandmother with an unconventional past, whom he has not met before.

== Cast ==
- Charlotte Rampling as Ruth
- George Ferrier as Sam
- Marton Csokas as Robert, Sam's father
- Edith Poor as Sarah, Ruth's nurse

== Production ==
Juniper is written and directed by Matthew J. Saville, in his directorial debut feature film.

It was produced by Desray Armstrong and Angela Littlejohn.

The name derives from juniper berries, a key ingredient in gin, to which Ruth is addicted and drinks by the jugful every day.

== Release ==
Juniper screened in many film festivals:

2021

- Bari International Film Festival (International Panorama Competition, Best Actress in a Leading Role, Charlotte Rampling)
- Atlantic International Film Festival – Special Presentation,
- Cinéfest Sudbury International Film Festival
- Edmonton International Film Festival
- Brisbane International Film Festival
- Tallinn Black Nights Film Festival

2022

- Palm Springs International Film Festival
- Santa Barbara International Film Festival
- Edinburgh International Film Festival

It was released in cinemas in New Zealand on 28 October 2021, and in Australia in August 2022, distributed by Transmission Films.

== Reception ==
The film received generally positive reviews. Review aggregator Rotten Tomatoes reports that 92% of 50 critics have given the film a positive review, with an average rating of 7.1 out of 10. The website's critical consensus reads, "Juniper's story offers few surprises -- and it doesn't need any, with Charlotte Rampling holding the viewer rapt from start to finish". Metacritic assigned the film a weighted average score of 68 out of 100, indicating "generally favorable reviews".

The Hollywood Reporter praised its writing in the dialogue between Sam and Ruth. Australian Financial Review wrote "New Zealand films are known for their expansive feeling for landscape, and Juniper is no exception", and "Rampling is predictably good as the tough, intelligent, old woman, but Ferrier, on debut is excellent in the role of a teenage boy struggling towards a hard-won maturity". The ABC's Jason Di Rosso said that Rampling's role was slightly reminiscent of her role in Swimming Pool (2003) and "Saville succeeds in creating an emotional authenticity to Ruth and Sam's difficult relationship...". FilmInk wrote "...the real star here is Rampling. She is subtly sensational, conveying complex emotions with a single glance.", and praised Saville's direction, done "with great compassion and insight".
