= Matthew J. Saville =

New Zealand actor-director

Matthew J. Saville is an actor, writer, and film director from New Zealand.

== Early life and education ==
Matthew J. Saville was born in Durban, South Africa. His mother is a New Zealander and his father South African, and the family moved to New Zealand when he was young. After growing up in the countryside, he went to university, where he discovered theatre and film. He afterwards studied acting at Toi Whakaari.

== Career ==
In 2005 he published a play about the Boer War entitled Kikia te Poa, which was performed at the Old Fitzroy Theatre in Sydney in 2006, directed by Lee Lewis, and in London the following year by Shaky Isles Theatre, a New Zealand theatre company based in London, directed by Stella Duffy.

He has acted on stage and screen, with TV credits in Spartacus (2010), Taika Waititi's comedy series Super City (2011), The Almighty Johnsons (2013), and others. Television writing credits include Shortland Street (2005), The Insiders Guide to Love (2005), and The Blue Rose (2013).

Saville wrote and directed two short films, Hitch Hike (2012) and Dive (2011 or 2012), both of which screened at film festivals, with Dive winning awards at Show Me Shorts.

His directorial debut feature film is Juniper (2021), starring Charlotte Rampling and George Ferrier, which he wrote and directed. It was well-reviewed by critics, who praised the writing, direction and the performances.
