= The Sky Above Paris =

1991 drama film

- Directed by: Michel Béna
- Screenplay by: Michel Béna; Isabelle Coudrier-Kleist; Cécile Vargaftig
- Produced by: Alain Sarde; Christine Gozlan
- Starring: Sandrine Bonnaire
- Cinematography: Jean-Marc Fabre
- Edited by: Catherine Schwartz
- Music by: Jorge Arriagada
- Release date: 1991
- Language: Italian

The Sky Above Paris (French: Le ciel de Paris) is a 1991 French drama film co-written and directed by Michel Béna and starring Sandrine Bonnaire. It was entered into the Venice International Film Critics' Week competition at the 48th Venice International Film Festival. It marked the directorial debut of Béna, who died of AIDS a few weeks before its premiere.

== Plot ==
Suzanne, emotionally scarred from a past affair, moves to Paris with her gay best friend Marc. One evening at a swimming pool, Suzanne faints and is rescued by Marc and Lucien. The incident sparks a bond among the three. Marc quickly falls in love with Lucien, but Lucien and Suzanne also begin a romance, leaving Marc heartbroken. Despite their friendship, the trio becomes entangled in misunderstandings, missed encounters, and unspoken desires.

== Cast ==
- Sandrine Bonnaire as Suzanne
- Marc Fourastier as Marc
- Paul Blain as Lucien
- Évelyne Bouix as Clothilde
- Tanya Lopert as the florist
- Pierre Amzallag as Théo
- Xavier Beauvois as soupirant
- Pascal Bonitzer as man on the telephone
- Armand Delcampe as Lucien's father
- Niels Dubost as Pierre
