= Swimming Pool (2003 film) =

Film by François Ozon

- French theatrical release poster
- Directed by: François Ozon
- Written by: François Ozon; Emmanuèle Bernheim
- Produced by: Olivier Delbosc; Marc Missonnier
- Starring: Charlotte Rampling; Ludivine Sagnier; Charles Dance; Marc Fayolle; Jean-Marie Lamour
- Cinematography: Yorick Le Saux
- Edited by: Monica Coleman
- Music by: Philippe Rombi
- Production companies: Fidélité; Headforce Limited; France 2 Cinéma; Gimages Films; Foz; StudioCanal
- Distributed by: Mars Distribution (France); UGC Films (United Kingdom)
- Release dates: 18 May 2003 (Cannes); 21 May 2003 (France); 22 August 2003 (United Kingdom)
- Running time: 103 minutes
- Countries: France; United Kingdom
- Languages: English; French
- Budget: €6.1 million
- Box office: US$22.4 million

Swimming Pool is a 2003 erotic psychological thriller film co-written and directed by François Ozon and starring Charlotte Rampling and Ludivine Sagnier. The plot focuses on a British crime novelist, Sarah Morton (Rampling), who travels to her publisher's upmarket summer house in Southern France to seek solitude in order to work on her next book. However, the arrival of Julie (Sagnier), who claims to be the publisher's daughter, induces complications and a subsequent crime. Both lead characters are bilingual, and the film's dialogue is a mixture of French and English.

Swimming Pool premiered at the Cannes Film Festival on 18 May 2003, and was released theatrically in France three days later. It was given a limited theatrical release in the United States that July and was edited to avoid an NC-17 rating due to its strong sexual content and nudity. It was subsequently released in North America on DVD in an unrated cut.

The film ignited controversy with audiences because of its ambiguous nature and unclear conclusion which can be interpreted in various ways. In France, many comparisons were made with Jacques Deray's 1969 film La Piscine (The Swimming Pool), starring Romy Schneider and Alain Delon.

== Plot ==
Sarah Morton, a middle-aged English mystery author based in London, who has written a successful series of detective novels, is experiencing writer's block that is impeding her next book. Her publisher, John Bosload, offers her his country house near Lacoste, France, for some rest and relaxation. Sarah takes him up on the offer, hinting that she hopes John may visit. After settling into the spacious, sun-filled house and meeting the groundskeeper, Marcel, Sarah finds her quietude disrupted by a young woman claiming to be John's daughter, Julie. She arrives late one night explaining that she is taking time off from work herself. She eventually tells Sarah that her mother used to be John's mistress, but that he would not leave his family.

Julie's sex life consists of one-night stands with various men, and a competition of personalities develops between the two women. At first, Sarah regards Julie as a distraction from her writing. She uses earplugs to sleep during Julie's noisy sexual encounters, but develops a voyeuristic fascination with them, abandoning the earplugs during one of Julie's trysts. Sarah sneaks into Julie's room and steals her diary, using it in the novel she is working on. The competition comes to the fore when a local waiter, Franck, is involved. Julie is attracted to him, but he appears to prefer the more mature Sarah, having struck up a relationship with her during her frequent lunches at the bistro.

An unexpected tragedy occurs after a night of flirting among the three. After swimming together in the pool, Franck refuses to allow Julie to continue performing oral sex on him once Sarah, who is watching them from the balcony, throws a rock into the water. Franck tells Julie he is leaving. The next day, Franck is missing. While investigating Franck's disappearance, Sarah is told that Julie's mother died years earlier, though Julie had spoken of her mother as if she were alive. She returns to the villa, where a confused Julie thinks Sarah is her mother and has a breakdown. Julie eventually recovers and confesses that Franck is dead after she repeatedly hit him over the head with a rock as he tried to leave her at the pool. His body is in one of the sheds.

When Marcel becomes suspicious of the mound of fresh soil where Sarah and Julie have buried Franck's body, Sarah seduces him to distract him. Julie leaves, thanking Sarah for her help and leaving her the manuscript of an unpublished novel she claims her mother wrote, which she had previously said John made her mother burn. Sarah uses the mother's manuscript in her novel.

Sarah returns to London and visits John at his publishing office with her new novel, titled Swimming Pool, which she anticipated he would reject, so she had it printed by another publisher. His daughter, Julia, arrives just as Sarah is leaving, but is revealed to be a different person from the girl who came to John's house in France.

== Cast ==
- Charlotte Rampling as Sarah Morton
- Ludivine Sagnier as Julie
- Charles Dance as John Bosload
- Jean-Marie Lamour as Franck
- Marc Fayolle as Marcel
- Mireille Mossé as Marcel's daughter
- Michel Fau as the first man
- Jean-Claude Lecas as the second man
- Émilie Gavois-Kahn as waitress at cafe
- Lauren Farrow as Julia
- Sebastian Harcombe as Terry Long
- Frances Cuka as lady on the underground

== Interpretation ==
Ozon has said:

Charlotte's character kept mixing fantasy and reality. Although in Swimming Pool, everything related to fantasy is part of the act of creation, so it is more channeled and less likely to end up causing madness. In terms of directing, I've treated everything that is imaginary in Swimming Pool in a realistic way so that you see it all – fantasy and reality alike – on the same plane.

On the DVD release there are 12 minutes of deleted scenes which run into each other, with shots of Sarah walking around, visiting landmarks, writing, and so forth. Julie is nowhere to be seen in the footage.

== Production ==
=== Development ===
When co-writing the screenplay for the film, Ozon was partly inspired by his own experiences with journalists asking him about his own writing, and he intended to write a story about a writer's internal creative process. "The French press can be very aggressive and jealous... I was tired of journalists always asking me, 'Where does your inspiration come from?'", said Ozon. "I wanted to tell of my way of working and my process of creation. I had the idea of telling this through the character of an English writer, where I could talk about something very intimate, while still hiding myself." The character of Sarah Morton was partly based on the writers Patricia Highsmith and Ruth Rendell.

=== Casting ===
Charlotte Rampling and Ludivine Sagnier were cast as Sarah Morton and Julie, the two respective leads of the film. Rampling had starred in Ozon's film Under the Sand (2000), while Sagnier had acted in his previous films Water Drops on Burning Rocks (2000) and 8 Women (2002). In order to play the character of Julie, Sagnier was fitted with blonde hair extensions and lost approximately 20 pounds (9.1 kg). Commenting on her working relationship with Ozon during a press meeting at the Cannes Film Festival, Sagnier said: "The person sitting next to me [Ozon] is very demanding, but we have reached a point where we don’t really have to talk to understand each other."

Discussing her character of Sarah Morton, Rampling said: "The character is utterly unlike me. English lady thriller writers live in a very specific world. I read a great deal of background and also some of the writing, some Agatha Christie, who is the most famous, and also some Patricia Highsmith and Ruth Rendell. These women really are very peculiar people." Rampling further commented that the building of the character was a collaborative effort with Ozon.

=== Filming ===
Principal photography took place in Vaucluse, Provence-Alpes-Côte d’Azur, with some shooting taking place in London.

== Release ==
In September 2002, UGC Films acquired Swimming Pool for distribution in the United Kingdom. It was announced in December 2002 that Focus Features had acquired distribution rights in North America.

Swimming Pool premiered at the 2003 Cannes Film Festival before opening in France on 21 May 2003. It opened in the United States in a limited theatrical release on 2 July 2003, and in the United Kingdom on 22 August 2003.

=== Home media ===
Focus Features released the film on DVD in North America in January 2004 in both R-rated and unrated editions. In 2019, StudioCanal released a Blu-ray edition in Germany, while a South Korean Blu-ray was released by Ara Media in 2021.

While a North American Blu-ray has not been released, the film has been made available for digital purchase in high definition through Universal Pictures Home Entertainment's retail site Gruv.com.

== Reception ==
=== Box office ===
Swimming Pool grossed $10.1 million in the United States and Canada, and $12.3 million in other territories (including $4 million in France), for a worldwide total of $22.4 million, against a budget of €6.1 million (roughly US$7.8 million). During its opening weekend in France, the film ranked number 2 at the French box office after The Matrix Reloaded.

=== Critical response ===
Swimming Pool received largely favorable reviews from film critics. On the review aggregator website Rotten Tomatoes, 84% of 153 critics' reviews are positive, with an average rating of 7.3/10. The website's consensus reads: "A sensual thriller with two engaging performers demanding our undivided attention." Metacritic, which uses a weighted average, assigned the film a score of 70 out of 100, based on 37 critics, indicating "generally favorable" reviews.

Roger Ebert gave the film a positive review, writing, "François Ozon, the director and co-writer (with Emmanuèle Bernheim), understands as Hitchcock did the small steps by which a wrong decision grows in its wrongness into a terrifying paranoid nightmare". A. O. Scott of The New York Times also wrote favorably of the film, noting that "Ozon is as perverse as he is resourceful, so he slyly turns his delicate study in generational and cross-cultural sexual rivalry into a suspense thriller. There is a mystery lurking in Julie's past, a dead body in the pool house, a wizened dwarf all dressed in black: omens, premonitions, suspicions that things are not what they seem."

Neil Smith of the BBC also praised the film, calling it a "compelling psychological melodrama" and "Hitchcockian thriller". Sarmad Iqbal of the International Policy Digest wrote that the film's "intriguing yet mystifying mix of erotica and thriller set in a part of France that is a far cry from bustling Paris makes you fall in love with it. It is not just the plot, the setting and the way actors have immaculately performed their roles will make you shower praise on this film but also the soundtrack by Philippe Rombi".

Moira Macdonald of The Seattle Times called the film's director a "master of mood", while Variety's David Rooney called the film a "sophisticated [and] unpredictable mystery". The Oregonian critic Marc Mohan praised the film, writing: "In its own slightly disturbing way, this psychological thriller serves as an absorbing diversion without sapping brain cells—almost the perfect summer movie for smart people."

Anthony Quinn of The Independent was less impressed by the film, awarding it a two out of five star-rating, noting that the tension between the two leads is "nicely poised" but criticizing the film for its lack of shock value and suspense. Peter Bradshaw of The Guardian made similar observations, summarizing: "It's well performed and everything looks terrifically stylish and elegant, but the movie is let down by an absurd ending, allegedly about creativity, imagination and the writing process. It simply leaves the audience with the uncomfortable feeling that their attention has been trifled with for an hour and a half."

=== Accolades ===
Award/association	Year	Category	Recipient(s) and nominee(s)	Result	Ref.
Boston Society of Film Critics Awards	2003	Best Actress	Ludivine Sagnier	Nominated	
Cannes Film Festival	2003	Palme d'Or	Swimming Pool	Nominated	
César Awards	2004	Best Actress	Charlotte Rampling	Nominated	
César Awards	2004	Best Supporting Actress	Ludivine Sagnier	Nominated	
Chlotrudis Society for Independent Films	2003	Best Actress	Charlotte Rampling	Nominated	
Chlotrudis Society for Independent Films	2003	Best Supporting Actress	Ludivine Sagnier	Nominated	
Critics Choice Awards	2003	Best Foreign Film	Swimming Pool	Nominated	
Dallas-Fort Worth Film Critics Association Awards	2003	Best Supporting Actress	Ludivine Sagnier	Nominated	
European Film Awards	2003	Best Film	Swimming Pool	Nominated	
European Film Awards	2003	Best Actress	Charlotte Rampling	Won	
European Film Awards	2003	Best Director – People's Choice	François Ozon	Nominated	
European Film Awards	2003	Best Actress – People's Choice	Charlotte Rampling	Nominated	
European Film Awards	2003	Best Actress – People's Choice	Ludivine Sagnier	Nominated	
London Film Critics' Circle	2004	British Actress of the Year	Charlotte Rampling	Nominated	
London Film Critics' Circle	2004	Foreign Language Film of the Year	Swimming Pool	Nominated	
Seattle Film Critics Awards	2004	Best Actress	Charlotte Rampling	Nominated	
