= Lemming (film) =

- Theatrical release poster
- Directed by: Dominik Moll
- Written by: Gilles Marchand; Dominik Moll
- Produced by: Dominik Moll
- Starring: Laurent Lucas; Charlotte Gainsbourg; Charlotte Rampling; André Dussollier; Jacques Bonnaffé; Véronique Affholder
- Cinematography: Jean-Marc Fabre
- Edited by: Mike Fromentin
- Music by: David Whitaker
- Distributed by: Diaphana Films
- Release date: 11 May 2005
- Running time: 129 minutes
- Country: France
- Language: French
- Budget: €5.3 million
- Box office: $800,000

Lemming is a 2005 French psychological thriller film directed by Dominik Moll and starring André Dussollier, Charlotte Rampling, Charlotte Gainsbourg and Laurent Lucas. It was entered into the 2005 Cannes Film Festival.

== Plot ==
Alain Getty is a Home Automation Engineer who accepts a job in the south of France to work on a small camera drone in a technology company owned by Richard Pollock, and moves to a suburb of Toulouse with his wife Bénédicte.

After three months, Richard invites himself and his wife Alice to dinner at Alain's house. They arrive late and create a scene with their marital problems; Alice is very rude to Bénédicte. Alain discovers a rodent lodged in the S-bend of the kitchen sink, which recovers after Alain retrieves it. A veterinarian identifies it as a lemming, a Scandinavian animal that does not live in France in the wild.

The next evening Alice visits Alain, working late at his office. She says that Richard once tried to kill her and that the only reason she is still with him is to see him die. She attempts to seduce Alain, who resists her advances, but doesn't tell Bénédicte about the incident. Alice visits Bénédicte alone, and alludes to having had sex with Alain, before saying she feels tired. Bénédicte shows her the guest bedroom, where she creates a mess and eventually shoots herself. Bénédicte feels an urge to spend the night in the guestroom where Alice committed suicide.

Despite Alice's death, Richard and Alain go on a business trip to Biarritz the next day. During the drive, Alain asks Richard if he had really tried to kill Alice. In response, Richard asks Alain if he and Alice had sex, which Alain denies. That evening, Alain calls Bénédicte, who initially doesn't answer, then abuses him. Concerned, Alain decides to drive home immediately, although it is late and he is tired. He finds Bénédicte sleeping and is unable to wake her. He hears noises coming from the kitchen, discovers it is full of lemmings and faints. Alain wakes up in a hospital; he crashed after falling asleep at the wheel, and the previous night's events were apparently a dream.

Upon Alain's release from the hospital, he and Bénédicte visit Richard's lakeside holiday chalet. Bénédicte continues to behave coldly. She asks why Alain hadn't told her about Alice's attempt to seduce him, using the exact words Alice used that night and asks Alain to call her "Alice". They have sex and Alain falls asleep. When he wakes, Bénédicte and their car are gone. Alain hitches a ride home and discovers that Bénédicte started an affair with Richard while he was in hospital and is about to move into his house. Alain uses his drone to observe Richard's house, and finds Bénédicte as expected. As Richard and Bénédicte are about to have sex, the camera fails. It appears that Alice has taken control of Bénédicte and resumed her life with Richard inside Bénédicte's body. Meanwhile, the vet returns the lemming to Alain's house. The lemming bites Alain and disappears in the house.

The next day, Richard confronts Alain at work with pieces of the drone he found in the garden. That evening, "Alice-Bénédicte" visits Alain to offer him a deal: If he kills Richard, he would get Bénédicte back. She gives Alain the key to Richard's house and leaves. That night Alain goes to Richard's house. He finds Richard and "Alice-Bénédicte" asleep in the bedroom, and smothers Richard with a pillow while "Alice-Bénédicte" watches. Alain carries Richard's body to the kitchen, where he operates the coffee-machine and the gas stove. "Alice-Bénédicte" follows him to the car in a trance-like state. Back at their house, "Alice-Bénédicte" goes straight to bed. When she wakes up, she is Bénédicte again—she says she dreamt of Alice, but doesn't remember any of the recent events.

The next day, the couple are in their garden when they receive news of Richard's apparent suicide by causing a gas explosion in his house. Bénédicte innocently asks Alain if he believes Richard committed suicide because of Alice's death. She then discovers the dead lemming and throws it away. The mystery of its origin is resolved by Alain in a voice over: Their neighbours' son had brought the animal from a family holiday to Finland; his upset father then flushed it down the toilet. Finally, Alain mentions that Bénédicte is pregnant.

== Cast ==
- Laurent Lucas as Alain Getty
- Charlotte Gainsbourg as Bénédicte Getty
- Charlotte Rampling as Alice Pollock
- André Dussollier as Richard Pollock
- Jacques Bonnaffé as Nicolas Chevalier
- Véronique Affholder as Francine
- Michel Cassagne as Le vétérinaire
- Florence Desille as L'infirmière
- Emmanuel Gayet as Le médecin de garde
- Félix Gonzales as Félix, le fils du voisin
- Nicolas Jouhet as L'employé des eaux
- Fabrice Robert as Bruno

== Production ==
Filming began on 1 July 2004 in the Île-de-France region. On 31 August, filming began in the Pyrenees region. Shooting took place in Toulouse, at a villa in the hills of Pech David, from 8 to 16 September. Scenes were also shot on the shores of the Lac de Bious-Artigues, located in the Pyrénées-Atlantiques department.

== Reception ==
The film has received generally positive reviews from critics. Review aggregation website Rotten Tomatoes gives it a 73% approval rating, based on 48 reviews, with an average score of 6.7/10. The site's consensus reads, "A creepy psychological thriller, with superb performances and natural tension flowing from every frame, Lemming is a worthy successor to Dominik Moll's With A Friend Like Harry". At Metacritic, which assigns a normalized rating out of 100 to reviews from mainstream critics, the film received an average score of 65, based on 16 reviews, indicating "generally favorable reviews".

== Accolades ==
Award / Film Festival	Category	Recipients and nominees	Result
Cannes Film Festival	Palme d'Or		Nominated
César Awards	Best Supporting Actress	Charlotte Rampling	Nominated
European Film Awards	People's Choice Award for Best Actress	Charlotte Rampling	Nominated
