= Viva la vie =

- Directed by: Claude Lelouch
- Written by: Claude Lelouch; Jérôme Tonnerre
- Starring: Charlotte Rampling; Michel Piccoli; Jean-Louis Trintignant
- Cinematography: Bernard Lutic
- Edited by: Hugues Darmois; Pauline Leroy
- Music by: Didier Barbelivien
- Distributed by: UGC Distribution
- Release date: 1984
- Running time: 110 minutes
- Country: France
- Language: French

Viva la vie is a 1984 French film directed by Claude Lelouch.

== Cast and roles ==
- Charlotte Rampling - Catherine Perrin
- Michel Piccoli - Michel Perrin
- Jean-Louis Trintignant - François Gaucher
- Évelyne Bouix - Sarah Gaucher
- Charles Aznavour - Edouard Takvorian
- Laurent Malet - Laurent Perrin
- Tanya Lopert - Julia
- Raymond Pellegrin - Barret
- Serge Riaboukine - Barret's Assistant
- Charles Gérard - Charles
- Anouk Aimée - Anouk
- Myriam Boyer - Pauline
- Philippe Laudenbach - Professor Sternberg
- Corinne Touzet - Catherine's Friend
- Martin Lamotte - TV Journalist
- Patrick Depeyrrat - Taxidriver
- Marilyne Even - A Witness
- Denis Lavant - Caviar delivery man
