= Lac de Bious-Artigues =

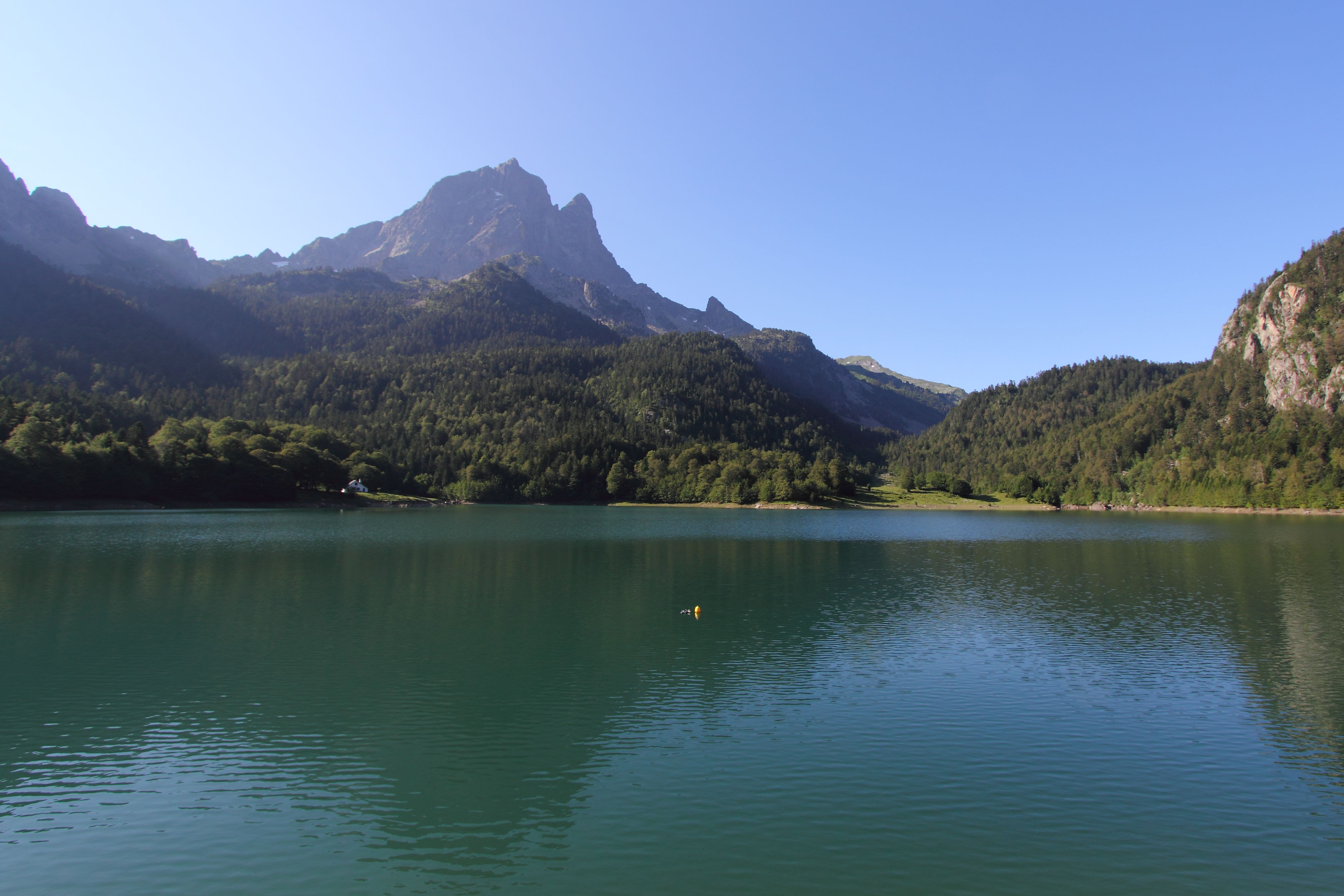
- The lake with the view on the Pic du Midi d'Ossau.

- Location within Pyrenees
- Location: Pyrénées-Atlantiques, Pyrénées
- Coordinates: 42°52′1″N 0°27′12″W
- Type: reservoir
- Basin countries: France
- Surface area: 0.326 km^{2} (0.126 sq mi)
- Max. depth: 40 m (130 ft)
- Surface elevation: 1,416 m (4,646 ft)

Lac de Bious-Artigues is a lake in the Pyrénées mountains in Pyrénées-Atlantiques, France. At an elevation of 1416 m, its surface area is 0.326 km². The lake is located within Pyrenees National Park in the Ossau Valley, within the French province of Béarn. The site offers a path around the lake, hiking trails throughout the area, fishing, and canoeing and swimming in the summer.

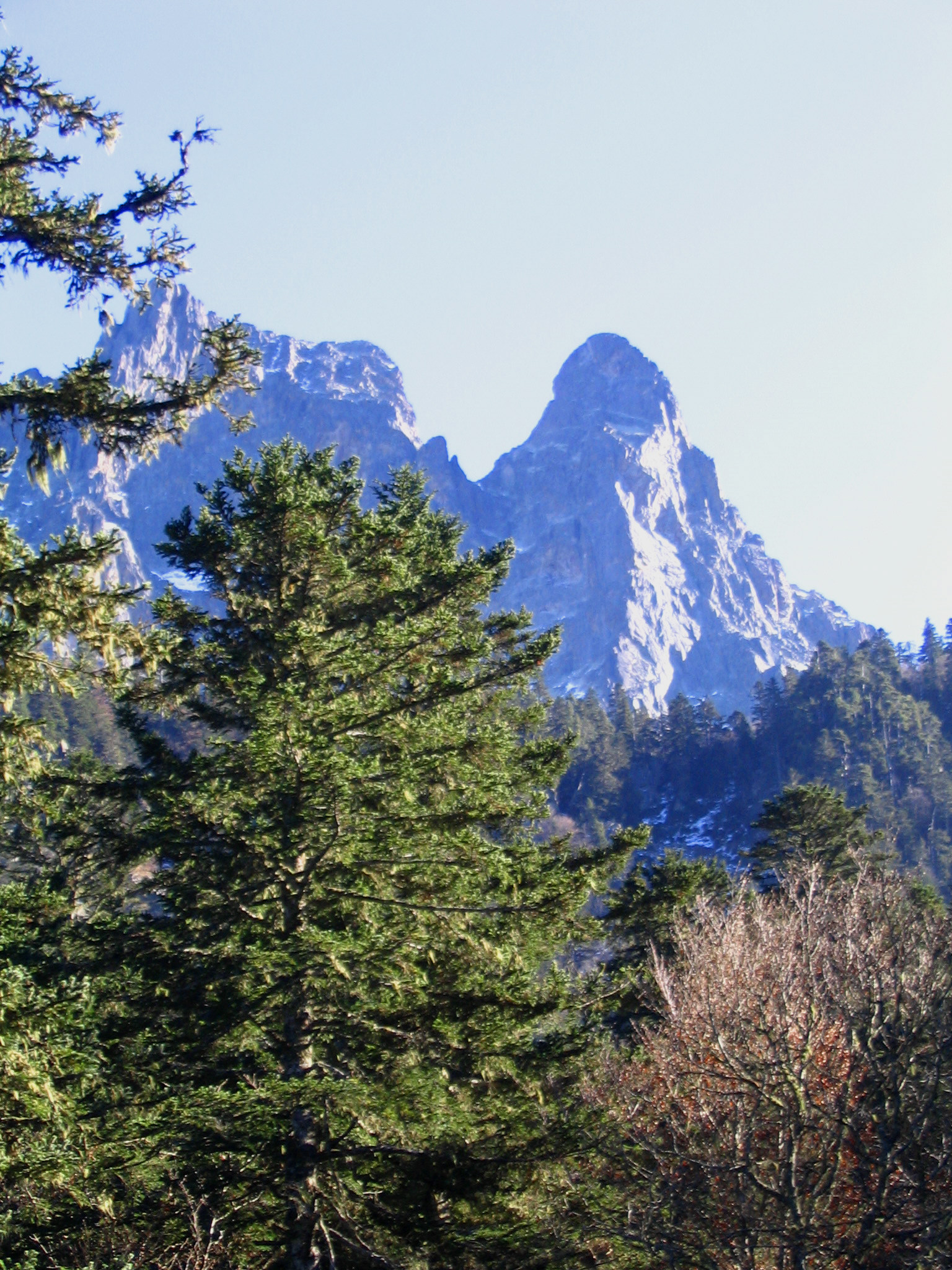
Pic du Midi d'Ossau seen from the lake

The lake boasts trout as the main catch for fishing, and the region is also home to marmots, griffon vultures, and Pyrenean chamois. The recommended months for hiking are June to September; these months are also suggested for lake activities since the water can be cold for swimming. In winter the area offers ski touring and snowshoeing.
