= Foxtrot (1976 film) =

1976 film

- Theatrical release poster
- Directed by: Arturo Ripstein
- Screenplay by: Arturo Ripstein; José Pacheco; H.A.L. Craig
- Produced by: Gerald Green
- Starring: Peter O'Toole; Charlotte Rampling; Max von Sydow; Jorge Luke; Helena Rojo; Claudio Brook; Anne Porterfield
- Cinematography: Alex Phillips
- Edited by: Peter Zinner
- Music by: Pete Rugolo
- Production companies: Carvold; Corporación Nacional Cinematográfica
- Distributed by: New World Pictures
- Release date: 1 March 1976
- Running time: 91 minutes
- Countries: United Kingdom; Mexico
- Language: English

Foxtrot (re-released in 1977 as The Far Side of Paradise) is a 1976 British-Mexican drama film directed by Arturo Ripstein and written by Ripstein, José Emilio Pacheco and H.A.L. Craig. It stars Peter O'Toole, Charlotte Rampling and Max von Sydow.

== Plot ==
On the eve of World War 2, decadent Rumanian aristocrat Liviu retreats to a desert island paradise with his wife Julia. When supplies to the island are cut off, his servant Larsen rebels against him.

== Cast ==
- Peter O'Toole as Liviu
- Charlotte Rampling as Julia
- Max von Sydow as Larsen
- Jorge Luke as Eusebio
- Helena Rojo as Alexandra
- Claudio Brook as Paul
- Max Kerlow as Captain
- Christa Walter as Gertrude
- Mario Castillón Bracho as sailor
- Anne Porterfield as Marianna

== Reception ==
The Hollywood Reporter wrote: "There is such an extraordinary visual elegance to Arturo Ripstein's Foxtrot that one is all too ready to believe, at the outset, that he is in the presence of a masterpiece. Everything works. ... As a visual and aural experience, Foxtrot is a masterwork. No picture could possibly look better, or feel better. ... Somewhere along the line – probably when their private world is invaded by the yachting party – Foxtrot slips its moorings. While it still looks marvelous, its intriguing personal story edges over into parable, and everything that happens acquires an added significance that it can't quite sustain. ... the film grows increasingly, disconcertingly detached from reality, until all you're really left with is a great look and the suave sound of Pete Rugolo's sophisticated score."

Variety wrote: "Foxtrot is a chic, stylish, but ultimately hollow Peter O'Toole starrer, made in Mexico ... Though the fancy shooting style of director Arturo Ripstein and lenser Alex Phillips Jr holds attention, pic often lapses from mild irony into cornball melodrama in the purple style of 1930s pix starring Kay Francis and Warren William. ... Ripstein makes the mistake of inviting comparison with similar themes in Jean Renoir's 1939 masterpiece The Rules Of The Game, but he lacks Renoir's generosity toward people, and the film remains content with scoring petty points against both aristocrats and servants. Von Sydow, particularly, has his talents wasted by this approach, making him a venal and uninteresting character."
