= The Cherry Orchard (1999 film) =

Adaptation of the Chekhov play

- Theatrical release poster
- Directed by: Michael Cacoyannis
- Written by: Michael Cacoyannis
- Based on: The Cherry Orchard by Anton Chekhov
- Starring: Charlotte Rampling; Alan Bates; Katrin Cartlidge; Owen Teale
- Cinematography: Aris Stavrou
- Edited by: Michael Cacoyannis; Takis Hadzis
- Production companies: Melanda Films Production; Amanda Productions; Les Films de l'Astre
- Distributed by: Kino Lorber
- Release dates: January 24, 2000 (France); February 22, 2002 (United States)
- Running time: 141 minutes
- Countries: Greece; Chypre; France
- Language: English
- Budget: $5 million
- Box office: $135,280

The Cherry Orchard is a 1999 period drama film directed and written by Michael Cacoyannis, and starring Charlotte Rampling, Alan Bates, Katrin Cartlidge, and Owen Teale. The supporting cast includes Xander Berkeley, Gerard Butler, Melanie Lynskey, and Frances de la Tour. It is based on the 1904 play The Cherry Orchard by Anton Chekhov, and was an English-language co-production between Cyprus, France and Germany.

== Main cast ==
- Charlotte Rampling as Madame Lubov Andreievna Ranyevskaya
- Alan Bates as Leonid Andreievitch Gayev
- Owen Teale as Yermolai Alexeievitch Lopakhin
- Katrin Cartlidge as Varvara "Varya" Mihailovna
- Tushka Bergen as Anya
- Xander Berkeley as Epihodov
- Gerard Butler as Yasha
- Andrew Howard as Pyotr Sergeyevitch "Petya" Trofimov
- Melanie Lynskey as Dunyasha
- Ian McNeice as Semyon Semyonovich Pishchik
- Frances de la Tour as Charlotta Ivanovna
- Michael Gough as Feers
- Dalia-Nikol Urumova as Child
