= Boston Society of Film Critics Award for Best Actress =

Annual US film award

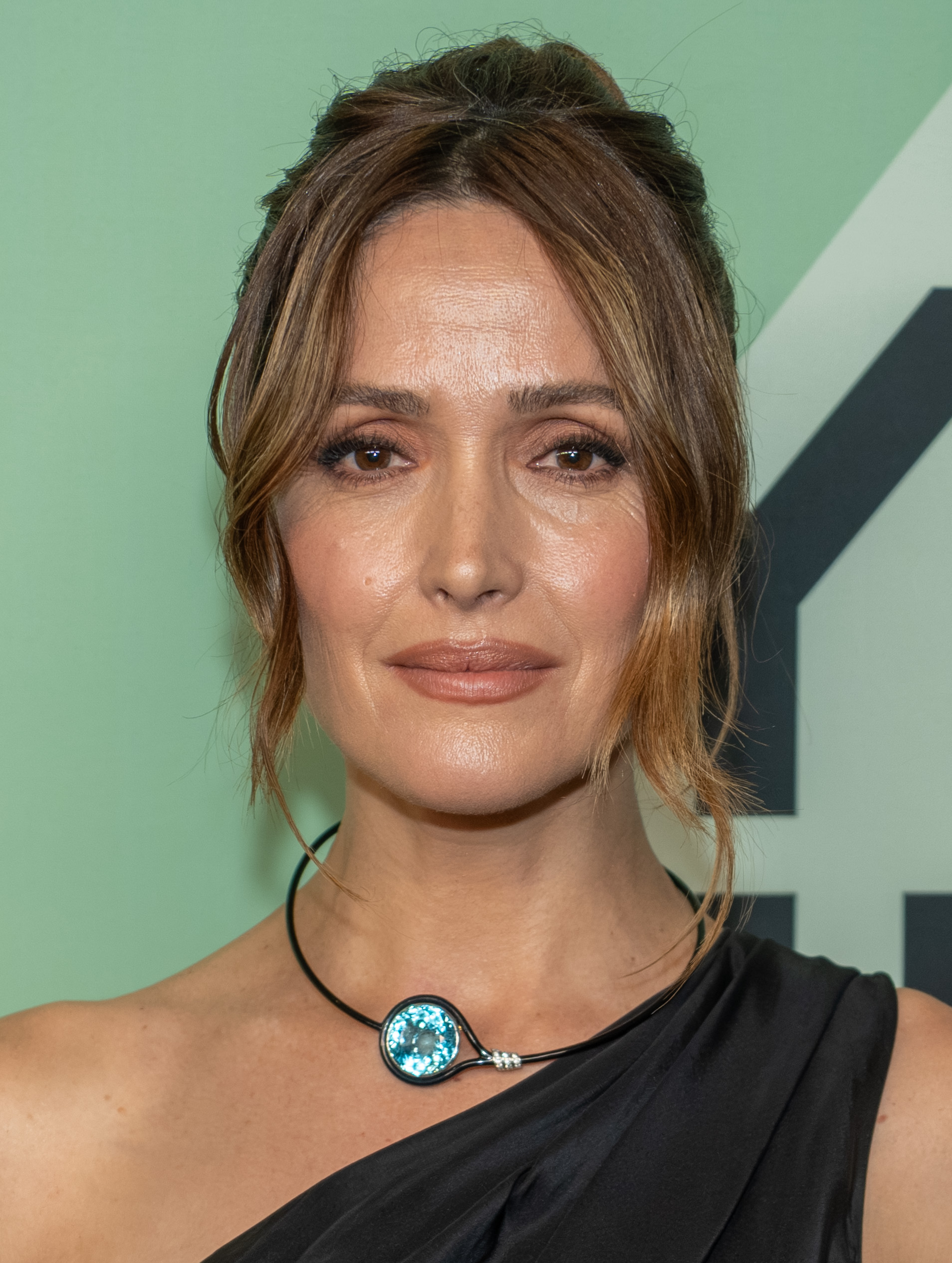
- Current recipient: Rose Byrne
- Awarded for: Best Performance by an Actress in a Leading Role
- Country: United States
- Presented by: Boston Society of Film Critics
- First award: Gena Rowlands; Gloria (1980)
- Currently held by: Rose Byrne; If I Had Legs I'd Kick You (2025)
- Website: bostonfilmcritics.org

The Boston Society of Film Critics Award for Best (Lead) Actress is one of the annual film awards given by the Boston Society of Film Critics.

== Winners ==
=== 1980s ===
Year	Winner	Film	Role
1980	Gena Rowlands	Gloria	Gloria Swenson
1981	Marília Pêra	Pixote (Pixote: a lei do mais fraco)	Sueli
1982	Meryl Streep	Sophie's Choice	Sophie Zawistowski
1983	Rosanna Arquette	Baby It's You	Jill Rosen
1984	Judy Davis	A Passage to India	Adela Quested
1985	Geraldine Page	The Trip to Bountiful	Carrie Watts
1986	Chloe Webb	Sid and Nancy	Nancy Spungen
1987	Holly Hunter	Broadcast News	Jane Craig
1988	Melanie Griffith	Working Girl	Tess McGill
1989	Jessica Tandy	Driving Miss Daisy	Daisy Werthan

=== 1990s ===
Year	Winner	Film	Role
1990	Anjelica Huston	The Grifters	Lilly Dillon
1990	Anjelica Huston	The Witches	Eva Ernst / Grand High Witch
1991	Geena Davis	Thelma & Louise	Thelma Dickinson
1992	Emma Thompson	Howards End	Margaret "Meg" Schlegel
1993	Holly Hunter	The Piano	Ada McGrath
1994	Julianne Moore	Vanya on 42nd Street	Yelena
1995	Nicole Kidman	To Die For	Suzanne Stone Maretto
1996	Brenda Blethyn	Secrets & Lies	Cynthia Rose Purley
1997	Helena Bonham Carter	The Wings of the Dove	Kate Croy
1998	Samantha Morton	Under the Skin	Iris Kelly
1999	Hilary Swank	Boys Don't Cry	Brandon Teena

=== 2000s ===
Year	Winner	Film	Role
2000	Ellen Burstyn	Requiem for a Dream	Sara Goldfarb
2001	Tilda Swinton	The Deep End	Margaret Hall
2002	Maggie Gyllenhaal	Secretary	Lee Holloway
2003	Scarlett Johansson	Lost in Translation	Charlotte
2004	Hilary Swank	Million Dollar Baby	Margaret "Maggie" Fitzgerald
2005	Reese Witherspoon	Walk the Line	June Carter Cash
2006	Helen Mirren	The Queen	Queen Elizabeth II
2007	Marion Cotillard	La Vie en Rose (La môme)	Édith Piaf
2008	Sally Hawkins	Happy-Go-Lucky	Pauline "Poppy" Cross
2009	Meryl Streep	Julie & Julia	Julia Child

=== 2010s ===
Year	Winner	Film	Role
2010	Natalie Portman	Black Swan	Nina Sayers / The Swan Queen
2011	Michelle Williams	My Week with Marilyn	Marilyn Monroe
2012	Emmanuelle Riva	Amour	Anne Laurent
2013	Cate Blanchett	Blue Jasmine	Jeanette "Jasmine" Francis
2014	Marion Cotillard	The Immigrant	Ewa Cybulska
2014	Marion Cotillard	Two Days, One Night	Sandra Bya
2015	Charlotte Rampling	45 Years	Kate Mercer
2016	Isabelle Huppert	Elle	Michèle Leblanc
2016	Isabelle Huppert	Things to Come	Nathalie Chazeaux
2017	Sally Hawkins	The Shape of Water	Elisa Esposito
2018	Melissa McCarthy	Can You Ever Forgive Me?	Lee Israel
2019	Saoirse Ronan	Little Women	Josephine "Jo" March

=== 2020s ===
Year	Winner	Film	Role
2020	Sidney Flanigan	Never Rarely Sometimes Always	Autumn Callahan
2021	Alana Haim	Licorice Pizza	Alana Kane
2022	Michelle Yeoh	Everything Everywhere All At Once	Evelyn Wang
2023	Lily Gladstone	Killers of the Flower Moon	Mollie Kyle
2024	Mikey Madison	Anora	Anora "Ani" Mikheeva
2025	Rose Byrne	If I Had Legs I'd Kick You	Linda

== Multiple winners ==
=== 2 wins ===
- Holly Hunter (1987, 1993)
- Hilary Swank (1999, 2004)
- Meryl Streep (1982, 2009)
- Marion Cotillard (2007, 2014)
- Sally Hawkins (2008, 2017)
