= European Film Academy Lifetime Achievement Award =

The following is a list of the European Film Award winners for Lifetime Achievement:

== Winners ==
Year	Lifetime Achievement Award	Award of Merit Special Achievement Award	Honorary Award of the EFA President and Board
1988	♂ (Sweden) Ingmar Bergman	♂ (United Kingdom) Richard Attenborough	
1988	♂ (Italy) Marcello Mastroianni	♂ (United Kingdom) Richard Attenborough	
1989	♂ (Italy) Federico Fellini		
1990	♂ (Poland) Andrzej Wajda		
1991	♂ (Hungary) / (France) Alexandre Trauner		
1992	♂ (Poland) / (United States) Billy Wilder		
1993	♂ (Italy) Michelangelo Antonioni		
1994	♂ (France) Robert Bresson		
1995	♂ (France) Marcel Carné		
1996	♂ (United Kingdom) Alec Guinness		
1997	♀ (France) Jeanne Moreau		
1998		♂ (United Kingdom) Jeremy Irons	
1999	♂ (Italy) Ennio Morricone		
2000	♂ (Republic of Ireland) Richard Harris		
2001	♂ (United Kingdom) Monty Python		
2002	♂ (Italy) Tonino Guerra		
2003	♂ (France) Claude Chabrol		
2004	♂ (Spain) Carlos Saura		
2005	♂ (United Kingdom) Sean Connery		
2006	♂ (Poland) / (France) Roman Polanski		
2007	♂ (France) Jean-Luc Godard		♂ (Portugal) Manoel de Oliveira
2008	♀ (United Kingdom) Judi Dench		
2009	♂ (United Kingdom) Ken Loach		
2010	♂ (Switzerland) Bruno Ganz		
2011	♂ (United Kingdom) Stephen Frears		♂ (France) Michel Piccoli
2012	♂ (Italy) Bernardo Bertolucci		
2013	♀ (France) Catherine Deneuve		
2014	♀ (Belgium) / (France) Agnès Varda		
2015	♀ (United Kingdom) Charlotte Rampling		♂ (United Kingdom) Michael Caine
2016	♂ (France) Jean-Claude Carrière		♂ (Poland) Andrzej Wajda
2017	♂ (Russia) Aleksandr Sokurov		
2018	♀ (Spain) Carmen Maura		♂ (Greece) / (France) Costa-Gavras
2019	♂ (Germany) Werner Herzog		
2021	♀ (Hungary) Márta Mészáros		
2022	♀ (Germany) Margarethe von Trotta		
2023	♀ (United Kingdom) Vanessa Redgrave		♂ (Hungary) Béla Tarr
2024	♂ (Germany) Wim Wenders		
2025	♀ (Norway) Liv Ullmann		
