= Hannah (2017 film) =

2017 film

- Film poster
- Directed by: Andrea Pallaoro
- Written by: Andrea Pallaoro; Orlando Tirado
- Starring: Charlotte Rampling
- Cinematography: Chayse Irvin
- Edited by: Paola Freddi
- Music by: Michel Bisceglia
- Release dates: 8 September 2017 (Venice); 15 February 2018 (Italy)
- Running time: 95 minutes
- Countries: Italy; France; Belgium
- Language: French

Hannah is a 2017 Italian drama film directed by Andrea Pallaoro. It was screened in the main competition section of the 74th Venice International Film Festival. At Venice, Charlotte Rampling won the Volpi Cup for Best Actress.

== Cast ==
- Charlotte Rampling as Hannah
- André Wilms as Hannah's Husband
- Luca Avallone as Albert
- Jean-Michel Balthazar as Chris
- Fatou Traoré Theater Teacher
- Jessica Fanhan Subway Fighting Woman
- Ambra Mattioli Singer

== Reception ==
On review aggregator website Rotten Tomatoes, the film holds an approval rating of 82% based on 38 reviews, and an average rating of 6.90/10. The website's critical consensus states: "Hannah rests almost completely on Charlotte Rampling's lead performance -- and her outstanding work proves more than capable of bearing the weight". On Metacritic, the film has a weighted average score of 63 out of 100, based on 9 critics, indicating "generally favorable reviews".
