= Charlotte Rampling =

English actress (born 1946)

Charlotte Rampling OBE
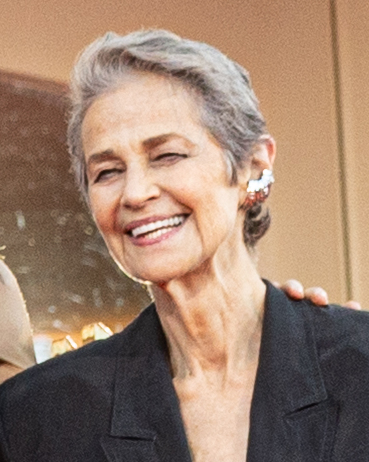
- Rampling in 2025
- Born: Tessa Charlotte Rampling; 5 February 1946 (age 80); Sturmer, Essex, England
- Occupations: Actress; model; singer
- Years active: 1963–present
- Works: Full list
- Spouses: Bryan Southcombe (m. 1972; div. 1976) Jean-Michel Jarre (m. 1978; div. 1997)
- Partner(s): Jean-Noël Tassez (1998–2015; his death)
- Children: 2
- Relatives: Godfrey Rampling (father)
- Awards: Full list

Tessa Charlotte Rampling (born 5 February 1946) is an English actress. An icon of the Swinging Sixties, she began her career as a model. She was cast in the role of Meredith in the 1966 film Georgy Girl, which starred Lynn Redgrave. She soon began making French and Italian arthouse films, notably Luchino Visconti's The Damned (1969) and Liliana Cavani's The Night Porter (1974). She went on to star in many European and English-language films, including Stardust Memories (1980), The Verdict (1982), Long Live Life (1984), and The Wings of the Dove (1997). In the 2000s, she became the muse of French director François Ozon, appearing in several of his films, notably Under the Sand (2000), Swimming Pool (2003) and Young & Beautiful (2013). On television, she is known for her role as Dr. Evelyn Vogel in Dexter (2013).

In 2002, Rampling released an album of recordings in the style of cabaret, Like a Woman. In 2012 she was nominated for a Primetime Emmy Award and a Screen Actors Guild Award, both for her performance in the miniseries Restless. For her performance in the 2015 film 45 Years, she won the Berlin Film Festival Award for Best Actress, the European Film Award for Best Actress, and was nominated for the Academy Award for Best Actress.

In 2017, Rampling won the Volpi Cup for Best Actress at the 74th Venice International Film Festival for Hannah. She received an Honorary César in 2001 and France's Legion of Honour in 2002. She was made an OBE in 2000 for her services to the arts, and received the 2015 Lifetime Achievement Award from the European Film Awards. In 2015, Rampling released her autobiography, which she wrote in French, titled Qui Je Suis. She later worked with William Hobson on the English translation, Who I Am, which was published in March 2017.

== Early life ==
Rampling was born in 1946 in Sturmer, Essex, the daughter of Isabel Anne (née Gurteen; 1918–2001), a painter, and Godfrey Rampling (1909–2009), an Olympic gold medallist runner and British Army officer. She spent most of her early life in Gibraltar, France and Spain, before she returned to the UK in 1964.

She attended Académie Jeanne d'Arc in Versailles and St Hilda's School, a boarding school in Bushey, Hertfordshire, England. She had one sister, Sarah, who died by suicide in 1967, aged 23. She and Sarah had a close relationship and they had performed in a cabaret act together during their young years.

== Career ==
=== 1960s: Modelling career, starting as actress ===
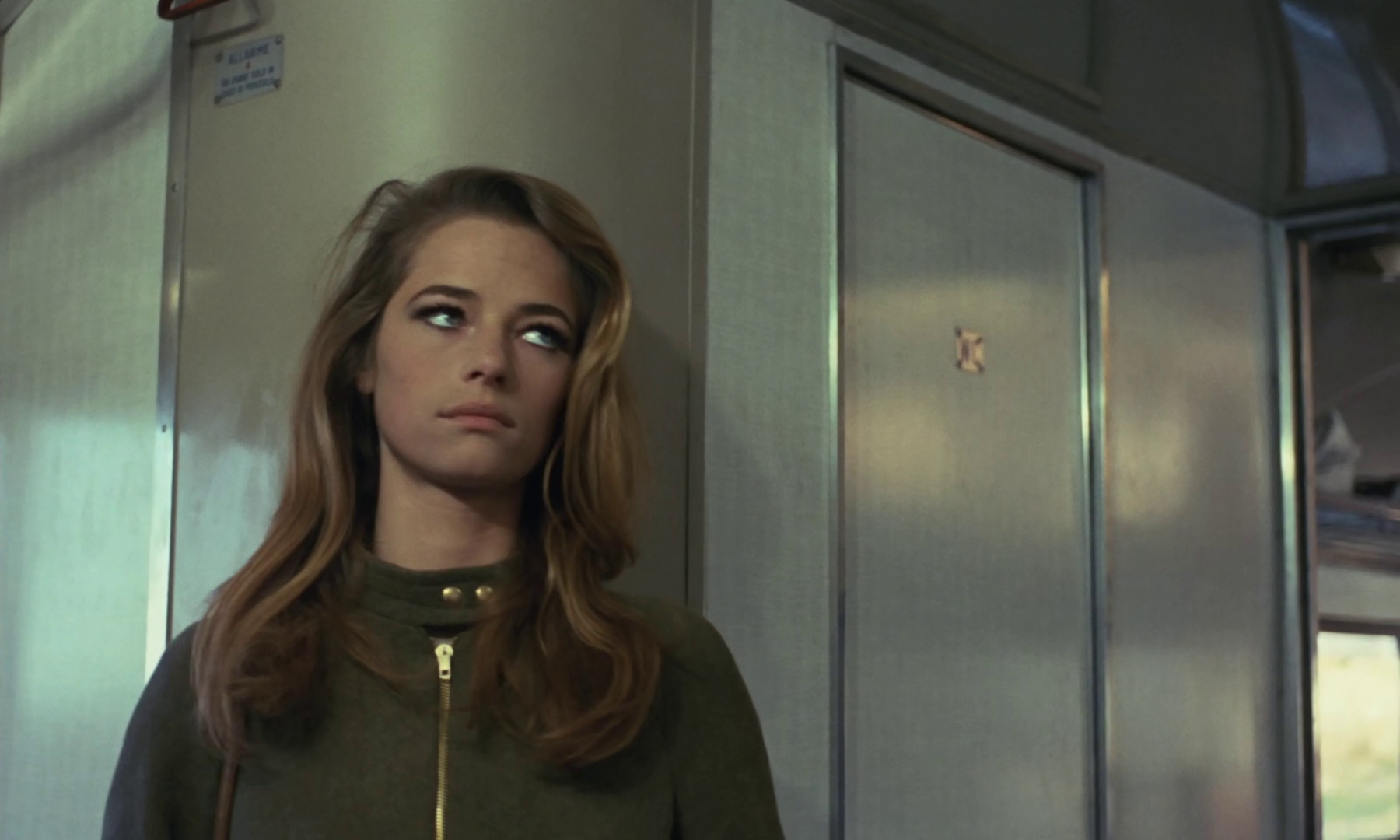
Rampling in 1968's Sardinia Kidnapped

Rampling made her stage debut at the age of 14, singing French chansons with her sister at Bernays Institute in Stanmore. She began her career as a model and first appeared in a Cadbury advertisement. She was working as a secretary when she was noticed by a casting agent in the same building. She made uncredited appearances in two films directed by Richard Lester including his first film with the Beatles, A Hard Day's Night (1964), and as a water skier in The Knack ...and How to Get It (1965). In 1965, she was cast in the role of Meredith in the film Georgy Girl and was given a role by John Boulting in the comedy Rotten to the Core. In 1967, she starred opposite Yul Brynner in the adventure film The Long Duel. She also appeared alongside Franco Nero in the Italian film Sardinia Kidnapped (Sequestro di persona) (1968), directed by Gianfranco Mingozzi.

On television, Rampling played the gunfighter Hana Wilde in "The Superlative Seven", a 1967 episode of The Avengers in which she knocked out John Steed. In 1969, she starred opposite Sam Waterston in the romance-drama Three, and in 1972, she starred opposite Robert Blake in the drama Corky and portrayed Anne Boleyn in the costume drama Henry VIII and His Six Wives. After this, her career flourished and she found notable work in both English and French cinema.

Despite an early flurry of success, she told The Independent: "We weren't happy. It was a nightmare, breaking the rules and all that. Everyone seemed to be having fun, but they were taking so many drugs they wouldn't know it anyway."

Rampling has performed controversial roles. In 1969, in Luchino Visconti's The Damned (La Caduta degli dei), she played a young wife sent to a Nazi concentration camp. Critics praised her performance, and it cast her in a whole new image: mysterious, sensitive, and ultimately tragic. "The Look", as her co-star Dirk Bogarde called it, became her trademark.

=== 1970–early 1980s: Mature roles, Hollywood, and Italian cinema ===
She appeared in the cult classic Vanishing Point, in a scene deleted from the U.S. theatrical release (included in the U.K. release). Lead actor Barry Newman remarked that the scene was of aid in the allegorical lilt of the film.

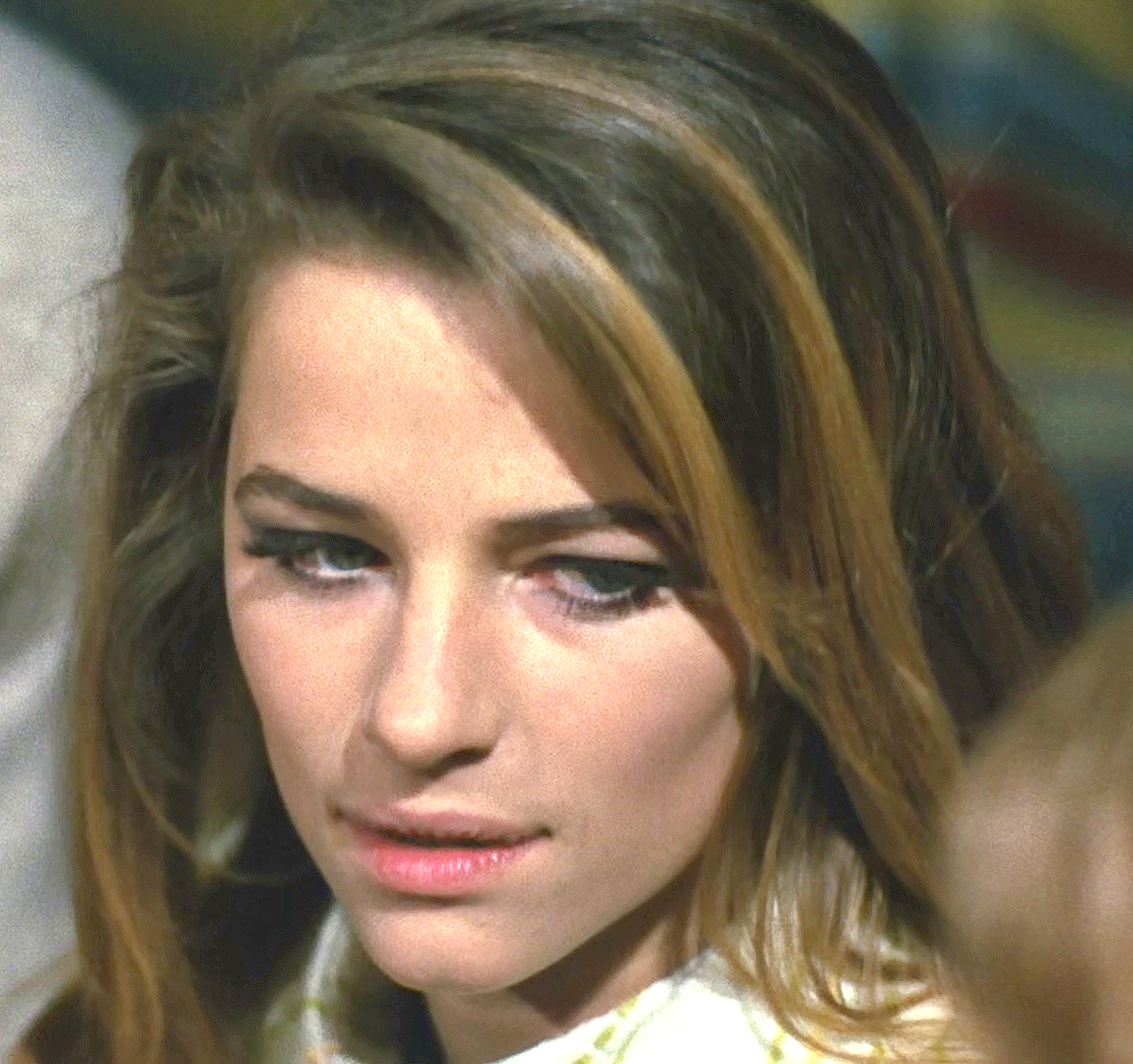
Rampling in 1968

In 1974's The Night Porter, in which she again appears alongside Dirk Bogarde, she plays a former concentration camp inmate who, after World War II, reunites with a former camp guard (Bogarde) with whom she had had an ambiguous, sadomasochistic relationship. Their relationship resumes, and she becomes his mistress and victim once again. In 1974, she posed nude for Playboy photographs by Helmut Newton. In 1976 she co-presented for Best Art Direction-Set Decoration Award with Anthony Hopkins at the 48th Academy Awards.

In 1974, Rampling starred in John Boorman's science-fiction film Zardoz opposite Sean Connery. She also starred with Peter O'Toole in Foxtrot (1976) and with Richard Harris in Orca (1977). She gained recognition from American audiences as the leading lady in a well-received remake of Raymond Chandler's detective story Farewell, My Lovely (1975) starring Robert Mitchum as Philip Marlowe, and later with Woody Allen's Stardust Memories (1980), and in The Verdict (1982), an acclaimed drama directed by Sidney Lumet that starred Paul Newman.

In 1978 director Clive Donner cast David Bowie and Rampling in a film to be called Wally, centered around Egon Schiele and his relationship with his lover Wally Neuzil, however due to absence of funding the project never materialised.

=== Middle 1980s and 1990s ===
Rampling starred in Claude Lelouch's 1984 film Viva la vie (Long Live Life), before going on to star in the cult-film Max mon amour (1986), and appear in the thriller Angel Heart (1987). For a decade she withdrew from the public eye due to depression. In the late 1990s, she appeared in The Wings of the Dove (1997), played Miss Havisham in a BBC television adaptation of Great Expectations (1998), and starred in the film adaptation of Anton Chekov’s The Cherry Orchard (1999), directed by Michael Cacoyannis.. In 1997, she was a jury member at the 54th Venice International Film Festival.

=== 2000s ===
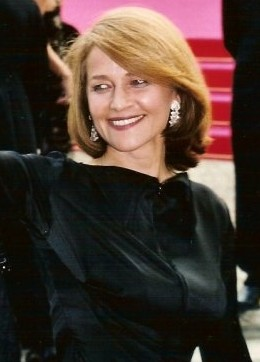
Rampling at the 2001 Cannes Film Festival

Rampling credits François Ozon with drawing her back to film in the 2000s, a period when she came to terms with the death of her elder sister, Sarah, who after having given birth prematurely in 1966, had died by suicide at 23. She told The Guardian: "I thought that after such a long time of not letting her be with me. I would like to bring her back into my life." The character she played in Ozon's Swimming Pool (2003), Sarah Morton, was named in her sister's honour.

For most of Rampling's life, she said that her sister had died of a brain haemorrhage; when she and her father learned of Sarah’s death, they agreed they would never let her mother know the truth. They kept their secret until Rampling's mother died in 2001.

Rampling appeared in Tony Scott's Spy Game (2001), and she earned César Award nominations for Under the Sand (2000), Swimming Pool (2003), and Lemming (2005). At 59, she appeared in Laurent Cantet's Heading South (Vers le Sud), a 2005 film about sexual tourism. She appeared as Ellen, a professor of French literature, who holidays in 1970s Haiti to get the sexual attention she does not get at home.

Hideo Kojima used Rampling's likeness for The Boss, the main antagonist of his game Metal Gear Solid 3: Snake Eater, released in 2004.

On her choice of roles, Rampling said "I generally don't make films to entertain people. I choose the parts that challenge me to break through my own barriers. A need to devour, punish, humiliate or surrender seems to be a primal part of human nature, and it's certainly a big part of sex. To discover what normal means, you have to surf a tide of weirdness."

The actress has continued to work in sexually provocative films, such as Basic Instinct 2 (2006). In 2008, she portrayed Countess Spencer, the mother of Keira Knightley's title character, in The Duchess and played the High Priestess in post-apocalyptic thriller Babylon A.D. In 2002, she recorded an album titled Comme Une Femme, or As A Woman. It is in both French and English, and includes passages that are spoken word as well as selections which Rampling sang.. In February 2006, Rampling was named as the jury president at the 56th Berlin International Film Festival.

She has been seen on the covers of Vogue, Interview and Elle, and CRUSHfanzine. In 2009, she posed nude in front of the Mona Lisa for Juergen Teller. In 2009, Rampling appeared in Todd Solondz's Life During Wartime.

=== 2010s ===
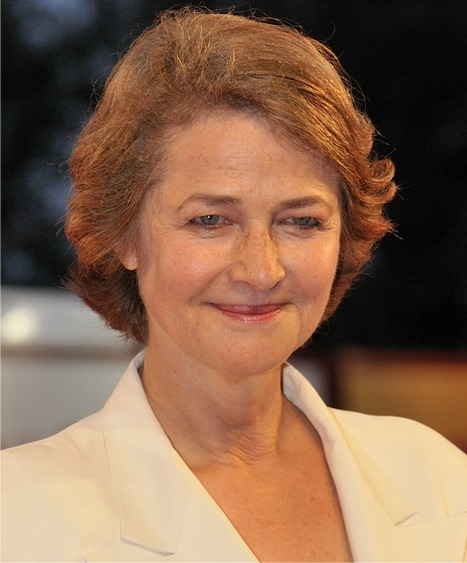
Rampling at the 66th Venice International Film Festival in 2009

In 2010, she completed filming Cleanskin, a terrorist thriller, and played Miss Emily in the dystopian romantic fantasy Never Let Me Go. She also appeared as Helena in the dance drama StreetDance 3D and the nun Mary in The Mill and the Cross with Michael York and Rutger Hauer. 2011 saw Rampling play Elizabeth Hunter in the Fred Schepisi directed adaptation of Australian Nobel laureate Patrick White's novel, The Eye of the Storm (with Judy Davis and Geoffrey Rush). In 2011 she also appeared in Lars Von Trier's Melancholia. For her role in the 2012 miniseries Restless, Rampling was nominated for a Primetime Emmy Award and a Screen Actors Guild Award. In 2013, she appeared as Dr. Evelyn Vogel in the eighth season of Dexter. Rampling also appeared as Alice in the drama Jeune et Jolie and the elderly Adriana do Prado in Night Train to Lisbon. Other television roles include the ITV drama Broadchurch (2015) and the BBC drama London Spy (2015). In 2014, she was named the new face of NARS Cosmetics to launch their new lipstick campaign.

In 2015, Rampling starred with Tom Courtenay in Andrew Haigh's 45 Years. The film is about a couple preparing to celebrate their 45th wedding anniversary when new information regarding the husband's missing previous lover arises. 45 Years was screened in the main competition section of the 65th Berlin International Film Festival. She won the Silver Bear for Best Actress and Tom Courtenay won the Silver Bear for Best Actor. For this role, she also won the Los Angeles Film Critics Association Award for Best Actress, the European Film Award for Best Actress, was nominated for the Academy Award for Best Actress, and also received nominations for the BIFA for Best Performance by an Actress in a British Independent Film and the Critics' Choice Movie Award for Best Actress.

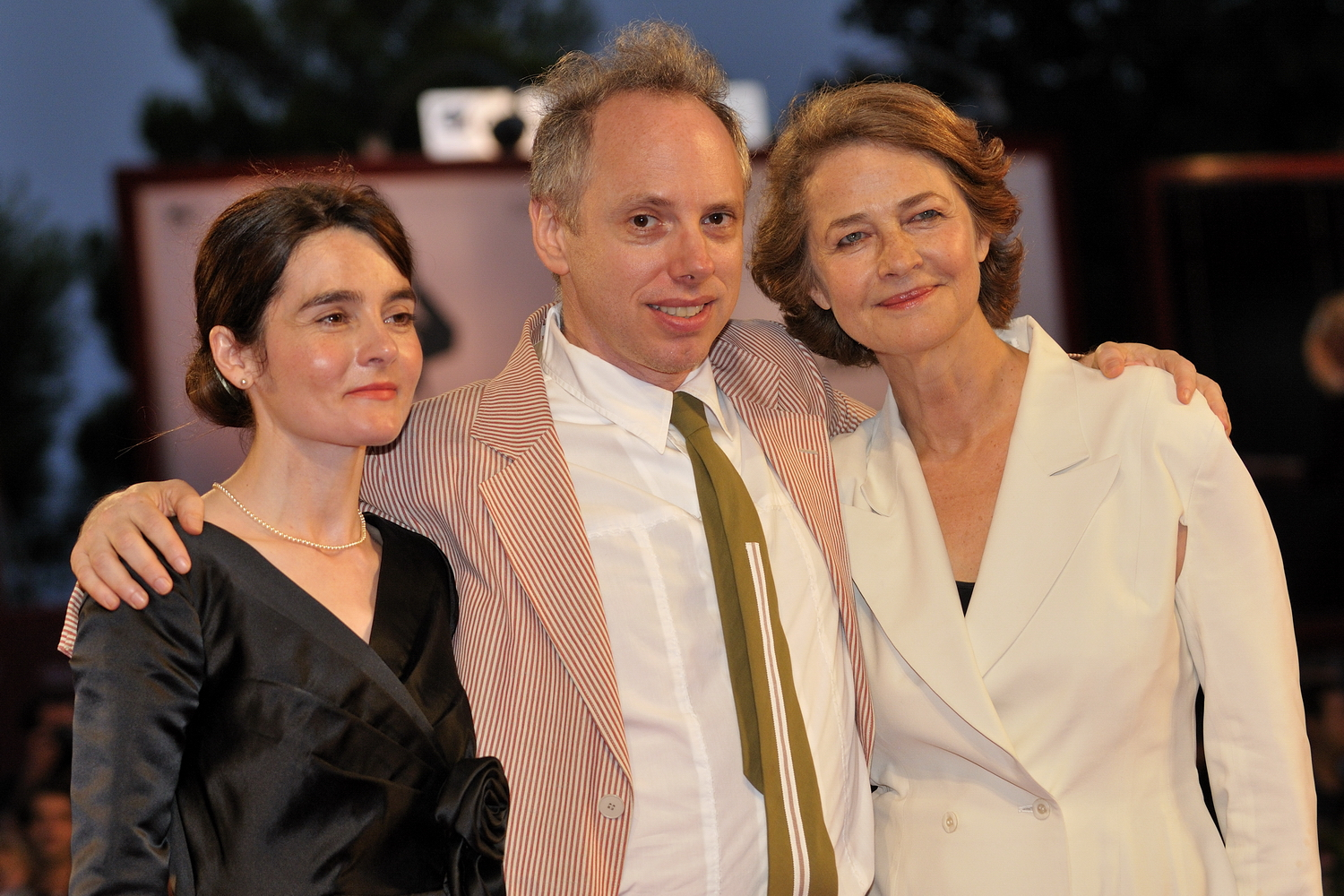
Shirley Henderson, Todd Solondz and Rampling at the Venice Film Festival in 2009

In 2016, Rampling said that efforts to boycott that year's Oscars ceremony over a lack of racial diversity among nominees were "racist to whites". Her comments were called "offensive, outrageous and ignorant" by Chelsea Clinton, although they were defended by Clint Eastwood. Rampling later apologised for her comments and expressed regret that her statements were misinterpreted.

That same year, Rampling backed children's fairytales app, GivingTales, in aid of UNICEF together with Roger Moore, Stephen Fry, Ewan McGregor, Joan Collins, Joanna Lumley, Michael Caine, David Walliams, Paul McKenna and Michael Ball.

In 2017, Rampling co-starred as Veronica Ford with Jim Broadbent and Emily Mortimer in The Sense of an Ending, based on the novel by Julian Barnes. It had its world premiere at the Palm Springs International Film Festival in January 2017. Her next film was in Andrea Pallaoro's Hannah, where she portrayed the title role of the wife of a man imprisoned on uncertain charges. For her role, she was awarded the Volpi Cup for Best Actress award at the 74th Venice International Film Festival.

In 2017, Rampling starred opposite Alicia Vikander and Eva Green in Euphoria, directed by Lisa Langseth.

=== 2020s ===
In January 2019, she was cast as Reverend Mother Gaius Helen Mohiam in the 2021 Denis Villeneuve film Dune. She reprised the role in the sequel, Dune: Part Two (2024). Rampling was originally cast as Lady Jessica in Alejandro Jodorowsky's failed adaptation of Dune in the 1970s, but left the project in disgust after reading a scene in the script where 2,000 extras defecated at once.

Rampling plays a grouchy grandmother in New Zealand writer-director Matthew J. Saville's 2021 black comedy Juniper.

== Personal life ==
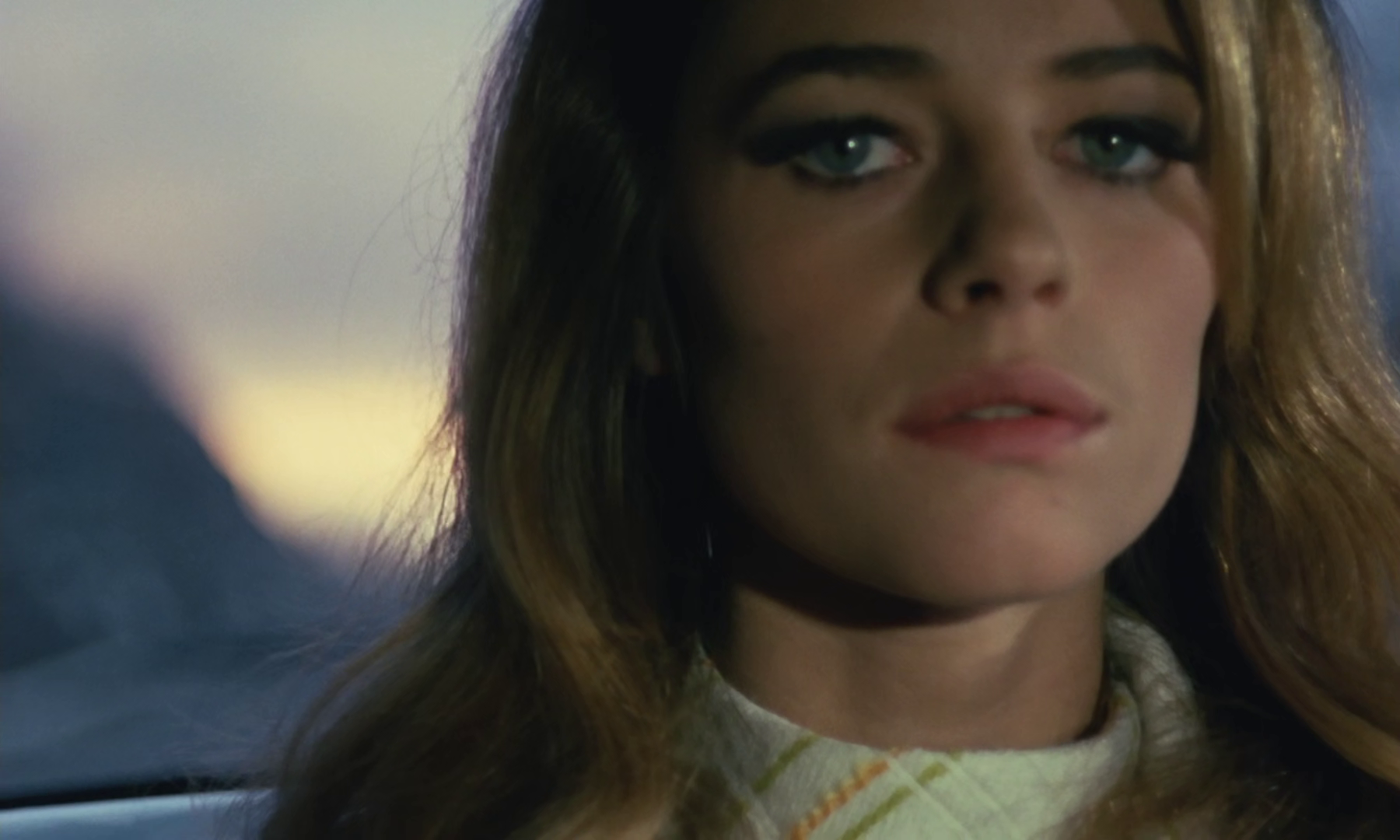
Rampling in 1968

In 1972, Rampling married New Zealand actor and publicist Bryan Southcombe and had a son, Barnaby Southcombe (who became a television director), before divorcing in 1976. The couple was reported to have been living in a ménage à trois with Randall Laurence, a male model, and in 1974, Rampling was quoted by the syndicated columnist Earl Wilson as saying: "There are so many misunderstandings in life. I once caused a scandal by saying I lived with two men...I didn't mean it in a sexual sense...I was just too dirty to clean my act up. We were just like any people sharing an apartment." In 2021, Rampling acknowledged the relationship in an interview with The Guardian, saying:

Well, I did have two boyfriends, which was racy at the time...We were all very young. It was all chop and change. Quite a lot of things were experimental, I suppose. How to live a life! I don't know whether I've got it now, but never mind – I had it!

Rampling moved to Paris in the late 1970s. In 1978, Rampling married French composer Jean-Michel Jarre and had a second son, David Jarre, who became a musician and singer and then a magician. She also raised her stepdaughter, Émilie Jarre, who became a fashion designer. The marriage was publicly dissolved in 1997, when Rampling learned from tabloid stories about Jarre's affairs with other women. Their divorce was finalised in 2002. Rampling later remarked:

It is not uncommon for a man to have an affair, or even for a woman to have an affair. But the way I found out! In the tabloids. It was demeaning. And then for it to have continued. No, I could not forgive that at the time.

Rampling was engaged to Jean-Noël Tassez, a French journalist and businessman, from 1998 until his death in 2015.

== Selected filmography ==
- Rotten to the Core (1965)
- Georgy Girl (1966)
- The Long Duel (1967)
- Sardinia Kidnapped (1968)
- The Damned (1969)
- 'Tis Pity She's a Whore (1971)
- Vanishing Point (1971)
- Asylum (1972)
- The Night Porter (1974)
- Caravan to Vaccarès (1974)
- Zardoz (1974)
- La Chair de l'orchidée (1975)
- Farewell, My Lovely (1975)
- Sherlock Holmes in New York (1976)
- Foxtrot (1976)
- Orca (1977)
- Stardust Memories (1980)
- The Verdict (1982)
- Angel Heart (1987)
- D.O.A. (1988)
- Asphalt Tango (1996)
- The Cherry Orchard (1999)
- Under the Sand (2000)
- Swimming Pool (2003)
- Immortal (2004)
- The Keys to the House (2004)
- Lemming (2005)
- Heading South (2005)
- Basic Instinct 2 (2006)
- Dexter (2006)
- Babylon A.D. (2008)
- The Duchess (2008)
- The Eye of the Storm (2011)
- Melancholia (2011)
- The Mill and the Cross (2011)
- I, Anna (2012)
- Cleanskin (2012)
- Night Train to Lisbon (2013)
- Young & Beautiful (2013)
- 45 Years (2015)
- Broadchurch (2015)
- Assassin's Creed (2016)
- The Sense of an Ending (2017)
- Hannah (2017)
- Red Sparrow (2018)
- Benedetta (2021)
- Dune (2021)
- Juniper (2021)
- Dune: Part Two (2024)
- Father Mother Sister Brother (2025)
- Dune: Part Three (2026)

== Discography ==
=== Studio albums ===
Title	Album details
Comme une femme	Released: 2002; Label: Mohican Records; Formats: CD
De l'amour mais quelle drôle d'idée	Released: 2022; Label: 29 Music; Formats: CD, Vinyl

=== Audiobooks ===
Year	Title	Publisher
2002	À tes rêves! T'es toi quand tu peins	Les Portes du monde
