= 45 Years =

2015 film

- British release poster
- Directed by: Andrew Haigh
- Screenplay by: Andrew Haigh
- Based on: "In Another Country" by David Constantine
- Produced by: Tristan Goligher
- Starring: Charlotte Rampling; Tom Courtenay
- Cinematography: Lol Crawley
- Edited by: Jonathan Alberts
- Production companies: Film4; BFI; Creative England; The Bureau
- Distributed by: Artificial Eye
- Release dates: 6 February 2015 (Berlin); 28 August 2015 (UK)
- Running time: 95 minutes
- Country: United Kingdom
- Language: English
- Box office: $14.2 million

45 Years is a 2015 British romantic drama film written and directed by Andrew Haigh. It is based on the short story "In Another Country" by David Constantine.

45 Years premiered in the main competition section of the 65th Berlin International Film Festival, where Charlotte Rampling won the Silver Bear for Best Actress and Tom Courtenay for Best Actor. It was released in the United Kingdom on 28 August 2015 and went on to gross $14.2 million worldwide. At the 88th Academy Awards, Rampling received a nomination for Best Actress in a Leading Role.

== Plot summary ==
Five years after retirees Kate and Geoff Mercer had to cancel their 40th wedding anniversary because of Geoff's heart bypass surgery, the comfortably-off, childless Norfolk couple are preparing to celebrate their 45th anniversary with dozens of friends at the Assembly House in Norwich. Their morning is somewhat disturbed when Geoff opens a letter telling him that the body of Katya, his German lover in the early 1960s before meeting Kate, has become visible in a melting glacier where she fell into a crevasse on their hike in Switzerland over five decades before.

Kate has been told about Katya previously by Geoff and seems initially unconcerned by his controlled disquiet. Geoff tells Kate that he and Katya had pretended to be married in order to be able to share a room in the more puritanical early 1960s. Because of this, the Swiss authorities consider him to be Katya's next of kin.

As the days pass and preparations for the party continue, Geoff continues to be moody and starts smoking again. One night, Geoff climbs into the attic to look at his memorabilia of Katya and only reluctantly shows a picture of her to an angrily insistent Kate. Kate notices that Katya looks like her when she was young, with similar dark hair.

While Geoff is out at a reunion luncheon at his former workplace, Kate climbs the ladder to the attic. She finds Geoff's scrapbook filled with memorabilia from his time with Katya, including pressed violets from their last hike. She finds a carousel slide projector, loaded with images of Switzerland and Katya, next to a makeshift screen to view them. Kate is shocked to see slides showing that Katya was pregnant at the time of her death.

Kate also takes up smoking again and, upon learning of his visit to the local travel agency to inquire about trips to Switzerland, confronts Geoff about his recent behavior. Though she does not reveal what she saw in the attic, she does say that she now feels as though many of their decisions as a couple were, without her awareness, influenced by Geoff's experiences with Katya. Geoff promises their marriage will "start again", which he marks the next morning by serving Kate tea in bed and making her breakfast. They attend their anniversary party in the historic Grand Hall, and Geoff delivers a tearful speech in which he professes his love for Kate.

The first dance is announced, accompanied by the same first song from Kate and Geoff's wedding, "Smoke Gets in Your Eyes" by The Platters. While they slow dance, Geoff becomes silly and playful, but Kate becomes increasingly awkward and rigid. As the song ends and Geoff raises their hands together in the air to cheers from the guests, Kate yanks her arm down. Geoff, apparently oblivious, dances away, leaving Kate standing alone amid the mass of people on the dance floor.

== Cast ==
- Charlotte Rampling as Kate Mercer
- Tom Courtenay as Geoff Mercer
- Geraldine James as Lena
- Dolly Wells as Sally
- David Sibley as George
- Sam Alexander as Chris the Postman
- Richard Cunningham as Mr. Watkins
- Hannah Chalmers as Travel Agent

== Production ==
Filming took place over 6 weeks, concluding in May 2014.

== Reception ==
=== Critical response ===
On the review aggregator website Rotten Tomatoes, 97% of 212 critics' reviews of the film are positive, with an average rating of 8.6/10; the site's "critics consensus" reads: "45 Years offers richly thought-provoking rewards for fans of adult cinema – and a mesmerizing acting showcase for leads Charlotte Rampling and Tom Courtenay." On Metacritic, the film has a weighted average score of 94 out of 100 based on reviews from 36 critics, indicating "universal acclaim".

In a review in The Observer, Mark Kermode described the film as a "subtle examination of the persistence of the past and the fragile (in)stability of the present", arguing that the lead performances "turn an apparently everyday story of a marriage in quiet crisis into something rather extraordinary." He concluded by observing that, "Like the final shot of The Long Good Friday, which lingers upon Bob Hoskins's face as he revisits the events that brought him to this sorry pass, 45 Years shows us the past materialising in the expressions of those trapped in the present, staring into an uncertain future."

=== Accolades ===
| Award / Film Festival | Category | Recipients and nominees | Result |
|---|---|---|---|
| Academy Awards | Best Actress | Charlotte Rampling | Nominated |
| Berlin International Film Festival | Best Actor | Tom Courtenay | Won |
| Berlin International Film Festival | Best Actress | Charlotte Rampling | Won |
| Berlin International Film Festival | Golden Bear | Andrew Haigh | Nominated |
| British Academy Film Awards | Outstanding British Film | Andrew Haigh, Tristan Goligher | Nominated |
| British Independent Film Awards | Best British Independent Film | 45 Years | Nominated |
| British Independent Film Awards | Best Director | Andrew Haigh | Nominated |
| British Independent Film Awards | Best Actress | Charlotte Rampling | Nominated |
| British Independent Film Awards | Best Actor | Tom Courtenay | Nominated |
| British Independent Film Awards | Best Screenplay | Andrew Haigh | Nominated |
| British Independent Film Awards | Producer of the Year | Tristan Goligher | Nominated |
| Boston Society of Film Critics | Best Actress | Charlotte Rampling | Won |
| Chicago Film Critics Association | Best Actress | Charlotte Rampling | Nominated |
| Critics' Choice Awards | Best Actress | Charlotte Rampling | Nominated |
| Dallas–Fort Worth Film Critics Association | Best Actress | Charlotte Rampling | 4th Place |
| David di Donatello | Best European Film | 45 Years | Nominated |
| Dorian Awards | Performance Of The Year — Actress | Charlotte Rampling | Nominated |
| Dublin Film Critics' Circle | Best Actor | Tom Courtenay | 4th Place |
| Edinburgh International Film Festival | Best Performance in a British Feature Film | Charlotte Rampling | Won |
| Edinburgh International Film Festival | Michael Powell Award for Best British Feature Film | Andrew Haigh | Won |
| Empire Awards | Best British Film | 45 Years | Nominated |
| European Film Awards | Best European Actor | Tom Courtenay | Nominated |
| European Film Awards | Best European Actress | Charlotte Rampling | Won |
| European Film Awards | Best European Screenwriter | Andrew Haigh | Nominated |
| Evening Standard British Film Awards | Best Film | 45 Years | Nominated |
| Evening Standard British Film Awards | Best Actor | Tom Courtenay | Nominated |
| Evening Standard British Film Awards | Best Actress | Charlotte Rampling | Nominated |
| Evening Standard British Film Awards | Editor's Award | 45 Years | Won |
| Florida Film Critics Circle | Best Actress | Charlotte Rampling | Runner-up |
| Indiewire Critics Poll | Best Lead Actress | Charlotte Rampling | Won |
| Indiewire Critics Poll | Best Lead Actor | Tom Courtenay | 5th Place |
| Irish Film & Television Awards | Best International Actress | Charlotte Rampling | Nominated |
| London Film Critics' Circle | Film of the Year | 45 Years | Nominated |
| London Film Critics' Circle | British / Irish Film of the Year | 45 Years | Won |
| London Film Critics' Circle | Director of the Year | Andrew Haigh | Nominated |
| London Film Critics' Circle | Actress of the Year | Charlotte Rampling | Won |
| London Film Critics' Circle | Actor of the Year | Tom Courtenay | Won |
| London Film Critics' Circle | British / Irish Actress of the Year | Charlotte Rampling | Nominated |
| Los Angeles Film Critics Association | Best Actress | Charlotte Rampling | Won |
| National Board of Review | Top Ten Independent Films | 45 Years | Won |
| National Society of Film Critics | Best Actress | Charlotte Rampling | Won |
| New York Film Critics Online | Top 10 Films | 45 Years | Won |
| Online Film Critics Society | Best Actress | Charlotte Rampling | Nominated |
| San Diego Film Critics Society | Best Actress | Charlotte Rampling | Nominated |
| San Francisco Film Critics Circle | Best Actress | Charlotte Rampling | Nominated |
| San Francisco Film Critics Circle | Best Adapted Screenplay | Andrew Haigh | Nominated |
| Valladolid Film Festival | Best Actress | Charlotte Rampling | Won |
