= I, Anna =

- Theatrical release poster
- Directed by: Barnaby Southcombe
- Screenplay by: Barnaby Southcombe
- Based on: I, Anna by Elsa Lewin
- Produced by: Michael Eckelt; Ilann Girard; Christopher Simon; Felix Vossen
- Starring: Charlotte Rampling; Gabriel Byrne
- Cinematography: Ben Smithard
- Edited by: Peter Boyle
- Music by: Jean Michel Derain and David Braud as KID stands for keep it dark
- Production company: Embargo Films
- Distributed by: Artificial Eye
- Release dates: 12 February 2012 (Berlin); 7 December 2012 (United Kingdom)
- Running time: 91 minutes
- Countries: United Kingdom; Germany; France
- Language: English

I, Anna is a 2012 noir thriller film written and directed by Barnaby Southcombe and based on Elsa Lewin's novel of the same name. The film stars Southcombe's mother Charlotte Rampling alongside Gabriel Byrne and Hayley Atwell.

== Plot ==
DCI Bernie Reid's latest case is the mystery of a man brutally murdered in a London apartment building. As an insomniac going through a divorce, Reid's concentration on the case is further complicated after an encounter with Anna, an enigmatic figure. He tracks her down to a party where she denies any knowledge of having already met him. Despite her protestations, there is a mutual attraction between them. Bernie's professional ethics come into question as he grows more attached to Anna, who is about to unveil a dark mystery.

== Cast ==
- Charlotte Rampling as Anna Welles
- Gabriel Byrne as D.C.I. Bernie Reid
- Eddie Marsan as D.I. Kevin Franks
- Jodhi May as Janet Stone
- Ralph Brown as George Stone
- Max Deacon as Stevie
- Honor Blackman as Joan
- Hayley Atwell as Emmy
- Caroline Catz as Louise
- Bryan Dick as D.C. Peter Hicock
- Bill Milner as Theo

== Production ==
The film shot for 5 weeks in London, and 1 week in a Hamburg studio. Filming wrapped in March 2011.

== Reception ==
On the review aggregator website Rotten Tomatoes, 61% of 28 critics' reviews are positive, with an average rating of 5.7/10.
