= Restless (TV series) =

2012 British TV adaptation of the novel "Restless" by William Boyd

- Genre: Drama
- Written by: William Boyd
- Directed by: Edward Hall
- Starring: Hayley Atwell; Rufus Sewell; Michelle Dockery; Michael Gambon; Charlotte Rampling; James Norton
- Composer: Lorne Balfe
- Country of origin: United Kingdom
- Original language: English
- No. of seasons: 1
- No. of episodes: 2

Production
- Producers: Hilary Bevan Jones; Paul Frift
- Running time: 90 minutes
- Production company: Endor Productions

Original release
- Network: BBC One
- Release: 27 December – 28 December 2012

Restless is a 2012 British TV adaptation of William Boyd's espionage novel Restless (2006). Directed by Edward Hall, the film features Hayley Atwell, Rufus Sewell, Michelle Dockery, Michael Gambon and Charlotte Rampling. The two parts first aired on 27 and 28 December 2012 on BBC One.

== Plot ==
The film, like the novel, has two narrative lines, alternating between the 1970s and the 1940s. In the 1970s, Sally Gilmartin senses her quiet life in the country to be menaced since her photo appeared in the newspapers upon the recent death of her husband. Gilmartin believes the threat is a result of her secret life thirty years previously and maneuvers her adult daughter into helping her find a resolution. The 1940s scenes cover Gilmartin’s backstory, during the early years of the Second World War when she worked as a British intelligence agent in Europe and America.

=== Part One ===
The story opens in the 1970s with Ruth Gilmartin, a PhD student in history or politics at St John's College, Cambridge, driving with her young son to visit her mother in her secluded country cottage. When she arrives, her mother, Sally Gilmartin, is nervous and believes that men are watching her from the nearby woods. Ruth mocks her mother's fears. Sally then hands her a file labelled "Eva Delectorskaya," and informs her daughter that Eva Delectorskaya is Sally's real name. The 1940s scenes transition into the film from Ruth's reading her mother's account of her secret life during those years.

The wartime narrative begins in Paris in the summer of 1939. Eva, her brother Kolia, and their father are Russian exiles from the Bolshevik Revolution living in France. After taking notes at a right-wing political meeting, Kolia is beaten to death in the street by several men. Following the funeral, Eva is approached by a man whom she had earlier seen talking to her brother. He introduces himself as Lucas Romer, a friend of Kolia, and offers the family any needed help.

Eva coldly declines Romer’s offer, but returns home to find him there speaking with her father. Lucas tells her that he works for the British security services, and that Kolia worked for him and wanted Eva to also become a spy. War, he says, is imminent. Eva is initially reluctant but agrees after Lucas says that her father can obtain citizenship and free medical treatment in Britain. She goes to Scotland for training, where she proves herself extremely capable at memory tests, tradecraft, and a survival exercises.

By the time Eva’s training ends, war in Europe has broken out. She is assigned to Lucas’ team in neutral Belgium, which fabricates fake news stories to be picked up by the Germans and influence their war effort. Lucas selects her to accompany him to observe an operation in the (fictitious) Dutch border town of Preslo, but things go wrong and two SIS officers are captured by the German Sicherheitsdienst (SD-Security Service). Back in London the following September, Eva’s testimony is key in clearing Lucas of any responsibility for the fiasco, and his team is selected to work in the still-neutral United States. On the eve of the reassignment, Eva and Lucas become lovers. They continue their affair in America, where Romer’s team is part of British activities to collect intelligence and provide information and misinformation to encourage the U.S. government and public to support the British war effort and ultimately enter the conflict.

Part 1 concludes with an intercutting of the two story lines, with Eva and Ruth each embarking on an emotionally challenging field operation.

=== Part Two ===
Despite their intimate relationship, Lucas orders Eva to seduce the married Mason Harding, who has access to reliable information from the Oval Office on the evolving American position towards intervention in the European war. Following its success, he sends her to New Mexico on a working vacation: a routine courier job, to pick up a package and deliver it to another party. The package turns out to be a map of projected German airline routes from a Nazi-administered Mexico. Eva is suspicious of its authenticity and informs her colleagues in New York, but chooses to complete the task.

The routine assignment goes awry, Eva survives an attempt to kill her, and the map ultimately makes its way to the FBI and convinces the American government of German designs on Mexico. However, as agents in Romer's group die one by one, Eva concludes that they have been betrayed and flees to Canada, learning upon arrival of the attack on Pearl Harbor. Returning to London some months later, Eva meets up with Alfie, the last remaining member of her group, and determines that Romer betrayed her and the team. Eva and Romer cross paths during a bombing raid and each attempts to kill the other, but he gets away and she disappears, never to see each other during the ensuing years.

In the alternating scenes set over the course of several weeks in the 1970s, Eva maneuvers a reluctant Ruth to use her academic skills and contacts to discover Lucas’ current assumed identity and his home address. The two women confront him, and Romer is revealed as a double-agent. Romer commits suicide, but afterwards Eva remains apprehensive in her country home.

== Historical context ==
The adaptation paid close attention to period detail and historical setting, introducing viewers to lesser-known aspects of the war before Pearl Harbor, particularly British intelligence and propaganda activities in the United States. Eva is introduced in the context of Russian exiles and of political streetfighting in prewar France. The operation in Preslo is a thinly-veiled version of the Venlo Incident of November 1939. Romer's team in New York is based on the British Security Co-Ordination, whose country-wide operations were headquartered in Rockefeller Center. BSC never operated its own news service like Transoceanic Press, but it secretly provided subsidies, staffers, and stories to other media companies. The fate of Morris Devereux's Russian contact, Nekich, mirrors that of Soviet defector Walter Krivitsky, found dead in a Washington, D.C. hotel in early 1941. The New Mexico episode is inspired by an October 1941 incident, in which a map showing a South America divided into Gaus and detailed Lufthansa routes was purportedly stolen from a German courier in Buenos Aires. Romer's treason resembles that of several British intelligence officers who won honors during the war, only to be later unmasked as double agents.

Oddly, a misplaced detail jumbles the chronology of the film's American narrative. The service inquiry on Preslo takes place in London in September 1940, but in a sequence showing Romer's team fully installed and operational in New York, Eva passes to her regular contact a fresh copy of the New York Times dated August 21, 1940. (The front page is a facsimile of the original.) Moreover, the British-fabricated story that Eva slips into the newspaper is a follow-up to the October 1941 encounter between the destroyer USS Kearny and a German U-Boat, and the remainder of the U.S. scenes are paced to fit an October-December 1941 timeframe. (In Boyd's novel, the chapters set in the U.S. are headed "1941".)

== Cast ==
- Hayley Atwell as Sally Gilmartin aka Eva Delectorskaya (younger)
- Kevin Guthrie as Alfie Blytheswood
- Rufus Sewell as Lucas Romer
- Michelle Dockery as Ruth Gilmartin
- Charlotte Rampling as Sally Gilmartin aka Eva Delectorskaya (older)
- Gwilym Lee as Sean Gilmartin
- Michael Gambon as Lord Mansfield
- Michael Peter Willis as Jochen
- Tom Brooke as Angus Woolf
- Adrian Scarborough as Morris Devereux
- Bertie Carvel as Mason Harding
- David Butler as Keegan-Vale
- Julian Firth as Servant
- Catherine Harvey as Mrs. Dangerfield
- James Norton as Kolia
- Thekla Reuten as Sylvia Rhys Meyers
- Rob Ostlere as a shop assistant

== Production ==
The drama was produced by Endor Productions in association with Sundance Channel. It was directed by Edward Hall, and produced by Hilary Bevan Jones and Paul Frift.

The exterior of the club, "Brydges", frequented by Lord Romer, was filmed at Bearwood House, Sindlesham in Berkshire.

== Reception ==
Adrian Michaels, writing for The Daily Telegraph, praised the first part of the adaptation as "terrific", saying: "There was enough plot development to keep everything ticking along, but at an easy pace that was a welcome change from Scandinavian psychopaths starting a bloodbath every 15 minutes." The first part was also received well by John Crace in The Guardian; he commented on the high production values and compared it to another series featuring Dockery, saying it "was everything [Downton Abbey] isn't: well-acted, well-written, well-paced and well-filmed".
