= Jameson People's Choice Award for Best Actress =

Former European film award

The People's Choice Award for Best Actress was one of the categories for the European Film Awards presented annually by the European Film Academy. It was first awarded in 1997, when the winner was Jodie Foster, and ceased after 2005. The winners were chosen each year by the general public. Kate Winslet won the award twice.

== Winners ==
- 1997 – Jodie Foster (Contact)
- 1998 – Kate Winslet (Titanic)
- 1999 – Catherine Zeta-Jones (Entrapment)
- 2000 – Björk (Dancer in the Dark)
- 2001 – Juliette Binoche (Chocolat)
- 2002 – Kate Winslet (Iris)
- 2003 – Katrin Sass (Good Bye Lenin!)
- 2004 – Penélope Cruz (Don't Move)
- 2005 – Julia Jentsch (Sophie Scholl - The Final Days)
