= Under the Sand =

Sous le sable
- Theatrical release poster
- Directed by: François Ozon
- Written by: François Ozon; Emmanuèle Bernheim
- Produced by: Olivier Delbosc; Marc Missonnier
- Starring: Charlotte Rampling; Bruno Cremer
- Cinematography: Antoine Héberlé; Jeanne Lapoirie
- Edited by: Laurence Bawedin
- Music by: Philippe Rombi
- Distributed by: Haut et Court
- Release dates: 11 September 2000 (TIFF); 7 February 2001 (France)
- Running time: 96 minutes
- Country: France
- Language: French
- Box office: $6,531,687

Under the Sand (French: Sous le sable, pronounced [su lə sɑbl]) is a 2000 French drama film directed and written by François Ozon. The film was nominated for three César Awards and was critically well received. It stars Charlotte Rampling and Bruno Cremer.

== Plot ==
Marie is an English professor at a Parisian university. She has been happily married to Jean for 25 years. They vacation in the Landes, where his family has a house. At the beach, he goes for a swim while she sunbathes and later falls asleep. He never returns. There are no witnesses to any accident, and his body cannot be found; he may have committed suicide, he may have drowned in an accident. Marie does not accept his death, and she keeps seeing him (perhaps an apparition) after her return to Paris.

Marie begins an affair, even while she denies her husband's death, though she receives a call from the Landes police, saying a body had been found in a fisherman's net. Her friends are worried about her mental health, and when her lover offers her his help, she says he can't measure up to Jean, and rejects him. When visiting Jean's mother, who lives in a nursing home, she tells her that Jean may have killed himself; her mother in law rejects that, and says he probably left her because he was bored with her, and because, she says, she could not give him children. Finally, she goes to Landes to meet with the local officials. She is told he probably drowned while struggling with the undertow. The body, however, has spent so much time under water that it is putrefied and cannot be easily identified; a genetic test shows 90% correspondence with his mother, and the dental records seem to match as well. The lack of any past occurrence of fractures stop them from matching through skeletal analysis. She insists on seeing the body and reacts with horror. A wristwatch has also been found: she denies that it is his, though it matches exactly her earlier description of it to the police. She later returns to the beach where he disappeared, sees (or imagines) a male figure in the distance and runs toward what she believes to be Jean.

== Cast ==
- Charlotte Rampling as Marie Drillon
- Bruno Cremer as Jean Drillon
- Jacques Nolot as Vincent
- Alexandra Stewart as Amanda
- Pierre Vernier as Gérard
- Andrée Tainsy as Suzanne
- Michel Cordes as Superintendent

== Production ==
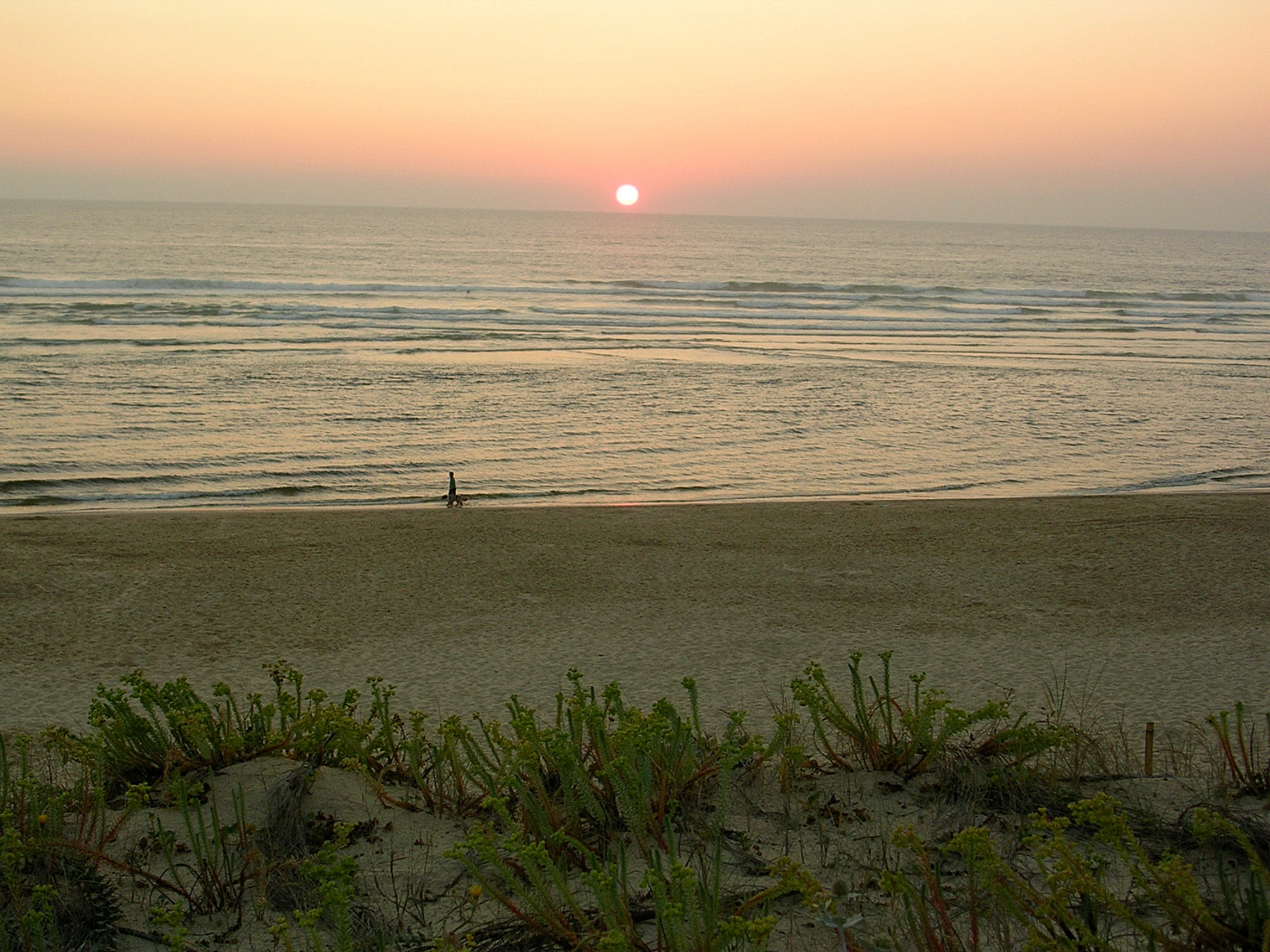
The dramatic scenery at Mimizan

The film was shot in Paris and in the Landes department including Lit-et-Mixe, Mimizan-Plage beach and at Saint-Julien-en-Born. Principal photography began from 15 March 2000 to 15 April 2000.

== Reception ==
On the review aggregator website Rotten Tomatoes, 93% of 73 critics' reviews are positive, with an average rating of 7.5/10. The website's consensus reads: "Rampling carries the film with her finely nuanced performance of a woman coping with her husband's death." Metacritic, which uses a weighted average, assigned the film a score of 86 out of 100, based on 24 critics, indicating "universal acclaim".

The Swedish filmmaker Ingmar Bergman admired Sous le sable, claimed that he watched the film several times.

The film was listed as The New York Times's Critic's Pick by A. O. Scott, who said that "Ozon gives the movie to Ms. Rampling, whose performance is like a perfectly executed piano étude".

Variety's Derek Elley called the film "An exquisite reflection on personal bereavement", and called Charlotte Rampling's performance as "career-best". He then went on saying that "Under the Sand reps a hard commercial sell but could unearth solid niche business with critical support and devoted distrib[ution]s".

Marjorie Baumgarten of The Austin Chronicle called film's director "a rare talent", while Lisa Schwarzbaum of Entertainment Weekly awarded the film with a "B+" score and called Rampling a "magnificent, coolly alluring fifty-something siren".

According to Ed Gonzalez of Slant Magazine, "[Under the Sand] is fraught with all sorts of erotic displacements and rituals of denial".

=== Awards ===
Sous le sable was nominated for Best Film at the César Awards 2002. It also earned Best Director and Best Actress César nominations for Ozon and Rampling.
