= List of Cannes Film Festival records =

List of Cannes Film Festival records. This list is as current as of the 79th Cannes Film Festival held in May 2026.

== Longest standing ovations ==
With 22 minutes, Pan's Labyrinth (2006) holds the record for longest standing ovation.

Length	Title	Ref(s)
22 minutes	Pan's Labyrinth (2006)	
20 minutes	Fahrenheit 9/11 (2004) La bola negra (2026)	
19 minutes	Sentimental Value (2025)	
18 minutes	Mud (2012)	
17 minutes	The Neon Demon (2016)	
15 minutes	Once Upon a Time in America (1984) The Paperboy (2012) (Note: Some critics questioned the definition of "standing ovation," as some audience members were booing and jeering during the ovation.) Two Days, One Night (2014) Capernaum (2018) Happy as Lazzaro (2018)	
14 minutes	Belle (2021) The Seed of the Sacred Fig (2024)	
13 minutes	Bowling for Columbine (2002) Mommy (2014) The Secret Agent (2025)	
12 minutes	The Artist (2011) Elvis (2022) Alpha (2025) The Little Sister (2025) Her Private Hell (2026) Fjord (2026)	
11 minutes	Inglourious Basterds (2009) The Substance (2024) The Count of Monte Cristo (2024) The Apprentice (2024) The Plague (2025) Romería (2025) A Man of His Time (2026)	
10 minutes	The Beaver (2011) Rust and Bone (2012) Carol (2015) Macbeth (2015) Captain Fantastic (2016) BlacKkKlansman (2018) Arctic (2018) Close (2022) Nouvelle Vague (2025) It Was Just an Accident (2025) A Private Life (2025) Woman and Child (2025)	
9 minutes	All Is Lost (2013) Ice and the Sky (2015) The French Dispatch (2021) Killers of the Flower Moon (2023) La chimera (2023) Emilia Pérez (2024) Horizon: An American Saga – Chapter 1 (2024) Parthenope (2024) The History of Sound (2025) Homebound (2025) Teenage Sex and Death at Camp Miasma (2026)	
8 minutes	Clerks II (2006) It's Only the End of the World (2016) La Belle Époque (2019) Matthias & Maxime (2019) Tori and Lokita (2022) Triangle of Sadness (2022) May December (2023) The Surfer (2024) All We Imagine as Light (2024) Case 137 (2025)	
7 minutes	The Tree (2010) You Were Never Really Here (2017) Once Upon a Time in Hollywood (2019) BAC Nord (2021) Broker (2022) Holy Spider (2022) Hunt (2022) Jeanne du Barry (2023) Kennedy (2023) Bird (2024) Megalopolis (2024) The Apprentice (2024) Anora (2024) Motel Destino (2024) Bono: Stories of Surrender (2025) Pillion (2025) The Phoenician Scheme (2025) Fuori (2025) Resurrection (2025) Club Kid (2026) All of a Sudden (2026) Tangles (2026) Roma Elastica (2026)	
6 minutes	Good Time (2017) Bacurau (2019) Furiosa: A Mad Max Saga (2024) Kinds of Kindness (2024) Highest 2 Lowest (2025) Karma (2026)	
5 minutes	Moulin Rouge! (2001) Inside Llewyn Davis (2013) Twin Peaks season 3 (2017) Annette (2021) Top Gun: Maverick (2022) Anatomy of a Fall (2023) Indiana Jones and the Dial of Destiny (2023) The Idol (2023) Eddington (2025)	
4 minutes	Okja (2017) Showing Up (2022) Rumours (2024)	

== Longest screening runtime ==
- The War (2007) – 870 minutes, split into four Special Screenings from 22 to 23 May 2007.

== Longest gap between first time in Official Selection and first Palme d'Or ==
42 years – Jean-Luc Godard's first film in Official Selection was How's it going, screened in the section Perspectives du Cinéma Français in 1976. He won his first and only Palme d'Or for The Image Book in 2018, which also marked the first time in the history of the festival that a director was awarded with a Palme d'Or Spéciale.

== Directing records ==
=== Directors with multiple Palme d'Or wins ===
11 directors or co-directors have won the Palme d'Or twice. Three of these (^{‡}) have won for consecutive films.

Wins	Director(s)	Palme d'Or winners	Ref(s)
2	Alf Sjöberg	Torment (1946) and Miss Julie (1951)	
2	Francis Ford Coppola	The Conversation (1974) and Apocalypse Now (1979)	
2	Bille August ‡	Pelle the Conqueror (1988) and The Best Intentions (1992)	
2	Emir Kusturica	When Father Was Away on Business (1985) and Underground (1995)	
2	Shohei Imamura	The Ballad of Narayama (1983) and The Eel (1997)	
2	Dardenne brothers	Rosetta (1999) and The Child (2005)	
2	Michael Haneke ‡	The White Ribbon (2009) and Amour (2012)	
2	Ken Loach	The Wind That Shakes The Barley (2006) and I, Daniel Blake (2016)	
2	Ruben Östlund ‡	The Square (2017) and Triangle of Sadness (2022)	
2	Cristian Mungiu	4 Months, 3 Weeks and 2 Days (2007) and Fjord (2026)	

=== Directors with multiple Grand Prix wins ===
Four directors have won the Grand Prix twice.

Wins	Director	Grand Prix winners	Ref(s)
2	Andrei Tarkovsky	Solaris (1972) and The Sacrifice (1986)	
2	Bruno Dumont	Humanité (1999) and Flanders (2006)	
2	Nuri Bilge Ceylan	Uzak (2003) and Once Upon a Time in Anatolia (2011)	
2	Matteo Garrone	Gomorrah (2008) and Reality (2012)	

=== Directors with multiple Best Director wins ===
Five directors have won two or more Best Director awards:

Wins	Director	Films	Ref(s)
3	Joel Coen	Barton Fink (1991), Fargo (1996) and The Man Who Wasn't There (2001)	
2	René Clément	The Battle of the Rails (1946) and The Walls of Malapaga (1949)	
2	Sergei Yutkevich	Othello (1956) and Lenin in Poland (1966)	
2	Robert Bresson	A Man Escaped (1957) and L'Argent (1983)	
2	John Boorman	Leo the Last (1970) and The General (1998)	
2	Paweł Pawlikowski	Cold War (2018) and Fatherland (2026)	

=== Directors with most films in main competition ===
With fifteen films, Ken Loach holds the record for most films in main competition at Cannes.

15 films:

- Ken Loach

10 films:

- Jean-Pierre & Luc Dardenne
- Wim Wenders

9 films:

- Carlos Saura
- Lars von Trier
- Nanni Moretti

8 films:

- Ethan & Joel Coen
- Ettore Scola
- Hirokazu Kore-eda
- Jean-Luc Godard
- Jim Jarmusch
- Marco Bellocchio
- Marco Ferreri
- Robert Altman

7 films:

- Arnaud Desplechin
- David Cronenberg
- Hou Hsiao-hsien
- Luis Buñuel
- Michael Cacoyannis
- Michael Haneke
- Miklós Jancsó
- Nuri Bilge Ceylan
- Paolo Sorrentino
- Pedro Almodóvar
- Pietro Germi

6 films:

- Alain Resnais
- André Téchiné
- Andrzej Wajda
- Atom Egoyan
- Jacques Audiard
- James Gray
- James Ivory
- Jerzy Skolimowski
- Jia Zhangke
- Károly Makk
- Michelangelo Antonioni
- René Clément
- Vittorio De Sica

5 films:

- Abbas Kiarostami
- Aki Kaurismäki
- Alan Parker
- Alexander Sokurov
- Alf Sjöberg
- Asghar Farhadi
- Bo Widerberg
- Chen Kaige
- Clint Eastwood
- Cristian Mungiu
- Emir Kusturica
- Ingmar Bergman
- Manoel de Oliveira
- Mario Monicelli
- Mauro Bolognini
- Mike Leigh
- Naomi Kawase (Note: Kawase had a 6th film, True Mothers (2020), chosen for the ceremonial "Official Selection" in 2020 when the festival was cancelled due to the COVID-19 pandemic and there was no competition.)
- Olivier Assayas
- Shōhei Imamura
- Theo Angelopoulos

4 films:

- Alberto Lattuada
- Aleksandar Petrović
- Amos Gitai
- André Cayatte
- Andrea Arnold
- Andrei Konchalovsky
- Andrey Zvyagintsev
- Arne Skouen
- Bertrand Blier
- Bertrand Tavernier
- Bruce Beresford
- Bruno Dumont
- David Lynch
- Delbert Mann
- Dino Risi
- Elia Kazan
- Francesco Rosi
- Francis Ford Coppola
- François Ozon
- Gus Van Sant
- Hal Ashby
- Hong Sang-soo
- István Szabó
- Jacques Becker
- Jerry Schatzberg
- John Boorman
- Joseph Losey
- Jules Dassin
- Kirill Serebrennikov
- Ladislao Vajda
- Leopoldo Torre Nilsson
- Lindsay Anderson
- Louis Malle
- Luis García Berlanga
- Martin Scorsese
- Márton Keleti
- Matteo Garrone
- Maurice Pialat
- Michel Hazanavicius
- Mohammed Lakhdar-Hamina
- Nagisa Ōshima
- Park Chan-wook
- Peter Greenaway
- Quentin Tarantino
- Raúl Ruiz
- Robert Bresson
- Roberto Gavaldón
- Satyajit Ray
- Sergei Loznitsa
- Sergei Yutkevich
- Sidney Lumet
- Steven Soderbergh
- Todd Haynes
- Vojtěch Jasný
- Volker Schlöndorff
- Werner Herzog
- Wes Anderson
- Wong Kar-wai
- Youssef Chahine

=== Female directors who have won the Palme d'Or ===
Three female directors have won the Palme d'Or.

- Jane Campion for The Piano in 1993.
- Julia Ducournau for Titane in 2021.
- Justine Triet for Anatomy of a Fall in 2023.

=== Female directors in main competition in the same year ===
In 2023, seven female directors had films competing for the Palme d'Or, a record that was matched in 2025. The 2012 festival was the last edition to feature no female directors in the Official Competition, while the 2013 festival was the last to feature only one woman competing for the Palme d'Or.

Year	Number of Female directors	Ref(s)
2023, 2025	7	
2022, 2026	5	
2011, 2019, 2021, 2024	4	
1974, 1981, 1989, 1993, 2004, 2006, 2007, 2009, 2016, 2017, 2018	3	
1946, 1954, 1962, 1979, 1984, 1988, 2000, 2001, 2003, 2008, 2014, 2015	2	

== Acting records ==
=== Actors with multiple Best Actor wins ===
Three actors have won the Best Actor award twice:

Wins	Actor	Films	Ref(s)
2	Dean Stockwell	Compulsion (1959) and Long Day's Journey into Night (1962)	
2	Jack Lemmon	The China Syndrome (1979) and Missing (1982)	
2	Marcello Mastroianni	The Pizza Triangle (1970) and Dark Eyes (1987)	

=== Actresses with multiple Best Actress wins ===
Four actresses have won the Best Actress award twice:

Wins	Actress	Films	Ref(s)
2	Vanessa Redgrave	Morgan – A Suitable Case for Treatment (1966) and Isadora (1969)	
2	Barbara Hershey	Shy People (1987) and A World Apart (1988)	
2	Helen Mirren	Cal (1984) and The Madness of King George (1995)	
2	Isabelle Huppert	Violette Nozière (1978) and The Piano Teacher (2001)	

=== Actors who have appeared in multiple Palme d'Or winners ===
Eighteen actors have appeared in multiple Palme d'Or winners. Max von Sydow, Robert Duvall and Harvey Keitel are tied with three films each.

Actor	Number	Palme d'Or winners	Ref(s)
Max von Sydow	3	Miss Julie (1951), Pelle the Conqueror (1987), The Best Intentions (1992)	
Robert Duvall	3	M*A*S*H (1970), The Conversation (1974), Apocalypse Now (1979)	
Harvey Keitel	3	Taxi Driver (1976), The Piano (1993), Pulp Fiction (1994)	
Orson Welles	2	The Third Man (1949), Othello (1951)	
Anouk Aimée	2	La Dolce Vita (1960), A Man and a Woman (1966)	
Gene Hackman	2	Scarecrow (1973), The Conversation (1974)	
Frederic Forrest	2	The Conversation (1974), Apocalypse Now (1979)	
Robert De Niro	2	Taxi Driver (1976), The Mission (1986)	
Harry Dean Stanton	2	Paris, Texas (1984), Wild at Heart (1990)	
Steve Buscemi	2	Barton Fink (1991), Pulp Fiction (1994)	
Davor Dujmović	2	When Father Was Away on Business (1985), Underground (1995)	
Miki Manojlović	2	When Father Was Away on Business (1985), Underground (1995)	
Catherine Deneuve	2	The Umbrellas of Cherbourg (1964), Dancer in the Dark (2000)	
Nanni Moretti	2	Padre Padrone (1977), The Son's Room (2001)	
Olivier Gourmet	2	Rosetta (1999), L'Enfant (2005)	
Fabrizio Rongione	2	Rosetta (1999), L'Enfant (2005)	
Jean-Louis Trintignant	2	A Man and a Woman (1966), Amour (2012)	
Gian Maria Volonté	2	The Working Class Goes to Heaven (1972) and The Mattei Affair (1972) (ex-aequo)	

=== Actors who have appeared in multiple award-winning films in the same year ===
- Francisco Rabal starred in both Viridiana (Palme d'Or) and The Hand in the Trap (F.I.P.R.E.S.C.I Award) in 1961.
- Gian Maria Volonté starred in both The Working Class Goes to Heaven and The Mattei Affair, which shared the Palme d'Or (then-named Grand Prix International du Festival) in 1972.
- Isabelle Adjani won the Best Actress award for both Quartet and Possession in 1981.
- Sandra Hüller played a leading role in both Anatomy of a Fall (Palme d'Or), and The Zone of Interest (Grand Prix) in 2023.

=== Actors who have appeared in most films in main competition ===
Isabelle Huppert holds the record as the actor or actress with the most films in main competition, with a total of 23. Marcello Mastroianni is the male actor with the most films in main competition, with a total of 19.

Actor	Number of films	Ref(s)
Isabelle Huppert	23	
Marcello Mastroianni	19	
Gérard Depardieu	14	
Jean-Louis Trintignant	14	
Catherine Deneuve	14	
Michel Piccoli	13	
Mathieu Amalric	12	
Nanni Moretti	12	
Francisco Rabal	11	
Gian Maria Volonté	11	
Mari Törőcsik (Note: Mari Törőcsik also acted in Trotta.)	11	
Tilda Swinton	11	
Léa Seydoux	11	
Stefania Sandrelli	10	
Annie Girardot	9	
Louis Garrel	9	
Marion Cotillard (Note: As of 2026, the official website of the Cannes Film Festival only lists 8 films in main competition for Marion Cotillard, but she was also in the cast of My Sex Life... or How I Got into an Argument, which was in the main competition in 1996. This film is missing from her filmography on the official Cannes' website.)	9	
Ugo Tognazzi	9	
Chiara Mastroianni	9	
Charlotte Rampling	8	
Chloë Sevigny (Note: Chloë Sevigny appeared in 8 films that were shown in main competition: Kids, Demonlover, Dogville, The Brown Bunny, Manderlay, Broken Flowers, Zodiac and The Dead Don't Die. The official website of the festival lists only 5 films in which she acted.)	8	
Emmanuelle Devos	8	
Geraldine Chaplin	8	
Greta Scacchi	8	
John Turturro	8	
Juliette Binoche	8	
Lambert Wilson	8	
Sean Penn	8	
Vincent Lindon	8	
Benicio del Toro	8	
Alain Delon	7	
Claudia Cardinale	7	
Gong Li	7	
Harvey Keitel	7	
Jeanne Moreau	7	
Jérémie Renier	7	
Robert Duvall	7	
Vanessa Redgrave	7	
Willem Dafoe	7	
André Dussollier	6	
Andréa Ferréol	6	
Anouk Aimée	6	
Benoît Magimel (Note: Benoît Magimel also acted in La Haine (1995), which is not listed on the official website of the festival.)	6	
Isabelle Adjani	6	
Jean Bouise	6	
Jean-Paul Belmondo	6	
Joaquin Phoenix	6	
Philippe Noiret	6	
Romy Schneider	6	
Valeria Bruni Tedeschi	6	
Nicole Garcia	6	
Penélope Cruz	6	
Vincent Cassel	6	
Emmanuelle Béart	5	
Gaspard Ulliel	5	
Javier Bardem	5	
Max von Sydow	5	
Nicole Kidman	5	
Sandra Hüller	5	
Sophia Loren	5	
Emmanuelle Bercot	4	
Julianne Moore	4	
Kristen Stewart	4	
Stellan Skarsgård	4	
Sissy Spacek	4	

=== Actors who have appeared in multiple films in main competition in the same year ===
27 actors have appeared in multiple films in main competition in the same year. Annie Girardot, Jean-Louis Trintignant, Isabelle Huppert and Léa Seydoux tie for the record for the most films in competition with three films each; Girardot and Trintignant in 1969, Huppert in 1980 and Seydoux in 2021. Huppert also had two films in main competition in 2012 and 2015.

Number	Actor	Year	Films in Official Competition	Ref(s)
3	Annie Girardot	1969	It Rains in My Village (1969), Metti, una sera a cena (1969), and Dillinger is Dead (1969)	
3	Jean-Louis Trintignant	1969	My Night at Maud's (1969), Metti, una sera a cena (1969), and Z (1969)	
3	Isabelle Huppert	1980	The Heiresses (1980), Loulou (1980), and Every Man for Himself (1980)	
3	Léa Seydoux	2021	France (2021), The Story of My Wife (2021) and The French Dispatch (2021)	
2	Ingrid Bergman	1946	Gaslight (1946) and Notorious (1946)	
2	Francisco Rabal	1961	The Hand in the Trap (1961) and Viridiana (1961)	
2	Jean-Paul Belmondo	1961	Two Women (1961) and The Lovemakers (1961)	
2	Jean-Paul Belmondo	1962	The Female: Seventy Times Seven (1962) and L'Eclisse (1962)	
2	Jeanne Moreau	1966	Chimes at Midnight (1966) and Mademoiselle (1966)	
2	Marcello Mastroianni	1970	Leo the Last (1970) and The Pizza Triangle (1970)	
2	Gian Maria Volonté	1972	The Working Class Goes to Heaven (1972) and The Mattei Affair (1972)	
2	Gérard Depardieu	1980	Loulou (1980) and My American Uncle (1980)	
2	Isabelle Adjani	1981	Quartet (1981) and Possession (1981)	
2	Nicole Garcia	1981	Les Uns et les Autres (1981) and Beau Pere (1981)	
2	Jeanne Moreau	1991	Anna Karamazoff (1991) and The Suspended Step of the Stork (1991)	
2	Catherine Deneuve	1999	Time Regained (1999) and Pola X (1999)	
2	Chloë Sevigny	2003	Dogville (2003) and The Brown Bunny (2003)	
2	Yoo Ji-tae	2004	Woman Is the Future of Man (2004) and Old Boy (2004)	
2	Chloë Sevigny	2005	Broken Flowers (2005) and Manderlay (2005)	
2	Isabelle Huppert	2012	Amour (2012) and In Another Country (2012)	
2	Isabelle Huppert	2015	Louder Than Bombs (2015) and Valley of Love (2015)	
2	Matthew McConaughey	2012	Mud (2012) and The Paperboy (2012)	
2	Rachel Weisz	2015	Youth (2015) and The Lobster (2015)	
2	Vincent Cassel	2015	Mon Roi (2015) and Tale of Tales (2015)	
2	Marion Cotillard	2016	From the Land of the Moon (2016) and It's Only the End of the World (2016)	
2	Nicole Kidman	2017	The Beguiled (2017) and The Killing of a Sacred Deer (2017)	
2	Colin Farrell	2017	The Beguiled (2017) and The Killing of a Sacred Deer (2017)	
2	Tilda Swinton	2021	Memoria (2021) and The French Dispatch (2021)	
2	Anders Danielsen Lie	2021	Bergman Island (2021) and The Worst Person in The World (2021)	
2	Sandra Hüller	2023	Anatomy of a Fall (2023) and The Zone of Interest (2023)	
2	Margaret Qualley	2024	The Substance (2024) and Kinds of Kindness (2024)	
2	Josh O'Connor	2025	The History of Sound (2025) and The Mastermind (2025)	

=== Actors who have appeared in Official Selection films for the most consecutive years ===
9 years – Marcello Mastroianni holds the record for most consecutive years in official selection. From 1977 to 1985, Mastroianni had at least one film in official selection.

8 years – Marion Cotillard. From 2011 to 2018.

7 years – Isabelle Huppert. From 1977 to 1983.

== Films with multiple wins from the Official Competition ==
- 3 wins:
  - Barton Fink (1991) – Palme d’Or, Best Director and Best Actor
  - Humanité (1999) – Grand Prix, Best Actor and Best Actress
  - The Piano Teacher (2001) – Grand Prix, Best Actor and Best Actress
- 2 wins:
  - The Lost Weekend (1946) – Palme d'Or and Best Actor
  - La symphonie pastorale (1946) – Palme d'Or and Best Actress
  - María Candelaria (1946) – Palme d'Or and Best Cinematography
  - La Bataille du rail (1946) – Jury Prize and Best Director
  - The Walls of Malapaga (1949) – Best Director and Best Actress
  - All About Eve (1951) – Jury Prize and Best Actress
  - The Browning Version (1951) – Best Screenplay and Best Actor
  - The Wages of Fear (1953) – Palme d'Or and Special Mention for Charles Vanel
  - Come Back, Little Sheba (1958) – Award for Dramatic Film and Special Mention for Shirley Booth
  - The Cranes Are Flying (1958) – Palme d'Or and Special Mention for Tatiana Samoilova
  - Brink of Life (1958) – Best Director and Best Actress
  - Long Day's Journey Into Night (1962) – Best Actor and Best Actress
  - A Taste of Honey (1962) – Best Actor and Best Actress
  - The Collector (1965) – Best Actor and Best Actress
  - Z (1969) – Jury Prize and Best Actor
  - La terrazza (1980) – Best Screenplay and Best Supporting Actress
  - A Leap in the Dark (1980) – Best Actor and Best Actress
  - Missing (1982) – Palme d'Or and Best Actor
  - The Sacrifice (1986) – Grand Prix and Best Artistic Contribution
  - A World Apart (1988) – Grand Prix and Best Actress
  - Sex, Lies, and Videotape (1989) – Palme d'Or and Best Actor
  - The Best Intentions (1992) – Palme d'Or and Best Actress
  - The Player (1992) – Best Director and Best Actor
  - The Piano (1993) – Palme d'Or and Best Actress
  - Naked (1993) – Best Director and Best Actor
  - To Live (1994) – Grand Prix and Best Actor
  - Queen Margot (1994) – Jury Prize and Best Actress
  - Carrington (1995) – Jury Special Prize and Best Actor
  - Secrets & Lies (1996) – Palme d'Or and Best Actress
  - Rosetta (1999) – Palme d'Or and Best Actress
  - Dancer in the Dark (2000) – Palme d'Or and Best Actress
  - The Man Without a Past (2002) – Grand Prix and Best Actress
  - Elephant (2003) – Palme d'Or and Best Director
  - Uzak (2003) – Grand Prix and Best Actor
  - The Barbarian Invasions (2003) – Best Screenplay and Best Actress
  - The Three Burials of Melquiades Estrada (2005) – Best Screenplay and Best Actor
  - Volver (2006) – Best Screenplay and Best Actress
  - Beyond the Hills (2012) – Best Screenplay and Best Actress
  - The Salesman (2016) – Best Screenplay and Best Actor
  - You Were Never Really Here (2017) – Best Screenplay and Best Actor
  - Emilia Pérez (2024) – Jury Prize and Best Actress
  - The Secret Agent (2025) – Best Director and Best Actor

== Films that have won both the Palme d'Or and the Palm Dog Award ==
- Anatomy of a Fall won the Palme d'Or and the Palm Dog in 2023.

== Palme d'Or winning films nominated for the Best Picture Oscar ==
As of 2026, 20 Palme d'Or winning films have been nominated for the Best Picture Oscar.

Best Picture winners designated with ** two asterisks.

Film
The Lost Weekend (1945) **
Marty (1955) **
Friendly Persuasion (1956)
M*A*S*H (1970)
The Conversation (1974)
Taxi Driver (1976)
Apocalypse Now (1979)
All That Jazz (1979)
Missing (1982)
The Mission (1986)
The Piano (1993)
Pulp Fiction (1994)
Secrets & Lies (1996)
The Pianist (2002)
The Tree of Life (2011)
Amour (2012)
Parasite (2019) **
Triangle of Sadness (2022)
Anatomy of a Fall (2023)
Anora (2024) **

== Films that have won both the Palme d'Or and the Best Picture Oscar ==
As of 2026, 4 films have won both the Palme d'Or and the Best Picture Oscar.

Film	Ref(s)
The Lost Weekend (1945)	
Marty (1955)	
Parasite (2019)	
Anora (2024)	

== Films that have won both the Palme d'Or and the Best Foreign Language Oscar ==
As of 2026, 6 films have won both the Palme d'Or and the Best Foreign Language Oscar.

Film	Ref(s)
Black Orpheus (1959)	
A Man and a Woman (1966)	
The Tin Drum (1979)	
Pelle the Conqueror (1987)	
Amour (2012)	
Parasite (2019)	

== Highest-grossing Palme d'Or winners ==
Parasite (2019) holds the record for highest-grossing Palme d'Or winner, with a worldwide box-office gross of $262 million.

Rank	Film	Worldwide box-office gross	Ref(s)
1	Parasite (2019)	$262 million	
2	Fahrenheit 9/11 (2004)	$222.4 million	
3	Pulp Fiction (1994)	$213.9 million	
4	The Piano (1993)	$140 million	
5	The Pianist (2002)	$120.1 million	
6	Apocalypse Now (1979)	$104 million	
7	M*A*S*H (1970)	$81.6 million	
8	Shoplifters (2018)	$72.6 million	
9	The Tree of Life (2011)	$61.7 million	
10	Anora (2024)	$57.3 million	
11	Secrets & Lies (1996)	$50 million	
12	Dancer in the Dark (2000)	$45.6 million	
13	All That Jazz (1979)	$37.8 million	
14	Amour (2012)	$36.8 million	
15	Sex, Lies, and Videotape (1989)	$36.7 million	
16	Anatomy of a Fall (2023)	$36 million	
17	Triangle of Sadness (2022)	$32.9 million	
18	The Class (2008)	$29.3 million	
19	Taxi Driver (1976)	$28.5 million	
20	The Wind That Shakes the Barley (2006)	$25.7 million	
21	Blowup (1966)	$20 million (or $120 million adjusted for inflation in 2007)	
22	La dolce vita (1961)	$19.6 million	
23	The White Ribbon (2009)	$19.3 million	
24	The Mission (1986)	$17.5 million	
25	I, Daniel Blake (2016)	$15.6 million	

== Cannes Film Festival firsts ==
- First woman and first actress to serve as jury president
  - Olivia de Havilland in 1965.
- First and only woman to serve as jury president twice
  - Jeanne Moreau served as jury president in 1975 and 1995.
- First and only actress to win the Best Actress award for two different films in the same year
  - Isabelle Adjani won the Best Actress award for both Quartet and Possession in 1981.
- First South American director to win the Palme d'Or
  - Anselmo Duarte (from Brazil) for O Pagador de Promessas in 1962.
- First African and Arab film to win the Palme d'Or
  - Chronicle of the Years of Fire (from Algeria) in 1975.
- First African and Arab director to win the Palme d'Or
  - Mohammed Lakhdar-Hamina (from Algeria) for Chronicle of the Years of Fire in 1975.
- First Black actor to win the Best Actor award
  - John Kitzmiller for Valley of Peace in 1957.
- First Black actress and first South African to win the Best Actress award
  - Linda Mvusi shared the Best Actress Award with her co-stars from A World Apart in 1988.
- First and only actress to win the Best Actress award two years in a row
  - Barbara Hershey won the Best Actress Award for Shy People in 1987 and for A World Apart in 1988 (shared with her co-stars).
- First female director to win the Palme d'Or
  - Jane Campion for The Piano in 1993.
- First female director to win the Best Director award
  - Yuliya Solntseva for Chronicle of Flaming Years in 1961.
- First Latin American to win the Best Director award
  - Glauber Rocha (from Brazil) for Antonio das Mortes in 1969.
- First documentary to win the Palme d'Or
  - The Silent World in 1956.
- First Asian actress to win the Best Actress award
  - Maggie Cheung (from China) for Clean in 2004.
- First film to win three awards
  - Barton Fink in 1991 (Palme d'Or, Best Director and Best Actor).
- First Latin American to win the Best Actress award
  - Norma Aleandro (from Argentina) for The Official Story in 1985.
- First Brazilian to win the Best Actress award
  - Fernanda Torres for Love Me Forever or Never in 1986.
- First Korean film to win an award
  - Painted Fire won the award for Best Director for Im Kwon-taek in 2002.
- First actors to win the Palme d'Or
  - In 2013, the Palme d'Or for the film Blue Is the Warmest Colour was shared between its director Abdellatif Kechiche and the film's two leading actresses, Léa Seydoux and Adèle Exarchopoulos. The first and only time the Palme d'Or was shared with the cast.
- First female director to serve as jury president
  - Jane Campion in 2014.
- First Korean film to win the Palme d'or
  - Parasite in 2019.
- First black female director to compete for the Palme d'Or
  - Mati Diop for Atlantics in 2019.
- First black female director to win the Grand Prix
  - Mati Diop for Atlantics in 2019.
- First Black person to serve as jury president
  - Spike Lee in 2021.
- First Pakistani film to be screened in official selection
  - Joyland screened in the Un Certain Regard section in 2022.
- First Iranian actress to win the Best Actress award
  - Zar Amir Ebrahimi for Holy Spider in 2022.
- First company to win an honorary Palme d'Or
  - Studio Ghibli in 2024.
- First American female director to serve as jury president
  - Greta Gerwig in 2024.
- First trans actor to win an acting prize
  - Karla Sofía Gascón shared the Best Actress award with her co-stars from Emilia Pérez in 2024.

== Age-related records ==
- Youngest Jury President
  - Sophia Loren, age 31, in 1966. (Note: In 2024, at age 40, Greta Gerwig became the youngest jury president since Sophia Loren in 1966.)
- Oldest Jury President
  - René Clair, age 75, in 1974.
- Youngest Palme d'Or winner
  - Louis Malle, age 24 (for The Silent World in 1956).
- Oldest Palme d'Or winner
  - Ken Loach, age 79 (for I, Daniel Blake in 2016).
- Youngest Grand Prix winner
  - Xavier Dolan, age 27 (for It's Only the End of the World in 2016).
- Youngest Jury Prize winner
  - Xavier Dolan, age 25 (for Mommy in 2014).
- Oldest Jury Prize winner
  - Jean-Luc Godard, age 83 (for Goodbye to Language in 2014).
- Youngest Best Actress winner
  - Jodhi May, age 12 (for A World Apart in 1988).
- Oldest Best Actress winner
  - Chus Lampreave, age 75 (for Volver in 2006).
- Youngest Best Actor winner
  - Yuya Yagira, age 14 (for Nobody Knows in 2004).
- Oldest Best Actor winner
  - Bruce Dern, age 76 (for Nebraska in 2013).

== See also ==
- Cannes Film Festival
- List of Academy Award records
