= 1988 New York Film Critics Circle Awards =

54th New York Film Critics Circle Awards

54th New York Film Critics Circle Awards

January 15, 1989

Best Film:
The Accidental Tourist

The 54th New York Film Critics Circle Awards honored the best filmmaking of 1988. The winners were announced on 15 December 1988 and the awards were given on 15 January 1989.

== Winners ==
- Best Actor:
  - Jeremy Irons - Dead Ringers
  - Runners-up: Dustin Hoffman - Rain Man, Tom Hanks - Big and Gene Hackman - Mississippi Burning
- Best Actress:
  - Meryl Streep - A Cry in the Dark
  - Runners-up: Jodie Foster - The Accused, Melanie Griffith - Working Girl and Carmen Maura - Women on the Verge of a Nervous Breakdown (Mujeres al borde de un ataque de nervios)
- Best Cinematography:
  - Henri Alekan - Wings of Desire (Der Himmel über Berlin)
  - Runners-up: Sven Nykvist - The Unbearable Lightness of Being and Jörgen Persson - Pelle the Conqueror (Pelle erobreren)
- Best Director:
  - Chris Menges - A World Apart
  - Runners-up: Clint Eastwood - Bird, Wim Wenders - Wings of Desire (Der Himmel über Berlin) and Lawrence Kasdan - The Accidental Tourist
- Best Documentary:
  - The Thin Blue Line
- Best Film:
  - The Accidental Tourist
  - Runners-up: A World Apart and Dead Ringers
- Best Foreign Language Film:
  - Women on the Verge of a Nervous Breakdown (Mujeres al borde de un ataque de nervios) • Spain
  - Runner-up: Au Revoir Les Enfants • France/West Germany/Italy
- Best Screenplay:
  - Ron Shelton - Bull Durham
  - Runners-up: Shawn Slovo - A World Apart and Frank Galati and Lawrence Kasdan - The Accidental Tourist
- Best Supporting Actor:
  - Dean Stockwell - Married to the Mob and Tucker: The Man and His Dream
  - Runners-up: Alec Guinness - Little Dorrit, Martin Landau - Tucker: The Man and His Dream and Tim Robbins - Bull Durham
- Best Supporting Actress:
  - Diane Venora - Bird
  - Runner-up: Jodhi May - A World Apart
