= La Symphonie pastorale =

Novel by André Gide

- First edition cover (1919)
- Author: André Gide
- Translator: Walter Ballenberger, Dorothy Bussy
- Language: French
- Genre: Novella
- Set in: Romandy, 1890s
- Publisher: Les Éditions de la Nouvelle Revue Française
- Publication date: 1919
- Pages: 151
- Dewey Decimal: 843.912

La Symphonie pastorale is a French novella written by André Gide first published in October and November 1919 in La Nouvelle Revue Française N° 73 and N° 74.

== Plot ==
A pastor adopts a young blind girl whom his daughter, Charlotte, names "Gertrude". The title refers to Beethoven's Sixth Symphony (also known as the Pastoral Symphony), which the pastor takes Gertrude to hear. It also refers to the pastor's own symphony with Gertrude. His wife, Amélie, resents Gertrude because the pastor dedicates more attention to Gertrude than to their five biological children. She tries to prompt him to a recognition of the true nature of his feelings for the young woman in his care. Her ability to "see" is contrasted with the "blindness" of the pastor in this regard and the reader is invited to judge him on his intellectual dishonesty. As a religious man, the pastor takes the Bible very seriously and tries to preserve Gertrude's innocence by protecting her from the concept of sin.

Because the pastor is really the main character in Gertrude's limited world, she feels herself to be in love with him and to some extent he has similar feelings toward her. When his eldest son Jacques, who is about the same age as Gertrude, asks to marry her, the pastor becomes jealous and refuses despite the fact that Jacques is obviously in love with her.

Gertrude eventually gets an operation to repair her eyesight and, having gained the ability to see, realizes that she loves Jacques and not the pastor. However, Jacques has renounced his love for her, converted to Catholicism and become a priest. Gertrude attempts suicide by jumping into a river, but this fails and she is rescued and contracts pneumonia. She realizes that the pastor is an old man, and the man she pictured when she was blind was Jacques. She tells the pastor this shortly before her death.

== Adaptations ==
The work was made into a film in 1946 by Jean Delannoy, with Michèle Morgan in the principal role as Gertrude. A version was produced for Australian television in 1958.

== Thematic analysis ==
The story deals with the idea of blindness; although Gertrude is evidently blind physically, the pastor himself is blind in his morality, seemingly unaware of the full extent of his sinfulness in his obsession for Gertrude.

As well as blindness, sin is a prevalent concept in the novel. The pastor treats the love that Jacques feels for Gertrude as a sin without taking into account that he himself, as a married man and a religious figure, has profound emotional sentiments for a young girl, whom he adopted almost as a daughter. He also fails to take into account the fact that, as a pastor, he would inevitably be viewed by his congregation to be someone who should present himself as an example of strong virtues and high moral values.

Religion is therefore a central theme in the novel—the pastor seems to mistake the love for a woman (or a girl) for the love of God. In the same vein, though he believes he is serving God, the only person he is serving is himself.
