= Lounge Chair (film) =

1988 film

- Directed by: Jean-François Amiguet
- Written by: Anne Gonthier; Jean-François Goyet
- Produced by: Marie-Pascale Osterrieth; Jean-Louis Porchet; Gérard Ruey
- Starring: Jérôme Anger
- Cinematography: Emmanuel Machuel
- Edited by: Elisabeth Waelchli
- Release date: 15 June 1988
- Running time: 80 minutes
- Countries: Switzerland; France
- Language: French

Lounge Chair (French: La méridienne) is a 1988 Swiss-French drama film directed by Jean-François Amiguet. It was screened in the Un Certain Regard section at the 1988 Cannes Film Festival. The film was selected as the Swiss entry for the Best Foreign Language Film at the 61st Academy Awards, but was not accepted as a nominee.

== Cast ==
- Jérôme Anger as François
- Kristin Scott Thomas as Marie
- Sylvie Orcier as Marthe
- Patrice Kerbrat as Dubois, le détective
- Alice de Poncheville as Léa
- Judith Godrèche as Stéphane
- Michel Voïta as Le libraire
- Jean Francois Aupied as Narrator
- Véronique Farina as Fleuriste

== See also ==
- List of submissions to the 61st Academy Awards for Best Foreign Language Film
- List of Swiss submissions for the Academy Award for Best Foreign Language Film
