= Jean-François Amiguet =

Swiss film director and screenwriter

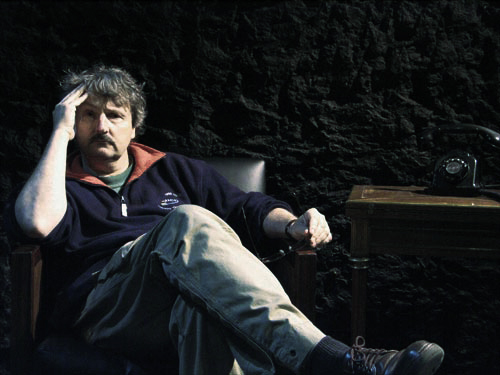
- Born: 1950 (age 75–76); Vevey, Switzerland
- Occupations: Film director Screenwriter
- Years active: 1983-2003

Jean-François Amiguet (born 1950) is a Swiss film director and screenwriter. His film Lounge Chair was screened in the Un Certain Regard section at the 1988 Cannes Film Festival.

== Filmography ==
- Alexandre (1983)
- La méridienne (1988)
- Le film du cinéma suisse (1991)
- L'écrivain public (1993)
- Histoires de fête (2000)
- Au sud des nuages (2003)
- Elle est pas belle, la vie? on Gérald Métroz (2006)
