= Sister My Sister =

1994 film by Nancy Meckler

- DVD cover
- Directed by: Nancy Meckler
- Screenplay by: Wendy Kesselman
- Based on: My Sister in This House by Wendy Kesselman
- Produced by: Norma Heyman
- Starring: Julie Walters; Joely Richardson; Jodhi May; Sophie Thursfield
- Cinematography: Ashley Rowe
- Edited by: David Stiven
- Music by: Stephen Warbeck
- Distributed by: British Screen Productions; Channel Four Films; NFH Productions
- Release date: 1994
- Running time: 89 mins
- Country: United Kingdom
- Language: English

Sister My Sister is a 1994 film starring British actresses Julie Walters, Joely Richardson, and Jodhi May. The film was directed by Nancy Meckler and written by Wendy Kesselman, based on her own play, My Sister in This House.

The film is based on the Papin murder case, a 1933 incident in Le Mans, France, in which two sisters brutally murdered their employer and her daughter. The murder shocked the country, and there was much speculation about the sisters, including allegations that they were having an incestuous lesbian affair.

== Plot ==
In 1933 France, Christine (Richardson) is the maid of the well-to-do middle-aged widow Madame Danzard (Julie Walters) and her teenage daughter Isabelle (Sophie Thursfield). Her younger sister, Lea (May) is hired on the recommendation of Christine. The two sisters become increasingly alienated from their employer, separated by barriers between the classes. The Danzards look down on the sisters for trivial things, and it soon becomes the norm for the two pairs of women to not even speak directly to each other.

With only each other to turn to, the sisters' relationship becomes sexual, adding to the tension between the sisters and the Danzards. Both of them deal with trauma brought on by strained relationships with their mother and others of the church. Lea was always their mother's favorite and after Christine convinces her to no longer give her all their earnings, there is a falling out and they cut ties with her. Following this, they have more money for themselves, their work begins slipping, and they become more thin and tired, all of which is noted by the meticulous Madame Danzard. Over time, there are continual rumors of Isabelle getting married and moving out. Christine becomes paranoid and jealous that Lea will go with her when that day comes, leaving her with nothing and no one, but Lea assures her this isn’t the case. Christine fears she is a monster like her mother; she has clear anger problems, but the emotionally fragile Lea remains with her.

One day, the iron blows a fuse and burns Isabelle’s blouse as Lea was preparing it. Short on money and time, the sisters resign themselves to their fate; when the Danzards return from a shopping trip, Christine tries to explain what happened. The widow claims she knows about the incestuous relationship between the sisters and they’ll never work again once word gets out. The sisters fly into a rage and brutally murder the widow and her daughter. The movie ends on a crime report detailing the state of the corpses as someone knocks on the mansion door. The sisters cling to each other desperately as audio plays of an investigator questioning them about the murder, followed by Christine screaming for Lea.

== Cast ==
- Julie Walters as Madame Danzard
- Joely Richardson as Christine Papin
- Jodhi May as Lea Papin
- Sophie Thursfield as Isabelle Danzard
- Amelda Brown as Visitor #1
- Lucita Pope as Visitor #2
- Kate Gartside as Sister Veronica
- Aimee Schmidt as Young Lea
- Gabriella Schmidt as Young Christine

== Production ==
The film was shot at Pinewood Studios in England and in Amiens, France.

== Related films ==
The Papin case was also the subject of The Maids, a play by Jean Genet written in 1949 that was adapted by Christopher Miles into a 1974 film of the same name. It starred Glenda Jackson and Susannah York as the maids, and Vivien Merchant as their employer.

It is also mentioned in a 1995 French film of Claude Chabrol, La Cérémonie, with Isabelle Huppert and Sandrine Bonnaire. The characters are not the Papin sisters, but are two women that end up murdering their employer. It is an adaptation from the novel A Judgement in Stone by Ruth Rendell.

The story was also filmed as Murderous Maids, a French film starring Sylvie Testud and Julie-Marie Parmentier, and directed by Jean-Pierre Denis.

== See also ==
- List of LGBT-related films directed by women
