= A World Apart (1988 film) =

- A World Apart (Video Cover)
- Directed by: Chris Menges
- Written by: Shawn Slovo
- Produced by: Sarah Radclyffe
- Starring: Barbara Hershey; David Suchet; Jeroen Krabbé; Paul Freeman; Tim Roth; Jodhi May
- Cinematography: Peter Biziou
- Edited by: Nicholas Gaster
- Music by: Hans Zimmer
- Production company: Working Title Films
- Distributed by: Atlantic Releasing Corporation
- Release dates: May 1988 (Cannes); 17 June 1988 (New York); August 1988 (London)
- Running time: 113 minutes
- Countries: United Kingdom; Zimbabwe
- Language: English
- Budget: £2.68 million
- Box office: $8 million

A World Apart is a 1988 anti-apartheid drama film directed by Chris Menges, and starring Barbara Hershey, David Suchet, Jeroen Krabbé, Paul Freeman, Tim Roth and Jodhi May. Written by Shawn Slovo, it is based on the lives of Slovo's parents, Ruth First and Joe Slovo. The film was a co-production between companies from the UK and Zimbabwe, and was filmed on location in northeastern Zimbabwe.. It features Hans Zimmer's first non-collaborative film score.

The film received acclaim, winning BAFTA Awards for Best Screenplay for Shawn Slovo and Best Supporting Actor for David Suchet, as well as the Special Grand Prize of the Jury at the 1988 Cannes Film Festival.

== Plot ==
Set in Johannesburg in 1963, the film examines the abrupt ending of 13-year-old Molly's blithe childhood when her father, a member of the South African Communist Party, flees into exile. Ostracised by her peers, Molly draws closer to her mother who is part of the campaign against apartheid. Their relationship is challenged by hardship, political intimidation, and the mother's eventual arrest.

The film title references both the gap between the mother and her teenage girl, who fails to grasp why their family is so fixated with events beyond their comfortable white suburb, and another separating this world from that of South Africa's poverty-stricken black townships.

Essentially, the film is a tribute to Ruth First by her daughter and concludes in a moment of epiphany as Molly comes to terms with her mother's activism and understands that she too must play a part in the struggle against racial injustice.

== Cast ==
- Jodhi May as Molly Roth
- Jeroen Krabbé as Gus Roth
- Barbara Hershey as Diana Roth
- Linda Mvusi as Elsie
- Nadine Chalmers as Yvonne Abelson
- Kate Fitzpatrick as June Abelson
- Tim Roth as Harold
- Carolyn Clayton-Cragg as Myriam Roth
- Albee Lesotho as Solomon
- Yvonne Bryceland as Bertha
- Merav Gruer as Jude Roth
- Paul Freeman as Kruger
- Rosalie Crutchley as Mrs. Harris
- Adrian Dunbar as Le Roux
- David Suchet as Muller
- Jude Akuwudike as Priest
- Nomaziko Zondo as Thandile

== Reception ==
The film opened at Cinema 1 in New York City on 17 June 1988.

A World Apart has an overall approval rating of 91% on Rotten Tomatoes from 11 critics.

The film was placed on 40 critics' top ten lists, making it one of the most acclaimed films of 1988.

=== Box office ===
The film grossed $20,815 in its opening weekend in New York and $35,835 (£21,200) for the week. Two months later it opened at the Curzon West End in London and sold out for the week, with a gross of £43,167. It went on to gross $8 million worldwide, including $2,326,800 in the United States and Canada and £800,000 at the UK box office.

== Awards and nominations ==
Award	Category	Nominee	Outcome	Ref.
BAFTA Awards	Best Original Screenplay	Shawn Slovo	Won	
BAFTA Awards	Best Supporting Actor	David Suchet	Nominated	
1988 Cannes Film Festival	Best Actress	Jodhi May, Barbara Hershey, Linda Mvusi	Won (Note: Three-way tie)	
1988 Cannes Film Festival	Golden Palm		Nominated	
1988 Cannes Film Festival	Special Grand Prize of the Jury	Chris Menges	Won	
1988 Cannes Film Festival	Prize of the Ecumenical Jury	Chris Menges	Won	
Evening Standard British Film Awards	Most Promising Newcomer	Jodhi May	Won (Note: Tied with Kristin Scott Thomas for A Handful of Dust)	
Guldbagge Awards	Best Foreign Language Film		Won	
Independent Spirit Awards	Best Foreign Film		Nominated	
New York Film Critics Circle Awards	Best Director	Chris Menges	Won	
