= 1988 Cannes Film Festival =

- Official poster of the 41st Cannes Film Festival, featuring an original illustration by Tibor Timar.
- Opening film: The Big Blue
- Closing film: Willow
- Location: Cannes, France
- Founded: 1946
- Awards: Palme d'Or: Pelle the Conqueror
- No. of films: 21 (In Competition)
- Festival date: 11 May 1988 – 23 May 1988
- Website: festival-cannes.com/en

Cannes Film Festival
- 1989 1987

The 41st Cannes Film Festival took place from 11 to 23 May 1988. Italian filmmaker Ettore Scola served as jury president for the main competition.

Danish filmmaker Bille August won the Palme d'Or, the festival's top prize, for his drama film Pelle the Conqueror.

The festival opened with The Big Blue by Luc Besson, and closed with Willow by Ron Howard.

== Juries ==
=== Main competition ===
- Ettore Scola, Italian filmmaker - Jury President
- Claude Berri, French filmmaker, producer, and actor
- William Goldman, American author
- Nastassja Kinski, German actress
- George Miller, Australian filmmaker
- Robby Müller, Dutch cinematographer
- Héctor Olivera, Argentine filmmaker and producer
- David Robinson, British film critic
- Yelena Safonova, Soviet actress
- Philippe Sarde, French composer

=== Camera d'Or ===
- Danièle Delorme, French actress - Jury President
- Carlos Avellar, journalist
- Jacques Champreux, French director
- Henry Chapier, French film critic
- Chantal Calafato, cinephile
- Bernard Jubard
- Ekaterina Oproiu, journalist
- David Streiff, cinephile

== Official selection ==
=== In Competition ===
The following feature films competed for the Palme d'Or:

English title	Original title	Director(s)	Production country
The Abyss	L'oeuvre au noir	André Delvaux	France, Belgium
Bird		Clint Eastwood	United States
The Cannibals	Os Canibais	Manoel de Oliveira	Portugal
Chocolat		Claire Denis	France, Cameroon
El Dorado		Carlos Saura	Spain
Drowning by Numbers		Peter Greenaway	United Kingdom, Netherlands
L'enfance de l'art		Francis Girod	France
Hanussen		István Szabó	Hungary, West Germany, Austria
King of the Children	孩子王	Chen Kaige	China
Love and Fear	Fürchten und Lieben	Margarethe von Trotta	West Germany, France, Italy
El Lute II: Tomorrow I'll be Free	El Lute II: mañana seré libre	Vicente Aranda	Spain
Miles from Home		Gary Sinise	United States
Pascali's Island		James Dearden	United Kingdom
The Passenger – Welcome to Germany	Der Passagier – Welcome to Germany	Thomas Brasch	West Germany
Patty Hearst		Paul Schrader	United States
Pelle the Conqueror	Pelle Erobreren	Bille August	Denmark, Sweden
The Navigator: A Medieval Odyssey		Vincent Ward	New Zealand, Australia
A Short Film About Killing	Krótki film o zabijaniu	Krzysztof Kieślowski	Poland
South	Sur	Fernando Solanas	Argentina
A World Apart		Chris Menges	United Kingdom, Zimbabwe
Wuthering Heights	嵐が丘	Yoshishige Yoshida	Japan

=== Un Certain Regard ===
The following films were selected for the Un Certain Regard section:

English title	Original title	Director(s)	Production country
Among Grey Stones	Среди серых камней	Kira Muratova	Soviet Union
Antarjali Jatra	অন্তর্জলী যাত্রা	Goutam Ghose	India
Gece Yolculuğu		Ömer Kavur	Turkey
The Harms Case	Slučaj Harms	Slobodan D. Pesic	Yugoslavia
Havinck		Frans Weisz	Netherlands
Hotel Terminus: The Life and Times of Klaus Barbie	Hôtel Terminus: Klaus Barbie, sa vie et son temps	Marcel Ophuls	United States
It's Happening Tomorrow	Domani accadrà	Daniele Luchetti	Italy
Katinka	Ved vejen	Max von Sydow	Denmark, Sweden
Lamento		François Dupeyron	France
Lounge Chair	La méridienne	Jean-François Amiguet	Switzerland, France
Mapantsula		Oliver Schmitz	South Africa
The Mask	La maschera	Fiorella Infascelli	Italy
Natalia		Bernard Cohn	France
On the Silver Globe	Na srebrnym globie	Andrzej Żuławski	Poland
The Raggedy Rawney		Bob Hoskins	United Kingdom
The Revolving Doors	Les Portes tournantes	Francis Mankiewicz	Canada, France
Rouge of the North	怨女	Fred Tan	Taiwan
Sand and Blood	De sable et de sang	Jeanne Labrune	France
A Song of Air		Merilee Bennett	Australia
Stalin's Disciples	ילדי סטאלין	Nadav Levitan	Israel
Time of Violence	Време на насилие	Ludmil Staikov	Bulgaria
Why?	Proc?	Karel Smyczek	Czechoslovakia

=== Out of Competition ===
The following films were selected to be screened out of competition:

English title	Original title	Director(s)	Production country
The Big Blue (opening film)	Le Grand Bleu	Luc Besson	France, United States, Italy
The Blue Iguana		John Lafia	United States
The Milagro Beanfield War		Robert Redford	United States
Willow (closing film)		Ron Howard	United States

=== Special Screenings ===
The following films were selected to receive a special screening:

English title	Original title	Director(s)	Production country
Dear America: Letters Home from Vietnam		Bill Couturié	United States
Histoire(s) du cinéma		Jean-Luc Godard	France, Switzerland

=== Short film competition ===
The following short films competed for the Palme d'Or du court métrage:

- Ab Ovo / Homoknyomok (Traces of Sand) by Ferenc Cako
- Bukpytacy (Fioritures) by Gary Bardine
- Cat & Mousse by David Lawson
- Chet's Romance by Bertrand Fevre
- Out of Town by Norman Hull
- Pas-ta-shoot-ah by Maurizio Forestieri
- Pleasure Domes by Maggie Fooke
- Sculpture Physique by Yann Piquer, Jean Marie Maddeddu
- Super Freak by Gisela Ekholm, Per Ekholm

== Parallel sections ==
=== International Critics' Week ===
The following feature films were screened for the 27th International Critics' Week (27e Semaine de la Critique):

Feature film competition

- Begurebis gadaprena by Temür Babluani (Soviet Union)
- Full Moon (Dolunay) by Sahin Kaygun (Turkey)
- Tokyo Pop by Fran Rubel Kuzui (USA)
- The Well (Jing) by Yalin Li (China)
- Testament by John Akomfrah (United Kingdom)
- Portrait of a Life (Ekti Jiban) by Raja Mitra (India)
- My Dear Subject (Mon cher sujet) by Anne-Marie Miéville (France, Switzerland)

Short film competition

- La face cachée de la lune by Yvon Marciano (France)
- Metropolis Apocalypse by Jon Jacobs (United Kingdom)
- Artisten (The Artist) by Jonas Grimas (Sweden)
- Klatka (The cage) by Olaf Olszewski (Poland)
- Cidadao Jatoba (Citizen Jatoba) by Maria Luiza Aboïm (Brazil)
- Blues Black and White by Markus Imboden (Switzerland)

=== Directors' Fortnight ===
The following feature films were screened for the 1988 Directors' Fortnight (Quinzaine des Réalizateurs):

- Amerika, Terra Incognita by Diego Risquez
- Daughter of the Nile (Ni luo he nu er) by Hou Hsiao-Hsien
- The Venus Trap by Robert Van Ackeren
- Distant Voices, Still Lives by Terence Davies
- Ei by Danniel Danniel
- The Heat Line (La Ligne de chaleur) by Hubert-Yves Rose
- Herseye Ragmen by Orhan Oguz
- Légendes Vivantes by Nodar Managadzé
- Mars Froid by Igor Minayev
- Natal da Portela by Paulo Cezar Saraceni
- Noujoum A’nahar by Oussama Mohammad
- Salaam Bombay! by Mira Nair
- Summer Thefts (Sarikat Sayfeya) by Yousry Nasrallah
- Soursweet by Mike Newell
- Stormy Monday by Mike Figgis
- The Story of Fausta (Romance Da Empregada) by Bruno Barreto
- Tabataba by Raymond Rajaonarivelo
- The Suitors by Ghasem Ebrahimian

== Official Awards ==
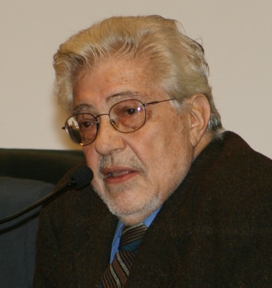
Ettore Scola, Jury President of the Main competition

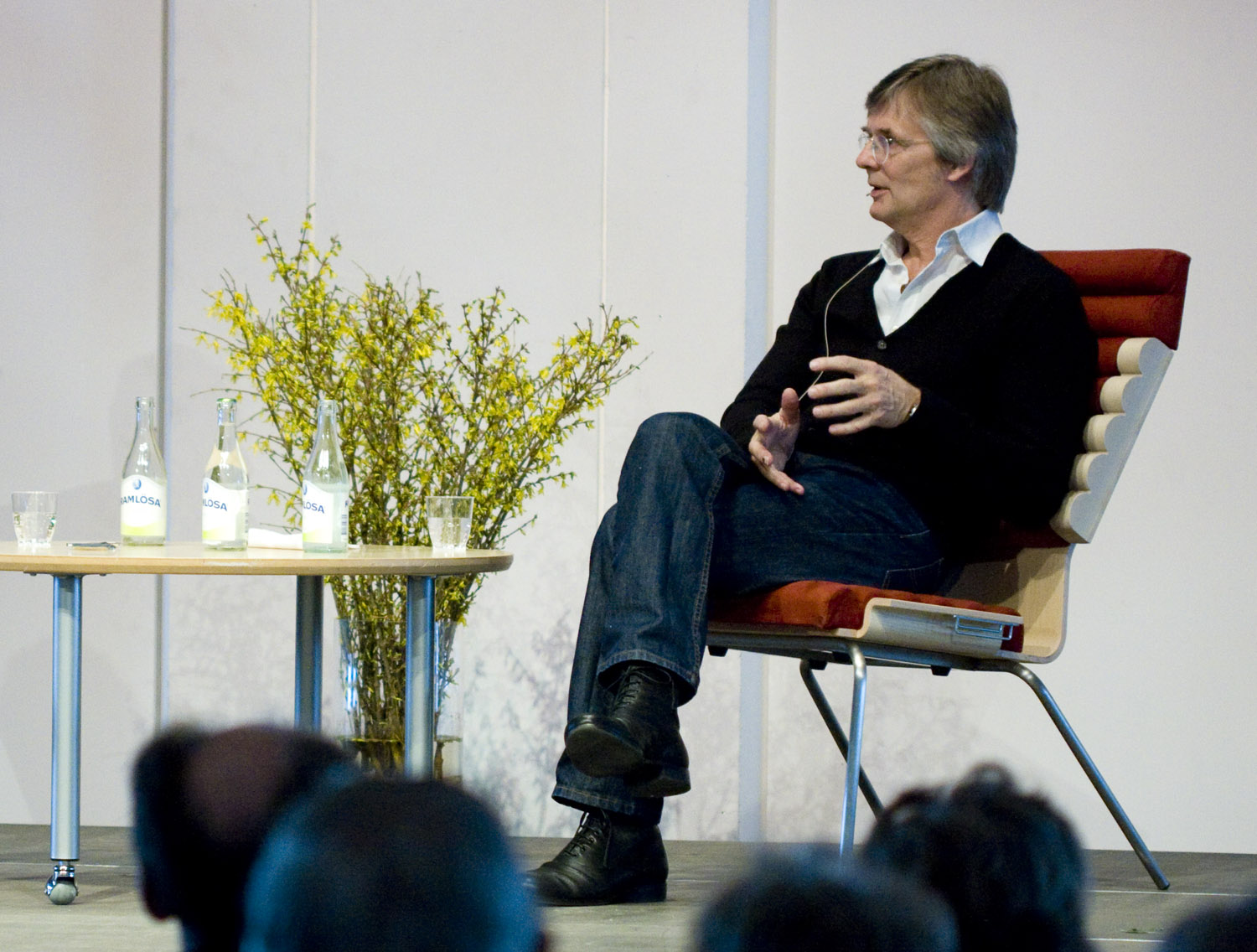
Bille August, 1988 Palme d'Or winner

=== In Competition ===
- Palme d'Or: Pelle the Conqueror by Bille August
- Grand Prix: A World Apart by Chris Menges
- Best Director: Fernando Solanas for Sur
- Best Actress: Barbara Hershey, Jodhi May and Linda Mvusi for A World Apart
- Best Actor: Forest Whitaker for Bird
- Best Artistic Contribution: Peter Greenaway for Drowning by Numbers
- Jury Prize: A Short Film About Killing by Krzysztof Kieślowski

=== Caméra d'Or ===
- Salaam Bombay! by Mira Nair

Short films

=== Short Film Palme d'Or ===
- Vykrutasy by Garri Bardin
- Short Film Prize for Animation: Traces of Sand by Ferenc Cako
- Short Film Prize for Fiction: Physical Sculpture by Yann Piquer and Jean Marie Maddeddu

== Independent Awards ==
=== FIPRESCI Prizes ===
- A Short Film About Killing by Krzysztof Kieślowski (In competition)
- Hotel Terminus: The Life and Times of Klaus Barbie by Marcel Ophüls (Un Certain Regard)
- Distant Voices, Still Lives by Terence Davies (Directors' Fortnight)

=== Commission Supérieure Technique ===
- Technical Grand Prize: Bird, for the quality of the soundtrack

=== Prize of the Ecumenical Jury ===
- A World Apart by Chris Menges
  - Special Mention: The Revolving Doors by Francis Mankiewicz

=== Award of the Youth ===
- Foreign Film: Herseye Ragmen by Orhan Oguz
- French Film: Mon cher sujet by Anne-Marie Miéville

=== Other awards ===
- Audience Award: Salaam Bombay! by Mira Nair

== Media ==
- INA: Opening of the 1988 Cannes Festival (commentary in French)
- INA: List of winners of the 1988 festival (commentary in French)
