= Pastoral Symphony (film) =

1946 film by Jean Delannoy

- Film poster
- French: La Symphonie pastorale
- Directed by: Jean Delannoy
- Written by: Jean Aurenche
- Based on: La Symphonie pastorale by André Gide
- Produced by: Joseph Bercholz; Edouard Gide
- Starring: Pierre Blanchar; Michèle Morgan; Jean Desailly
- Cinematography: Armand Thirard
- Edited by: Suzette Bouveret
- Music by: Georges Auric
- Production company: Les Films Gibé
- Distributed by: Pathé Consortium Cinéma
- Release date: September 1946 (Cannes Film Festival)
- Running time: 110 minutes
- Country: France
- Language: French

Pastoral Symphony (French: La Symphonie pastorale) is a 1946 French drama film directed by Jean Delannoy and starring Michèle Morgan, Pierre Blanchar and Jean Desailly.

The film is based on the novella La Symphonie pastorale by André Gide and adapted to the screen by Jean Aurenche.It was shot at the Neuilly Studios in Paris with sets designed by the art director René Renoux. Location shooting took place around Rossinière in Switzerland. The film's score was by Georges Auric. At the 1946 Cannes Film Festival, it won the Grand Prix (equivalent of the Palme d'Or) and the Best Actress award for Michèle Morgan.

It was the film chosen to be shown at the opening gala of the Cameo cinema in Edinburgh, Scotland, in March 1949, and a rare surviving print with English subtitles was shown there again in 2009 to celebrate the film's 60th anniversary, courtesy of the BFI.

== Plot summary ==
The pastor of a mountain village adopts a small blind girl, Gertrude. As Gertrude grows up into an attractive young woman, the pastor, now middle-aged, realises that he is in love with her. To his chagrin, his adopted son, Jacques, is also in love with Gertrude, even though he is shortly to be married to another woman.

Jacques's fiancée is jealous of Gertrude and arranges for her to see a doctor in the hope that she might be cured and to enable Jacques to choose equally between the two women.

Miraculously, Gertrude's sight is restored and she returns to the village a changed woman. Unable to accept Jacques' love and disappointed by the pastor's affections for her, she realises that her former happiness has been lost forever.

== Cast ==
- Michèle Morgan as Gertrude
- Pierre Blanchar as Le pasteur Jean Martens
- Line Noro as Amélie Martens - sa femme
- Jean Desailly as Jacques Martens - son fils
- Andrée Clément as Piette Castéran
- Jacques Louvigny as Castéran
- Rosine Luguet as Charlotte Martens
- Mona Dol as Soeur Claire
- Robert Demorget as Pierre Martens
- Hélène Dassonville as Mademoiselle de la Grange
- Germaine Michel as La vieille paysanne
- Florence Brière as Une amie de Gertrude
- Albert Glado as Paul Martens

== Bibliography ==
- Crisp, Colin. French Cinema—A Critical Filmography: Volume 2, 1940–1958. Indiana University Press, 2015.
- Leahy, Sarah & Vanderschelden, Isabelle. Screenwriters in French cinema. Manchester University Press, 2021.
