= Cannes Film Festival Award for Best Actress =

Award presented at the Cannes Film Festival

Best Actress Award
- Prix d'interprétation féminine (French)
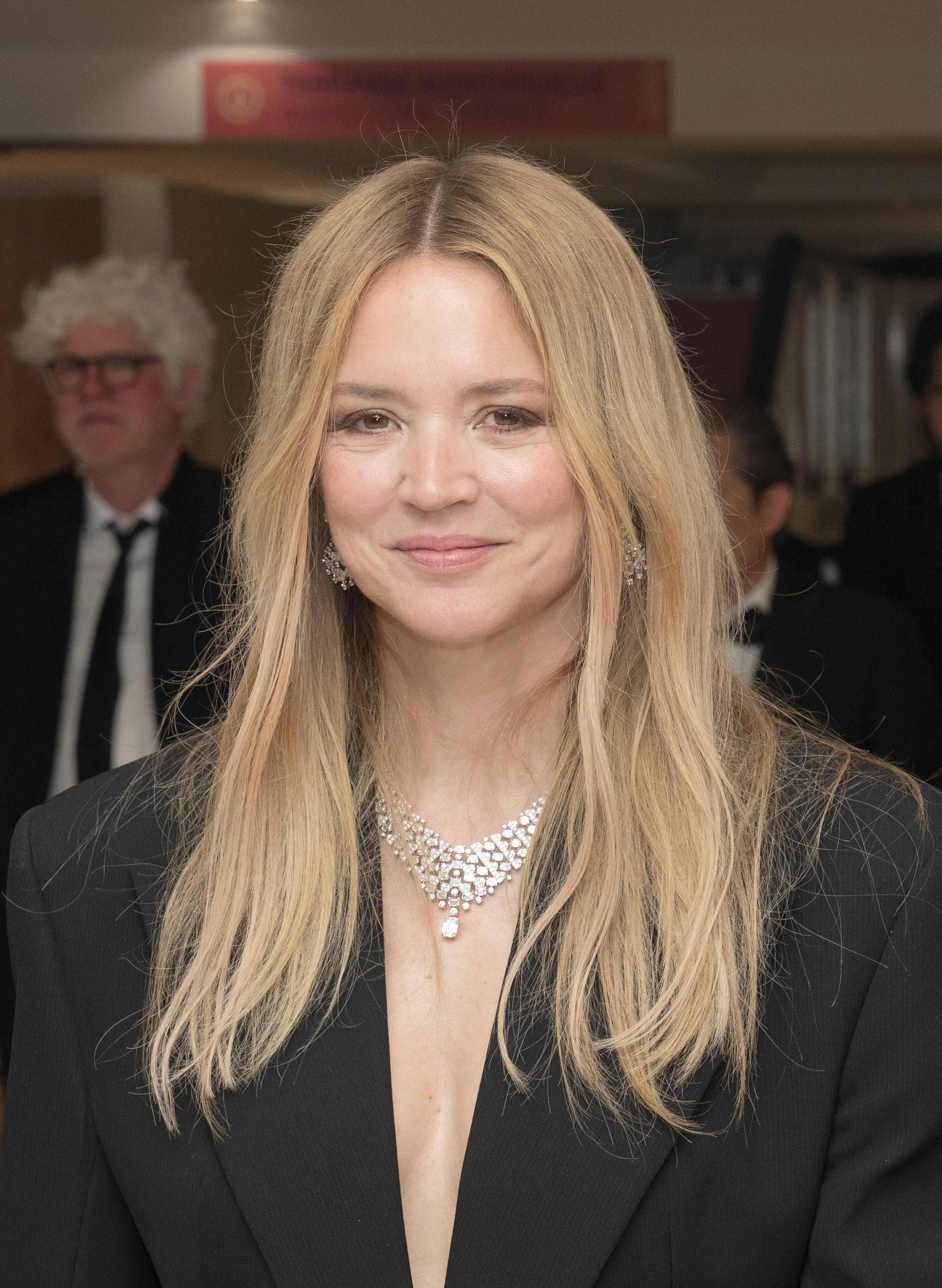
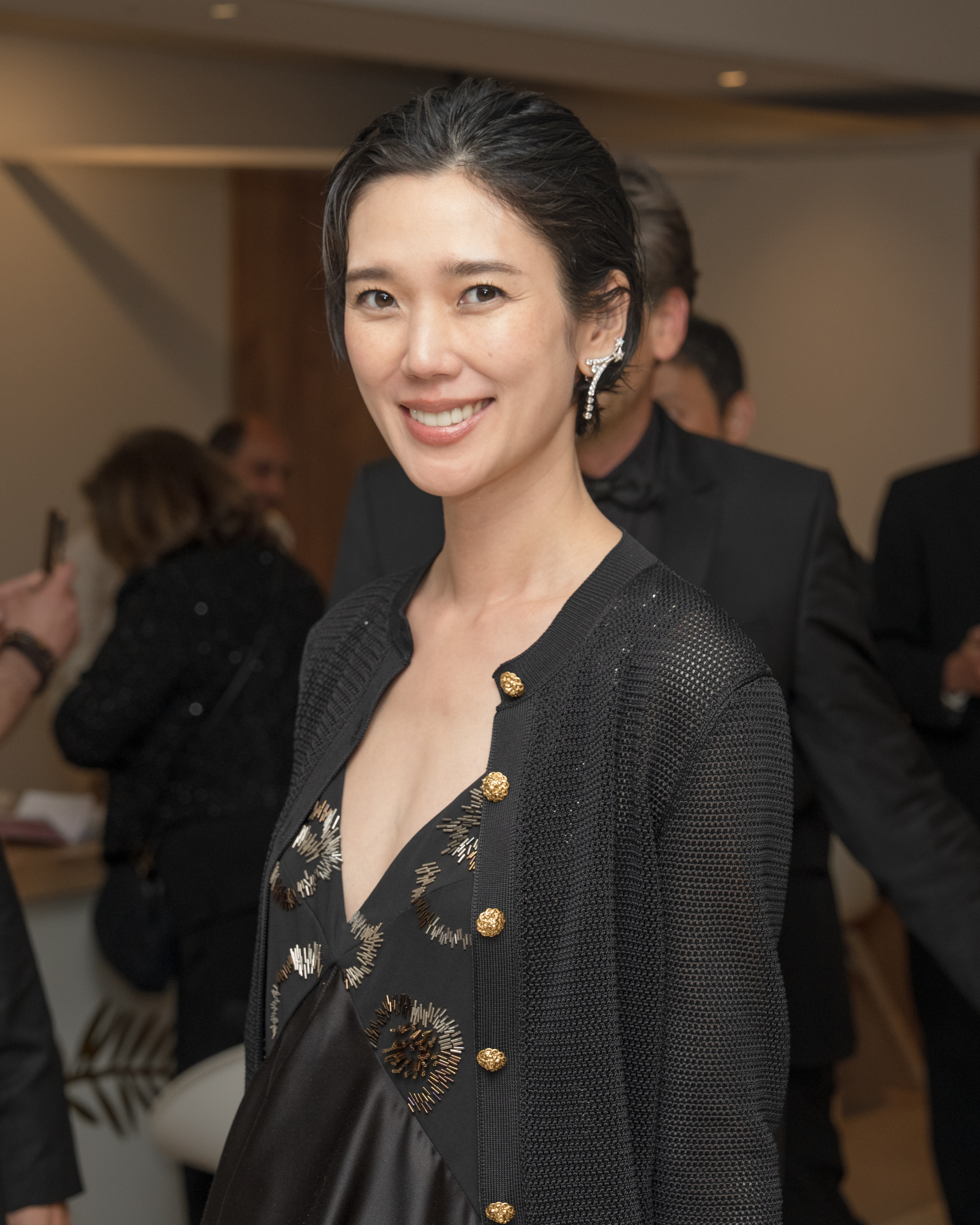
- 2026 recipients: Virginie Efira and Tao Okamoto
- Awarded for: Best Performance by an Actress
- Country: France
- Presented by: Cannes Film Festival
- First award: 1946
- Currently held by: Virginie Efira and Tao Okamoto for All of a Sudden (2026)
- Website: www.festival-cannes.com/en/

The Best Actress Award (French: Prix d'interprétation féminine) is an award presented at the Cannes Film Festival since 1946. It is given to an actress who has delivered an outstanding performance and chosen by the jury from the films in official competition slate at the festival.

Its most recent winners were Virginie Efira and Tao Okamoto for All of a Sudden at the 2026 Cannes Film Festival.

== History ==
The award was first presented in 1946 at the 1946 Cannes Film Festival, Michèle Morgan was the inaugural winner of the award for Pastoral Symphony.

The prize was not awarded on three occasions (1947, 1953, and 1954). The festival was not held at all in 1948, 1950, and 2020. In 1968, no awards were given as the festival was called off mid-way due to the May 1968 events in France.

On six occasions, the jury has awarded multiple women (more than 2) the prize for the same film. The films were: A Big Family (1955), Brink of Life (1958), A World Apart (1988), Volver (2006), Emilia Pérez (2024), and All of a Sudden (2026).

Vanessa Redgrave, Barbara Hershey, Helen Mirren, and Isabelle Huppert have won the most awards in this category, each winning twice. Hershey is the only actress to win the award in consecutive years, for Shy People (1987) and A World Apart (1988).

Isabelle Adjani is the only actress to win for roles in two different films in the same competition, for her performances in Possession and Quartet in 1981.

The award can be for lead or supporting roles, with the exception of the period from 1979 to 1981, when the festival used to award a separate "Best Supporting Actress" prize. The jury also, on occasion, cites actresses with a special citation that is separate from the main award.

== Winners ==
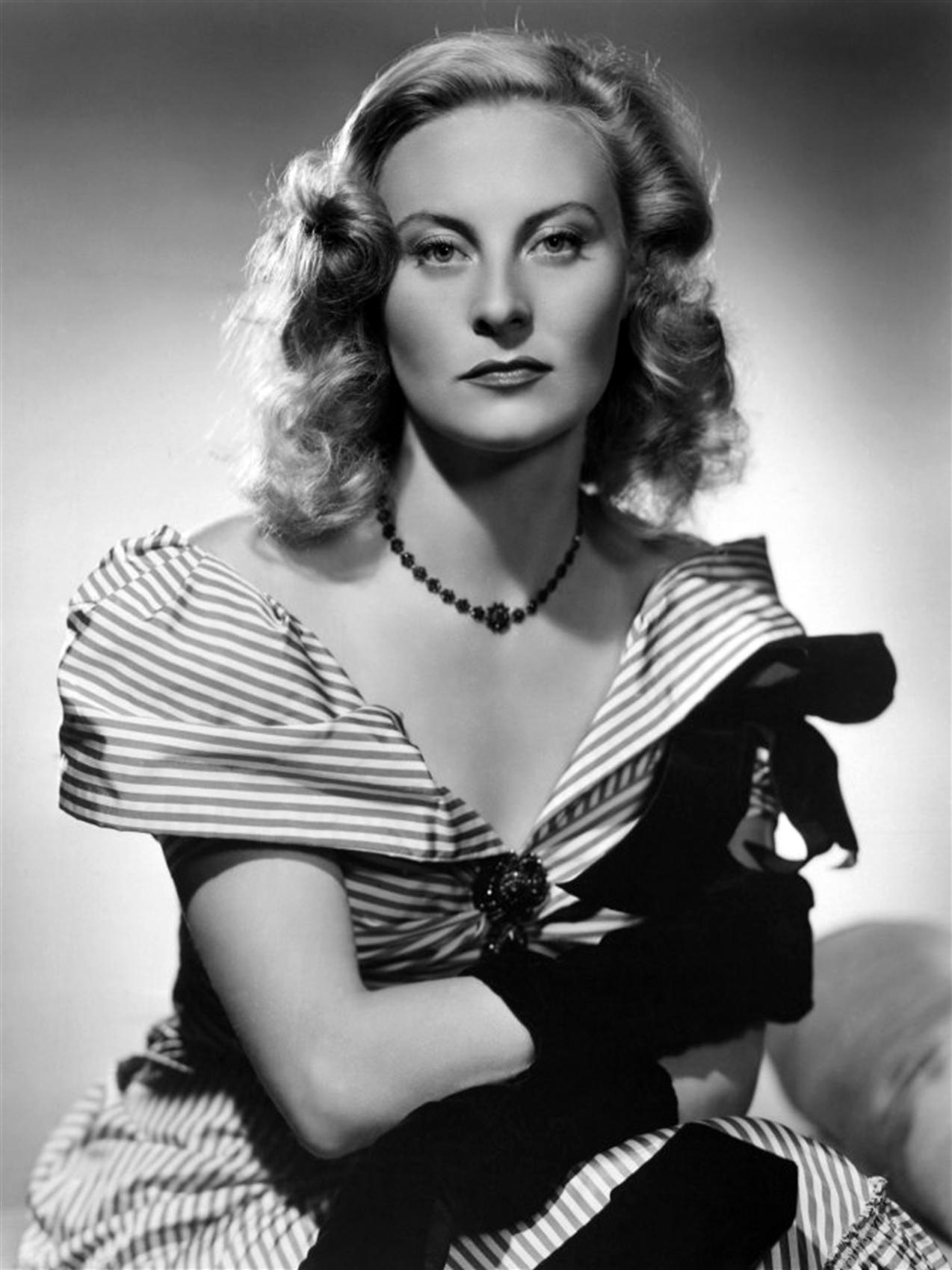
Michèle Morgan was the first recipient for Pastoral Symphony (1946)

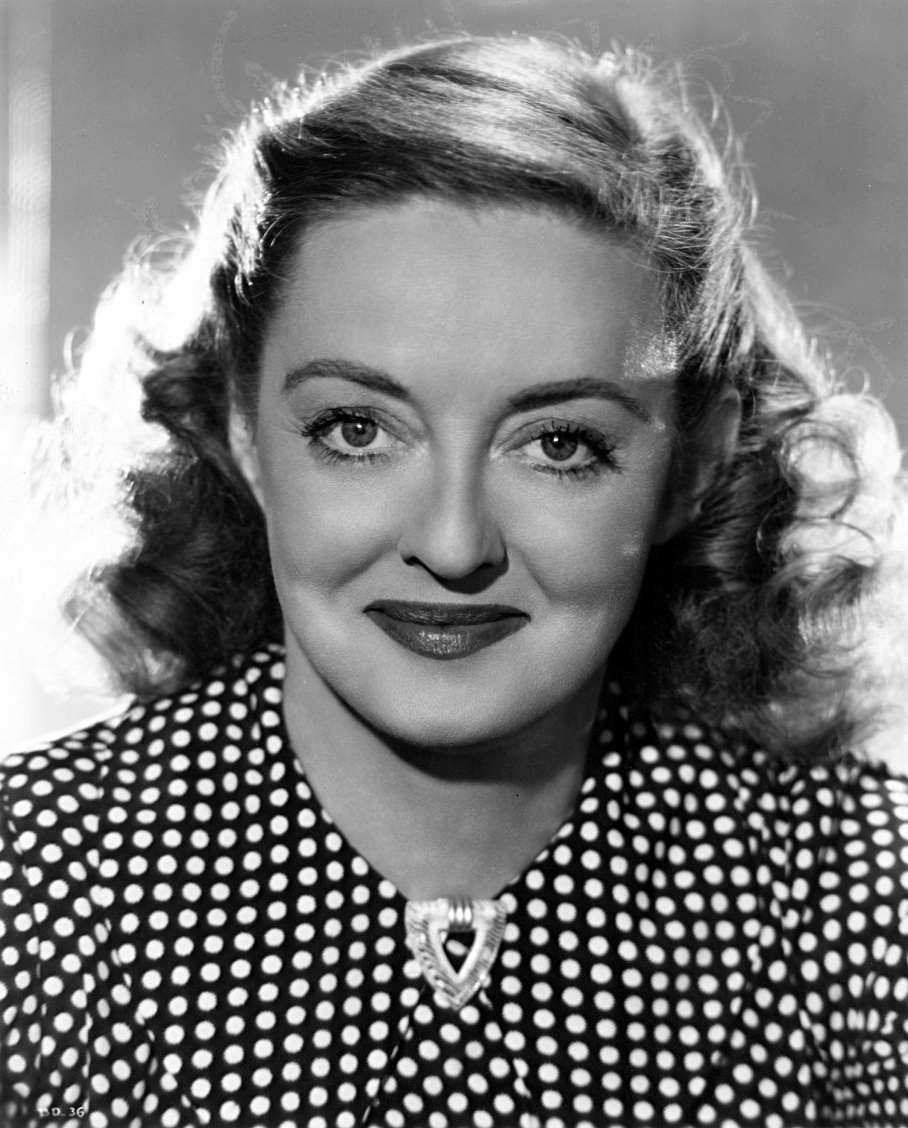
Bette Davis won for All About Eve (1950)

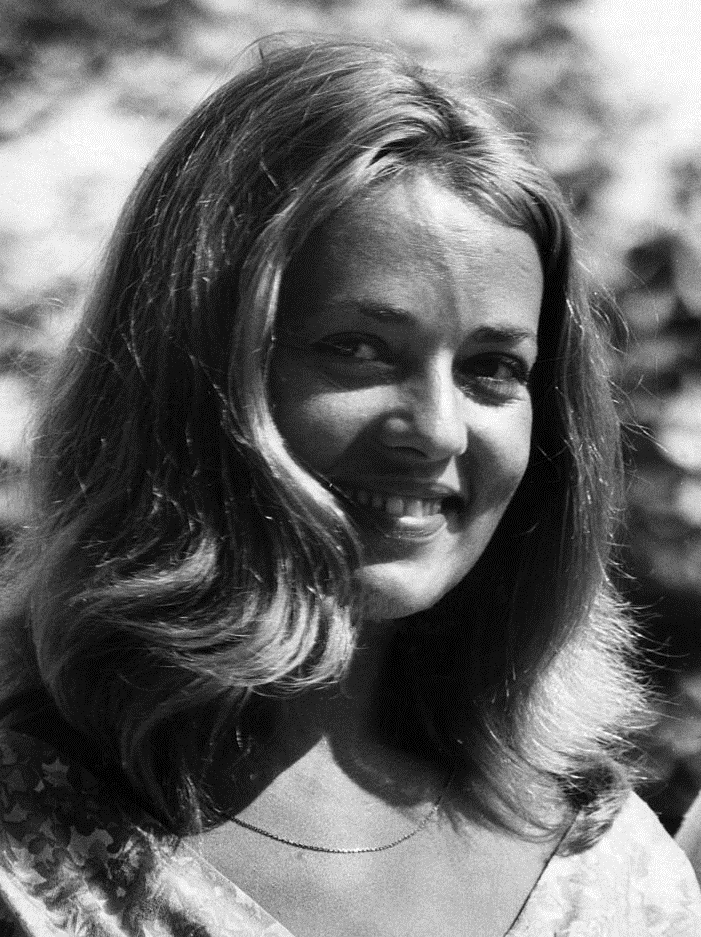
Jeanne Moreau won for Seven Days... Seven Nights (1960)

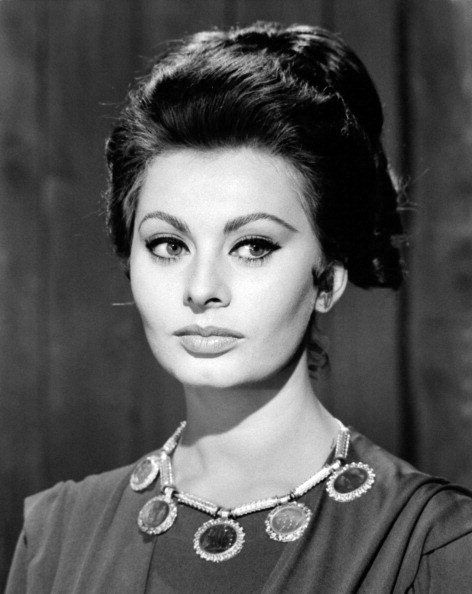
Sophia Loren won for Two Women (1961)

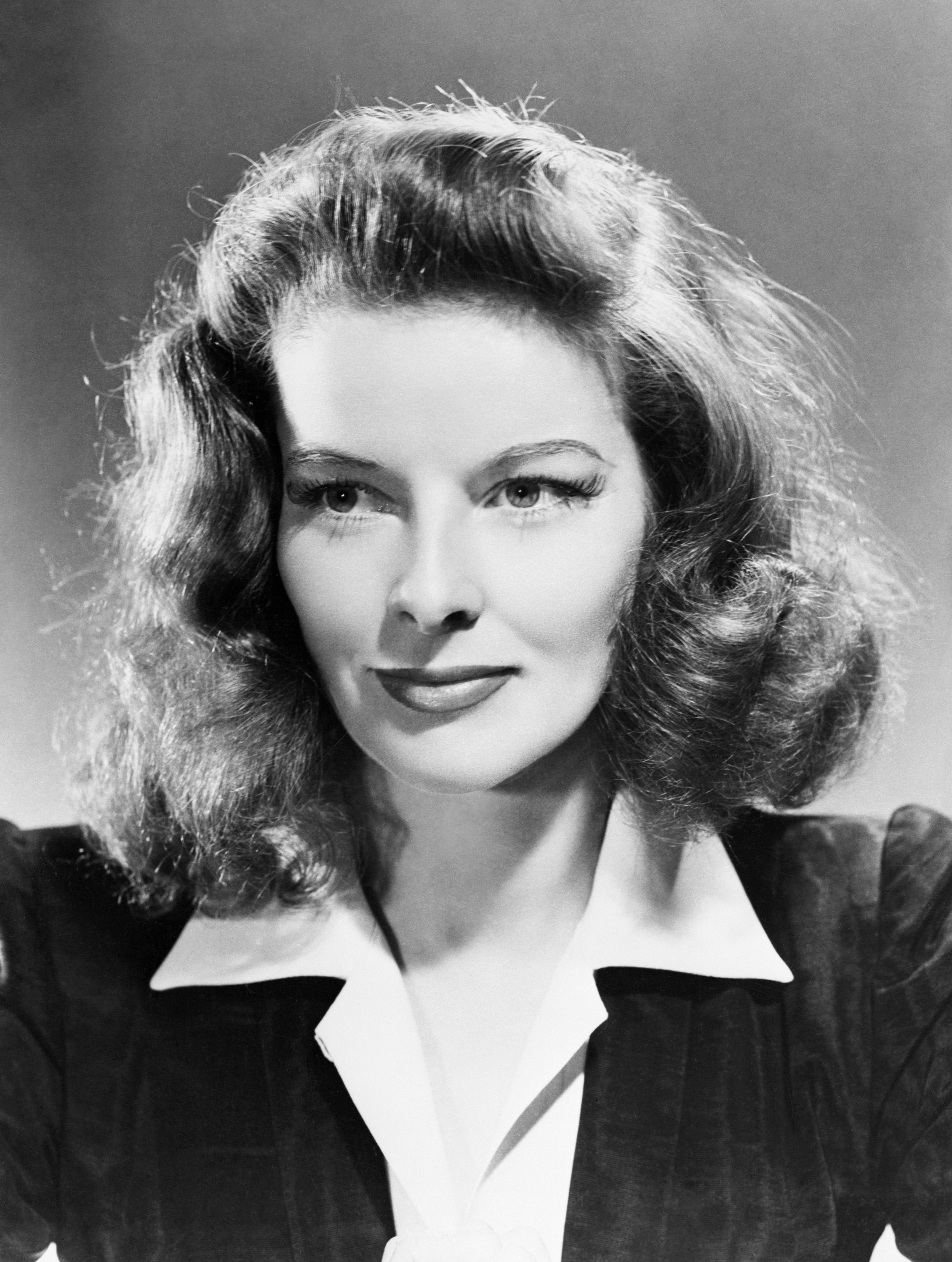
Katharine Hepburn won for Long Day's Journey into Night (1962)

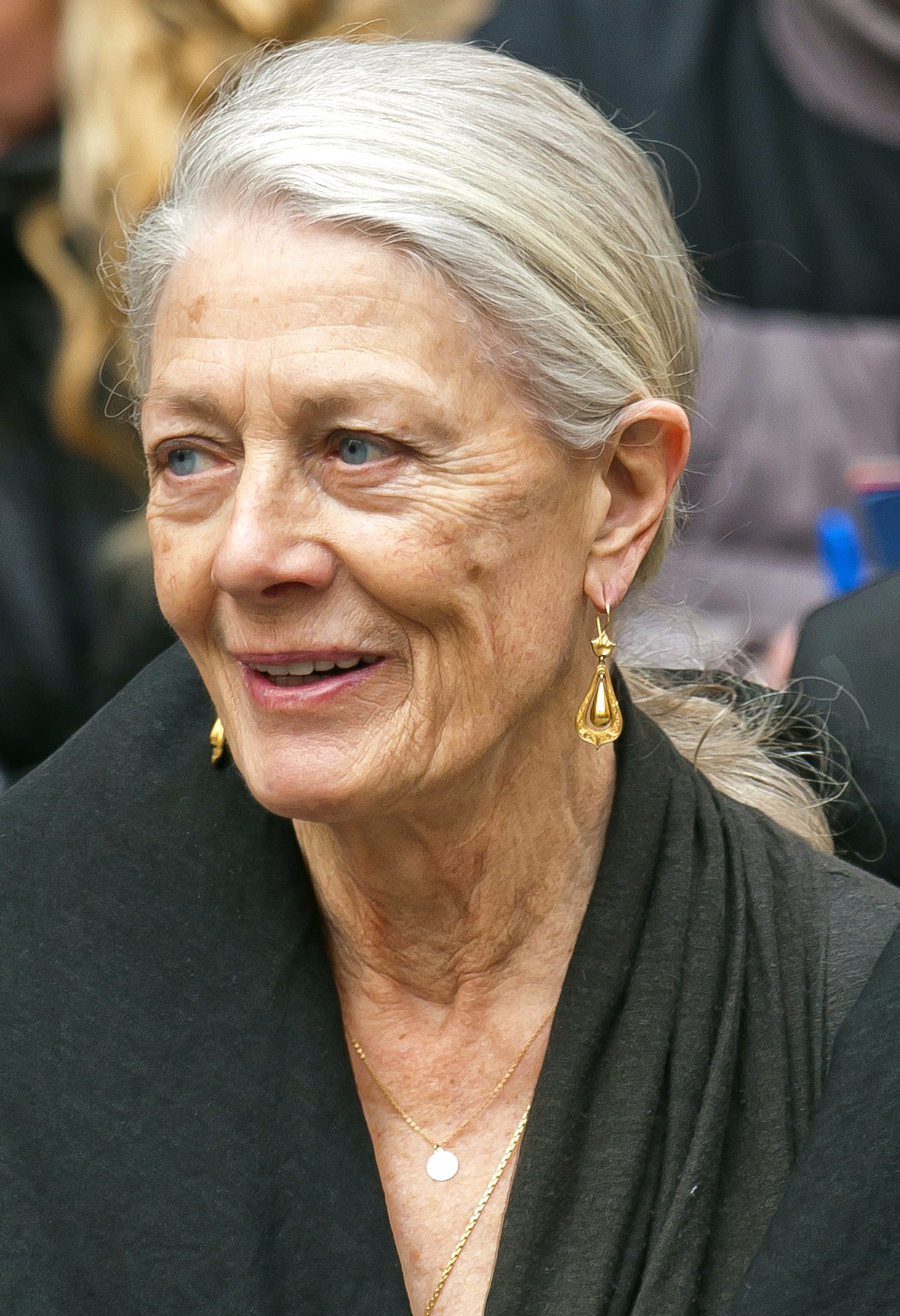
Vanessa Redgrave won twice for Morgan – A Suitable Case for Treatment (1966) and Isadora (1969)

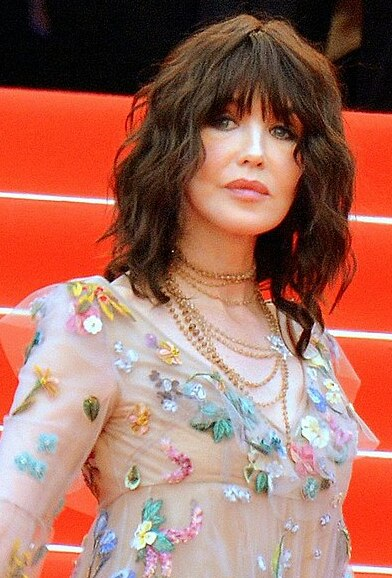
Isabelle Adjani won for two films in the same year, Possession and Quartet in 1981.

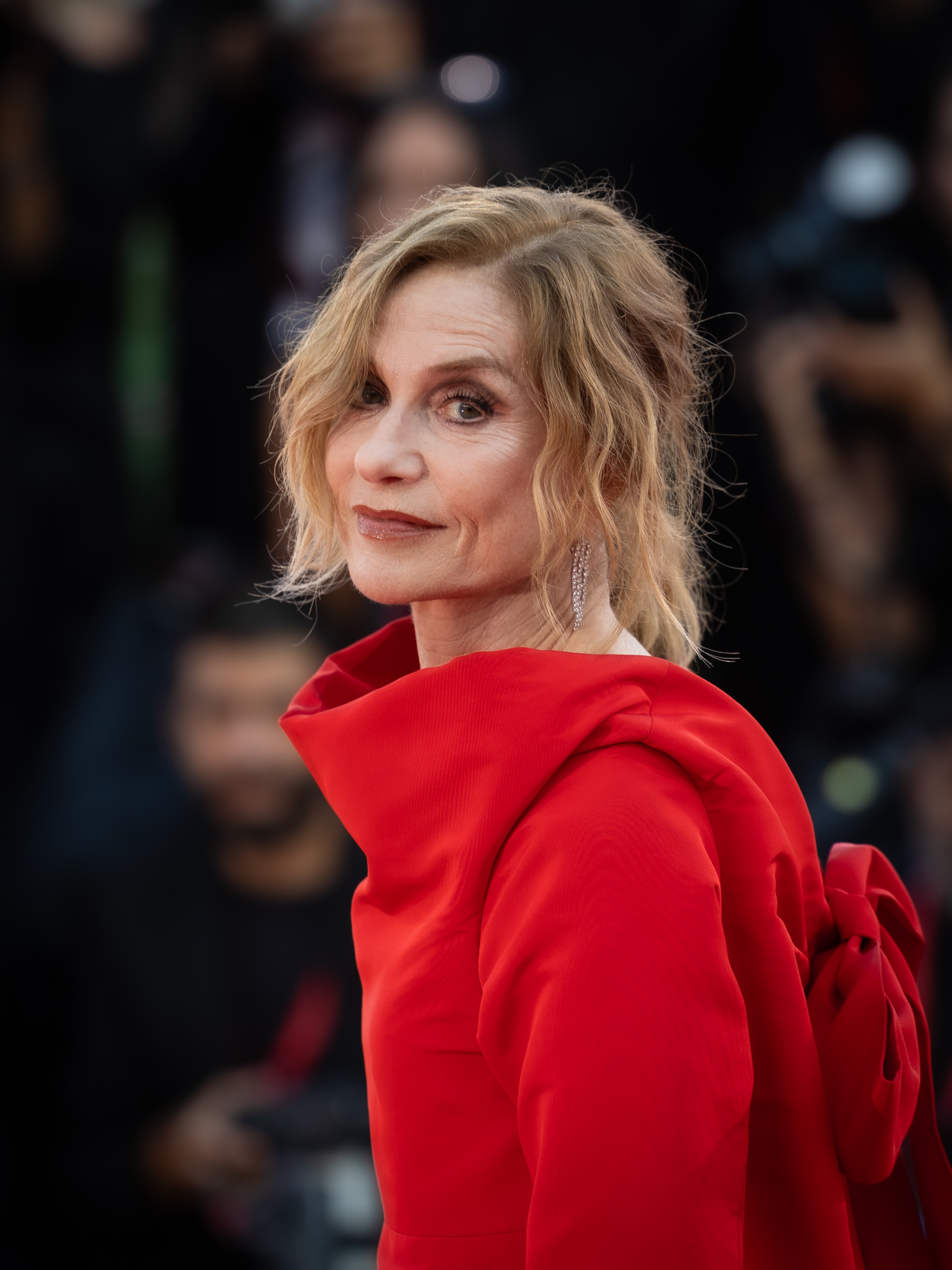
Isabelle Huppert won twice for Violette Nozière (1978) and The Piano Teacher (2001)

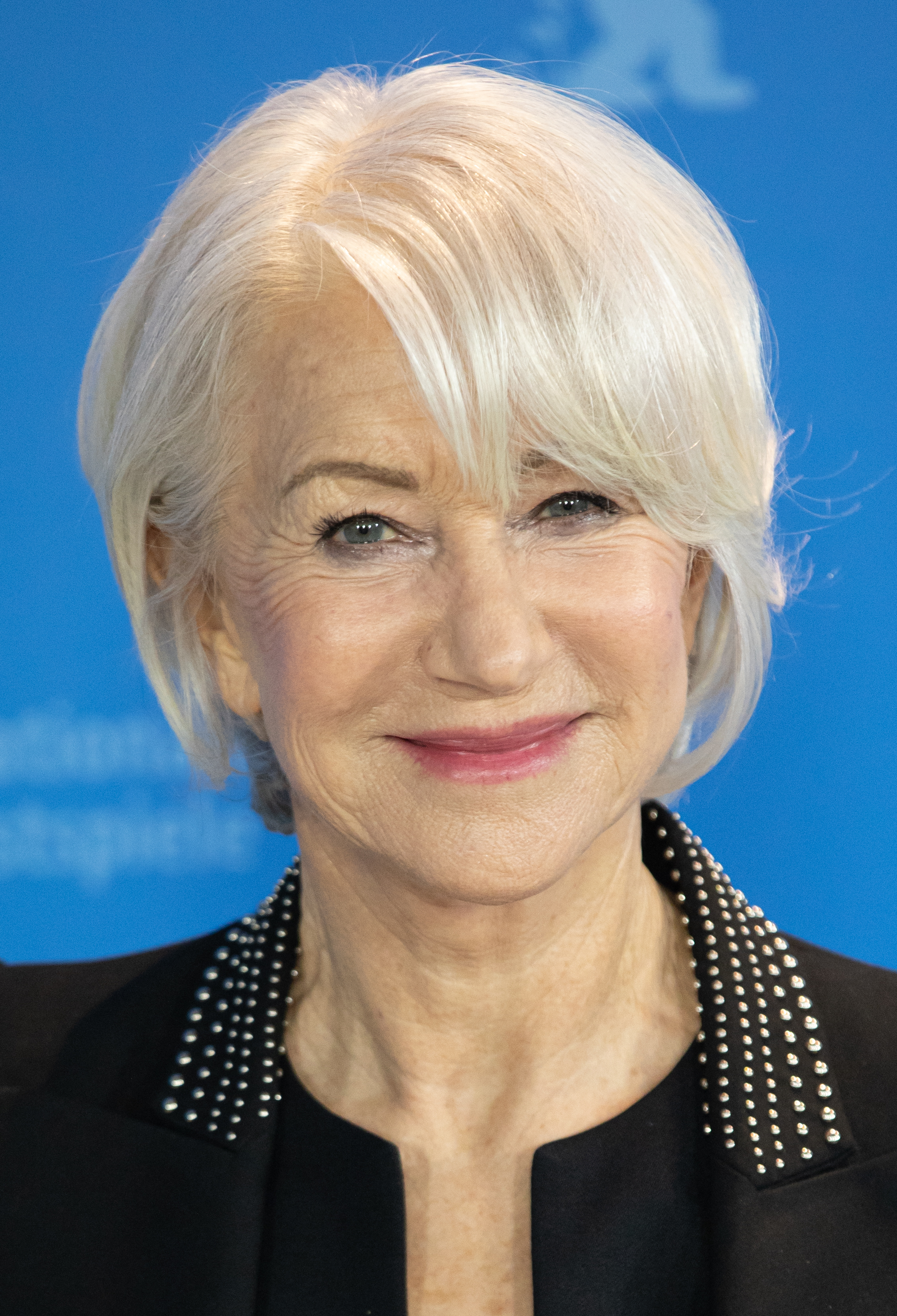
Dame Helen Mirren won twice for Cal (1984) and The Madness of King George (1995)

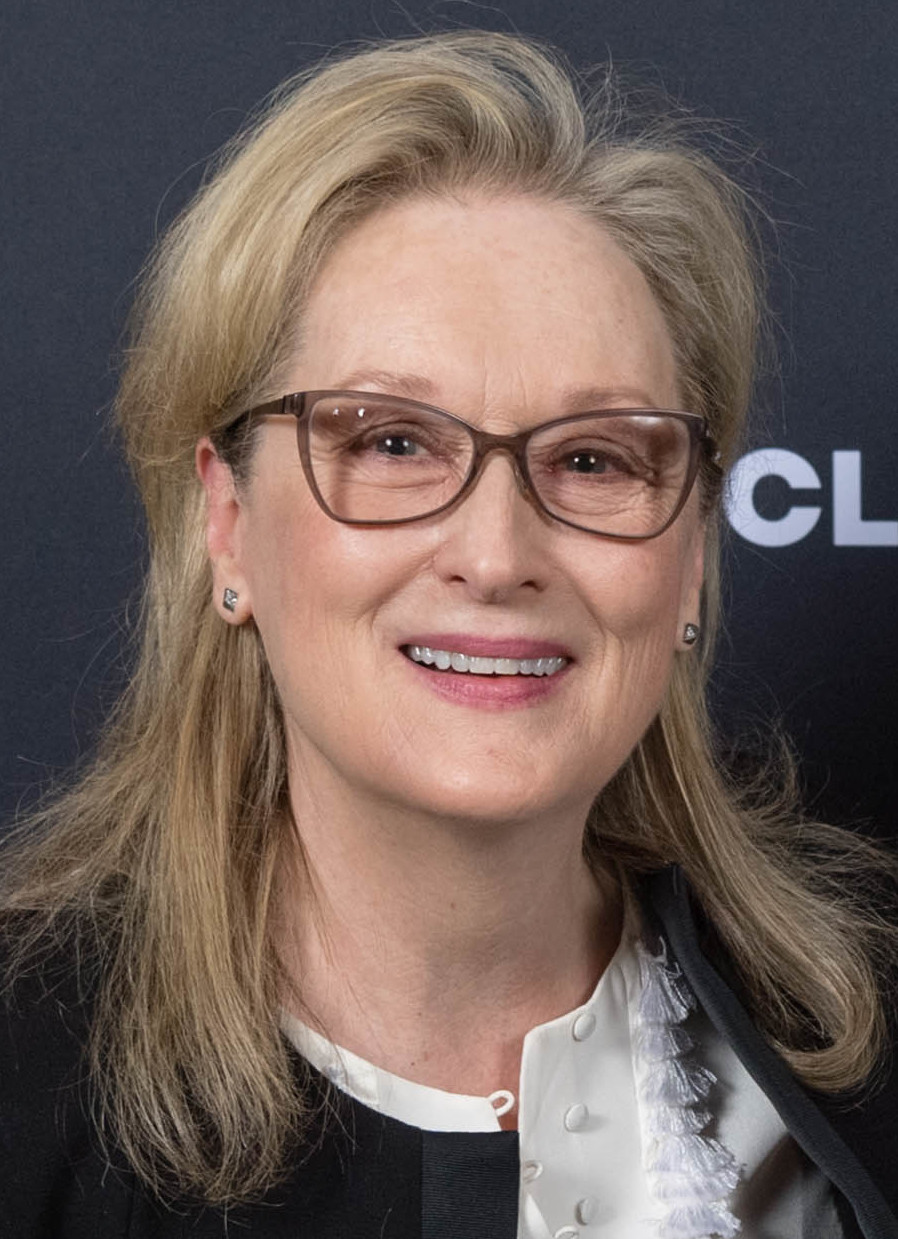
Meryl Streep won for A Cry in the Dark (1989)

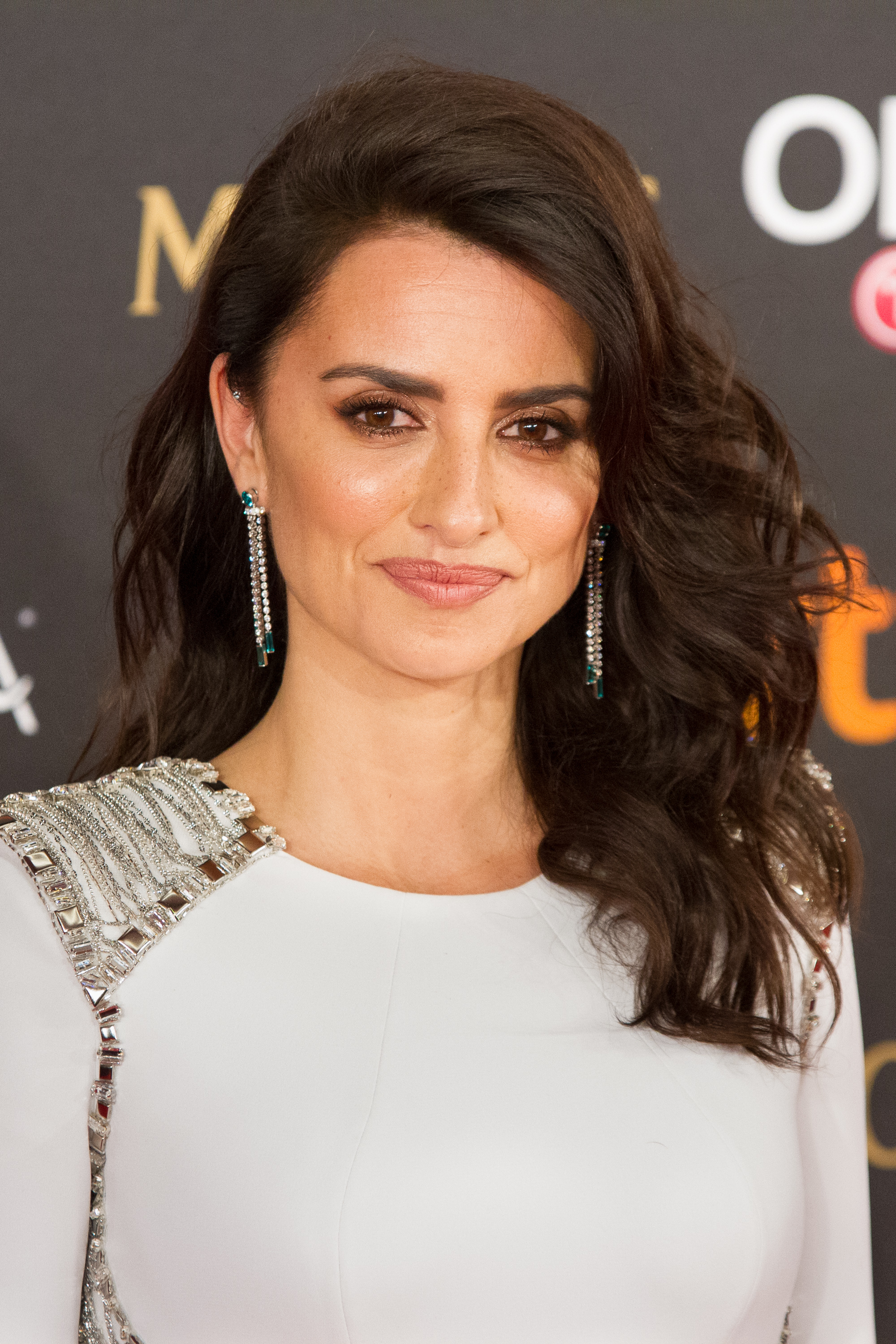
Penélope Cruz won along with five of her castmates for Volver (2006)

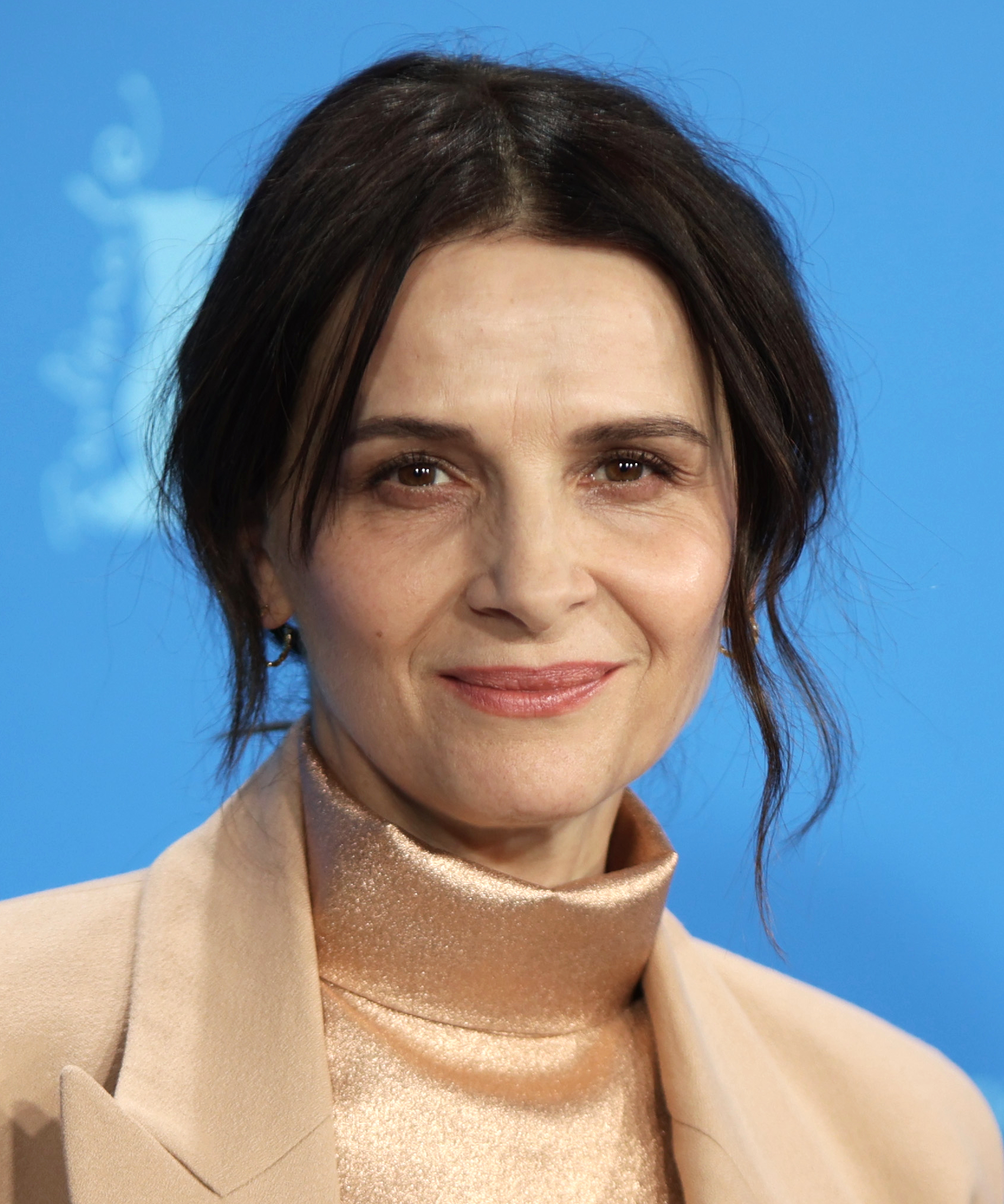
Juliette Binoche won for Certified Copy (2010)

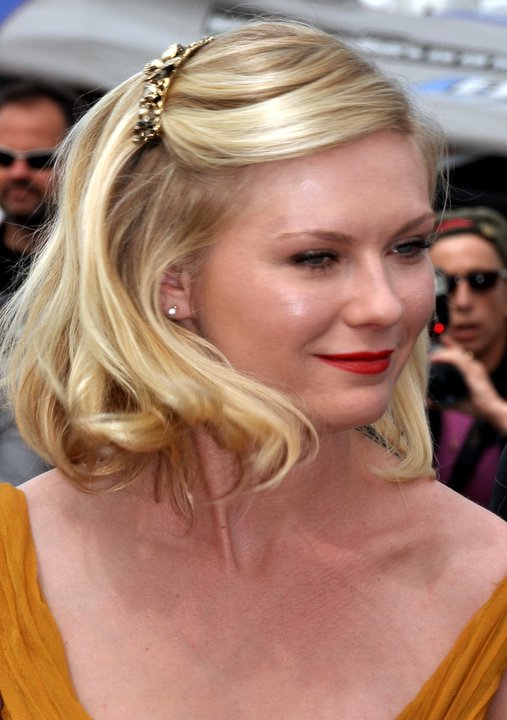
Kirsten Dunst won for Melancholia (2011)

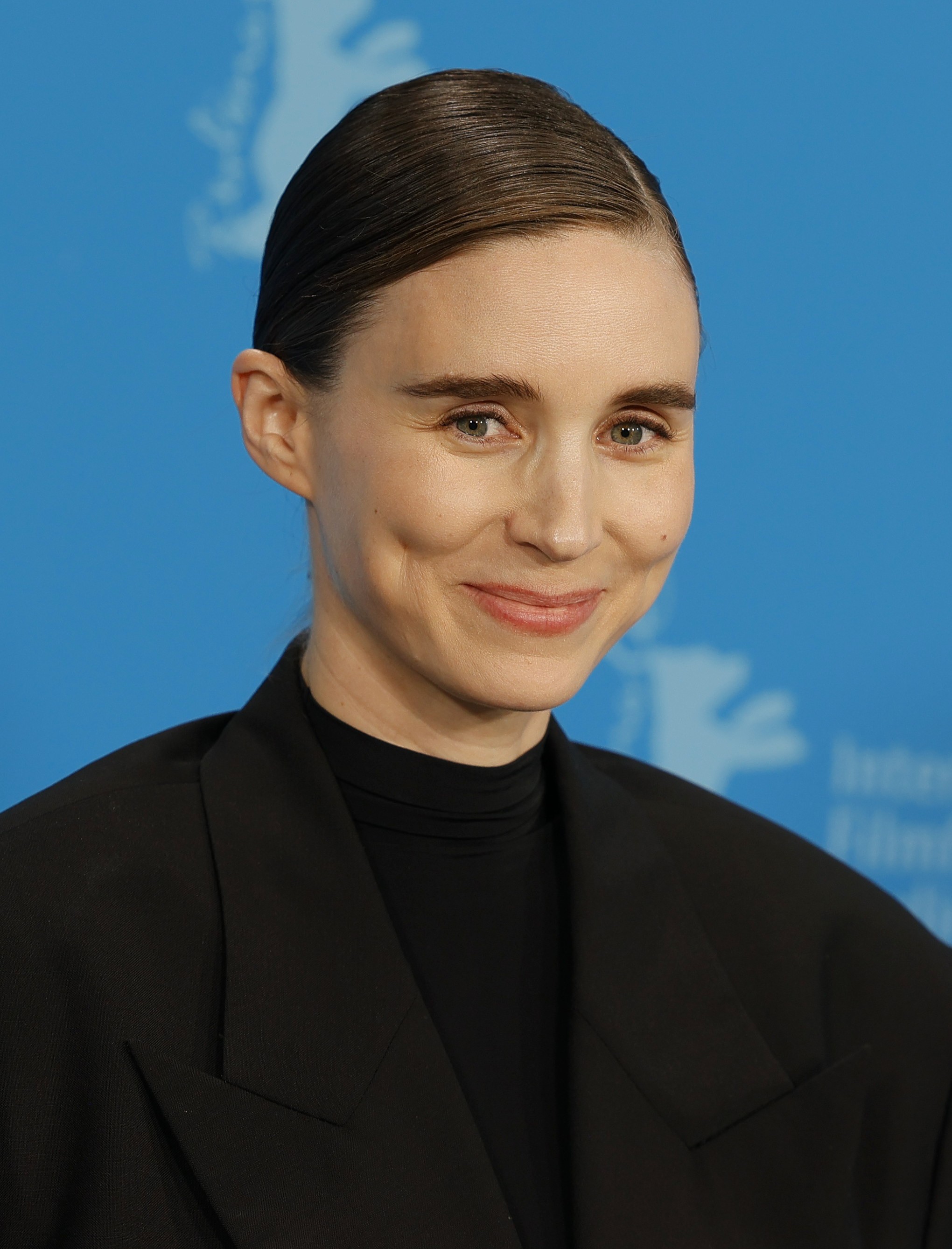
Rooney Mara won for Carol (2015)

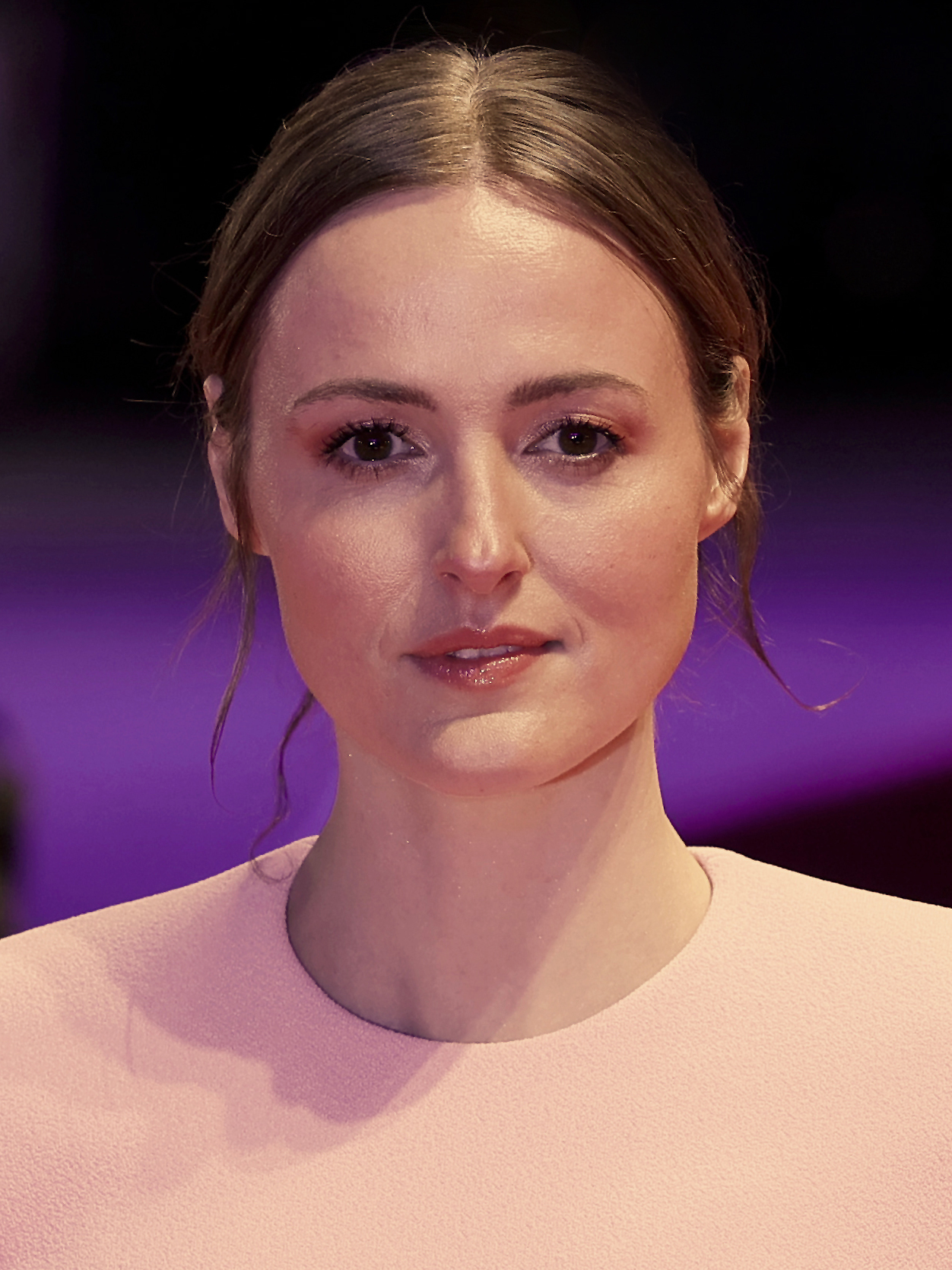
Renate Reinsve won for The Worst Person in the World (2021)

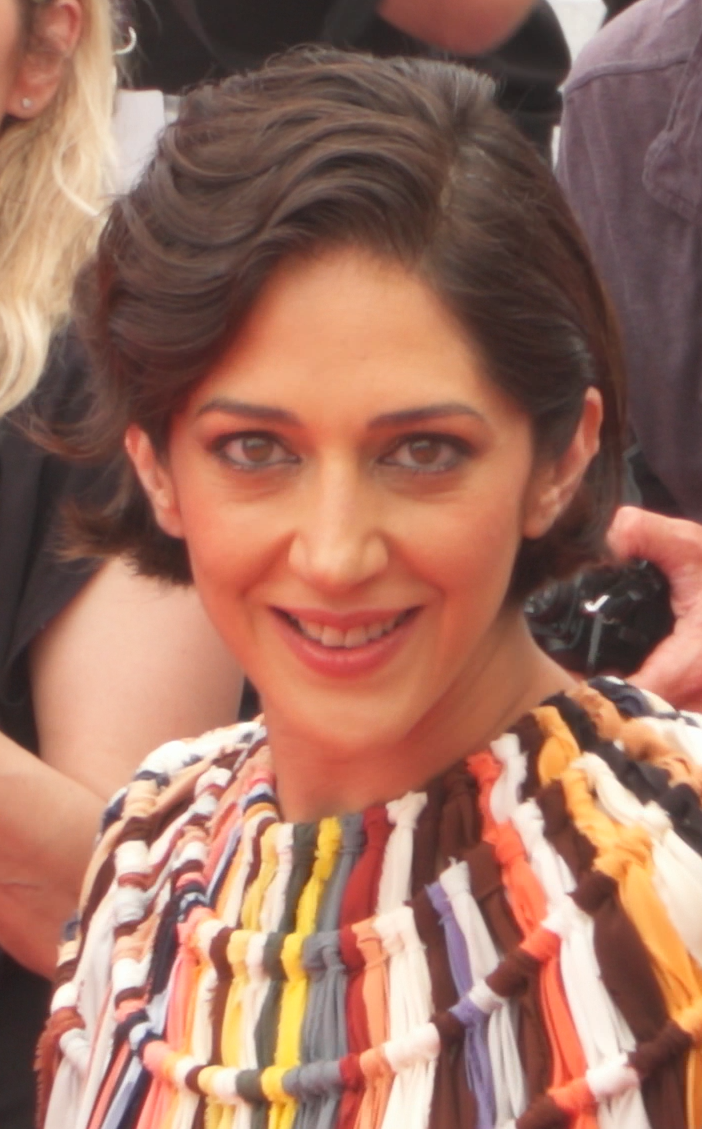
Zar Amir Ebrahimi won for Holy Spider (2023)

Table key
‡	Indicates the Best Supporting Actress winner

=== 1940s ===
Year	Actress	Role(s)	English Title	Original Title	Ref.
1946	Michèle Morgan	Gertrude	Pastoral Symphony	La Symphonie pastorale	
1949	Isa Miranda	Marta Manfredini	The Walls of Malapaga	Au-delà des grilles	

=== 1950s ===
Year	Actress	Role(s)	English Title	Original Title	Ref.
1951	Bette Davis	Margo Channing	All About Eve		
1952	Lee Grant	The Shoplifter	Detective Story		
1955^{[A]} ^{[B]}	Elena Dobronravova	Katya Travnikova	A Big Family	Больша́я семья́	
1955^{[A]} ^{[B]}	Vera Kuznetsova	Agafya Karpovna Zhurbina	A Big Family	Больша́я семья́	
1955^{[A]} ^{[B]}	Klara Luchko	Lida Zhurbina	A Big Family	Больша́я семья́	
1955^{[A]} ^{[B]}	Ekaterina Savinova	Dunyasha Zhurbina	A Big Family	Больша́я семья́	
1955^{[A]} ^{[B]}	Iya Arepina	Tanya Zhurbina	A Big Family	Больша́я семья́	
1955^{[A]} ^{[B]}	Larisa Kronberg	Zina Ivanova	A Big Family	Больша́я семья́	
1956^{[A]}	Susan Hayward	Lillian Roth	I'll Cry Tomorrow		
1957	Giulietta Masina	Maria "Cabiria" Ceccarelli	Nights of Cabiria	Le notti di Cabiria	
1958	Bibi Andersson^{[C]}	Hjördis Petterson	Brink of Life	Nära livet	
1958	Eva Dahlbeck^{[C]}	Stina Andersson	Brink of Life	Nära livet	
1958	Barbro Hiort af Ornäs^{[C]}	Nurse Brita	Brink of Life	Nära livet	
1958	Ingrid Thulin^{[C]}	Cecilia Ellius	Brink of Life	Nära livet	
1959	Simone Signoret	Alice Aisgill	Room at the Top		

=== 1960s ===
Year	Actress	Role(s)	English Title	Original Title	Ref.
1960	Melina Mercouri	Ilya	Never on Sunday	Ποτέ την Κυριακή	
1960	Jeanne Moreau	Anne Desbarèdes	Seven Days... Seven Nights	Moderato cantabile	
1961	Sophia Loren	Cesira	Two Women	La ciociara	
1962	Katharine Hepburn^{[D]}	Mary Cavan Tyrone	Long Day's Journey into Night		
1962	Rita Tushingham^{[D]}	Josephine ("Jo")	A Taste of Honey		
1963	Marina Vlady	Regina	The Conjugal Bed	L'ape regina	
1964	Anne Bancroft	Jo Armitage	The Pumpkin Eater		
1964	Barbara Barrie	Julie Cullen Richards	One Potato, Two Potato		
1965	Samantha Eggar	Miranda Grey	The Collector		
1966	Vanessa Redgrave	Leonie Delt	Morgan – A Suitable Case for Treatment		
1967	Pia Degermark	Elvira Madigan	Elvira Madigan		
1969	Vanessa Redgrave	Isadora Duncan	Isadora		

=== 1970s ===
Year	Actress	Role(s)	English Title	Original Title	Ref.
1970	Ottavia Piccolo	Ersilia	Metello		
1971	Kitty Winn	Helen Reeves	The Panic in Needle Park		
1972	Susannah York	Cathryn	Images		
1973	Joanne Woodward	Beatrice Hunsdorfer	The Effect of Gamma Rays on Man-in-the-Moon Marigolds		
1974	Marie-José Nat	Elle / Michel's wife	Violins at the Ball	Les Violons du bal	
1975	Valérie Perrine	Honey Bruce	Lenny		
1976	Dominique Sanda	Irene Carelli Ferramonti	The Inheritance	L'eredità Ferramonti	
1976	Mari Törőcsik	Déryné	Mrs. Dery Where Are You?	Déryné hol van?	
1977	Shelley Duvall	Mildred "Millie" Lammoreaux	3 Women		
1977	Monique Mercure	Rose-Aimee Martin	J.A. Martin Photographer	J.A. Martin photographe	
1978	Jill Clayburgh	Erica Benton	An Unmarried Woman		
1978	Isabelle Huppert	Violette Nozière	Violette Nozière		
1979	Sally Field	Norma Rae Webster	Norma Rae		
1979	Eva Mattes ‡	Marie	Woyzeck		

=== 1980s ===
Year	Actress	Role(s)	English Title	Original Title	Ref.
1980	Anouk Aimée	Marta Ponticelli	A Leap in the Dark	Salto nel vuoto	
1980	Milena Dravić ‡ #	Kaca	Special Treatment	Посебан третман	
1980	Carla Gravina ‡ #	Carla	La terrazza		
1981	Isabelle Adjani ^{[E]}	Anna / Helen	Possession		
1981	Isabelle Adjani ^{[E]}	Marya 'Mado' Zelli	Quartet		
1981	Elena Solovey ‡	Ona	Faktas	Группа крови „Ноль“	
1982	Jadwiga Jankowska-Cieślak	Eva Szalanczky	Another Way	Egymásra nézve	
1983	Hanna Schygulla	Eugenia	The Story of Piera	Storia di Piera	
1984	Helen Mirren	Marcella	Cal		
1985	Norma Aleandro	Alicia Marnet de Ibáñez	The Official Story	La Historia Oficial	
1985	Cher	Florence "Rusty" Dennis	Mask		
1986	Barbara Sukowa	Rosa Luxemburg	Rosa Luxemburg		
1986	Fernanda Torres	The Woman	Love Me Forever or Never	Eu Sei que Vou Te Amar	
1987	Barbara Hershey	Ruth	Shy People		
1988	Barbara Hershey	Diana Roth	A World Apart		
1988	Jodhi May	Molly Roth	A World Apart		
1988	Linda Mvusi	Elsie	A World Apart		
1989	Meryl Streep	Lindy Chamberlain	A Cry in the Dark		

=== 1990s ===
Year	Actress	Role(s)	English Title	Original Title	Ref.
1990	Krystyna Janda	Antonina 'Tonia' Dziwisz	Interrogation	Przesłuchanie	
1991	Irène Jacob	Weronika / Véronique	The Double Life of Veronique	La double vie de Véronique	
1992	Pernilla August	Anna Åkerblom Bergman	The Best Intentions	Den goda viljan	
1993	Holly Hunter	Ada McGrath	The Piano		
1994	Virna Lisi	Catherine de' Medici	La Reine Margot		
1995	Helen Mirren	Queen Charlotte	The Madness of King George		
1996	Brenda Blethyn	Cynthia Rose Purley	Secrets & Lies		
1997	Kathy Burke	Valerie	Nil by Mouth		
1998	Élodie Bouchez	Isabelle 'Isa' Tostin	The Dreamlife of Angels	La Vie rêvée des anges	
1998	Natacha Régnier	Marie Thomas	The Dreamlife of Angels	La Vie rêvée des anges	
1999	Séverine Caneele	Dominio	Humanité	L'humanité	
1999	Émilie Dequenne	Rosetta	Rosetta		

=== 2000s ===
Year	Actress	Role(s)	English Title	Original Title	Ref.
2000	Björk	Selma Ježková	Dancer in the Dark		
2001	Isabelle Huppert	Erika Kohut	The Piano Teacher	La Pianiste	
2002	Kati Outinen	Irma	The Man Without a Past	Mies vailla menneisyyttä	
2003	Marie-Josée Croze	Nathalie	The Barbarian Invasions	Les Invasions barbares	
2004	Maggie Cheung	Emily Wang	Clean		
2005	Hanna Laslo	Hanna	Free Zone		
2006	Penélope Cruz	Raimunda	Volver		
2006	Carmen Maura	Irene	Volver		
2006	Lola Dueñas	Soledad ("Sole")	Volver		
2006	Blanca Portillo	Agustina	Volver		
2006	Yohana Cobo	Paula	Volver		
2006	Chus Lampreave	Tía Paula	Volver		
2007	Jeon Do-yeon	Lee Shin-ae	Secret Sunshine	밀양	
2008	Sandra Corveloni	Cleuza	Linha de Passe		
2009	Charlotte Gainsbourg	She	Antichrist		

=== 2010s ===
Year	Actress	Role(s)	English Title	Original Title	Ref.
2010	Juliette Binoche	The Woman	Certified Copy	Copie conforme	
2011	Kirsten Dunst	Justine	Melancholia		
2012	Cristina Flutur	Alina	Beyond the Hills	După dealuri	
2012	Cosmina Stratan	Voichita	Beyond the Hills	După dealuri	
2013	Bérénice Bejo	Marie Brisson	The Past	Le passé / گذشته	
2014	Julianne Moore	Havana Segrand	Maps to the Stars		
2015	Emmanuelle Bercot	Marie-Antoinette Jézéquel	Mon Roi		
2015	Rooney Mara	Therese Belivet	Carol		
2016	Jaclyn Jose	Rosa	Ma' Rosa		
2017	Diane Kruger	Katja Sekerci	In the Fade	Aus dem Nichts	
2018	Samal Yeslyamova	Ayka	Ayka	Айка	
2019	Emily Beecham	Alice Woodard	Little Joe		

=== 2020s ===
Year	Actress	Role(s)	English Title	Original Title	Ref.
2021	Renate Reinsve	Julie	The Worst Person in the World	Verdens verste menneske	
2022	Zar Amir Ebrahimi	Arezoo Rahimi	Holy Spider	عنکبوت مقدس	
2023	Merve Dizdar	Nuray	About Dry Grasses	Kuru Otlar Üstüne	
2024	Karla Sofía Gascón	Emilia Perez	Emilia Pérez		
2024	Selena Gomez	Jessi del Monte	Emilia Pérez		
2024	Adriana Paz	Epifanía Flores	Emilia Pérez		
2024	Zoe Saldaña	Rita Mora Castro	Emilia Pérez		
2025	Nadia Melliti	Fatima	The Little Sister	La Petite Dernière	
2026	Tao Okamoto	Mari Morisaki	All of a Sudden	Soudain / 急に具合が悪くなる	
2026	Virginie Efira	Marie-Lou Fontaine	All of a Sudden	Soudain / 急に具合が悪くなる	

== Multiple winners ==
The following individuals have received multiple Best Actress awards:

Number of Wins	Actress	Nationality	Films
2	Barbara Hershey	United States	Shy People (1987) and A World Apart (1988)
2	Helen Mirren	United Kingdom	Cal (1984) and The Madness of King George (1995)
2	Isabelle Huppert	France	Violette Nozière (1978) and The Piano Teacher (2001)
2	Isabelle Adjani	France	Possession (1981) and Quartet (1981) [The only actress to win for two different movies on the same year]
2	Vanessa Redgrave	United Kingdom	Morgan – A Suitable Case for Treatment (1966) and Isadora (1969)

== See also ==
The following individuals have also received Best Actress award(s) at Venice or Berlin Film Festival.

Winning Year at Cannes	Actress	Festival	Year	English Title	Nationality
1951	Bette Davis	Venice	1937	Kid Galahad and Marked Woman	United States
1958	Bibi Andersson	Berlin	1963	The Mistress	Sweden
1959	Simone Signoret	Berlin	1971	Le Chat	France
1961	Sophia Loren	Venice	1958	The Black Orchid	Italy
1962	Katharine Hepburn	Venice	1934	Little Women	United States
1966 1969	Vanessa Redgrave	Venice ‡	1994	Little Odessa	England
1978 2001	Isabelle Huppert	Venice	1988	Story of Women	France
1978 2001	Isabelle Huppert	Venice	1995	La Cérémonie	France
1981	Isabelle Adjani	Berlin	1989	Camille Claudel	France
1983	Hanna Schygulla	Berlin	1979	The Marriage of Maria Braun	Germany
1984 1995	Helen Mirren	Venice	2006	The Queen	England
1986	Barbara Sukowa	Venice	1981	Marianne and Juliane	Germany
1989	Meryl Streep	Berlin #	2003	The Hours	United States
1993	Holly Hunter	Berlin	1988	Broadcast News	United States
2004	Maggie Cheung	Berlin	1992	Center Stage	Hong Kong
2006	Penélope Cruz	Venice	2021	Parallel Mothers	Spain
2010	Juliette Binoche	Venice	1993	Three Colours: Blue	France
2010	Juliette Binoche	Berlin	1997	The English Patient	France
2014	Julianne Moore	Venice	2002	Far from Heaven	United States
2014	Julianne Moore	Berlin #	2003	The Hours	United States

== Notes ==
A: This year the award was changed to Prix d'Interpretation (Acting Award), without gender differentiation.
B: The entire male and female cast of A Big Family (Больша́я семья́) was recipient of this award in a tie with Spencer Tracy for Bad Day at Black Rock.
C: This year award was given as Prix collectif d'interprétation féminine Un Certain Regard (Collective Female Acting Award – Un Certain Regard) to the female cast of Brink of Life (Nära livet).
D: This year award was given as Prix Le Premier Regard Un Certain Regard (Premiere Award – Un Certain Regard) to the lead male and female cast of Long Day's Journey into Night and A Taste of Honey (ex aequo).
E: Performer to receive a joint award which honor the outstanding work in multiple different films in the same official competition slate.
