= Linda Mvusi =

Actress and architect

- Born: 1955 (age 70–71); Bloemfontein
- Occupations: Actress and architect
- Notable work: A World Apart
- Awards: Best Actress at the 1988 Cannes Film Festival

Linda Mvusi (c. 1955) is a South African actress and architect. In 1988, Mvusi made her acting debut in the film A World Apart (1988), for which she won the Best Actress Award at the 1988 Cannes Film Festival, becoming the first Black woman and the first South African to win the Best Actress award at Cannes. In 2004, Mvusi shared an award for excellence for her architecture on the Apartheid Museum.

== Biography ==
Linda Mvusi was born in the Free State of South Africa around 1955 and brought up in Northern Rhodesia, Ghana and Kenya.

She trained as an architect and was practising her craft in Harare when she met Chris Menges who was trying to find locations for his film, A World Apart, near Bulawayo. Mvusi was initially wary of this film as she suspected it was a film made by outsiders with foreign money for a foreign audience. Mvusi felt that the millions of foreign money was preventing Africans from telling their own story. She said "white film makers [are] suppressing our own growth, our own view of history [and] our own reality". However Menges impressed her when he began to cast locals and ANC members into the cast.

The film was based on an autobiographical play by Shawn Slovo. The film tells the story of thirteen-year-old Shawn Slovo, the daughter of Joe Slovo and Ruth First. The film explores the relationship between the daughter and her white mother. The mother is committed to the fight against the political oppression in South Africa, but the pressure of the family and politics collide and bring about the family's break-up. It is set at the time of the apartheid regime in South Africa. Joe Slovo was then the head of the communist party in South Africa. In the film the names of the parents are changed to Gus and Diana Roth and their daughter is renamed Molly.

In real life and in the film they employed a maid to care for their child. This person, Elsie, was played by Mvusi in the film.

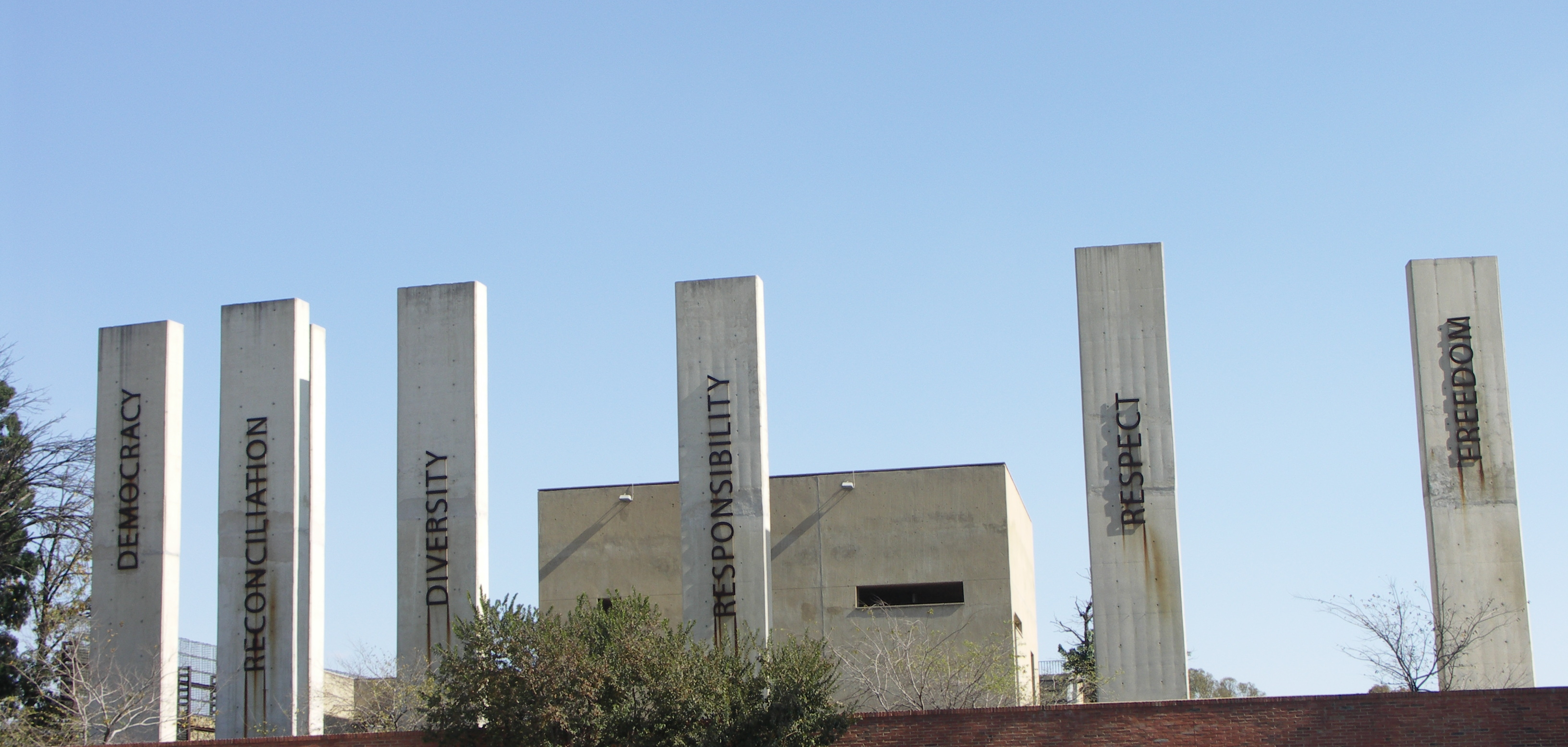
The Apartheid Museum which Mvusi worked on

Menges said he preferred to work with non-professional actors like Mvusi and Jodhi May (she played Molly in the film). This view may have reflected however the poor relationship between Menges and Barbara Hershey, who played the leading role of the mother. Mvusi reported that there were many arguments during the making of the film. Much of the tension was due to not wanting to lose the "black story", but Mvusi felt the arguments were worth it as the film was true to its message. She credits Menges with ensuring that they "are extremely sympathetic, because they are true." The film was dedicated to Ruth First who was killed by a parcel bomb sent by the South African Police in 1982.

At the 1988 Cannes Film Festival, Mvusi shared the Best Actress Award with her co-stars in A World Apart, becoming the first Black woman and the first South African to win the Best Actress award at Cannes.

== Architecture ==
Her performance was thought creditable by Newsweek magazine. Mvusi returned to her profession as an architect and practices with her own company in South Africa. She has worked on the Apartheid Museum in Johannesburg. where she has been named in an award for excellence by the South African Institute of Architects. In 2004, Mvusi was working on an urban village called Fort West in Tshwane.

== Filmography ==
- 1988: A World Apart as Elsie

== Honours ==
- 1988 Cannes Film Festival

Best Actress Award for A World Apart (shared)

- South African Institute of Architects

2004 Award for Excellence for the Apartheid Museum in Johannesburg (shared)
