= Jodhi May =

British actress (born 1975)

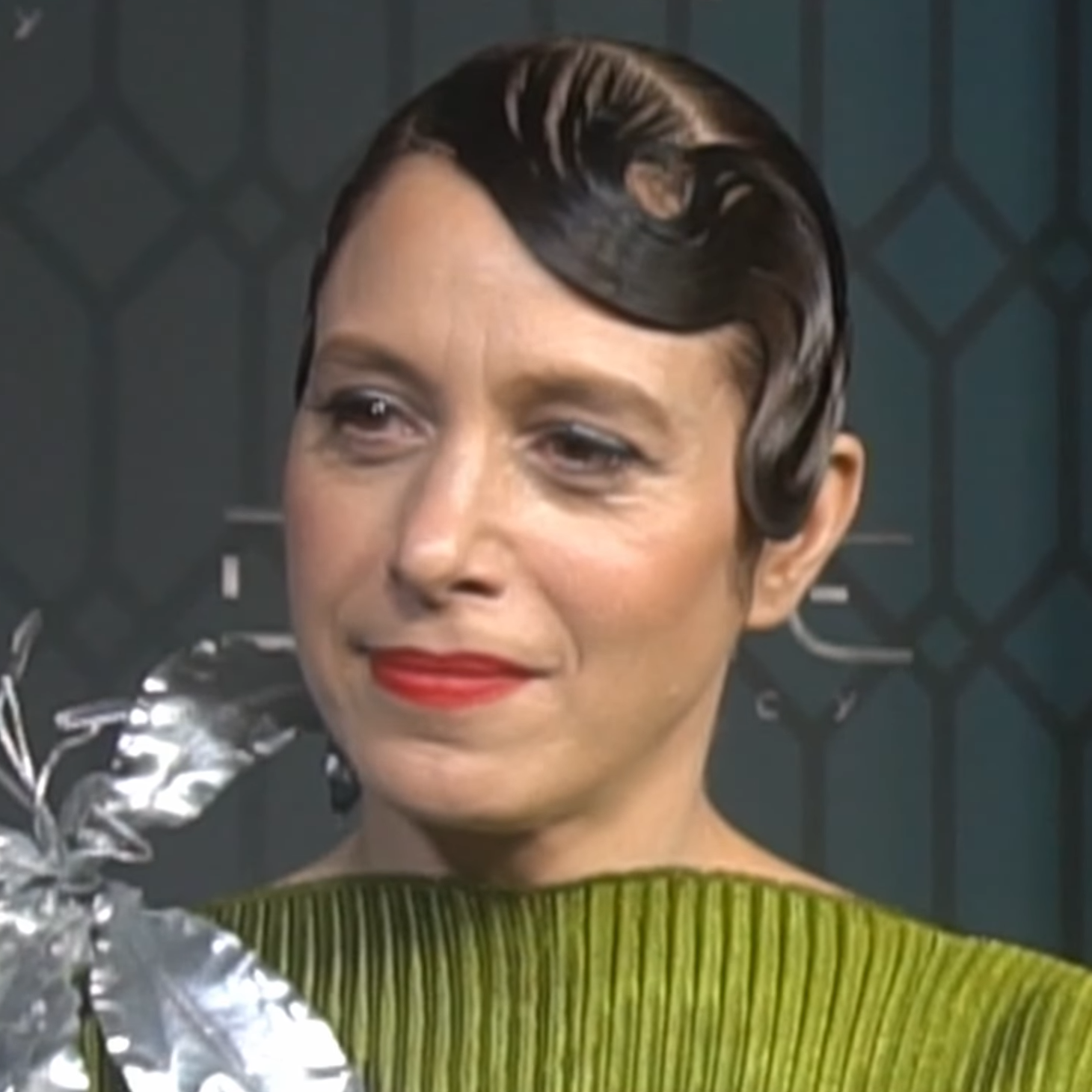
- May in 2024
- Born: May 8, 1975 (age 51); Camden Town, London, England
- Education: Wadham College, Oxford
- Occupation: Actress
- Years active: 1988–present

Jodhi May (born 8 May 1975) is an English actress. Starting her career as a child actress, she is the youngest recipient of the Cannes Film Festival Award for Best Actress, for A World Apart (1988), which she won at 12 years old.

Her other credits include The Last of the Mohicans (1992), Sister My Sister (1994), Aristocrats (1999), Tipping the Velvet (2002), the television adaptation of The Other Boleyn Girl (2003), The Amazing Mrs Pritchard (2006), The Jury II and I, Anna (2011), A Quiet Passion (2016), Genius (2017), Moving On (2018), Gentleman Jack (2019), The Warrior Queen of Jhansi (2019), and The Witcher (2019).

== Early life ==
May was born on 8 May 1975 to a French-Turkish mother who was an art teacher and a German father. Film producer Alain Poiré was her godfather and she credits him for inspiring her passion for film while growing up.

May was educated at Camden School for Girls. She started her acting career at 12 years old and later studied English at Wadham College, Oxford.

== Career ==
Casting director Susie Figgis discovered May when she was a school in Camden. May first acted at the age of 12, in A World Apart (1988). For the role she received a Best Actress award at the 1988 Cannes Film Festival, shared with her co-stars Barbara Hershey and Linda Mvusi.

Other roles have included Alice Munro in Michael Mann's The Last of the Mohicans, Lea Papin in Sister My Sister, Lady Sarah Lennox in Aristocrats, Florence Banner in Tipping the Velvet. Anne Boleyn in the first adaptation of The Other Boleyn Girl (2003). May played Janet Stone in the 2011 noir thriller I, Anna, alongside Gabriel Byrne, Charlotte Rampling, Eddie Marsan, and Honor Blackman.

In 2018, as a writer, she contributed and appeared in the TV series Moving On. In 2019, she played Queen Calanthe in The Witcher, Netflix's live-action adaptation of Andrzej Sapkowski's book series.

In 2020, alongside Valentina Cervi, Francesco Scianna, Filippo Timi, she was in the cast of Marco Simon Puccioni's film The Invisible Thread, produced by Netflix, released in 2022.

== Filmography ==
Year	Film	Role	Notes
1988	A World Apart	Molly Roth	Cannes Film Festival Award for Best Actress; Evening Standard British Film Award for Most Promising Newcomer
1990	Max and Helen	Miriam Weiss	TV film
1990	The Gift	Sonia Parsons	Miniseries
1990	Eminent Domain	Ewa	
1991	For the Greater Good	Rose Kellner	TV film
1992	The Last of the Mohicans	Alice Munro	
1994	Second Best	Alice	
1994	Sister My Sister	Lea	Valladolid International Film Festival Award for Best Actress
1995	Signs and Wonders	Claire Palmore	Main cast
1995	The Scarlet Letter	Pearl	Voice role
1997	The Gambler	Anna Snitkina	Silver Dolphin Award for Best Actress
1997	The Woodlanders	Marty South	
1999	Aristocrats	Lady Sarah Lennox	Miniseries
1999	Warriors	Emma	TV film
1999	The Turn of the Screw	The Governess	TV film
2000	The House of Mirth	Grace Julia Stepney	
2001	Dish	Mo	Short film
2001	Round About Five	Bicycle Courier	Short film
2002	Tipping the Velvet	Florence Banner	Miniseries; 2 episodes
2002	The Escapist	Christine	
2002	Daniel Deronda	Mirah Lapidoth	TV film
2003	The Other Boleyn Girl	Anne Boleyn	TV film
2003	The Mayor of Casterbridge	Elizabeth Jane	TV film
2004	Blinded	Rachel Black	
2005	On a Clear Day	Angela	
2005	Bye Bye Blackbird	Nina	
2005	Friends and Crocodiles	Lizzie Thomas	TV film
2005	The Best Man	Tania	
2005	The Man-Eating Leopard of Rudraprayag	Jean Ibbotson	TV film
2006	Land of the Blind	Joe's Mother	Uncredited
2006	The Amazing Mrs Pritchard	Miranda Lennox	Main cast
2007	Nightwatching	Geertje	
2007	The Street	Jean Lefferty	1 episode
2008	Flashbacks of a Fool	Evelyn Adams	
2008	Einstein and Eddington	Elsa Einstein	TV film
2008	Defiance	Tamara Skidelsky	
2009	Emma	Anne Taylor	Miniseries
2009	Sleep With Me	Lelia	TV film
2010	Blood and Oil	Claire Unwin	TV film
2010	Strike Back	Layla Thompson	Main cast (series 1)
2011	The Jury II	Katherine Bulmore	Main cast (series 2)
2011	I, Anna	Janet Stone	
2012	Ginger & Rosa	Anoushka	
2012	The Scapegoat	Blanche	
2013	The Ice Cream Girls	Poppy Carlisle	
2014	The Crimson Field	Adelinde Crecy	1 episode
2014	Common	Coleen O'Shea	
2015	Game of Thrones	Maggy the Frog	Episode: "The Wars to Come"
2015	A.D. The Bible Continues	Leah, wife of Caiaphas	Main cast
2015	Crossing Lines	Evelyn St. Clair	Episode: "Lost and Found"
2016	A Quiet Passion	Susan Gilbert	
2017	Let Me Go	Beth	Best Ensemble (Jury Award)
2017	Genius	Helen Dukas	2 episodes
2018	Scarborough	Liz	
2018	Down a Dark Hall	Heather Sinclair	
2018	Moving On	Rachel	Episode: "Invisible"
2019	Gentleman Jack	Vere Hobart	4 episodes
2019	The Warrior Queen of Jhansi	Queen Victoria	
2019	The Witcher	Queen Calanthe	
2020	Small Axe	Selma James	Miniseries; 1 episode
2022	The Silent Twins	Marjorie Wallace	
2022	The Invisible Thread	Tilly Nolan	
2022	Prizefighter: The Life of Jem Belcher	Mary Belcher	
2022	The Confessions of Frannie Langton	Hep Elliot	Miniseries
2023	Transatlantic	Peggy Guggenheim	Miniseries; 1 episode
2024	Renegade Nell	Queen Anne	
2024	Dune: Prophecy	Empress Natalya	Main cast

== Awards and nominations ==
Year	Organization	Category	Work	Result	Ref.
1988	Cannes Film Festival	Best Actress	A World Apart	Won	
1988	Evening Standard British Film Awards	Most Promising Newcomer	A World Apart	Won	
1994	Valladolid International Film Festival	Best Female Performance	Sister My Sister	Won	
1998	Festroia - Troia International Film Festival	Best Actress	The Gambler	Won	
2013	Women Film Critics Circle	Women's Work/Best Ensemble	Ginger & Rosa	Won	
