= Slaves in Their Bonds =

Slaves in Their Bonds may refer to:

- Slaves in Their Bonds (novel), by Konstantinos Theotokis
- Slaves in Their Bonds (film), based on the novel
