= Electra (1962 film) =

- Film poster
- Directed by: Michael Cacoyannis
- Written by: Michael Cacoyannis
- Based on: Electra; 413 B.C. by Euripides
- Produced by: Michael Cacoyannis
- Starring: Irene Papas; Giannis Fertis; Aleka Katselli; Manos Katrakis; Notis Peryalis; Fivos Razi; Takis Emmanuel; Theano Ioannidou; Malaina Anousaki; Theodoros Dimitriou; Theodore Demetriou; Elsie Pittas; Petros Ampelas; Kitty Arseni; Thodoros Exarhos; Elli Fotiou; Afroditi Grigoriadou; Kostas Kazakos
- Cinematography: Walter Lassally
- Edited by: Leonidas Antonakis
- Music by: Mikis Theodorakis
- Production company: Finos Film
- Distributed by: Lopert Pictures Corporation (USA); United Artists (internationally [Finland, Denmark, Sweden, Argentina, Mexico])
- Release date: May 25, 1962 (Greece)
- Running time: 113 minutes
- Country: Greece
- Language: Greek

Electra (Greek: Ηλέκτρα Ilektra) is a 1962 Greek film based on the play Electra, written by Euripides. It was directed by Michael Cacoyannis, serving as the first installment of his "Greek tragedy" trilogy, followed by The Trojan Women in 1971 and Iphigenia in 1977. The film starred Irene Papas in the lead role as Elektra and Giannis Fertis as Orestis.

== Plot ==
King Agamemnon is murdered by his wife Clytemnestra and her lover, Agamemnon's cousin and childhood playmate, Aegisthus. Of Agamemnon and Clytemnestra's children, Orestes goes into exile for safety, while Electra is confined to the palace for some years and then forced to marry a peasant to disgrace her and any children.

Some years later, Electra seeks revenge with the help of her brother Orestes and their cousin Pylades. Orestes and Pylades attend a festival to Bacchus hosted by Aegisthus. When Aegisthus challenges Orestes to a mock knife fight, Orestes uses the opportunity to kill him. Electra invites Clytemnestra to her house under false pretenses. Despite Clytemnestra explaining her reasons for killing her husband and apologising for her actions towards Electra, Electra enables Orestes to stab Clytemnestra to death. In the end, the siblings feel remorseful and realise that they will be social outcasts for their actions. They depart in different directions.

== Cast ==
- Irene Papas as Elektra
- Giannis Fertis as Orestes
- Aleka Katselli as Klytaemnistra
- Manos Katrakis as the tutor
- Notis Peryalis as Elektra's husband
- Fivos Razi as Aegisthus
- Takis Emmanuel as Pylades
- Theano Ioannidou as chorus leader
- Theodoros Dimitriou (Theodore Demetriou) as Agamemnon
- Elsie Pittas as young Elektra
- Petros Ampelas as young Orestes

== Awards ==
The film was entered into the 1962 Cannes Film Festival where it won the award of Best Cinematic Transposition. The film was also nominated for the Academy Award for Best Foreign Language Film. The film also won three awards in Thessaloniki Film Festival, for best film and best director (Michalis Cacoyannis) and best actress (Irene Papas).

== DVD ==
Electra was released on DVD by MGM Home Entertainment on March 5, 2002, as a Region 1 DVD.

== See also ==
- List of historical drama films
- Greek mythology in popular culture
- List of submissions to the 35th Academy Awards for Best Foreign Language Film
- List of Greek submissions for the Academy Award for Best Foreign Language Film
