= The Trojan Women (disambiguation) =

The Trojan Women is an ancient Greek tragedy written by Euripides, also translated as Women of Troy

The Trojan Women or The Women of Troy may also refer to:

- The Trojan Women (film), a 1971 American-British-Greek drama film, based on Euripides' play
- The Women of Troy, 2021 novel by Pat Barker
- Women of Troy, nickname for the women's athletic teams USC Trojans, representing the University of Southern California
