= Odes (Irene Papas album) =

Studio album by Irene Papas with Vangelis
- Released: 1979
- Recorded: London, 1979
- Studios: Nemo Studios, London
- Genre: Electronic
- Length: 51:27
- Label: Polydor
- Producer: Vangelis

Irene Papas chronology
Songs of Theodorakis (1968)	Odes (1979)	Rapsodies (1986)

Vangelis chronology
China (1979)	Odes (1979)	Opera Sauvage (1979)

Professional ratings
Review scores
Source	Rating
Allmusic	4.5/5 stars
Record Collector	3/5 stars

Odes is a studio album by Greek actress Irene Papas and composer Vangelis. All of the songs are traditional, except two which are original compositions by Vangelis. Recorded 1979 in Nemo Studios, London, the entirety of the album is performed and produced by Vangelis, along with Irene Papas' lead vocals and the addition of a five-people choir in the opening track.

== Track listing ==
1. "Les 40 Braves" (Gr: Σαράντα Παλληκάρια; En: The 40 Young Men) – 5:19
2. "Neranzoula" (Le Petit Oranger) (Gr: Νεραντζούλα; En: The Little Orange Tree) – 5:53
3. "La Danse du Feu" (Gr: Ο χορός της φωτιάς; En: Dance of fire) (Original Composition) – 6:06
4. "Les Kolokotronei" (Gr: Οι Κολοκοτρωναίοι; En: The Kolokotronis Family) – 3:20
5. "Le Fleuve" (Gr: Το Ποτάμι; En: The River) – 6:46
6. "Racines" (Gr: Οι ρίζες; En: The roots) (Original Composition) – 8:52
7. "Lamento" (Gr: Μοιρολοϊ; En: Lament) – 8:31
8. "Menousis" (Gr: Ο Μενούσης; En: Menousis) – 6:37
- Tracks 3 & 6 composed by Vangelis
- Tracks 1, 2, 4, 5, 7 & 8 were traditional, arranged by Vangelis with lyrics by Irene Papas and Arianna Stassinopoulos

== Notes ==
"Les 40 Braves" describes 40 young men on their way to conquer the city of Tripolitsa during the Greek War of Independence. During their journey, they meet an old man, asking them where are they going and their answer is "to conquer the city of Tripolitsa".

"Neranzoula" is a description of a small tangerine tree, which is analogous for the state of Greece during Ottoman occupation.

"Dance of fire" is a small trilogy. In the first part, we are introduced in the Greek folk dance "Πυρίχιος", the second and third part describe rural landscapes of Greece, presumably seen through a shepherd's point of view, the 3rd part showcases the sound of Greek flute, similar to the ocarina instrument, which is usually being played by shepherds, during the herd's eating in the meadow.

"Les Kolokotronei" were one of the most important Greek families in the Greek Resistance and Independence movements. The lyrics describe the shame they feel from Turkish occupation of their land, in the extent that they never set foot on the land, until it's being freed. They do everything on horseback, fighting, going to church, celebrating etc.

"The river" talks about the overwhelming beauty of Jannes, a famous Greek river in Messinia, Peloponessos.

"The roots" is an expanded version of the aforementioned Greek country landscape. Here, Vangelis uses a similar arrangement, which at the same time has a strong resemblance to his older composition "we were all uprooted" from his "Earth" album.

"Lamento" is sung by a mother who has lost her daughter, described in the lyrics as a little boat, decorated for departure. The song describes the mother's pain at her loss and her daughter's denial to leave the world of the living.

"Menousis" describes the events of a character in folk tale (probably a real individual), who in his drunkenness kills his wife because of her supposed infidelity.

== Certifications ==
Region	Certification	Certified units/sales
Greece (IFPI Greece)	Gold	50,000^{^}
^{^} Shipments figures based on certification alone.
