= Zeitenlik =

Cemetery in Thessaloniki, Greece

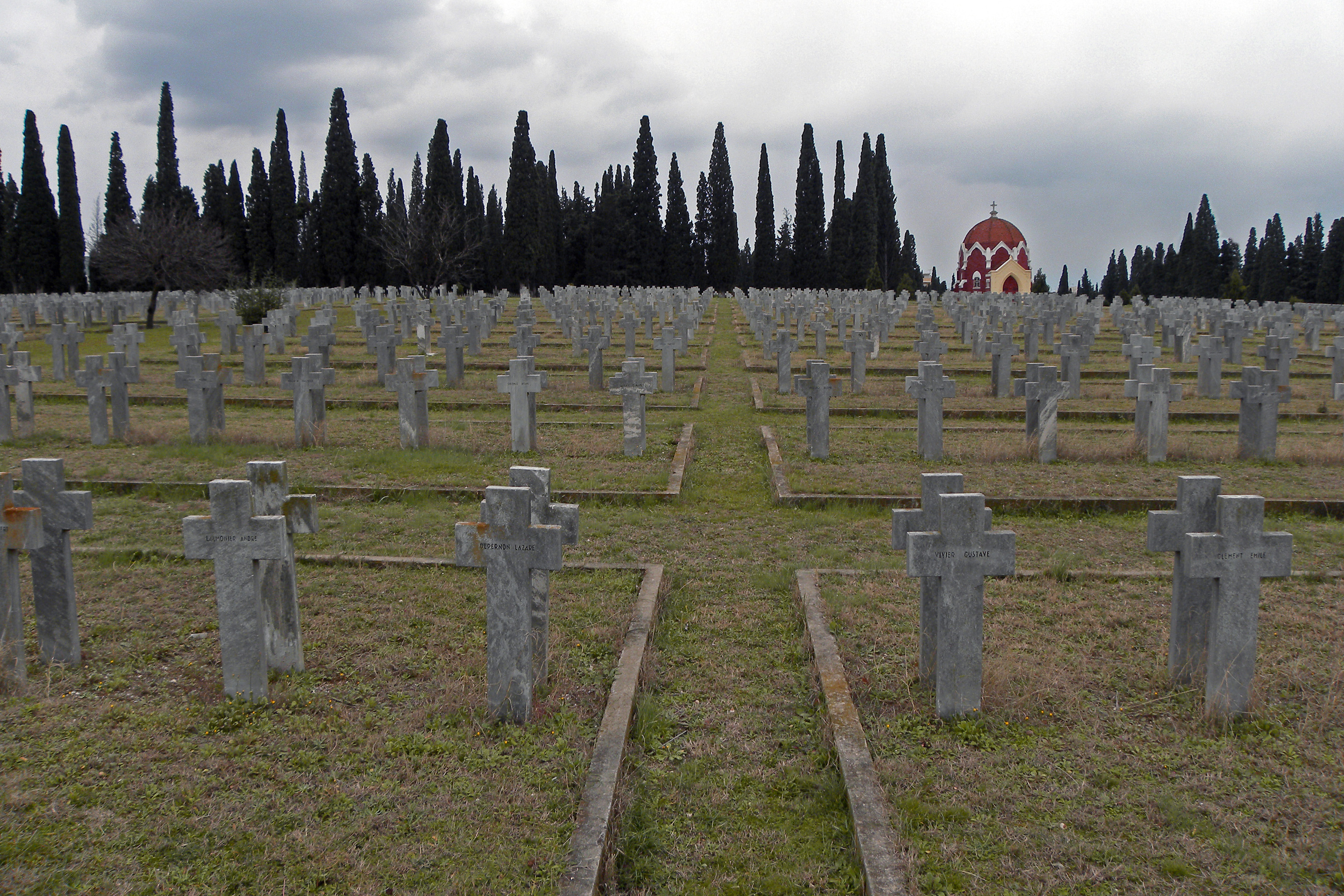
- Interior
- Interactive map of Zeitenlik

Details
- Established: November 1920
- Location: Mikis Theodorakis Avenue, Thessaloniki, Central Macedonia, Greece
- Country: Greece
- Coordinates: 40.654441°N 22.933713°E
- Type: Public

Zeitenlik (Greek: Ζέιτενλικ, Serbian Cyrillic: Зејтинлик) is an Allied military cemetery and World War I memorial park in Thessaloniki, the largest military cemetery in Greece. It contains the graves of circa 20,000 Serbian, French, British, Italian, Russian and Greek soldiers and Bulgarian POWs, who died in the battles on the Salonika front during World War I. The largest part of the complex is the Serbian Military Graveyard, which contains the remains of c. 7,500 soldiers. The French sector contains the remains of 8,000 French soldiers. The Italian sector holds about 3,000 graves; the British sector holds about 2,000 graves, and there is also the Russian sector with about 400 graves. There are also graves of Bulgarian POWs, as well as of fallen Greeks transferred from the battlefields of Kilkis.

The complex is located on the place where the Main Hospital of the Serbian Army was located during the war. The name comes from the Turkish word Zeytin which means Olive. It can be translated as Olive Grove. It is located on Mikis Theodorakis Avenue, about 1.5 kilometres (0.93 mi) from the city centre of Thessaloniki.

== History ==
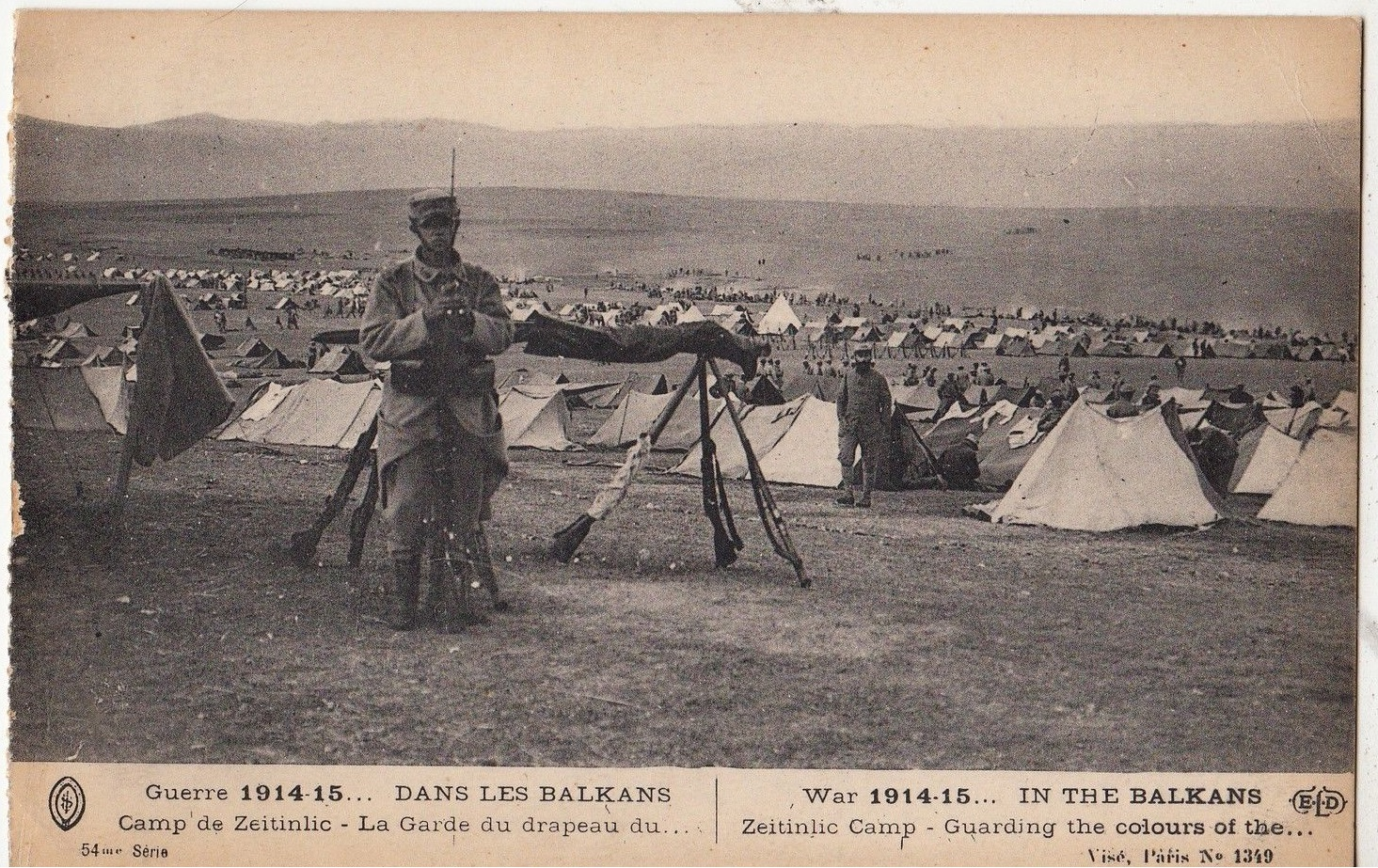
Photo of the camp, 1914-15

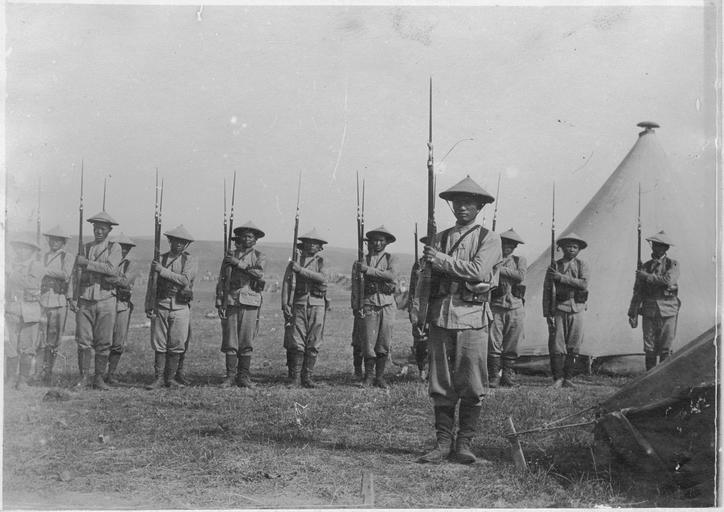
Tonkinese (Vietnamese) Tirailleurs, 1916

The agreement establishing the Allied cemeteries was signed on 20 November 1920, by the Greek Governor-General of Thessaloniki, Anastasios Adossides, and allies Vojvoda Živojin Mišić (Serbia), General Jean Noël Boucher (France), Field Marshal George Francis Milne (United Kingdom) and Colonel Curgio Giamberini (Italy). The Greek government bought the land where the cemetery would be created and ceded it to the allies in usufruct, while maintenance of the cemeteries was left to their governments.

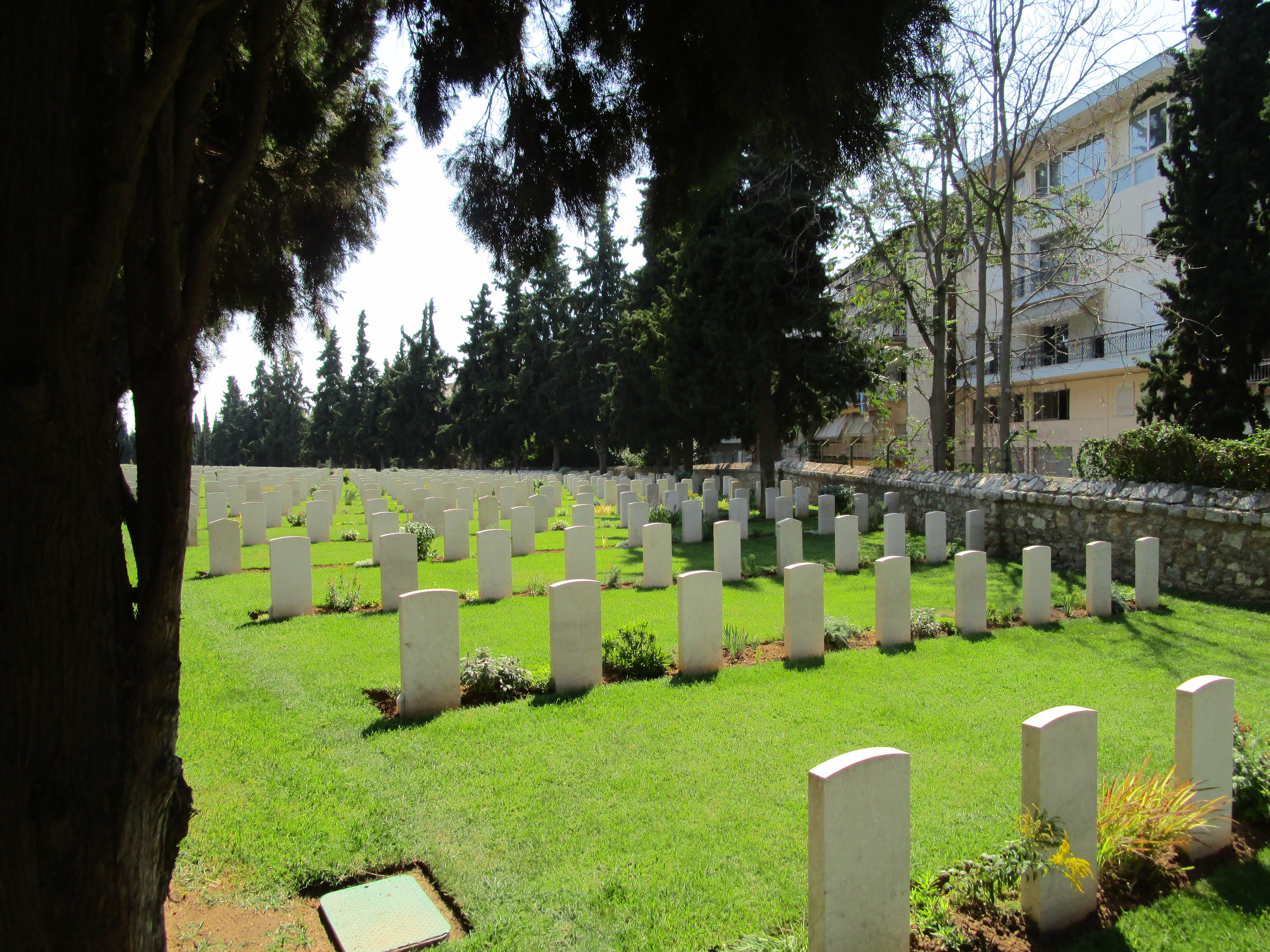
British graves

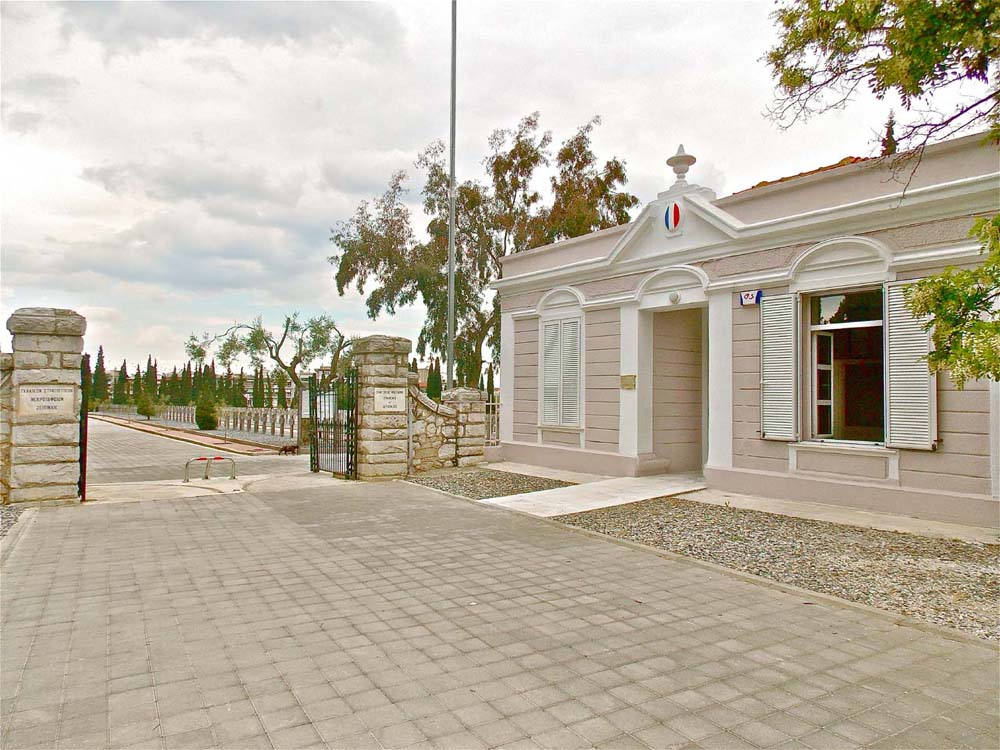
French sector museum

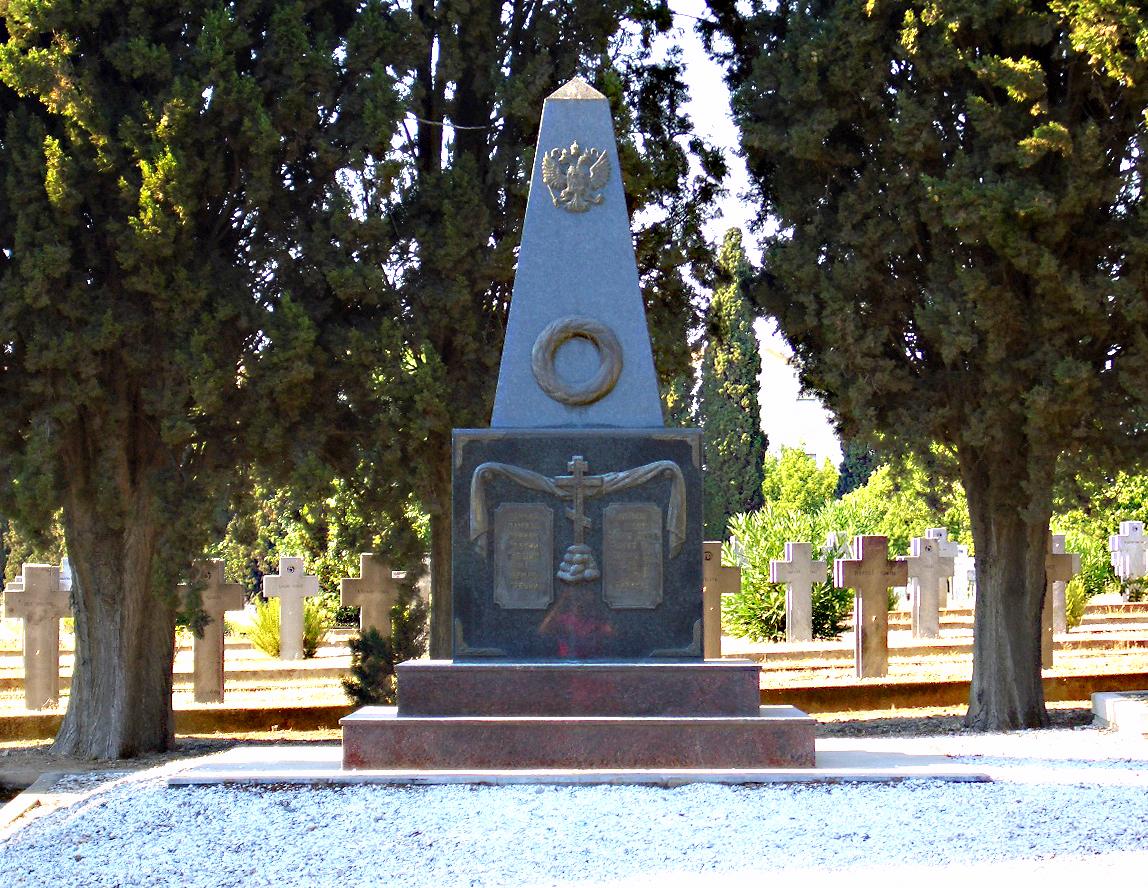
Russian monument

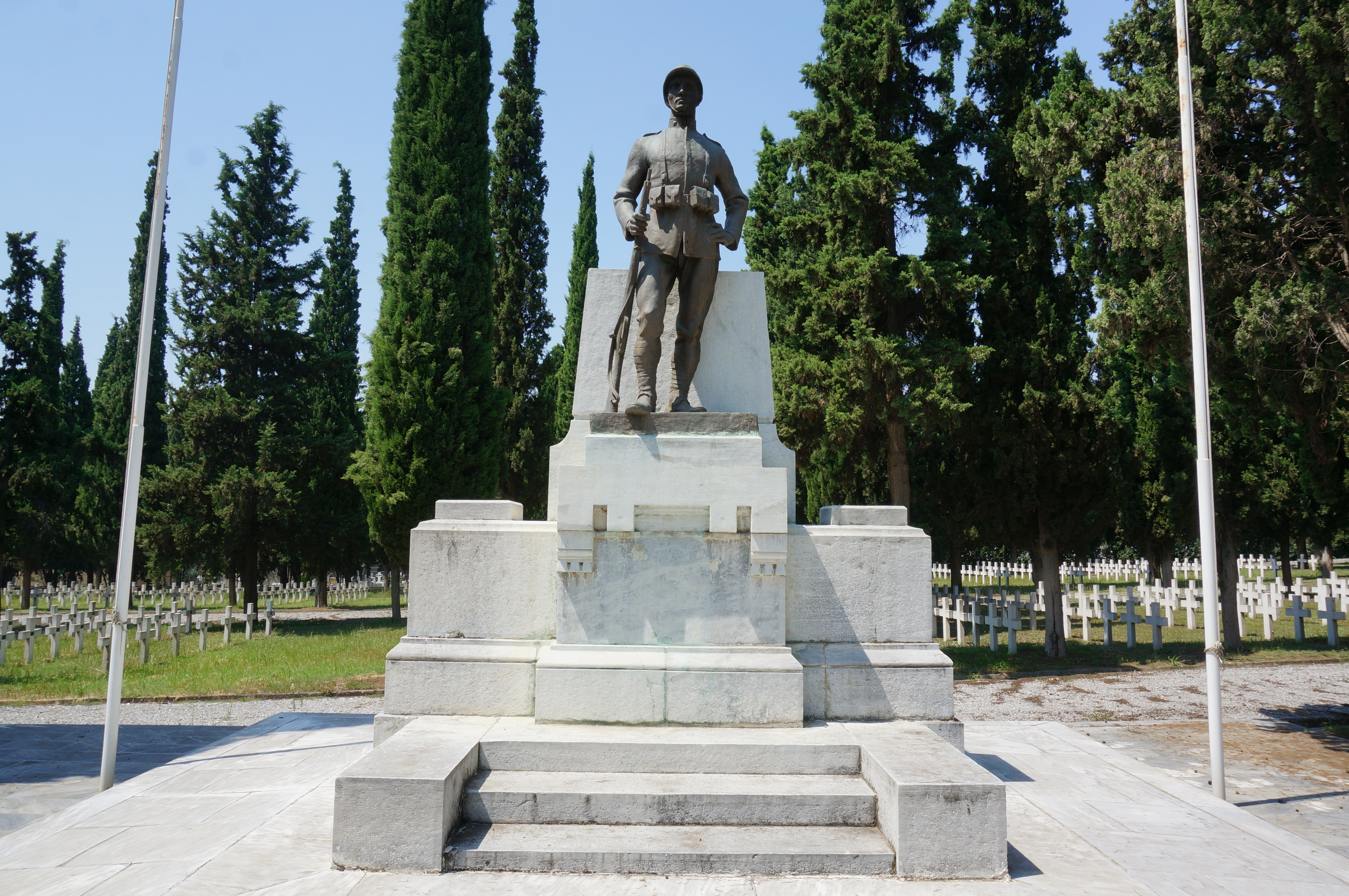
Statue in the Italian sector

The project began in 1926, when Savo Mihailović was appointed to head the group that was tasked to collect the remains of warriors scattered across a wide area where the battle raged on the Salonika front. They visited over 250 cemeteries to find allied soldier graves and move them to the new cemetery space.

The conceptual design of the Serbian military cemetery was selected that same year in a contest, and the design of the architect Aleksandar Vasić was chosen and further elaborated by Nikolaj Krasnov. All materials for the construction of the cemetery came from Serbia, where it was also first processed. Therefore, the preparations for the start of construction lasted until 1933 because of the need to prepare large quantities of trimmed stone for the construction of the mausoleum, chapel and charnel house, and about 2000 marble crosses.

Finishing work began in 1933 under the direction of architect Budimir Hristodulo, one of the 1300 Corporals. It was concluded at the end of 1936, and on 11 November 1936, on Armistice Day of World War I, the mausoleum, chapel and crypt were officially sanctified. Greece gave free land to build a complex of 70,000 m², and all material and work on the cemetery was released from customs and exempted from tax.

Stone from the Momin Kamen quarry, which is located near the village of Džep in Serbia was used for building the mausoleum and crosses, granite from Kadina Luka near Ljig was used for the slabs, and the cement was from Beočin. Cypress trees, delivered as young seedlings from Hilandar, were planted around the Serbian part of the cemetery. The mosaic in the chapel, which incorporates motifs from medieval Serbian frescoes, is the work of the Greek artist Voila.

During World War II, the burden of preserving the cemetery fell onto the guard Đuro Mihailović. In spite of the war, the teen managed to preserve the cemetery and prevent Nazi looting of books and relics.

Thanks to the efforts of the Secretariat for the Culture of Serbia, funds for the restoration of the cemetery were collected. Works were carried out from 25 September to 22 October 1969, and apart from the renovation of the vast complex, a sidewalk was built in front of the entrance to the cemetery, and an iron inscription saying "Serbian military cemetery" was placed on the front gate.

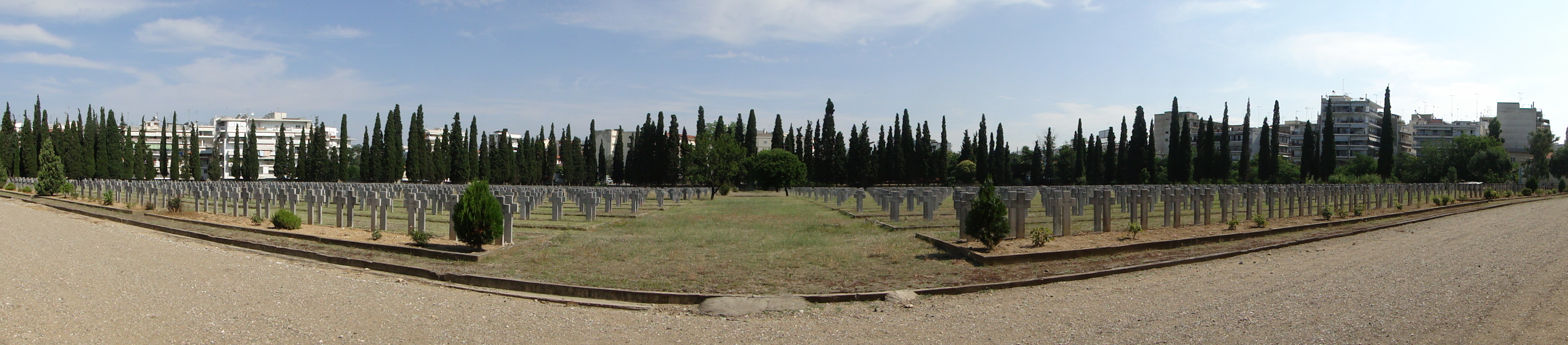
View of the French sector

== Cemetery keepers, the Mihailović family ==
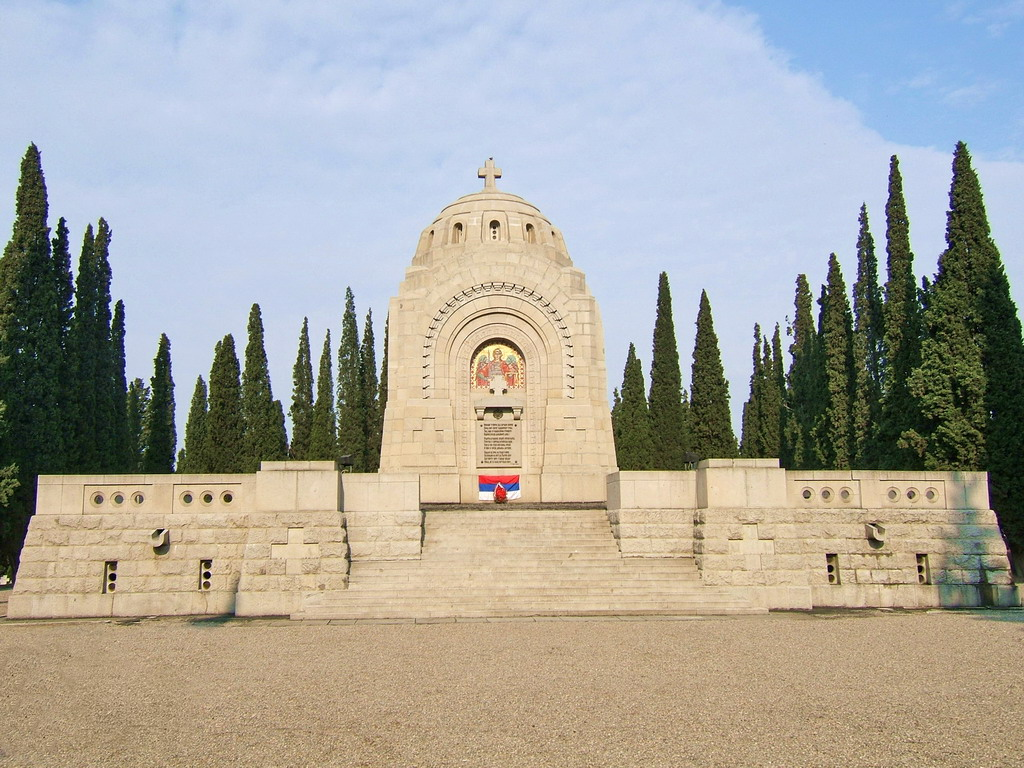
The Serbian chapel

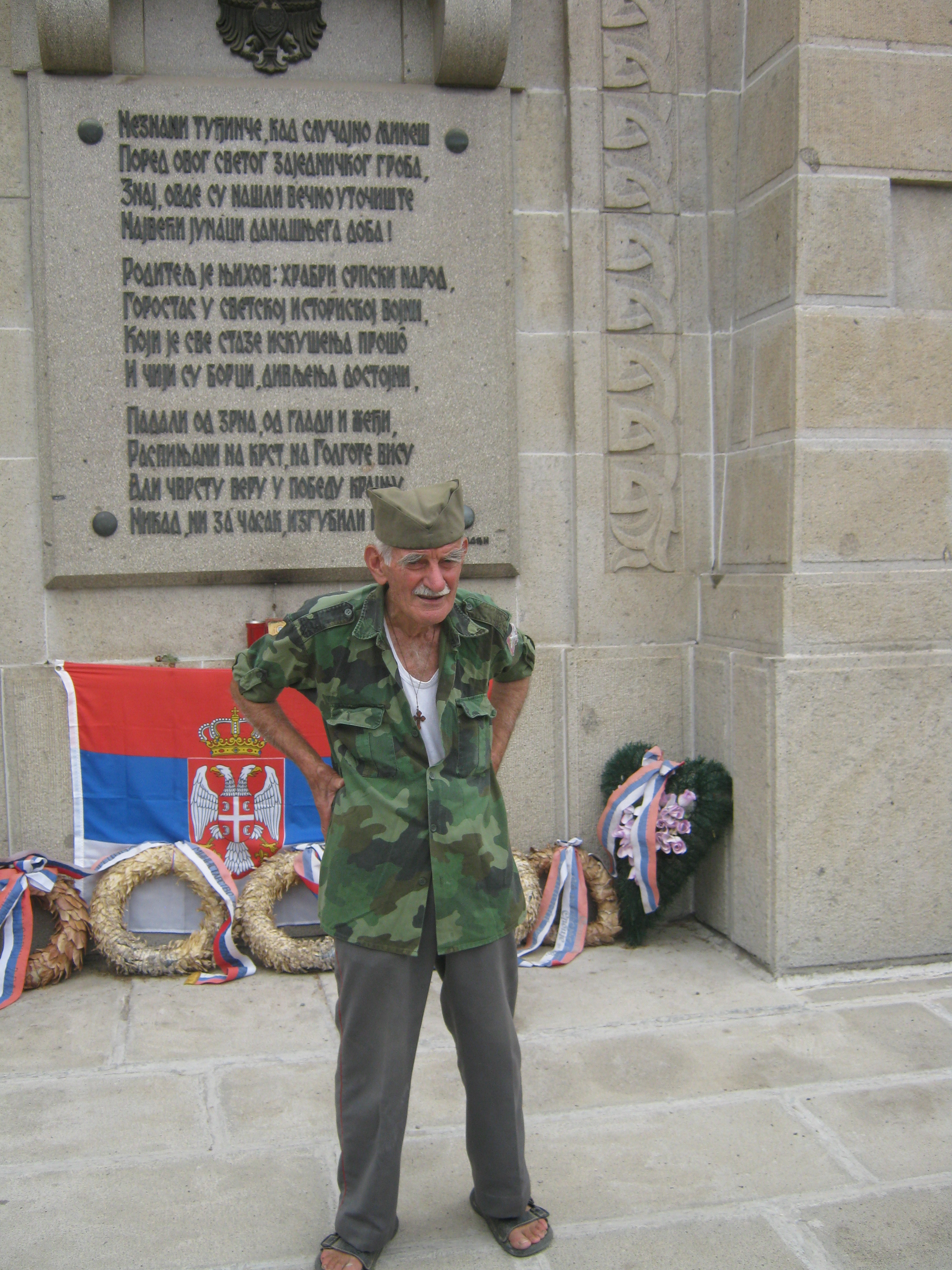
Đorđe Mihailović in front of the cenotaph

The first keeper of the graveyard was Savo Mihailović, who was the head of the group that was responsible for the exhumation of Serbian soldiers and their transfer to the area of the future military cemetery. Mihailović, a Serb from Grbalj, collected the bodies of his dead friends and comrades, and then protected and guarded the cemetery until his death in 1928. He lived in a house built for him and his family, inside the cemetery proper. After his death, his remains were also buried in Zeitenlik. He was succeeded by his son Đuro Mihailović, who succeeded in preserving the cemetery and relics from Nazi looting during World War II. Đuro died in 1961 and was buried along with his father in Zeitenlik. Thereafter, the keeper, host and curator of the Serbian Military Cemetery at Zeitenlik was Đorđe Mihailović, Đuro's son and Savo's grandson, who lived in the keeper's house with his wife and daughter. Although new burials at Zeitinlik are forbidden, a special decree was issued that allowed Đorđe to be the last person buried here when he died, which happened in July 2023 when Đorđe died at the age of 95.

== See also ==
- Serbian Campaign (World War I)
- Balkans Campaign (World War I)
