= Irene Papas =

Greek actress and singer (1929–2022)

- Ειρήνη Παππά
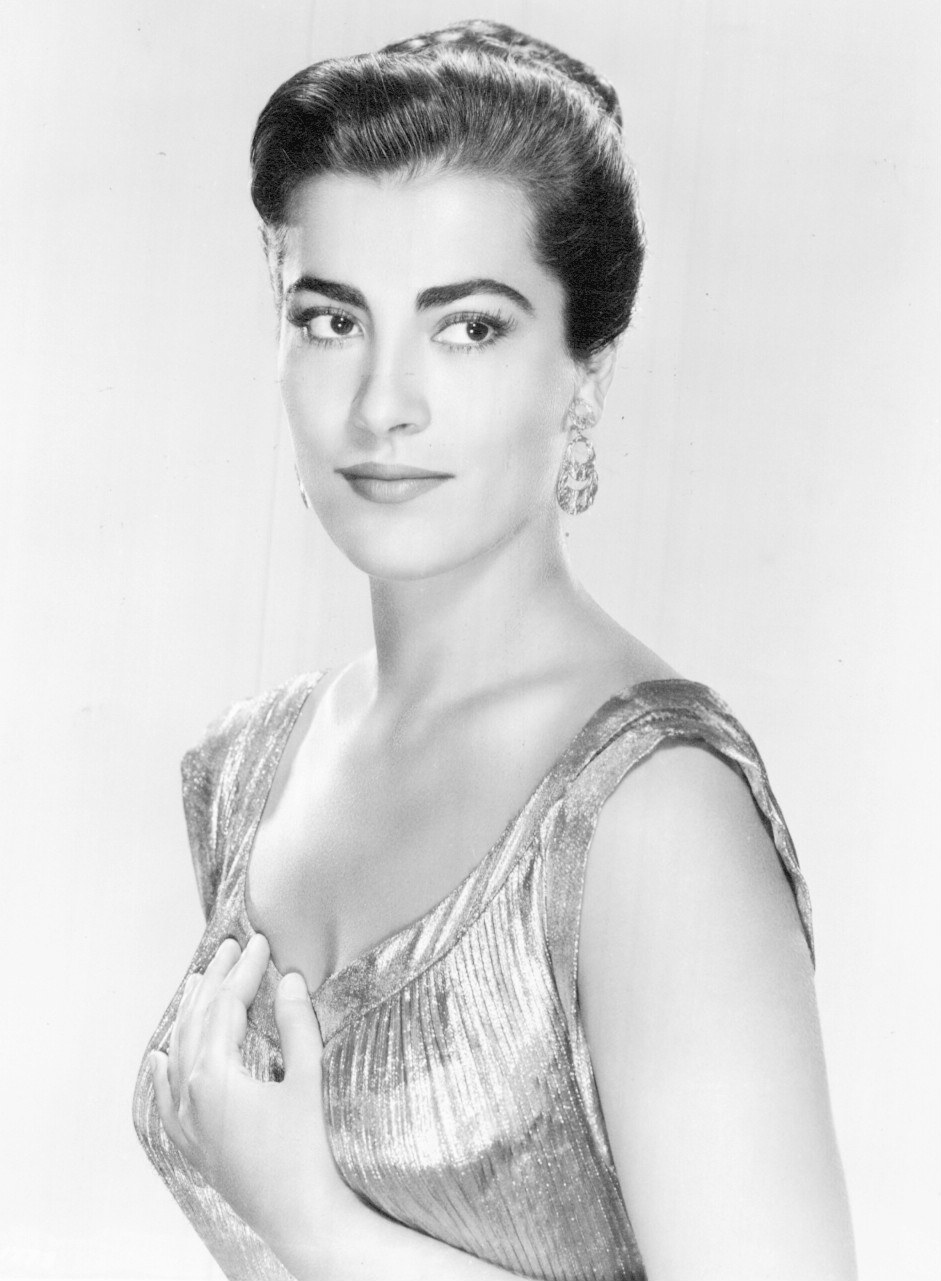
- Papas in 1956
- Born: Eirini Lelekou; 3 September 1929; Chiliomodi, Greece
- Died: 14 September 2022 (aged 93); Athens, Greece
- Resting place: Chiliomodi Cemetery, Greece
- Occupations: Actress; singer
- Years active: 1948–2003
- Known for: Heroines of Greek tragedy; powerful stage presence
- Spouses: Alkis Papas (m. 1947; div. 1951) José Kohn (m. 1957; annul. 1957)
- Relatives: Manousos Manousakis (nephew); Lida-Maria Manthopoulou (grandniece)

Irene Papas or Pappas (Greek: Ειρήνη Παππά, romanized: Eiríni Pappá, IPA: [iˈrini paˈpa]; born Eirini Lelekou [Ειρήνη Λελέκου]; 3 September 1929 – 14 September 2022) was a Greek actress and singer who starred in over 70 films in a career spanning more than 50 years. She gained international recognition through such popular award-winning films as The Guns of Navarone (1961), Zorba the Greek (1964) and Z (1969). She was a powerful protagonist in films including The Trojan Women (1971) and Iphigenia (1977). She played the title roles in Antigone (1961) and Electra (1962). She had a fine singing voice, on display in the 1968 recording Songs of Theodorakis.

Papas won Best Actress awards at the Berlin International Film Festival for Antigone and from the National Board of Review for The Trojan Women. Her career awards include the Golden Arrow Award in 1993 at Hamptons International Film Festival, and the Golden Lion Award in 2009 at the Venice Biennale.

== Early life ==
Papas was born as Eirini Lelekou (Ειρήνη Λελέκου) on 3 September 1929, (Note: There has been confusion over the date of birth, with the Enciclopedia Italiana stating in 1994 that Papas was born on 3 September 1926 rather than 3 September 1929. This error was propagated by other sources (for example, Finos Film). Papas addressed the confusion directly, noting that she had often been described as three years older than she actually was. At the start of an interview on Greek state television in 2004 she said "I was born on Sept. 3, 1929. All the papers are there in Chiliomodi [her home village]".) in the village of Chiliomodi, outside Corinth, Greece. Her mother, Eleni Prevezanou (Ελένη Πρεβεζάνου), was a schoolteacher, and her father, Stavros Lelekos (Σταύρος Λελέκος), taught classical drama at the Sofikós school in Corinth. She recalled that she was always acting as a child, making dolls out of rags and sticks; after a touring theatre visited the village performing Greek tragedies with the women tearing their hair, she used to tie a black scarf around her head and perform for the other children. The family moved to Athens when she was seven years old. She was educated from age 15 at the National Theatre of Greece Drama School in Athens, taking classes in dance and singing. She found the acting style advocated by the school old-fashioned, formal, and stylised, and rebelled against it, causing her to have to repeat a year; she eventually graduated in 1948.

== Career ==
=== Theatre ===
Papas began her acting career in Greece in variety and traditional theatre, in plays by Ibsen, Shakespeare, and classical Greek tragedy, before moving into film in 1951. She continued to appear on stage from time to time, including in New York City in productions such as Dostoevsky's The Idiot. She played in Iphigenia in Aulis in Broadway's Circle in the Square Theatre in 1968.

She starred in Medea in 1973 on Broadway. Reviewing the production in the New York Times, drama critic Clive Barnes described her as a "very fine, controlled Medea", smouldering with a "carefully dampened passion", constantly fierce. Theatre critic Walter Kerr also praised the performance. Both saw in her portrayal what Barnes called an "unrelenting determination and unwavering desire for justice". She appeared in The Bacchae in 1980 at Circle in the Square, and in Electra at the Ancient Theatre of Epidaurus in 1985.

=== Film ===
==== Europe ====
Her first film work was a small part in Nikos Tsiforos's 1948 Fallen Angels (Greek, "Hamenoi angeloi"). She began to attract attention with her role in Frixos Iliadis's 1952 film Dead City (Greek, "Nekri Politeia"). The film was shown at the Cannes Film Festival, where Papas was welcomed by the international press, and photographed spending time with the wealthy Aga Khan. Greek filmmakers thought her a noncommercial actress, and she tried her hand abroad, signing with Lux Film in Italy, where the publicity for Dead City was enough to launch her as a film star. She played in Lux's 1954 films Attila and Theodora, Slave Empress, which attracted Hollywood's attention. Many other films followed, both in Greece and internationally.

She was a leading figure in cinematic transcriptions of ancient tragedy, playing the title roles in George Tzavellas's Antigone (1961) and Michael Cacoyannis's Electra (1962), with her powerful portrayal of the doomed heroine; this brought her star status. She played Helen in Cacoyannis's The Trojan Women (1971) opposite Katharine Hepburn, and Clytemnestra with "smoldering eyes", according to The New York Times, in his Iphigenia (1977).

Papas made her name playing powerful women in films of Greek tragedy, such as Clytemnestra in Euripides's play Iphigenia in Aulis.

Papas became fluent in Italian, and many of her films were made in that language. She said Cacoyannis was the only director that she was really comfortable with, describing herself as "too obedient" to stand up to other directors. Cacoyannis said that she was part of his decision to make Iphigenia, forming his image of Clytemnestra with her power and physique, and her unselfpitying, impersonal anger against the injustice of life, something that in his view was accessible to actors from countries like Greece that had experienced long years of oppression.

Alejandro Valverde García described Papas's part in The Trojan Women as "the most convincing cinematographic Helen that has ever been represented", noting that the script was written with her in mind.

==== Hollywood ====
Papas debuted in American film with a bit part in the B-movie The Man from Cairo (1953); her next American film was a much larger role as Jocasta Constantine, with James Cagney, in the Western Tribute to a Bad Man (1956). She then starred in films such as The Guns of Navarone (1961) and Cacoyannis's Zorba the Greek (1964), based on Nikos Kazantzakis's novel of the same name, set to Mikis Theodorakis's music, establishing her reputation internationally.

In The Guns of Navarone, she stars as a resistance fighter involved in the action, an addition to Alistair Maclean's novel, providing a love interest and a strong female character. Gerasimus Katsan comments that she plays a "hard as nails" partisan in The Guns of Navarone, "capable, unafraid, stoic, patriotic and heroic"; when the men hesitate, she kills the treacherous Anna; but although she interacts romantically with Andreas (Anthony Quinn), she remains "cool and rational", revealing little of her sensual persona; she is as tough as the men, like the stereotype of a Greek village woman, but she is contrasted with them in the film.

Bosley Crowther called her appearance in Zorba "dark and intense as the widow". Katsan said that she was most often remembered as the "sensual widow" in Zorba. Katsan wrote that she was again contrasted to the other village women, playing "the beautiful and tortured widow" who is eventually hunted to death with what Vrasidas Karalis called "elemental nobility". The scholar of film Jefferson Hunter wrote that Papas helped lift Zorba from being merely an "exuberant" film with the stark passion of her subplot role.

This success did not earn her an easy life; she stated that she did not work for 2 years after Electra, despite the prizes and acclamation; and again, she was out of work for 18 months after Zorba. It turned out to be her most popular film, but she said she earned only $10,000 from it.

Papas played leading roles in several critically acclaimed films. In Z (1969), her political activist's widow has been called "indelible". She played an admired Catherine of Aragon in Anne of the Thousand Days, opposite Richard Burton and Geneviève Bujold in 1969. In 1976, she starred in The Message about the origin of Islam, a film which Mark Cousins stated was "perhaps seen by as many people as...any film in cinema history." In 1982, she appeared in Lion of the Desert. One of her last film appearances was in Captain Corelli's Mandolin in 2001, where in Katsan's view she was underused reprising her strong peasant woman from The Guns of Navarone and the widow from Zorba.

==== Stardom ====
Scholars have noted that Papas was often photographed in profile alongside Hellenic sculptures to present her as the "quintessential idea of Greek beauty".

The Enciclopedia Italiana described Papas as a typical Mediterranean beauty, with a lovely voice both in singing and acting, greatly talented and with an adventurous spirit. Olga Kourelou added that film-makers from Cacoyannis onwards have made systematic use of her looks: "Her chalk-white skin and long black hair, dark brown eyes, thick arched eyebrows, and straight nose make Papas appear as the quintessential idea of Greek beauty." She writes that the camera has lingered in close-up on Papas's face, and that she is often photographed in profile, intentionally recalling the iconography of ancient Greece. Kourelou gives as example the profile shot in Iphigenia where Papas sings a lullaby to her daughter, in front of a Hellenic sculpture of a woman, the shot bringing out the resemblance of their facial features; she notes that posters of Papas have often used the same motif.

Gerasimus Katsan wrote that she is the best-known and most recognisable Greek film star, "an actor with incredible range, power, and subtlety". In the view of the film critic Philip Kemp,

From the opening shot of Michael Cacoyannis's Electra, as the proud, implacable face emerges from encroaching shadows, it becomes impossible to imagine anyone else as Euripides's heroine. Erect, immutably dignified, dark eyes burning fiercely beneath heavy black brows, Irene Papas visibly embodies the sublimity of classical Greece, tragic yet serene.

Kemp described Papas as an awe-inspiring presence, which paradoxically limited her career. He admired her roles in Cacoyannis's films, including the defiant Helen of Troy in The Trojan Women; the vengeful, grief-stricken Clytemnestra in Iphigenia; and "memorably" as the cool but sensual widow in Zorba the Greek. David Thomson, in his Biographical Dictionary of Film, called Papas's manner in Iphigenia "blatant declaiming". She stood out in Costa-Gavras's 1968 political film Z, based on a real-life assassination, and in Ruy Guerra's 1983 Eréndira, with a screenplay by the novelist Gabriel García Márquez.

The film critic Roger Ebert observed that there were many "pretty girls" in cinema "but not many women", and called Papas a great actress. Ebert noted her uphill struggle, her height, 5 feet 10 inches (1.78 m) limiting the leading men she could play alongside, her accent limiting the roles she could take, and that "her unusual beauty is not the sort that superstar actresses like to compete with." Ordinary actors, he suggested, had trouble sharing the screen with Papas. All the same, her presence in many well-known movies, wrote Ebert, inspired "something of a cult".

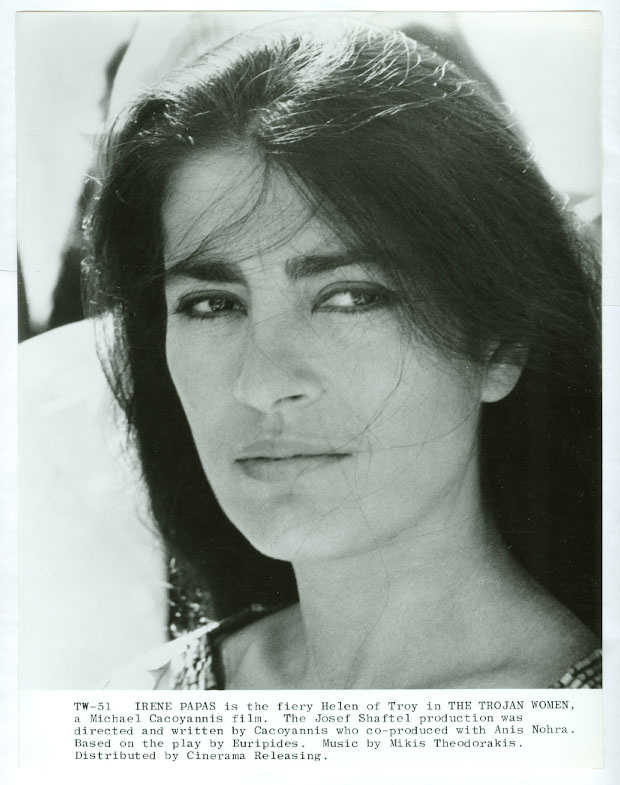
Papas in a publicity still for The Trojan Women (1971), where she played Helen of Troy

In his book on Greek cinema, Mel Schuster called Papas a great actress on the strength of her roles in four of Cacoyannis's films. He found her stage presence awe-inspiring, especially in Electra, and so powerful as to limit the film roles she could take, as she seemed to be an elemental force of nature. That resulted, Schuster stated, in Hollywood's treating her as "a Mother Earth who suffered and survived, but rarely talked or acted". That made her Helen in The Trojan Women, pacing up and down like a caged panther "with just the searching eyes darting through the bars", a "marvelous surprise", as Hollywood saw that in fact she was also an accomplished actor. In his view, casting her as the beautiful Helen was daring, as Papas was not, in 1971, as conventionally beautiful as a Hedy Lamarr or an Elizabeth Taylor; if she was the face that launched a thousand ships, then she brought "a force which might indeed have inspired a holocaust". Schuster commented that in each of the four Cacoyannis films, one shot of Papas's gave "indelible pleasure" and remained etched in the memory. In Iphigenia, that shot was in his view wisely placed at the end, under the closing credits, so that viewers see her until that moment as a versatile and powerfully histrionic actress, appropriate both to the ancient mythic dimensions of the tale and to a modern psychological reading of the myth.

Bella Vivante contrasted Papas's dark-haired Helen in The Trojan Women with the conventional choice of a blonde, Rossana Podestà, in Robert Wise's 1956 Helen of Troy. Where Wise emphasised Helen's seductive gaze and framed Podesta as an ideal beauty for the audience to look at, Cacoyannis made the scenes framed as Papas's gaze provide "an empowering female identity".

The scholar of Greek, Gerasimus Katsan, called her the most recognizable and best-known Greek film star, with "range, power, and subtlety", stating that her work made her a kind of national hero. She acted strong women with "beauty and sensuality, but also fierce independence and spirit".

Robert Stam wrote of Papas's role in Ruy Guerra's 1983 Eréndira that "the near-indestructible grandmother [of the eponymous young prostitute] reigns supreme"; she gives the effect of "a kind of queen" both through the regal props and her powerful performance, at once villainous and sympathetic, "an oracle who speaks truths, especially about men and love".

Kourelou wrote that although Papas had appeared in the films of both European and American "auteurs", she was best known as a tragedienne, citing the film-maker Manoel de Oliveira's remark that "this great tragedienne is the grand and beautiful image that embodies the deepest essence of the female soul. She is the image of Greece of all time ..., the mother of western civilisation". In Kourelou's view, Papas's tragic persona "offers an image of sublimated beauty with a transcendental quality"; she notes that Papas is neither "sexualised nor glamorised" with the single exception of her role as Helen in The Trojan Women.

In 1973, she was photographed by the Magnum photographer Ferdinando Scianna.

Asked about her acting for film and stage, and in classical and modern films, Papas stated that the acting techniques and method of expressing oneself are the same. One might, she said, need to use a louder voice on a classical stage, but "you always use the same soul". She denied having any secret to acting with such energy, but said that one's attitude to death was what drove action. Death was in her view "the greatest catalyst in human life"; while waiting to die, one had to decide what to do with one's life.

=== Singing ===
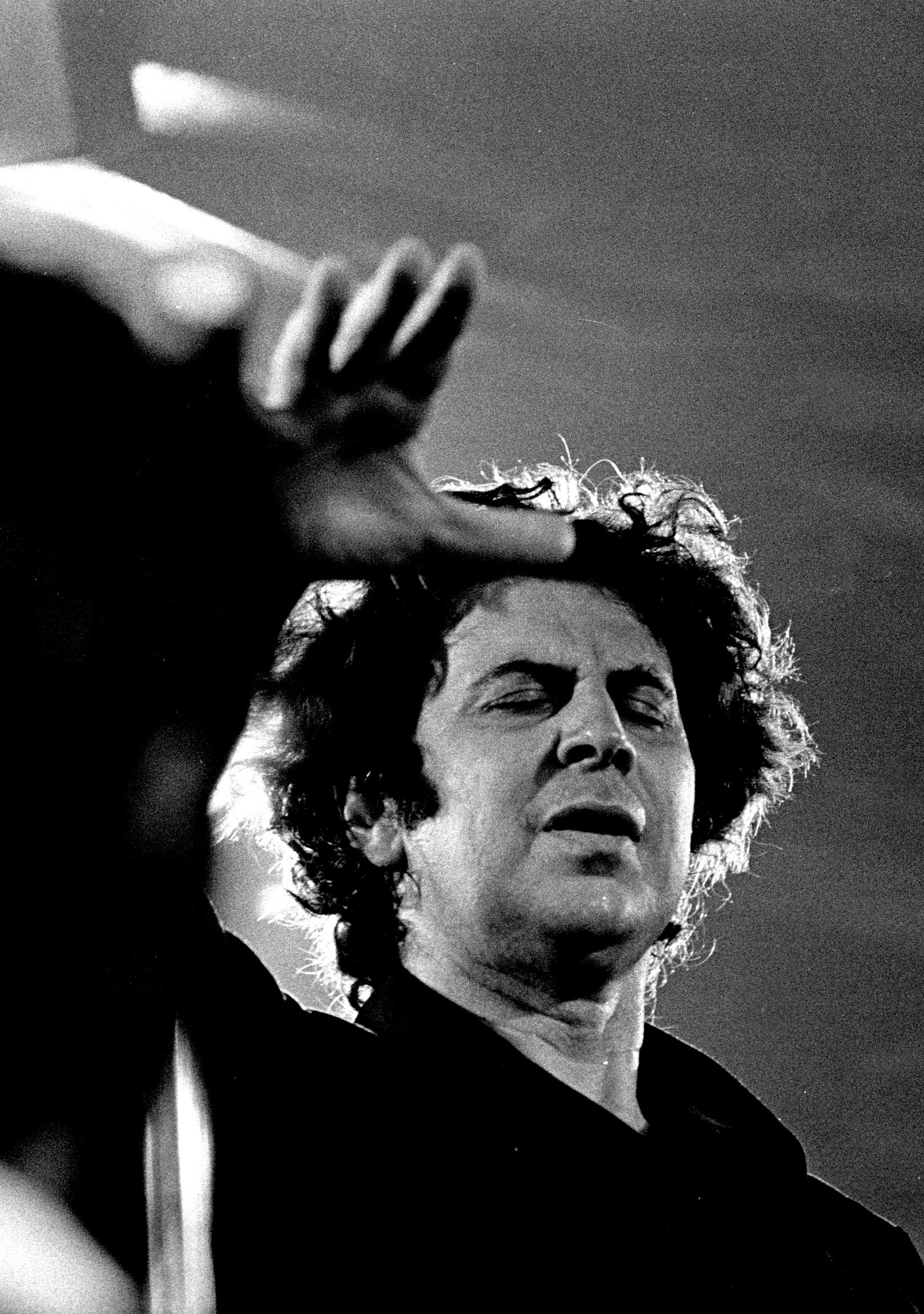
In 1968, Papas released a solo album of songs by Mikis Theodorakis.

In 1969, the RCA label released Papas' vinyl LP Songs of Theodorakis (INTS 1033). This has 11 songs sung in Greek, conducted by Harry Lemonopoulos and produced by Andy Wiswell, with sleeve notes in English by Michael Cacoyannis. It was released on CD in 2005 (FM 1680). Papas knew Mikis Theodorakis from working with him on Zorba the Greek as early as 1964. The critic Clive Barnes said of her singing performance on the album that "Irene Pappas is known to the public as an actress, but that is why she sings with such intensity, her very appearance, with her raven hair, is an equally dynamic means of expression".

In 1972, she appeared on the album 666 by the Greek rock group Aphrodite's Child on the track "∞" (infinity). She chants "I was, I am, I am to come" repeatedly and wildly over a percussive backing, worrying the label, Mercury, who hesitated over releasing the album, causing controversy with her "graphic orgasm".

In 1979, Polydor released her album of eight Greek folk songs entitled Odes, with electronic music performed (and partly composed) by Vangelis. The lyrics were co-written by Arianna Stassinopoulos. They collaborated again in 1986 for Rapsodies, an electronic rendition of seven Byzantine liturgy hymns, also on Polydor; Jonny Trunk wrote that there was "no doubting the power, fire and earthy delights of Papas' voice".

== Politics ==
In 1967, Papas, a lifelong communist, called for a "cultural boycott" against the "Fourth Reich", meaning the military government of Greece at that time. Her opposition to the regime sent her, and other artists such as Mikis Theodorakis, whose songs she sang, into exile when the military junta came to power in Greece in 1967; she moved into temporary exile in Italy and New York. When the junta fell in 1974, she returned to Greece, spending time both in Athens and in her family's village house in Chiliomodi as well as continuing to work in Rome.

== Personal life ==
In 1947, she married the film director Alkis Papas; they divorced in 1951. Her second marriage was to the film producer José Kohn in 1957; that marriage was later annulled. She was the aunt of the film director Manousos Manousakis and the actor Aias Manthopoulos.

In 2003 she served on the board of directors of the Anna-Marie Foundation, a fund which provided assistance to people in rural areas of Greece. In 2013 she began to suffer from Alzheimer's disease. Papas spent her final years in home care at her niece's house in Kifissia. She died there on 14 September 2022, at the age of 93, and was interred at the Chiliomodi Cemetery, Corinthia.

== Awards and distinctions ==
- 1961: 11th Berlin International Film Festival (Best Actress, for the film Antigone)
- 1962: Thessaloniki International Film Festival (Best Actress, for the film Elektra)
- 1971: National Board of Review (Best Actress, for the film The Trojan Women)
- 1987 Venice Film Festival jury president
- 1993: Golden Arrow Award for lifetime achievement at Hamptons International Film Festival
- 1993: Flaiano Prize for Theatre (Career Award)
- 2009: Cairo International Film Festival (Lifetime Achievement Award)
- 2009: Leone d'oro alla carriera (Golden Lion career award), Venice Biennale

She received the honours of Commander of the Order of the Phoenix in Greece, Commandeur des Arts et des Lettres in France, and Commander of the Civil Order of Alfonso X, the Wise in Spain.

In 2017, it was announced that the National Theatre of Greece's drama school would move to a new "Irene Papas – Athens School" on Agiou Konstantinou Street in Athens from 2018.

== Discography ==
- 1968 : Songs of Theodorakis, in concert in New York, music conducted by Harry Lemonopoulos
- 1972 : 666 by Aphrodite's Child – Chanted vocals on "∞"
- 1979 : Ωδές – Odes – with Vangelis
- 1986 : Ραψωδίες – Rapsodies – with Vangelis

== Filmography ==
- Fallen Angels (Greek, "Hamenoi angeloi", 1948) as Liana
- Dead City (Greek, "Nekri Politeia", 1951) as Lena
- The Unfaithfuls (Italian, "Le Infideli", 1953) as Luisa Azzali
- Come Back! (Italian, "Torna!", 1953)
- The Man from Cairo (Italian, "Dramma del Casbah", 1953) as Yvonne Lebeau
- Vortex (Italian, "Vortice", 1953) as Clara
- Theodora, Slave Empress (Italian, "Teodora, Imperatrice di Bisanzio", 1954) as Faidia
- Attila (Italian, "Attila, il flagello di Dio", 1954) as Grune
- Tribute to a Bad Man (1956) as Jocasta Constantine
- The Power and the Prize (1956)
- Bouboulina (Greek, 1959) as Laskarina Bouboulina
- The Guns of Navarone (1961) as Maria
- Antigone (Greek, 1961) as Antigone
- Electra (Greek, 1962) as Electra
- The Moon-Spinners (1964) as Sophia
- Zorba the Greek (1964) as the widow
- Trap for the Assassin (French, "Roger la Honte", 1966) as Julia de Noirville
- Witness Out of Hell (German, "Zeugin aus der Hölle", 1966) as Lea Weiss
- We Still Kill the Old Way (Italian, "A ciascuno il suo", 1967) as Luisa Roscio
- The Desperate Ones (Spanish, "Más allá de las montañas", 1967) as Ajmi
- The Odyssey (Italian, "L'Odissea", 1968, TV Mini-series) as Penelope
- The Brotherhood (1968) as Ida Ginetta
- Ecce Homo (Italian, "Ecce Homo – I sopravvissuti", 1968) as Anna
- Z (French, 1969) as Helene
- A Dream of Kings (1969) as Caliope
- Anne of the Thousand Days (1969) as Queen Katherine
- The Trojan Women (1971) as Helen of Troy
- Oasis of Fear (Un posto ideale per uccidere, 1971) as Barbara Slater
- Rome Good (Italian, "Roma Bene", 1971) as Elena Teopoulos
- N.P. (Italian, "N.P. – Il segreto", 1971) as the housewife
- Don't Torture a Duckling (Italian, "Non si servizia un paperino", 1972) as Dona Aurelia Avallone
- 1931, Once Upon a Time in New York (1972) as Donna Mimma
- Battle of Sutjeska (Yugoslav, "Sutjeska", 1973) as Boro's mother
- I'll Take Her Like a Father (Italian, "Le farò da padre", 1974) as Raimonda Spina Tommaselli
- Moses the Lawgiver (Italian, "Mose", 1974) (TV miniseries) as Zipporah
- Mohammad, Messenger of God (Arabic, "Ar-Risālah", 1976) as Hind bint Utbah
- Blood Wedding (Spanish, "Bodas de Sangre", 1977) as the mother
- Iphigenia (Greek, 1977) as Clytemnestra
- The Man of Corleone (Italian, "L'uomo di Corleone", 1977)
- Christ Stopped at Eboli (Italian, "Cristo si e fermato a Eboli", 1979) as Giulia
- Bloodline (1979) as Simonetta Palazzi
- Ring of Darkness (Italian, "Un'ombra nell'ombra", 1979) as Raffaella
- Lion of the Desert (Arabic, "Asadu alsahra", 1981) as Mabrouka
- The All Pepper Social Worker (Italian, "L'assistente sociale tutto pepe", 1981) as the fairy
- Manuel's Tribulations (French, "Les Tribulations de Manuel", 1982) (TV series)
- The Ballad of Mameluke (French, "La Ballade de Mamlouk", 1982)
- Eréndira (Mexico, 1983) as the grandmother
- Why Afghanistan? (French, "Afghanistan pourquoi?" 1983) as cultural attaché
- The Deserter (Italian, "Il disertore", 1983) as Mariangela
- In the Shade of the Great Oak (Italian, "All'ombra della grande quercia", 1984) (TV mini-series)
- Into the Night (Italian, Tutto in una notte, 1985) as Shaheen Parvizi
- The Assisi Underground (1985) as Mother Giuseppina
- Sweet Country (1987) as Mrs. Araya
- Chronicle of a Death Foretold (1987) as Angela's mother
- High Season (1987) as Penelope
- A Child Named Jesus (Italian, "Un bambino di nome Gesù", 1987) (TV film)
- The Cardboard Suitcase (Portuguese, "A Mala de Cartão", 1988) (TV miniseries), as Maria Amélia
- Plato's Banquet (Italian, "Il banchetto di Platone", 1988) as Diotima
- Island (1989) as Marquise
- The Green-eyed Cavaliers (French, "Les Cavaliers aux yeux verts", 1990) as Anasthasie Rouch
- The Detective Inspector (Italian, "L'ispettore anticrimine", 1993) as Maria
- Stolen Love (Italian, "Amore Rubato", 1993)
- Jacob (1994) (TV film) as Rebeccah
- Party (1996) as Irene
- The Odyssey (1997) (TV miniseries) as Anticlea
- Anxiety ("Inquietude", 1998) as the mother
- Yerma (Spanish, 1998) as the old pagan woman
- Captain Corelli's Mandolin (2001) as Drosoula
- A Talking Picture (2003) as Helena
