= Mikis Theodorakis Avenue =

Major street in Thessaloniki, Greece

- Λεωφόρος Μίκη Θεοδωράκη
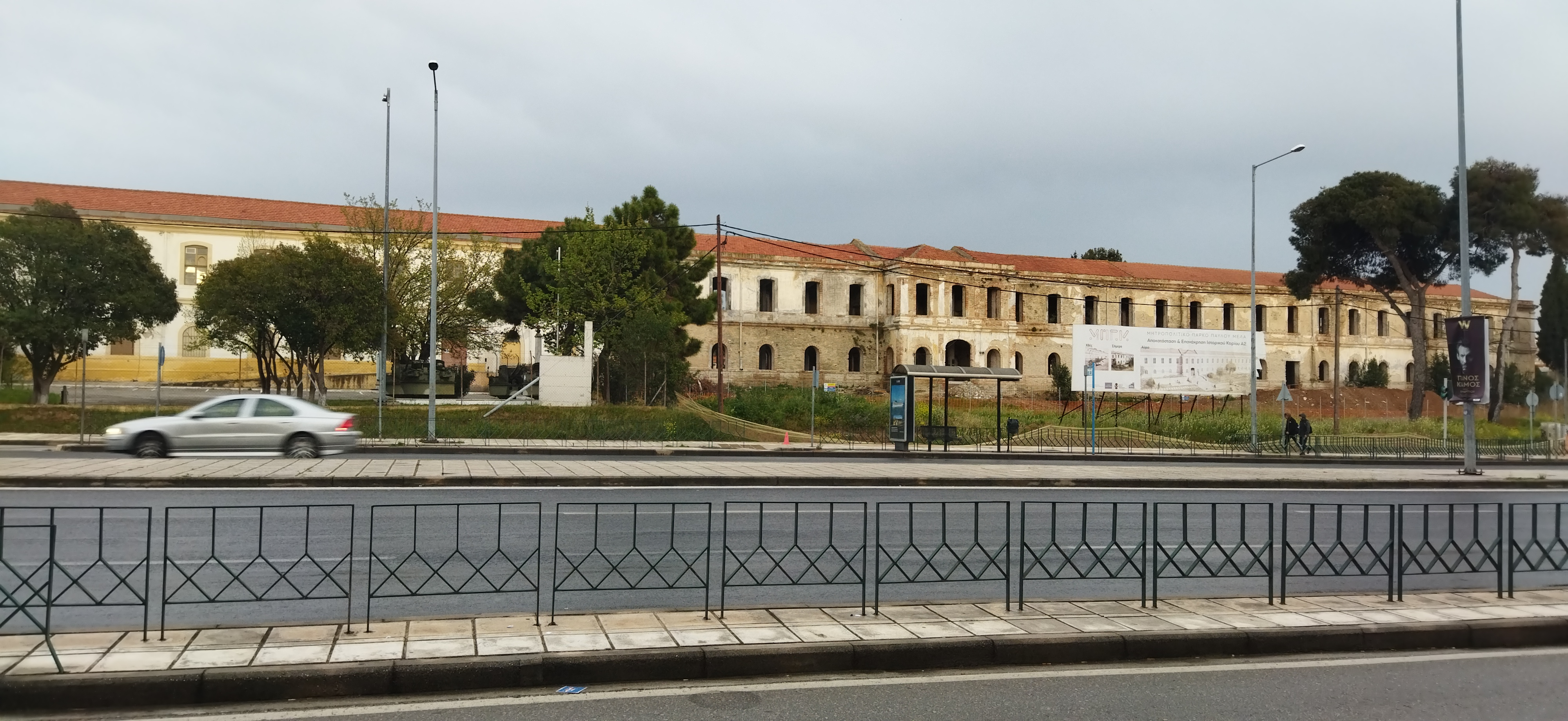
- Former Pavlos Melas Camp on the avenue
- Former name: Lagkada Street
- Maintained by: Domotechniki S.A. INTRAKAT
- Length: 5.9 km (3.7 mi)
- Location: Thessaloniki, Greece
- South end: Dimokratias Square
- North end: Egnatia Motorway near Titan Cement Industry

Construction
- Construction start: 1950s
- Completed: 1950s

Mikis Theodorakis Avenue (Greek: Λεωφόρος Μίκη Θεοδωράκη), formerly known as Lagkadas Street (Greek: Οδός Λαγκαδά), is the main northern entrance and exit route of Thessaloniki, Greece, connecting the city center to the northern suburbs and the Egnatia Motorway. The avenue starts at Dimokratias Square and ends at the junction with the Titan Cement facilities near the Egnatia Motorway. It is named after Mikis Theodorakis, Greek composer and Greek Resistance member.

The avenue intersects with important roads such as the National Road 11, the Thessaloniki Inner Ring Road, the Akriton Street, the Agion Panton Street, and the Egnatia Motorway.

From Dimokratias Square to the Akriton Street junction, the avenue has four lanes (two in each direction). Beyond Akriton Street, it expands to six lanes (three in each direction) with additional service roads. Mikis Theodorakis Avenue forms part of National Road 2.

== History ==
Before the 2004 Olympic Games, the boundary wall of the Pavlos Melas military camp was demolished and the road lanes were widened by removing adjacent informal structures. Since 2014, maintenance and upgrade works including pedestrian bridges have taken place along the avenue. In 2021, a definitive study began for widening one kilometer from Agion Panton Street to the former Pavlos Melas camp.

=== Name ===
The road was formerly known as Lagkadas Street, named after the town of Lagkadas, where the road eventually leads after its continuation into the National Road 2. The renaming officially came into effect on 1 January 2025, and the first sign was installed on 2 January 2025 in Ampelokipoi–Menemeni. The new name honors the renowned Greek composer Mikis Theodorakis. The president of the Mikis Theodorakis Museum, Paraskevas Paraskevopoulos, described it as a "historic decision" honoring "a great composer and fighter for democracy and freedom".

== Landmarks ==
Important landmarks along Mikis Theodorakis Avenue include:

- Dimokratias metro station
- Twelve-floor apartment buildings (known locally in Greek as δωδεκαώροφες - "dodekaorofes")
- Statue of resistance hero Georgios Ivanov
- Zeitenlik Allied Cemetery
- Former Pavlos Melas Military Camp (being transformed into a Metropolitan Park with museums)
- National Resistance Monument in Stavroupoli
- Pavlos Melas Town Hall
- Christos Tsakiris Cultural Center
- Saint Eleftherios Church in Stavroupoli

== Route ==
Junction	Destination	Notes
(K4)	Egnatia Motorway: Lagkadas, Serres, Kavala	See Egnatia Motorway
(1)	Oraiokastro	
(2)	West: Stavroupoli, Evosmos, Kordelio; East: Efkarpia	Stavroupoli Overpass, see Thessaloniki Ring Road
(3)	Stratou Avenue, Megalos Alexandros Settlement	
(4)	Towards Oraiokastro and Mavromichalis	
(5)	Thessaloniki Psychiatric Hospital	
(6)	Christos Tsakiris Cultural Center, Stavroupoli	
(7)	Stavroupoli Town Hall	Karaoli and Dimitriou Street
(8)	Kolokotroni Street	
(9)	Akriton and Davaki Streets, Pavlos Melas Camp	End of upgraded section
(10)	Zeitenlik Allied Cemetery, Neapoli	
(11)	Agia Paraskevi Cemetery, Neapoli	
(12)	El. Venizelou Street, Neapoli, Ampelokipoi	Agion Panton Street
(13)	Agiou Dimitriou Street, Agios Nestor Street	
(14)	Ampelokipoi	See Agiou Dimitriou Street
(15)	Dimokratias Square (Vardaris)	See Egnatia Street, Monastiriou Street
