= Giannis Fertis =

Greek actor (1938–2024)

- Γιάννης Φέρτης
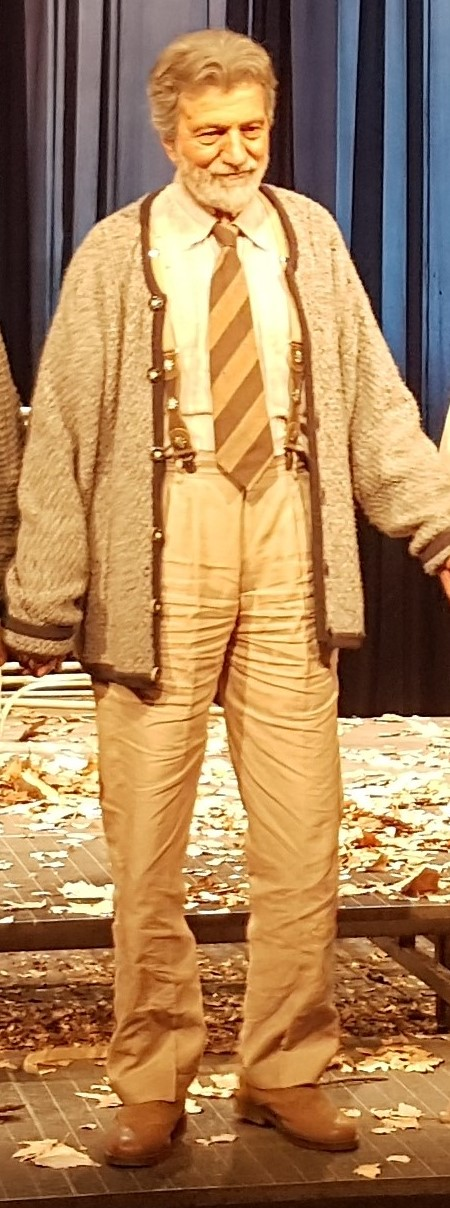
- Fertis in 2018
- Born: 21 April 1938; Athens, Kingdom of Greece
- Died: 14 April 2024 (aged 85); Athens, Greece
- Resting place: Dafni Cemetery, Phthiotis
- Occupation: Actor
- Years active: 1961–2019
- Spouses: Xenia Kalogeropoulou (m. 1963; div. 1972) Mimi Denissi (m. 1981; div. 1988) Marina Psalti (m. 2001)

Giannis Fertis (21 April 1938 – 14 April 2024) was a Greek actor. He appeared in more than 40 films beginning in 1961. He died on 14 April 2024, at the age of 85. He hailed from Dafni, Phthiotis.

== Selected filmography ==
Year	Title	Role	Notes
1962	Electra	Orestes	
2008	Slaves in Their Bonds		
