= Mikis Theodorakis =

Greek composer (1925–2021)

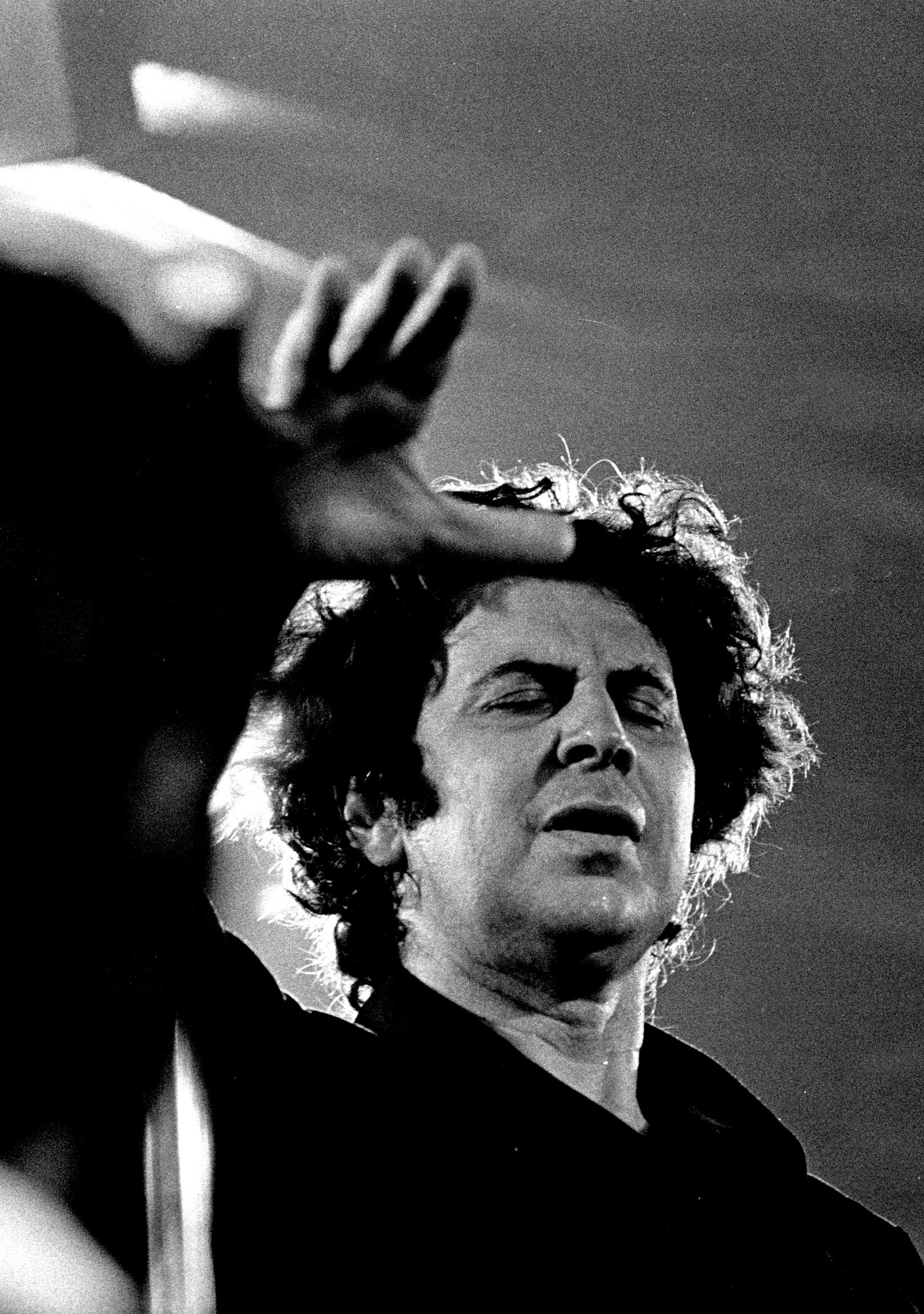
- Theodorakis conducting the orchestra in concert at Cultural Center "Fabrik" in Hamburg, 1971
- Born: Michail Theodorakis; 29 July 1925; Chios, Greece
- Died: 2 September 2021 (aged 96); Athens, Greece
- Resting place: Galatas Cemetery, Chania, Crete
- Occupations: Composer; political activist
- Political party: KKE
- Other political affiliations: New Democracy (1989–1993)
- Spouse: Myrto Altinoglou (m. 1953)
- Children: 2, including George
- Musical career
- Genre: 20th-century classical music
- Years active: 1943–2013
- Labels: Paredon; Folkways

Member of the Hellenic Parliament
- In office 1964–1967
- In office 1981–1986
- In office 1989–1993

Minister of State
- In office 11 April 1990 – 1 April 1993
- Prime Minister: Konstantinos Mitsotakis
- Website: www.mikistheodorakis.gr

Michail "Mikis" Theodorakis (Greek: Μιχαήλ "Μίκης" Θεοδωράκης [mixaˈil ˈmicis θeoðoˈracis]; 29 July 1925 – 2 September 2021) was a Greek composer and lyricist credited with over 1,000 works.

He scored for the films Zorba the Greek (1964), Z (1969), and Serpico (1973). He was a three-time BAFTA nominee, winning for Z. For the score in Serpico, he earned Grammy nominations. Furthermore, for the score to Zorba the Greek, with its song "Zorba's Dance", he was nominated for a Golden Globe.

He composed the "Mauthausen Trilogy", also known as "The Ballad of Mauthausen", which has been described as the "most beautiful musical work ever written about the Holocaust" and possibly his best work. Up until his death, he was viewed as Greece's best-known living composer. He was awarded the Lenin Peace Prize.

Politically, he was associated with the left because of his long-standing ties to the Communist Party of Greece (KKE). He was an MP for the KKE from 1981 to 1990. Despite this, however, he ran as an independent candidate within the centre-right New Democracy party in 1989, for the country to emerge from the political crisis created by the numerous scandals of the government of Andreas Papandreou. He helped establish a large coalition between conservatives, socialists and leftists. In 1990, he was elected to the parliament (as in 1964 and 1981), became a government minister under Konstantinos Mitsotakis, and fought against drugs and terrorism and in favor of culture and education. He continued to speak out in favour of leftist causes, Greek–Turkish–Cypriot relations, and against the War in Iraq. He was a key voice against the 1967–1974 Greek junta, which imprisoned him and banned his songs.

== Early life ==
Theodorakis was born on the Greek island of Chios and spent his childhood years in provincial Greek cities including Mytilene, Cephallonia, Patras, Pyrgos, and Tripoli. His father, a lawyer and a civil servant, was from the small village of Galatas on Crete and his mother, Aspasia Poulakis, was from an ethnically Greek family in Çeşme, in what is now Turkey. He was raised with Greek folk music and was influenced by Byzantine liturgy; as a child he had already talked about becoming a composer.

His fascination with music began in early childhood; he taught himself to write his first songs without access to musical instruments. He took his first music lessons in Patras and Pyrgos, where he was a childhood friend of George Pavlopoulos, and in Tripoli, Peloponnese, he gave his first concert at the age of seventeen. He went to Athens in 1943, and became a member of a Reserve Unit of ELAS. He led a troop in the fight against the British and the Greek right in the Dekemvriana. During the Greek Civil War he was arrested, sent into exile on the island of Icaria and then deported to the island of Makronisos, where he was tortured and twice buried alive.

During the periods when he was not obliged to hide, not exiled or jailed, he studied from 1943 to 1950 at the Athens Conservatoire under Filoktitis Economidis. In 1950, he finished his studies and took his last two exams "with flying colours". He went to Crete, where he became the "head of the Chania Music School" and founded his first orchestra.

== Studies in Paris ==
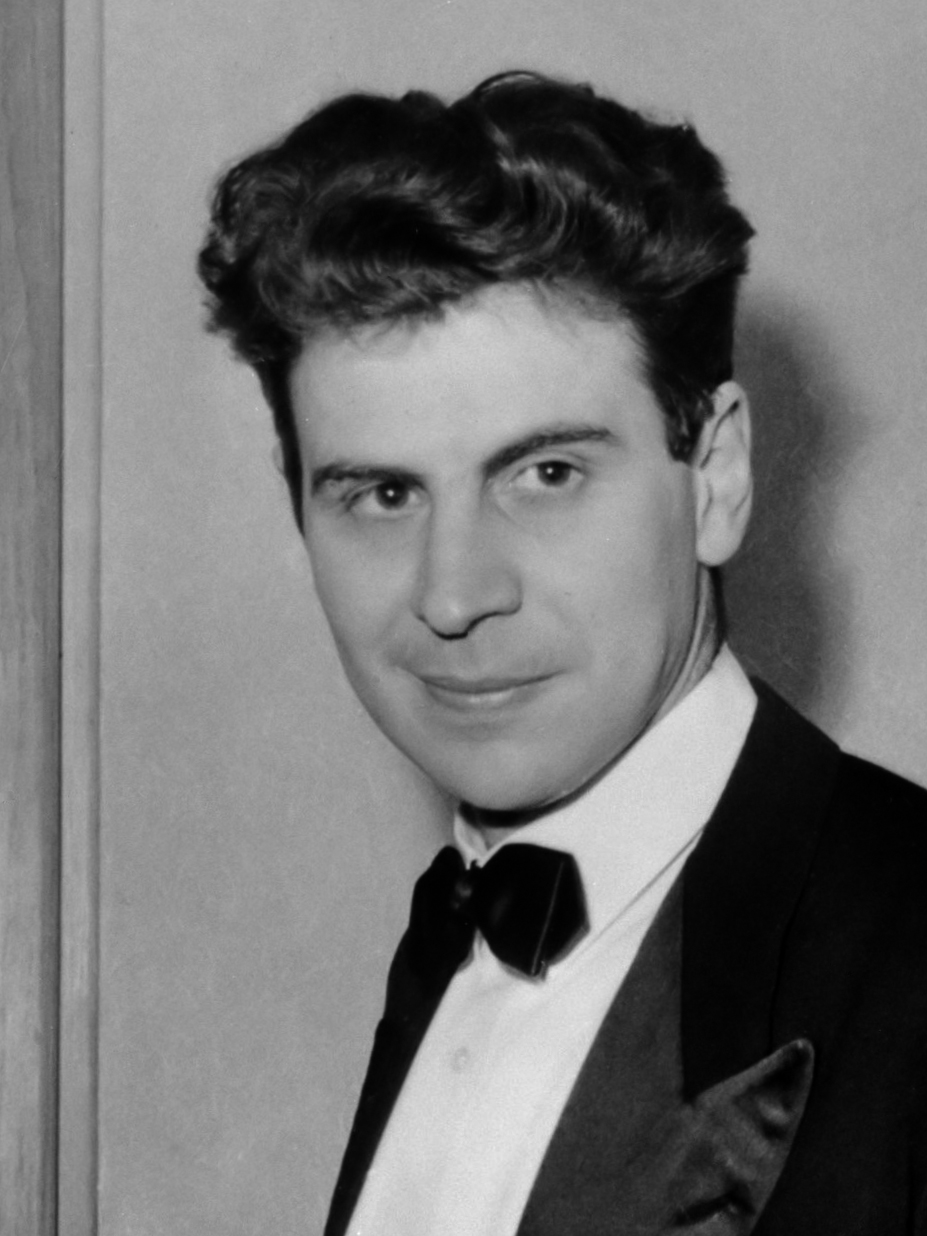
In Paris, 1957

Theodorakis married Myrto Altinoglou on 16 March 1953. The following year, they travelled to Paris, where he entered the Conservatory and studied musical analysis under Olivier Messiaen and conducting under Eugene Bigot.

His symphonic works: a Piano concerto, his first suite, his first symphony, and his scores for the ballet: Greek Carnival, Le Feu aux Poudres, Les Amants de Teruel, received international acclaim. In 1957, he won the Gold Medal in the Moscow Music Festival. In 1959, after the successful performances of Theodorakis's ballet Antigone at Covent Garden in London, the French composer Darius Milhaud proposed him for the American Copley Music Prize – an award of the "William and Noma Copley Foundation", which later changed its name to "Cassandra Foundation" as the "Best European Composer of the Year". His first international scores for the film Ill Met by Moonlight and Honeymoon (aka Luna de Miel), directors: Michael Powell and Emeric Pressburger, were successful: The Honeymoon Song, title song of the later, became part of the repertoire of The Beatles.

== Back to Greek roots ==
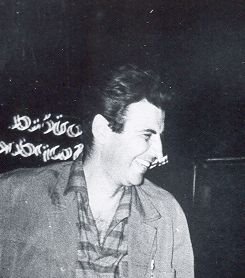
Mikis Theodorakis shortly after his return to Greece in 1961

In 1960, Theodorakis returned to Greece and his roots in Greek music. With his song cycle Epitaphios, he contributed to a cultural revolution in his country. His most significant and influential works are based on Greek and world poetry – Epiphania (Giorgos Seferis), Little Kyklades (Odysseas Elytis), Axion Esti (Elytis), Mauthausen (Iakovos Kambanellis), Romiossini (Yannis Ritsos), and Romancero Gitano (Federico García Lorca) – he attempted to give back to Greek music a dignity which in his perception it had lost. He developed his concept of "metasymphonic music" (symphonic compositions that go beyond the "classical" status and mix symphonic elements with popular songs, Western symphonic orchestra and Greek popular instruments).

He founded the Athens Little Symphony Orchestra and gave many concerts in the country, trying to familiarize people with symphonic music.

After the assassination of Gregoris Lambrakis in May 1963 he founded the Lambrakis Democratic Youth ("Lambrákides") and was elected its president. Under Theodorakis's impetus, it started a vast cultural renaissance movement and became the greatest political organisation in Greece with more than 50,000 members. Following the 1964 elections, Theodorakis became a member of the Greek Parliament, associated with the left-wing party EDA. Because of his political ideas, the composer was black-listed by the cultural establishment; at the time of his biggest artistic glory, a large number of his songs were censored-before-studio or were not allowed on the radio stations.

During 1964, he wrote the music for the Michael Cacoyiannis film Zorba the Greek, whose main theme, since then, exists as a trademark for Greece. It is also known as "Syrtaki dance", inspired by old Cretan traditional dances.

== During the dictatorship ==
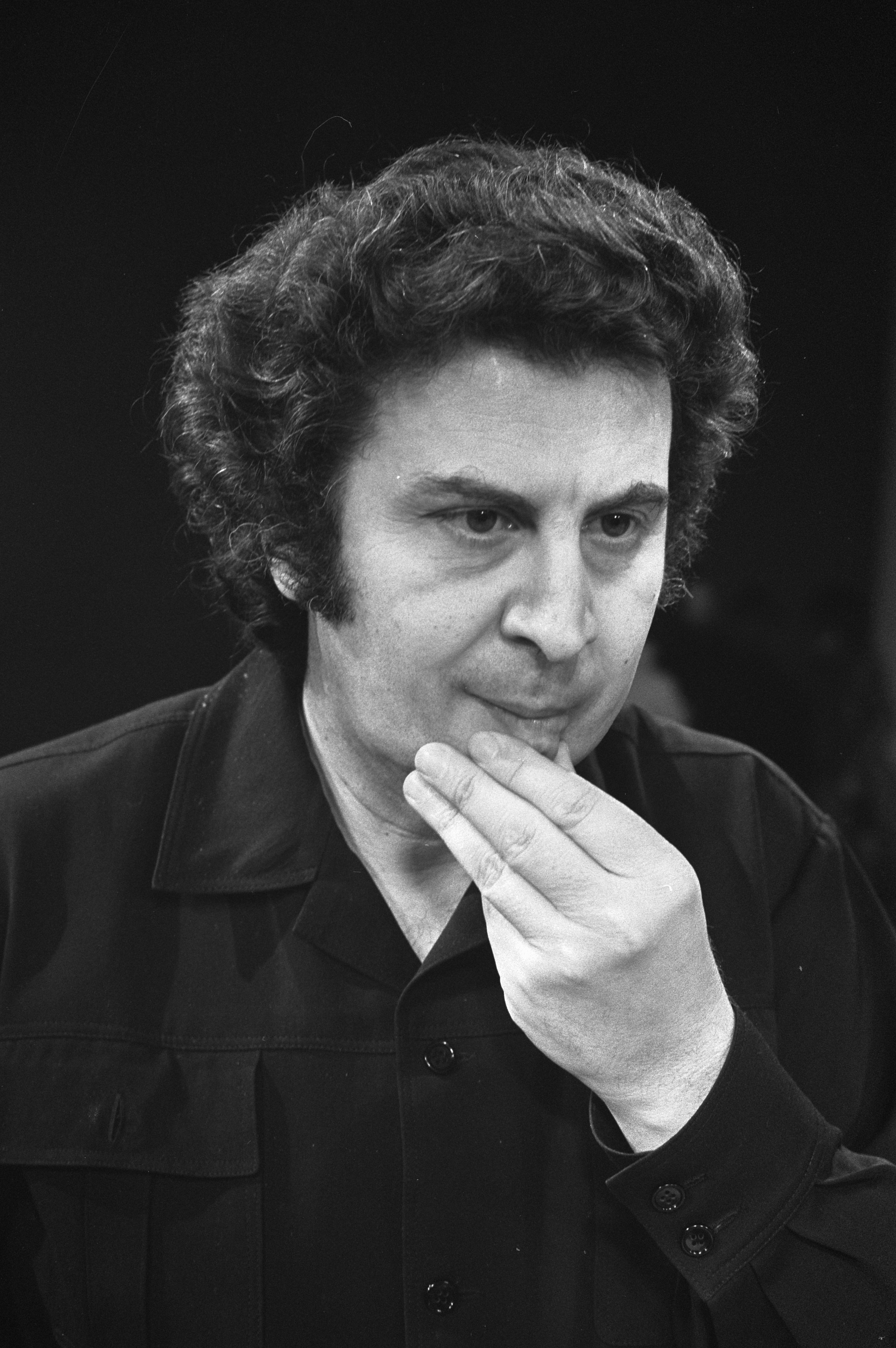
Mikis Theodorakis in 1972

On 21 April 1967 the Regime of the Colonels took power in a putsch. Theodorakis was a symbol of resistance to the military regime. He went into hiding, issued the first call for resistance against the dictatorship on 23 April. and founded the Pan-Hellenic Anti-Dictatorship Front (PAM). On 1 June, the Colonels published "Army decree No 13", which banned playing, and even listening to his music. Theodorakis was arrested on 21 August, and jailed for five months. He was released at the end of January 1968, and then deported in August to Zatouna with his wife, Myrto, and their two children, Margarita and George. Later he was interned in the concentration camp of Oropos.

An international solidarity movement, headed by such personalities as Dmitri Shostakovich, Leonard Bernstein, Arthur Miller, and Harry Belafonte demanded to get Theodorakis freed. On request of the French politician Jean-Jacques Servan-Schreiber, Theodorakis was allowed to go into exile to Paris on 13 April 1970. Theodorakis' flight left secretly from an Onassis-owned private airport outside Athens. He arrived at Le Bourget Airport where he met Costa Gavras, Melina Mercouri and Jules Dassin. Theodorakis was immediately hospitalized with tuberculosis. His wife and children joined him a week later in France, having travelled from Greece via Italy on a boat.

He would compose, alongside Pagani, the anthem of the French Socialist Party, in 1977.

== Resistance in exile ==
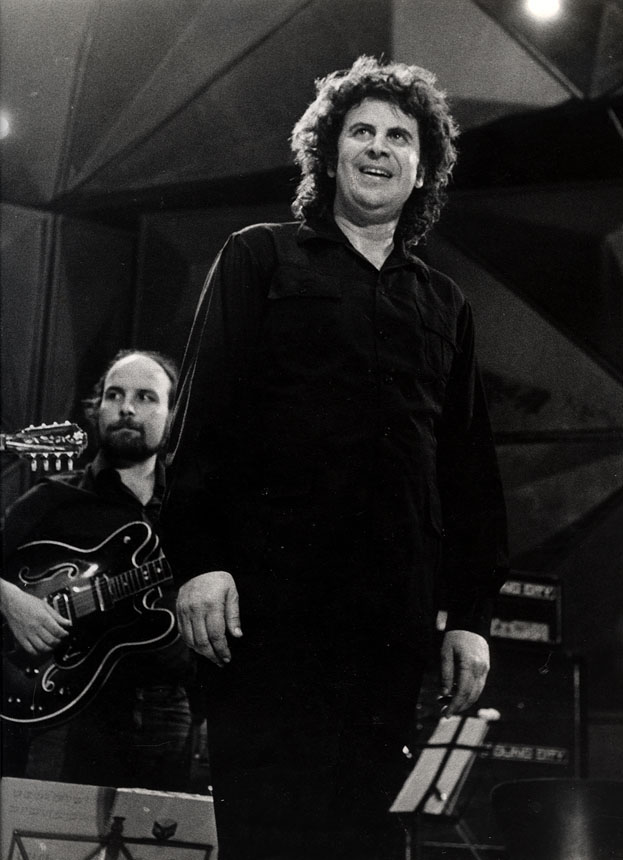
Mikis Theodorakis at a concert in Caesarea, Israel, in the 1970s

In 1971, Mikis Theodorakis was invited to Chile by then-president Salvador Allende. In Valparaíso, he listened to a group of young people who introduced him to part of the work of the poet Pablo Neruda. Theodorakis loved it and promised to give Chile his musical opinion on the Canto General. Back to Paris, in 1972 Theodorakis met Pablo Neruda when the Greek composer was rehearsing the musicalization of Canto General. Neruda was impressed and asked him to include poems such as "Lautaro" and "A Emiliano Zapata".

He was received by Gamal Abdel Nasser and Tito, Yigal Allon and Yasser Arafat, while François Mitterrand, Olof Palme and Willy Brandt became his friends. For millions of people, Theodorakis was the symbol of resistance against the Greek dictatorship together with Melina Mercouri.

== Return to Greece ==
After the fall of the colonels, Mikis Theodorakis returned to Greece on 24 July 1974 to continue his work and his concert tours, both in Greece and abroad. His return was in triumph, with huge crowds and his music playing on the radio. At the same time he participated in public affairs. In 1978, through his article For a United Left Wing, he had "stirred up the Greek political life. His proposal for the unification of the three parties of the former United Left (Greece)—which had grown out of the National Liberation Front—had been accepted by the Greek Communist Party which later proposed him as the candidate for mayor of Athens during the 1978 elections." (Andreas Brandes) He was later elected several times to the Greek Parliament (1981–1986 and 1989–1993) and for two years, from 1990 to 1992, he was a minister in the government of Constantine Mitsotakis. After his resignation as a member of Greek parliament, he was appointed General Musical Director of the Choir and the two Orchestras of the Hellenic State Radio (ERT), which he reorganised and with which he undertook successful concert tours abroad.

He was committed to raising international awareness of human rights, environmental issues, and the need for peace. For this reason, he initiated, along with the Turkish author, musician, singer and filmmaker Zülfü Livaneli, the Greek–Turkish Friendship Society.

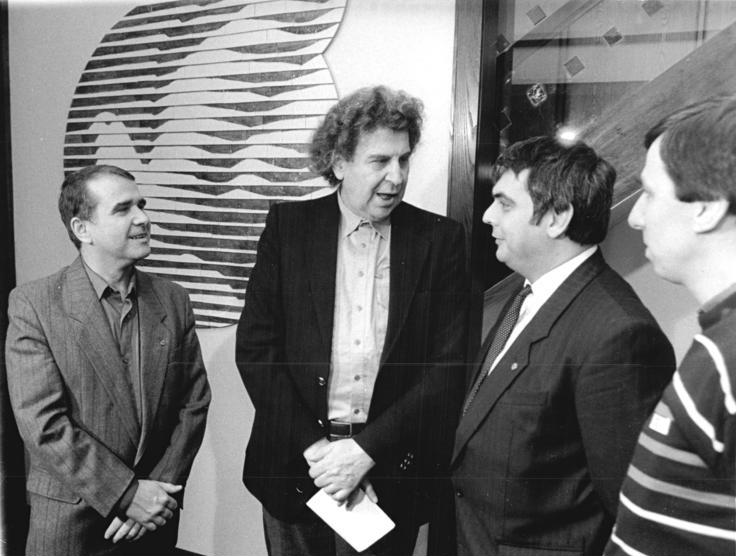
Theodorakis on a visit in East Germany, May 1989

From 1981, Theodorakis had started the fourth period of his musical writing, during which he returned to the symphonic music, while still going on to compose song-cycles. His most significant works written in these years are his Second, Third, Fourth, and Seventh Symphony, most of them being first performed in the former German Democratic Republic between 1982 and 1989. It was during this period that he received the Lenin Peace Prize. He composed his first opera Kostas Kariotakis (The Metamorphoses of Dionysus) and the ballet Zorba the Greek, premièred in the Arena of Verona during the Festival Verona 1988. During this period, he also wrote the five volumes of his autobiography: The Ways of the Archangel (Οι δρόμοι του αρχάγγελου).

In 1989, he started the fifth period, the last, of his musical writing: He composed three operas (lyric tragedies) Medea, first performed in Bilbao (1 October 1991), Elektra, first performed in Luxembourg (2 May 1995) and Antigone, first performed in Athens Concert Hall (7 October 1999). This trilogy was complemented by his last opera Lysistrata, first performed in Athens (14 April 2002): a call for peace... With his operas, and with his song cycles from 1974 to 2006, Theodorakis ushered in the period of his Lyrical Life.

In March 1997, gave a concert at the Berlin Haus der Kulturen der Welt. Afterwards he was hospitalized due to respiratory difficulties and it was when he declared that this was his last concert.

Theodorakis was Doctor honoris causa of several universities.

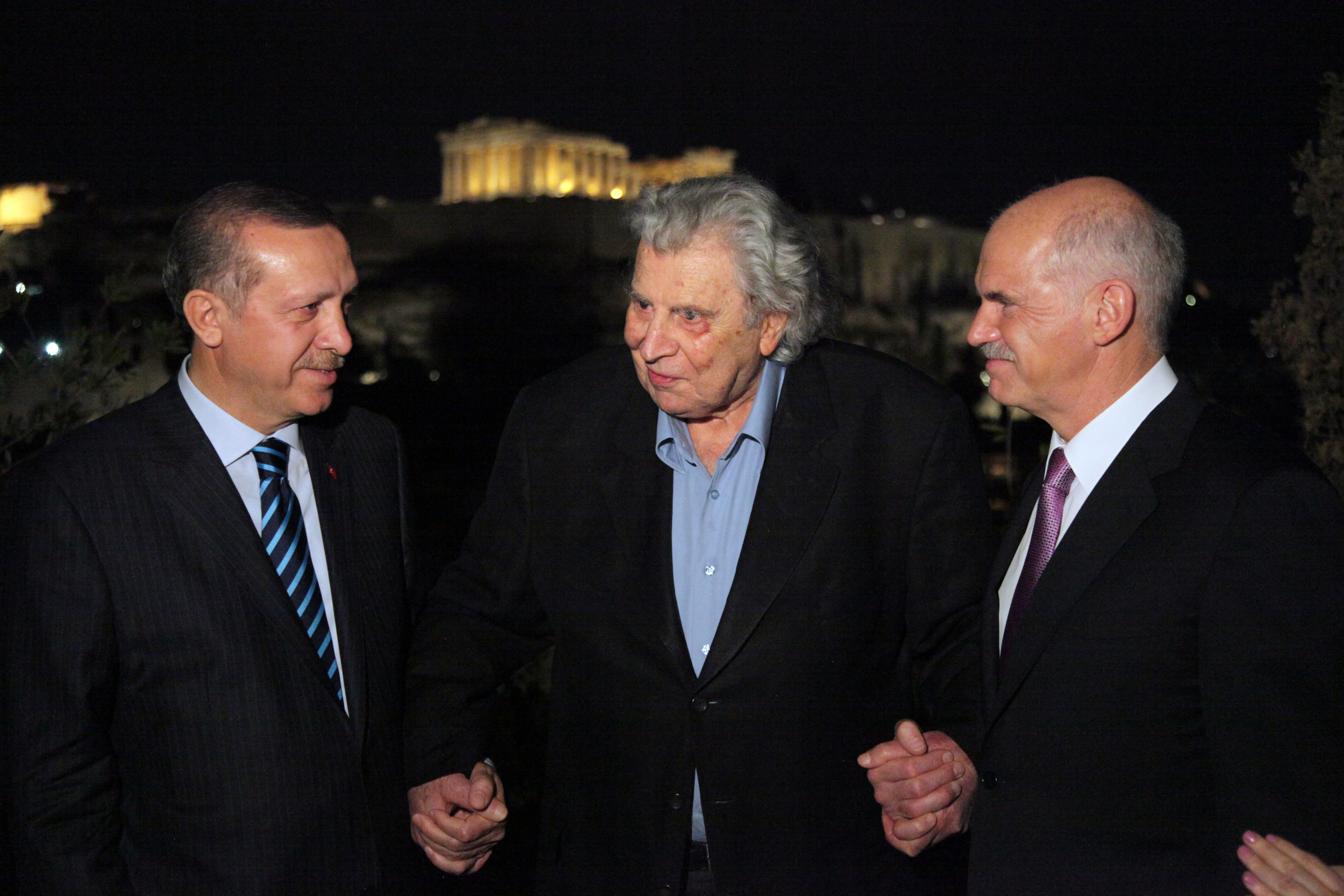
Theodorakis holding hands with Turkish Prime Minister Recep Tayyip Erdoğan and Greek Prime Minister George Papandreou, May 2010

== Later life and death ==
He later lived in retirement, reading, writing, publishing arrangements of his scores, texts about culture and politics. On occasions he took position: in 1999, opposing NATO's Kosovo war and in 2003 against the Iraq War. In 2005, he was awarded the Sorano Friendship and Peace Award, the Russian International St.-Andrew-the-First-Called Prize, the insignia of Grand Officer of the Order of Merit of Luxembourg, and the IMC UNESCO International Music Prize, while already in 2002 he was honoured in Bonn with the Erich Wolfgang Korngold Prize for film music at the International Film Music Biennial in Bonn (cf also: Homepage of the Art and Exhibition Hall Bonn). In 2007, he received a Lifetime Achievement Award at the distribution of the World Soundtrack Awards in Ghent.

A final collection of songs titled Odysseia set poetry by Kostas Kartelias. In 2009 he composed a Rhapsody for Strings (mezzo-soprano or baritone ad lib.). Created on 30 January 2013, this was one of the largest works by any composer of any time.

On 26 February 2019, Theodorakis was hospitalized with heart problems. On 8 March, he underwent surgery for a pacemaker. He died of cardiopulmonary arrest at his home in Athens on 2 September 2021, at the age of 96. The Greek Prime Minister declared three days of national mourning to honour him, and his body lay in state in the chapel of the Metropolitan Cathedral of Athens, with thousands of people, including artists, as well as political leaders from all Greek parties paying their last respects. Epitaphs were delivered by the president of the Hellenic Republic, Aikaterini Sakellaropoulou, and the general secretary of the Communist Party of Greece, Dimitrios Koutsoumbas. Afterwards, according to his will, his body was transferred by boat overnight to be buried in his hometown of Galatas, near Chania, Crete, where his parents and brother Giannis Theodorakis were buried.

== Legacy ==
In 2025, the Greek government declared 2025 the “Year of Mikis Theodorakis” to mark the 100th anniversary of his birth. As part of this, ERTFLIX International launched a tribute with concerts abroad and archives of interviews and rare performances becoming more accessible.

Also in 2025, his childhood home in Galatas, Chania, Crete was officially made a modern monument. The house and adjacent donated properties will be restored with joint funding to become a cultural centre for exhibitions and research.

In September 2025, the Communist Party of Turkey (TKP) and the Communist Party of Greece (KKE) held cross-border centenary concerts titled “Bir Asır Theodorakis”, (Theodorakis for a century) first on Chios and then at İzmir’s Bostanlı Democracy Square. The İzmir concert drew a large audience, where TKP General Secretary Kemal Okuyan and KKE Political Bureau member Nikos Sofianos emphasized Theodorakis’ role as both a patriot and an internationalist. Sofianos highlighted that his music and political life were inseparable, rooted in his early membership in the KKE and lifelong communist identity, while also carrying a message of solidarity across peoples. He noted that Theodorakis’ works, inspired by poets such as Yannis Ritsos, Pablo Neruda, and Nâzım Hikmet, continue to inspire struggles against imperialism and for social justice. Okuyan, in turn, placed Theodorakis among a global tradition of communist artists like Dmitri Shostakovich, Víctor Jara, and Paul Robeson, arguing that his absence would leave a void in twentieth-century culture. The event concluded with Turkish and Greek musicians performing his songs together, including a bilingual rendition of “We Will Not Die Fighting” (Dövüşmeden Ölmeyiz).

== Political views ==
=== Israel and Jews ===
Theodorakis opposed Israel's occupation of Gaza and the West Bank. He criticised Greek Prime Minister George Papandreou for establishing closer relations with Israeli prime minister Benjamin Netanyahu, who was guilty, he said, of "war crimes in Lebanon and Gaza." Theodorakis was a vocal critic of Zionism, and referred to himself as an "anti-Zionist." In 2003, he stated, "Everything that happens today in the world has to do with the Zionists ... American Jews are behind the world economic crisis that has hit Greece as well." He was accused of saying that "this small nation (Israel) is the root of evil". Theodorakis later clarified his comments, stating in a letter to the Central Council of Jews in Greece that what he had said was: "Unfortunately the state of Israel supports the United States and their foreign policy, which is the root of the Evil and, therefore, it is close to the root of the Evil." He was also accused of having admitted his anti-Semitism during an interview on Greek TV on 8 February 2011. His controversial statement on television had been: "I should clarify that I am anti-Semite. Essentially, I love the Jewish people, I love the Jews, I have lived long with them but as much as I hate anti-Semitism, I hate Zionism even more so", being "I am anti-Semite" an obvious slip of the tongue for "anti-Zionist". In 2013, he condemned Golden Dawn for Holocaust denial.

=== Views of the United States ===
Theodorakis was a long-time critic of the United States foreign policy. During the invasion of Iraq, he called Americans "detestable, ruthless cowards and murderers of the people of the world". He said he would consider anyone who interacted with "these barbarians", for whatever reason, as his enemy. Theodorakis greatly opposed the NATO bombing of Yugoslavia during the Yugoslav Wars. He participated in a charity concert protesting the bombing in 1999.

=== 2010–2011: Non-political movement ===
On 1 December 2010, Mikis Theodorakis founded "Spitha: People's Independent Movement", a non-political movement which calls people to gather and express their political ideas. The main goal of "Spitha" is to help Greece stay clear of its economic crisis. On 31 May 2011, Theodorakis gave a speech attended by approximately 10,000 people in the center of Athens, criticising the Greek government for the loan debt it has taken from the International Monetary Fund.

=== Positions on Macedonia ===
In 1997 Mikis Theodorakis stated on the Macedonian issue that "The name does not matter so much, as long as the peoples live in peace". Later, in an interview, he stressed "In fact, this country is being pushed towards improving relations with Greece. So why shouldn't it be possible for our relations to prosper at all levels and whatever comes up? The Customs Union, confederation, etc. are just conditions. In any case, I think that the name issue will be overcome when the relations between the two peoples reach such a point that the name will not matter at all".

Theodorakis was one of the main speakers at the Rally for Macedonia in Athens, which took place on 4 February 2018. In his speech, he stated that "Macedonia is one, was, is and will always be Greek." The statements garnered support from parties in parliament, while even Golden Dawn MPs welcomed Mikis Theodorakis' shift on the name of Macedonia. Members of SYRIZA and Yiannis Boutaris commented negatively on Theodorakis' statements. Also, the day before the rally, a group of anarchists threw paint at the entrance of his house and then wrote threatening messages, such as: "Your story starts from the mountain and ends in the national swamp of Syntagma Square.

== Works ==
His song cycles are based on poems by Greek authors, as well as by García Lorca and Neruda: Epitaphios, Archipelagos, Politia A-D, Epiphania, The Hostage, Mykres Kyklades, Mauthausen, Romiossini, Sun and Time, Songs for Andreas, Mythology, Night of Death, Ta Lyrika, The Quarters of the World, Dionysos, Phaedra, Mia Thalassa, Os Archaios Anemos, Ta Lyrikotera, Ta Lyrikotata, Erimia, Odysseia. Theodorakis released two albums of his songs and song cycles on Paredon Records and Folkways Records in the early seventies, including his Peoples' Music: The Struggles of the Greek People (1974).

=== Symphonic works ===
- 1945: The Apocalypse (Ode to Beethoven)
- 1947: Festival of Asi Gonia
- 1952: Piano Concerto "Helikon"
- 1953: First Symphony ("Proti Simfonia")
- 1954–1959: 3 Orchestral Suites
- 1958: Piano Concerto No 1
- 1981: Symphony No 2 ("The Song of the Earth"; text: Mikis Theodorakis) for children's choir, piano, and orchestra
- 1981: Symphony No 3 (texts: Dionysios Solomos; Constantine P. Cavafy; Byzantine hymns) for soprano, choir, and orchestra
- 1983: Symphony No 7 ("Spring-Symphony"; texts: Yannis Ritsos; Yorgos Kulukis) for four soloists, choir, and orchestra
- 1986–1987: Symphony No 4 ("Of Choirs") for soprano, mezzo, narrator, choir, and symphonic orchestra without strings
- 1995: Rhapsody for Guitar and Orchestra
- 1995: Sinfonietta
- 1996: Rhapsody for Cello and Orchestra
- 2008: Rhapsody for Trumpet and Orchestra (for Piccolo Trumpet, orchestrated by Robert Gulya)
- 2010: "Andalusia" for Mezzo and Orchestra

=== Chamber music ===
- 1942: Sonatina for piano
- 1945: Elegy No 1, for cello and piano
- 1945: Elegy No 2, for violin and piano
- 1946: String Quartet No 1
- 1946: String Quartet No 2 "To Kimiterio"
- 1946: Duetto, for two violins
- 1947: Trio, for violin, cello and piano
- 1947: 11 Preludes, for piano
- 1947: Sexteto, for piano, flute and string quartet
- 1949: Study for two violins and cello
- 1952: Syrtos Chaniotikos, for piano and percussion
- 1952: Sonatina No 1, for violin and piano
- 1955: Little Suite, for piano
- 1955: Passacaglia, for two pianos
- 1959: Sonatina No 2, for violin and piano
- 1989: Choros Assikikos, for violoncello solo
- 1996: Melos, for piano
- 2007: East of the Aegean, for cello and piano

=== Cantatas and oratorios ===
- 1960: Axion Esti (text: Odysseas Elytis)
- 1969: The March of the Spirit (text: Angelos Sikelianos)
- 1971–82: Canto General (text: Pablo Neruda)
- 1981–82: Kata Saddukaion Pathi (Sadducean-Passion; text: Michalis Katsaros) for tenor, baritone, bass, choir and orchestra
- 1982: Liturgy No 2 ("To children, killed in War"); texts: Tassos Livaditis, Mikis Theodorakis) for choir
- 1982–83: Lorca, for voice, solo guitar, choir, and orchestra (based on Romancero Gitano (text: Federico García Lorca, translated by Odysseas Elytis)
- 1992: Canto Olympico, for voice, solo piano, choir, and orchestra (texts: Dimitra Manda, Mikis Theodorakis)
- 1999: Requiem (text: St. John Damascene)
- 2009: tis dikaiosunis hlie nohte

=== Hymns ===
- 1970: Hymn for Nasser
- 1973: Hymn for the Socialist Movement in Venezuela
- 1973: Hymn for the Students. dedicated to the victims of Polytechnical School in Athens (18.11.)
- 1977: Hymn of the French Socialist Party
- 1978: Hymn for Malta
- 1982: Hymn of P.L.O.
- 1991: Hymn of the Mediterranean Games
- 1992: "Hellenism" (A song for the opening ceremony of the 1992 Summer Olympics, later used again during the 2004 Summer Olympics)

=== Ballets ===
- 1953: Carnaval (choreography: Rallou Manou)
- 1958: Le Feu aux Poudres (choreography: Paul Goubé)
- 1958: Les Amants de Teruel (choreography: Milko Šparemblek)
- 1959: Antigone (choreography: John Cranko)
- 1972: Antigone in Jail (choreography: Micha van Hoecke)
- 1979: Elektra (choreography: Serge Kenten)
- 1983: Sept Danses Grecques (choreography: Maurice Béjart)
- 1987–88: Zorba il Greco (choreography: Lorca Massine)

=== Operas ===
- 1984–1985: Kostas Karyotakis (The Metamorphosis of Dionysos)
- 1988–1990: Medea
- 1992–1993: Elektra
- 1995–1996: Antigone
- 1999–2001: Lysistrata

=== Music for the stage ===
==== Classical tragedies ====
- 1959–1960: Phoenician Women (Euripides)
- 1960–1961: Ajax (Sophocles)
- 1965: Trojan Women (Euripides)
- 1966–1967: Lysistrata (Aristophanes)
- 1977: The Suppliants (Aeschylus)
- 1979: The Knights (Aristophanes)
- 1986–1988: Oresteia: Agamemnon, Choephorae, Eumenides (Aeschylus)
- 1987: Hecuba (Euripides)
- 1990: Antigone (Sophocles)
- 1992: Prometheus Bound (Aeschylus)
- 1996: Oedipus Rex (Sophocles)
- 2001: Medea (Euripides)

==== Modern plays ====
- 1960–1961: To Tragoudi tou Nekrou Adelfou (Ballad of the Dead Brother), Musical Tragedy (text: Mikis Theodorakis)
- 1961–1962: Omorphi Poli (Beautiful City), revue (Bost, Dimitris Christodoulou, Christofelis, et al.)
- 1963: I Gitonia ton Angelon (The Quarter of Angels), Music-drama (Iakovos Kambanelis)
- 1963: Magiki Poli (Enchanted City), revue (Mikis Theodorakis, Notis Pergialis, Michalis Katsaros)
- 1971: Antigoni stin Filaki (Antigone in Jail), drama
- 1974: Prodomenos Laos (Betrayed People), music for the theatre (Vangelis Goufas)
- 1975: Echtros Laos (Enemy People), drama (Iakovos Kambanelis)
- 1975: Christophorus Kolumbus, drama (Nikos Kazantzakis)
- 1976: Kapodistrias, drama (Nikos Kazantzakis)
- 1977: O Allos Alexandros ("The Other Alexander"), drama (Margarita Limberaki)
- 1979: Papflessas, play (Spiros Melas)

==== International theatre ====
- 1961: Enas Omiros (The Hostage), drama (Brendan Behan)
- 1963: The Chinese Wall, drama (Max Frisch)
- 1975: Das Sauspiel, tragicomedy (Martin Walser)
- 1979: Caligula, drama (Albert Camus)
- 1978: Polites B' Katigorias (Second-Class Citizens), drama (Brian Friel)
- 1980: Perikles, tragedy, (William Shakespeare)
- 1994: Macbeth, tragedy (William Shakespeare)

=== Principal film scores ===
- 1952–53: Eva (Director: Maria Plyta)
- 1953: The Barefoot Battalion (Director: Gregg G. Tallas)
- 1953: The Golgotha of an Orphan (Director: Dimis Dadiras, Spiros Nikolaidis)
- 1957: Ill Met by Moonlight (Director: Michael Powell)
- 1960: Honeymoon (Director: Michael Powell, Choreography: Léonide Massine)
- 1960: Faces in the Dark (Director: David Eady)
- 1961: Shadow of the Cat (Director: John Gilling)
- 1961: Phaedra (Director: Jules Dassin)
- 1962: The Lovers of Teruel (Director: Raymond Rouleau)
- 1962: Five Miles to Midnight (Director: Anatole Litvak)
- 1962: Electra (Director: Michael Cacoyannis)
- 1964: Zorba the Greek (Director: Michael Cacoyannis)
- 1966: A Bullet Through the Heart (Director: Jean-Daniel Pollet)
- 1967: The Day the Fish Came Out (Director: Michael Cacoyannis)
- 1969: Z (Director: Costa-Gavras)
- 1971: Biribi (Director: Daniel Moosmann)
- 1971: The Trojan Women (Director: Michael Cacoyannis)
- 1972: State of Siege (Director: Costa-Gavras)
- 1973: The Battle of Sutjeska (Director: Stipe Delić)
- 1973: Serpico (Director: Sidney Lumet)
- 1974: The Rehearsal (Director: Jules Dassin)
- 1976: Actas de Marousia (Director: Miguel Littín)
- 1977: Iphigenia (Director: Michael Cacoyannis)
- 1980: The Man with the Carnation (Director: Nikos Tzimas)
- 2013: Recycling Medea (Director: Asteris Kutulas)

== Scores ==
- Rhapsody for Cello and Orchestra
- March of the spirit (Oratorio, Full Score)
- Axion esti (Oratorio Full Score)
- Zorbas Ballet (Suite – Ballet, Full Score)
- Carnaval (Suite – Ballet Full, Score)
- Adagio (Full Score) & Sinfonietta (Full Score)
- Epiphania Averof (Cantata)
- Canto Olympico (Oratorio)
- Les Eluard
- Ο κύκλος
- 20 τραγούδια για πιάνο και αρμόνιο
- Η Βεατρίκη στην οδό Μηδέν
- Μια θάλασσα γεμάτη μουσική
- Τα λυρικώτερα
- Τα λυρικώτατα
- Τα πρόσωπα του Ήλιου
- Φαίδρα (Phaedra)
- Λιποτάκτες
- Θαλασσινά φεγγάρια
- Ασίκικο πουλάκη
- Romancero Gitano (για πιάνο – φωνή)
- Τα Λυρικά
- Ταξίδι μέσα στη νύχτα
- Μικρές Κυκλάδες
- Διόνυσος (Dionysus)
- Επιφάνια (Epiphany)
- Επιτάφιος (Epitaph)
- Μπαλάντες. Κύκλος τραγουδιών για πιάνο και φωνή
- Χαιρετισμοί. Κύκλος τραγουδιών για πιάνο και φωνή
- Ένα όμηρος

== Internationally available CD releases ==
- Mikis Theodorakis & Zülfü Livaneli — Together (Tropical), 1997.
- Mikis Theodorakis — First Symphony & Adagio (Wergo/Schott)
- Mikis Theodorakis — Mikis (Peregrina)
- Mikis Theodorakis — Symphony No. 4 (Wergo/Schott)
- Mikis Theodorakis — Symphony No. 7 (Wergo/Schott)
- Mikis Theodorakis — Requiem: For soloists, choir and symphonic orchestra (Wergo/Schott)
- Mikis Theodorakis — Symphonietta & Etat de Siege (Wergo/Schott)
- Maria Farantouri & Rainer Kirchmann — Sun & Time: Songs by Theodorakis (Lyra)
- Mikis Theodorakis — Mauthausen Trilogy: In Greek, Hebrew and English (Plaene)
- Mikis Theodorakis — Carnaval — Raven (for mezzo and symphonic orchestra) (Wergo/Schott)
- Mikis Theodorakis — Resistance (historic recordings) (Wergo/Schott)
- Mikis Theodorakis — First Songs (Wergo/Schott)
- Mikis Theodorakis — Antigone/Medea/Electra (3-Opera Box) (Wergo/Schott)
- Mikis Theodorakis — The Metamorphosis of Dionysus (Opera) (Wergo/Schott)
- Mikis Theodorakis — Rhapsodies for Cello and Guitar (Wergo/Schott)
- Mikis Theodorakis — East of the Aegean (for cello and piano) (Wergo/Schott)
- Mikis Theodorakis & Francesco Diaz — Timeless (Wormland White)

- Maria Farantouri — Poetica (Songs by Theodorakis) (Peregrina)
- Maria Farantouri — Asmata (Songs by Theodorakis) (Peregrina)
- Irene Papas — Songs of Theodorakis (RCA Records, 1968)

== Written works ==
Books in Greek by Theodorakis:

- Το χρέος (The Debt), ed. Terradia tetradias tis Democracy 1970–1971.
- Μουσική για τις μάζες (Music for the masses), ed. Olkos, 1972.
- Στοιχεία για μια νέα πολιτική» (Elements for new politics), ed. Papazisis, 1972.
- Δημοκρατική και συγκεντρωτική αριστερά (Democratic and centralized left), ed. Papazisis, 1972.
- Οι μνηστήρες της Πηνελόπης (The suitors of Penelope), ed. Papazisis, 1976.
- Περί Τέχνης (On Art), ed. Papazisis, 1976.
- Η αλλαγή. Προβλήματα ενότητας της Αριστεράς (Change. Problems of Unity of the Left), 1978.
- Μαχόμενη Κουλτούρα (Fighting Culture), 1982.
- Για την ελληνική μουσική (For Greek Music), 1983.
- Ανατομία της σύγχρονης μουσικής (Anatomy of Contemporary Music), ed. Synchroni Epochi, 1983.
- Star System, ed. Kaktos, 1984.
- Οι δρόμοι του αρχάγγελου (The Roads of the Archangel), autobiography, ed. Cedros, 1986–1995.
- Ζητείται Αριστερά (The Left is Wanted), ed. Sideris, 1989.
- Αντιμανιφέστο (Antimanefesto), ed. Gnoseis.
- Πού πάμε (Where are we going?), ed. Gνoseis, 1989.
- Ανατομία της Μουσικής (Anatomy of Music), ed. Alpheios, 1990.
- Να μαγευτώ και να μεθύσω (To be enchanted and drunk), ed. Livani, 2000.
- Το μανιφέστο των Λαμπράκηδων (The Lambrakis Manifesto), ed. Helleniki Grammata, 2003.
- The trilogy Πού να βρω την ψυχή μου... (Where to find my soul...), ed. Livani, 2003.
- Μάνου Χατζηδάκι εγκώμιον (Praise of Manos Hadjidakis), ed. Janos, 2004.
- Σπίθα για μια Ελλάδα ανεξάρτητη και δυνατή (Spark for an independent and strong Greece), ed. Janos, 2011.
- Διάλογοι στο λυκόφως-90 συνεντεύξεις (Dialogues in the twilight-90 interviews), ed. Janos, 2016.
- Μονόλογοι στο λυκαυγές (Monologues in the twilight), ed. Janos, 2017.
- "The Dialectics of Harmony (Στη Διαλεκτική της Αρμονίας), co-authored with Kostas Gouliamos, Gutenberg, 1918

=== Poems ===
- Το τραγούδι του νεκρού αδελφού (The Song of the Dead Brother).
- Ο Ήλιος και ο Χρόνος (The Sun and Time).
- Αρκαδία Ι (Arcadia I).
- Αρκαδία VI (Arcadia VI).
- Αρκαδία X (Arcadia X).
- Τραγούδι της γης (Song of the Earth) from Symphony No. 2.

== Awards and decorations ==
- Lenin Peace Prize, USSR (1983).
- Order of the Phoenix, Greece (1995).
- Officer of the Legion of Honour, France (1996).
- Doctor honoris causa of the University of Athens (1996).
- Doctor honoris causa Aristotle University of Thessaloniki (2000).
- "Erich Korngold" prize, Germany (2002).
- Honorary citizen of Novi Sad, Serbia and Montenegro (2004).
- 2005 International Music Prize, UNESCO International Music Council (2005).
- Legion of Honour, France (2007).
- Honorary member of the Academy of Athens (2013).
- Grand Cross of the Order of Honour, Greece (2021).
- A picture of Theodorakis was included in the "In Memoriam" segment of the 94th Academy Awards Ceremony.
- Grand Officer of the Order of Merit of the Grand Duchy of Luxembourg.
- A major road in Thessaloniki, Greece, was renamed to Mikis Theodorakis Avenue in 2025.

== See also ==
- Éntekhno
