= Songs of Theodorakis =

Live album by Irene Papas
- Released: 1968
- Recorded: New York
- Genre: Éntekhno
- Language: Greek
- Label: RCA
- Director: Harry Lemonopoulos
- Producer: Andy Wiswell

Irene Papas chronology
| Songs of Theodorakis (1968) | Odes (1979) |

Songs of Theodorakis is an album by the Greek actress and singer Irene Papas. She sings eleven songs, all in Greek, written by the Greek songwriter and composer Mikis Theodorakis. The album was first issued in 1968 by RCA Victor (FPM-215 and FSP-215). RCA Victor also released it in France in 1969. Anodos released it in Greece (ΠΜΕ Α-166) in 1990 as Ειρήνη Παππά | Σε Ένδεκα Τραγούδια Του Μίκη Θεοδωράκη (Irene Pappas | Eleven Songs by Mikis Theodorakis). It was remastered and reissued on CD in 2004 by FM Records as Irene Papas Sings Mikis Theodorakis. All the tracks in the album were recorded in a concert that Papas gave in New York in 1969. The music was conducted by Harry Lemonopoulos. The album was produced by Andy Wiswell, who also wrote the liner notes. Both Papas and Theodorakis had gone into exile when the military junta came to power in Greece in 1967. The New York Times critic Clive Barnes said of her performance that "Irene Pappas is known to the public as an actress, but that is why she sings with such intensity, her very appearance, with her raven hair, is an equally dynamic means of expression".

== Tracks ==
- 1 At Sunset (Ena deilino), also called Twilight
- 2 Denial (Arnese), also called Secret Shore (To perigiali)
- 3 You Were Good, You Were Sweet (Isoun kalos k'isoun glykos) also called None Like You
- 4 My Betrayed Love (Prodomeni agapi)
- 5 Thanks God (Doxa to theo) also called Bless the Lord
- 6 On Every Corner (Gonia gonia) also called Around Each Corner
- 7 Paul And Nicholas (Ton Pavlo kai ton Nikolo)
- 8 Sorrow (Kaimos), also called Anguish
- 9 In The Orchards (Sta pervolia) also called In the Fields
- 10 The Sun Looked At The Earth (O ilios koitaxe ti ge)
- 11 Lament (Miroloi)
