= Rapsodies =

Studio album by Irene Papas with Vangelis
- Released: 1986
- Recorded: London, 1986
- Studio: Nemo Studios, London
- Genre: Electronica
- Length: 45:49
- Label: Polydor
- Producer: Vangelis

Irene Papas chronology
Odes (1979)	Rapsodies (1986)	Irene Pappas Sings Mikis Theodorakis (2006)

Vangelis chronology
Invisible Connections (1986)	Rapsodies (1986)	Direct (1988)

Professional ratings
Review scores
Source	Rating
Record Collector	3/5 stars

Rapsodies (Greek: Ραψωδίες) is an album of Greek songs by Irene Papas and Vangelis, featuring music and text based on (or inspired by) Greek Orthodox liturgical chant, with two tracks composed by Vangelis. Recorded in Nemo studios, London 1986 (the last year he used that studio), the entirety of the album is performed and produced by Vangelis with Irene Papas' lead vocals. First issue of the album on compact disc was in Greece only (Polydor 829413). A remastered edition was released by Universal Music in 2007.

== Track listing ==
1. "To My Champion and Commander" (Gr: Τη Υπερμάχω Στρατηγώ) - 6:51
2. "Oh, My Sweet Springtime" (Gr: Ω! Γλυκύ Μου Έαρ) - 8:41
3. "I See Your Bridal Chamber All Bedecked" (Gr: Τον Νυμφώνα Σου Βλέπω) - 1:36
4. "Rhapsody" (Gr: Ραψωδία) (Original Composition) - 5:25
5. "The Beauty of Your Virginity and The Splendor of Your Purity" (Gr: Την Ωραιότητα Της Παρθενίας Σου) - 4:41
6. "Resurrection" (Gr: Χριστός Ανέστη) - 7:23
7. "Song of Songs" (Gr: Άσμα Ασμάτων) (Original Composition) - 11:12
- Tracks 4 & 7 composed by Vangelis
- Track 7 translation of Solomon's poem by Lefteris Papadopoulous

== Notes ==
The initial album release on CD and LP had a lot of clipping and distortion. The Philips CD eliminates some of this, whilst the 2007 remaster, overseen by Vangelis himself, eradicates it altogether.

"To My Champion and Commander" was composed by the patriarch of Constantinople to commemorate the legendary appearance of the Virgin Mary during a siege of the city in the 7th century.

"Oh, My Sweet Springtime" is a lament of the Virgin Mary upon seeing the body of her dead son, Jesus and is often sung the Friday before Easter.

"I See Your Bridal Chamber All Bedecked" is taken from the parable of two sets of virgins, the foolish ones who used up all the oil in their lamps early in the evening and the wise ones who waited until the groom came, that relates to the second coming.

"Rhapsody" is an original instrumental composition by Vangelis.

"The Beauty of Your Virginity and The Splendor of Your Purity" is something the angel Gabriel said to the Virgin Mary, though the statement is incomplete.

"Resurrection" is an Easter hymn, based on αληθώς ανέστη (alithós anésti, Truly he is risen). This song is sung on Easter Sunday, and for the Eastern Orthodox Paschal season.

"Song of Songs" is a poetic, modern Greek translation of a portion of the Song of Solomon, set to an original composition by Vangelis.
