= Slaves in Their Bonds (film) =

Slaves in Their Bonds Σκλάβοι στα δεσμά τους
- Directed by: Adonis Lykouresis
- Starring: Giannis Fertis; Dimitra Matsouka; Akis Sakellariou; Christos Loulis; Eirini Inglesi
- Cinematography: Peter Salapatas
- Edited by: Georgios Triantafyllou
- Music by: Minos Matsas
- Release date: 21 November 2008 (TIFF)
- Running time: 127 minutes
- Country: Greece
- Language: Greek

Slaves in Their Bonds (Greek: Οι σκλάβοι στα δεσμά τους) is a 2008 Greek drama film directed by based on the eponymous novel by Konstantinos Theotokis. It was Greece's submission to the 82nd Academy Awards for the Academy Award for Best Foreign Language Film, but was not accepted as a nominee.

== Cast ==
- Giannis Fertis as Alexandros Ophiomachus
- Dimitra Matsouka as Aimilia Valsami
- Akis Sakellariou as Aristeidis Steriotis
- Christos Loulis as Giorgis Ophiomachus
- Eirini Inglesi as Maria Ophiomachus
- Rynio Kyriazi as Evlalia Ophiomachus
- Konstantinos Papachronis as Alkis Sozomenos.
- Lena Papaligoura as Luiza Ophiomachus
- Giorgos Spanias as Spyros Ophiomachus

== Awards ==
winner:

- 2008: Greek State Film Awards for best director (Adonis Lykouresis)
- 2008: Greek State Film Awards for best screenplay (Adonis Lykouresis, Yannis Maroudas, Maria Vardaka)
- 2008: Greek State Film Awards for best actor (Giannis Fertis)
- 2008: Greek State Film Awards for best supporting actor (Christos Loulis)
- 2008: Greek State Film Awards for best supporting actress (Dimitra Matsouka)
- 2008: Greek State Film Awards for best music (Minos Matsas)
- 2008: Greek State Film Awards for best sound
- 2008: Greek State Film Awards for best set decoration
- 2008: Greek State Film Awards for best film (second place)
- 2008: Greek State Film Awards for Best Make up
