= Slaves in Their Bonds (novel) =

1922 novel by Konstantinos Theotokis

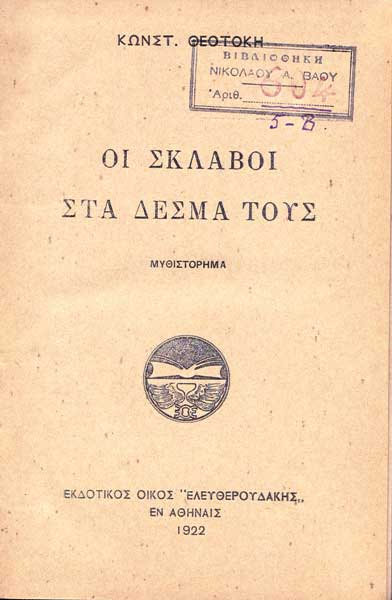
- Cover page of the first edition
- Author: Konstantinos Theotokis
- Language: Greek
- Genre: Novel
- Publication date: 1922

Slaves in Their Bonds or Slaves in Their Chains (Greek:Σκλάβοι στα δεσμά τους) is a novel of Konstantinos Theotokis, written in 1922. It was Theotokis's last novel. The novel was adapted for cinema in 2008, directed by Adonis Lykouresis. It also adapted for TV in 1981, but the TV series was never broadcast because the Panhellenic Socialist Movement gained power in Greece that same year.

== Plot ==
The story takes place in Corfu at the beginning of 20th century. The head of the decadent, aristocratic family of Ophiomachus forced to marry his daughter to the successful doctor and candidate deputy Aristeidis Steriotis, in order to deal with their financial difficulties. However his daughter is in love with the young scholar Alkis Sozomenos. Ultimately their expectations are not fulfilled.
