= Yannis Maroudas =

Yannis Maroudas is a Greek author, screenwriter and lecturer at the School of Film Studies, Aristotle University of Thessaloniki Greece. He studied History, Cinematography, Cultural Management (MA) and is currently researching audiovisual culture, New media and film history. He has been steadily working as a professional scriptwriter for television and cinema since 1989. In 2008, he won the National Award for Best Screenwriting in the movie Sklavoi Sta Desma Tous (Slaves To Fate).

Also, he has been a member of the Board of the Scriptwriters' Guild of Greece since 2007.

== TV works ==
(as a scriptwriter)

- Parakamptirios (Detour), dramatic serial, 26 episodes, director: P. Michail, ET1 channel, 1991
- Xoris Makiyaz (Without Make-Up), dramatic teleplay, director: D. Mayroeidis, ANT1 channel, 1993
- Tolmires Istories (Spicy Stories), erotic TV series, 4 episodes, directors: D. Arvanitis, Th. Antoniou, ANT1, 1994-‘95
- Magiki Nichta (Night of Magic), mystery TV series, 2 episodes, director: D. Arvanitis, ET1 channel, 1995
- Vodka Portokali (Screw Driver), weekly TV sitcom, 33 episodes, director: V. Thomopoulos, ANT1, 2001-‘02
- Mexri Tris Einai Desmos, Eight (8) teleplays (comedies), 60΄ duration, ALTER channel, directors: Th. Antoniou, B. Spanos, 2004-‘05
- Safe Sex, weekly TV teleplays, 7 episodes, directors: K. Athanasiou, P. Fafoutis, MEGA channel, 2007

== Film screenwriting ==
- O Elkystis (The Attractor), short film, director: M. Galanakis, production: G.F.C., Aigokeros SA, 1997
- H Ptosi (The Fall), short film, director: M. Galanakis, production: ET1 channel, Aigokeros SA, 1999
- Sklavoi Sta Desma Tous (Slaves to Fate), feature film, screen adaptation form the homonymous K. Theotokis’ novel, director: T. Lykouressis, production: G.F.C., 2008
- Dying for the Truth, (as a script adaptor), director: Nikos Megrelis, production: Οdeon & Faliro House Productions, CL Productions, Film In Mind Productions, co-production: Ε.Κ.Κ., Ε.Ρ.Τ, Neo Minima, 2011

== Theatrical Plays ==
- Fones Paidion (Children's Voices), 1996 (2nd national prize for young writer)

== Books ==
- Scribola, short stories, Oxy publ., 1999
  ISBN 9789607614841
- I Mystiki Diathiki Tis Pinelopis Gavoyanni (The Secret Will of Penelope Gavoyannis), novel, Oceanida publ., 2008
  ISBN 978-960-410-518-2
