= The Trojan Women (film) =

1971 historical drama film

- Promotional poster
- Directed by: Michael Cacoyannis
- Screenplay by: Michael Cacoyannis
- Based on: The Trojan Women by Euripides; Edith Hamilton (English translation)
- Produced by: Michael Cacoyannis; Anis Nohra; Josef Shaftel
- Starring: Katharine Hepburn; Vanessa Redgrave; Geneviève Bujold; Irene Papas; Patrick Magee; Brian Blessed
- Cinematography: Alfio Contini
- Edited by: Michael Cacoyannis
- Music by: Mikis Theodorakis
- Production company: Josef Shaftel Productions Inc.
- Distributed by: Cinerama Releasing Corporation
- Release date: September 27, 1971
- Running time: 105 minutes
- Countries: United States; United Kingdom; Greece
- Language: English

The Trojan Women (Greek: Τρωάδες) is a 1971 American-British-Greek historical drama film directed by Michael Cacoyannis and starring Katharine Hepburn, Vanessa Redgrave, Geneviève Bujold and Irene Papas. The film was made with the minimum of changes to Edith Hamilton's translation of Euripides' original play, save for the omission of deities, as Cacoyannis said they were "hard to film and make realistic".

== Plot ==
The Trojan Women was one of a trilogy of plays dealing with the suffering created by the Trojan Wars. Hecuba, Queen of the Trojans and mother of Hector, one of Troy's greatest warriors, looks upon the remains of her kingdom as she and the other women await the summons that will send them into slavery to different Greek masters. Cassandra, Hecuba's daughter and former priestess of Apollo who has been driven insane by the ravages of war, waits to see if King Agamemnon will take her into concubinage. Andromache, widow of the slain Hector and mother of his son Astyanax, believes that she must raise her son in the war's aftermath; however, Talthybius, the herald of the Greeks, comes to the ruined city and tells them that King Agamemnon and his brother Menelaus have decreed that Hector's son Astyanax - the last of the male royalty of Troy — must die to ensure the extinction of the line; and Helen of Troy waits to see if she will live or die at the hands of her former husband Menelaus.

== Cast ==
- Katharine Hepburn as Hecuba, Queen of The Trojans
- Vanessa Redgrave as Andromache, Widow of Hector
- Geneviève Bujold as Cassandra, Hecuba's Daughter
- Irene Papas as Helen of Troy
- Brian Blessed as Talthybius
- Patrick Magee as Menelaus, King of Sparta

== Production ==
When filming began in the Spanish village of Atienza, 80 miles northeast of Madrid, sections of the press were speculating that there might be fireworks between the lead actresses. Hepburn had recently gone on record deploring the moral squalor and carelessness of the modern generation, and the impulsive and radical Redgrave was thought by some of the press to be a symbol of that "sloppy" generation. In fact, the actresses got on well, talking about painting, politics, and acting —Hepburn expressed enthusiasm for Redgrave's 1966 Rosalind in As You Like It— and both actresses began to learn Spanish.

Cacoyannis first staged The Trojan Women in Italy in 1963, with Rod Steiger, Claire Bloom, and Mildred Dunnock in the leading roles. Later in the same year, he took the production to New York, and in 1965, to Paris. "For me", he said in a 1971 magazine interview, "the play is particularly pertinent and real. What the play is saying is as important today as it was when it was written. I feel very strongly about war, militarism, killing people ... and I haven't found a better writer who makes that point more clearly than Euripides. The play is about the folly of war, the folly of people killing others and forgetting that they are going to die themselves."

Katharine Hepburn's costume was designed by Nicholas Georgiadis of Covent Garden. Cacoyannis hand-picked Italy's Franco Freda and Adalgisa Favella as make-up artist and hair stylist, respectively, for the film. Both were veterans of the films of Federico Fellini, Michelangelo Antonioni, and Luchino Visconti.

Hepburn said of her acting for this part: "My acting has always been a little flamboyant and rococo. But for this part, I've had to pare right down to the bare essentials." Her acting voice dropped, after special training, by an octave, and was almost accentless; the familiar twanging pitch and East Coast rhythms almost vanished.

== Reception ==
Critic for The New Yorker, Pauline Kael, wrote that although the film had flaws, they were unimportant compared to the fact the it was a film of "one of the supreme works of theater" further writing that the performers brought an "intensity of life to the screen."

== Awards ==
Kansas City Film Critics Circle

- Kansas City Film Critics Circle Award for Best Actress - Katharine Hepburn (won)

National Board of Review of Motion Pictures

- NBR Award for Best Actress - Irene Papas (won)

== See also ==
- List of American films of 1971
- List of historical drama films
- Greek mythology in popular culture
