= CST Award for Best Artist-Technician =

Technical award bestowed at Cannes Film Festival

- CST Award for Best Artist-Technician
- Awarded for: The work of a technician for his collaboration to the creation of a film
- Location: Cannes
- Country: France
- Presented by: CST
- First award: 2003 (1951)
- Website: https://prix.cst.fr/en/

The CST Award for Best Artist-Technician (French: PRIX CST de l’Artiste Technicien) is an independent film award created in 2003. It rewards the work of a technician for his or her collaboration in the creation of a film from the official selection of the Cannes Film Festival. It is awarded by a special jury, appointed by the Superior Technical Commission of Image and Sound (French: Commission Supérieure Technique de l’Image et du Son or CST).

== History ==
In 1951, the CST created the Technical Grand Prize (French: Grand Prix Technique) of the CST, awarded during the Cannes Film Festival. That prize existed until 2000.

In 2003, Pierre-William Glenn, president of the CST, struggled to once again have a prize awarded to a technician during the Cannes Film Festival. Thus, the Vulcan Award of the Technical Artist was born as a part of the festival roster and approved by the festival's president Gilles Jacob.

In 2019, it was renamed the « CST Award for Best Artist-Technician ».

Since 2021, the CST has also been awarding the CST Award for Best Young Female Film Technician, to highlight a young female head of station in French cinema.

== The trophy ==
The actual trophy is awarded to the winner in Paris, during a special evening following the festival.

It is inspired by an image from Jean-Luc Godard's movie Le Mépris (Contempt) (1963) and represents a movie camera with analog and numeric elements.

== Award winners ==
=== CST Award for Best Artist-Technician (since 2019) ===
Year	Awarded Artist(s)	Work Awarded	Film	Director(s)
2019	Flora Volpelière	Editing	Les Misérables	Ladj Ly
2019	Julien Poupard	Cinematography	Les Misérables	Ladj Ly
2021	Vladislav Opelyants	Cinematography	Petrov's Flu	Kirill Serebrennikov
2022	Andreas Franck, Bent Holm, Jacob Ilgner and Jonas Rudels	Sound Crew	Triangle of Sadness	Ruben Ostlund
2023	Johnnie Burn	Sound Design	The Zone of Interest	Jonathan Glazer
2024	Daria D'Antonio	Cinematography	Parthenope	Paolo Sorrentino
2025	Ruben Impens	Cinematography	Alpha	Julia Ducournau
2025	Stephane Thiébaut	Sound Design	Alpha	Julia Ducournau
2026	Nicolas Rumpl	Editing	A Man of His Time	Emmanuel Marre

=== Vulcan Award (2003–2018) ===
Year	Awarded Artist(s)	Work Awarded	Film	Director(s)
2003	Tom Stern	Cinematography	Mystic River	Clint Eastwood
2004	Eric Gautier	Cinematography	Clean	Olivier Assayas
2004	Eric Gautier	Cinematography	The Motorcycle Diaries	Walter Salles
2005	Leslie Shatz	Sound design	Last Days	Gus Van Sant
2005	Robert Rodriguez	Visual processing	Sin City	Robert Rodriguez
2006	Stephen Mirrione	Editing	Babel	Alejandro González Iñárritu
2007	Janusz Kamiński	Cinematography	The Diving Bell and the Butterfly	Julian Schnabel
2008	Luca Bigazzi	Cinematography	Il Divo	Paolo Sorrentino
2008	Angelo Raguseo	Sound mixing	Il Divo	Paolo Sorrentino
2009	Aïtor Berenguer	Sound mixing	Map of the Sounds of Tokyo	Isabel Coixet
2010	Jon Taylor and Bob Beemer	Sound mixing	Biutiful	Alejandro González Iñárritu
2011	José Luis Alcaine	Cinematography	The Skin I Live In	Pedro Almodóvar
2012	Charlotte Bruus Christensen	Cinematography	The Hunt	Thomas Vinterberg
2013	Antoine Heberlé	Cinematography	GriGris	Mahamat Saleh Haroun
2014	Dick Pope	Cinematography	Mr. Turner	Mike Leigh
2015	Tamás Zányi	Sound design	Son of Saul	László Nemes
2016	Ryu Seong-hie	Art direction	The Handmaiden	Park Chan-wook
2017	Josefin Åsberg	Set decoration	The Square	Ruben Östlund
2018	Shin Jeom-hee	Art direction	Burning	Lee Chang-dong

=== Technical Grand Prize (1951–2000) ===
Year	Film	Awarded Artist(s)	Director(s)
2002	No award		
2001	No award (Note: No award given. However, a special Prix du Jury à un technicien was awarded to Tu Duu-chih for Millennium Mambo and What Time Is It There?)		
2000	In the Mood for Love	Christopher Doyle, Ping Bin Lee, William Chang	Wong Kar-wai
1999	The Emperor and the Assassin	Tu Juhua	Chen Kaige
1998	Tango	Vittorio Storaro	Carlos Saura
1997	She's So Lovely	Thierry Arbogast	Nick Cassavetes
1997	The Fifth Element	Thierry Arbogast	Luc Besson
1996	Microcosmos	Whole technical team	Claude Nuridsany, Marie Pérennou
1995	Shanghai Triad	Lü Yue, Olivier Chiavassa, Bruno Patin	Zhang Yimou
1994	Dead Tired	Pitof	Michel Blanc
1993	Mazeppa	Jean Gargonne, Vincent Arnadi	Bartabas
1992	El Viaje	Fernando Solanas	Fernando Solanas
1991	Europa	Lars von Trier	Lars von Trier
1990	Cyrano de Bergerac	Pierre Lhomme	Jean-Paul Rappeneau
1989	Black Rain		Shōhei Imamura
1988	Bird		Clint Eastwood
1987	Le Cinéma dans les Yeux		Gilles and Laurent Jacob
1986	The Mission		Roland Joffé
1985	Insignificance		Nicolas Roeg
1984	The Element of Crime		Lars von Trier
1983	Carmen		Carlos Saura
1982	Passion		Jean-Luc Godard
1981	Les Uns et les Autres		Claude Lelouch
1980	The Risk of Living		Gérald Calderon
1979	Norma Rae		Martin Ritt
1978	Pretty Baby		Louis Malle
1977	Car Wash		Michael Schultz
1976	Fang and Claw		Michel Fano
1975	A Touch of Zen		King Hu
1975	Don't		Robin Lehman
1974	Mahler		Ken Russell
1973	Cries and Whispers		Ingmar Bergman
1972	Zikkaron		Laurent Coderre
1971	The Hellstrom Chronicle		Walon Green, Ed Spiegel
1970	The Territory of Others		François Bel, Michel Fano
1969	No award		
1968	The festival was interrupted. No awards this year.		
1967	Sky Over Holland		John Fernhout
1966	Chimes at Midnight		Orson Welles
1966	Skaterdater		Noel Black
1966	A Man and a Woman	Pierre Uytterhoeven	Claude Lelouch
1965	Ban ye ji jiao		Yeou Lei
1965	Circus Angel		Albert Lamorisse
1965	Une Danse Éternelle		Tamás Banovich
1965	Overture		János Vadászd
1964	No award		
1963	Yachting		Hattum Hoving
1963	Codine		Henri Colpi
1963	The Cassandra Cat		Vojtěch Jasný
1962	Electra		Michael Cacoyannis
1962	Oczekiwanie		Witold Giersz
1962	The Lovers of Teruel		Raymond Rouleau
1962	Les Dieux du Feu		Henri Storck
1962	The Magnificent Concubine		Han Hsiang Li
1961	No award		
1960	Paw		Astrid Henning-Jensen
1959	Luna de Miel		Michael Powell
1959	A Midsummer Night's Dream		Jiří Trnka
1959	Araya		Margot Benacerraf
1958	The Flute and the Arrow		Arne Sucksdorff
1958	Mon Oncle		Jacques Tati
1958	The Cranes are Flying		Mikhail Kalatozov
1957	Wiesensommer		Heinz Sielmann
1957	Toute la mémoire du monde		Alain Resnais
1957	Il Sogno dei Gonzaga		Antonio Petrucci
1957	Bölcsők		Ágoston Kollányi
1957	The Bachelor Party		Delbert Mann
1956	Sob o Céu da Bahia		Ernesto Remani
1956	Tovarichtch Oukhodit v More		Nikita Kurikhin
1956	Crne Vode		Rudolf Sremec
1955	No award		
1954	The Great Adventure		Arne Sucksdorff
1954	Nouveaux Horizons		Marcel Ichac
1954	The Great Warrior Skanderbeg		Sergei Yutkevich
1954	Toot, Whistle, Plunk and Boom		Ward Kimball, Charles A. Nichols
1953	Green Magic		Gian Gaspare Napolitano
1953	La Montagna di Cenere		Giovanni Paolucci
1953	Pescatori di Laguna		Antonio Petrucci
1953	Water Birds		Ben Sharpsteen
1952	The Immortal Song		V. Shantaram
1951	The Tales of Hoffmann		Michael Powell, Emeric Pressburger
1951	Carnet de plongée		Jacques-Yves Cousteau

== Sources ==
- (in French) Award Winners list on the CST Website
