= 1962 Cannes Film Festival =

- Official poster of the 15th Cannes Film Festival, an original illustration by A.M. Rodicq.
- Opening film: Les Amants de Teruel
- Location: Cannes, France
- Founded: 1946
- Awards: Palme d'Or: O Pagador de Promessas
- No. of films: 35 (In Competition)
- Festival date: 7 May 1962 – 23 May 1962
- Website: festival-cannes.com/en

Cannes Film Festival
- 1963 1961

The 15th Cannes Film Festival took place from 7 to 23 May 1962. Japanese writer and diplomat Tetsurō Furukaki served as jury president for the main competition.

The Palme d'Or went to the O Pagador de Promessas (Keeper of Promises) by Anselmo Duarte.

During the Cannes Film Festival of 1961, Robert Favre le Bret, artistic director of the Cannes Film Festival, with the agreement of the French Union of Film Critics, had decided to establish the International Critics' Week during the next Festival. In 1962, this parallel section of the Festival took place for the first time. Its goal was to showcase first and second works by directors from all over the world, not succumbing to commercial tendencies.

The festival opened with The Lovers of Teruel by Raymond Rouleau.

== Juries ==
=== Main Competition ===
- Tetsurō Furukaki, Japanese writer and diplomat - Jury President
- Henry Deutschmeister, French - Jury Vice President
- Sophie Desmarets, French actress
- Jean Dutourd, French writer
- Mel Ferrer, American actor, filmmaker and producer
- Romain Gary, French writer and diplomat
- Jerzy Kawalerowicz, Polish filmmaker
- Ernst Krüger, West-German
- Yuli Raizman, Soviet filmmaker
- Mario Soldati, Italian writer
- François Truffaut, French filmmaker

=== Short Films Competition ===
- Charles Ford, French author and film historian - Jury President
- Charles Duvanel, Swiss
- Derek Prouse, British
- Georges Rouquier, French actor
- Andréas Winding, French cinematographer

== Official selection ==
=== In Competition ===
The following feature films competed for the Palme d'Or:

English title	Original title	Director(s)	Production country
Adorable Julia	Julia, Du bist zauberhaft	Alfred Weidenmann	Austria
Advise & Consent		Otto Preminger	United States
All Fall Down		John Frankenheimer	United States
Âmes et rythmes		Abdelaziz Ramdani	Morocco
And Love Has Vanished	Dvoje	Aleksandar Petrović	Yugoslavia
A Bomb Was Stolen	S-a furat o bombă	Ion Popescu-Gopo	Romania
The Bread of Those Early Years	Das Brot der frühen Jahre	Herbert Vesely	West Germany
Captive Flock	Пленено ято	Ducho Mundrov	Bulgaria
Children of the Sun	Les Enfants du soleil	Jacques Séverac	Morocco
Cléo from 5 to 7	Cléo de 5 à 7	Agnès Varda	France, Italy
Devi		Satyajit Ray	India
Divorce Italian Style	Divorzio all'italiana	Pietro Germi	Italy
L'Eclisse		Michelangelo Antonioni	Italy, France
Elektra	Ηλέκτρα	Michael Cacoyannis	Greece
The Exterminating Angel	El ángel exterminador	Luis Buñuel	Mexico
The Female: Seventy Times Seven	Setenta veces siete	Leopoldo Torre Nilsson	Argentina
Foundry Town	キューポラのある街	Kirio Urayama	Japan
Harry and the Butler	Harry og kammertjeneren	Bent Christensen	Denmark
The Impossible Goodbye	Dom bez okien	Stanisław Jędryka	Poland
In the Steps of Buddha		Pragnasoma Hettiarachi	Sri Lanka
The Innocents		Jack Clayton	United Kingdom, United States
Joseph the Dreamer	בעל החלומות	Alina Gross and Yoram Gross	Israel
Keeper of Promises	O Pagador de Promessas	Anselmo Duarte	Brazil
Konga Yo		Yves Allégret	France
Liberté I		Yves Ciampi	France, Senegal
Long Day's Journey Into Night		Sidney Lumet	United States
The Lovers of Teruel	Les Amants de Teruel	Raymond Rouleau	France
The Magnificent Concubine	楊貴妃	Li Han-hsiang	Hong Kong
The Man from the First Century	Muž z prvního století	Oldřich Lipský	Czechoslovakia
Mondo Cane		Gualtiero Jacopetti, Paolo Cavara and Franco Prosperi	Italy
Plácido		Luis García Berlanga	Spain
The Small Stranger	الغريب الصغير	Georges Nasser	Lebanon
A Taste of Honey		Tony Richardson	United Kingdom
The Trial of Joan of Arc	Procès de Jeanne d'Arc	Robert Bresson	France
When the Trees Were Tall	Когда деревья были большими	Lev Kulidzhanov	Soviet Union

=== Out of Competition ===
The following films were selected to be screened out of competition:

English title	Original title	Director(s)	Production country
Boccaccio '70		Vittorio De Sica, Luchino Visconti, Mario Monicelli and Federico Fellini	Italy, France
Le Crime ne paie pas		Gérard Oury	France, Italy

=== Short film competition ===
The following short films competed for the Short Film Palme d'Or:

- Akheytzi by Lada Boyadjieva
- Anarkali, My Beautiful by Jean-Claude See
- Big City Blues by Charles Huguenot Van Der Linden
- Bolshie nepriyatnosti by Vladimir Brumberg & Zinaida Brumberg
- Certosa di pavia by Carlo Ludovico Ragghianti
- Clovek pod vodou by Jiří Brdečka
- Couro de gato by Joaquim Pedro de Andrade
- Danza Espanola by Juan Gyenes
- Faces by Edward McConnell
- Image Of The Sea by Richard Alan Gray
- An Occurrence at Owl Creek Bridge (La Rivière du Hibou) by Robert Enrico
- Le Hampi by Claude Jutra, Roger Morilliere, Jean Rouch
- Les Dieux du feu by Henri Storck
- Les quatre saisons by Niklaus Gessner
- Ljubav I Film by Ivo Vrbanic
- Oczekiwanie by Witold Giersz & Ludwik Perski
- Pan by Herman van der Horst
- Rodolphe Bresdin by Nelly Kaplan
- Roma momenti in Jazz by Enzo Battaglia
- Saguenay by Chris Chapman
- Szenvedely by Jozsef Nepp
- Tagebuch eines Reporters by Manfred Durniok
- Teeth Is Money by Jean Delire & Eddy Ryssack
- The Australian Landscape Painters by Richard Mason
- The Sound of Speed by Bruce Kessler
- Voronet by Ion Bostan
- Zambesi by Raymond Hancock

== Parallel section ==
=== International Critics' Week ===
The following feature films were selected to be screened for the 1st International Critics' Week (1e Semaine de la Critique):

- Adieu Philippine by Jacques Rozier (France)
- Alias Big Shot (Alias Gardelito) by Lautaro Murúa (Argentina)
- Bad Boys (Furyō shōnen) by Susumu Hani (Japan)
- The Living Camera: Mooney vs. Fowle by Claude Fournier, Richard Leacock, James Lipscomb, Abbot Mills, D. A. Pennebaker, William Ray (United States)
- Les Inconnus de la terre by Mario Ruspoli (France)
- I nuovi angeli by Ugo Gregoretti (Italy)
- Les Oliviers de la justice by James Blue (France)
- Strangers in the City by Rick Carrier (United States)
- All Souls' Day (Zaduszki) by Tadeusz Konwicki (Poland)
- Tres veces Ana by David José Kohon (Argentina)

== Official Awards ==
=== Main Competition ===
- Palme d'Or: O Pagador de Promessas by Anselmo Duarte
- Jury Special Prize:
  - L'Eclisse by Michelangelo Antonioni
  - The Trial of Joan of Arc by Robert Bresson
- Best Actress:
  - Katharine Hepburn for Long Day's Journey Into Night
  - Rita Tushingham for A Taste of Honey
- Best Actor:
  - Dean Stockwell, Jason Robards and Ralph Richardson for Long Day's Journey Into Night
  - Murray Melvin for A Taste of Honey
- Best Cinematic Transposition: Elektra by Michael Cacoyannis
- Best Comedy: Divorce, Italian Style by Pietro Germi

=== Short Films Competition ===
- Short Film Palme d'Or: An Occurrence at Owl Creek Bridge by Robert Enrico
- Prix spécial du Jury: Oczekiwanie by Witold Giersz & Ludwik Perski
- Short film Technical Prize:
  - Les Dieux du feu by Henri Storck
  - Oczekiwanie by Witold Giersz & Ludwik Perski
  - Pan by Herman van der Horst

== Independent awards ==
=== FIPRESCI Prize ===
- The Exterminating Angel by Luis Buñuel

=== Commission Supérieure Technique ===
- Technical Grand Prize:
  - The Lovers of Teruel by Raymond Rouleau
  - Elektra by Michael Cacoyannis
  - The Magnificent Concubine by Li Han Hsiang

=== OCIC Award ===
- The Trial of Joan of Arc by Robert Bresson

== Media ==
- British Pathé: Cannes Film Festival 1962 footage
- British Pathé: Cannes Film Festival 1962 Awards
- INA: Opening of the 1962 festival (commentary in French)
- INA: Atmosphere at the 1962 Cannes Festival (commentary in French)
- INA: List of winners of the 1962 Cannes Festival (commentary in French)
