= The Wonders of Aladdin =

- US film poster
- Directed by: Henry Levin; Mario Bava
- Screenplay by: Luther Davis
- Story by: Stefano Strucchi; Duccio Tessari; Adaptation: Silvano Reina; Franco Prosperi; Pierre Véry
- Based on: Aladdin and the Magic Lamp from One Thousand and One Nights Les mille et une nuits by Antoine Galland
- Produced by: Joseph E. Levine; Massimo Patrizi
- Starring: Donald O'Connor; Noëlle Adam; Vittorio De Sica; Michèle Mercier
- Cinematography: Tonino Delli Colli
- Edited by: Italian version: Maurizio Lucidi; English version: Gene Ruggiero
- Music by: Angelo Lavagnino
- Color process: Eastmancolor
- Production companies: Embassy International Pictures; Lux Film; Lux Compagnie Cinématographique de France
- Distributed by: Lux Flm (Italy and France); Metro-Goldwyn-Mayer (International)
- Release dates: October 31, 1961 (Italy); December 13, 1961 (U.S.); February 21, 1962 (France)
- Running time: 99 minutes (Italy); 93 minutes (US)
- Countries: Italy; France; United States
- Languages: Italian; English
- Budget: $1.75 million
- Box office: £157 million (Italy)

The Wonders of Aladdin (Italian: Le meraviglie di Aladino) is a 1961 Italian-French-American adventure comedy fantasy film directed by Henry Levin (with second unit direction by Mario Bava—uncredited in U.S. prints but credited as sole director in Italy) and produced by Joseph E. Levine for Metro-Goldwyn-Mayer. The film stars Donald O'Connor as the title character.

== Cast ==
- Donald O'Connor as Aladdin
- Nöelle Adam as Djalma
- Vittorio De Sica as Geni
- Aldo Fabrizi as Sultan
- Michèle Mercier as Princess Zaiha
- Milton Reid as Omar
- Mario Girotti as Prince Moluk
- Fausto Tozzi as Grand Vizier
- Marco Tulli as Fakir
- Giovanna Galletti as Midwife
- Adriana Facchetti as Benhai, Aladdin's mother
- Raymond Bussières as Magician
- Alberto Farnese as Bandit leader
- Franco Ressel as Head of the guards

== Production ==
O'Connor signed to make the film in October 1960. O'Connor said "The story of Aladdin has been done by everyone but this is its first time around as a comedy." The Wonders of Aladdin was produced in tandem with two Steve Reeves vehicles, Morgan, the Pirate and The Thief of Baghdad, with producer Joseph E. Levine, set designer Flavio Mogherini, cinematographer Tonino Delli Colli and special effects artist Mario Bava working on all three films; Levine packaged and sold their worldwide distribution rights to MGM.

=== Shooting ===
The film was shot in location in Tunisia with studio work in Rome. Filming started 12 December 1960. The Tunisian government were keen to attract filmmakers to the region and provided much assistance, including the loan of their army as soldiers.

According to camera operator Marcello Gatti, Henry Levin directed "80%" of The Wonders of Aladdin, while Bava's on-set contributions consisted of second unit direction and supervising the film's special effects. Because Bava was also in charge of the film's post-production process in Italy, such as its dubbing, Italian and French prints use the credit "A film by Henry Levin, directed by Mario Bava". English language prints only credit Levin with direction.

In his audio commentary for the Blu-ray release of the film by Kino Lorber, Bava biographer Tim Lucas notes that the use of a mosque as a shooting location caused a violent revolt that led to the killing of five people, followed by the killing of a security guard at the American embassy that had cleared the location for the shoot. According to Lucas, Bava had numerous spears pointed at his head during the attack, which he considered the most frightening moment in his life.

While filming in Tunisia in December, O'Connor suffered a blood hemorrhage on this throat and had to be rushed to hospital.

Vittorio De Sica played a small role. It only took a week but the actor said it was "very tiring because of the tricks."

In January, three Americans on the film - O'Connor, Levin and writer Henry Motofsky - accidentally crossed the Tunisian border into Algeria 20 miles south of Tozeur while scouting locations in the Sahara Desert and were arrested. They were held for three hours then returned to the film unit. Filming finished in March 1961.

"From now on I'll do nothing but drawing room comedies," said O'Connor, "and the only location I'm going on is in my backyard".

== Reception ==
=== Critical reception ===
AllMovie, while not particularly favorable toward the film, called it "a fun movie".

=== Box office ===
According to MGM records, the film made a loss of $276,000.
