= 1963 Cannes Film Festival =

- Official poster of the 16th Cannes Film Festival, an original illustration by Jean-Denis Maillart.
- Opening film: The Birds
- Location: Cannes, France
- Founded: 1946
- Awards: Palme d'Or: The Leopard
- No. of films: 26 (In Competition)
- Festival date: 9 May 1963 – 23 May 1963
- Website: festival-cannes.com/en

Cannes Film Festival
- 1964 1962

The 16th Cannes Film Festival took place from 9 to 23 May 1963. French writer Armand Salacrou served as jury president for the main competition.

The Palme d'Or was awarded to The Leopard by Luchino Visconti.

The festival opened with The Birds by Alfred Hitchcock.

== Juries ==
=== Main Competition ===
- Armand Salacrou, French writer - Jury President
- Rouben Mamoulian, American filmmaker and theatre director - Jury Vice President
- Jacqueline Audry, French filmmaker
- Wilfrid Baumgartner, French BDF official
- François Chavane, French producer and writer
- Jean de Baroncelli, French film critic
- Robert Hossein, French actor
- Kashiko Kawakita, Japanese producer
- Steven Pallos, British producer
- Gian Luigi Rondi, Italian writer
- Rostislav Yurenev, Soviet film critic

=== Short Films Competition ===
- Henri Alekan, French cinematographer - Jury President
- Robert Alla, French
- Karl Schedereit, West-German
- Ahmed Sefrioui, Moroccan writer
- Semih Tugrul, Turkish journalist

== Official selection ==
=== In Competition ===
The following feature films competed for the Palme d'Or:

| English title | Original title | Director(s) | Production country |
|---|---|---|---|
| Les Abysses | | Nikos Papatakis | France |
| Alvorada - Brazil's Changing Face | Alvorada – Aufbruch in Brasilien | Hugo Niebeling | West Germany |
| The Cage | La Cage | Robert Darène | France |
| Carom Shots | Carambolages | Marcel Bluwal | France |
| The Cassandra Cat | Až přijde kocour | Vojtěch Jasný | Czechoslovakia |
| Codine | | Henri Colpi | France, Romania |
| The Conjugal Bed | L'ape regina | Marco Ferreri | Italy |
| A Cozy Cottage | Kertes házak utcája | Tamás Fejér | Hungary |
| Empress Wu Tse-Tien | 武則天 | Li Han-hsiang | Hong Kong |
| The Fiances | I Fidanzati | Ermanno Olmi | Italy |
| For Those Who Will Follow | Pour la suite du monde | Pierre Perrault and Michel Brault | Canada |
| Glory Sky | Ouranos | Takis Kanellopoulos | Greece |
| The Good Love | El Buen amor | Francisco Regueiro | Spain |
| Harakiri | 切腹 | Masaki Kobayashi | Japan |
| How to Be Loved | Jak być kochaną | Wojciech Has | Poland |
| The Leopard | Il Gattopardo | Luchino Visconti | Italy, France |
| Like Two Drops of Water | Als twee druppels water | Fons Rademakers | Netherlands |
| Lord of the Flies | | Peter Brook | United Kingdom |
| Optimistic Tragedy | Оптимистическая трагедия | Samson Samsonov | Soviet Union |
| El Otro Cristóbal | | Armand Gatti | Cuba |
| Rat Trap | Le Rat d'Amérique | Jean-Gabriel Albicocco | France |
| This Sporting Life | | Lindsay Anderson | United Kingdom |
| To Kill a Mockingbird | | Robert Mulligan | United States |
| Tobacco | Тютюн | Nikola Korabov | Bulgaria |
| The Venerable Ones | Los Venerables todos | Manuel Antín | Argentina |
| What Ever Happened to Baby Jane? | | Robert Aldrich | United States |

=== Out of Competition ===
The following films were selected to be screened out of competition:

| English title | Original title | Director(s) | Production country |
|---|---|---|---|
| 8½ | Otto e mezzo | Federico Fellini | Italy, France |
| The Birds (opening film) | | Alfred Hitchcock | United States |

=== Short film competition ===
The following short films competed for the Short Film Palme d'Or:

- A fleur d'eau by Alex Seiler
- Bouket zvezdi by Radka Batchvarova
- Citizens Of Tomorrow by Jamie Uys
- The Critic by Ernest Pintoff
- Das Grabmal des Kaisers by Istvan V. Szots
- Di Domenica by Luigi Bazzoni
- La ferriera abbandonata by Aglauco Casadio
- Geel by Costia de Renesse
- Geschwindigkeit by Edgar Reitz
- Le Haricot by Edmond Sechan
- Images du ciel - Égypte o Égypte by Jacques Brissot
- The King's Breakfast by Wendy Toye
- My Flat (Moj stan) by Zvonimir Berkovic
- Nakymaton Kasi by Veronica Leo
- Oslo by Jørgen Roos
- Playa Insolita by Javier Aguirre
- Un Prince Belge de l'Europe, Charles Joseph de Ligne by Jacques Kupissonoff
- Sous le signe de Neptune by A.F. Sulk
- The Ride by Gerald Potterton
- You by Istvan Szabo
- Zeilen by Hattum Hoving
- Zeleznicari by Evald Schorm

== Parallel section ==
=== International Critics' Week ===
The following feature films were selected to be screened for the 2nd International Critics' Week (2e Semaine de la Critique):

- Alone or with Others (Seul ou avec d’autres) by Denys Arcand, Denis Héroux, Stéphane Venne (Canada)
- Barnvagnen by Bo Widerberg (Sweden)
- Déjà s'envole la fleur maigre by Paul Meyer (Belgium)
- Hallelujah the Hills by Adolfas Mekas (United States)
- Le Joli Mai by Chris Marker, Pierre Lhomme (France)
- Pelle viva by Giuseppe Fina (Italy)
- Pitfall (Otoshiana) by Hiroshi Teshigahara (Japan)
- Porto das Caixas by Paulo César Saraceni (Brazil)
- Showman by Albert Maysles, David Maysles (United States)
- The Sun in a Net (Slnko v sieti) by Štefan Uher (Czechoslovakia)

== Official Awards ==
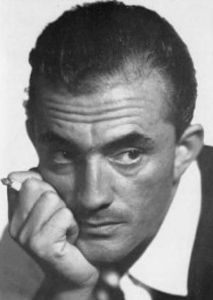
Luchino Visconti, winner of the Palme d'Or

=== Main Competition ===
- Palme d'Or: The Leopard by Luchino Visconti
- Jury Special Prize:
  - The Cassandra Cat by Vojtěch Jasný
  - Harakiri by Masaki Kobayashi
- Best Screenplay: Dumitru Carabat, Henri Colpi and Yves Jamiaque for Codine
- Best Actress: Marina Vlady for The Conjugal Bed
- Best Actor: Richard Harris for This Sporting Life

=== Short Films Competition ===
- Short Film Palme d'Or:
  - Le Haricot by Edmond Séchan
  - In wechselndem Gefälle (A fleur d'eau) by Alexander J. Seiler
- Jury Prize - Short Film: Moj Stan by Zvonimir Berković
  - Special Mention: Di Domenica by Luigi Bazzoni & You by István Szabó
- Short Film Technical Prize: Zeilen by Hattum Hoving

== Independent Awards ==
=== FIPRESCI Prize ===
- This Sporting Life by Lindsay Anderson (In competition)
- Le Joli Mai by Chris Marker, Pierre Lhomme (International Critics' Week)

=== Commission Supérieure Technique ===
- Technical Grand Prize:
  - The Cassandra Cat by Vojtěch Jasný
  - Codine by Henri Colpi

=== OCIC Award ===
- The Fiances by Ermanno Olmi

=== Other awards ===
- Gary Cooper Award: To Kill a Mockingbird by Robert Mulligan
- Best Evocation of a World-Shattering Epic: Optimistic Tragedy by Samson Samsonov

== Media ==
- British Pathé: Cannes Film Festival 1963 footage
- British Pathé: Cannes Film Festival 1963 Awards
- INA: Opening of the 1963 festival (commentary in French)
- INA: List of award-winners at the 1963 festival (commentary in French)
