= Good Love =

Good Love may refer to:

- The Good Love, a 1963 Spanish film

== Music ==
- Good Love (Meli'sa Morgan album) or the title song, 1987
- Good Love (EP) or the title song, by The Maine, 2011

=== Songs ===
- "Good Love" (City Girls song)
- "Good Love" (Klymaxx song)
- "Good Love" (Sheek Louch song)
- "Good Love", by Aly & AJ from Ten Years
- "Good Love", by Anita Baker from Giving You the Best That I Got
- "Good Love", by Bat for Lashes from Two Suns
- "Good Love", by Bic Runga from Belle
- "Good Love", by Isaac Hayes from South Park: Bigger, Longer & Uncut
- "Good Love", by Mary J. Blige featuring T.I. from Stronger with Each Tear
- "Good Love", by Poison from Open Up and Say... Ahh!
- "Good Love", by Prince from Crystal Ball
- "Good Love", by TLC from 3D
- "Good Lovin'", by The Young Rascals
