= Joseph E. Levine =

American film producer

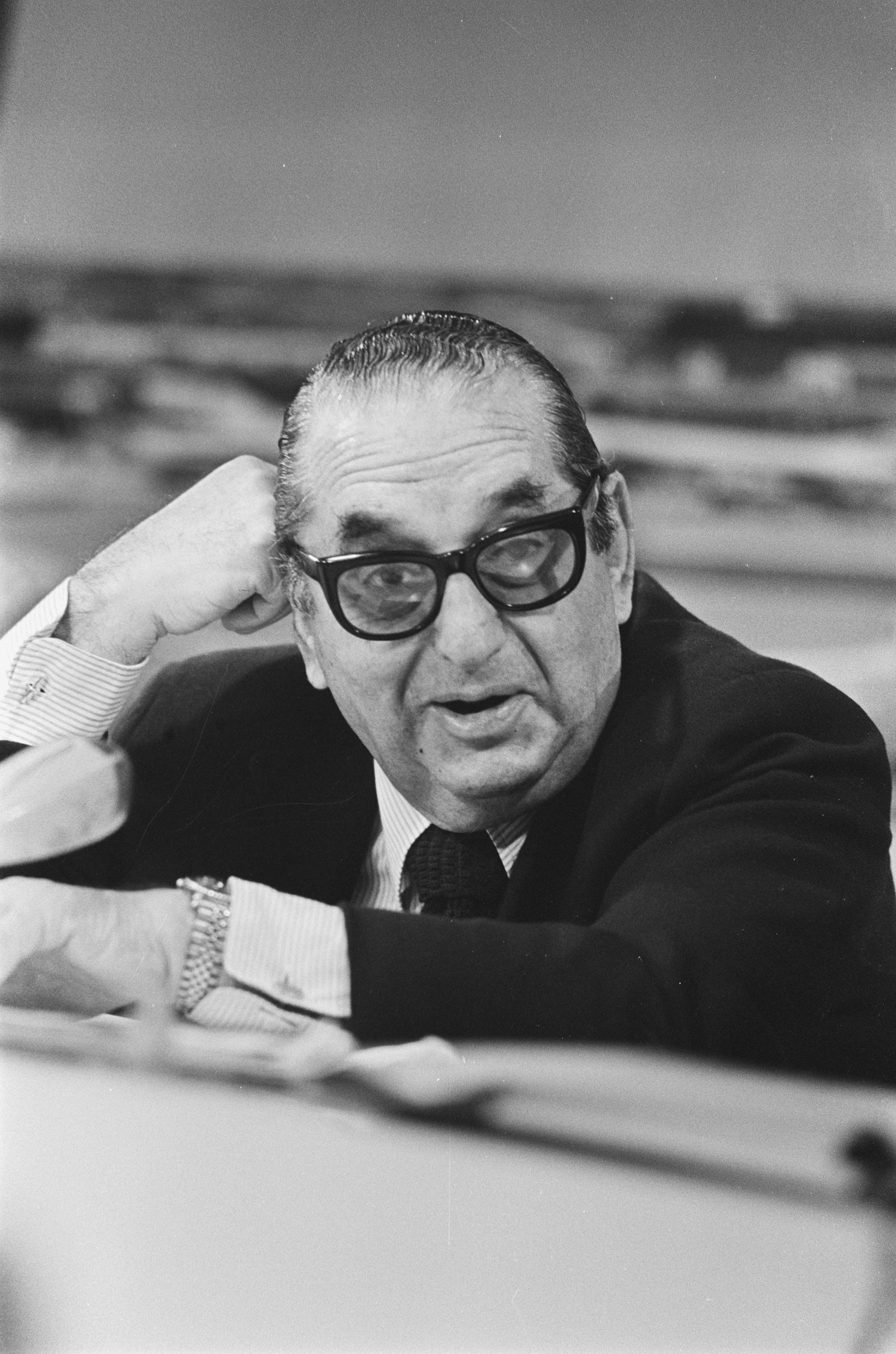
- Levine in 1976
- Born: Joseph Edward Levine; September 9, 1905; Boston, Massachusetts, U.S.
- Died: July 31, 1987 (aged 81); Greenwich, Connecticut, U.S.
- Occupations: Producer, film distributor
- Years active: 1937–1987
- Known for: Embassy Pictures
- Spouse: Rosalie Harriet Harrison (m. 1938)
- Children: 2

Joseph Edward Levine (September 9, 1905 – July 31, 1987) was an American film distributor, financier and producer. At the time of his death, it was said he was involved in one or another capacity with 497 films. Levine was responsible for the American releases of Godzilla, King of the Monsters!, Attila and Hercules, which helped revolutionize American film marketing, and was founder and president of Embassy Pictures.

Levine's biggest hit was director Mike Nichols' The Graduate (1967), a blockbuster hit that was considered, then and now, a watershed film that inaugurated the New Hollywood and made Dustin Hoffman a superstar. At the time of its release, The Graduate became one of the Top Ten All-Time Box Office hits. With the great success of the film, Levine sold his company to the conglomerate Avco, though he continued on as the CEO of the renamed Avco-Embassy film production division.

Other films produced and/or financed by Levine included Two Women (1960), Contempt (1963), The 10th Victim (1965), Marriage Italian Style (1964), The Lion in Winter (1968), The Producers (1968), Carnal Knowledge (1971) and The Night Porter (1974). After leaving Avco-Embassy, he became an independent again, producing A Bridge Too Far (1977).

== Biography ==
=== Early life ===
Levine was born in a slum in Boston, Massachusetts, on September 9, 1905. The youngest of six children of a Russian-Jewish immigrant tailor, Joe did whatever work he could to help support his mother, a widow who had remarried only to have her second husband abandon her. This led Joe (in his later years) to tell an interviewer that he had known (in his words) "not one happy day" growing up. At 14 years of age he was hired for full-time work in a dress factory and left school, never to re-enroll.

In the 1920s, in partnership with two of his older brothers, Joe opened a basement dress shop, whose stock the Levine brothers obtained on consignment. He had multiple other jobs and operated the Cafe Wonderbar in Boston's Back Bay during this period and during the early and mid-1930s.

=== Marriage and distribution career ===
In 1937, Levine encountered Rosalie Harrison, then a singer with Rudy Vallee's band, and left the restaurant business for her; within a week of their engagement, at Harrison's insistence, Levine sold the Cafe Wonderbar. They married the following year and moved to New Haven, Connecticut, where Joe bought, and commenced to run, a movie theater. Eventually, he became a successful, if small-time, distributor and exhibitor throughout New England, buying "decrepit" Westerns at low rates for his theaters, which eventually totalled seven, including three drive-ins.

One of Levine's most unusual successes was Body Beautiful, a sex-hygiene film which he saw drawing a line of prospective ticket-buyers who were braving a snowstorm to that end. He later remembered buying it to show in his theaters because "it made me sick." He was also a representative for Burstyn-Mayer distributing Italian films such as Roberto Rossellini's Rome, Open City (1945) and Paisà (1946), and Vittorio De Sica's Bicycle Thieves (1948).

The Second World War inspired Levine to promote the film Ravaged Earth, which had been shot in China, with pro-American, anti-Japanese rhetoric. Renting the Shubert Theater in his native Boston, he spent large sums of money on film advertisements that he wrote himself; the wording reflected then-prevailing anti-Japanese sentiments of the war era. Nan Robertson's obituary of Levine quotes one of the slogans as reading: "Jap Rats Stop at Nothing – See This. It Will Make You Fighting Mad."

During the 1950s, he became an area sub-distributor for newly-formed American International Pictures. In 1956, Levine bought the Australian film Walk Into Paradise; after it generated low box-office revenue, he retitled the film Walk Into Hell, which brought box-office success. Levine discovered that double features with overlapping cast members or similar titles generated higher box-office revenue; he began the practice of screening two films with similar titles on one bill.

In the 1960s he built two cinemas on 57th Street in New York City – the Lincoln Art Theatre and the Festival Theatre.

=== Producing career ===
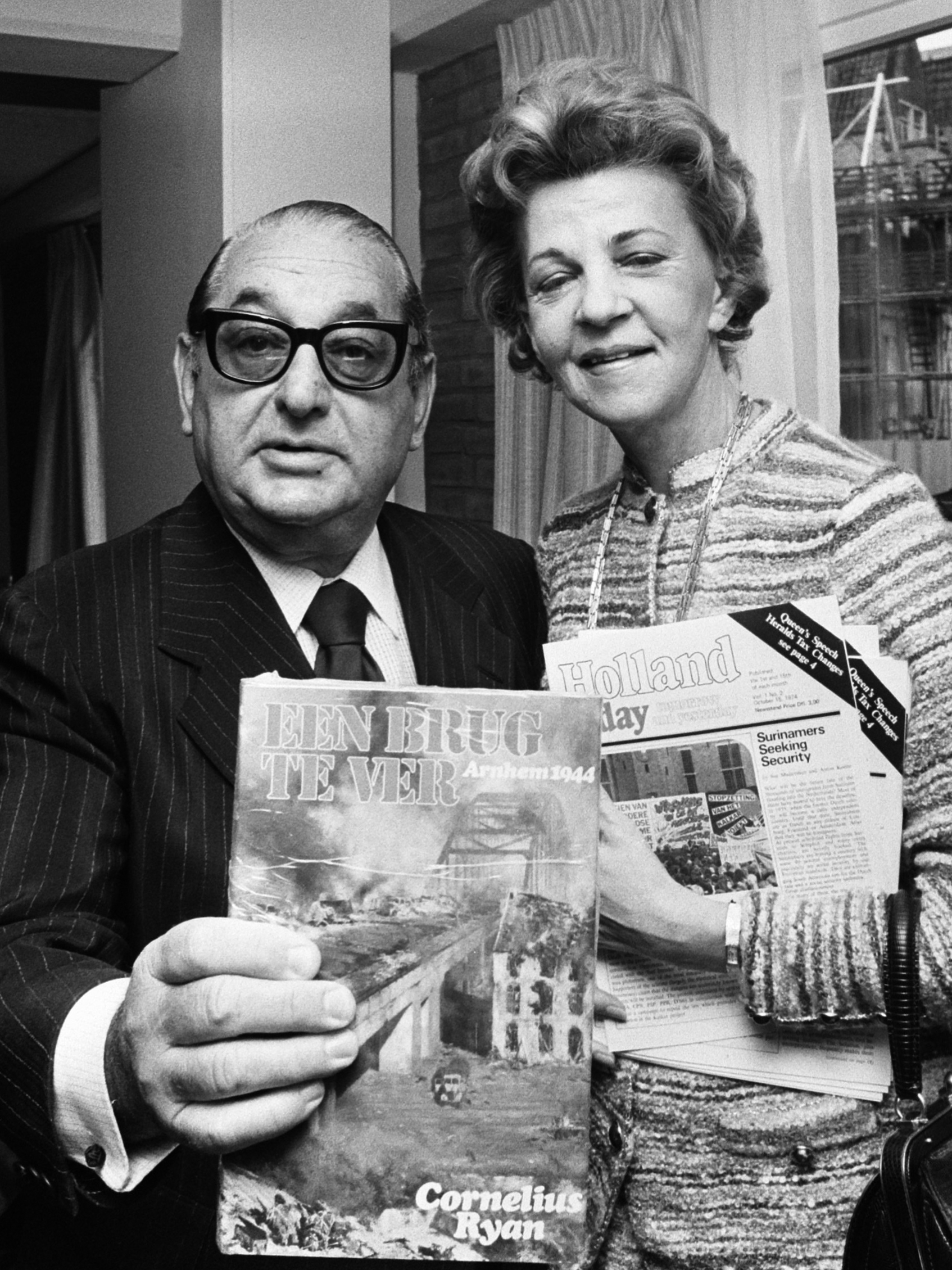
Levine and Cathy Ryan, widow of Cornelius Ryan, announcing the production of A Bridge Too Far in 1975

==== Embassy Pictures is born ====
He entered film production in 1945, co-producing with Maxwell Finn the nostalgic feature film Gaslight Follies, a four-part compilation of silent film clips with such stars as Charlie Chaplin and Douglas Fairbanks; a roundup of newsreel highlights; a condensed version of the 1935 feature The Drunkard; and the 1915 Alan Hale romance East Lynne. With each section narrated by different commentators -- Ben Grauer, John B. Kennedy, and Milton Cross and Ethel Owen) -- the individual parts could also be shown separately as short subjects. Gaslight Follies was released through Levine's own company, Embassy Pictures.

In 1956, Levine achieved great financial success distributing the Japanese monster film Godzilla to American theaters, acquiring the rights for $12,000. Spending $400,000 on marketing and promoting it under the title Godzilla, King of the Monsters!, the picture earned $1 million in theatrical rentals. He then made a $100,000 deal to bring the 1954 French-Italian film Attila to the United States in 1958 and spent $600,000 promoting it, which returned $2 million in rentals.

His breakthrough came the following year with Hercules, starring Steve Reeves and released by RKO Pictures. Levine invested $120,000 on dubbing, sound effects, and new titles and spent $1.25 million on promoting the film. It was one of the highest-grossing films of the year, with rentals of $4.7 million.

==== The promotion of Sophia Loren ====
Levine's Embassy Pictures began dealing in art films, often of European origin, in the 1960s. During that decade, he reached the peak of his prestige, which he sustained into the 1970s.

In 1961, after seeing no more than three minutes of its "rushes", Levine bought North American distribution rights for Two Women, which originated in Italy. He was credited as Executive Producer of the film, which was based on a novella written by Alberto Moravia. The film was directed by Vittorio de Sica and starred Sophia Loren and Eleanora Brown, who acted out the respective roles of a mother and her young daughter who had been displaced from their home during World War II. One scene of the film depicted Moroccan soldiers raping the mother and daughter. Levine's promotional campaign focused on one still photograph, which showed Loren, as the mother, wearing a torn dress, kneeling in the dirt, and weeping with rage and grief. Predicting that she would win the Academy Award for her performance, Levine brought Loren to the United States for interviews, bought space for, and placed, large advertisements in newspapers, and saw to it that Two Women appeared in the cities of residence of Academy Award jury members. Levine's efforts paid off when Loren became the first cast member of a foreign-language film to win the Academy Award for Best Actress.

==== Paramount deal and the Promotion of Carroll Baker ====
In 1963, Levine was offered a $30 million deal with Paramount Pictures (making him a major shareholder) to produce films in the genres of his previous successes. Paramount would finance the films and Embassy would receive part of its profits. Following the deal, Levine paid best-selling author Harold Robbins $900,000 for the rights to three books, which were filmed: The Carpetbaggers (1964), Where Love Has Gone (1964) and Nevada Smith (1966).

Carroll Baker, then a contract player for Paramount Pictures, portrayed a hedonistic widow in The Carpetbaggers. After the film became a huge hit, Levine made Baker his personal protege, actively promoting her career and attempting to refashion her image, which caused the actress to be denigrated as Levine's "blonde bomb sell" (a play on "bombshell"). For The Carpetbaggers Baker had shot a nude scene that was edited out of the US release; however, the scene was the subject of wide-spread publicity. A 1964 New York Times article quoted Baker defending the scene. Speaking of her character, she said:

“She is alone in front of her dressing table. She has just stepped out of the bath and she is the kind of character to whom it would not occur to put on a robe. Doing the scene in the nude was my idea and I think it was a mistake not to show it.”

Levine cast Baker in the potboiler Sylvia, in which she again appeared nude. He then cast Baker in the title role of the ill-fated actress, and Hollywood's original blonde bombshell, Jean Harlow in the biopic Harlow (1965). Sylvia received negative reviews and did poorly at the box office, while Harlow, also a critical failure and released against a rival Harlow movie starring Carol Lynley, flopped despite significant pre-publicity. The Harlow publicity campaign even had Baker featured in an advertisement for Foster Grant sunglasses in LIFE Magazine with stills from the movie.

Relations between Baker and Levine deteriorated. In a 1965 interview, Baker sardonically commented: "I'll say this about Joe Levine: I admire his taste in leading ladies", which led the press to suspect a rift between the actress and producer. Baker sued Levine in 1966 over her contract with Paramount, and she was soon fired by the studio and had her paychecks from Harlow frozen amid the contentious legal dispute. Baker went hundreds of thousands of dollars into debt, though eventually she was awarded $1 million in compensation.

In an interview with Rex Reed in his book People Are Crazy Here (1974), Baker revealed that she had felt pressure in both her working relationship with Levine, and her domestic life with her husband, who she said wanted to maintain an expensive lifestyle:

"We'd been very poor when we started out at the Actors Studio in New York. I was under contract to Joe Levine, who was going around giving me diamonds and behaving like he owned me. I never slept with him or anything, but everyone thought I was his mistress."

Baker relocated to Italy in 1966. She told Reed that her dispute with Paramount and Levine effectively resulted in her being blacklisted by Hollywood.

In the Levine produced film The Oscar, one of the characters, a blonde movie star played by Jean Hale as a harpy, is named Cheryl Barker, a dig at Baker.

==== Later deals and sale of Embassy ====
Levine signed Mike Nichols, one of the most in-demand directors on Broadway, to direct The Graduate (1967) before Nichols made his feature film debut with Who's Afraid of Virginia Woolf? (1966). The Graduate became the highest-grossing film of 1967. Levine hired the established comedian, but first-time director, Mel Brooks to make The Producers (1967). Levine said, "I have a knack for betting on unknown directors and actors and getting my money's worth". The same year, Levine sold Embassy to Avco for $40 million but stayed on as chief executive officer. He later called the sale a "horrible mistake which made me rich". The Lion in Winter (1968), Levine's favorite of his films, won an Academy Award for lead actress Katharine Hepburn.

After the sale to Avco, Levine's films were less commercially successful, except for Mike Nichols' Carnal Knowledge (1971) and A Touch of Class (1973), which was his last hit. Levine resigned from Avco Embassy in 1974 and formed Joseph E. Levine Presents and spent two-and-a-half years making A Bridge Too Far (1977) with his son Richard. His last film was Tattoo (1981).

=== Broadway ===
In April 1964, David Susskind, Daniel Melnick, and Levine took over as producers for the Broadway musical Kelly. Levine financed $250,000 of the $400,000 budget, with the balance coming from Columbia Records and six other investors. The producers also acquired the motion picture rights.

Directed and choreographed by Herbert Ross, the musical began previews at the Broadhurst Theatre on February 1, 1965, and opened (and closed) on February 6 after seven previews and one performance, becoming one of the biggest flops in Broadway history.

Industry representatives quoted in The New York Times stated they "could not recall any other Broadway musical representing such a comparable expenditure that became a casualty so quickly." Costs had ballooned to $650,000, with the biggest loser being Levine, followed by Melnick and Susskind, who had invested a total of $150,000. There had been increasing arguments between the producers and writers, with Susskind complaining that the authors were unwilling to make changes per the recommendations of the investors. Charlap and Lawrence were so upset with changes that they filed suit in New York Supreme Court seeking an injunction to prevent the play from opening. While the judge urged that the parties pursue arbitration, lawyers representing Charlap and Lawrence were threatening to sue for damages that had been caused through "unauthorized changes, omissions and additions" made to the musical.

=== Trademarks ===
Levine became famous in the industry for his massive advertising campaigns, starting with Hercules in 1959. Levine had hired Terry Turner, who had been a former RKO Pictures exploitation expert of the late 1920s and 1930s, where he had exploited King Kong amongst other films. Levine's and Turner's exploitation campaigns were designed to appeal both to the general public and to the film industry and exhibitors. The Adventurers (1970) had a special "airborne world premiere", as the in-flight movie of a TWA Boeing 747 Superjet making its premiere voyage, flying from New York to Los Angeles, with the film's stars and members of the press aboard. It marked the first time that a movie and a plane premiered in the same event.

=== Honors ===
In 1964, Levine received the Golden Globe Cecil B. DeMille Award from the Hollywood Foreign Press Association in recognition of his lifetime achievement in motion pictures.

=== Death ===
Levine was hospitalized on June 21, 1987, and died the following month on July 31 in Greenwich, Connecticut, at the age of 81. His known survivors, in addition to his widow Rosalie, included his son Richard, his daughter Tricia, and two grandchildren.

== Quotes ==
- "You can fool all of the people if the advertising is right."

== In popular culture ==
- He was the subject of 1963 documentary Showman by Albert and David Maysles.
- In an issue of the Fantastic Four (#48), The Thing mentions, upon seeing the sky aflame, that it could be just Joseph E. Levine advertising one of his movies.

== Filmography ==
=== Producer credits ===
- Gaslight Follies (documentary) (1945)
- Morgan, the Pirate (1961)
- The Wonders of Aladdin (1961)
- The Empty Canvas (1963)
- Contempt (1963)
- The Carpetbaggers (1964)
- Only One New York (documentary) (1964)
- Where Love Has Gone (1964)
- Harlow (1965)
- The Spy with a Cold Nose (1966)
- They Call Me Trinity (1970)
- A Bridge Too Far (1977)
- Magic (1978)
- Tattoo (1981)

=== Executive producer credits ===
- The Second Best Secret Agent in the Whole Wide World (1965): Levine renamed this film Licensed to Kill for its American release and added a title song performed by Sammy Davis Jr.
- Darling (uncredited) (1965)
- Sands of the Kalahari (1965)
- Where the Bullets Fly (1966)
- The Oscar (1966)
- The Daydreamer (1966)
- Nevada Smith (1966)
- A Man Called Adam (1966)
- The Idol (1966)
- The Caper of the Golden Bulls (1967)
- Woman Times Seven (1967)
- The Tiger and the Pussycat (1967)
- Robbery (1967)
- Sands of the Kalahari (1967)
- The Graduate (1967)
- The Producers (1967)
- The Lion in Winter (1968)
- Mad Monster Party? (1969)
- Don't Drink the Water (1969)
- Sunflower (1970)
- The Adventurers (1970)
- Soldier Blue (1970)
- Macho Callahan (1970)
- C.C. and Company (1970)
- Carnal Knowledge (1971)
- Trinity Is Still My Name (1971)
- Rivals (1972)
- Thumb Tripping (1972)
- The Day of the Dolphin (1973)

=== Joseph E. Levine presents ===
- Attila: Scourge of God (1954): US release 1958 (retitled, Attila) "Joseph E. Levine presents" (first solo presenter's credit)
- Walk Into Paradise (1956): Levine retitled film, Walk into Hell, for 1957 US release. "Joseph E. Levine in association with Terry Turner presents"
- Godzilla, King of the Monsters! (1956) "A Trans-World Release" (Levine's uncredited Embassy Pictures distributed in eastern US only)
- The Fabulous World of Jules Verne (1957)
- Uncle Was a Vampire (1959)
- Jack the Ripper (1959): (Levine provided a new soundtrack, with music composed by Pete Rugolo, and added color to a sequence of blood in the B&W film.)
- Morgan the Pirate (1960)
- Two Women (uncredited) (1960)
- The Thief of Baghdad (1961)
- The Wonders of Aladdin (1961)
- Long Day's Journey into Night (1962)
- Strangers in the City (1962)
- Boys' Night Out (1962)
- Constantine and the Cross (1962)
- The Last Days of Sodom and Gomorrah (1962)
- Zulu (1964)
- Santa Claus Conquers the Martians (1964) (This film marked the screen debut of Pia Zadora as one of the children.)
- Marriage Italian-Style (uncredited) (1964)
- Dingaka (1965)
