= Long Day's Journey into Night (1962 film) =

1962 film by Sidney Lumet, based on Eugene O'Neill's play

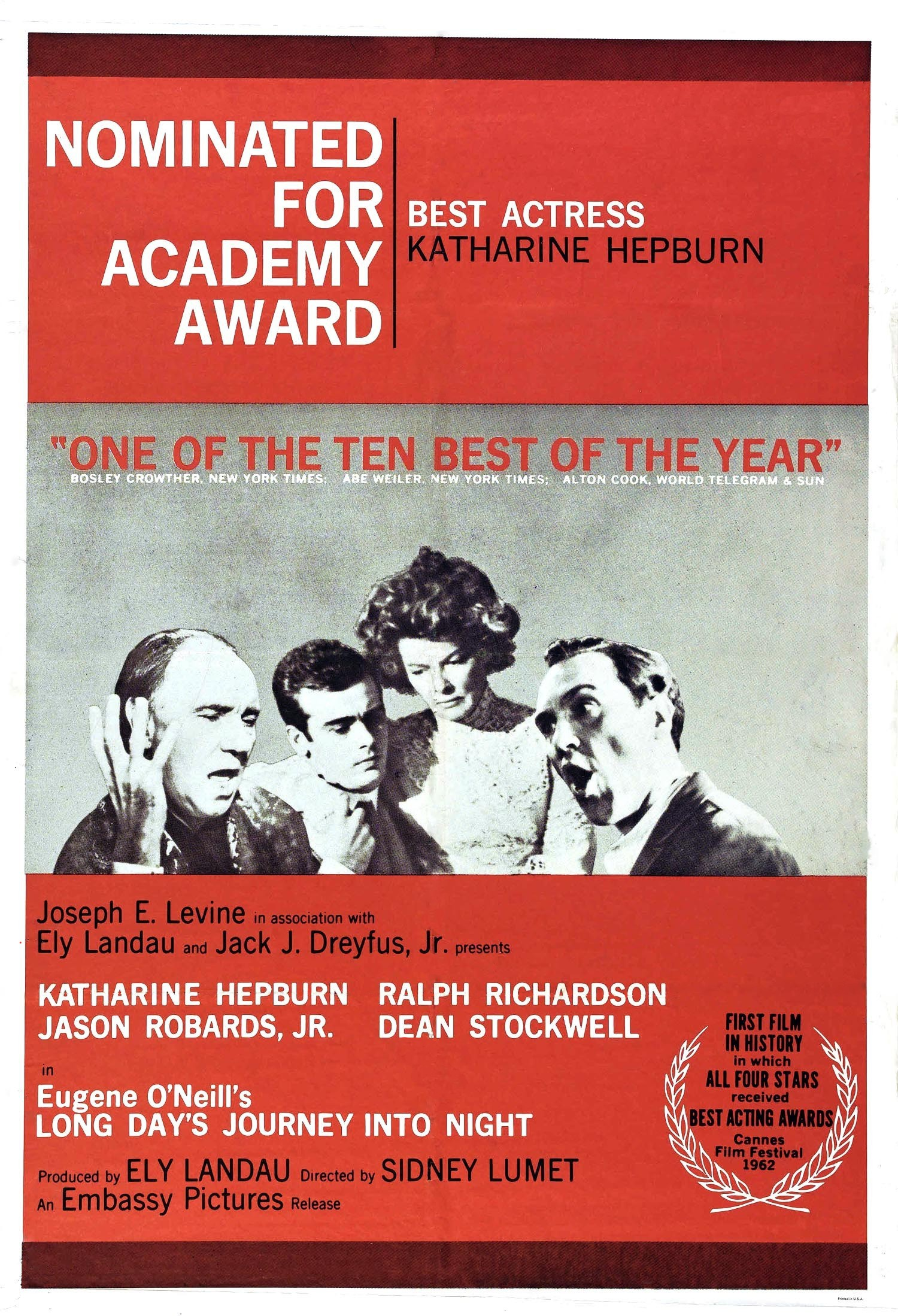
- Theatrical release poster
- Directed by: Sidney Lumet
- Written by: Eugene O'Neill
- Based on: Long Day's Journey into Night (1956 play) by Eugene O'Neill
- Produced by: Ely Landau
- Starring: Katharine Hepburn; Ralph Richardson; Jason Robards; Dean Stockwell
- Cinematography: Boris Kaufman
- Edited by: Ralph Rosenblum
- Music by: André Previn
- Distributed by: Embassy Pictures
- Release dates: May 20, 1962 (Cannes); October 9, 1962 (United States); October 10, 1962 (New York City)
- Running time: 170 minutes
- Country: United States
- Language: English
- Budget: $435,000

Long Day's Journey into Night is a 1962 American drama film directed by Sidney Lumet, adapted from Eugene O'Neill's Pulitzer-winning play of the same name. It stars Katharine Hepburn, Ralph Richardson, Jason Robards, and Dean Stockwell. The story deals with themes of addiction and the resulting dysfunction of the nuclear family, and is drawn from O'Neill's own experiences. It was shot at Chelsea Studios in New York City, with exteriors also shot in New York City in the City Island neighborhood of the Bronx.

The film won Best Actor (for Richardson, Robards, and Stockwell) and Best Actress (for Hepburn) at the Cannes Film Festival and was named by the National Board of Review as one of the Top Ten Films of 1962. Hepburn's performance earned her an Oscar and Golden Globe nomination for Best Actress.

O'Neill's play was adapted to film again in 1996, directed by David Wellington, and in 2025, directed by Jonathan Kent.

== Plot ==
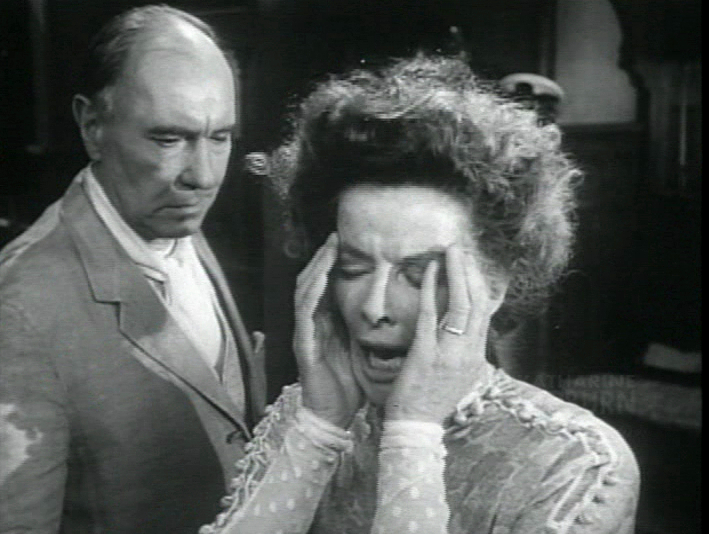
Ralph Richardson (left) as James Tyrone Sr., and Katharine Hepburn (right) as Mary

The film is a direct translation of O'Neill's stage play, without any major cuts or changes to the source material.

== Cast ==
- Katharine Hepburn as Mary Tyrone
- Ralph Richardson as James Tyrone Sr.
- Jason Robards as Jamie Tyrone
- Dean Stockwell as Edmund Tyrone
- Jeanne Barr as Cathleen

== Production ==
=== Development ===
Producer Ely Landau did a version of The Iceman Cometh for TV. This impressed the widow of Eugene O'Neill enough for her to give him the screen rights to Long Day's Journey. The cast and director formed a cooperative and agreed to work for a lower fee in exchange for a percentage of the profits.

=== Casting ===
Jason Robards was the only actor from the stage version to also star in the film. He had won the Tony Award for Best Featured Actor in a Play for playing Jamie Tyrone in the 1957 Broadway staging, and reprised the part in O'Neill's sequel A Moon for the Misbegotten. He later played James Tyrone in several productions of the play.

Marlon Brando was offered the role of Jamie, but turned it down.

=== Filming ===
The film was reportedly shot for $435,000 over 37 days, two days over schedule. The entire film was shot in-sequence, after three weeks of rehearsals. Lumet later wrote that the total budget was $490,000. Exteriors were shot at the house at 21 Tier Street in City Island in the Bronx, and interiors were on sets at Chelsea Television Studios in Manhattan.

== Release ==
The film premiered at the 1962 Cannes Film Festival, where it was nominated for the Palme d'Or and won awards for Best Actor (jointly shared by the male cast) and Best Actress (Hepburn). It had its US premiere on October 10, 1962 in New York City.

Joseph E. Levine bought the film for distribution, but said he lost money on it. "You cannot stay in business by making O'Neill pictures", he said. Lumet later wrote that "there actually were some profits".

== Reception ==
=== Critical response ===
The film has received critical acclaim. Rotten Tomatoes gives a score of 95% based on 17 reviews, with an average score of 8.2/10. Critics regularly praised Lumet's direction and Hepburn's performance.

Dwight MacDonald from Esquire, wrote of the film "In his screen version of Eugene O'Neill's Long Day's Journey Into Night, Sidney Lumet has given us a superb cinematic translation of the only American play to which the much-abused adjective 'great' can seriously be applied." When speaking of Hepburn's performance he said "I have never been an addict of Katharine Hepburn; she struck me usually as mannered, to say the least; but here, stimulated by O'Neill and Lumet, she emerges as a superb tragédienne."

Bosley Crowther of The New York Times said that "Under the direction of Sidney Lumet, they charge the place with electricity. That is, on the whole they do so. They develop an overall sense of deep disquiet within the passionate individuals and an acrid air of smoldering savagery." And when commenting on Hepburn's performance he stated "In the moments of deepest anguish, she is vibrant with hot and tragic truth, an eloquent representation of a lovely woman brought to feeble, helpless ruin."

=== Awards and nominations ===
Ceremony	Category	Nominee(s)	Result
35th Academy Awards	Best Actress	Katharine Hepburn	Nominated
1962 Cannes Film Festival	Palme d'Or	Sidney Lumet	Nominated
1962 Cannes Film Festival	Best Actor	Ralph Richardson, Jason Robards, Dean Stockwell	Won
1962 Cannes Film Festival	Best Actress	Katharine Hepburn	Won
15th Directors Guild of America Awards	Outstanding Directorial Achievement in Motion Pictures	Sidney Lumet	Nominated
20th Golden Globe Awards	Best Actress in a Motion Picture – Drama	Katharine Hepburn	Nominated
Laurel Awards	Top Female Dramatic Performance	Katharine Hepburn	Nominated
1962 National Board of Review Awards	Top Ten Films	Long Day's Journey into Night	Won
1962 National Board of Review Awards	Best Actor	Jason Robards (also for Tender is the Night)	Won

== See also ==
- List of American films of 1962
