= Sergio Mendizábal =

Spanish film and television actor (1920–2005)

- Born: Hermenegildo Igarzabal Sánchez; 3 July 1920; San Sebastián, Spain
- Died: 2005 (aged 84–85)
- Years active: 1955–1999

Hermenegildo Igarzabal Sánchez, known by his stage name as Sergio Mendizábal (3 July 1920 – 2005), was a Spanish film and television actor. He appeared in over 100 films and television programs, including the films For a Few Dollars More and The Good, the Bad and the Ugly.

He was born in San Sebastián on 3 July 1920. He got a degree in Instituto de Investigaciones y Experiencias Cinematográficas. He made his role debut in Mr. Arkadin, by Orson Welles. Other roles includes El buen amor by Paco Regueiro, or Viridiana (1961) and Tristana (1969) by Luis Buñuel.

== Partial filmography ==
- The Other Life of Captain Contreras (1955) - Party Goer (uncredited)
- The Guardian of Paradise (1955) - Client Boite (uncredited)
- Mr. Arkadin (1955) - (uncredited)
- The Big Lie (1956) - Cinematographer (uncredited)
- Tambien Hay Cielo Sobre El Mar (1956)
- Y Eligió El Infierno (1957)
- Stories of Madrid (1958) - St. Cartagena, the Councilman
- The Italians They Are Crazy (1958)
- Gil Zitelloni (1958)
- Luna de Verano (1959) - Student
- Park Retreat (1959)
- Back to the Door (1959)
- Bajo El Cielo Andaluz (1960) - Pepito Nogales
- Festival in Benidorm (1961)
- La Estatua (1961) - Don Andres
- Viridiana (1961) - El Pelon (uncredited)
- Savage Guns (1961) - Mayor
- Los Que No Fuimos A La Gurera (1962) - Mediavilla
- The Gang of Eight (1962)
- Face of Terror (1962) - Police Doctor (uncredited)
- Los Guerrilleros (1963)
- The Good Love (1963) - Friar
- From Pink to Yellow (1963) - Priest
- Una tal Dulcinea (1963)
- The Executioner (1963) - Companion of the Marquis
- A Nearly Decent Girl (1963)
- Se Necesita Chico (1963)
- The Art of Living (1965) - Comrade of Luis
- Double Edged Crime (1965) - Don Francisco
- Megaton Ye-Ye (1965)
- For a Few Dollars More (1965) - Tucumcari Bank Manager
- El Rayo Desintegrador (1966)
- Man on the Spying Trapeze (1966) - Joseph
- The Good, the Bad and the Ugly (1966) - Blonde Bounty Hunter
- Fantasy... 3 (1966) - King
- Great Friends (1967) - The Priest
- Tomorrow Will Be Another Day (1967) - Lord (uncredited)
