= Chelsea Studios =

Television studio in Manhattan, New York

Coordinates: 40°44′48″N 73°59′43″W

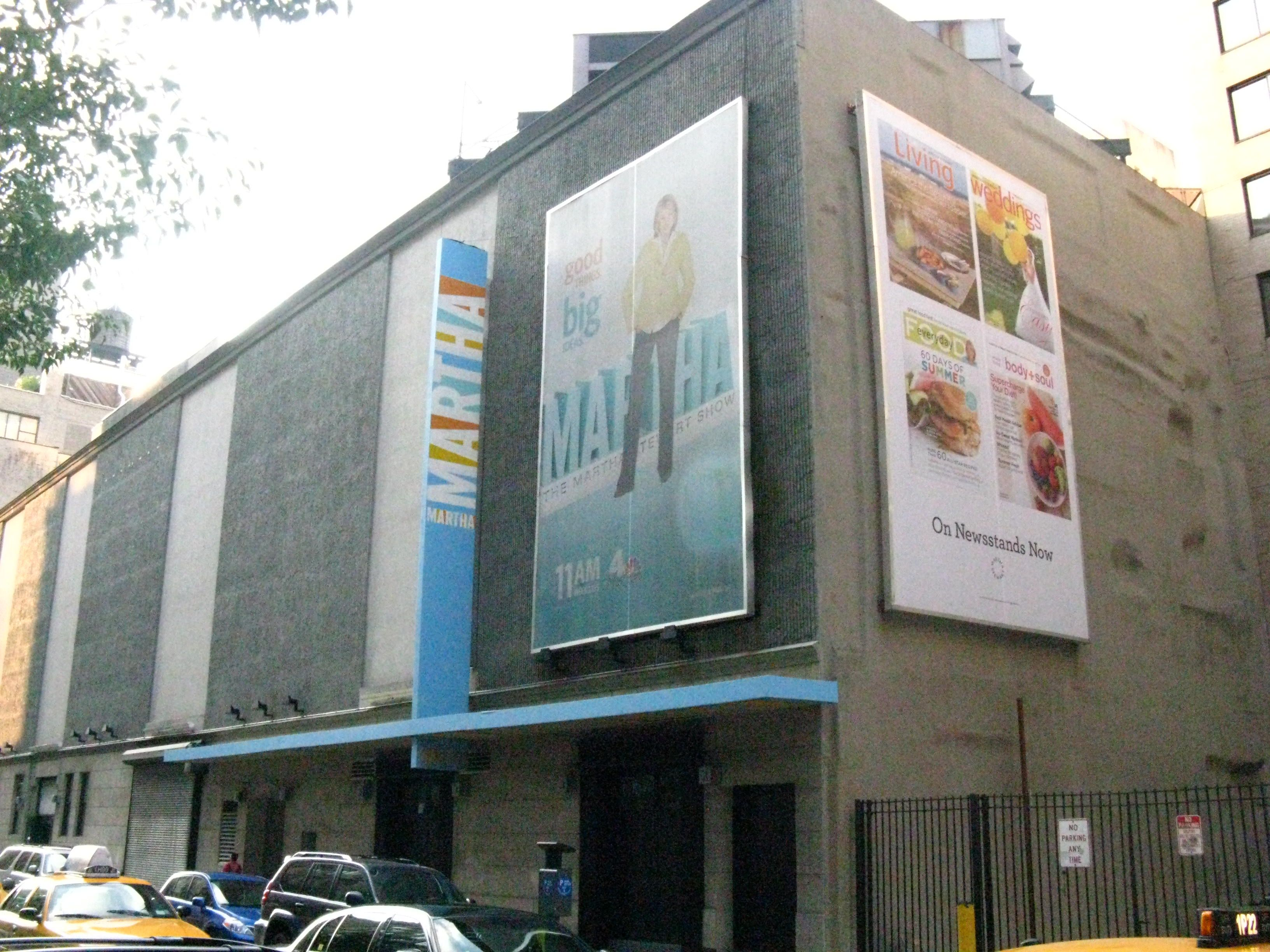
Chelsea Studios

Chelsea Studios, also known as Chelsea Television Studios, is an American television studio and sound stage located at 221 West 26th Street between Seventh and Eighth Avenues in Chelsea, Manhattan, New York City.

== History ==
The building was originally an armory which was home to the Ninth Mounted Cavalry, which moved to 14th Street in 1914. Adolph Zukor turned it into a studio for the Famous Players Film Company. Among the films produced there were An American Citizen and That Man from Mexico starring John Barrymore.

In the 1950s, Himan Brown bought the studio and gutted it to create two sound stages known as Production Center Studios. In the 1960s and 70s, Brown leased the facility to CBS for soap opera productions. As of February 2019, it is owned by All Mobile Video.

== Films ==
- A Good Little Devil (1914)
- 12 Angry Men (1957)
- BUtterfield 8 (1960)
- Long Day's Journey Into Night (1962)
- The Miracle Worker (1962)
- You're A Big Boy Now (1967)
- The Night They Raided Minsky's (1968)
- The Producers (1968)
- The Boys in the Band (1970)
- The Anderson Tapes (1971)

Sources:Silent Era, Movielove

== Television ==
- The Phil Silvers Show (1955–1959)
- Mama (1956–1957)
- Decoy (1957–1958)
- Show of the Week (CBS) (1954–1956)
- The Patty Duke Show (1963–1966)
- Inner Sanctum
- As the World Turns (1965–1967)
- Love of Life (1951–1980)
- Guiding Light (1968–1988)
- Search for Tomorrow (1976–1977)
- The Jon Stewart Show (1994–1995)
- Ricki Lake (1993–2004)
- Where in the World Is Carmen Sandiego (1991)
- Judge Hatchett (2000–2008)
- Judge Karen (2008-2009)
- The Wendy Williams Show (2008, 2012–2022)
- Martha (2005–2012)
- The Tyra Banks Show (2007–2010)
- Stump the Schwab (2003–2005)
- Sunday Night (1988-1990)
- Rachael Ray (2012–2023)
- Skavlan (2009–2021)
- Sherri (2022–2026)
