= Padre nuestro (1985 film) =

1985 film

- Theatrical release poster
- Directed by: Francisco Regueiro
- Written by: Francisco Regueiro; Ángel Fernández-Santos
- Produced by: Eduardo Ducay; Julián Marcos
- Starring: Francisco Rabal; Fernando Rey; Victoria Abril
- Cinematography: Juan Amorós
- Edited by: Pedro del Rey
- Release date: 22 April 1985 (Spain)
- Running time: 105 minutes
- Country: Spain
- Language: Spanish

Padre nuestro is a 1985 Spanish drama film directed by Francisco Regueiro. It stars Francisco Rabal, Fernando Rey, and Victoria Abril.

== Plot ==
A terminally-ill Spanish cardinal returns to his hometown in Spain to arrange family affairs before dying, meeting his illegitimate daughter (a prostitute locally known as "La Cardenala") and his granddaughter, as well as asking his atheist brother Abel to marry his daughter, so she can get recognition.

== Cast ==
- Victoria Abril as la cardenala
- Rafaela Aparicio as Jerónima
- Lina Canalejas as Blanca
- Emma Penella as María
- Francisco Rabal as Abel
- Fernando Rey as Fernando
- Amelia de la Torre as Valentina, la madre
- José Vivó as el papa

== Release ==
The film was released theatrically in Spain on 22 April 1985. It also screened in the Un Certain Regard section at the 38th Cannes Film Festival.

== Reception ==
Diego Galán of El País deemed Padre nuestro to be a film boasting a "curious beauty, more complex than it appears at first glance and more disturbing than the title promised".

== See also ==
- List of Spanish films of 1985
