= The Long Absence =

1961 film by Henri Colpi

The Long Absence (Une Aussi Longue Absence)
- Film poster
- French: Une aussi longue absence
- Literally: Such a long absence
- Directed by: Henri Colpi
- Written by: Marguerite Duras; Gérard Jarlot
- Produced by: Alberto Barsanti; Claude Jaeger
- Starring: Alida Valli; Georges Wilson; Charles Blavette
- Cinematography: Marcel Weiss
- Edited by: Jasmine Chasney; Jacqueline Meppiel
- Music by: Georges Delerue
- Distributed by: Commercial Pictures
- Release dates: 17 May 1961 (France); 15 November 1962 (U.S.)
- Running time: 85 minutes
- Country: France
- Language: French

The Long Absence (French: Une aussi longue absence, lit. 'Such a long absence') is a 1961 French drama film directed by Henri Colpi. It tells the story of Thérèse (Alida Valli), a Puteaux café owner mourning the mysterious disappearance of her husband sixteen years earlier. A tramp arrives in the town and she believes him to be her husband. But he is suffering from amnesia and she tries to bring back his memory of earlier times.

The Long Absence shared the Palme d'Or prize with the Luis Buñuel film Viridiana at the 1961 Cannes Film Festival. It also won the 1960 Louis Delluc Prize for best film.

== Plot ==
Sixteen years after the end of World War II, Thérèse Langlois owns a pub in Puteaux, Paris. Wrapping up the season, she plans her annual vacation in Chaulieu with her lover but is growing emotionally distant towards him. At the pub, a tramp walks by daily, singing The Barber of Seville aria and other opera songs. Intrigued, Thérèse has her bartender, Martine, call the tramp in for a drink. The tramp, who says he lives by the river, reveals he is suffering from amnesia but carries identification indicating his name is Robert Landais. After the tramp leaves, Thérèse follows him to the river and studies his face and movements; she becomes convinced he is, in fact, her long-lost husband, Albert Langlois.

Determined to make the tramp remember his past identity, Thérèse brings Albert's aunt Alice to the pub, along with Albert's nephew. While the tramp is sitting at another table, the three Langlois loudly recount Albert's story: During the war, Albert had been arrested by the French police in Chaulieu in June 1944 and turned over to the Gestapo in Angers, spending time in a camp with his friend Aldo Ganbini. Thérèse herself (née Ganbini) was originally from Chaulieu but stayed in Puteaux, they recount. The tramp leaves the pub without acknowledging himself as Albert. Alice discloses to Thérèse that she did not recognize the tramp and believes he is not a physical match for Albert, also pointing out that Albert had no knowledge of the opera. Thérèse disagrees, arguing that Albert could have learned the songs while imprisoned with Aldo.

Thérèse ends her relationship with her lover and meets with the tramp for dinner, after which they dance. The tramp still does not indicate he remembers anything about a past life as Albert. As the tramp leaves, Thérèse loudly calls out the name "Albert Langlois," and other friends join in. Overwhelmed, the tramp stops, raises his hands in a pose of surrender, and flees. As he runs, he narrowly avoids a traffic accident. Thérèse's friends tell her the tramp is unharmed but that he is gone and try to persuade her to give up on bringing his memories back. Thérèse is unconvinced by them, deciding that it will be easier to try to restore the tramp's memories in the upcoming winter season.

== Song ==
Trois petites notes de musique is a waltz by Georges Delerue with lyrics by Henri Colpi and sung by Cora Vaucaire.

== Cast ==
- Alida Valli as Thérèse Langlois
- Georges Wilson as The Tramp
- Charles Blavette as Fernand
- Amédée as Marcel Langlois
- Paul Faivre as Pensioner
- Pierre Parel as Manager
- Catherine Fonteney as Alice
- Diane Lepvrier as Martine (as Diana Lepvrier)
- Nane Germon as Simone
- Georges Bellec as Young man
- Charles Bouillaud as Favier
- Corrado Guarducci as Workman
- Clément Harari as Man at Juke Box
- Jean Luisi as Workman
- Pierre Mirat as Druggist

== Reception ==
In 2016, The Hollywood Reporter ranked the film 68th among 69 counted winners of the Palme d'Or to date, judging it forgettable.

=== Accolades ===
The Long Absence shared the Palme d'Or prize with the Luis Buñuel film Viridiana at the 1961 Cannes Film Festival.

Award	Date of ceremony	Category	Recipient(s)	Result	Ref(s)
British Academy Film Awards	1963	Best Film		Nominated	
British Academy Film Awards	1963	Best Foreign Actor	Georges Wilson	Nominated	
Cannes Film Festival	May 1961	Palme d'Or		Won	
