= 1961 Cannes Film Festival =

- Official poster of the 14th Cannes Film Festival, an original illustration by A.M. Rodicq.
- Opening film: The Joy of Living
- Location: Cannes, France
- Founded: 1946
- Awards: Palme d'Or: The Long Absence; Viridiana
- No. of films: 30 (In Competition)
- Festival date: 3 May 1961 – 18 May 1961
- Website: festival-cannes.com/en

Cannes Film Festival
- 1962 1960

The 14th Cannes Film Festival took place from 3 to 18 May 1961. French writer Jean Giono served as jury president for the main competition.

The Palme d'Or was jointly awarded to The Long Absence by Henri Colpi and Viridiana by Luis Buñuel.

The festival also screened Shirley Clarke's debut film The Connection, due to the efforts of the French Syndicate of Cinema Critics. The success of the film caused the festival to create International Critics' Week the following year.

The festival opened with The Joy of Living by René Clément.

== Jury ==
=== Main Competition ===
- Jean Giono, French writer - Jury President
- Sergei Yutkevich, Soviet filmmaker - Jury Vice President
- Pedro Armendáriz, Mexican actor
- Luigi Chiarini, Italian filmmaker
- Tonino Delli Colli, Italian cinematographer
- Claude Mauriac, French writer and journalist
- Édouard Molinaro, French filmmaker
- Jean Paulhan, French writer
- Raoul Ploquin, French writer and producer
- Liselotte Pulver, Swiss actress
- Fred Zinnemann, Austrian-American filmmaker

=== Short Films Competition ===
- Ion Popescu-Gopo, Romanian artist- Jury President
- Pierre Prévert, French
- Jurgen Schildt, Swedish journalist
- Jean Vidal, French
- Jean Vivie, French CST official

== Official Selection ==
=== Main Competition ===
The following feature films competed for the Palme d'Or:

English title	Original title	Director(s)	Production country
The Brute	Dúvad	Zoltán Fábri	Hungary
Chronicle of Flaming Years	Повесть пламенных лет	Yuliya Solntseva	Soviet Union
The Cossacks	Казаки	Vasili Pronin	Soviet Union
Darclee		Mihai Iacob	Romania
The First Mass	A Primeira Missa	Lima Barreto	Brazil
The Fourteenth Day	Дан четрнаести	Zdravko Velimirović	Yugoslavia
Girl with a Suitcase	La Ragazza con la valigia	Valerio Zurlini	Italy, France
Goodbye Again	Aimez-vous Brahms?	Anatole Litvak	United States, France
The Hand in the Trap	La Mano en la trampa	Leopoldo Torre Nilsson	Argentina
Her Brother	おとうと	Kon Ichikawa	Japan
The Hoodlum Priest		Irvin Kershner	United States
I Like Mike	איי לייק מייק	Peter Frye	Israel
The Joy of Living (opening film)	Che gioia vivere	René Clément	Italy, France
The Judge	Domaren	Alf Sjöberg	Sweden
The Knife	Het Mes	Fons Rademakers	Netherlands
The Last Witness	Der Letzte Zeuge	Wolfgang Staudte	West Germany
The Long Absence	Une aussi longue absence	Henri Colpi	France
The Lovemakers	La Viaccia	Mauro Bolognini	Italy
Madalena	Μανταλένα	Dinos Dimopoulos	Greece
The Mark		Guy Green	United Kingdom
Mother Joan of the Angels	Matka Joanna od aniolów	Jerzy Kawalerowicz	Poland
The Passionate Demons	Line	Nils Reinhardt Christensen	Norway
Plein sud		Gaston De Gerlache	Belgium
A Raisin in the Sun		Daniel Petrie	United States
Sky Above and Mud Beneath	Le Ciel et la boue	Pierre-Dominique Gaisseau	France
A Song About the Gray Pigeon	Pieseň o sivom holubovi	Stanislav Barabáš	Czechoslovakia
That Forward Center Died at Dawn	El Centroforward murió al amanecer	René Mugica	Argentina
Two Women	La Ciociara	Vittorio De Sica	Italy, France
Viridiana		Luis Buñuel	Spain, Mexico
The Wastrel	Il Relitto	Michael Cacoyannis	Italy, Cyprus

=== Out of Competition ===
The following film was selected to be screened out of competition:

- Exodus by Otto Preminger

=== Short Films Competition ===
The following short films competed for the Short Film Palme d'Or:

- Aicha by Noureddine Mechri and Francis Warin
- Argentina paraiso de la pesca by Antonio Ber Ciani
- The Art of Lee Hsiang-Fen by Henry T.C. Wang
- Balgarski ansambal za narodni pesni i tanzi by Lada Boyadjieva
- The Black Cat by Robert Braverman
- Cattle Ranch by Guy L. Coté
- Children of the Sun by John Hubley and Faith Hubley
- The Creation of Woman by Charles F. Schwep
- Cyrus le grand by Feri Farzaneh
- The Do-It-Yourself Cartoon Kit
- Dog Barbos and Unusual Cross by Leonid Gaidai
- Fantazie pro levou ruku a lidske svedomi by Pavel Hobl
- Le Festival de Baalbeck 1960 by David McDonald
- Folkwangschulen by Herbert Vesely
- Foroyar by Jørgen Roos
- Fuego en Castilla (Tactilvisión del páramo del espanto) by José Val del Omar
- Giovedi: passeggiata by Vincenzo Gamna
- Gorod bolshoy sudby by Ilya Kopalin
- House of Hashimoto by Connie Rasinski
- Hudozhnikat Zlatyu Boyadzhiev by Ivan Popov
- Kangra et kulu by N.S. Thapa
- Na vez by Branko Kalacic
- Nebbia by Raffaele Andreassi
- Paul Valéry by Roger Leenhardt
- Párbaj by Gyula Macskássy
- La Petite Cuillère by Carlos Vilardebó
- Robert Frost by Sidney J. Stiber
- Souvenirs from Sweden by Henning Carlsen
- Taketori Monogatari by Kazuhiko Watanabe
- W kręgu ciszy by Jerzy Ziarnik

== Official Awards ==
=== Main Competition ===
- Palme d'Or:
  - The Long Absence by Henri Colpi
  - Viridiana by Luis Buñuel
- Prix spécial du Jury: Mother Joan of the Angels by Jerzy Kawalerowicz
- Best Director: Yuliya Solntseva for Chronicle of Flaming Years
- Best Actress: Sophia Loren for Two Women
- Best Actor: Anthony Perkins for Goodbye Again

=== Short Films Competition ===
- Short Film Palme d'Or: La Petite Cuillère by Carlos Vilardebó
- Jury Prize - Best Short Film: Párbaj by Gyula Macskássy
- Short film Technical Prize - Special mention:
  - Folkwangschulen by Herbert Vesely
  - Fuego en Castilla by José Val del Omar

== Independent Awards ==
=== FIPRESCI Prize ===
- The Hand in the Trap by Leopoldo Torre Nilsson
- Chronicle of a Summer by Edgar Morin and Jean Rouch

=== Commission Supérieure Technique ===
- Technical Grand Prize - Feature film Special Mention:
  - Her Brother by Kon Ichikawa
  - Chronicle of Flaming Years by Yuliya Solntseva

=== OCIC Award ===
- The Hoodlum Priest by Irvin Kershner

=== Other Awards ===
- Gary Cooper Award: A Raisin in the Sun by Daniel Petrie

== Media ==
- Institut National de l'Audiovisuel: Opening of the 1961 festival (commentary in French)
- INA: Eventful climbing of the steps at the 1961 Cannes Festival (commentary in French)
- INA: Sidney Poitier on the question of race (1961) (commentary in French)
