= 16th British Academy Film Awards =

1963 film awards ceremony

- Date: 1963

Highlights
- Best Film: Lawrence of Arabia
- Best British Film: Lawrence of Arabia
- Most awards: Lawrence of Arabia (4)
- Most nominations: Billy Budd & Lawrence of Arabia (5)

The 16th British Academy Film Awards, given by the British Academy of Film and Television Arts in 1963, honoured the best films of 1962.

== Winners and nominees ==
=== Best Film ===
Lawrence of Arabia

- Billy Budd
- A Kind of Loving
- Lola
- The L-Shaped Room
- The Miracle Worker
- The Manchurian Candidate
- Only Two Can Play
- Phaedra
- West Side Story
- Une aussi longue absence
- Tu ne tueras point
- Through a Glass Darkly
- Jules and Jim
- Hadaka no shima
- The Lady with the Dog
- The Elusive Corporal
- Last Year at Marienbad

=== Best British Film ===
Lawrence of Arabia

- Billy Budd
- A Kind of Loving
- The L-Shaped Room
- Only Two Can Play

=== Best Foreign Actor ===
Burt Lancaster in Birdman of Alcatraz

- Anthony Quinn in Lawrence of Arabia
- Kirk Douglas in Lonely Are the Brave
- Robert Ryan in Billy Budd
- Charles Laughton in Advise and Consent
- Franco Citti in Accattone
- George Hamilton in Light in the Piazza
- Jean-Paul Belmondo in Léon Morin, prêtre
- Georges Wilson in Une aussi longue absence

=== Best British Actor ===
Peter O'Toole in Lawrence of Arabia

- Richard Attenborough in The Dock Brief
- Alan Bates in A Kind of Loving
- James Mason in Lolita
- Peter Sellers in Only Two Can Play
- Laurence Olivier in Term of Trial

=== Best British Actress ===
Leslie Caron in The L-Shaped Room

- Janet Munro in Life for Ruth
- Virginia Maskell in The Wild and the Willing

=== Best Foreign Actress ===
Anne Bancroft in The Miracle Worker

- Jeanne Moreau in Jules and Jim
- Anouk Aimée in Lola
- Melina Mercouri in Phaedra
- Natalie Wood in Splendor in the Grass
- Geraldine Page in Sweet Bird of Youth
- Harriet Anderson in Through a Glass Darkly

=== Best British Screenplay ===
Lawrence of Arabia - Robert Bolt

=== Best Animated Film ===
The Apple

- Four Line Conics
- The Travelling Tune
