= Viridiana =

1961 film by Luis Buñuel

- French poster
- Directed by: Luis Buñuel
- Written by: Luis Buñuel; Julio Alejandro
- Produced by: Gustavo Alatriste
- Starring: Silvia Pinal; Francisco Rabal; Fernando Rey
- Cinematography: José F. Aguayo
- Edited by: Pedro del Rey
- Distributed by: Films Sans Frontières
- Release dates: 17 May 1961 (Cannes Film Festival); 10 October 1963 (Mexico); 9 April 1977 (Barcelona); 2 May 1977 (Madrid)
- Running time: 90 minutes
- Countries: Spain; Mexico
- Language: Spanish

Viridiana (pronounced [biɾiˈðjana]) is a 1961 Spanish-Mexican surrealist comedy-drama film directed by Luis Buñuel and produced by Gustavo Alatriste. It is loosely based on the 1895 novel Halma by Benito Pérez Galdós.

The film was the co-winner of the Palme d'Or at the 1961 Cannes Film Festival, but was banned in Spain and denounced by the Holy See for its criticism of the Catholic Church. In a 2016 poll of 350 experts organized by Spanish film magazine Caimán Cuadernos de Cine, it was voted the best Spanish film of all time, with 227 votes.

== Plot ==
Before taking her final vows as a nun, Viridiana is instructed to visit her only living relative, an uncle named Don Jaime who financed her education. Don Jaime is a recluse with a decaying mansion and estate, cared for by a servant named Ramona.

On Viridiana's last night at the estate, Don Jaime discloses that his wife, who bore an uncanny resemblance to Viridiana, died in their bed on their wedding night. He implores Viridiana to wear the wedding dress and veil that he has lovingly preserved. After drugging her coffee, he carries her to the bed and is on the verge of raping her when he regains control of himself.

In the morning, he claims that Viridiana can no longer return to the convent because she is no longer a virgin. Despite his pleas and insistence that it was a lie, she packs her belongings and flees. Waiting at a bus stop, she is apprehended by the police and brought back to the mansion. Don Jaime has hanged himself, leaving a will that divides his assets between Viridiana and an illegitimate son named Jorge.

Determined that she cannot lead a life as a nun, Viridiana decides to assist those in need. She gathers vagrants at the mansion, providing them with shelter and sustenance in the outbuildings and leading them in prayer. Jorge, along with his girlfriend Lucía, arrives and becomes engrossed in renovating the neglected land and buildings. He also initiates a covert relationship with Ramona. Bored by rustic isolation and envious of Jorge's interest in Viridiana, Lucía leaves.

One night, while Jorge and Viridiana are in town on business with Ramona, the beggars break into the mansion. Initially, they pilfer items, but then decide to stage a banquet, complete with a group photograph parodying Leonardo da Vinci's The Last Supper. This event devolves into a drunken orgy of sex and destruction. When the owners return, most of the beggars flee, but two men capture Jorge and Viridiana, tying him up while one starts to rape Viridiana at knifepoint. As the other waits his turn, Jorge persuades him with cash to kill the assailant. The police arrive, summoned by Ramona.

A few nights later, Ramona and Jorge are playing cards in his bedroom to lively music (Note: The 1959 record "Shimmy Doll" performed by Ashley Beaumont plays during this scene.) when they invite Viridiana in to create a threesome.

=== Censored ending ===
The Spanish board of censors rejected the original ending of the film, which depicted Viridiana entering Jorge's room and slowly closing the door behind her. A new ending was written and accepted that, according to some film historians, is considered even more debauched, albeit less explicit than the first. This new ending implies a ménage à trois involving Jorge, Ramona, and Viridiana. The released version of the film concludes with Jorge shuffling a deck of playing cards while saying, "You know, the first time I saw you, I thought, 'My cousin and I will end up playing tute together.'"

== Cast ==
- Silvia Pinal as Viridiana
- Francisco Rabal as Jorge, Don Jaime's illegitimate son
- Fernando Rey as Don Jaime, the widower of Viridiana's aunt
- Margarita Lozano as Ramona, Don Jaime's maid
- Victoria Zinny as Lucía, Jorge's girlfriend
- Teresita Rabal as Rita, Ramona's young daughter
- Rosita Yarza as the mother superior at Viridiana's convent (uncredited)
- Francisco René as Moncho, the caretaker at Don Jaime's estate (uncredited)
- Alfonso Cordón as Ramón, the foreman of the crew Jorge hires to fix up the estate (uncredited)
- Manuel Alexandre as the peasant from whom Jorge buys a dog (uncredited)
- José María Lado as the mayor (uncredited)

The Beggars

- José Calvo as Don Amalio, who is blind
- José Manuel Martín as "El Cojo" ("The Lame"), who has a bandaged foot and paints
- Luis Heredia as Manuel "El Poca" ("The Little"), an elderly man who is short and thin
- Joaquín Roa as Don Zequiel, a short, elderly man with a white beard
- Lola Gaos as Enedina, who has two small daughters and cooks
- María Isbert (credited as Maruja Isbert) as a woman who plays the guitar
- Juan García Tiendra as José "El Leproso" ("The Leper"), who has sores on his left forearm (uncredited)
- Milagros Tomás as Refugio, who is pregnant (uncredited)
- Joaquin Mayol as Paco, who used to weave (uncredited)
- Palmira Guerra as "La Jardinera" ("The Gardener"), who gardens (uncredited)
- Alicia Jorge Barriga as "La Erona", who is a little person (uncredited)
- Sergio Mendizábal as "El Pelón" ("The Bald"), who walks with a crutch and chooses not to come to the estate (uncredited)

== Reception ==
While Viridiana is regarded by many modern critics as a masterpiece, it was met with controversy on release. The film was sent by the Spanish cinematographic authority to the 1961 Cannes Film Festival, where it shared the Palme d'Or, the festival's highest prize, with Henri Colpi's The Long Absence. However, L'Osservatore Romano, the official newspaper of the Holy See, described Viridiana as "blasphemous", and the government of Francisco Franco banned it in Spain. According to executive producer Pere Portabella, Spanish authorities tried to have the original negative burned, and it only survived because it was with a foreign company who had done some post-production work. The film was not released in Spain until 1977, two years after Franco's death, when Buñuel was 77 years old. For his part, Buñuel said that he "didn't deliberately set out to be blasphemous, but then Pope John XXIII is a better judge of such things than I am".

The film won the Belgian Film Critics Association's Grand Prix in 1962, but Bosley Crowther of The New York Times wrote:

Luis Buñuel is presenting a variation on an ancient theme in his new Spanish film, Viridiana, which came to the Paris yesterday. The theme is that well-intended charity can often be badly misplaced by innocent, pious people. Therefore, beware of charity. ... It is an ugly, depressing view of life. And, to be frank about it, it is a little old-fashioned, too. His format is strangely literary; his symbols are obvious and blunt, such as the revulsion of the girl toward milking or the display of a penknife built into a crucifix. And there is something just a bit corny about having his bums doing their bacchanalian dance to the thunder of the "Hallelujah Chorus."

In 2012, Viridiana was voted the 37th greatest film of all time in the British Film Institute's Sight and Sound directors' poll and the 110th greatest in the critics' poll. In 2022, it placed 52nd in the directors' poll. On the review aggregator website Rotten Tomatoes, 97% of 33 critics' reviews are positive. The website's consensus reads: "Viridiana is quintessential Bunuel: a masterpiece against the grain, designed to shock and awe."

== Home video ==
The film was released by The Criterion Collection in the United States and by Madman Entertainment in Australia (on the "Directors Suite" label) and New Zealand.
