= The Lovers of Teruel (film) =

1962 film

- Directed by: Raymond Rouleau
- Written by: René-Louis Lafforgue; Raymond Rouleau
- Starring: Ludmilla Tchérina
- Cinematography: Claude Renoir
- Edited by: Marinette Cadix
- Music by: René-Louis Lafforgue; Henri Sauguet; Mikis Theodorakis
- Release date: 23 May 1962
- Running time: 90 minutes
- Country: France
- Language: French

The Lovers of Teruel (French: Les Amants de Teruel) is a 1962 French musical film directed by Raymond Rouleau. It was entered into the 1962 Cannes Film Festival.

== Cast ==
- Ludmilla Tchérina - Isa
- René-Louis Lafforgue - Barker (as René-Louis Laforgue)
- Milko Sparemblek - Manuel
- Milenko Banovitch - Diego
- Stevan Grebel - Grebelito
- Jean-Pierre Bras - Father
- Antoine Marin - Pablo
- Roberto - Dwarf
- Luce Fabiole
- Jeanne Herviale
- Philippe Rouleau - L'amoureux
- Jean Saudray - Le cycliste
- Bernadette Stern - L'amoureuse
