= Codine =

1963 film

- Directed by: Henri Colpi
- Written by: Dumitru Carabat; Henri Colpi; Panait Istrati; Yves Jamiaque
- Produced by: Samy Halfon
- Starring: Alexandru Virgil Platon
- Cinematography: Stefan Horvath; Marcel Weiss
- Edited by: Henri Colpi
- Release date: 15 May 1963
- Running time: 98 minutes
- Countries: France; Romania
- Language: French

Codine is a 1963 French-Romanian crime film directed by Henri Colpi. It was entered into the 1963 Cannes Film Festival where it won the award for Best Screenplay.

== Cast ==
- Alexandru Virgil Platon as Codine
- Françoise Brion as Irène
- Nelly Borgeaud as Zoitza Zograffi
- Maurice Sarfati as Alexis
- Răzvan Petrescu as Adrian Zograffi (as Razvan Petresco)
- Germaine Kerjean as Anastasia
- Graziela Albini
- Ion Anghel
- Nicolae Bodescu
- Dorin Dron (as Dorine Dron)
- Mihai Fotino as Cotoiul
- Eliza Petrăchescu as Catrina
- Victor Moldovan as Anton
