= Henri Colpi =

French film editor and film director

- Born: 15 July 1921; Brigue, Switzerland
- Died: 14 January 2006 (aged 84); Menton, France
- Occupations: Film director, film editor
- Known for: The Long Absence

Henri Colpi (French: [kɔlpi]; 15 July 1921 – 14 January 2006) was a French film editor and film director.

== Early life ==
Colpi graduated from the IDHEC in 1947. During 1950 to 1960, he edited films for such notable French New Wave directors as Agnès Varda and Georges Franju.

== Career ==
Colpi directed the 1961 film Une aussi longue absence, which is well known for sharing the Palme d'Or at the 1961 Cannes Film Festival with Viridiana, directed by Luis Buñuel. Une aussi longue absence was written by Marguerite Duras, featured Alida Valli in a major role, and included music by Georges Delerue. It also won the Louis Delluc Prize in 1960. His second feature Codine was also screening in competition at the 1963 Cannes Film Festival, where Colpi won the prize for Best Screenplay.

Colpi is also noted as a film editor with about 20 credits, including Alain Resnais' films Hiroshima mon amour (1959) and L'Année dernière à Marienbad (1961). He edited André Antoine's forgotten film L'Hirondelle et la Mésange (The Swallow and the Titmouse) to a 79-minute feature that premiered in 1984. Antoine initially shot six hours of footage.

In addition to directing, editing, acting, sound recording, and a variety of functions in the post-War years, he was featured in a French television series, L'Histoire du cinéma français par ceux qui l'ont fait (The History of French Cinema By Those Who Made It) in 1974, and he continued to work into the 1990s.

== Filmography ==
(as director)

- 1961 The Long Absence (Une aussi longue absence)
- 1963 Codine
- 1965 Mona, l'étoile sans nom (Steaua fără nume)
- 1967 Symphonie Nr. 3 Es-Dur opus 55 (Eroica) von Ludwig van Beethoven (documentary)
- 1970 Happy He Who Like Ulysses
- 1973 The Mysterious Island
