= Strangers in the City (1962 film) =

- Directed by: Rick Carrier
- Written by: Rick Carrier; Elgin Ciampi
- Produced by: Rick Carrier; Elgin Ciampi; Ronald Shedlo
- Starring: Camilo Delgado; Robert Gentile; Rosita De Triano; Greta Margos
- Cinematography: Rick Carrier
- Edited by: Stan Russell
- Music by: Robert Prince
- Production companies: Carrier Productions; Embassy Pictures
- Distributed by: Embassy Pictures
- Release date: July 16, 1962
- Running time: 83 minutes
- Country: United States
- Language: English

Strangers in the City is a 1962 American feature drama film produced, photographed, written and directed by Rick Carrier. The film was screened at the 1st International Critics' Week of the 1962 Cannes Film Festival.
