= The Magnificent Concubine =

1962 Hong Kong film by Li Han Hsiang

- Film poster
- Traditional Chinese: 楊貴妃
- Simplified Chinese: 杨贵妃
- Hanyu Pinyin: Yáng Guìfēi
- Jyutping: Joeng^{4} Gwai^{3}fei^{1}
- Directed by: Li Han Hsiang
- Written by: Wong Chik-Boh
- Produced by: Doven Chow; Runme Shaw
- Starring: Hsin Yen Chao; Wen Shin Chen; Bin He; Wen Chung Ku; Hsiang Chun Li
- Cinematography: Tadashi Nishimoto
- Edited by: Chiang Hsing-lung
- Music by: Wang Shun
- Production company: Shaw Brothers
- Release date: 31 May 1962 (Hong Kong)
- Running time: 103 minutes
- Country: Hong Kong
- Language: Mandarin

The Magnificent Concubine (pinyin: Yáng Guìfēi, lit. "Yang Guifei") is a 1962 Hong Kong drama film. This movie was filmed in color. It was directed by Li Han Hsiang and is a remake of the 1955 Kenji Mizoguchi film Yōkihi. The Magnificent Concubine was entered into the 1962 Cannes Film Festival. It was the first Chinese-language film to win the Grand Prix for Best Interior Photography and Color.

== Cast ==
- Hsin Yen Chao
- Wen Shin Chen
- Bin He
- Wen Chung Ku
- Hsiang Chun Li
- Li Li-hua
- Ching Lin
- Ying Li
- Ti Tang
- Chih-Ching Yang
- Chun Yen
- Zhao Lei
- Mu Zhu as Rebellious captain
