= Eddie McConnell =

British filmmaker

Eddie McConnell (15 May 1936 – 12 January 2018) was a Scottish documentary film-maker and cameraman. He was known for his camera work depicting Scottish industry and for his ability to tell authentic stories about the normal, working-class people of his home-town, Glasgow, and later on in his life of those in other parts of the world. A collection of his work from over the last fifty years is held by the National Library of Scotland's Moving Image Archive in Glasgow. A special screening of his films was shown at the Edinburgh International Film Festival in August 2007.

In 2007, McConnell was honoured for his 'Special Contribution to Scottish Film' at the BAFTA Scotland awards ceremony. He won a variety of other awards throughout his lifetime and even participated in an Oscar-award winning short Seawards the Great Ships (1961) as a cameraman.

== Biography ==
McConnell was born in Glasgow to his mother Margaret McConnell and his father, Edward McConnell, who was the head teacher of a local primary school. He attended St Gerard's Secondary School in Govan. He also attended St. Aloysuis College in Garnethill. After leaving secondary school McConnell was accepted into Glasgow School of Art in 1954 and went on to become a successful cameraman and documentary film-maker.

McConnell died at the age of 81 in Queen Elizabeth University Hospital, while planning another film, one about street musicians from all over Europe. He is survived by his son and daughter, Michael and Clare McConnell, and his three grandchildren. Before he died he asked those who were able not to bring him flowers or sympathy but 'only, if desired, donations to the Glasgow School of Art Mackintosh Building Restoration Fund or the National Library of Scotland/Moving Image Archive.'

== Work and education ==
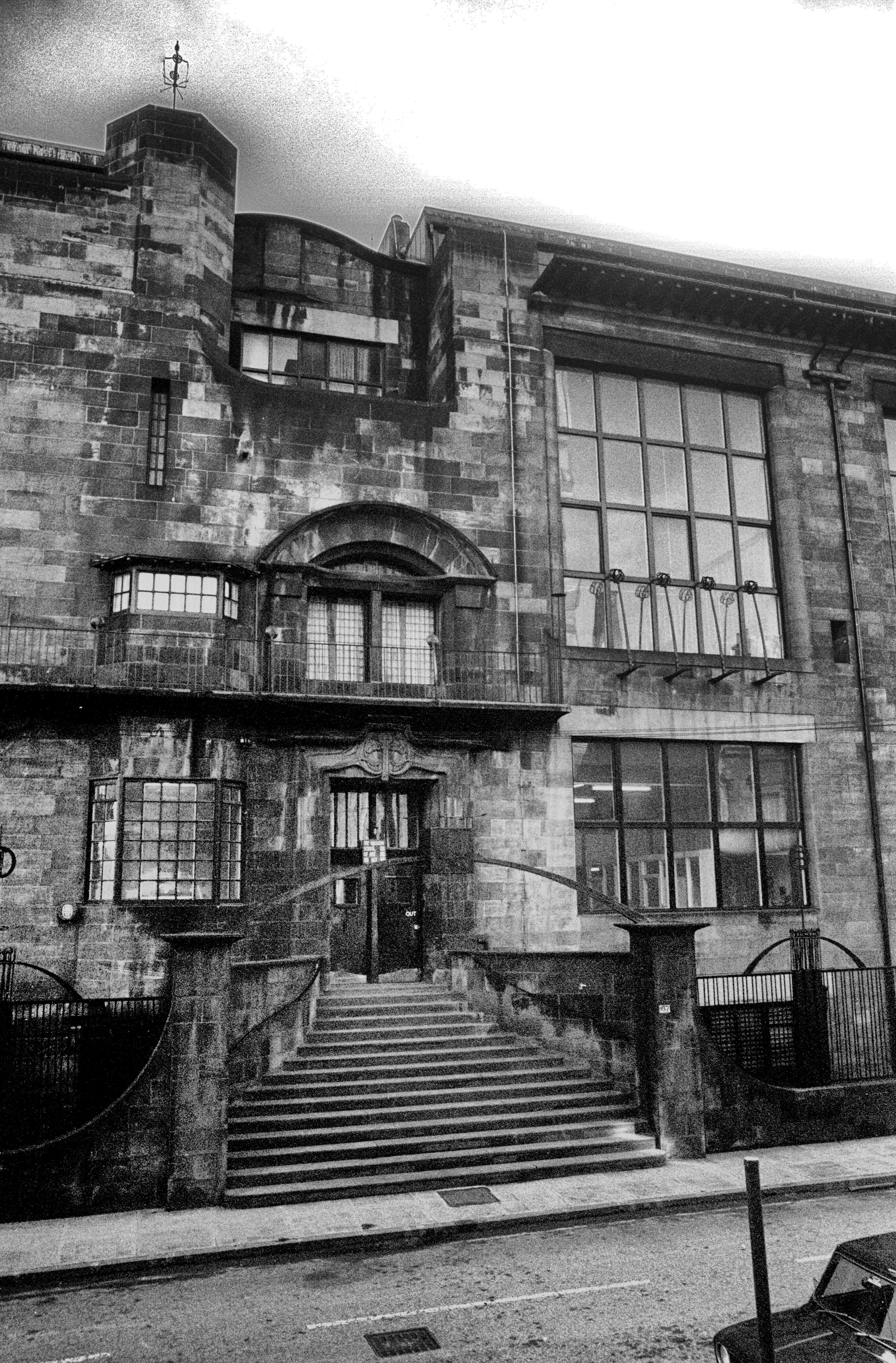
Glasgow School of Art, 1979

McConnell attended the Glasgow School of Art (GSA) from 1954 to 1959 where he studied sculpture under Benno Schotz. McConnell filmed his first ever documentary there in 1957, a film depicting the experience of his fellow student artists who studied at the school. The film was silent and had a running time of 17 minutes. While he was a student, McConnell hitch-hiked to film festivals all over Europe and became inspired by the experimental short films that he saw. He also started his own society at GSA showing some of the avant-garde movies from his trip.

McConnell filmed Faces in 1959 in which he got costume design help from Alasdair Gray, also a student at GSA at the time, who made the masks for the movie. The film was shown at both Edinburgh Film Festival and London Film Festival and grabbed the attention of Scottish documentary pioneer John Grierson, who helped him name his film company, International Film Associates (Scotland).

McConnell established International Film Associates (Scotland) in 1963 with two others who he had previously worked with on occasion as a freelancer at Scottish Television, Laurence Henson and Sydney Harrison, and over few decades they created documentaries and short films for various institutions like the Films of Scotland Committee, the Central Office of Information, and the Children's Film Foundation.

In 1967, McConnell went to Lisbon to film the European Cup final. This was a particularly significant moment for him as Glasgow's Celtic F.C had won the cup for the first time ever. He is said to have taken great pleasure in the applause he received as he left the plane back in his hometown following the event. The team's manager, Jock Stein, allowed McConnell to exit the plane before anyone else so that he could capture the moment on camera, and the crowd cheered for him as he did so.

Almost 20 years after learning from him at school, McConnell began working on a documentary about Schotz, his old sculpture teacher. The film was released in 1973 entitled Benno Schotz: Sculptor and Modeller and depicts him working at his studio in Glasgow talking about his own working methods, as well as his past experience in engineering.

McConnell continued to make films up until he died, some experimental, many about trains - which he loved. Of particular note is McConnell's A Line for All Seasons (1981) narrated by the actor John Shedden, which shows the history of Scotland's West Highland Railway Line. McConnell's passion for trains is demonstrated in his work profusely, especially considering his last broadcast works included the likes of The Emotive Locomotive (1990) and Steaming Passions (1993).

During the final years of his life McConnell dedicated quite a bit of his time to drawing and painting in watercolour. One of his works is hung in Ubiquitous Chip, a restaurant in Glasgow's Ashton Lane.

== Filmography ==
=== As director ===
- The Glasgow School of Art (1957)
- Glasgow Taxi Drivers Outing (1960)
- A Kind of Seeing (1967)
- Topliner: The Manufacture of Industrial Refractories (1968)
- A Line for All Seasons (1970)
- Benno Schotz: Sculptor and Modeller (1973)
- The Pine Tree (1974)
- Second Glance Hands (1983)
- Shell Shock (1991)

=== As cameraman ===
- Prosperous Path (1959)
- Pleasure Island (1960) - assistant cameraman
- Loch Lomond (1967)
- Look to the Sea (1970)
- Sea City - Greenock (1974)
- In Great Waters (1974)
- The Boat (1975)
- Consequences (1976) - lighting cameraman
- A Stone in the Heather (1976)
- Giving Voice: A Writer in the Classroom (1976)
- Communication (1977)
- I am (1978)
- Love, Love, Love (1978)
- The Cromarty Bridge (1979)
- The Spirit of Scotland (1979)
- They're Always Picking on Us (1980)
- Male and Female (1980)
