= Francisco Regueiro =

Spanish film director (born 1934)

- Born: 2 August 1934 (age 92); Valladolid, Spain
- Occupations: Film director Screenwriter
- Years active: 1962–1993

Francisco Regueiro (born 2 August 1934) is a Spanish film director and screenwriter. He directed twelve films between 1962 and 1993.

== Selected filmography ==
- The Good Love (1963)
- Padre nuestro (1985)
- Diario de invierno (1987)
- Madregilda (1993)
