= Embassy Pictures =

Former American film and distribution company

Embassy Pictures Corporation

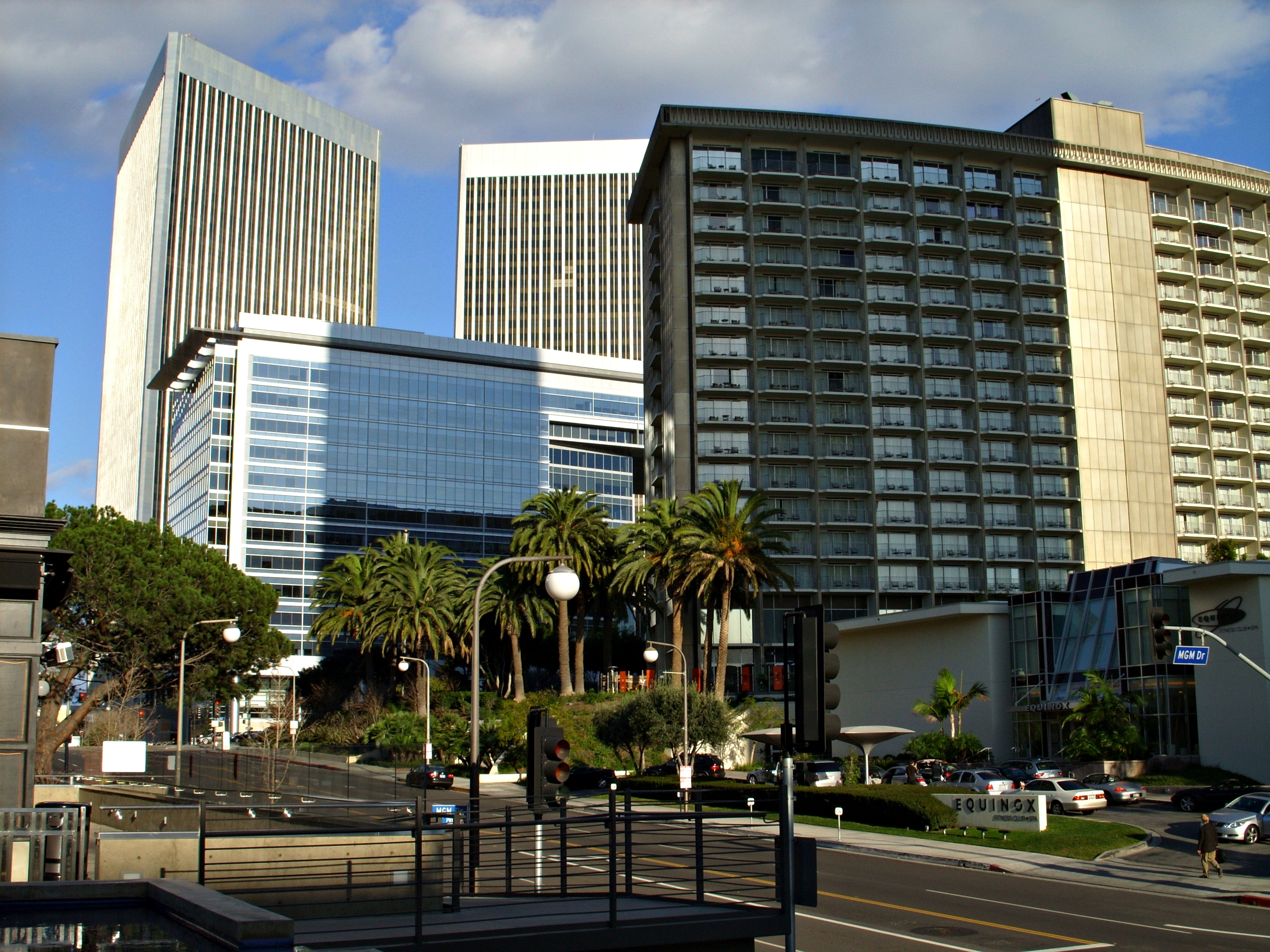
- Headquarters at Century City, Los Angeles
- Industry: Film studio
- Founded: 1942; 84 years ago
- Founder: Joseph E. Levine
- Defunct: 1986; 40 years ago
- Fate: Acquired by Dino De Laurentiis Productions and folded into De Laurentiis Entertainment Group
- Successor: De Laurentiis Entertainment Group
- Headquarters: 1901 Avenue of the Stars; Los Angeles, California
- Products: Motion pictures
- Parent: Avco Corporation (1967–1982); Embassy Communications, Inc. (1982–1985); The Coca-Cola Company (June–October 1985); Dino De Laurentiis Productions (1985–1986)
- Divisions: Embassy Television; Embassy Home Entertainment; Charter Entertainment

Embassy Pictures Corporation (also known as Avco Embassy Pictures as well as Embassy Films Associates) was an American independent film production and distribution company, which was active from 1942 to 1986. Embassy was responsible for films such as The Graduate, The Producers, The Fog, The Howling, Escape from New York, This Is Spinal Tap, and Swamp Thing, and television series such as The Jeffersons, One Day at a Time, and The Facts of Life.

Embassy was founded in 1942 by Joseph E. Levine as a foreign film distributor, before branching into film production in 1945.

In 1967, Embassy was acquired by Avco. The company struggled in the 1970s before changing focus to lower-budget genre films at the end of the decade. In 1982, television producer Norman Lear and his partner Jerry Perenchio bought the studio, and it became involved in television production. In 1985, Embassy was sold to The Coca-Cola Company, who sold the studio to Dino De Laurentiis in October of that same year.

Today, StudioCanal owns ancillary rights to the majority of Embassy's theatrical library, while Sony Pictures owns worldwide television syndication rights to the studio's films and television shows.

== History ==
=== From founding to success ===
The company was founded in 1942 by Joseph E. Levine, initially to distribute foreign films in the United States. The company entered film production in 1945, co-producing with Maxwell Finn the documentary Gaslight Follies, a compilation of silent film clips narrated by Ben Grauer.

Embassy found success in 1956 bringing the Japanese film Godzilla to the American general public (in a re-edited version), acquiring the rights for $12,000 and spending $400,000 promoting it under the title Godzilla, King of the Monsters!, and earning $1 million in theatrical rentals. They then made a $100,000 deal to bring the French-Italian film Attila (1954) to the United States in 1958 and spent $600,000 promoting it, which returned $2 million in rentals. Their breakthrough came the following year with Hercules, starring Steve Reeves and released by Warner Bros. Levine invested $120,000 on dubbing, sound effects and new titles and spent $1.25 million on promoting the film. It was one of the highest-grossing films of the year, with rentals of $4.7 million, starting a growth in the sword-and-sandal genre.

=== Art house releases ===
After releasing the Hercules sequel, Hercules Unchained (1960), Embassy expanded to add 13 offices nationally as well as offices in Rome, London and Paris and signed deals with Italian production company Titanus and producer Carlo Ponti and began distributing art films, often European ones. In 1961, Embassy bought North American distribution rights for Two Women after Levine seeing no more than three minutes of its "rushes". The film, based on a novella written by Alberto Moravia, had been directed by Vittorio de Sica, and starred Sophia Loren (Ponti's wife) and Eleanora Brown, who acted out the respective roles of a mother and her young daughter whom World War II had displaced from their home. Levine's promotional campaign focused on one still photograph, which showed Loren, as the mother, wearing a torn dress, kneeling in the dirt, and weeping with rage and grief. Predicting that she would win the Academy Award for her performance, Levine brought Loren to the United States for interviews, bought space for, and placed, large advertisements in newspapers, and saw to it that Two Women appeared in the cities of residence of Academy Award jury members.

Levine's efforts paid off when the film was a hit and Loren became the first cast member of a foreign-language film to win the Academy Award for Best Actress. Embassy also acquired rights to and distributed Divorce Italian Style (1961); Salvatore Giuliano (1962); Federico Fellini's film 8½ (1963), as well as Ponti's producing credits including Boccaccio '70 (1962), and de Sica's Yesterday, Today and Tomorrow (1963) and Marriage Italian Style (1964). Embassy also produced an adaptation of The Thief of Baghdad (1961), also with Reeves in the lead, and Rick Carrier's Strangers in the City (1962).

On the back of the success of Ingmar Bergman, Embassy released some of his earlier films in the United States, his film The Devil's Wanton (1949) in 1962 and his film Night Is My Future (1948) in 1963. Embassy also released two 1961 films produced by Robert S. Baker and Monty Berman - What a Carve Up! (released in 1962) and The Hellfire Club (released in 1963). Other Ponti-produced films released by Embassy include Landru (1963), directed by Claude Chabrol; Contempt (1963), directed by Jean-Luc Godard; The Empty Canvas starring Bette Davis; The Ape Woman (1964); Casanova 70 (1965); The 10th Victim (1965); and de Sica's Sunflower (1970).

=== Paramount Pictures deal-era ===
By the 1960s, Levine had transformed Embassy into a production company. In 1963, Levine was offered a $30 million deal with Paramount Pictures to produce films in the vein of his previous successes. Paramount would finance the films and Embassy would receive part of its profits. Under the deal, Levine produced Harold Robbins's The Carpetbaggers (1964) and its prequel Nevada Smith (1966), which were successes, along with flops such as Harlow (1965), starring Carroll Baker. A third film based on a novel by Harold Robbins was also released as part of three-picture deal with Robbins, Where Love Has Gone (1964).

Embassy also released several films produced by or starring Stanley Baker including Zulu (1964), Dingaka (1965) and Robbery (1967).

Later in the decade, Embassy functioned on its own with many Rankin/Bass Productions animated features, including The Daydreamer (1966) and Mad Monster Party? (1967), and successful live-action productions including The Graduate, by second-time film director Mike Nichols, The Producers, by first-time director Mel Brooks (both 1967), and The Lion in Winter (1968), which won an Academy Award for Katharine Hepburn.

=== New ownership under Avco ===
Avco Embassy Pictures logo, used from 1968 to 1982

Embassy enjoyed its greatest success with The Graduate, which became the highest-grossing film of the year. This enabled Levine to sell his company to Avco for a deal worth $40 million, although he stayed on as chief executive.

In 1969, Embassy appointed Mike Nichols to the board of directors and acquired his film production company, Friwaftt. Levine also ended a four-year feud with Ponti and Loren and produced Loren's first film since she became a mother, Sunflower (1970).

Levine also started a record label with music industry executives Hugo Peretti and Luigi Creatore, Avco Embassy Records, later shortened to Avco Records. In 1969, the company bought out Mike Nichols' production company and signed him to make two movies.

The company became less successful in the 1970s and only had hits with Mike Nichols' Carnal Knowledge (1971) and A Touch of Class (1973). In 1972, the company had begun cutting back on production and in 1973 recorded a loss of $8.1 million. Levine resigned as president in 1974 to re-enter independent production and was replaced by Bill Chaikin. By 1975, Avco Embassy stopped making movies altogether.

In 1968, Avco Embassy launched Avco Embassy Television, to syndicate films from the Avco Embassy library on television. In 1976, Avco Embassy sold their broadcasting division and Avco Program Sales to Multimedia, Inc., becoming Multimedia Entertainment (since folded into what is now NBCUniversal Syndication Studios).

=== Robert Rehme years ===
In late 1977, Avco Embassy announced its intention to resume production. In 1978, Robert Rehme was appointed president and chief operating officer and he convinced the company to give him $5 million for a production fund.

Under his stewardship, Avco Embassy concentrated on lower budgeted genre films, six of which were successful: The Manitou (1978), Phantasm (1979), The Fog (1980), Scanners (1981), Time Bandits (1981) and The Howling (1981). They benefited in part from the fact that American International Pictures recently left the exploitation field, lessening competition in this area.

Rehme left the company in 1981, having seen it increase its revenue from $20 million to $90 million.

In 1981, Tom Laughlin offered to buy the company for $24 million but withdrew his offer.

=== Norman Lear and Jerry Perenchio ===
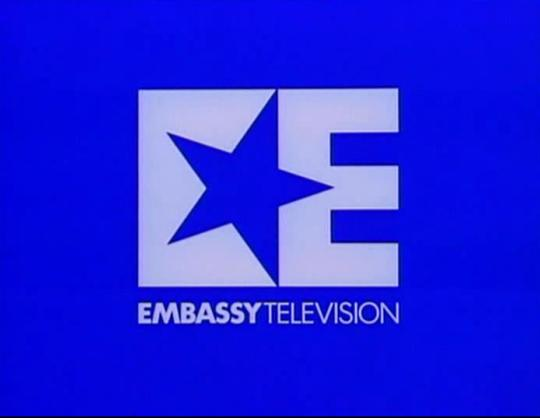
Embassy Television logo, used from 1982 to 1984

In January 1982, television producer Norman Lear and his partner Jerry Perenchio bought the studio for $25 million, reverted the name to the previous Embassy Pictures by dropping off "Avco", and renamed T.A.T. Communications Company as Embassy Communications, Inc. and T.A.T. Communications Productions as Embassy Television and its distributor as Embassy Telecommunications. The company was producing such hits as The Jeffersons, One Day at a Time and The Facts of Life, and by Tandem, Diff'rent Strokes and Archie Bunker's Place. During this period, they launched Silver Spoons, Square Pegs, Who's the Boss?, It's Your Move and Gloria. They also expanded into making made-for-TV movies, including Eleanor, First Lady of the World (1982) and Grace Kelly (1983).

In late 1982, Embassy bought out Andre Blay Corporation and renamed the company as Embassy Home Entertainment; prior releases from its film catalog (as Avco Embassy Picture Corporation) had been handled through Magnetic Video, as well as reissues of the Blay Video catalog.

In 1984, Embassy Pictures was renamed as Embassy Films Associates. That same year, Fanny and Alexander, which it distributed in the United States, received the Academy Award for Best Foreign Language Film.

During this period, Rob Reiner, who up to that point had been most famous for playing Michael "Meathead" Stivic on All in the Family, began his directorial career with two Embassy releases, This is Spinal Tap (1984) and The Sure Thing (1985). His third film, Stand By Me (1986), started at Embassy, but it almost got cancelled because of the sale to Columbia days before filming was to begin. Norman Lear ended up putting up his own money for completion funds.

=== Coca-Cola period and closure ===
Lear and Perenchio sold Embassy Communications (including Tandem Productions) to The Coca-Cola Company for $485 million on June 18, 1985. Coca-Cola, which also owned Columbia Pictures at the time, sold Embassy Pictures to Dino De Laurentiis on November 1, 1985, but kept Embassy's television division active. De Laurentiis folded the company into his De Laurentiis Entertainment Group, and the home video division became Nelson Entertainment, run by executives who had previously worked at DEG before it went bankrupt.

Although De Laurentiis was now owner of Embassy, he was not given rights to then-upcoming films such as Crimewave and Saving Grace (both 1986), and an adaptation of Stephen King's The Body, which became Stand by Me (1986), which became properties of Lear and Perenchio.

By the early 1990s, key rights to the Embassy library transferred from company to company due to the bankruptcies of the companies that separately owned them (De Laurentiis for theatrical, Nelson for home video). Dino De Laurentiis's assets went to Parafrance International, in conjunction with Village Roadshow, while Nelson's assets were acquired by Crédit Lyonnais Bank and later sold to PolyGram. Nelson's parent company, NHI continued to exist well into the mid-1990s. In 1994, Parafrance's assets were acquired by the French production company StudioCanal which today owns ancillary rights to the majority of the Embassy theatrical library. However, North American video rights to the majority of Embassy's film library are owned by Amazon MGM Studios via its Orion Pictures subsidiary due to them acquiring most of PolyGram's pre-March 31, 1996 film library which included the Epic catalog, which in turn incorporated the Nelson catalog, while Sony Pictures Television owns worldwide television syndication rights to the theatrical library as well as full ancillary and distribution rights to the Embassy Television library.
