= Hugo Niebeling =

German film director and producer

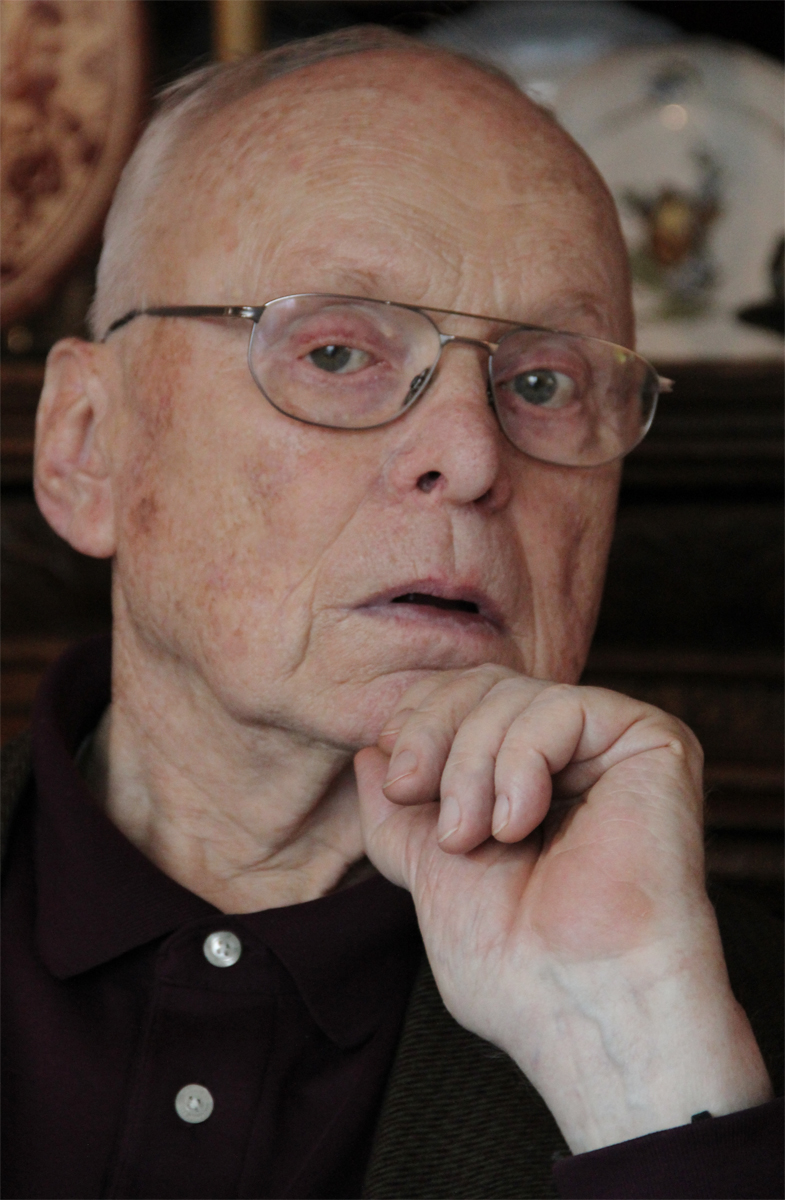
- Hugo Niebeling in December 2014.
- Born: 2 February 1931; Düsseldorf, Germany
- Died: 9 July 2016 (aged 85); Hilden, Germany
- Occupations: Film director Film producer
- Years active: 1956 – 2016
- Awards: See list of awards in the article.

Hugo Niebeling (2 February 1931 – 9 July 2016) was a German film director and producer. He had been particularly noted for his work on industrial and music films, and is considered one of the most important renewers of these genres in Germany. His style is credited to have influenced and helped create the modern music video. His feature-film documentary Alvorada was nominated for an Academy Award in 1963.

== Biography ==
=== Early life ===
Hugo Niebeling was born and raised in Düsseldorf. As a child, he was evacuated to the countryside during World War II. Once the war ended and he returned home, he found his parents' music store destroyed by bombs. Niebeling developed an interest in modern art, classical music and theatre, but was unable to study acting for financial reasons, and therefore enrolled in a business degree at the Mannesmann-AG in Düsseldorf. Parallel to that, he studied acting privately with Otto Ströhlin, an actor at the Düsseldorf Schauspielhaus who had many pupils. Niebeling's role model was Gustaf Gründgens, a famous theatre actor.

=== Industrial/Experimental films ===
In 1957, Niebeling directed his first film Stählerne Adern, a documentary about steel-production at Mannesmann AG, inspired by the German experimental director Walter Ruttmann. This film won many accolades and led to Niebeling directing numerous much-acclaimed industrial and experimental films during the early 1960s. They combine stylized cinematography and editing with experimental scores, often in collaboration with Oskar Sala. His short film Stahl - Thema mit Variationen is a good example, being an audiovisual poem on steel-production, using only sound and image to explain its subject without any voice-over or other narration. In 1962, Niebeling created the Oscar-nominated documentary Alvorada - Brazil's Changing Face, which received numerous awards. His experimental industrial film Petrol was the only West German film screened at Cannes Film Festival 1965, and went on to become one of the most awarded industrial films worldwide.

Hugo Niebeling created a radical Oscar-nominated editing style that predated, influenced, and informed the 1960s experimental, underground, and new psychedelic cinema, helping to create the modern music video.

— Hollywood Reel Independent Film Festival, program-guide to retrospective of Niebeling's industrial films in 2016.

No technique, no angle, no method of camera transport has been left unexplored. What results is an exciting and beautiful kaleidoscope of images.

— Melbourne Film Festival, about "Alvorada".

=== Ballet-Films ===
Giselle, Niebeling's first ballet-film featuring Carla Fracci, Erik Bruhn and the American Ballet Theatre, premiered in 1969 at the Lincoln Centre in New York under patronage of Jacqueline Kennedy Onassis and was praised for its innovative visual style that complements the ballet-performance.

In 1991, Niebeling directed a feature-film in Germany showing the passion of Christ based on Bach's Johannespassion, evoking antique tragedy with its combination of music, language and dance. Niebeling planned it for three decades prior to realizing it, and himself considers it one of his most important works.

Niebeling's experiment is a coherent masterpiece.

— Filmbewertungsstelle Wiesbaden, in 1970 about "Giselle".

=== 2000s: Retrospectives and new projects ===
==== Retrospectives ====
2013, the German Historical Museum did a retrospective on Hugo Niebeling. He was present for the screenings, and films from all stages of his career were shown. In 2015, Hollywood Reel Independent Film Festival awarded him with its "Award of Excellence" for artistic innovation. In a retrospective during the festival, many of Niebeling's 1960s works were shown, some of them as US-premieres.

==== Restoring earlier films ====
Since the early 2000s, Niebeling had many of his earlier works scanned in 2k or 4k from the original 35mm negatives, and they were color corrected and restored under his supervision. At the time of his death, he had already scanned and restored all his 1960s works plus some of his later works like Der Auftrag der uns bleibt (1984) and Johannespassion (1991).

==== Chaconne ====
Until his death, Hugo Niebeling continued to be active as a director, planning numerous new projects. Of particular interest for him was a proposed film on Bach's Chaconne, which he had already planned in detail and which would have interwoven nature and church architecture through montage and cinematography.

== Industrial Films: Filmography and Awards ==
- Stählerne Adern, Lebensadern unserer Zeit, 1956

- Bundesfilmpreis 1957, Filmband in Gold, Category: Best feature-length cultural- and documentary-film (Mannesmann AG)

- Frohe Farben, Gute Laune (BASF, 1957)

Niebeling's second work as a director. Commissioned by Bavaria Film.

- Stahl bändigt Atome, Vom Bau des Reaktor-Druckgefäßes Kahl, 1960
- Steel - Variations on a Theme (Stahl - Thema mit Variationen), 1960

- Bundesfilmpreis 1961, Filmband in Gold, Category: Bester Sonstiger Kurzfilm (Mannesmann AG).

- Alvorada – Brazil's changing face (Alvorada - Aufbruch in Brasilien), 1962

- Two Bundesfilmpreis, Filmbands in Gold, 1963:

- Category: Bester Director (Hugo Niebeling)
- Category: Best feature-length cultural- and documentary-film (Mannesmann AG)

- Oscar Nomination, 1963 in the Category: "Documentary Feature". (Feature)
- West-German entry to the Cannes Film Festival, 1963
- Official Selection, Melbourne International Film Festival 1964

- Petrol, Carburant, Kraftstoff (Aral AG, 1964/65)

- West-German entry to the Cannes Film Festival, 1965
- Grand Prix, Melbourne International Film Festival 1967
- Gold Award: Chicago International Film Festival

- Magic Light (Mit Licht schreiben - Photographein), (Agfa-Gevaert, 1967)

- Official Selection, Melbourne International Film Festival 1969

- Allegro (Aral AG, 1969/70)

- Prädikat „Besonders Wertvoll“, Filmbewertungsstelle Wiesbaden, 1969
- Short Film Award Buenos Aires, 1971
- Official Selection, Melbourne International Film Festival 1971

- The Task Still Facing Us (Der Auftrag der uns bleibt), (Bayer AG, 1982/83)
- So schließt sich der Kreis, 100 Jahre Berufsgenossenschaft (BG Chemie, 1986)

== Music- and Ballett-films: Filmography and Awards ==
- Pastorale (1967)
- Giselle (1969)
- Percussion for six (1971)
- Violin concerto (1974)
- Duo Concertant
- Serenade, eine spätromantische Erinnerung
- Johannespassion „Es wäre gut, dass ein Mensch würde umbracht für das Volk“, (1991)
- Klage der Ariadne (1993)

- "Wertvoll“, Filmbewertungsstelle Wiesbaden

- Eroica - Director's Cut (2009)

- "Wertvoll“, Filmbewertungsstelle Wiesbaden

- Apotheosis of Dance (2015)

- "Besonders Wertvoll“, Filmbewertungsstelle Wiesbaden

- "B 7" (Beethoven Seven) (2016)

== External links and sources ==
- German Historical Museum - Retrospective 2013
- Hediger, Vinzenz; Vonderau, Patrick (Hg.): Filmische Mittel, industrielle Zwecke. Das Werk des Industriefilms. (= Dokumentarfilminitiative im Filmbüro NRW (Hg.): Texte zum Dokumentarfilm. Bd. 11), Berlin 2007.
- Hofmann, Paul (Bearb.): Nordrhein-Westfälisches Hauptstaatsarchiv (Hg.): Filmschätzen auf der Spur. Verzeichnis historischer Filmbestände in Nordrhein-Westfalen. 2. erw. Auflage. Düsseldorf 1997. (=Veröffentlichungen der Staatlichen Archive des Landes Nordrhein-Westfalen. Reihe C: Quellen und Forschungen. Band 33)
- Rasch, Manfred u.a. (Hg.): Industriefilm 1948–1959. Filme aus den Wirtschaftsarchiven im Ruhrgebiet. Essen 2003.
- Thommes, Joachim: „In jeden dieser Filme wollte ich Kunst reinbringen, soviel ich nur konnte.“ Hugo Niebeling, die Mannesmann-Filmproduktion und der bundesdeutsche Wirtschaftsfilm 1947–1987, Norderstedt 2008, ISBN 978-3-8370-8257-9.
- Thommes, Joachim: "Erregend wie ein Abenteuerfilm." Hugo Niebelings brasilianisches Epos ALVORADA (1962). In: Filmblatt, 16. Jg., Nr. 45 Sommer 2011, ISSN 1433-2051, S. 51–60.
- Journalistenbüro Zeitzeuge
- Mannesmann-Archiv
- Hugo Niebeling at IMDb
