= Witold Giersz =

Polish animator (born 1927)

Witold Giersz (born 26 February 1927 in Poraj, near Częstochowa) is a Polish animator. His most well-known work is Koń, which won an award at the Cracow Film Festival "for its exceptionally interesting animation technique". A documentary film about Giersz was made in 2012 by Maciej Kur

== Selected films ==
- Neonowa Fraszka (February 1, 1959)
- Skarb Czarnego Jack'a (1961)
- Mały Western (January 2, 1961)
- Dinozaury (February 28, 1963)
- Czerwone I Czarne (June 1, 1964)
- The Horse (Koń, January 2, 1967)
- Kaskader (1972)
- The Old Cowboy (Stary Kowboj, 1973)
- Pożar (January 2, 1975)
- Please, Mr. Elephant (Proszę słonia, December 31, 1980)
- A Little Curious segments (1998–2001)
