= The Thief of Baghdad (1961 film) =

- Directed by: Arthur Lubin
- Written by: Augusto Frassinetti; Filippo Sanjust; Bruno Vailati
- Produced by: Bruno Vitali
- Starring: Steve Reeves
- Cinematography: Tonino Delli Colli
- Edited by: Gene Ruggiero
- Music by: Carlo Rustichelli
- Production companies: Titanus; Lux Compagnie Cinématographique de France
- Distributed by: Metro-Goldwyn-Mayer (U.S.)
- Release date: August 1961 (New York City)
- Running time: 100 minutes (Italy); 90 mins (U.S.)
- Countries: United States; Italy; France
- Languages: English; Italian
- Box office: $1 million (US)

The Thief of Baghdad (Italian: Il ladro di Bagdad) is a 1961 film directed by Arthur Lubin and starring Steve Reeves.

== Plot ==
In the time of the Arabian Nights, the city of Baghdad was ruled by Sultan Ali Bajazeth but actually controlled by the scheming Grand Vizier Ghamal. The poor of Baghdad are aided by Karim, the Thief of Baghdad.

Prince Osman is due to arrive at the palace to ask for the hand of Sultan Ali's daughter Amina in marriage. Karim sneaks into the palace, waylays Osman, and impersonates the prince, using the opportunity to steal jewels from all of the assembled courtiers. When this is discovered, Karim hides in Princess Amina's quarters. When her attendants leave, Karim reveals himself to her, and the two are immediately drawn to each other (she believes that he is Prince Osman). The following night, Karim secretly returns to the palace. He meets with Amina, and they declare their love for each other. Climbing down into a courtyard to escape the guards, he lands in the middle of a group of prisoners condemned to slavery in the Desert Mills and is dragged off with them.

Ghamal gives Osman a potion to make Amina fall in love with him, but she falls dangerously ill after drinking it. An old man appears and says that the only way Amina can be cured is for her to be given a blue rose by someone who truly loves her and whom she truly loves. The blue rose can only be found by passing through the Seven Doors. The sultan proclaims that the quest for the blue rose is open to all.

At the Mills, Karim learns of Amina's illness and escapes. Returning to Baghdad, he is told by the old man about the quest. He tries to join the assembled suitors but is recognized. Karim steals a horse and sets off.

The suitors make camp for the night. Karim camps nearby and slips into the camp to steal food and water. Osman secretly slits the waterbags of the other suitors.

The next day, the other suitors are beginning to die of thirst. Karim shares his water with them, and the First Door appears. They ride through and find themselves in a forest. That night, the trees come to life and attack them. Most of the suitors flee, but Karim uses a torch to fight off the trees, after which the Second Door appears. It leads to a plain of sulphurous geysers that erupt into a ring of fire. Karim realizes that this is an illusion and uses a rock to smash through, finding the Third Door.

The Third Door leads to the Palace of Kadeejah, a beautiful woman who tempts Karim to give up the quest and remain with her. Karim realizes that Kadeejah and her palace are a trap and finds the Fourth Door in a seaside cave. Meanwhile, Osman attacks Baghdad, and Ghamal turns traitor and joins Osman.

The Fourth Door leads to a bridge over a high chasm with a raging estuary far below. An invisible man exits the Fifth Door on the other side of the bridge and nearly strangles Karim to death before Karim removes the magic cloak that grants his opponent invisibility! Karim throws his brutal-looking opponent off the bridge. Whereupon, he enters the Fifth Door and sees that it leads him to a winged horse. Faced with the horse's overwhelming number of faceless sword-wielding guardians, he dons the invisibility cloak and thereby mounts the flying horse. On the bare back of which he travels to a castle in the clouds where he finds the blue rose behind the Sixth Door. He is immediately transported back to the desert, via the Seventh Door, where the old man is waiting with Karim's horse. The man gives Karim a magic jewel, telling him it will grant him one wish.

Osman demands that Sultan Ali surrender Baghdad, threatening Amina. Karim arrives and uses the magic jewel to create an army of Karims, which, armed only with clubs, defeats Osman and his army. Unfortunately, during the battle, Osman's sword destroys the Blue Rose. Osman and his army flee.

Karim rescues Amina and returns her to her father. The Blue Rose is destroyed, but Karim plucks a white rose and gives it to Amina, telling her that if she truly loves him, then it is blue. She takes the rose and tells him that it is blue, and it immediately turns blue, curing her. The sultan welcomes Karim as his son-in-law and successor. Karim sees a bust of the mysterious old man, but the sultan tells him that it is a bust of his late uncle, the great Sultan Achim I.

== Cast ==
- Steve Reeves – Karim
- Giorgia Moll – Amina (as Georgia Moll)
- Edy Vessel – Kadeejah
- Arturo Dominici – Prince Osman
- Daniele Vargas – Gamal
- Antonio Battistella – Sultan of Baghdad
- Fanfulla – Abdul (as Luigi Visconti)
- Giancarlo Zarfati – Farid
- Gina Mascetti – Governess
- George Chamarat – White Old Magician

== Production ==
The film was partly financed by Joseph E. Levine with Titanus. Filming was to have started in Rome on 15 July 1960. The start date was pushed back to August. Filming also took place in Tunisia.

Lubin later said "the location was interesting but the picture was hard work... the producer had never made a movie before and the company was running out of money. I had a complete Italian crew and I didn't speak the language. So the work was difficult. By the time I got to Tunis I had wised up. I had two assistant directors – one who spoke French and one who spoke Tunisian. We were 100 miles into the desert and got up at five in the morning before the sun got too high for us to work."

== Reception ==
The Los Angeles Times called it "a creaking vehicle." The New York Times called it "a great big Eastman coloured dumb show" which "moves at a snail's pace in cardboard oriental settings."

Diabolique magazine said the film "has bright colours and Tunisian locations but is hurt by a wonky screenplay and uncertainty how much fantasy to put in."

== Novelization ==
A novelization of the film was written by Richard Wormser and published by Dell Paperbacks in 1961.

The novelization is told in the first person from the point of view of Abu Hastin, the jinni of Baghdad (who takes the place of the old man from the film and is more involved in the novelization than his counterpart in the film). The novelization creates new characters such as The Lady Jinni of the Rocky Sands (who helps the Jinni of Baghdad create the Quest's tests and is the Jinni of Baghdad's love interest), Karim's scholarly but crippled older brother Malek and The Hairy (or evil) Jinni of Mossul (identified as Osman's home city). The novelization also alters some of the film's characters, making Amina's father more foolish that he is in the film, Karim younger and more reckless, and Amina less of the traditional helpless heroine. Some of the film's Quest tests, Amina's kidnapping, and Osman's siege of Baghdad were eliminated from the novelization.

== Biography ==
- Hughes, Howard (2011). Cinema Italiano – The Complete Guide From Classics To Cult. London – New York: I.B.Tauris. ISBN 978-1-84885-608-0.

== See also ==
- List of American films of 1961
