= The Good Love =

1963 Spanish romantic drama film

- Directed by: Francisco Regueiro
- Written by: Francisco Regueiro
- Starring: Simón Andreu
- Cinematography: Juan Julio Baena
- Edited by: Pablo González del Amo
- Release date: 21 November 1963
- Running time: 90 minutes
- Country: Spain
- Language: Spanish

The Good Love (Spanish: El Buen Amor) is a 1963 Spanish romantic drama film directed by Francisco Regueiro. It was entered into the 1963 Cannes Film Festival. The plot follows a young couple spending the day in Toledo.

== Cast ==
- Simón Andreu - José
- Marta del Val - Mari Carmen
- Enriqueta Carballeira - Juanita (as Mª Enriqueta Carballeira)
- Luisa Muñoz
- Enrique Pelayo - Guardia Civil 1
- Chiro Bermejo - Guardia Civil 2
- Esmeralda Adan
- Wifredo Casado - Novio tren
- Juan Torres
- Milagros Guijarro
- Francisco Serrano
- Dolores García Morales
- Francisco Guijar
- Luis Rico
- Mari Paz Yañez
