= List of Cannes Film Festival juries (Feature films) =

Each year, prior to the beginning of each event, the Cannes Film Festival board of directors appoints the juries who hold sole responsibility for choosing which films will receive an award. Jurors are chosen from a wide range of international artists, based on their body of work and respect from their peers. The jury president is an internationally recognized personality of cinema. This list covers the juries for the "Feature films".

== Main Competition ==
An international jury composed of a president and various film, culture, and art personalities, who determine the prizes for the feature films in the competition.

Since 1960, there has been only one personality to get the honor of being president of the jury twice: Jeanne Moreau in 1975 and 1995. The last non-professional film personality to be president of the jury is the American writer William Styron in 1983.

Year	Jury president	Jury members
1946	Georges Huisman; France	Iris Barry, Beaulieu, Antonin Brousil, J. H. J. De Jong, Don Tudor, Samuel Findlater, Sergei Gerasimov, Jan Korngold, Domingos Mascarenhas, Hugo Mauerhofer, Filippo Mennini, Moltke-Hansen, Fernand Rigot, Kjell Stromberg, Rodolfo Usigli, Youssef Wahbi, Helge Wamberg
1947	Georges Huisman; France	Raymond Borderie, Georges Carriere, Jean-François Chosson, Joseph Dotti, Escoute, Jean Grémillon, Maurice Hille, Robert Hubert, Alexandre Kamenka, Jean Mineur, Henri Moret, Jean Nery, Maurice Perisset, Georges Raguis, René Jeanne, Georges Rollin, Régis Roubin, Marc-Gilbert Sauvajon, Segalon, René Sylviano
1949	Georges Huisman; France	Suzanne Borel, Georges Charensol, Paul Colin, Roger Désormière, Jacques-Pierre Frogerais, Étienne Gilson, Paul Gosset, Georges Raguis, René Jeanne, Carlo Rim
1951	André Maurois; France	Suzanne Borel, Louis Chauvet, Evrard de Rouvre, Guy Desson, Jacques Ibert, Gaby Morlay, Georges Raguis, René Jeanne, Carlo Rim, Louis Touchages, Paul Vialar
1952	Maurice Genevoix; France	Tony Aubin, Pierre Billon, Suzanne Borel, Chapelain-Midy, Louis Chauvet, Evrard de Rouvre, Guy Desson, Gabrielle Dorziat, Jean Dréville, Jacques-Pierre Frogerais, André Lang, Jean Mineur, Raymond Queneau, Georges Raguis, Charles Vildrac
1953	Jean Cocteau; France	Louis Chauvet, Titina De Filippo, Guy Desson, Philippe Erlanger, Renée Faure, Jacques-Pierre Frogerais, Abel Gance, André Lang, Georges Raguis, Edward G. Robinson, Charles Spaak, Georges Van Parys
1954	Jean Cocteau; France	Jean Aurenche, André Bazin, Luis Buñuel, Henri Calef, Guy Desson, Philippe Erlanger, Michel Fourre-Cormeray, Jacques-Pierre Frogerais, Jacques Ibert, Georges Lamousse, André Lang, Noël-Noël, Georges Raguis
1955	Marcel Pagnol; France	Marcel Achard, Juan Antonio Bardem, André Dignimont, Jacques-Pierre Frogerais, Leopold Lindtberg, Anatole Litvak, Isa Miranda, Leonard Mosley, Jean Nery, Sergei Yutkevich
1956	Maurice Lehmann; France	Arletty, Louise de Vilmorin, Jacques-Pierre Frogerais, Henri Jeanson, Domenico Meccoli, Otto Preminger, James Quinn, Roger Regent, María Romero, Sergei Vasilyev
1957	André Maurois; France	Dolores del Río, Maurice Genevoix, Georges Huisman, Maurice Lehmann, Marcel Pagnol, Michael Powell, Jules Romains, George Stevens, Vladimir Volchek
1958	Marcel Achard; France	Tomiko Asabuki, Bernard Buffet, Jean de Baroncelli, Helmut Käutner, Dudley Leslie, Madeleine Robinson, Ladislao Vajda, Charles Vidor, Sergei Yutkevich, Cesare Zavattini
1959	Marcel Achard; France	Antoni Bohdziewicz, Michael Cacoyannis, Carlos Cuenca, Pierre Daninos, Julien Duvivier, Max Favalelli, Gene Kelly, Carlo Ponti, Micheline Presle, Sergei Vasilyev
1960	Georges Simenon; Belgium	Marc Allégret, Louis Chauvet, Diego Fabbri, Hidemi Ima, Grigori Kozintsev, Maurice Leroux, Max Lippmann, Henry Miller, Simone Renant, Ulyses Petit de Murat
1961	Jean Giono; France	Pedro Armendáriz, Luigi Chiarini, Tonino Delli Colli, Claude Mauriac, Édouard Molinaro, Jean Paulhan, Raoul Ploquin, Liselotte Pulver, Fred Zinnemann
1962	Tetsurō Furukaki; Japan	Sophie Desmarets, Jean Dutourd, Mel Ferrer, Romain Gary, Jerzy Kawalerowicz, Ernst Krüger, Yuli Raizman, Mario Soldati, François Truffaut
1963	Armand Salacrou; France	Jacqueline Audry, Wilfrid Baumgartner, François Chavane, Jean De Baroncelli, Robert Hossein, Rostislav Yurenev, Kashiko Kawakita, Steven Pallos, Gian Luigi Rondi
1964	Fritz Lang; West Germany	Joaquín Calvo-Sotelo, René Clément, Jean-Jacques Gautier, Alexandre Karaganov, Lorens Marmstedt, Geneviève Page, Raoul Ploquin, Arthur M. Schlesinger Jr., Véra Volmane
1965	Olivia de Havilland; United States	Max Aub, Michel Aubriant, Rex Harrison, François Reichenbach, Alain Robbe-Grillet, Konstantin Simonov, Edmond Ténoudji, Jerzy Toeplitz
1966	Sophia Loren; Italy	Marcel Achard, Vinicius de Moraes, Tetsurō Furukaki, Maurice Genevoix, Jean Giono, Maurice Lehmann, Richard Lester, Denis Marion, André Maurois, Marcel Pagnol, Yuli Raizman, Armand Salacrou, Peter Ustinov
1967	Alessandro Blasetti; Italy	Sergei Bondarchuk, René Bonnell, Jean-Louis Bory, Miklós Jancsó, Claude Lelouch, Shirley MacLaine, Vincente Minnelli, Georges Neveux, Gian Luigi Rondi, Ousmane Sembène
1968	André Chamson; France	Claude Aveline, Boris von Borrezholm, Veljko Bulajić, Paul Cadeac d'Arbaud, Jean Lescure, Louis Malle, Jan Nordlander, Roman Polanski, Robert Rozhdestvensky, Monica Vitti, Terence Young
1969	Luchino Visconti; Italy	Chinghiz Aitmatov, Marie Bell, Jaroslav Boček, Veljko Bulajić, Stanley Donen, Jerzy Glucksman, Robert Kanters, Sam Spiegel
1970	Miguel Ángel Asturias; Guatemala	Guglielmo Biraghi, Kirk Douglas, Christine Gouze-Rénal, Vojtěch Jasný, Félicien Marceau, Sergey Obraztsov, Karel Reisz, Volker Schlöndorff
1971	Michèle Morgan; France	Pierre Billard, Michael Birkett, Anselmo Duarte, István Gaál, Sergio Leone, Aleksandar Petrović, Maurice Rheims, Erich Segal
1972	Joseph Losey; United Kingdom	Bibi Andersson, Georges Auric, Erskine Caldwell, Mark Donskoy, Miloš Forman, Giorgio Papi, Jean Rochereau, Alain Tanner, Naoki Togawa
1973	Ingrid Bergman; Sweden	Jean Delannoy, Lawrence Durrell, Rodolfo Echeverria, Bolesław Michałek, François Nourissier, Leo Pestelli, Sydney Pollack, Robert Rozhdestvensky
1974	René Clair; France	Jean-Loup Dabadie, Kenne Fant, Félix Labisse, Irwin Shaw, Michel Soutter, Monica Vitti, Alexander Walker, Rostislav Yurenev
1975	Jeanne Moreau; France	Anthony Burgess, André Delvaux, Gérard Ducaux-Rupp, George Roy Hill, Léa Massari, Pierre Mazars, Fernando Rey, Pierre Salinger, Yuliya Solntseva
1976	Tennessee Williams; United States	Jean Carzou, Mario Cecchi Gori, Costa-Gavras, András Kovács, Lorenzo López Sancho, Charlotte Rampling, Georges Schehadé, Mario Vargas Llosa
1977	Roberto Rossellini; Italy	N'Sougan Agblemagnon, Anatole Dauman, Jacques Demy, Carlos Fuentes, Benoîte Groult, Pauline Kael, Marthe Keller, Yuri Ozerov
1978	Alan J. Pakula; United States	Franco Brusati, François Chalais, Michel Ciment, Claude Goretta, Andrei Konchalovsky, Harry Saltzman, Liv Ullmann, Georges Wakhévitch
1979	Françoise Sagan; France	Sergio Amidei, Rodolphe-Maurice Arlaud, Luis García Berlanga, Maurice Bessy, Paul Claudon, Jules Dassin, Zsolt Kézdi-Kovács, Robert Rozhdestvensky, Susannah York
1980	Kirk Douglas; United States	Ken Adam, Robert Benayoun, Veljko Bulajić, Leslie Caron, Charles Champlin, André Delvaux, Albina du Boisrouvray, Gian Luigi Rondi, Michael Spencer
1981	Jacques Deray; France	Ellen Burstyn, Jean-Claude Carrière, Robert Chazal, Attilio d'Onofrio, Christian Defaye, Carlos Diegues, Antonio Gala, Andrey Petrov, Douglas Slocombe
1982	Giorgio Strehler; Italy	Jean-Jacques Annaud, Suso Cecchi d'Amico, Geraldine Chaplin, Gabriel García Márquez, Florian Hopf, Sidney Lumet, Mrinal Sen, Claude Soulé, René Thenevet
1983	William Styron; United States	Henri Alekan, Yvonne Baby, Sergei Bondarchuk, Youssef Chahine, Souleymane Cissé, Gilbert De Goldschmidt, Mariangela Melato, Karel Reisz, Lia van Leer
1984	Dirk Bogarde; United Kingdom	Franco Cristaldi, Michel Deville, Stanley Donen, Istvan Dosai, Arne Hestenes, Isabelle Huppert, Ennio Morricone, Jorge Semprún, Vadim Yusov
1985	Miloš Forman; Czechoslovakia / United States	Néstor Almendros, Jorge Amado, Mauro Bolognini, Claude Imbert, Sarah Miles, Michel Perez, Mo Rothman, Francis Veber, Edwin Zbonek
1986	Sydney Pollack; United States	Charles Aznavour, Sônia Braga, Lino Brocka, Tonino Delli Colli, Philip French, Alexandre Mnouchkine, István Szabó, Danièle Thompson, Alexandre Trauner
1987	Yves Montand; France	Theodoros Angelopoulos, Gérald Calderon, Danièle Heymann, Elem Klimov, Norman Mailer, Nicola Piovani, Jerzy Skolimowski, Jeremy Thomas
1988	Ettore Scola; Italy	Claude Berri, William Goldman, Nastassja Kinski, George Miller, Robby Müller, Héctor Olivera, David Robinson, Yelena Safonova, Philippe Sarde
1989	Wim Wenders; West Germany	Héctor Babenco, Claude Beylie, Renée Blanchar, Silvio Clementelli, Georges Delerue, Sally Field, Christine Gouze-Rénal, Peter Handke, Krzysztof Kieślowski
1990	Bernardo Bertolucci; Italy	Fanny Ardant, Bernard Blier, Françoise Giroud, Aleksei German, Christopher Hampton, Anjelica Huston, Mira Nair, Sven Nykvist, Hayao Shibata
1991	Roman Polanski; Poland	Férid Boughedir, Whoopi Goldberg, Margaret Ménégoz, Natalya Negoda, Alan Parker, Jean-Paul Rappeneau, Hans Dieter Seidel, Vittorio Storaro, Vangelis
1992	Gérard Depardieu; France	Pedro Almodóvar, John Boorman, René Cleitman, Jamie Lee Curtis, Carlo Di Palma, Nana Jorjadze, Lester James Peries, Serge Toubiana, Joële Van Effenterre
1993	Louis Malle; France	Claudia Cardinale, Judy Davis, Abbas Kiarostami, Emir Kusturica, William Lubtchansky, Tom Luddy, Gary Oldman, Augusto M. Seabra, Inna Churikova
1994	Clint Eastwood; United States	Catherine Deneuve, Pupi Avati, Guillermo Cabrera Infante, Kazuo Ishiguro, Alexander Kaidanovsky, Marie-Françoise Leclère, Shin Sang-ok, Lalo Schifrin, Alain Terzian
1995	Jeanne Moreau; France	Gianni Amelio, Jean-Claude Brialy, Emilio García Riera, Nadine Gordimer, Gaston Kaboré, Michèle Ray-Gavras, Philippe Rousselot, John Waters, Maria Zvereva
1996	Francis Ford Coppola; United States	Michael Ballhaus, Nathalie Baye, Henry Chapier, Atom Egoyan, Eiko Ishioka, Krzysztof Piesiewicz, Greta Scacchi, Antonio Tabucchi, Anh Hung Tran
1997	Isabelle Adjani; France	Paul Auster, Luc Bondy, Tim Burton, Patrick Dupond, Li Gong, Mike Leigh, Nanni Moretti, Michael Ondaatje, Mira Sorvino
1998	Martin Scorsese; United States	Kaige Chen, Alain Corneau, Chiara Mastroianni, Lena Olin, Winona Ryder, MC Solaar, Zoé Valdés, Sigourney Weaver, Michael Winterbottom
1999	David Cronenberg; Canada	Dominique Blanc, Doris Dörrie, Jeff Goldblum, Barbara Hendricks, Holly Hunter, George Miller, Maurizio Nichetti, Yasmina Reza, André Téchiné
2000	Luc Besson; France	Jonathan Demme, Nicole Garcia, Jeremy Irons, Mario Martone, Patrick Modiano, Arundhati Roy, Aitana Sánchez-Gijón, Kristin Scott Thomas, Barbara Sukowa
2001	Liv Ullmann; Norway	Mimmo Calopresti, Charlotte Gainsbourg, Terry Gilliam, Mathieu Kassovitz, Sandrine Kiberlain, Philippe Labro, Julia Ormond, Moufida Tlatli, Edward Yang
2002	David Lynch; United States	Bille August, Christine Hakim, Claude Miller, Raúl Ruiz, Walter Salles, Sharon Stone, Régis Wargnier, Michelle Yeoh
2003	Patrice Chéreau; France	Erri De Luca, Jiang Wen, Aishwarya Rai, Jean Rochefort, Meg Ryan, Steven Soderbergh, Danis Tanović, Karin Viard
2004	Quentin Tarantino; United States	Emmanuelle Béart, Edwidge Danticat, Tsui Hark, Benoît Poelvoorde, Jerry Schatzberg, Tilda Swinton, Kathleen Turner, Peter von Bagh
2005	Emir Kusturica; Serbia	Fatih Akın, Javier Bardem, Nandita Das, Salma Hayek, Benoît Jacquot, Toni Morrison, Agnès Varda, John Woo
2006	Wong Kar-wai; Hong Kong	Monica Bellucci, Helena Bonham Carter, Samuel L. Jackson, Patrice Leconte, Lucrecia Martel, Tim Roth, Elia Suleiman, Zhang Ziyi
2007	Stephen Frears; United Kingdom	Marco Bellocchio, Maggie Cheung, Toni Collette, Maria de Medeiros, Orhan Pamuk, Michel Piccoli, Sarah Polley, Abderrahmane Sissako
2008	Sean Penn; United States	Jeanne Balibar, Rachid Bouchareb, Sergio Castellitto, Alfonso Cuarón, Alexandra Maria Lara, Natalie Portman, Marjane Satrapi, Apichatpong Weerasethakul
2009	Isabelle Huppert; France	Asia Argento, Nuri Bilge Ceylan, James Gray, Hanif Kureishi, Lee Chang-dong, Shu Qi, Sharmila Tagore, Robin Wright
2010	Tim Burton; United States	Alberto Barbera, Kate Beckinsale, Emmanuel Carrère, Benicio del Toro, Alexandre Desplat, Víctor Erice, Shekhar Kapur, Giovanna Mezzogiorno
2011	Robert De Niro; United States	Olivier Assayas, Martina Gusmán, Mahamat Saleh Haroun, Jude Law, Nansun Shi, Uma Thurman, Johnnie To, Linn Ullmann
2012	Nanni Moretti; Italy	Hiam Abbass, Andrea Arnold, Emmanuelle Devos, Jean-Paul Gaultier, Diane Kruger, Ewan McGregor, Alexander Payne, Raoul Peck
2013	Steven Spielberg; United States	Daniel Auteuil, Vidya Balan, Naomi Kawase, Nicole Kidman, Ang Lee, Cristian Mungiu, Lynne Ramsay, Christoph Waltz
2014	Jane Campion; New Zealand	Gael García Bernal, Carole Bouquet, Sofia Coppola, Willem Dafoe, Jeon Do-yeon, Leila Hatami, Nicolas Winding Refn, Jia Zhangke
2015	Joel and Ethan Coen; United States	Xavier Dolan, Jake Gyllenhaal, Rossy de Palma, Sophie Marceau, Sienna Miller, Rokia Traoré, Guillermo del Toro
2016	George Miller; Australia	Arnaud Desplechin, Kirsten Dunst, Valeria Golino, Mads Mikkelsen, László Nemes, Vanessa Paradis, Katayoon Shahabi, Donald Sutherland
2017	Pedro Almodóvar; Spain	Maren Ade, Jessica Chastain, Fan Bingbing, Agnès Jaoui, Park Chan-wook, Will Smith, Paolo Sorrentino, Gabriel Yared
2018	Cate Blanchett; Australia	Chang Chen, Ava DuVernay, Robert Guédiguian, Khadja Nin, Léa Seydoux, Kristen Stewart, Denis Villeneuve, Andrey Zvyagintsev
2019	Alejandro González Iñárritu; Mexico	Enki Bilal, Robin Campillo, Maimouna N'Diaye, Elle Fanning, Yorgos Lanthimos, Paweł Pawlikowski, Kelly Reichardt, Alice Rohrwacher
2020	Spike Lee; United States	Festival cancelled due to the COVID-19 pandemic.
2021	Spike Lee; United States	Mati Diop, Mylène Farmer, Maggie Gyllenhaal, Jessica Hausner, Mélanie Laurent, Kleber Mendonça Filho, Tahar Rahim, Song Kang-ho
2022	Vincent Lindon; France	Asghar Farhadi, Rebecca Hall, Ladj Ly, Jeff Nichols, Deepika Padukone, Noomi Rapace, Joachim Trier, Jasmine Trinca
2023	Ruben Östlund; Sweden	Paul Dano, Julia Ducournau, Brie Larson, Denis Ménochet, Rungano Nyoni, Atiq Rahimi, Damián Szifron, Maryam Touzani
2024	Greta Gerwig; United States	J. A. Bayona, Ebru Ceylan, Pierfrancesco Favino, Lily Gladstone, Eva Green, Hirokazu Kore-eda, Nadine Labaki, Omar Sy
2025	Juliette Binoche; France	Halle Berry, Dieudo Hamadi, Hong Sang-soo, Payal Kapadia, Carlos Reygadas, Alba Rohrwacher, Leïla Slimani, Jeremy Strong
2026	Park Chan-wook; South Korea	Diego Céspedes, Isaach de Bankolé, Paul Laverty, Demi Moore, Ruth Negga, Stellan Skarsgård, Laura Wandel, Chloé Zhao

== Multiple appearances ==
- Marcel Achard - 1955, 1958, 1959, 1966
- Pedro Almodóvar - 1992, 2017
- Suzanne Borel - 1949, 1951, 1952
- Veljko Bulajić - 1968, 1969, 1980
- Tim Burton - 1998, 2010
- Louis Chauvet - 1951, 1952, 1953, 1960
- Jean Cocteau - 1953, 1954
- Tonino Delli Colli - 1961, 1986
- Guy Desson - 1951, 1952, 1953, 1954
- Kirk Douglas - 1970, 1980
- Jacques-Pierre Frogerais - 1949, 1952, 1953, 1954, 1955, 1956
- Tetsurō Furukaki - 1962, 1966
- Georges Huisman - 1946, 1947, 1949, 1957
- Isabelle Huppert - 1984, 2009
- Jacques Ibert - 1951, 1954
- Emir Kusturica - 1993, 2005
- André Lang - 1952, 1953, 1954
- Maurice Lehmann - 1956, 1957, 1966
- Louis Malle - 1968, 1993
- André Maurois - 1951, 1957, 1966
- George Miller - 1988, 1999, 2016
- Jeanne Moreau - 1975, 1995
- Nanni Moretti - 1997, 2012
- Marcel Pagnol - 1955, 1957, 1966
- Park Chan-wook - 2017, 2026
- Sydney Pollack - 1973, 1986
- Roman Polanski - 1968, 1991
- Georges Raguis - 1947, 1949, 1951, 1952, 1953, 1954
- Yuli Raizman - 1962, 1966
- René Jeanne - 1947, 1949, 1951
- Carlo Rim - 1949, 1951
- Robert Rozhdestvensky - 1968, 1973, 1979
- Armand Salacrou - 1963, 1966
- Sergei Vasilyev - 1956, 1959
- Sergei Yutkevich - 1955, 1958

== See also ==
- Cannes Film Festival § Juries
- List of Cannes Film Festival jury presidents
