= List of Cannes Film Festival jury presidents =

Each year, the jury of the Cannes Film Festival is chaired by an internationally recognized personality of cinema. Being appointed to this position is the recognition of an outstanding career.

Originally occupied by a French personality, the position was opened to foreign figures starting in the 1960s. Typically, the role is assigned to a film director or an actor. However, several individuals outside the film industry have held the position, including italian theatre director Giorgio Strehler and novelists Françoise Sagan, Miguel Ángel Asturias, Georges Simenon, and William Styron (the last non-professional film personality to serve as jury president). The first woman to hold the position was British and American actress Olivia de Havilland in 1965. Since 1960, only one person has received this honor twice: french actress Jeanne Moreau in 1975 and 1995. In 2015, the jury presidency was awarded for the first time to two individuals: American filmmakers Joel Coen and Ethan Coen.

Since 1987, the Official Selection includes a separate jury and its president in the frame of the Caméra d'Or which chooses its best feature film presented in one of the Cannes' selections (Official Selection, Directors' Fortnight, or International Critics' Week). Since 1998, another separate jury and its president have been added for the films of the Un Certain Regard section.

== Jury Presidents ==
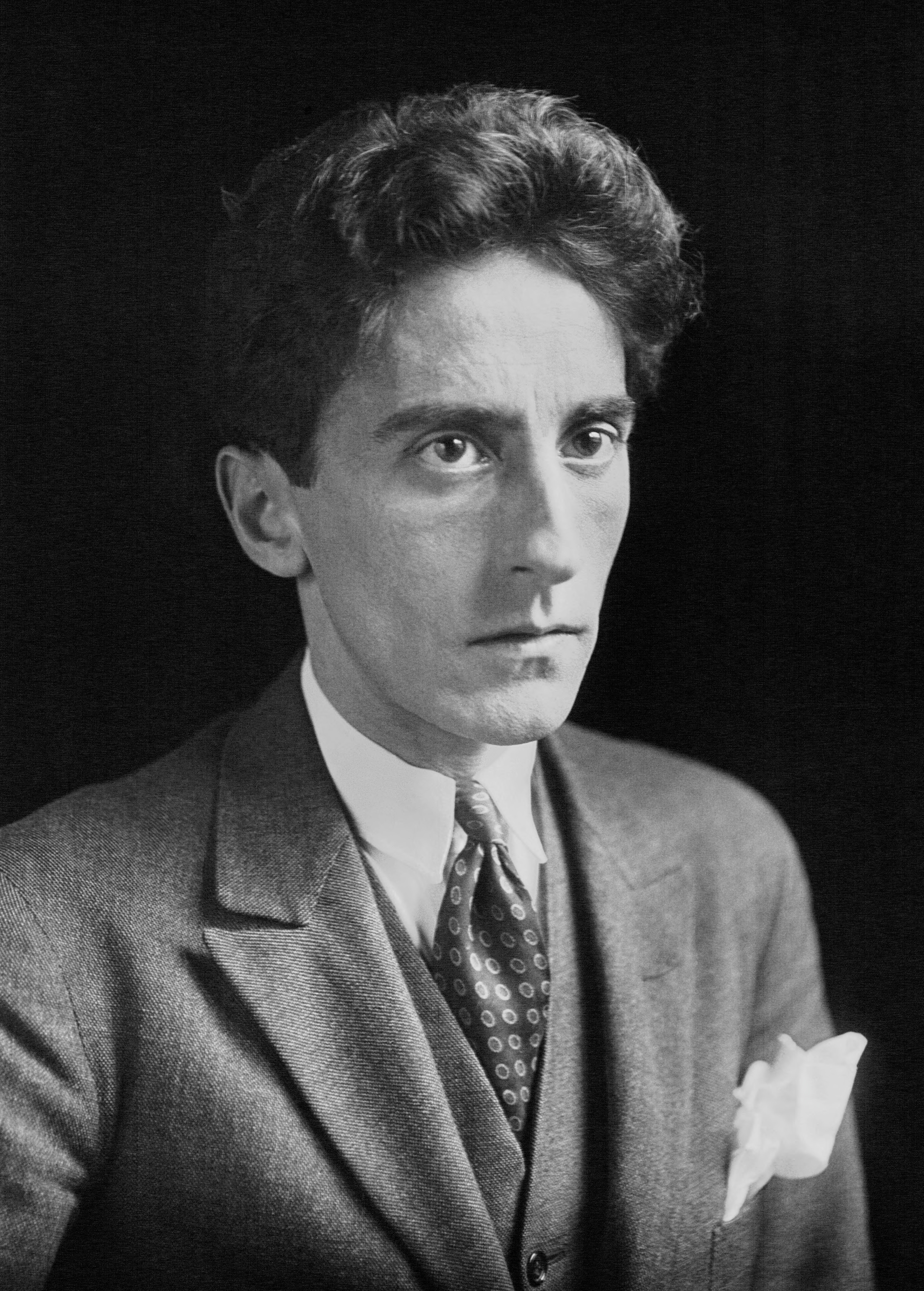
Jean Cocteau, President of the Jury in 1953 and 1954

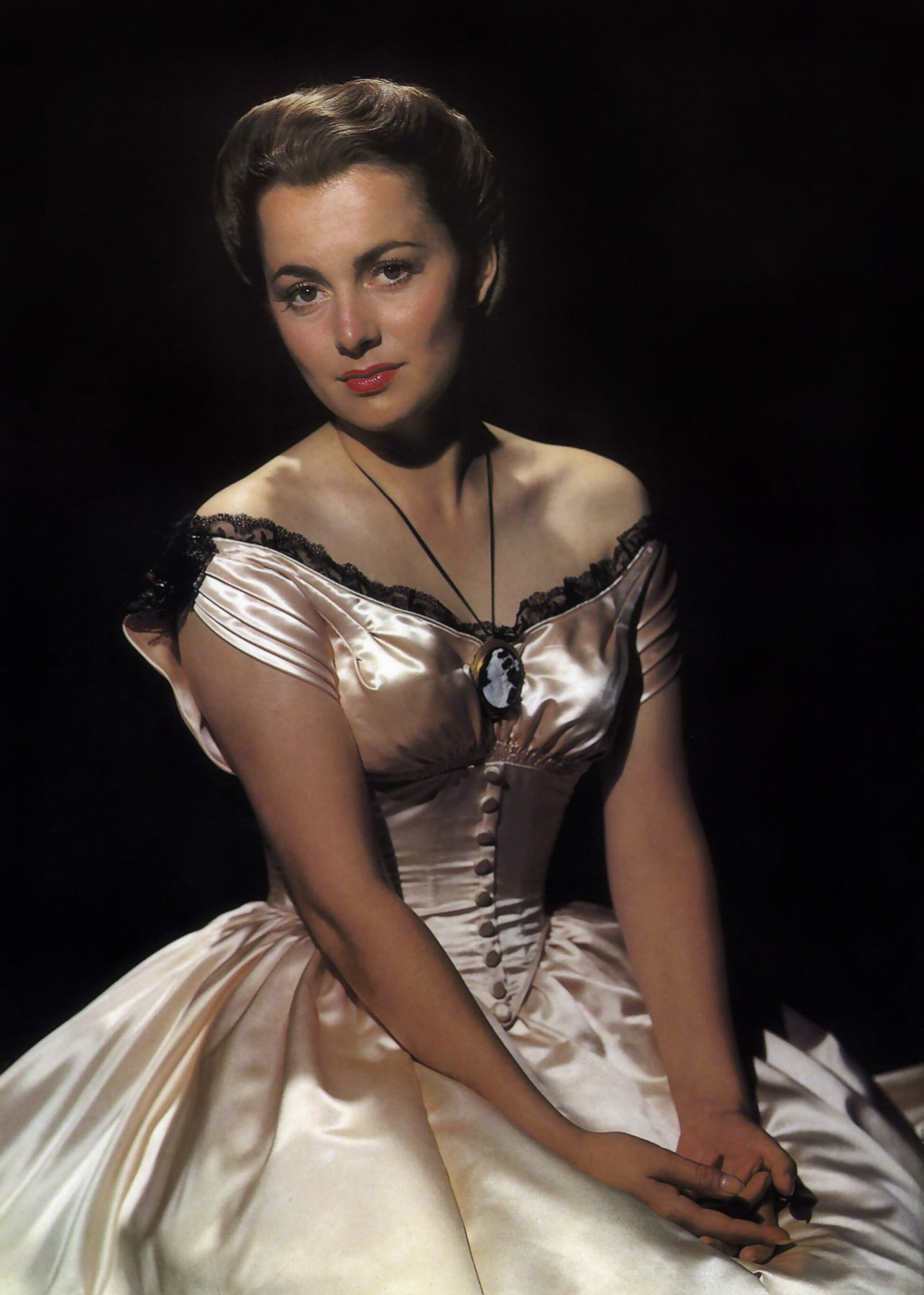
Olivia de Havilland, President of the Jury in 1965

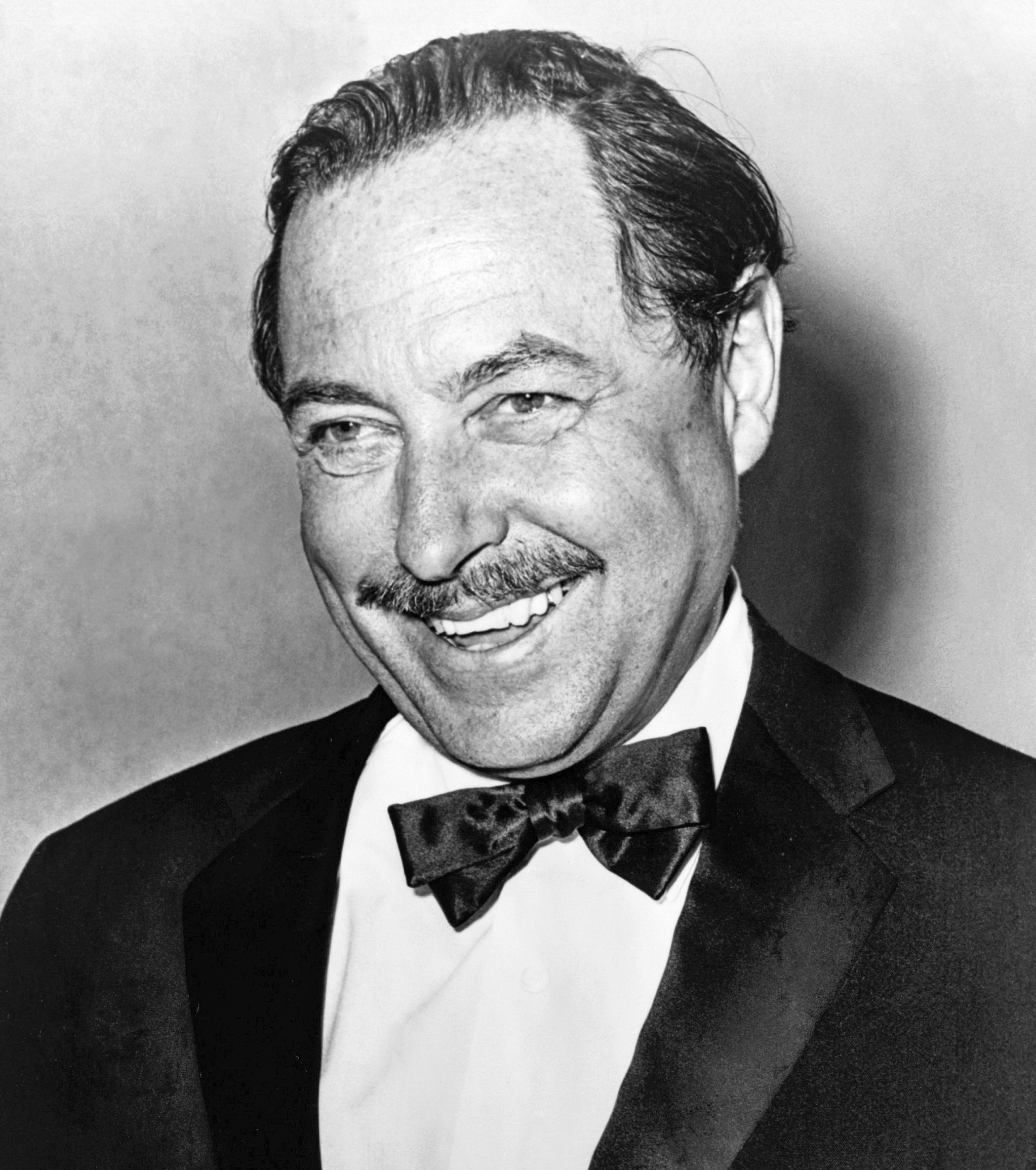
Tennessee Williams, President of the Jury in 1976

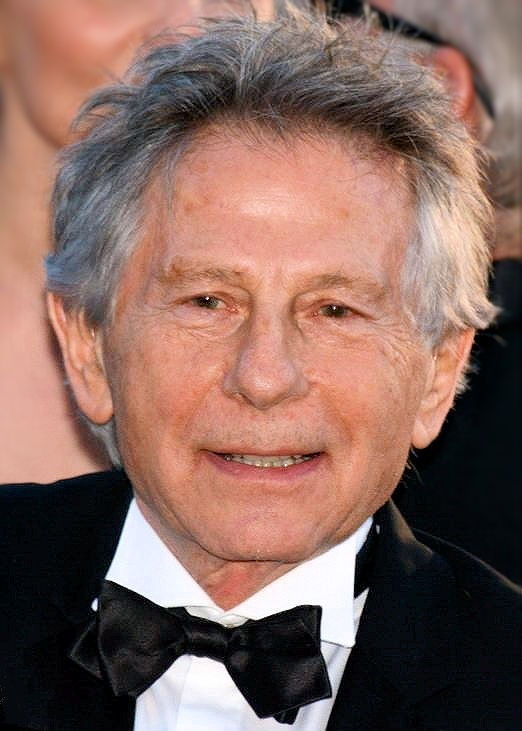
Roman Polanski, President of the Jury in 1991

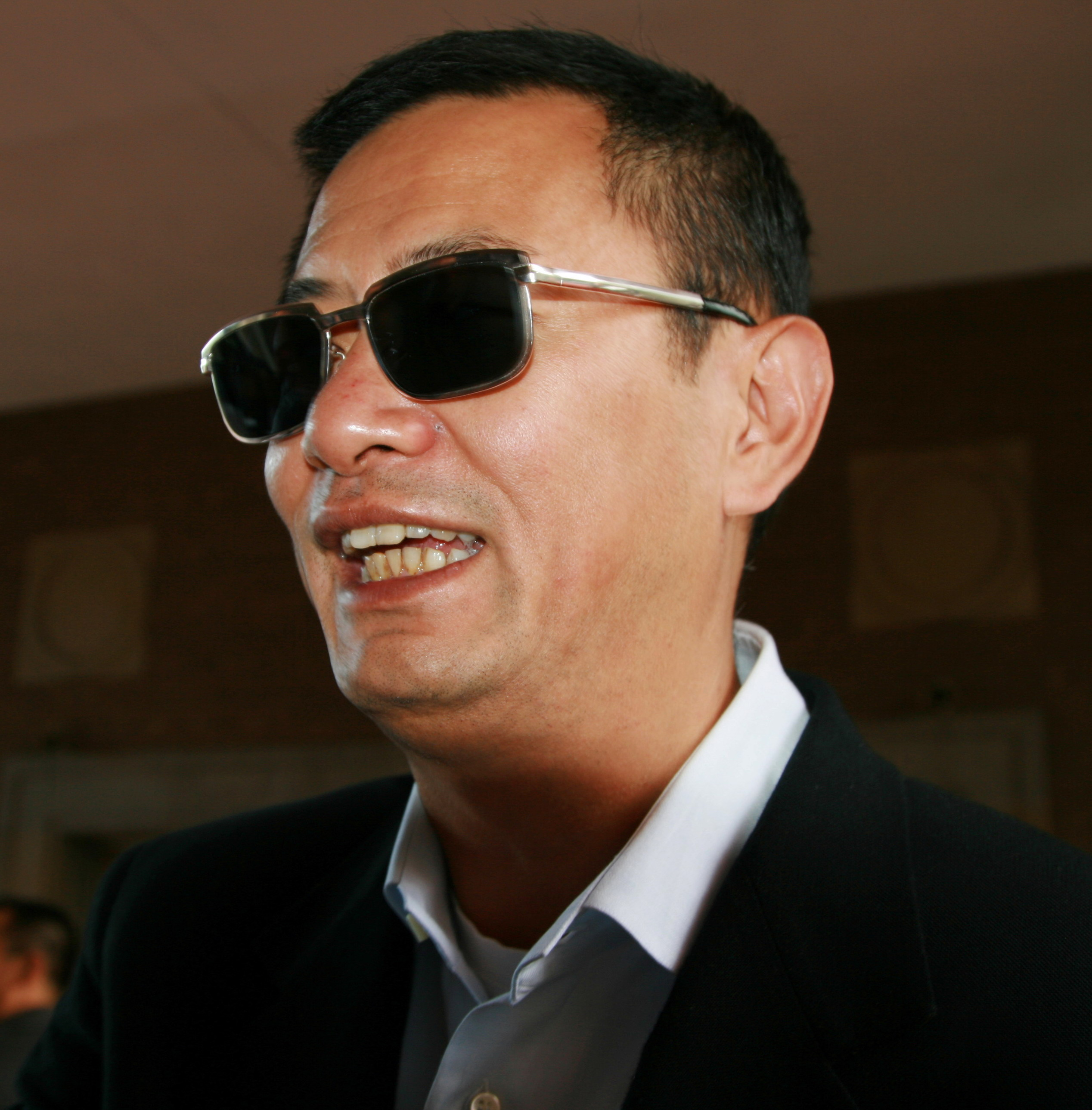
Wong Kar-wai, President of the Jury in 2006

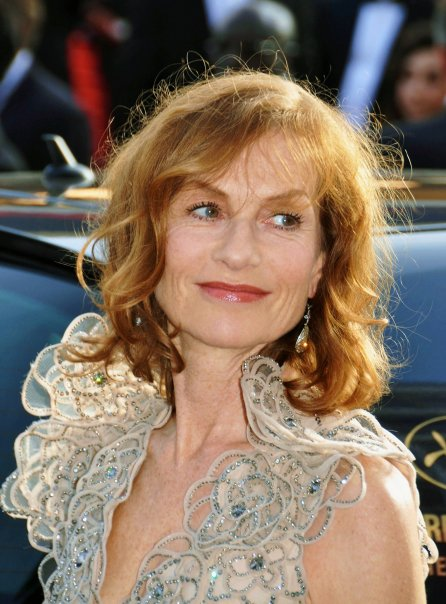
Isabelle Huppert, President of the Jury in 2009

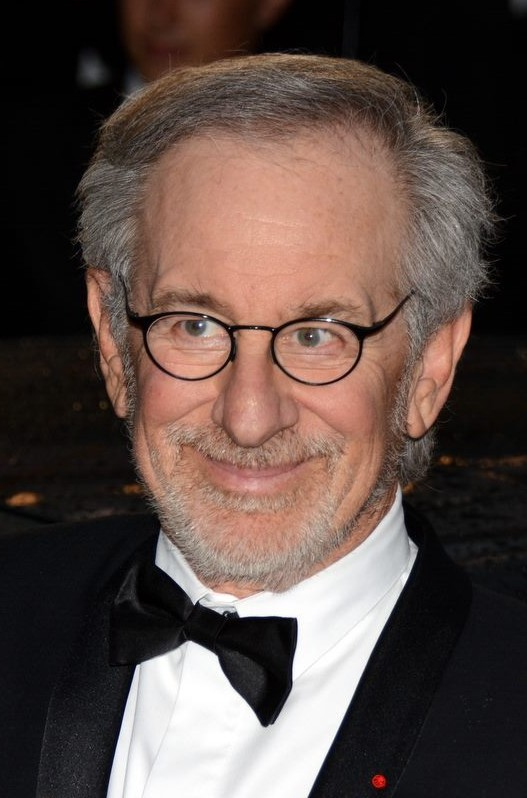
Steven Spielberg, President of the Jury in 2013

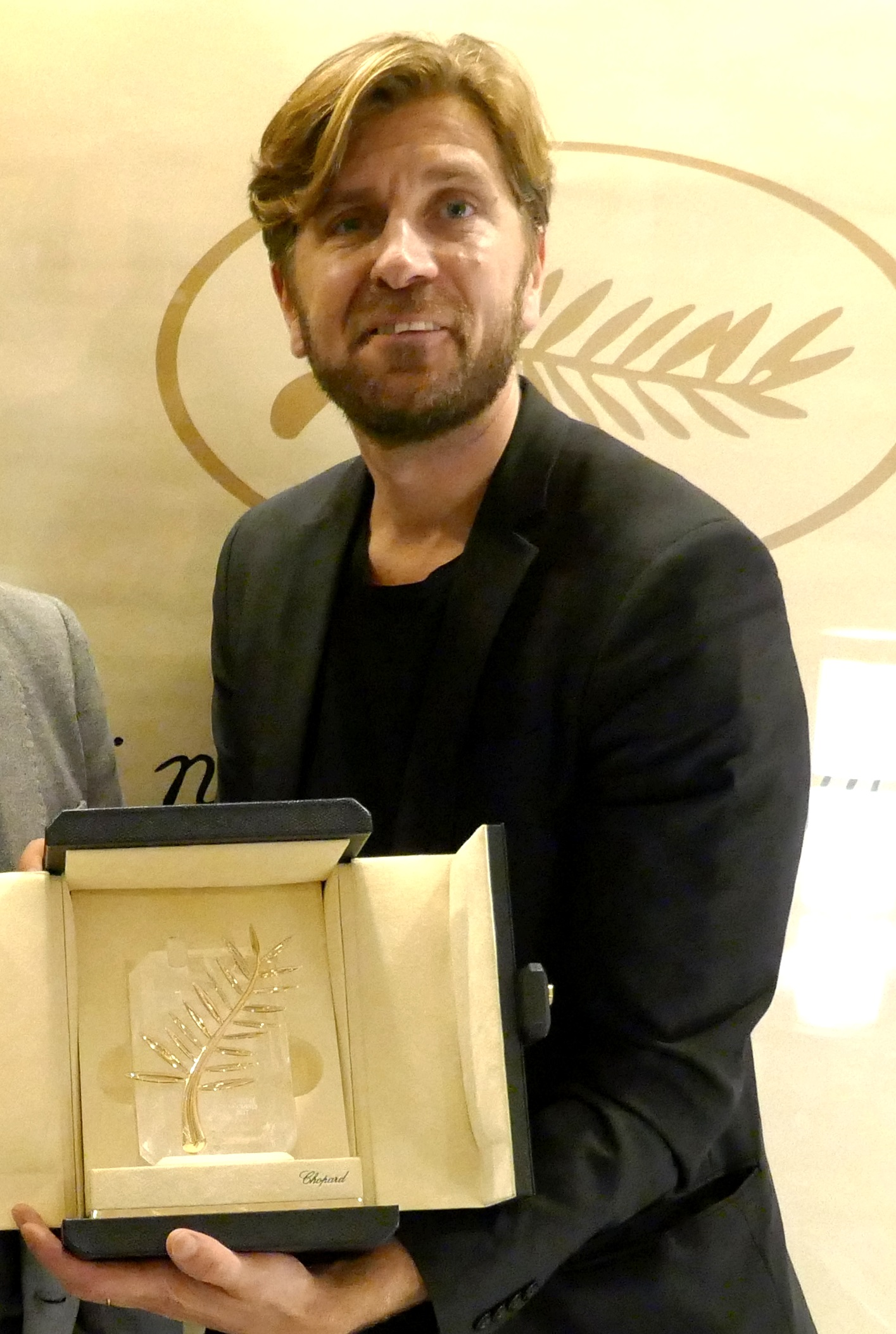
Ruben Östlund, President of the Jury in 2023

=== Main Competition ===
Year	President	Profession
1946	(France) Georges Huisman	Historian and politician
1947	(France) Georges Huisman	Historian and politician
1949	(France) Georges Huisman	Historian and politician
1951	(France) André Maurois	Author
1952	(France) Maurice Genevoix	Author
1953	(France) Jean Cocteau	Filmmaker and author
1954	(France) Jean Cocteau	Filmmaker and author
1955	(France) Marcel Pagnol	Filmmaker and author
1956	(France) Maurice Lehmann	Actor
1957	(France) André Maurois	Author
1958	(France) Marcel Achard	Author
1959	(France) Marcel Achard	Author
1960	(Belgium) Georges Simenon	Author
1961	(France) Jean Giono	Author
1962	(Japan) Tetsurō Furukaki	Journalist and diplomat
1963	(France) Armand Salacrou	Author
1964	(Austria) (West Germany) Fritz Lang	Filmmaker
1965	(United Kingdom) (United States) Olivia de Havilland	Actress
1966	(Italy) Sophia Loren	Actress
1967	(Italy) Alessandro Blasetti	Filmmaker
1968	(France) André Chamson	Author
1969	(Italy) Luchino Visconti	Filmmaker
1970	(Guatemala) Miguel Ángel Asturias	Author and diplomat
1971	(France) Michèle Morgan	Actress
1972	(United States) Joseph Losey	Filmmaker
1973	(Sweden) Ingrid Bergman	Actress
1974	(France) René Clair	Filmmaker
1975	(France) Jeanne Moreau	Actress
1976	(United States) Tennessee Williams	Author
1977	(Italy) Roberto Rossellini	Filmmaker
1978	(United States) Alan J. Pakula	Filmmaker
1979	(France) Françoise Sagan	Author
1980	(United States) Kirk Douglas	Actor
1981	(France) Jacques Deray	Filmmaker
1982	(Italy) Giorgio Strehler	Opera and theater director
1983	(United States) William Styron	Author
1984	(United Kingdom) Dirk Bogarde	Actor
1985	(United States) Miloš Forman	Filmmaker
1986	(United States) Sydney Pollack	Filmmaker
1987	(France) Yves Montand	Actor
1988	(Italy) Ettore Scola	Filmmaker
1989	(West Germany) Wim Wenders	Filmmaker
1990	(Italy) Bernardo Bertolucci	Filmmaker
1991	(Poland) (France) Roman Polanski	Filmmaker
1992	(France) Gérard Depardieu	Actor
1993	(France) Louis Malle	Filmmaker
1994	(United States) Clint Eastwood	Filmmaker and actor
1995	(France) Jeanne Moreau	Actress
1996	(United States) Francis Ford Coppola	Filmmaker
1997	(France) Isabelle Adjani	Actress
1998	(United States) Martin Scorsese	Filmmaker
1999	(Canada) David Cronenberg	Filmmaker
2000	(France) Luc Besson	Filmmaker
2001	(Norway) Liv Ullmann	Actress
2002	(United States) David Lynch	Filmmaker
2003	(France) Patrice Chéreau	Opera and theater director
2004	(United States) Quentin Tarantino	Filmmaker
2005	(Serbia) Emir Kusturica	Filmmaker
2006	(Hong Kong) Wong Kar-wai	Filmmaker
2007	(United Kingdom) Stephen Frears	Filmmaker
2008	(United States) Sean Penn	Actor
2009	(France) Isabelle Huppert	Actress
2010	(United States) Tim Burton	Filmmaker
2011	(United States) Robert De Niro	Actor
2012	(Italy) Nanni Moretti	Filmmaker and actor
2013	(United States) Steven Spielberg	Filmmaker
2014	(New Zealand) Jane Campion	Filmmaker
2015	(United States) Joel Coen and Ethan Coen	Filmmakers
2016	(Australia) George Miller	Filmmaker
2017	(Spain) Pedro Almodóvar	Filmmaker
2018	(Australia) Cate Blanchett	Actress
2019	(Mexico) Alejandro González Iñárritu	Filmmaker
2020 (Note: The 2020 Cannes Film Festival was ultimately cancelled due to the COVID-19 pandemic in France)	(United States) Spike Lee	Filmmaker and actor
2021	(United States) Spike Lee	Filmmaker and actor
2022	(France) Vincent Lindon	Actor
2023	(Sweden) Ruben Östlund	Filmmaker
2024	(United States) Greta Gerwig	Filmmaker and actress
2025	(France) Juliette Binoche	Actress
2026	(South Korea) Park Chan-wook	Filmmaker

=== Caméra d'Or ===
Year	President	Profession
1987	(France) Maurice Le Roux	Composer and conductor
1988	(France) Danièle Delorme	Actress and producer
1989	(Italy) Raf Vallone	Actor and footballer
1990	(France) Christine Boisson	Actress
1991	(United Kingdom) (United States) Geraldine Chaplin	Actress
1992	(Belgium) André Delvaux	Filmmaker
1993	(France) Micheline Presle	Actress
1994	(Switzerland) Marthe Keller	Actress
1995	(France) Michel Deville	Filmmaker
1996	(France) Françoise Fabian	Actress
1997	(France) Françoise Arnoul	Actress
1998	(France) Tran Anh Hung	Filmmaker
1999	(France) Michel Piccoli	Actor
2000	(Georgia (country)) Otar Iosseliani	Filmmaker
2001	(Portugal) Maria de Medeiros	Actress
2002	(United Kingdom) (United States) Geraldine Chaplin	Actress
2003	(Germany) Wim Wenders	Filmmaker
2004	(United Kingdom) Tim Roth	Actor
2005	(Iran) Abbas Kiarostami	Filmmaker
2006	(Belgium) Dardenne brothers	Filmmakers
2007	(Russia) Pavel Lungin	Filmmaker
2008	(Belgium) (France) Bruno Dumont	Filmmaker
2009	(France) Roschdy Zem	Actor and filmmaker
2010	(Mexico) Gael García Bernal	Actor
2011	(South Korea) Bong Joon-ho	Filmmaker
2012	(Brazil) Carlos Diegues	Filmmaker
2013	(France) Agnès Varda	Filmmaker
2014	(France) Nicole Garcia	Actress and filmmaker
2015	(France) Sabine Azéma	Actress and filmmaker
2016	(France) Catherine Corsini	Actress and filmmaker
2017	(France) Sandrine Kiberlain	Actress
2018	(Switzerland) Ursula Meier	Filmmaker
2019	(Cambodia) Rithy Panh	Filmmaker
2021	(France) Mélanie Thierry	Actress
2022	(Spain) Rossy de Palma	Actress
2023	(France) Anaïs Demoustier	Actress
2024	(Belgium) Baloji (co-president)	Filmmaker
2024	(France) Emmanuelle Béart (co-president)	Actress
2025	(Italy) Alice Rohrwacher	Filmmaker
2026	(Canada) Monia Chokri	Actress and filmmaker

=== Un Certain Regard ===
Year	President	Profession
1999	(France) Lambert Wilson	Actor
2000	(United Kingdom) Jane Birkin	Actress
2001	(France) Ariane Ascaride	Actress
2002	(France) Anne Fontaine	Filmmaker
2003	(Mali) Abderrahmane Sissako	Filmmaker
2004	(United Kingdom) Jeremy Thomas	Producer
2005	(United States) Alexander Payne	Filmmaker
2006	(United States) Monte Hellman	Filmmaker
2007	(France) Pascale Ferran	Filmmaker
2008	(Germany) Fatih Akin	Filmmaker
2009	(Italy) Paolo Sorrentino	Filmmaker
2010	(France) Claire Denis	Filmmaker
2011	(Serbia) Emir Kusturica	Filmmaker
2012	(United Kingdom) Tim Roth	Actor
2013	(Denmark) Thomas Vinterberg	Filmmaker
2014	(Argentina) Pablo Trapero	Filmmaker
2015	(Italy) Isabella Rossellini	Actress
2016	(Switzerland) Marthe Keller	Actress
2017	(United States) Uma Thurman	Actress
2018	(Puerto Rico) Benicio del Toro	Actor
2019	(Lebanon) Nadine Labaki	Actress and filmmaker
2021	(United Kingdom) Andrea Arnold	Filmmaker
2022	(Italy) Valeria Golino	Actress and filmmaker
2023	(United States) John C. Reilly	Actor
2024	(Canada) Xavier Dolan	Actor and filmmaker
2025	(United Kingdom) Molly Manning Walker	Filmmaker
2026	(France) Leïla Bekhti	Actress

== See also ==
- List of Berlin International Film Festival jury presidents
- List of Venice Film Festival jury presidents
