= 1949 Cannes Film Festival =

3rd Cannes Film Festival
- Official poster of the 3rd Cannes Film Festival illustrated by G.C. Chavane.
- Opening film: L'Arroseur Arrosé
- Location: Cannes, France
- Founded: 1946
- Awards: Grand Prix (The Third Man)
- No. of films: 29 (In Competition); 1 (Out of Competition); 32 (Short Film)
- Festival date: 2 September 1949 – 17 September 1949
- Website: www.festival-cannes.com

Cannes Film Festival
- 1951 1947

The 3rd Cannes Film Festival was held from 2 to 17 September 1949. The previous year, no festival had been held because of financial problems (same reason it did not occur in 1950 either).

Like in 1947, the entire jury for this festival was made up of French persons, with historian Georges Huisman as president of the jury. The Grand Prix du Festival de Cannes went to The Third Man by Carol Reed. The festival opened with L'Arroseur Arrosé by Louis Lumière, an 1895 French comedy short-film, paying tribute to cinema's first comedy film.

== Jury ==
The following persons were selected as the jury for the feature and short films:

- Georges Huisman (historian) - Jury President
- Jules Romains (president)
- Suzanne Borel (diplomat)
- Georges Charensol
- Paul Colin
- Roger Désormière
- Jacques-Pierre Frogerais
- Étienne Gilson (author)
- Paul Gosset (author)
- Georges Raguis (union official)
- Rene-Jeanne (critic)
- Carlo Rim

Substitute members

- Jean Benoît-Lévy
- Guy Desson (MP official)
- Alexandre Kamenka
- Paul Verneyras (MP official)
- Paul Weill (lawyer)

== Feature film competition ==
The following feature films competed for the Grand Prix:

- Act of Violence directed by Fred Zinnemann
- The Adventures of Antar and Abla (Mughamarat Antar wa Abla) directed by Salah Abu Sayf
- Almafuerte directed by Luis Cesar Amadori
- An Act of Murder directed by Michael Gordon
- At the Grand Balcony directed by Henri Decoin
- Bitter Rice (Riso amaro) directed by Giuseppe De Santis
- Eroica directed by H. Walter Kolm-Veltee
- Foreign Harbour (Främmande hamn) directed by Hampe Faustman
- Girls in Gingham (Die Buntkarierten) directed by Kurt Maetzig
- Eine große Liebe directed by Hans Bertram
- House of Strangers directed by Joseph L. Mankiewicz
- Images d'Ethiopie directed by Paul Pichonnier
- Keep an Eye on Amelia (Occupe-toi d'Amélie) directed by Claude Autant-Lara
- The Last Illusion (Der Ruf) directed by Josef Von Báky
- Lies of Love (L'amorosa menzogna) directed by Michelangelo Antonioni
- Lost Boundaries directed by Alfred L. Werker
- Na svoji zemlji directed by France Stiglic
- Obsession directed by Edward Dmytryk
- The Original Sin (Der Apfel ist ab) directed by Helmut Käutner
- The Passionate Friends directed by David Lean
- Pueblerina directed by Emilio Fernández
- The Queen of Spades directed by Thorold Dickinson
- Rendezvous in July (Rendez-vous de juillet) directed by Jacques Becker
- Return to Life (Retour à la vie) directed by Jean Dréville, Henri-Georges Clouzot, Georges Lampin, André Cayatte
- Sertao directed by Joao G. Martin
- The Set Up directed by Robert Wise
- The Third Man directed by Carol Reed
- The Walls of Malapaga (Le Mura di Malapaga) directed by René Clément
- Without Honor directed by Irving Pichel

== Out of competition ==
The following film was selected to be screened out of competition:

- Passport to Pimlico directed by O. H. Cornelius

== Short films ==
The following short films competed for the Grand Prix du court métrage:

- Adamah by Helmar Lerski
- Au pays de Thil Uilenspiegel by Charles Dekeukeleire
- Barrières by Christian-Jaque
- Biały redyk by Stanisław Możdżeński
- The Cane Cutters by John Heyer
- A Capital Plan by Bernard Devlin
- Danses populaires yougoslaves by Rudolf Sremec
- Over-Dependency (Dépendance) by Robert Anderson
- The People Between (Destins précaires) by Grant McLean
- Ecole de Rééducation by Jean Drimaropoulos
- L'enfer des fards by Jean Perdrix
- The Fatal Signboard by John Kooy
- Les feux de la mer by Jean Epstein
- Flotteurs de bois by Brita Wrede
- Gold Town by Maslyn Williams
- Images Médiévales by William Novik
- Une interview sous les tropiques by E. van Konijnenburg
- It's a Lovely Day by Bert Felstead
- Mlle Toutouche by Wilhelm Sorensen
- Muscle Beach by Joseph Strick and Irving Lerner
- De nåede færgen by Carl Theodor Dreyer
- North Shore (La terre de Cain) by Pierre Petel
- Ocean Weather Ship by Frank Chilton
- Pacific 231 by Jean Mitry
- Le Pain de Barbarie by Roger Leenhardt
- Palle alene i Verden by Astrid Henning-Jensen
- Rhapsodie vénitienne by Max Haufler
- Seal Island by James Algar
- Struggle for oil by Sergei Nolbandov
- The Valley is Ours by John Heyer
- Walcheren, ile noyee by Charles Huguenot van der Linden
- Żelazowa Wola by Eugeniusz Cękalski

== Awards ==
=== Official awards ===
The following films and people received the 1949 awards:

Feature Films

- Grand Prix: The Third Man by Carol Reed
- Best Director: René Clément for The Walls of Malapaga
- Best Screenplay: Eugene Ling and Virginia Shaler for Lost Boundaries
- Best Actress: Isa Miranda for The Walls of Malapaga
- Best Actor: Edward G. Robinson for House of Strangers
- Best Cinematography: Milton R. Krasner for The Set-Up

Short Film awards

- Prize for Best Subject: Palle Alene i Verden by Astrid Henning-Jensen
- Prize for Best Editing: Pacific 231 by Jean Mitry
- Prize for Best Filmed Coverage: Seal Island by James Algar
- Prize for Best Cinematography: Biały redyk by Stanisław Możdżeński
- Prize for Best Colour: Images Médiévales by William Novik

=== Independent awards ===
FIPRESCI Prize

- The Set-Up by Robert Wise

== Media ==
- British Pathé: Cannes Film Festival 1949 footage
- Institut National de l'Audiovisuel: Opening of the 1949 Festival (commentary in French)
- INA: 1949 - Fireworks at the Eden Roc (commentary in French)
