= List of Venice Film Festival jury presidents =

Each year, the jury of the Venice Film Festival is chaired by an internationally recognized personality of cinema.

From 1935 to 1939, senator and entrepreneur Giuseppe Volpi, founder of the Festival, held the office of president of the jury. Volpi, together with journalist Mario Gromo holds the record of acting as Jury President for 5 times.

The first foreign president of the jury was Scottish documentarian John Grierson. The first woman who held the office of president of the jury was screenwriter Suso Cecchi d'Amico.

In 1992, two people held the office of president of the jury together: actor Dennis Hopper and director Jiří Menzel.

From 1940 to 1942 the Festivals are considered as not disputed, while from 1943 to 1945 the Festival wasn't organized due to World War II. From 1969 to 1972 and in 1979 the Festival was not competitive, while from 1973 to 1978 the Festival was not organized.

== Main competition jury presidents ==
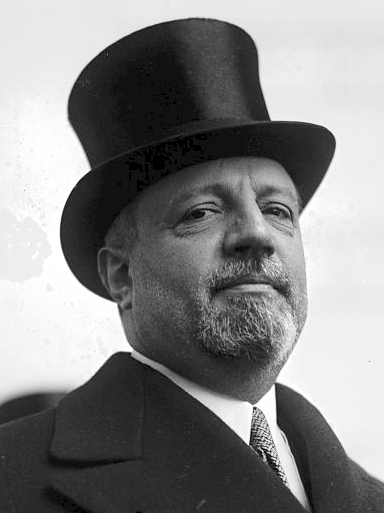
Giuseppe Volpi, President of the Jury from 1935 to 1939

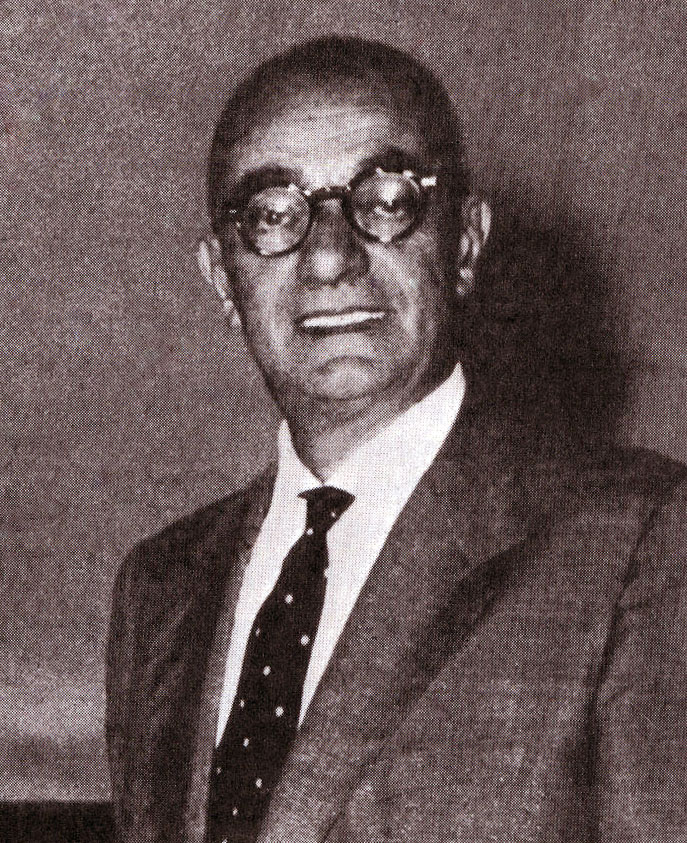
Luigi Chiarini, President of the Jury in 1948, 1959 and 1962

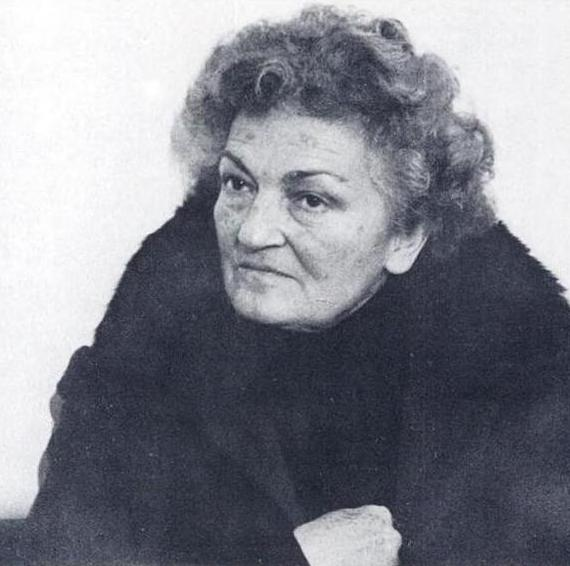
Suso Cecchi d'Amico, the first woman President of the Jury in 1980

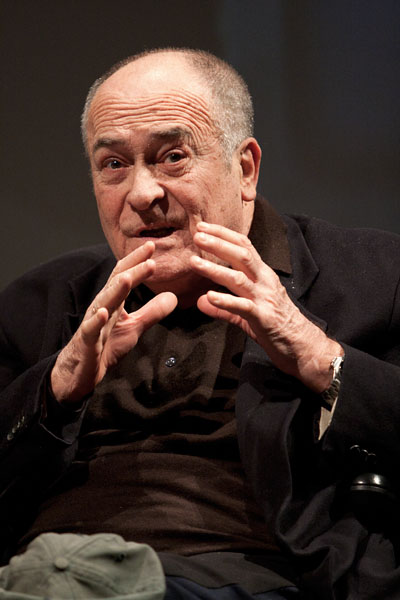
Bernardo Bertolucci, President of the Jury in 1983 and 2013

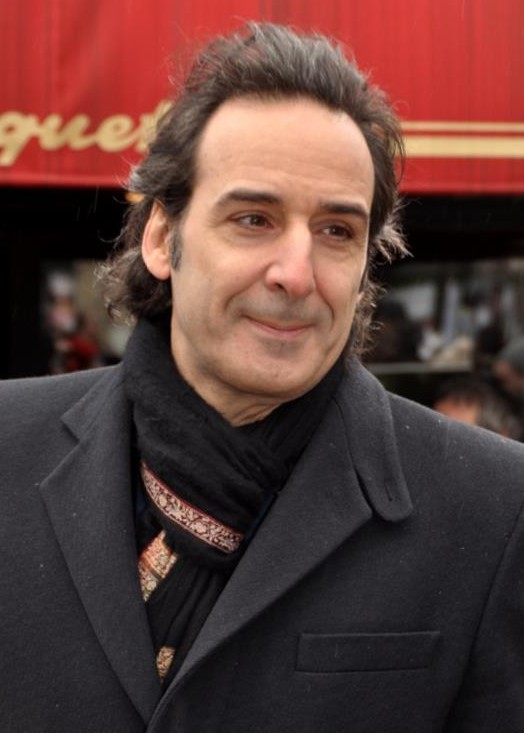
Alexandre Desplat, the first composer President of the Jury in 2014

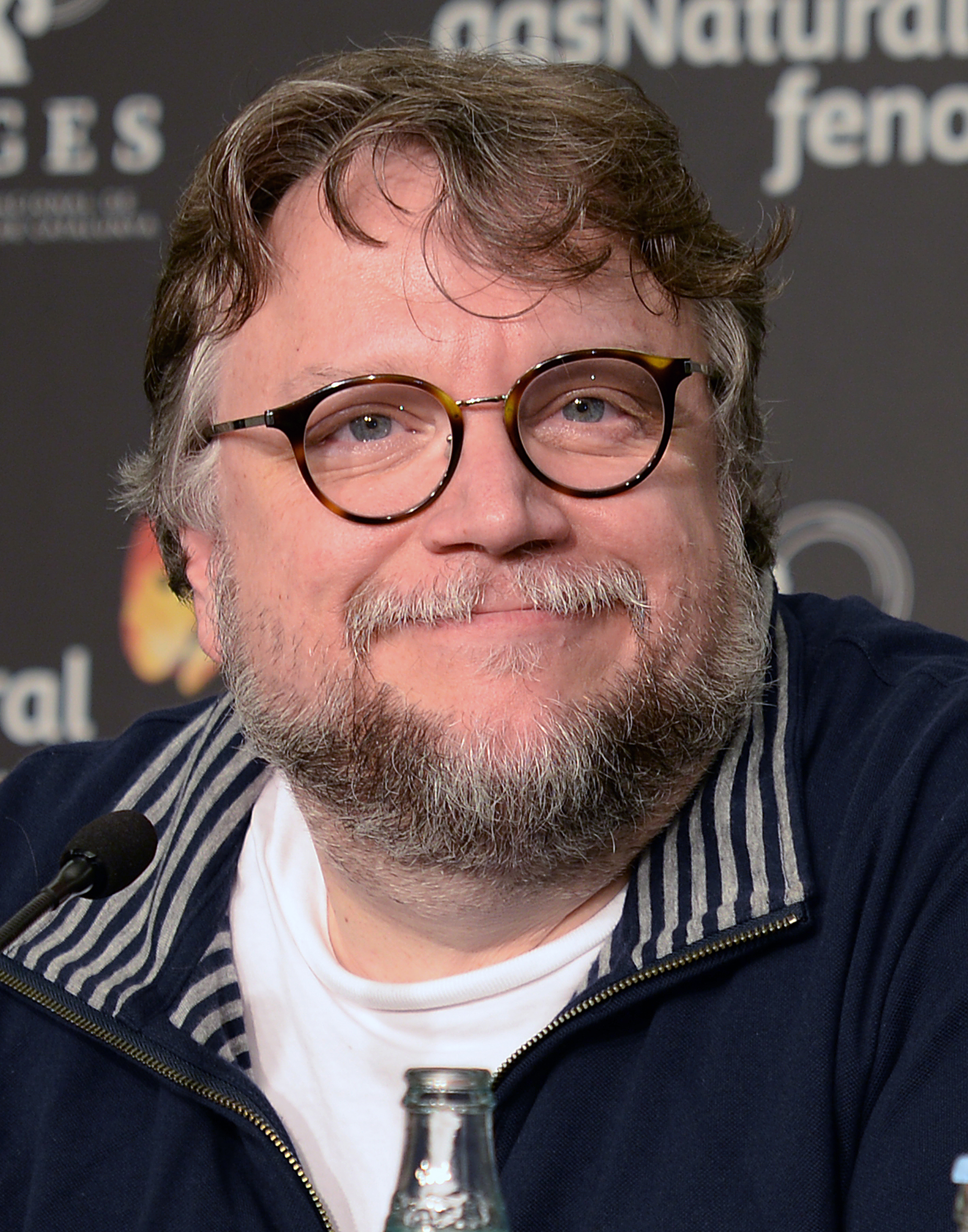
Guillermo del Toro, President of the Jury in 2018

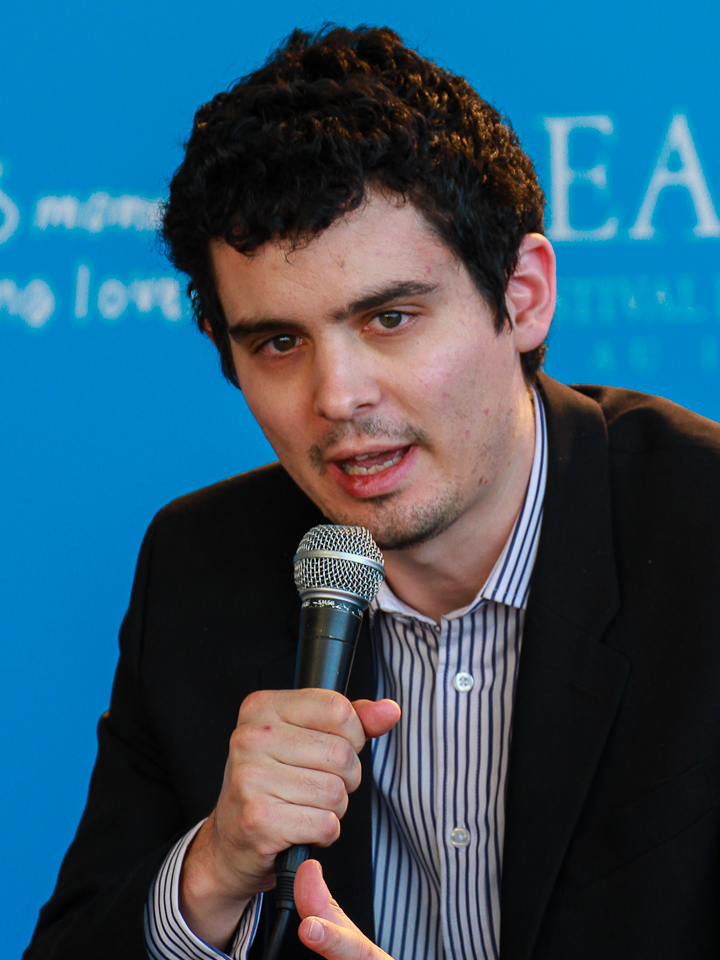
Damien Chazelle, President of Jury in 2023

Year	President	Profession
1935	Giuseppe Volpi	Producer
1936	Giuseppe Volpi	Producer
1937	Giuseppe Volpi	Producer
1938	Giuseppe Volpi	Producer
1939	Giuseppe Volpi	Producer
1947	Vinicio Marinucci	Journalist, Filmmaker
1948	Luigi Chiarini	Journalist, Filmmaker
1949	Mario Gromo	Journalist
1950	Mario Gromo	Journalist
1951	Mario Gromo	Journalist
1952	Mario Gromo	Journalist
1953	Eugenio Montale	Poet
1954	Ignazio Silone	Poet
1955	Mario Gromo	Journalist
1956	John Grierson	Documentarian
1957	René Clair	Filmmaker
1958	Jean Grémillon	Filmmaker
1959	Luigi Chiarini	Journalist, Filmmaker
1960	Marcel Achard	Screenwriter
1961	Filippo Sacchi	Journalist
1962	Luigi Chiarini	Journalist, Filmmaker
1963	Arturo Lanocita	Journalist
1964	Mario Soldati	Filmmaker
1965	Carlo Bo	Poet
1966	Giorgio Bassani	Poet
1967	Alberto Moravia	Poet
1968	Guido Piovene	Journalist
1980	Suso Cecchi d'Amico	Screenwriter
1981	Italo Calvino	Poet
1982	Marcel Carné	Filmmaker
1983	Bernardo Bertolucci	Filmmaker
1984	Michelangelo Antonioni	Filmmaker
1985	Krzysztof Zanussi	Filmmaker
1986	Alain Robbe-Grillet	Filmmaker
1987	Irene Papas	Actress
1988	Sergio Leone	Filmmaker
1989	Andrei Smirnov	Actor
1990	Gore Vidal	Poet, Screenwriter
1991	Gian Luigi Rondi	Journalist
1992	Dennis Hopper	Actor, Director
1992	Jiří Menzel	Filmmaker
1993	Peter Weir	Filmmaker
1994	David Lynch	Filmmaker
1995	Jorge Semprún	Poet
1996	Roman Polanski	Filmmaker
1997	Jane Campion	Filmmaker
1998	Ettore Scola	Filmmaker
1999	Emir Kusturica	Filmmaker
2000	Miloš Forman	Filmmaker
2001	Nanni Moretti	Actor and Filmmaker
2002	Gong Li	Actress
2003	Mario Monicelli	Filmmaker
2004	John Boorman	Filmmaker
2005	Dante Ferretti	Production Designer
2006	Catherine Deneuve	Actress
2007	Zhang Yimou	Filmmaker
2008	Wim Wenders	Filmmaker
2009	Ang Lee	Filmmaker
2010	Quentin Tarantino	Filmmaker
2011	Darren Aronofsky	Filmmaker
2012	Michael Mann	Filmmaker
2013	Bernardo Bertolucci	Filmmaker
2014	Alexandre Desplat	Composer
2015	Alfonso Cuarón	Filmmaker
2016	Sam Mendes	Filmmaker
2017	Annette Bening	Actress
2018	Guillermo del Toro	Filmmaker
2019	Lucrecia Martel	Filmmaker
2020	Cate Blanchett	Actress
2021	Bong Joon-ho	Filmmaker
2022	Julianne Moore	Actress
2023	Damien Chazelle	Filmmaker
2024	Isabelle Huppert	Actress
2025	Alexander Payne	Filmmaker
2026	Maggie Gyllenhaal	Actress and Filmmaker

== Multiple time presidents ==
The following individuals served as president of the jury two or more times:

Times	President
5	Mario Gromo
5	Giuseppe Volpi
3	Luigi Chiarini
2	Bernardo Bertolucci

== See also ==
- List of Berlin International Film Festival jury presidents
- List of Cannes Film Festival jury presidents
