= Yurenev =

Yurenev (Russian: Юренев) is a Russian masculine surname, its feminine counterpart is Yureneva. It may refer to:

- Rostislav Yurenev (1912–2002), Russian film critic and teacher
- Konstantin Yurenev (1888–1938), Soviet politician and diplomat
