= Marouf, the Cairo Cobbler =

1947 film

- Directed by: Jean Mauran
- Release date: 1947
- Country: Morocco
- Language: French

Marouf, the Cairo Cobbler (French: Marouf Savetier du Caire) is a 1947 Moroccan film directed by Jean Mauran. It was entered into the 1947 Cannes Film Festival.

== Cast ==
- Tawfik Filali
- Mohammed Touri
- Leila Wehby
