= List of Berlin International Film Festival jury presidents =

Each year, the jury of the Berlin International Film Festival is chaired by an internationally recognised personality of cinema. Being appointed to this position is the recognition of an outstanding career. This article lists all past presidents of the international jury, which is responsible for awarding the most prestigious prizes in the festival, including the Golden Bear and various Silver Bears.

== History ==
The winners of the first awards in 1951 were determined by an exclusively West German panel. The FIAPF (Fédération Internationale des Associations de Producteurs de Films) banned the awarding of jury prizes at the festival so between 1952 and 1955, the winners of the Golden Bear were determined by the audience members.

In 1956, FIAPF formally accredited the festival and since then the Golden Bear has been awarded by an international jury. In 2021 a jury presidency was not appointed for the first time since creation of the position.

The first foreign president of the jury and inaugural holder of this position was French film director Marcel Carné. The first woman who held the office of president of the jury was dancer Wendy Toye.

Since creation, no one has been appointed as president of the jury more than once.

== Main competition jury presidents ==
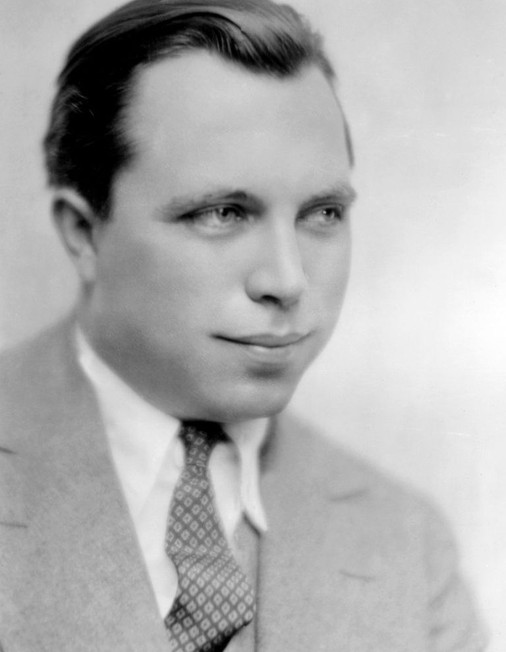
King Vidor, 1962 president.

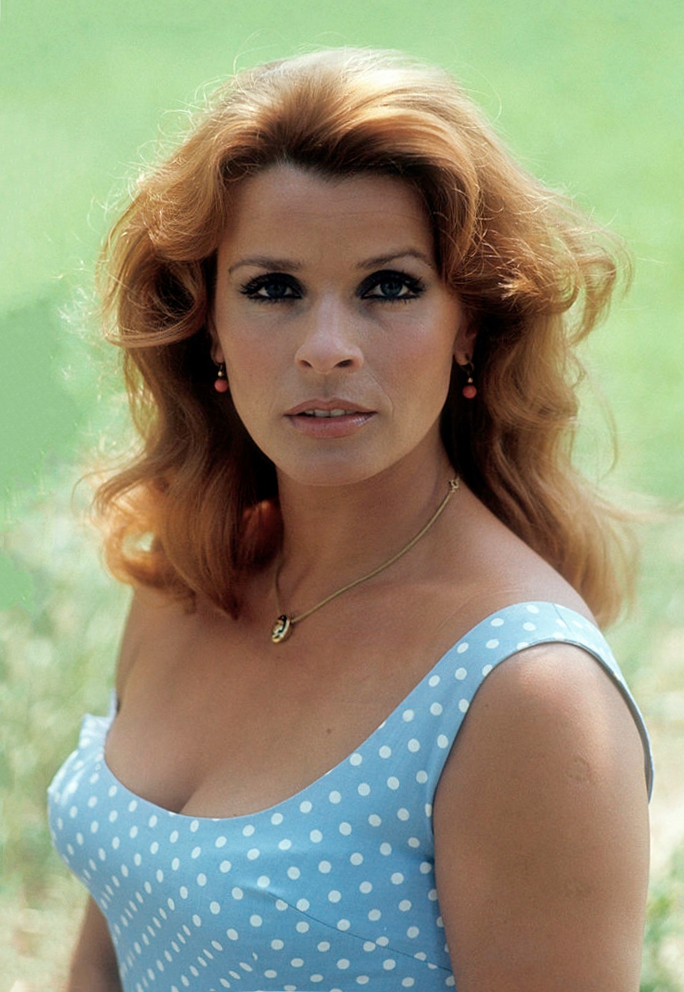
Senta Berger, 1977 president.

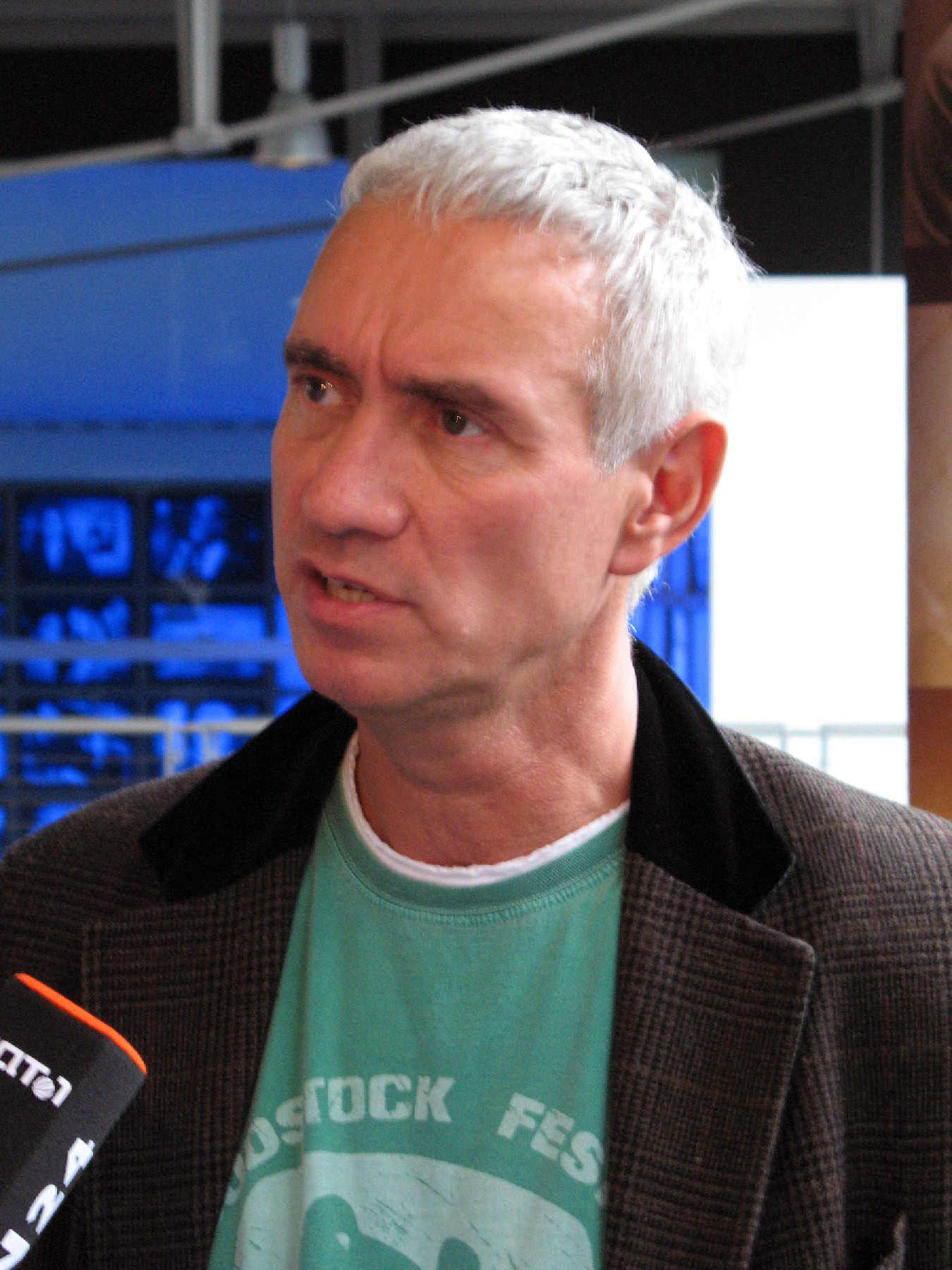
Roland Emmerich, 2005 president.

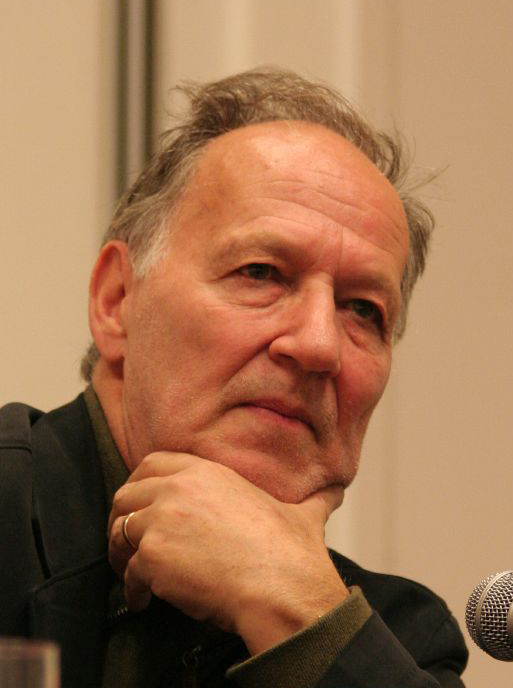
Werner Herzog, 2010 president.

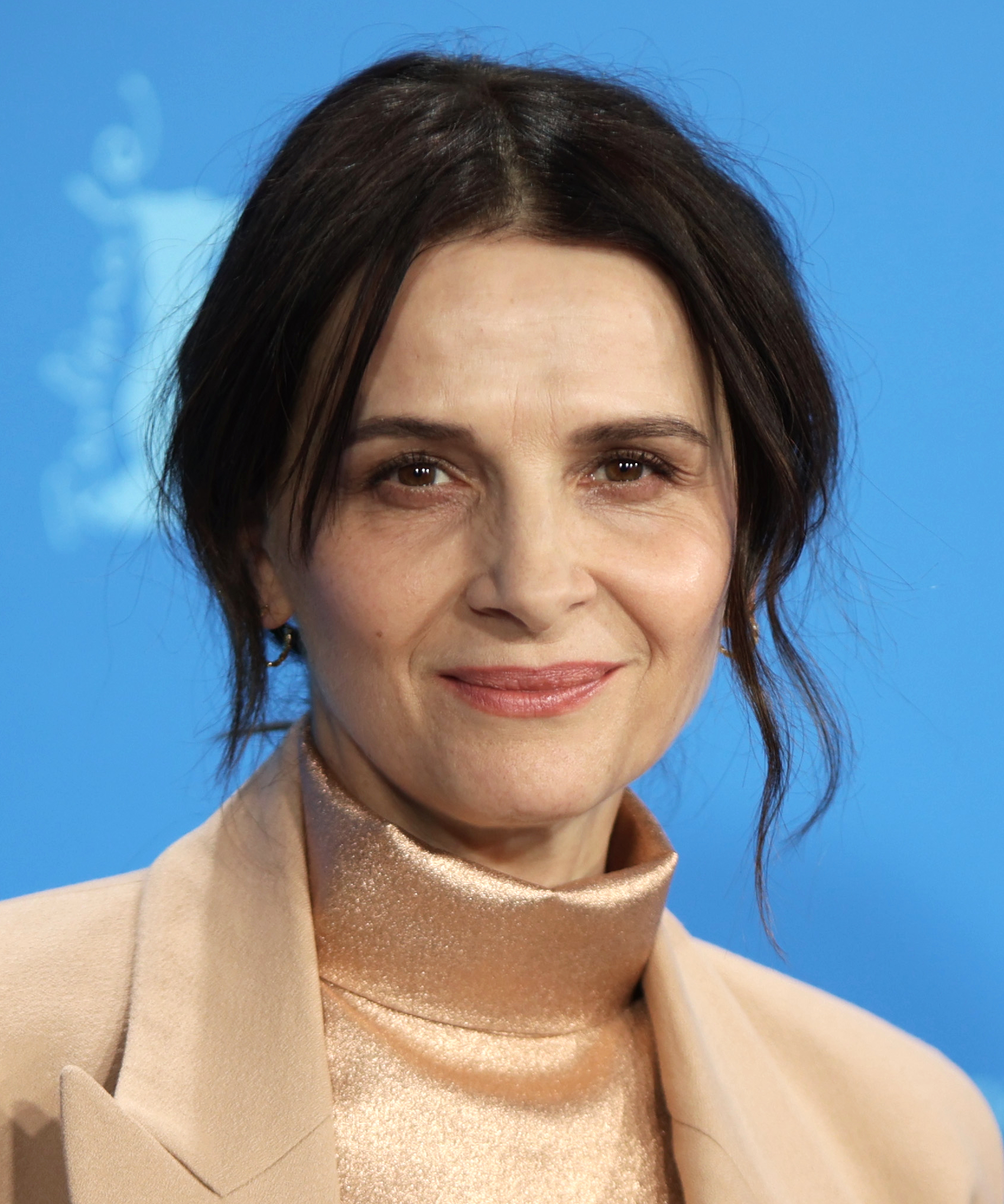
Juliette Binoche, 2019 president.

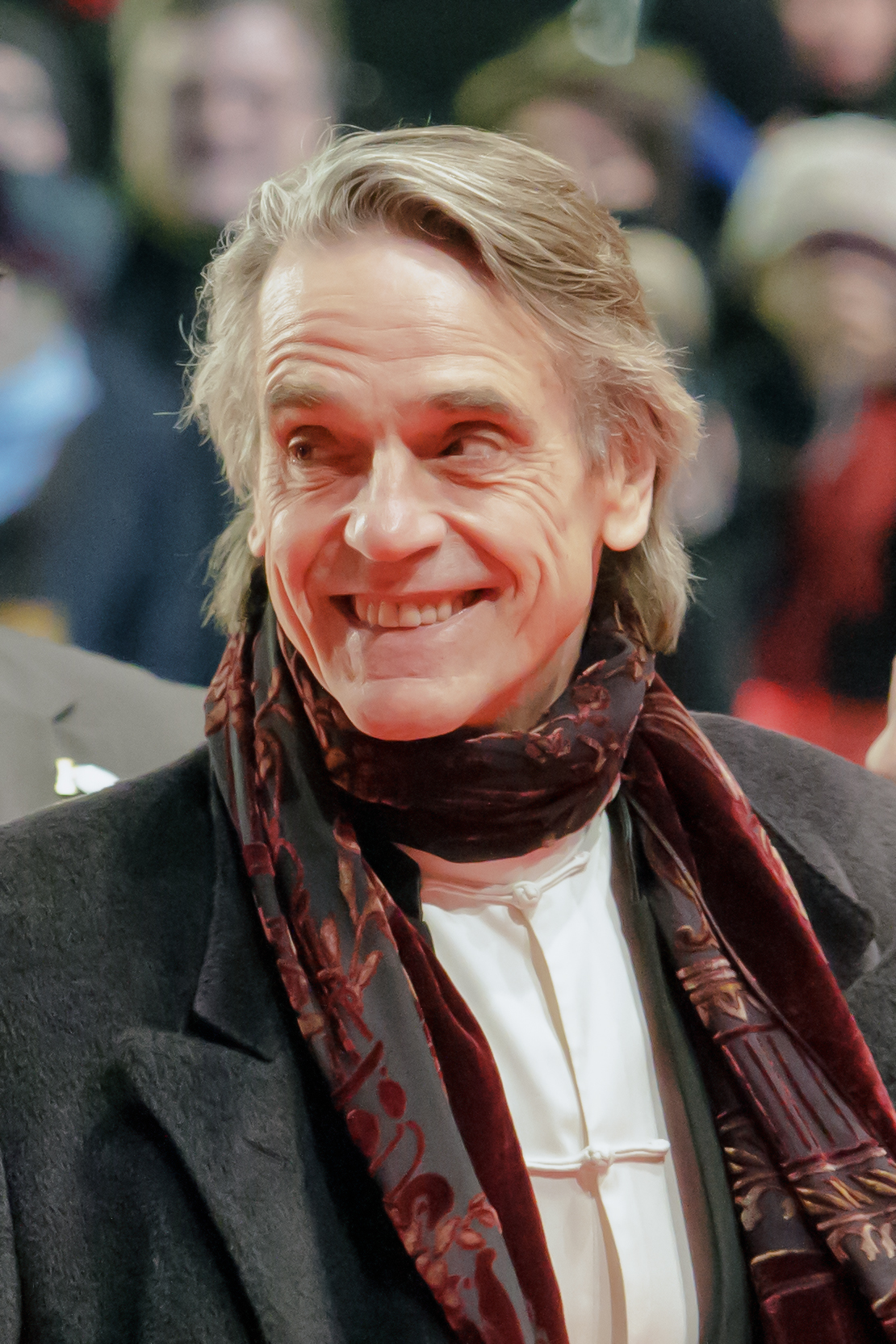
Jeremy Irons, 2020 president.

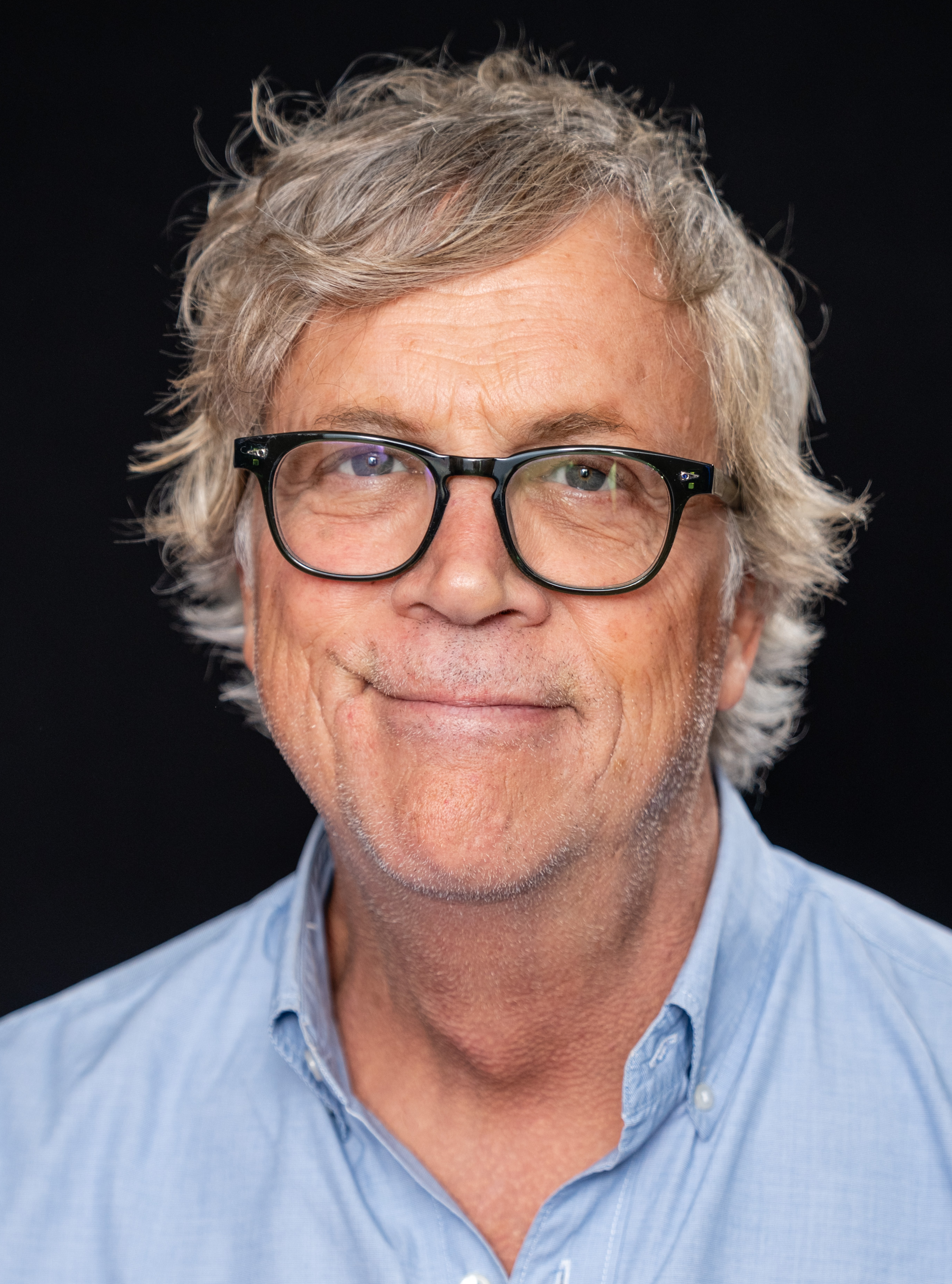
Todd Haynes, 2025 president.

Year	President	Profession
1956	(France) Marcel Carné	Filmmaker
1957	(United States) Jay Carmody	Film critic
1958	(United States) Frank Capra	Filmmaker
1959	(United States) Robert Aldrich	Filmmaker
1960	(United States) Harold Lloyd	Actor
1961	(United Kingdom) James Quinn	Film administrator
1962	(United States) King Vidor	Filmmaker
1963	(United Kingdom) Wendy Toye	Dancer
1964	(United States) Anthony Mann	Director and actor
1965	(United Kingdom) John Gillett	Film critic
1966	(France) Pierre Braunberger	Producer
1967	(United Kingdom) Thorold Dickinson	Filmmaker
1968	(Francoist Spain) Luis García Berlanga	Filmmaker
1969	(West Germany) Johannes Schaaf	Filmmaker
1970	(United States) George Stevens	Filmmaker
1971	(Denmark) Bjørn Rasmussen	Poet
1972	(United States) Eleanor Perry	Writer
1973	(United Kingdom) David Robinson	Film Critic
1974	(Argentina) Rodolfo Kuhn	Filmmaker
1975	(United Kingdom) Sylvia Syms	Actress
1976	(Poland) Jerzy Kawalerowicz	Filmmaker
1977	(Austria) Senta Berger	Actress
1978	(United States) Patricia Highsmith	Writer
1979	(Finland) Jörn Donner	Filmmaker
1980	(Sweden) Ingrid Thulin	Actress
1981	(West Germany) Jutta Brückner	Filmmaker
1982	(United States) Joan Fontaine	Actress
1983	(France) Jeanne Moreau	Actress
1984	(Norway) Liv Ullmann	Actress
1985	(France) Jean Marais	Actor
1986	(Italy) Gina Lollobrigida	Actress
1987	(Austria) Klaus Maria Brandauer	Actor
1988	(Italy) Guglielmo Biraghi	Film critic
1989	(Switzerland) Rolf Liebermann	Composer
1990	(West Germany) Michael Ballhaus	Cinematographer
1991	(Germany) Volker Schlöndorff	Filmmaker
1992	(France) Annie Girardot	Actress
1993	(Germany) Frank Beyer	Filmmaker
1994	(United Kingdom) Jeremy Thomas	Film producer
1995	(Israel) Lia van Leer	Film programmer and film archivist
1996	(Russia) Nikita Mikhalkov	Filmmaker and actor
1997	(France) Jack Lang	Politician
1998	(United Kingdom) Ben Kingsley	Actor
1999	(Spain) Ángela Molina	Actress
2000	(China) Gong Li	Actress
2001	(United States) Bill Mechanic	Film producer
2002	(India) Mira Nair	Filmmaker
2003	(Canada) Atom Egoyan	Filmmaker
2004	(United States) Frances McDormand	Actress
2005	(Germany) Roland Emmerich	Filmmaker
2006	(United Kingdom) Charlotte Rampling	Actress
2007	(United States) Paul Schrader	Filmmaker
2008	(France) (Greece) Costa-Gavras	Filmmaker
2009	(United Kingdom) Tilda Swinton	Actress
2010	(Germany) Werner Herzog	Filmmaker
2011	(Italy) Isabella Rossellini	Actress
2012	(United Kingdom) Mike Leigh	Filmmaker
2013	(Hong Kong) (China) Wong Kar-wai	Filmmaker
2014	(United States) James Schamus	Writer
2015	(United States) Darren Aronofsky	Filmmaker
2016	(United States) Meryl Streep	Actress
2017	(Netherlands) Paul Verhoeven	Filmmaker
2018	(Germany) Tom Tykwer	Filmmaker
2019	(France) Juliette Binoche	Actress
2020	(United Kingdom) Jeremy Irons	Actor
2021	No jury president (Note: In 2021, the directors of six previous Golden-Bear-winning films determined the awards for the Competition of the 71st Berlinale. There was no president of the jury that year. The jury members were Mohammad Rasoulof, Nadav Lapid, Adina Pintilie, Ildikó Enyedi, Gianfranco Rosi and Jasmila Žbanić.)	
2022	(India) (United States) M. Night Shyamalan	Filmmaker
2023	(United States) Kristen Stewart	Actress
2024	(Kenya) (Mexico) Lupita Nyong'o	Actress
2025	(United States) Todd Haynes	Filmmaker
2026	(Germany) Wim Wenders	Filmmaker

== See also ==
- List of Cannes Film Festival jury presidents
- List of Venice Film Festival jury presidents
