= North Shore (1949 film) =

- French: La Terre de Caïn
- Directed by: Pierre Petel
- Written by: Pierre Petel
- Produced by: James Beveridge
- Starring: Fred Davis; Max Ferguson; René Lecavalier
- Cinematography: Julien St-Georges
- Music by: Maurice Blackburn
- Production company: National Film Board of Canada
- Release date: 1949
- Running time: 21 minutes
- Country: Canada
- Languages: English; French

North Shore (La Terre de Caïn) is a 1949 Canadian short documentary film, directed by Pierre Petel.

The film shows the scenery, industry, fishing and general development of the north shore of the lower St. Lawrence River in the Côte-Nord region of Quebec. It was released in both French and English versions, with French narration by René Lecavalier and English narration by Fred Davis and Max Ferguson.

North Shore competed at the 1949 Cannes Film Festival. It won the 1950 Canadian Film Award for Best Theatrical Short. Petel also won an award from the Montreal Museum of Fine Arts for "Excursion in the Mingan Islands", a painting of rock formations in the Mingan Islands that he created while working on the film.
