= Pacific 231 (film) =

1949 film by Jean Mitry

Pacific 231 is a 1949 short film directed by French film theorist Jean Mitry.

== Music ==
The film soundtrack uses the orchestral work of the same name, composed by Arthur Honegger.

== Summary ==
Pacific 231 pays tribute to the steam locomotive featuring the SNCF 231E 24 ex Nord 3.1194, and includes close-up footage of driving wheels, running gear and railroad operations, mostly taken at speed, and cut/choreographed to the music.

== Reception and legacy ==
The film was awarded the Short Film Palme d'Or, the highest prize given for a short film at the 1949 Cannes Film Festival.

Stanley Kubrick cited this as one of his favorite films and praised its editing.
