= Lies of Love =

1949 Italian film

- Directed by: Michelangelo Antonioni
- Written by: Michelangelo Antonioni
- Starring: Annie O'Hara
- Cinematography: Renato Del Frate
- Music by: Giovanni Fusco
- Production companies: Filmus; Edizioni Fortuna
- Release date: 1949
- Running time: 11 minutes
- Country: Italy
- Language: Italian

Lies of Love (Italian: L'amorosa menzogna) is a 1949 Italian short documentary film directed by Michelangelo Antonioni about a group of people who pose for photo comics.

== Cast ==
- Annie O'Hara
- Sergio Raimondi
- Sandro Roberti
- Anna Vita

== Release ==
Lies of Love was screened at the 1949 Cannes Film Festival.

== Legacy ==
Antonioni used the research for his documentary for a story idea which was later adapted for Federico Fellini's film The White Sheik. According to Fellini, Antonioni, although he received screen credit, was not involved in the writing of the screenplay.

Lies of Love has been screened as part of retrospectives on Antonioni at various festivals and institutions, including the Museum of Modern Art, the Berkeley Art Museum and Pacific Film Archive, and the Cinémathèque Française.
