= 1947 Cannes Film Festival =

2nd Cannes Film Festival
- Official poster of the 2nd Cannes Film Festival illustrated by Jean-Luc
- Location: Cannes, France
- Founded: 1946
- Awards: Grand Prix
- Festival date: September 12–25, 1947
- Website: www.festival-cannes.com

Cannes Film Festival
- 1949 1946

The 2nd Cannes Film Festival was held from 12 to 25 September 1947. The new building that was meant to host the festival, the Palais du Festival, was still not ready, and the festival was held amid many technical and financial problems. In 1947, the entire jury of the Festival was French. Six awards were given to films of different categories.

== Jury ==
The following persons were selected as the jury for the feature and short films:

- Georges Huisman (historian) - Jury President
- Raymond Borderie (CNC official)
- Georges Carriere (cinephile)
- Jean-François Chosson (CNC official)
- Joseph Dotti (cinephile)
- Escoute (City of Cannes official)
- Jean Grémillon (director)
- Maurice Hille (cinephile)
- Robert Hubert (production designer)
- Alexandre Kamenka (producer)
- Jean Mineur (CNCF official)
- Henri Moret (cinephile)
- Jean Nery (critic)
- Maurice Perisset (cinephile)
- Georges Raguis (union official)
- René Jeanne (critic)
- Georges Rollin (actor)
- Régis Roubin (cinephile)
- Marc-Gilbert Sauvajon (director)
- Segalon (cinephile)
- René Sylviano (composer)

== Films in competition ==
The following feature films competed for the Grand Prix:

- Les Amants du pont Saint-Jean by Henri Decoin
- Antoine et Antoinette by Jacques Becker
- Boomerang! by Elia Kazan
- The Captain's Daughter (La figlia del capitano) by Mario Camerini
- The Cat (La gata) by Mario Soffici
- The Chase by Arthur Ripley
- Crossfire by Edward Dmytryk
- The Damned (Les Maudits) by René Clément
- Dumbo by Ben Sharpsteen
- Flesh Will Surrender (Il delitto di Giovanni Episcopo) by Alberto Lattuada
- Ivy by Sam Wood
- The Jolson Story by Alfred E. Green
- Les jeux sont faits by Jean Delannoy
- Lost in the Dark (Sperduti nel buio) by Camillo Mastrocinque
- Marouf, the Cairo Cobbler (Marouf Savetier du Caire) by Jean Mauran
- Mine Own Executioner by Anthony Kimmins
- Paris 1900 by Nicole Vedres
- Possessed by Curtis Bernhardt
- A Ship Bound for India (Skeep till India land) by Ingmar Bergman
- Song of Dolores (La copla de la Dolores) by Benito Perojo
- The Strange Love of Martha Ivers by Lewis Milestone
- A Tanítónő (The Teacher) by Márton Keleti
- Two Women (Två kvinnor) by Arnold Sjostrand
- Ziegfeld Follies by Vincente Minnelli

== Short films ==
The following short films competed for the Grand Prix du court métrage:

- Aux portes du monde saharien by Robert Vernay
- Bianchi pascoli by Luciano Emmer
- Cacciatori Sottomarini by Alliata
- Caravane Boréale by Hugh Wallace
- De Stichter by Charles Dekeukeleire
- Escale Au Soleil by Henri Verneuil
- Inondations en Pologne by Jerzy Bossak, Wacław Kaźmierczak
- L'Ile Aux Morts by Norman Mclaren
- L'Oeuvre Biologique de Pasteur by Jean Painlevé
- La Petite République by Victor Vicas
- Les Danseurs D'Echternach by Evy Friedrich
- New Faces Come Back by Richard Davis
- Rhapsodie de Saturne by Jean Image
- Risveglio di Primavera by Pietro Francisci
- Symphonie Berbère by André Zwoboda
- Tea For Teacher by W. M. Larkins

== Awards ==
The following films and people received the 1947 awards: Feature Films

- Best Musical Comedy: Ziegfeld Follies by Vincente Minnelli (Grand Prix – Comédies musicales)
- Best Psychological and Love Film: Antoine et Antoinette by Jacques Becker (Grand Prix – Films psychologiques et d'amour)
- Best Animation Design: Dumbo by Ben Sharpsteen (Grand Prix – Dessin animé)
- Best Social Film: Crossfire by Edward Dmytryk (Grand Prix – Films sociaux)
- Best Adventure and Crime Film: The Damned (Les Maudits) by René Clément (Grand Prix – Films d'aventures et policiers)

Short Films

- Best Short Film: Inondations en Pologne by Jerzy Bossak, Wacław Kaźmierczak (Grand Prix – Documentaires)
- Best Avant-garde Film: Meshes of the Afternoon by Maya Deren, Alexander Hammid (Grand Prix – Films d’Avant-garde)

== Media ==
- Institut National de l'Audiovisuel: Opening of the 1947 Festival (commentary in French)
- INA: Stars at the 1947 Festival (mute)
- INA: Construction of the Palais des festivals (commentary in French)
