= Jean Perdrix =

French film director

Jean Perdrix was a French film director who was a member of the committee for short films at the Festival de Cannes in 1955 and 1956.

== Filmography ==
Director

- 1951 : Le hasard mène l'enquête (short film)
- 1952 : Mort en sursis (short film)
- 1949 : L'Enfer des fards
- 1948 : Au pays des grands pâturages

Unit production manager

- 1955 : Les salauds vont en enfer
- 1953 : J'y suis, j'y reste (pièce de théâtre)
