= Tetsurō Furukaki =

Japanese Rotarian and diplomat (1900–1987)

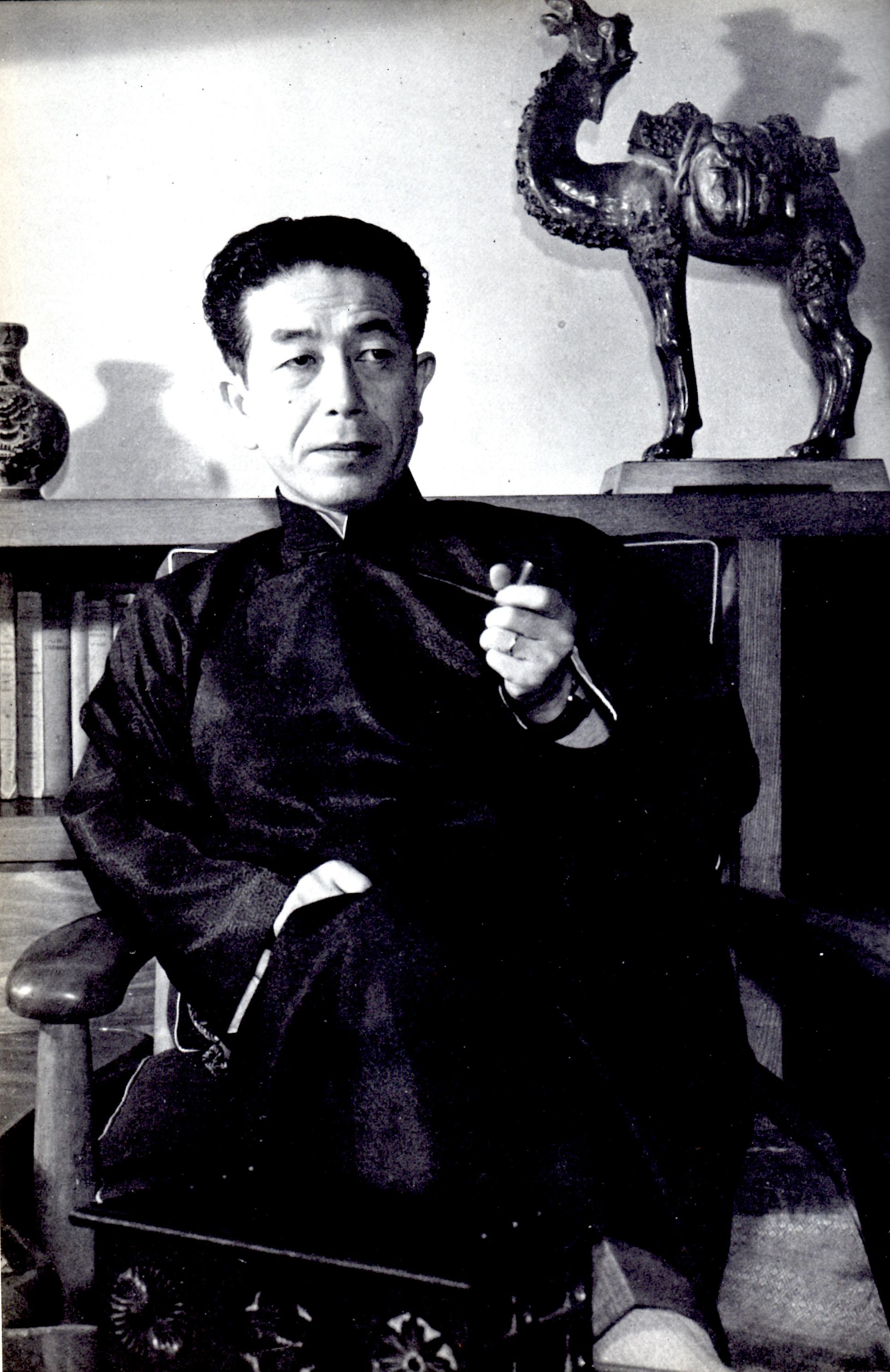
Tetsurō Furukaki circa 1953

Tetsurō Furukaki (20 September 1900 – 8 March 1987) was a Japanese journalist and diplomat.

== Biography ==
Furukaki attended Daiichi High School and studied at the Lyon Law School. After graduating, he worked in the Information Department of the League of Nations Secretariat from 1923 to 1929. Furukaki joined The Asahi Shimbun newspaper in 1929. He worked in London and Paris and served as chief of the European bureau.

After World War II, Furukaki became a member of the House of Peers in 1946. He became president of NHK broadcast company. He served as the Japanese ambassador to France from 1957 to 1961.

He was a jury member for the Cannes Film Festival in 1962 (when he also served as president of the jury) and 1966.
