= Jean Mitry =

French film theorist (1903–1988)

Mitry on the cover of his book The Aesthetics and Psychology of the Cinema

Jean-René Pierre Goetgheluck Le Rouge Tillard des Acres de Presfontaines, whose pseudonym was Jean Mitry (French: [mitʁi]; 7 November 1904 – 18 January 1988), was a French film theorist, critic and filmmaker, a co-founder of France's first film society, and, in 1938, of the Cinémathèque Française.

== Work ==
Goetgheluck le Rouge Rillard des Acres de Presfontaines was born in Soissons and was the first lecturer of film aesthetics in France. Mitry was one of the first intellectuals responsible for taking film studies out of the era of the film club and into that of the university.

Mitry was one of few major film theorists who worked in film production himself. He edited Alexandre Astruc's short film Le Rideau Cramoisi (1953) and directed two films of his own, Pacific 231 (1949), set to Arthur Honegger's music, and Images pour Debussy (1952), set to the music of Claude Debussy.

He died in La Garenne-Colombes in 1988.

== Selected filmography ==
- The Enigma of the Folies-Bergere (1959)

== Works ==
- Introduction to film aesthetics (1960)
- Dictionary of cinema (1963)
- The Aesthetics and Psychology of the Cinema (1965)
- History of cinema, 5 volumes (1967–1980)
- Experimental Cinema: History and perspectives (1974)
- Semiotics and the Analysis of Film (new edition 2000)

== Sources ==
- Aitken, Ian (4 January 2013). The Concise Routledge Encyclopedia of the Documentary Film. Routledge. ISBN 978-1-136-51206-3.
- Andrew, J. Dudley (15 April 1976). The Major Film Theories: An Introduction. Oxford University Press. ISBN 978-0-19-987844-4.
- Bluher, Dominique (2005). Le court métrage français de 1945 à 1968: De l'âge d'or aux contrebandiers (in French). Presses universitaires de Rennes. ISBN 978-2-7535-0061-7.
- Tazi, Mohamed Abderrahman; Dwyer, Kevin (25 November 2004). Beyond Casablanca: M. A. Tazi and the Adventure of Moroccan Cinema. Indiana University Press. ISBN 978-0-253-21719-6.
