= Louis Chauvet =

French writer and journalist (1906–1981)

- Born: 27 July 1906; Perpignan, France
- Died: 18 April 1981 (aged 74); Menucourt, France
- Occupations: Novelist; Journalist president of the International Federation of Film Press.

Louis Chauvet (27 July 1906 in Perpignan – 18 April 1981 in Menucourt) was a 20th-century French writer and journalist, winner of the 1953 prix Interallié.

== Biography ==
The son of the regionalist historian Horace Chauvet, Louis Chauvet became a journalist at Temps, Comœdia, and Le Figaro where he mainly worked in the film department. In this capacity he was the president of the International Federation of the Film Press. Also a novelist, he was awarded the 1953 Prix Interallié published by Fammarion for L'Air sur la quatrième corde.

== Works ==
- 1977: L'Été d'osseja, la Pensée Universelle, Prix Broquette-Gonin (literature)
- 1965: La "poïétique" de Paul Valéry
- 1961: Le Cinéma à travers le monde (essai) cowritten with Jean Fayard and Pierre Mazars
- 1956: La Petite Acrobate de l'Helvétia
- 1953: L'Air sur la quatrième corde — Prix Interallié
- 1950: Le porte-plume et la camera
- 1949: Furieusement tendre
- 1928: Les Sports et le droit pénal. Discours prononcé à la séance solennelle de réouverture de la Conférence des avocats stagiaires, le 14 janvier 1928
