= Mario Gromo =

Italian journalist, writer, film-critic (1901–1960)

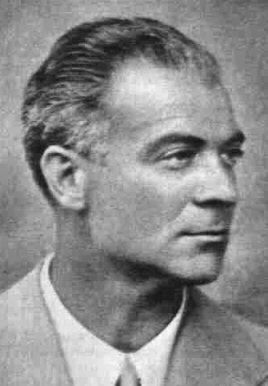
- Born: 23 May 1901; Novara, Italy
- Died: 19 May 1960 (aged 58); Turin, Italy

Mario Gromo (23 May 1901, in Novara – 19 May 1960, in Turin) was a journalist, writer and Italian film critic.

In 1918, he volunteered for First World War. He earned his law degree and practiced for a short time as a lawyer, finally arriving in the world of literature. He founded in 1922, together with Giacomo Debenedetti and Sergio Salvi, Primo Tempo magazine, and in 1927, a publishing house that audience the most important texts of Italian literature of the period as hosting authors Corrado Alvaro, Ugo Betti, Guido Piovene, Giani Stuparich. He contributed to literary magazines such as Il Baretti of Piero Gobetti and Solaria.

He wrote Costazzurra, Guida Sentimentale and other books of tales of travel including Taccuino Giapponese.

He was also one of the greatest representatives of film criticism which has edited a column in La Stampa.
