= Rostislav Yurenev =

Soviet and Russian film critic and teacher (1912-2002)

Rostislav Nikolaevich Yurenev (Russian: Ростислав Николаевич Юренев; 12 April [O.S. 31 March] 1912 – 28 May 2002) was a Soviet and Russian film critic, teacher, Honored Artist of the RSFSR (1969), Doctor of Arts (1961).

== Biography ==
Yurenev was born April 13, 1912, in Vitebsk. His father was a prominent lawyer and criminologist, served in the judiciary, and after the October Revolution he worked as a legal adviser for a Revolutionary Military Council.

As an author and editor he published three-volume "Essays on the Soviet Cinema" (1956–1961), six-volume "Selected Works of Eisenstein"(1964–1971), and other scientific papers and publications on theoretical heritage of the classics of domestic and foreign cinema. He has published 44 books. Among them, "The Soviet Biographic Film" (1949), "Alexander Dovzhenko" (1959), "The Soviet Comedy" (1964), "Funny on the Screen" (1964), "Innovation and tradition of Soviet cinema" (1965), "A Brief History Soviet Cinema" (1979), "A Wonderful Window. A Brief History of World Cinema "(1983), a two-volume monograph "Sergei Eisenstein. Plan. Movies. Method" (1985–1989) and others.

Yurenev was also the author of the scripts for more than ten documentary films, including "Sergei Eisenstein" (1958), "Vsevolod Pudovkin" (1960), "The Birth of Soviet Cinema" (1968), "Kino Says about Himself" (1969), "Ivan Pyryev "(1979).

In 1997 he published his lyrical collection "Poems from the Cherished Box."

In 2007, a posthumous memoir "In Justification of This Life" was published.
