= Suzanne Borel =

Early French female diplomat

Marie Nancy Suzanne Bidault

Marie Nancy Suzanne "Suzy" Bidault (née Borel; 18 October 1904 – 8 November 1995) was the first French woman to become a diplomat when she was employed as an attaché at the Quai d'Orsay on 1 July 1930 after passing the entrance examination to the French Foreign Ministry. After serving there for 15 years, she married the French foreign minister Georges Bidault.

== Early life and education ==
Borel was born in Toulon on 18 October 1904, the daughter of Élie Borel, a graduate of the École Polytechnique and a colonel assigned to the French colonies, and Louise Fontan, whose father Jules Fontan was a celebrated navy physician. Her childhood, spent in France, Senegal, Madagascar and Vietnam, included a secondary education in Dakar, Toulon, Nîmes and Montpellier. After obtaining her baccalauréat in 1922, she first studied philosophy graduating in 1927. She went on to study Chinese at the École des langues orientale and at the École des Sciences Politiques.

In February 1928, her mother sent her a newspaper cutting from Le Temps announcing a decree permitting women to take the competitive examination for entry into the diplomatic service. She had always dreamt of becoming a diplomat but it had been a career open to men only. Her first attempt at the examination was not successful but after the director of Sciences Po, René Saydoux, allowed her to participate in a special preparatory course, she succeeded in passing the examination the following year, becoming the first woman to enter France's diplomatic service.

== Career ==
On entering the Foreign Ministry, Borel was informed that she would not be able to work in the many departments which were still reserved for men and was asked to sign a document confirming her understanding that she would only be permitted to work in the Paris offices of the minister. Even there, the only areas open to her would be the press, the department overseeing French participation in the League of Nations, and that regulating French works abroad, the one to which she was finally assigned. She remained there until 1944, latterly in Vichy. In her own words, "It was a sort of depository dealing with sports, the press and associations as well as with French charities abroad."

During the German occupation, Borel distinguished herself as a resistance worker. In May 1944, the Gestapo tried to arrest her, forcing her into hiding. When the war was over, Georges Bidault, the new foreign minister, invited her to work for him, promising her a post in Kiev. But it never materialized as they married in January 1946.

After working independently in the diplomatic service for 15 years, she entered the traditional career of a diplomat's wife, accompanying him on trips abroad, at receptions and on election campaigns. In 1952, she took up part-time employment at the Office français de protection des réfugiés et apatrides (French Office for the Protection of Refugees and Stateless Persons).

Suzanne Borel died in Paris on 8 November 1995, aged 91. She had been honoured with the Légion d'honneur, Croix de Guerre, Médaille de la Résistance and the Medal of Freedom.

== Selected publications ==
- Bidault, Suzanne (1971). Je n'ai pas oublié ... La Table Ronde. ISBN 2710313669.
- Bidault, Suzanne (1972). Par une porte entrebaillée: ou, Comment les Françaises entrèrent dans la carrière. La Table Ronde. ISBN 2710315343.
- Bidault, Suzanne (1973). Souvenirs de guerre et d'occupation. La Table ronde. ISBN 2710316730.
- Bidault, Suzanne (1987). Souvenirs. Ouest-France. ISBN 978-2-7373-0024-0.
