= Georges Huisman =

French historian (1889–1957)

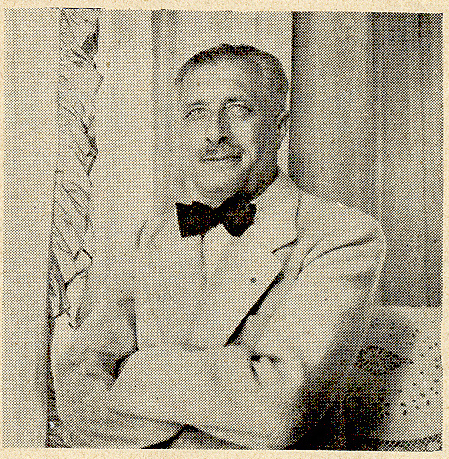
- Georges Huisman
- Born: 3 May 1889; Valenciennes
- Died: 28 December 1957 (aged 68); Paris
- Occupations: Historian, Politician

Georges Huisman (3 May 1889 – 28 December 1957) was a French historian and politician who served as the Jury President of the Cannes Film Festival from 1946 to 1949. He also served as the mayor of Valmondois from 1932 to 1939.

He founded the Cannes Film Festival at the behest of the French Minister of National Education and Fine Arts Jean Zay. Their goal was to create a film festival that would rival the prestige of the Venice Film Festival. He subsequently was jury president during the first three years of the festival.

== Biography ==
He was born in Valenciennes on 3 May 1889. He graduated with a history degree from the École Nationale des Chartes. He died on 28 December 1957 in Paris.

== Career ==
Throughout his career, he held various positions in the French Government, such as the Director-General of Fine Arts. However, after the defeat of France in the Second World War, he was relieved of his responsibilities by the Vichy Regime largely because he was Jewish.

== See also ==
- Cannes Film Festival
- Academie Francaise
