= Up to His Ears =

- Original film poster by Yves Thos
- Directed by: Philippe de Broca
- Screenplay by: Daniel Boulanger
- Based on: Tribulations of a Chinaman in China by Jules Verne
- Produced by: Georges Dancigers; Alexandre Mnouchkine
- Starring: Jean-Paul Belmondo; Ursula Andress
- Cinematography: Edmond Séchan
- Edited by: Françoise Javet
- Music by: Georges Delerue
- Color process: Eastmancolor
- Production companies: Les Films Ariane; Les Productions Artistes Associés; Vides Cinematografica
- Distributed by: Les Artistes Associés
- Release date: 4 December 1965 (France)
- Running time: 109 minutes
- Countries: France; Italy
- Language: French
- Box office: 2,701,748 admissions (France)

Up to His Ears (French: Les Tribulations d'un Chinois en Chine or in English, "Tribulations of a Chinaman in China") is a 1965 French-Italian international co-production adventure comedy film starring Jean Paul Belmondo and Ursula Andress. It was an indirect sequel to That Man from Rio reuniting many of the same team; directed by Philippe de Broca written by Daniel Boulanger, stunt work by Gil Delamare it was loosely based on the 1879 novel Tribulations of a Chinaman in China by Jules Verne.

== Plot ==
Millionaire Arthur Lempereur is bored with life. He tries to kill himself but fails, then decides to travel to Hong Kong to see if his depression can be cured.

In Hong Kong, Arthur discovers that his money is gone. Mister Goh, his old tutor and a Chinese philosopher, makes him take out a life insurance policy to benefit Alice, Arthur's fiancée, and Mister Goh. Goh promises to kill Arthur for him.

Arthur then meets Alexandrine, an ethnologist and striptease dancer. He decides not to die, and goes to track down Goh before Goh can hire a hitman.

== Cast ==
- Jean Paul Belmondo as Arthur Lempereur
- Ursula Andress as Alexandrine Pinardel
- Jean Rochefort as Leon
- Maria Pacôme as Suzy Ponchabert
- Valérie Lagrange as Alice Ponchabert
- Valéry Inkijinoff as Mr. Goh
- Joe Saïd as Charlie Fallinster
- Mario David as Roquentin
- Paul Préboist as Cornac
- Jess Hahn as Cornelius Ponchabert
- Darry Cowl as Biscoton

== Production ==
In addition to its footage of China, the film contains several minutes of the Agra area in India, including the Taj Mahal, which appears much whiter than it does today. The film also includes approximately 15 minutes of footage of the central area of Kathmandu, Nepal, the nearby Swayambunath hillside temple and more rural mountain areas of Nepal, with the impressive Himalayas as the backdrop.

Filming started under the title Chinese Adventures in China on January 5, 1965 in Nepal. Ursula Andress left for Hong Kong in February 1965. Filming took place in Hong Kong and Paris.

In January 1966, the title was changed to Up to His Ears.

== Reception ==
The film was the tenth-most popular of 1965 in France, after The Sucker, Goldfinger, Thunderball, Gendarme in New York, Mary Poppins, Fantomas Unleashed, God's Thunder, The Wise Guys and Viva Maria!.
