= Cartouche (film) =

1962 film

- Directed by: Philippe de Broca
- Written by: Daniel Boulanger; Philippe de Broca; Charles Spaak
- Produced by: Georges Dancigers; Alexandre Mnouchkine
- Starring: Jean-Paul Belmondo; Claudia Cardinale
- Cinematography: Christian Matras
- Edited by: Laurence Méry-Clark
- Music by: Georges Delerue
- Distributed by: Cinedis
- Release date: March 7, 1962
- Running time: 114 minutes
- Countries: France; Italy
- Language: French
- Box office: 3,610,412 admissions (France)

Cartouche is a 1962 French adventure film directed by Philippe de Broca and starring Jean-Paul Belmondo and Claudia Cardinale.

== Plot ==
In the 18th century, Louis Dominique Bourguignon works with Malichot's gang, but finds their methods too unethical. He flees from Malichot and joins the army, where he and his two new friends survive by hiding on the battlefield. Together, they rob the general of his gold. Fleeing, they seek refuge at an inn where they meet Venus, a beautiful gypsy who has been taken prisoner. Bourguignon rescues her and she joins his gang.

Returning to Paris, Bourguignon establishes his own gang, operating under the name Cartouche, with many former members of Malichot's gang joining him. They conduct daring robberies targeting the wealthy and redistribute the stolen wealth to the poor. Cartouche gains the sympathy of the people, Venus's love, and the enmity of both Malichot and the authorities.

Malichot, seeking revenge, betrays Cartouche to the police. Despite evading numerous traps, Cartouche cannot escape the snares of love. Eventually, the authorities capitalize on this vulnerability and set a trap while he is rendezvousing with Venus in the countryside. He is captured, but his men ambush the guards during his escort. In the ensuing chaos, Venus sacrifices her life to save Cartouche.

In mourning, Cartouche and his men place Venus's body in a stolen nobleman's carriage and sink it in a lake. As the carriage slowly disappears beneath the surface, Cartouche orders his men to scatter, vowing to avenge Venus's death—a path he knows will likely lead him to the gallows.

== Cast ==
- Jean-Paul Belmondo - Louis-Dominique Bourguignon alias Cartouche
- Claudia Cardinale - Vénus
- Jess Hahn - La Douceur
- Marcel Dalio - Malichot
- Jean Rochefort - La Taupe
- Philippe Lemaire - Gaston de Ferrussac
- Noël Roquevert - the recruiting sergeant
- Odile Versois - Isabelle de Ferrussac
- Jacques Charon - the colonel
- Lucien Raimbourg - the maréchal
- Jacques Balutin - Capucine, the monk
- Pierre Repp - the Marquis of Griffe
- Jacques Hilling - the hotel keeper
- Paul Préboist - a gendarme
- René Marlic - Petit Oncle, the inn keeper

== Production ==
The shooting took place from July 17 to October 6, 1961 in Béziers, Ermenonville and Pézenas. Other locations were Aveyron, Guermantes, Lagny-sur-Marne and Senlis. The film sets were designed by François de Lamothe, and Rosine Delamare was responsible for the costumes.

== Reception ==
The film was a massive success at the French box office.

== See also ==
- Cartouche, King of Paris (1950)
