= Françoise Javet =

French film editor

- Born: 17 January 1922; Paris, France
- Died: 25 February 2008 (aged 86); Colombes, France
- Occupation: Film editor
- Years active: 1947-1988

Françoise Javet (17 January 1922 - 25 February 2008) was a French film editor who was active in France between 1947 and 1988. In 1982, she was nominated for a César Award for her work editing La Balance.

== Selected filmography ==
- Bonjour l'angoisse (1988)
- Flag (1987)
- La gitane (1986)
- How Did You Get In? We Didn't See You Leave (1984)
- La balance (1982)
- Psy (1981)
- Molière (1978)
- Dear Inspector (1977)
- Boomerang (1976)
- Incorrigible (1975)
- Vous ne l'emporterez pas au paradis (1975)
- The Down-in-the-Hole Gang (1974)
- Two Men in Town (1973)
- Il n'y a pas de fumée sans feu (1973)
- Scoumoune (1972)
- The Annuity (1972)
- The Deadly Trap (1971)
- Rider on the Rain (1970)
- The Devil by the Tail (1969)
- The Comedians (1967)
- King of Hearts (1966)
- Up to His Ears (1965)
- Male Companion (1964)
- That Man from Rio (1964)
- A King Without Distraction (1963)
- We Will Go to Deauville (1962)
- And Satan Calls the Turns (1962)
- A View from the Bridge (1962)
- Me faire ça à moi (1961)
- Black Tights (1961)
- Purple Noon (1960)
- La marraine de Charley (1959)
- Taxi, Trailer and Corrida (1958)
- Women Are Talkative (1958)
- Club of Women (1956)
- L'inspecteur connaît la musique (1956)
- Diamond Machine (1955)
- The Doctors (1955)
- Lovers, Happy Lovers! (1954)
