= Dear Louise =

1972 film

- Directed by: Philippe de Broca
- Written by: Jean-Louis Curtis; Jean-Loup Dabadie
- Produced by: Georges Dancigers; Alexandre Mnouchkine
- Starring: Jeanne Moreau
- Cinematography: Ricardo Aronovich
- Edited by: Françoise Javet
- Music by: Georges Delerue
- Distributed by: Warner-Columbia Film
- Release date: 6 September 1972
- Running time: 105 minutes
- Country: France
- Language: French

Dear Louise (French: Chère Louise) is a 1972 French drama film directed by Philippe de Broca, and starring Jeanne Moreau. It was entered into the 1972 Cannes Film Festival. In July 2021, the film was shown in the Cannes Classics section at the 2021 Cannes Film Festival.

== Cast ==
- Jeanne Moreau as Louise
- Julian Negulesco as Luigi
- Didi Perego as Frédérique
- Yves Robert as Magnetto, le marchand de cycles
- Pippo Starnazza
- Lucienne Legrand as La logeuse
- Jenny Arasse
- Toni Arasse
- Luce Fabiole
- Jill Larson
- Louis Navarre
