= Tender Scoundrel =

- Directed by: Jean Becker
- Written by: Jean Becker; Daniel Boulanger; Albert Simonin; Michel Audiard
- Produced by: Paul-Edmond Decharme
- Starring: Jean Paul Belmondo; Stefania Sandrelli; Nadja Tiller; Jean-Pierre Marielle; Geneviève Page; Robert Morley; Mylène Demongeot
- Cinematography: Edmond Séchan
- Edited by: Monique Kirsanoff
- Music by: Michel Legrand
- Distributed by: SN Prodis
- Release date: 21 September 1966
- Running time: 95 minutes
- Countries: France; Italy
- Language: French
- Box office: $14.8 million

Tender Scoundrel (French: Tendre voyou, Italian: Un avventuriero a Tahiti) is a 1966 French-Italian comedy film starring Jean Paul Belmondo and directed by Jean Becker.

It recorded admissions in France of 1,970,023.

== Plot ==
After crashing an expensive item of stock in Paris, secondhand car salesman Tony is penniless and homeless. He solves the second by persuading an old flame to take him in and decides to tackle the first in alliance with his friend Bob, a taxi driver, by betting on the horses. At the races he meets and charms Muriel, mistress of a rich industrialist named Gabriel. She takes him as cover on a skiing holiday in the Alps, where she can meet up with Gabriel whenever he can get away from his wife Béatrice. The plan works well, because Béatrice falls for Tony. He however is struck by the Baroness von Strasshofer, who offers to take him as her companion on her yacht, moored at Cannes and sailing for Tahiti. She also lets the faithful Bob on as crew.

Tony gets worn out by the insatiable demands of the Baroness and befriends an innocent young passenger called Véronique, who says she is going to Tahiti to claim her inheritance and will not sleep with him. Once at Tahiti, the Baroness finds herself a new young man and, jealous of Tony's attentions to Véronique, slings him and Bob off the boat. After meeting a drunken old beachcomber who says there is a workable deposit of manganese on a deserted atoll, they find Véronique. She has been given the name of her family property, an isolated island, and sailing to it with her they find a mineshaft. Bringing up some metal ore, they take it back to Tahiti for analysis, which proves it to be valuable manganese. After strenuous bargaining, Tony sells the mineral rights to an English businessman. When he gives the cheque to Véronique, she does not fall into his arms but into those of her overjoyed father, who had planted the manganese and acted as the sozzled beachcomber.

Penniless and homeless, Tony and Bob work their way back to France as crew. There Tony is knocked down by the Rolls of a wealthy widow, who takes him to her luxurious apartment and puts him in her own bed for attention. He is last seen, worn out by her demands, running free through Paris.

== Cast ==
- Jean-Paul Belmondo as Antoine Maréchal, a.k.a. Tony
- Jean-Pierre Marielle as Bob
- Philippe Noiret as Gabriel Dumonceaux
- Geneviève Page as Béatrice Dumonceaux
- Mylène Demongeot as Muriel
- Paul Mercey as M. Ponce
- Maria Pacôme as Germaine, a.k.a. Mémère
- Nadja Tiller as Minna von Strasshofer
- Robert Morley as Lord Edouard Swift
- Stefania Sandrelli as Véronique
- Marcel Dalio as Véronique's father
- Ellen Bahl as Josette
- Micheline Dax as Marjorie
- Michèle Girardon as Ritz's daughter
- Paula Dehelly as Mlle Aline
- Peter Carsten as Otto Hanz
- Ivan Desny as Vendor in Cannes
- Oja Kodar
