= The Devil by the Tail =

- Directed by: Philippe de Broca
- Screenplay by: Daniel Boulanger; Claude Sautet
- Story by: Daniel Boulanger; Philippe de Brocca (uncredited)
- Produced by: Philippe de Broca; Alberto Grimaldi
- Starring: Yves Montand; Madeleine Renaud; Maria Schell; Jean Rochefort; Jean-Pierre Marielle; Marthe Keller
- Cinematography: Jean Penzer
- Edited by: Françoise Javet
- Music by: Georges Delerue
- Production companies: Fildebroc; Les Productions Artistes Associés; Produzioni Associate Delphos; Produzioni Europee Associate
- Distributed by: Les Artistes Associés
- Release date: 7 February 1969
- Running time: 90 minutes
- Countries: France; Italy
- Language: French

The Devil by the Tail (French: Le diable par la queue) is a 1969 French-Italian comedy film directed by Philippe de Broca and starring Yves Montand, Madeleine Renaud and Maria Schell. The French title refers to the idiom "Tirer le diable par la queue", meaning struggling to make ends meet.

== Synopsis ==
An impoverished aristocratic family living in a crumbling old 17th-century château decide to draw in unsuspecting travellers as paying guests, in collusion with Charlie, the village garage man, who is in love with Amélie, the granddaughter of the châtelaine. The man of the house is exhausted by everything, but the four women, grandmother, her daughter, granddaughter Amélie and a cousin who plays the piano and dreams of a gossamer romance are ready to save the family mansion.

One night a seductive gangster and his two accomplices arrive, in possession of 100 million francs, the proceeds of a hold-up kept in his suitcase. The noble family intend to ensure that the opportunity to get their hands on this loot should not be missed, while the gangster may not be in such a hurry to be on this way. Although the family fail in their plots, the criminal 'finds' his rustic side, nurtured by the women, and the roof does get repaired, and he rediscovers his skills as master chef ("maître-queux"). The hotel thrives and all are happy.

== Cast ==
- Yves Montand as "baron" César Maricorne
- Madeleine Renaud as La marquise de Coustines
- Maria Schell as La comtesse Diane de Coustines
- Jean Rochefort as Le comte Georges de Coustines
- Clotilde Joano as La comtesse Jeanne
- Claude Piéplu as Monsieur Patin
- Jean-Pierre Marielle as Jean-Jacques Leroy-Martin, le "play-boy"
- Tanya Lopert as Cookie
- Marthe Keller as Amélie
- Xavier Gélin as Charlie
- Jacques Balutin as Max, a gangster
- Pierre Tornade as Schwartz, a gangster
- Jeanne Berdin as Madame Passereau
- Charles Mallet as the police commissaire
- Philippe de Broca as one of the Swedish tourists

== Background ==
Filming took place from 25 June to 13 August 1968, using the Château de Fléchères in Ain, near Villefranche-sur-Saône.

The film has been described as luminous and full of the joys of being alive, with "some passages worthy of Lubitsch as to the scope of the allusions, the level of mastery of double-meanings, ...the film bathes in an atmosphere of calmly uninhibited pleasure". de Broca's predilection for contrasing dreamy characters is represented here by the pianist Jeanne, while the comedy is counterbalanced by editorial writer Patin whose negative diatribes conceal a man disappointed in love.

There are several themes in Delerue's score, the "Jeanne's theme" is serene and melancolic, while "César's theme" is more dance like, and adapted for the comic church scene. These excerpts from the score were issued on an EP.

== Bibliography ==
- Monaco, James. The Encyclopedia of Film. Perigee Books, 1991.
