= Jupiter's Thigh =

- Directed by: Philippe de Broca
- Written by: Philippe de Broca; Michel Audiard
- Produced by: Robert Amon; Georges Dancigers; Alexandre Mnouchkine
- Starring: Annie Girardot; Philippe Noiret
- Cinematography: Jean-Paul Schwartz
- Edited by: Henri Lanoë
- Music by: George Hatzinassios
- Distributed by: Compagnie Franco-Coloniale Cinématographique (CFCC)
- Release date: 1980
- Running time: 100 minutes
- Country: France
- Language: French

On a volé la cuisse de Jupiter (literally Jupiter's thigh was stolen) is a 1980 French movie], starring Annie Girardot and Philippe Noiret, and directed by Philippe de Broca. It is the sequel to the 1978 crime film Tendre Poulet in which both Girardot and Noiret reprise their roles as Lise Tanquerelle and Antoine Lemercier respectively.

== Cast ==
- Annie Girardot : Lise Tanquerelle
- Philippe Noiret : Antoine Lemercier
- Francis Perrin : Charles-Hubert Pochet
- Catherine Alric : Agnès Pochet
- Marc Dudicourt : Spiratos
- Paulette Dubost : Lise's mother
- Roger Carel : Sacharias
