= Le Magnifique =

- Directed by: Philippe de Broca
- Written by: Philippe de Broca; Francis Veber; Jean-Paul Rappeneau
- Produced by: Georges Dancigers; Alexandre Mnouchkine
- Starring: Jean-Paul Belmondo; Jacqueline Bisset
- Cinematography: René Mathelin
- Music by: Claude Bolling
- Distributed by: C.C.F.C.
- Release date: 29 November 1973
- Running time: 95 minutes
- Countries: France; Italy
- Language: French
- Box office: 2,895,800 admissions (France)

Le Magnifique (literally The Magnificent One; also known as The Man from Acapulco) is a 1973 French-Italian spy comedy film starring Jean-Paul Belmondo, Jacqueline Bisset and Vittorio Caprioli that was directed by Philippe de Broca. Le Magnifique is a slapstick spoof of B-series spy films and novels and the men who write them.

In the film, a financially struggling writer of spy novels imagines himself as an idealised superspy. In his imagination, he casts his female neighbor as the spy's paramour, and his publisher as an Albanian villain. The imagination is soon reflected in the formation of a love triangle in the writer's life.

== Synopsis ==
François Merlin is a Jean Bruce type writer of pulp espionage novels (he has written 42 so far) and about half of the film plays in his imagination, where he is the world-renowned superspy Bob Sinclar. (The name of the character is never seen written in the film. While some people write his name "Saint-Clair", the way it is pronounced in French sounds like Sinclar; in the English dubbed soundtrack the surname is "St. Cloud".)

Christine is a sociology student who lives in François' building and is interested in the novels, but in the writer's imagination she becomes Tatiana, his paramour. The pompous and rich publisher of his novels, Pierre Charron, doubles as the great villain of the spy novels, the Albanian secret service's head Karpov, who in a memorable scene of the film threatens to cut off one of Tatiana's breasts.

Christine is clearly fascinated with the handsome spy Bob Sinclar, an unrealistic and idealised hero, who is the very opposite of his creator: a clumsy, frustrated divorced man who barely makes enough money to get by. However, when she is befriended by the rich and vain publisher who looks down upon his poor hack writer, she realises her mistake, and after a party where he tries to seduce her, she flees him and falls asleep on the landing outside the writer's flat, where he finds her in the morning, clad apparently only in a T-shirt and embraces her for a happy ending. In the final scene, François throws over the balcony his last manuscript, freeing himself from his character and his imaginary life.

== Production ==
Due to a dispute between Francis Veber and director Philippe de Broca over the importance of the lead female character to the script, Francis Veber refused to be credited as a writer. As a result, the credits don't feature any writer.

== UK Release ==
In the United Kingdom, Le Magnifique was titled How to Destroy the Reputation of the Greatest Secret Agent, and was released as the B-Movie to the film Doc Savage: The Man of Bronze in 1975.

== Cast ==
- Jean-Paul Belmondo : François Merlin / Bob Saint-Clar
- Jacqueline Bisset : Christine / Tatiana
- Vittorio Caprioli : Georges Charron / Colonel Karpof
- Monique Tarbès : Mrs. Berger
- Mario David (actor) : Policeman
- Raymond Gérôme : General Pontaubert
- Jean Lefebvre : The electrician
- Hans Meyer : Colonel Collins
- André Weber : The plumber
- Hubert Deschamps : Salesman
- Bernard Musson : Interpreter
- Louis Navarre (actor) : Interpreter
- Jean-Pierre Rambal : The Lecturer
- Gaëtan Noël : Doctor
