= René Duchez =

René Duchez (born in 1903, died in 1948) was a French painter and decorating subcontractor in World War II who stole a set of plans which showed the defenses of Hitler's Atlantic Wall.

== Biography ==
René Duchez was a member of the Caen group of the "Centurie" network, which was itself a branch of the OCM (Organisation Civile et Militaire) resistance movement, created in 1940. The "Centurie" network acted as an intelligence service, and covered nearly the whole of France; its local head was Marcel Girard, who was responsible for Normandy and the western regions of occupied France.

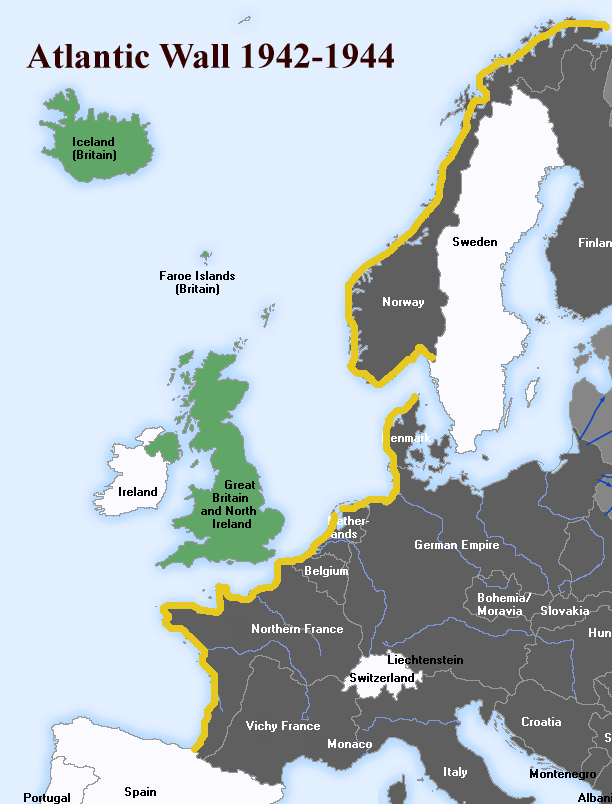
The Atlantic Wall during the Second World War

The Caen group was composed of about forty people. In 1942, the Germans started building the Atlantic Wall, and after the failed Dieppe landing in August, London asked the network to obtain information about ways the Wall could be crossed. The group collected many information items, namely about the gateways and the chicanes. René Duchez was a member of the group, and his wife forged papers that allowed the resistants to come near the works. In order to be at close quarters with the Germans, he applied for a painting job at the kommandantur, obtained it, and managed to steal a map of the Cotentin region while showing wallpaper samples. He hid it behind a mirror, and came back later to retrieve it under the pretext of carrying on with the painting job.

The stolen document indicated very accurately the position of all the defenses, shelters, underwater obstacles, beach barriers, passages, phony mine fields, etc. It was taken to London with a fishing boat by colonel Rémy, and tossed on the MI-6 office desk. MI-6 feared it would be useless because German engineers would change the constructions when the loss was discovered. However the decision was to make a copy and not mention the fact. The plan eventually helped preparing the landing in Normandy. Meanwhile, the Caen group went on gathering information : more than 3,000 documents were sent to London, all dealing with the Atlantic Wall.

René Duchez and his wife were eventually found out by the Gestapo. René managed to escape, pretending to be a displeased customer who happened to be at Duchez's home. His wife was arrested, questioned to no avail, and deported to Ravensbrück. She came back after the war, and died in 2005. René carried on his action, and organized resistance movements in Normandy, but more than half the members of the national network were shot or died in concentration camps.

== Portrayed in film ==
The story of René Duchez was (very) freely adapted by Marcel Camus in his Franco-Italian motion picture Le Mur de l'Atlantique ("The Atlantic Wall"), produced by Société Nouvelle de Cinématographie (SNC), released on 10 October 1970, and featuring such actors as Bourvil, Peter McEnery, Sophie Desmarets, Jean Poiret, Reinhard Kolldehoff, Sara Franchetti, Pino Caruso, Terry-Thomas, Roland Lesaffre et Jacques Balutin. In this film (a light comedy), it is by mistake that the clumsy painter (dubbed Léon Duchemin, and played by Bourvil) rolls up the famous map with his wallpaper samples, which sends him onto an endless sea of troubles. The making of the film was suggested by Colonel Rémy himself.

== Homage ==
Around 1995, a street in Caen (France) was named after René Duchez, not far from rue Colonel Rémy, in a district close to the Mémorial pour la Paix museum, where a majority of streets commemorate personalities linked with the Second World War, the Résistance, and the subsequent making of the European Community.
