= Get Out Your Handkerchiefs =

1978 film by Bertrand Blier

- French film poster
- Préparez vos mouchoirs
- Directed by: Bertrand Blier
- Written by: Bertrand Blier
- Produced by: Paul Claudon; Georges Dancigers; Alexandre Mnouchkine
- Starring: Gérard Depardieu; Patrick Dewaere; Carole Laure
- Cinematography: Jean Penzer
- Edited by: Claudine Merlin
- Music by: Georges Delerue
- Distributed by: Compagnie Commerciale Française Cinématographique
- Release date: 11 January 1978
- Running time: 105 minutes
- Country: France
- Language: French
- Box office: $2,086,000

Get Out Your Handkerchiefs (French: Préparez vos mouchoirs) is a 1978 French comedy film directed by Bertrand Blier and starring Carole Laure, Gérard Depardieu, Patrick Dewaere and Riton Liebman. The film won the Academy Award for Best Foreign Language Film at the 51st Academy Awards. Critic Arion Berger called it "a romantic comedy that bears no resemblance to romantic comedy as a genre".

The film tells the story of a ménage à trois in which two men share a woman to cure her of an unexplained depression, with many symptoms. Eventually, she begins an affair with an underage boy. The film employs heavy references to historical musician Wolfgang Amadeus Mozart, combined with the music of the film's composer Georges Delerue, who won the César Award for Best Original Music. Get Out Your Handkerchiefs was a critical success.

== Plot ==
Raoul and his wife Solange are eating in a restaurant when Raoul expresses concern with Solange's apparent depression, as she eats little, suffers migraines and insomnia, and also sometimes faints. He finds another man in the room, Stéphane, to be her lover and hopefully enliven her. Stéphane is puzzled by Raoul's plan, but gives in to his desperate appeals for help. The two men take turns sleeping with Solange, and both try to impregnate her without success, believing a lack of a child to be the source of her depression. Stéphane also shares his love for the music of Mozart and Pocket Books with the two and their neighbourhood grocer. The music inspires the men, but not Solange.

Raoul, Solange, and Stéphane work at a boys' camp in the summer, where they meet a 13-year-old math prodigy named Christian Belœil, who is bullied by the other boys. Solange becomes protective of Christian and one night lets him sleep in her bed. She awakes to find Christian exploring her body and scolds him. They make up and have sex, despite the drastic age difference. Afterwards, Solange becomes dependent on the boy, to the point where Raoul, Stéphane, and she kidnap him from his boarding school. Christian eventually impregnates her, and the film ends with Raoul and Stéphane walking away after serving six months in prison.

== Cast ==
- Gérard Depardieu as Raoul
- Patrick Dewaere as Stéphane
- Carole Laure as Solange
- Michel Serrault as the neighbour
- Eléonore Hirt as Madame Belœil
- Jean Rougerie as Monsieur Belœil
- Sylvie Joly as the passer-by
- Riton Liebman as Christian Belœil
- Liliane Rovère as Marthe the barmaid ("Bernadette")
- Michel Beaune as the doctor in the street
- Gilberte Géniat as the usherette

== Production ==
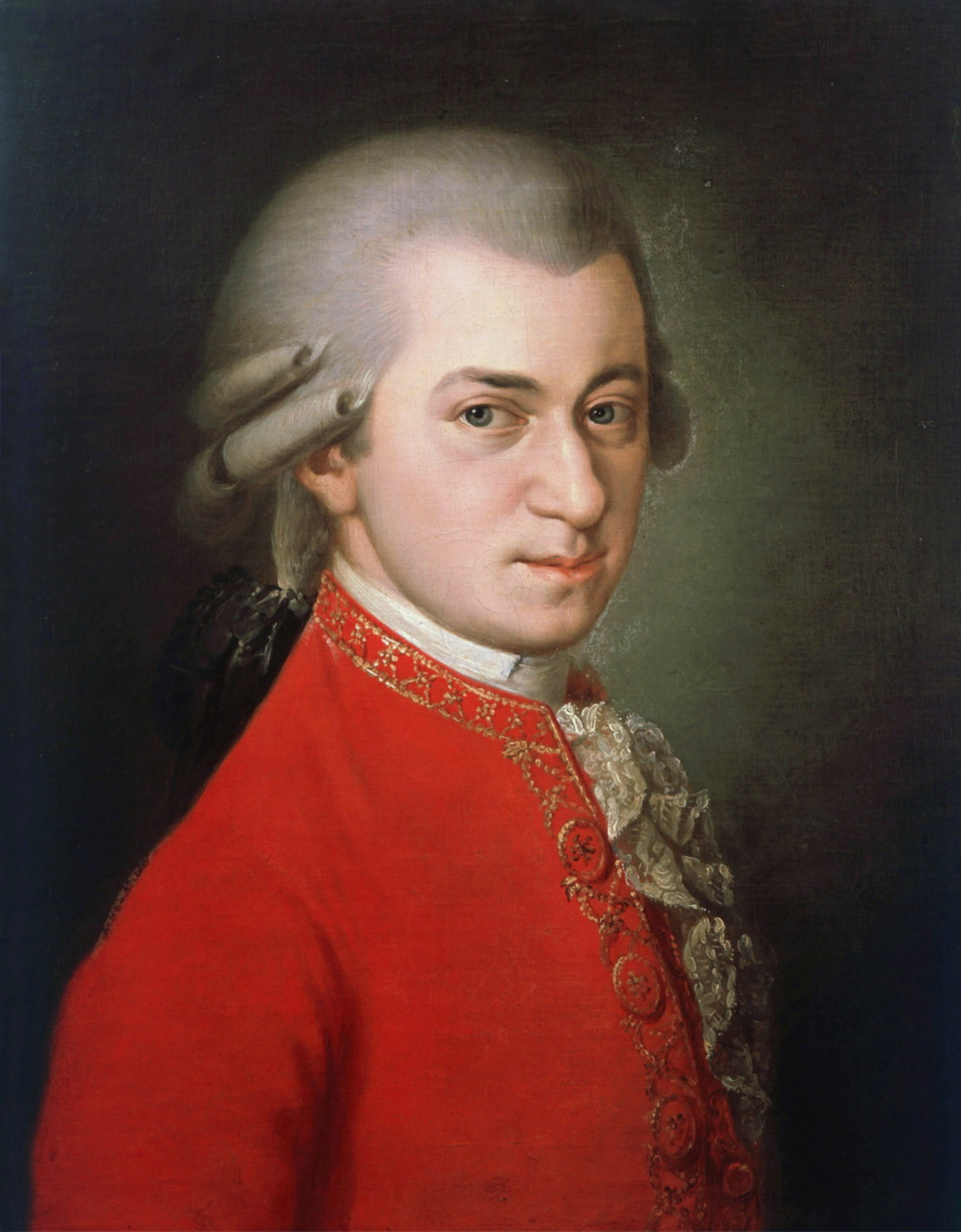
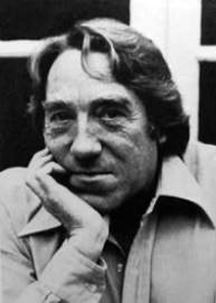
The screenplay began with an imaginary meeting with composer Wolfgang Amadeus Mozart, whose music was combined with that of Georges Delerue, who won the César Award for Best Original Music.

Director Bertrand Blier wrote the screenplay "from the middle", starting by writing the scene where Raoul and Stéphane fantasize about meeting Mozart. Blier considered using an actor to portray Mozart in a historically-appropriate costume for the scene. Collaborating with the film's composer Georges Delerue, Blier employed Mozart's string chamber music in scenes such as where Stéphane and Solange are first seen in bed, followed by using Mozart's G minor string quintet when Raoul is in the bar with Bernadette. Mention of a conductor named Gervase de Brumer is a reference to Gervase de Peyer.

While writing the script, Blier planned to use actors Gérard Depardieu and Patrick Dewaere as the leads, having previously worked with them on Going Places (1974). The familiarity meant the men were comfortable together. Blier discovered Riton Liebman, who was 13 years old at the time, and cast him as Christian in the film, where he is credited simply as Riton. While Liebman said he had strained relations with Depardieu and Dewaere, Blier defended him during filming.

In reference to the scene where Carole Laure undresses in front of the kid, Bertrand Blier said: "We were shooting take after take without ever being satisfied. We had the impression that the scene was obscene, vulgar. Everyone was unhappy, from the actors to the stagehands. And then suddenly, on the ninth take, the miracle: a collective relief, the certainty that this time 'it would work'. It was this take that was obviously chosen and it is true that it has a certain grace..."

== Release ==
The film had a total of 1,321,087 admissions in France. It played at the New York Film Festival, where the audience clapped and hissed at the film.

It was a success in the United States, considered a surprise given the taboo subject matter of a woman in a relationship with a minor. Texas Monthly writer George Morris reported it was the most discussed film of the New York festival, because of the perceived sexist portrayal of Carole Laure as a "sex object," expressing surprise the controversy was not in relation to sex with a minor.

== Reception ==
=== Critical reception ===
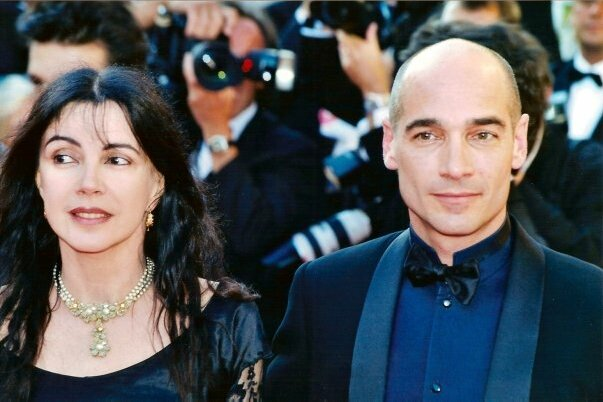
Critics discussed how the film sexually objectified or eroticized French Canadian actress Carole Laure.

Get Out Your Handkerchiefs received generally positive reviews in the United States, with some concerns about sexism. David Denby, writing for New York magazine, praised Get Out Your Handkerchiefs as "courageous and enjoyable" and made in the spirit of the French New Wave. Richard Fuller, writing for Cincinnati, gave it three and a half stars and said it was "a joy to spend time with," though he objected to Mozart's music being overly loud. Variety wrote that "a rather bizarre mixture of gritty comedy, satire and delving into female status makes this a literary film. There is a lot of talk, sometimes good, but often edgy and too often pointless in lieu of a more robust visual dynamism and life." People wrote the humour could be "downright incomprehensible" and "so airy it floats right off the screen."

Time Out called it "an erratic, often hilarious movie." In his 2002 Movie & Video Guide, Leonard Maltin gives the film three and a half stars and calls it "disarming" and "highly unconventional." Arion Berger writes that "to experience Get Out Your Handkerchiefs is to watch a master at the peak of his powers." According to Take One's Essential Guide to Canadian Film, French Canadian actress Carole Laure was "permanently eroticized" by Get Out Your Handkerchiefs and her music career, as having "reinvented the screen goddess." An Epinions critic wrote "Get Out Your Handkerchiefs is good for some laughs while flaunting somewhat outrageous disregard for standard sexual mores."

Get Out Your Handkerchiefs has an approval rating of 83% on review aggregator website Rotten Tomatoes, based on 18 reviews, and an average rating of 7.4/10.

=== Accolades ===
The film won the Academy Award for Best Foreign Language Film. After four ballots, the National Society of Film Critics named it the Best Film of 1978, with it also picking up 25 points for Best Screenplay. The Best Film honour was considered a surprise, with People objecting the award was "downright incomprehensible."

The New York Times placed the film on its Best 1000 Movies Ever list.

| Award | Date of ceremony | Category | Recipient(s) | Result | Ref(s) |
|---|---|---|---|---|---|
| Academy Awards | 9 April 1979 | Best Foreign Language Film | France | Won | |
| César Awards | 3 February 1979 | Best Original Music | Georges Delerue | Won | |
| Golden Globes | 27 January 1979 | Best Foreign Language Film | Bertrand Blier | Nominated | |
| National Society of Film Critics | 4 January 1979 | Best Film | | Won | |
| New York Film Critics Circle | 28 January 1979 | Best Director | Bertrand Blier | 5th Place | |
| New York Film Critics Circle | 28 January 1979 | Best Screenplay | Bertrand Blier | Runner-up | |
| New York Film Critics Circle | 28 January 1979 | Best Foreign Language Film | | 4th Place | |

== See also ==
- List of submissions to the 51st Academy Awards for Best Foreign Language Film
- List of French submissions for the Academy Award for Best Foreign Language Film
