= Pierre Repp =

French humorist and actor

Pierre Repp (5 November 1909 in Saint-Pol-sur-Ternoise, France – 1 November 1986 in Plessis-Trévise, France) was a French humorist and actor. His real name was Pierre Alphonse Léon Frédéric Bouclet. On 14 August 1930, he married Ferdinande Alice Andrée Bouclet in Lille.

He is famous in France for his unique comic talent. He used to simulate stuttering while talking, in a humoristic way, trying to pronounce some words and finally replacing them by others. In a famous French sketch, "Les crêpes", he explained the recipe that way, with sentences like this one: "Then you add some mamerlade, oh sorry ! Some marlamade... Uh! Me, I pour some chocolate".

Pierre Repp appeared in many theatre plays and TV shows, but mainly in music-hall and cabarets in Paris or on tour. Pierre Repp has his place in the French cinéma story due to many "third-roles" in about forty films.

== Filmography ==
- Une Femme au volant (1933, directed by Kurt Gerron and Pierre Billon)
- La merveilleuse tragédie de Lourdes (1933, directed by Henri Fabert)
- M'sieur la Caille (1955, directed by André Pergament) - The marquis
- Bonjour sourire (1956, directed by Claude Sautet)
- Women's Club (Club of Women) (1956, directed by Ralph Habib) - The usher
- Le colonel est de la revue (1957, directed by Maurice Labro)
- Printemps à Paris (1957, directed by Jean-Claude Roy)
- Nuit blanche et rouge à lèvres (1957, directed by Robert Vernay) - Prince Yucca's secretary
- Brigade des mœurs (1959, directed by Maurice Boutel)
- Les quatre cents coups (The 400 Blows) (1959, directed by François Truffaut) - The English teacher
- Les jeux de l'amour (The Games of Love) (1960, directed by Philippe de Broca) - The car driver
- Crésus (Croesus) (1960, directed by Jean Giono) - The bank clerk
- Candide ou l'optimisme au XXe siècle (1960, directed by Norbert Carbonnaux) - Le pasteur (uncredited)
- Le bouclier (1960, Short film about security, directed by Georges Rouquier) - L'ouvrier bègue
- L'amant de cinq jours (Five Day Lover) (1961, directed by Philippe de Broca) - Pépère
- Le Tracassin ou les plaisirs de la ville (The Busybody) (1961, directed by Alex Joffé) - The strawberries taster
- Cartouche (Swords of Blood) (1962, directed by Philippe de Broca) - Marquis de Griffe
- Les Petits Matins / Mademoiselle Stop (Hitch-Hike) (1962, directed by Jacqueline Audry) - The sex maniac
- Un clair de lune à Maubeuge (Moonlight in Maubeuge) (1962, directed by Jean Chérasse) - Le secrétaire bègue
- Césarin joue les étroits mousquetaires (1962, directed by Émile Couzinet) - Césarin
- Un roi sans divertissement (A King Without Distraction) (1963, directed by François Leterrier) - Ravanel
- La bande à Bobo (1963, directed by Tony Saytor) - Spiguy
- Humour noir (Black Humor) (1965, directed by Claude Autant-Lara) (segment 1 'La Bestiole')
- Fifi la plume (1965, directed by Albert Lamorisse) - Le commissaire
- The Duke's Gold (1965, directed by Jacques Baratier and Bernard Toublanc-Michel) - The textile saler
- Le tatoué (The Tattooed One) (1968, directed by Denys de La Patellière) - Countryman with beef (uncredited)
- Sous le signe de Monte-Cristo (The Return of Monte Cristo) (1968, directed by André Hunebelle) - Jauffrey
- Peau d'Âne (Donkey Skin) (1970, directed by Jacques Demy) - Thibaud
- L'explosion (The Hideout) (1971, directed by Marc Simenon - 1971) - Dubois
- La Grande mafia (La Grande Maffia) (1971, directed by Philippe Clair) - The Prime Minister
- Je sais rien, mais je dirai tout (Don't Know Anything But I'll Tell All) (1973, directed by Pierre Richard) - Bernier, le sous-directeur
- Cours après moi que je t'attrape (Run After Me Until I Catch You) (1976, directed by Robert Pouret) - The taxi driver
- Le Gendarme et les extra-terrestres (The Gendarme and the Creatures from Outer Space) (1979, directed by Jean Girault) - The garage mechanic
- Les Givrés (1979, directed by Alain Jaspard) - The ski lift clerk
- Charles et Lucie (1979, directed by Nelly Kaplan) - The bus driver
- Le Gendarme et les gendarmettes (Never Play Clever Again) (1982, directed by Jean Girault) - The stuttering complainant
- Prends ton passe-montagne, on va à la plage (1983, directed by Eddy Matalon) - Le client du garage
- Le téléphone sonne toujours deux fois!! (The Telephone Always Rings Twice) (1985, directed by Jean-Pierre Vergne) - A witness (final film role)
