= Five Day Lover =

1961 film

- Directed by: Philippe de Broca
- Written by: Philippe de Broca; Daniel Boulanger; Françoise Parturier
- Produced by: Georges Dancigers
- Starring: Jean Seberg; Micheline Presle; Jean-Pierre Cassel
- Cinematography: Jean Penzer
- Edited by: Laurence Méry-Clark
- Music by: Georges Delerue
- Distributed by: Cinédis
- Release date: 24 February 1961
- Running time: 95 minutes
- Countries: France; Italy
- Language: French

Five Day Lover (French: L'Amant de cinq jours) is a 1961 French sex comedy film directed and co-written by Philippe de Broca, starring Jean Seberg and Micheline Presle. It is based on the 1959 novel L'amant de cinq jours by Françoise Parturier. The film was entered into the 11th Berlin International Film Festival and nominated for the Golden Bear.

== Plot ==
Claire (Jean Seberg), a young Englishwoman, lives in Paris with her staid husband, Georges (François Périer), a government archivist, and their two small children. One day, while attending a fashion show mounted by her friend Madeleine (Micheline Presle), a couturière, Claire meets a lighthearted young Frenchman, Antoine (Jean-Pierre Cassel). Despite the fact that he is being kept by Madeleine, Claire responds to his advances and returns with him to his luxurious bachelor apartment. Before long she is visiting him five afternoons a week; evenings and weekends are reserved for Georges and the children. Madeleine, strong-willed and possessive, learns of the affair and decides to meet the situation directly by inviting Claire and Georges, as well as Antoine, to the same party. The desired effect is achieved when it becomes apparent that Claire is tiring of Antoine and has no intention of seeing him again. Only Georges, quiet and gentle, understands that nothing has really changed. It will not be long before Claire will once more embark on her quest for chance lovers.

== Cast ==
- Jean Seberg as Claire
- Micheline Presle as Madeleine
- Jean-Pierre Cassel as Antoine
- François Périer as Georges
- Carlo Croccolo as Marius
- Claude Mansard as Une invité
- Albert Michel as Blanchet
- Albert Mouton as Halavoine
- Marcella Rovena as Madame Chanut
- Sylvain as Le maître (as Jean Sylvain)
- Pierre Repp as Pepere
- Gib Grossac as Taxiste

== Filming locations ==
The film was shot in Paris, France, partly in Grand Trianon.

== Awards ==
The film was entered into the 11th Berlin International Film Festival and nominated for the Golden Bear, the ceremony's highest honor. It lost the prize to Michelangelo Antonioni's La Notte.
