= Incorrigible (1975 film) =

L'Incorrigible
- Directed by: Philippe de Broca
- Written by: Michel Audiard
- Based on: A novel by Alex Varoux
- Produced by: Alexandre Mnouchkine; Georges Dancigers
- Starring: Jean-Paul Belmondo
- Cinematography: Jean Penzer
- Edited by: Francoise Javet
- Music by: Georges Delerue
- Distributed by: C.C.F.C
- Release date: 1975 (France)
- Running time: 100 minutes
- Country: France
- Box office: $19.3 million

Incorrigible (French: L'Incorrigible) is a 1975 French comedy film directed by Philippe de Broca and starring Jean-Paul Belmondo, Geneviève Bujold and Capucine.

== Plot ==
Victor Vauthier, a lovable rogue and mythomaniac who does not want to give up his ways, leaves prison, causing great sadness to his guards, who had come to like him during his three-month imprisonment. He immediately pulls off a series of thefts and frauds. Meanwhile, he has to report to his parole officer, Marie-Charlotte Pontalec. Victor and Marie-Charlotte immediately hit it off. This does not prevent Victor, encouraged by his father figure, uncle Camille, from trying to profit from his proximity to Marie-Charlotte in order to steal a triptych by El Greco. The picture is located in the Senlis Museum, where Marie-Charlotte's father works as a custodian. However, she ends up figuring out Victor's plan.

== Main cast ==
- Jean-Paul Belmondo as Victor Vauthier
- Geneviève Bujold as Marie-Charlotte Pontalec
- Julien Guiomar as Camille
- Charles Gérard as Raoul
- Daniel Ceccaldi as Chief of Police
- Capucine as Hélène
- Andréa Ferréol as Tatiana Negulesco
- Michel Beaune as Minister
- Albert Simono as Monsieur Pontalec
- Pascale Roberts as Adrienne
- Maria Meriko as Madame Florinda
- Dora Doll as Thérèse, barkeep
- Anémone as Prostitute
- Marc Dudicourt as Ministry Guard
- Roger Riffard as Second Taxi Driver
- Maurice Travail as Finances Official

== Discography ==
The soundtrack was composed by Georges Delerue, and made available on CD by Music Box Records.
