= Mnouchkine =

Mnouchkine may refer to:

- Alexandre Mnouchkine (1908–1993), French film producer
- Ariane Mnouchkine (born 1939), French stage director
