= The Married Couple of the Year Two =

1971 film

- Film poster
- Directed by: Jean-Paul Rappeneau
- Written by: Daniel Boulanger; Maurice Clavel; Jean-Paul Rappeneau; Claude Sautet
- Produced by: Alain Poiré
- Starring: Jean-Paul Belmondo; Marlène Jobert
- Cinematography: Claude Renoir
- Edited by: Pierre Gillette
- Music by: Michel Legrand
- Production companies: Gaumont; Rizzoli Film; Studioul Cinematografic Bucuresti
- Distributed by: Gaumont Distribution
- Release date: 7 April 1971
- Running time: 98 minutes
- Countries: France; Italy; Romania
- Language: French
- Box office: 2.8 million admissions (France)

The Married Couple of the Year Two (French: Les Mariés de l'an Deux) is a 1971 French adventure comedy film directed by Jean-Paul Rappeneau, and starring Jean-Paul Belmondo and Marlène Jobert. Set in 1793, it tells the story of a man who returns to France after years abroad to get a formal divorce from his estranged wife, only to find himself caught up in the turmoil of the Revolution. It is also known under the English-language titles The Scoundrel and The Swashbuckler.

"Year Two" (of the Republic) refers to the Republican calendar. More specifically, the title refers to the "Soldiers of Year II", the conscripts raised by the 1793 mass levy to defend the French First Republic against foreign invaders.

A combination of historical satire and swashbuckling action scenes, the film also pays homage to Golden Age Hollywood comedies, including screwball and remarriage films. (Note: At the time of the film's release, divorce was already authorized in France, but mutual consent divorce—which made it considerably easier—had not yet been introduced.) The film was entered into the 1971 Cannes Film Festival. It was a box-office hit in France, where it also earned critical praise.

== Plot ==
In 1793, Nicolas Philibert, a Frenchman who has been living for several years in the United States, is set to marry a plantation owner's daughter. However, the wedding is halted by the revelation that Nicolas already has a wife in France. His bride's father then orders him back to France to secure a divorce, as the new French Republic legalized it; Nicolas is also tasked with transporting wheat.

Nicolas and his wife, Charlotte, had been childhood sweethearts; a Gypsy woman had prophesied that Charlotte would become a princess, whereas Nicolas would find fortune in a new world. Charlotte, eager to see the prophecy come true, later allowed herself to be courted by nobles; Nicolas ended up killing a baron who took his flirting too far, which forced him to flee France.

Nicolas lands at Nantes, finding a country in chaos: the Reign of Terror is raging and the area is swept by a Royalist insurgency. While unconcerned with politics, Nicolas is immediately caught up in the absurd workings of the new regime: even though the locals are starving, the paranoid "People's Representative" declares Nicolas's wheat to be poisoned, and has him arrested.

Having managed to escape, Nicolas searches for Charlotte; he is told by her father that she eloped with Henri de Guérande, a leader of the Chouan insurgents. Nicolas finds Pauline, Henri's sister; mistaken for a Republican spy, he narrowly avoids being killed by her Royalist friends.

His wheat having been deemed safe, Nicolas is hailed as a hero by Revolutionary authorities. He is next brought along by officials to a Cult of Reason ceremony; the hymn singer turns out to be Pauline, who then tries to assassinate the Representative. Pauline's gun jams, and Nicolas prevents her from being killed. Pauline flees; Nicolas is rearrested, and hastily sentenced to death in a show trial.

Nicolas escapes again, taking along his cellmate, a veteran Revolutionary imprisoned by his own. They later fall into a Chouan ambush led by Pauline. Nicolas is spared while his cellmate is shot; Pauline then takes him to the castle from where her brother leads the insurgency. There, Nicolas is reunited with Charlotte, who is Henri's mistress, claiming to be a widow.

An Émigré prince arrives from London to oversee the insurgency; he looks down upon the younger Henri, and soon becomes smitten with Charlotte. Henri then announces that he will marry Charlotte, causing conflict with the prince. To spite her brother, Pauline announces that she will marry her savior, Nicolas; this, in turn, outrages another Royalist, Saint-Aubin, who is besotted with Pauline. The infighting escalates into a series of brawls and chases, with Nicolas dueling with Saint-Aubin and grappling with Henri, until he and Charlotte escape together on horseback.

Nicolas and Charlotte take refuge in a tree. They become reacquainted but soon start bickering again, with Charlotte outraged that Nicolas returned to France just to divorce her. The prince's carriage then drives by; Charlotte asks him to take her along. Delighted at the prospect of marrying Charlotte, the prince has Nicolas drugged, bringing him, semi-comatose, to the Hôtel de Ville to sign divorce papers. Nantes is in turmoil, an insurrection having broken out against the Representative; in the confusion, Charlotte and the prince manage to have the divorce papers signed, then flee after the prince is recognized.

Nicolas wakes up on board his boat. He is momentarily resigned to the prophecy coming true; Charlotte will marry the prince, while he returns to America. However, the wind blows the divorce decree overboard. Nicolas then swims ashore.

Charlotte and the prince are bound for the Émigrés headquarters in Germany. Pursuing them across France in the throes of the Austrian invasion, Nicolas catches up with Charlotte at the frontier. The prince's carriage crosses enemy lines, but Charlotte decides to run back to France, where Nicolas joins the National Volunteers in the Revolutionary counterattack.

An epilogue shows Nicolas and Charlotte years later, still married and squabbling, with Nicolas elevated to Marshal of France and prince of the Empire. Charlotte has indeed become a princess while Nicolas found fortune in a "new" world, thus fulfilling the prophecy.

== Cast ==
- Jean-Paul Belmondo as Nicolas Philibert
- Marlène Jobert as Charlotte Philibert, née Gosselin
- Laura Antonelli (Note: Dubbed into French by Michèle Montel.) as Pauline de Guérande
- Michel Auclair as the prince
- Sami Frey as Marquis Henri de Guérande
- Julien Guiomar as the People's Representative
- Mario David as Requiem
- Charles Denner as Nicolas's travel companion
- Georges Beller as Simon, a National Guard soldier
- Patrick Préjean as Count de Saint-Aubin
- Pierre Brasseur as Gosselin, Charlotte's father
- Sim as Lucas, Gosselin's employee
- Paul Crauchet as the public prosecutor
- Marc Dudicourt as Nicolas's cellmate
- Billy Kearns as Mr. Davison, Nicolas's father-in-law-to-be
- Vernon Dobtcheff as the American pastor
- Monique Garnier as the Gypsy woman
- Maurice Barrier as a Revolutionary official
- Julieta Szönyi as Nicolas's bride
- Jacques Legras as the divorce clerk
- Patrick Dewaere as a National Volunteer soldier
- Henri Guybet as a sans-culotte
- Jean-Pierre Marielle as the narrator (voice only)

== Production ==
=== Development ===
Director Jean-Paul Rappeneau started working on The Married Couple of the Year Two after the success of his first film, A Matter of Resistance (La Vie de Château) gave him the opportunity to direct a higher-budget production. Like the director's first film, the initial idea for this new project was a romantic comedy set against a historical backdrop; the director envisioned a period adventure comedy with spectacular action scenes, featuring a protagonist caught up in the chaos of the French Revolution. He eventually found the starting point for the story upon seeing a period engraving that showed people queuing to fill out their applications for divorce after the French Republic authorized it. Rappeneau wrote the original draft for the script, later reworking it with Claude Sautet, and authors Maurice Clavel and Daniel Boulanger. The director, who envisioned the film as a "French-style Western", was strongly influenced by American film classics; he sought to blend the epic scale of Anthony Mann's Western and adventure films with the humorous timing of Ernst Lubitsch's comedies.

The film was conceived from the start as a star vehicle for Jean-Paul Belmondo. One of France's leading film stars at the time, the actor had found his greatest success in action and adventure films, often tinged with humor. Casting the female lead, however, proved more difficult; Rappeneau had in mind Catherine Deneuve, who had starred in A Matter of Resistance, but she was unavailable at the time. Rappeneau then considered Julie Christie, having met the British actress and discovered that she was fluent in French. However, upon meeting the filmmakers after being pitched the project, Christie brought along her then-boyfriend, Warren Beatty. According to Rappeneau's account, Beatty expressed his interest for the project and said he could help expand it into a Hollywood picture, which would have involved shooting in English. Rappeneau then understood that Beatty was conditioning Christie's casting to his own as the male protagonist. While he considered the opportunity to start a Hollywood career, Rappeneau ultimately decided to pass on the idea out of loyalty to Belmondo.

The project was initially developed by producer Alexandre Mnouchkine, who had helmed several of Belmondo's previous films. However, Mnouchkine eventually withdrew after budget estimates proved too high; the project was then picked up by Alain Poiré of Gaumont. To reduce production costs, Poiré opted to shoot in Romania. At the time, the Romanian communist regime headed by Nicolae Ceaușescu was considered more moderate than other Eastern Bloc countries; this had led Western production companies to shoot projects there and take advantage of lower local wages. It was also Poiré who suggested casting Marlène Jobert, then a rising star of French cinema, as the female lead.

The film was co-produced by Gaumont with Italian company Rizzoli Film, and Italian actress Laura Antonelli was cast in a major role. Several performers of the Café de la Gare comedy theater applied for minor roles, including Patrick Dewaere, Henri Guybet, Gérard Depardieu and Coluche. Rappeneau cast Dewaere and Guybet, but decided against casting Coluche, while Depardieu proved unavailable; Rappeneau and Depardieu would work together two decades later, on the international box-office hit Cyrano de Bergerac.

=== Filming ===
Principal photography started on 3 August 1970. Locations in Romania included Brașov and Feldioara. Filming conditions were difficult, and hindered by cultural clashes with the Romanians. While filming took place for the most part in Romania, some scenes were shot in France, on locations that included Moret-sur-Loing, Compiègne, Châteauneuf, and Vaux-le-Vicomte.

Production eventually fell nine weeks behind schedule. To catch up, Rappeneau considered scrapping a complex action scene that involved Laura Antonelli. However, Belmondo, who began a relationship with Antonelli during production, supported her; he and the other actors went on strike on the grounds of having their contractual filming times respected, and the scene was filmed as planned. On the other hand, Belmondo had a poor working relationship with his co-star Jobert, and the two actors barely spoke when not shooting.

Rappeneau ultimately solved the scheduling issues by speeding up the filming of the scenes shot in France, and managed to get the film ready for the scheduled release date.

Sets were designed by Alexandre Trauner who, however, only produced the drawings. Due to the difficult filming conditions in Romania, the sets were managed by Willy Holt during principal photography. Michel Legrand composed the score which he conducted himself, leading an orchestra of 70 musicians.

== Reception ==
The Married Couple of the Year Two was the closing film at the 1971 Cannes Film Festival. Upon release, it was well-received by French critics, who called it a first-rate piece of entertainment. Journalist Henry Chapier praised the film for its "elegance"; Jean de Baroncelli of Le Monde found it highly enjoyable, fast-paced, and masterfully directed.The film was a box-office hit in France, where it sold over 2.8 million admissions. It also performed well at a European level, ranking 43th at the Italian box office for the 1971-72 season.

In a 2021 article summarizing Jean-Paul Belmondo's notable performances, Elisabeth Vincentelli of The New York Times called the film a "sterling example of a certain kind of period, well-made entertainment that has long been popular in France", and "a high-spirited screwball comedy of marriage". In a 2022 review, Cécile Mury of Télérama described it as thoroughly entertaining, praising the witty script and the high-energy performances of Belmondo and Jobert. A 2025 review on the website avoir-alire praised the pacing, production values, and performances, with Belmondo still in top form and not yet indulging in his later overacting; it noted, however, that the film's weak spot was Jobert's character, which suffered from stereotypical writing.

== Depiction of historical themes ==
The Married Couple of the Year Two depicts the French Revolution in a satirical manner, which has occasionally caused it to be called a "counter-revolutionary" film. When Nicolas returns to France, he travels along with another expatriate, who blithely rejoices at the ideas of Jean-Jacques Rousseau and Enlightenment coming true and, upon arriving, is instantly faced with the harsh realities of the Reign of Terror; later, Nicolas's cellmate is a former Estates General deputy who supported the Revolution from the start, taking part to the storming of the Bastille and the Declaration of Rights of Man, only to be imprisoned as a moderate. Some scenes echo the infamous mass executions by drowning in Nantes; the tyrannical and murderous "People's Representative", not named in the film, is based on Jean-Baptiste Carrier, who ruled Nantes during the Reign of Terror as envoy of the National Convention.

In a 2025 paper, French scholar Laurent Bihl noted that the film stands out among French works of fiction dealing with the period for its refusal to explicitly take sides. Even though Nicolas and Charlotte ultimately choose to support the Revolution, Nicolas remains an opportunist throughout, with his final choice apparently motivated more by his love for Charlotte than by real faith in Republican ideals. While the film is clearly critical of the abuses that took places at the time, it partially avoids tropes about the French Revolution being a reign of the scum; the French masses are shown as easily influenced, but the film also depicts them sympathetically as victims of war, famine and arbitrary government, and they ultimately prove capable of revolting against the despotic Jacobin official. Likewise, the Chouan peasants are depicted as victims of circumstances, and implied to follow their aristocratic masters more out of habit than out of genuine support for the Monarchy. Republican officials are depicted as abusive and incompetent, but the film does not support the Royalists either; the arrogant Émigré prince is an equally grotesque figure as the Republican Representative, while the relationship between Henri de Guérande and his sister Pauline is implied to be quasi-incestuous, echoing tropes about aristocratic degeneracy and inbreeding. Bihl commented that the film's clever effort to reach a "consensus" about the Revolution, by juxtaposing opposing points of view, made it a unique work in French cinema.

When Rappeneau died in 2026, the French Foundation for the Remembrance of Slavery noted in a social media post that while the film never mentioned slavery —a theme that French filmmakers were reluctant to tackle— it addressed it implicitly. Nantes, where part of the story takes place, was at the time a hub of the Atlantic slave trade; the opening scenes are set in South Carolina, then a slave state, and enslaved servants can be seen in the house of Nicolas's prospective father-in-law. However, it is never explicitly stated that Nicolas, meant to be a sympathetic protagonist, was involved in the slave trade himself.

== Home video ==
The film was released on VHS, and later reissued on DVD and Blu-Ray. It was also released on VOD on various streaming services, including Amazon Prime, Canal+, and Apple TV.
