= Louis Dominique Bourguignon =

18th-century French criminal (1693-1721)

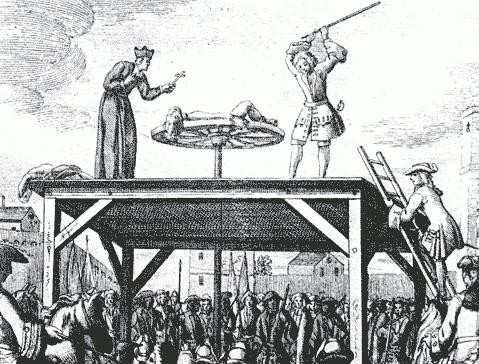
The execution of Cartouche, 1721

Louis Dominique Garthausen, also known as Cartouche (c. 1693, Paris – November 28, 1721, Paris), who usually went by the name of Louis Bourguignon or Louis Lamarre when he wanted to hide his identity, was a highwayman reported to steal from the rich and give to the poor in the environs of Paris during the Régence until the authorities had him broken on the wheel. His brother died after being hanged by the arms, which was meant to be non-fatal.

Cartouche gained a public following, with plays being written of him. The authorities were forced to shut down his plays after only thirteen performances. His crimes and daring exploits were exploited in ballads and popular prints and have been revived in bodice-rippers and the swashbuckling romance with slapstick comedy of the film Cartouche (1962) by Philippe de Broca, starring Jean Paul Belmondo and Claudia Cardinale. His brother's death was compared to Louis XVII's death in Les Misérables by a former member of the national assembly.
