= A.-M. Julien =

French actor, singer and theatre manager

A.-M. Julien, real name Aman-Julien Maistre, (24 July 1903 – 15 January 2001) was a French actor, singer and theatre manager.

He was François Maistre's father.

== Life ==
Born in Toulon (Var) on 24 July 1903, Julien joined the troupe of the Copiaus founded by Jacques Copeau in the 1920s and which became the Compagnie des Quinze (1930-1932) in 1929 when it was installed at the Théâtre du Vieux-Colombier in Paris. It is within this group that he met the Swiss actor, singer and composer Jean Villard, known as Gilles, with whom he created a vocal duo from 1932 to 1939, under the name "Gilles and Julien", which met with great success.

From 1947 to 1966, he directed the Théâtre Sarah-Bernhardt, where he founded the Festival d'Art dramatique de Paris in 1954 (renamed "Théâtre des Nations" in 1957), thanks to which he made the Parisian public discover, among others Bertolt Brecht's Berliner Ensemble and Giorgio Strehler's Piccolo Teatro di Milano.

From 1959 to 1962, he was also director of the Réunion des théâtres lyriques nationaux (RTLN), which included the Opéra Garnier and the Opéra-Comique. In this capacity, he chaired the jury of the International singing competition of Toulouse on 2 occasions.

Julien died in Millau (Aveyron) on 15 January 2001.

== Selected appearances ==
- 1935: Monsieur Sans-Gêne
- 1941: Ne bougez plus
- 1944: Le Carrefour des enfants perdus by Léo Joannon
- 1967: Au théâtre ce soir, Marcel Pagnol's Topaze, staged by Marcelle Tassencourt, directed by Pierre Sabbagh, Théâtre Marigny
- 1969: Jacquou le Croquant, miniseries by Stellio Lorenzi
