= Candide ou l'optimisme au XXe siècle =

1960 film

Candide ou l'Optimisme du XXe siècle
- Directed by: Norbert Carbonnaux
- Written by: Norbert Carbonnaux; Albert Simonin
- Produced by: CLM, Société Nouvelle Pathé (France)
- Starring: Jean-Pierre Cassel; Louis de Funès
- Music by: Hubert Rostaing
- Distributed by: Consortium Pathé
- Release date: 16 December 1960 (France)
- Running time: 88 minutes
- Country: France
- Language: French

Candide ou l'Optimisme du XXe siècle (English: Candide, or the Optimist of the Twentieth Century) is a 1960 French comedy drama film directed by Norbert Carbonnaux and written by Carbonnaux and Albert Simonin. It stars Jean-Pierre Cassel as Candide, Pierre Brasseur as Pangloss, Louis de Funès as the officer of the Gestapo, and Daliah Lavi as Cunégonde. The film was released under the titles Candide (alternative French title; USA), Candide oder der Optimismus im 20. Jahrhundert (West Germany), Candide, avagy a XX. század optimizmusa (Hungary), and Kandyd czyli optymizm XX wieku (Poland).

== Plot ==
The film is a 20th-century adaptation of Voltaire's 1759 social satire novel Candide, ou l'Optimisme. Set in the World War II-era, it follows the adventures of Candide, an orphaned Westphalian brought up in a baron's chalet. He falls in love with the baron's daughter, Cunégonde, and is thrown out of the house when the baron discovers them kissing. When war breaks out in 1939, Candide is drafted and then captured by the Nazis, but escapes and joins the International Red Cross. Candide's improbable adventures take him into a concentration camp to rescue his tutor, Pangloss; then he is off to South America (where he endures a series of revolutions), Borneo (where he is imprisoned by a primitive tribe), Moscow (where he accidentally foments a missile crisis between the Soviet Union and the United States), and New York (where he gets mixed up in a racial clash). Finally, back in France, he retires to a country house with Cunégonde, Pangloss, and a mysterious lady who saved him from a firing squad, and settles down to write his memoirs.

== Other film treatments ==
In 1947 Marcel Carné intended to create a film based on Voltaire's 1759 satire Candide, but production was abandoned. The 1986 film Live from Lincoln Center: Candide was also based on the same novel.

== Cast ==
- Jean-Pierre Cassel: Candide
- Louis de Funès: the officer of the Gestapo
- Pierre Brasseur: Pangloss
- Daliah Lavi: Cunégonde, the daughter of baron
- Nadia Gray: the live-in companion of Cunégonde
- Michel Simon: the colonel Nanar
- Jean Richard: the trafficker of the black market
- Darío Moreno: Don Fernando, the first dictator
- Luis Mariano: the second dictator South American
- Jean Tissier: the doctor Jacques
- Jacqueline Maillan: the puritanical mother
- Jean Poiret: a policeman
- Michel Serrault: a policeman
- Albert Simonin: the major Simpson
- Mathilde Casadesus: the baroness of Thunder-Ten-Trouck
- Robert Manuel: all German officers
- Jean Constantin: the king Fourak
- Don Ziegler: the papa gangster
- O'dett: the baron Thunder-Ten-Trouck
- Michel Garland: the brother of Cunégonde
- Jacques Balutin: the prescription of the colonel
- Gib Grossac: the leader of the Eunuches
- Michèle Verez: Paquerette, the maid of the baroness
- Sybil Saulnier: a lady from the harem
- Habib Benglia: the manhandled Black
- Mireille Alcon: a lady from the harem
- Danielle Tissier: a lady from the harem
- François Chalais: the commentator of the film
- Harold Kay: an American officer
- John William: the leader of "Oreillons"
- Pierre Repp: the priest
- Alice Sapritch: the sister of the baron
- Maurice Biraud: the Dutchman from Bornéo
- Michel Thomass: a Soviet driver
