= Chouans! =

1988 French historical adventure film

- Theatrical release poster
- Directed by: Philippe de Broca
- Written by: Philippe de Broca; Daniel Boulanger
- Produced by: Ariel Zeitoun
- Starring: Sophie Marceau; Philippe Noiret; Lambert Wilson
- Cinematography: Bernard Zitzermann
- Edited by: Henri Lanoë
- Music by: Georges Delerue
- Distributed by: UGC
- Release date: 23 March 1988 (France)
- Running time: 143 minutes
- Country: France
- Language: French

Chouans! is a 1988 French historical adventure film directed by Philippe de Broca and starring Sophie Marceau, Philippe Noiret, and Lambert Wilson. Loosely based on the 1829 novel Les Chouans by Honoré de Balzac, the film is about a woman who must choose between two brothers on opposite sides of the French Civil War of 1793. For her performance in the film, Sophie Marceau received the Cabourg Romantic Film Festival Award for Best Actress.

== Plot ==
In 1793, during the French Revolution, a young woman named Céline (Sophie Marceau), who was adopted by Count Savinien de Kerfadec, must choose between two men who have been raised like her brothers, Tarquin Larmor (Lambert Wilson) and Aurèle de Kerfadec (Stéphane Freiss), while they take opposite sides in the conflict. Tarquin, also adopted by the Count, is a partisan of the French First Republic and defends the new political system; Aurèle, the Count's natural son, supports Royalism. Both sons are in love with Céline. After the French Revolutionary Army decimates the Breton people, an insurgency of peasants, clergy, and aristocrats launches a guerrilla war called the Chouannerie.

== Cast ==
- Philippe Noiret as Savinien de Kerfadec
- Sophie Marceau as Céline
- Lambert Wilson as Tarquin Larmor
- Stéphane Freiss as Aurèle de Kerfadec
- Charlotte de Turckheim as Olympe de Saint-Gildas
- Jean-Pierre Cassel as Baron de Tiffauges
- Roger Dumas as Bouchard
- Raoul Billerey as Grospierre
- Jacqueline Doyen as Adélaïde, l'Abbesse Marie de l'Assomption
- Vincent Schmitt as Lote
- Claudine Delvaux as Jeanne
- Jean Parédès as le Chapelain
- Isabelle Gélinas as Viviane
- Vincent de Bouard as Yvon
- Maxime Leroux as Le Prêtre réfractaire
- Luc-Antoine Diquéro as Le Sergent Pierrot
- Claude Aufaure as Croque-au-sel
- Michel Degand as Le Prêtre jureur

== Production ==
=== Filming locations ===
- Baden, Morbihan, France
- Belle Île, Morbihan, France
- Brittany, France
- Fort-la-Latte, Côtes-d'Armor, France
- Locronan, Finistère, France
- Meucon, Morbihan, France
- Poul-Fétan, Quistinic, Morbihan, France
- Sarzeau, Morbihan, France
- Île d'Hoedic, Morbihan, France

== Awards and nominations ==
- 1988 Cabourg Romantic Film Festival Award for Best Actress (Sophie Marceau) Won
- 1989 César Award for Most Promising Actor (Stéphane Freiss) Won
- 1989 César Award Nomination for Best Costume Design (Yvonne Sassinot de Nesle)
