= The Love Game (film) =

1960 film

- Film poster
- Directed by: Philippe de Broca
- Written by: Philippe de Broca; Daniel Boulanger
- Produced by: Claude Chabrol; Roland Nonin
- Starring: Jean-Pierre Cassel
- Cinematography: Jean Penzer
- Edited by: Laurence Méry-Clark
- Music by: Georges Delerue
- Release date: 1 June 1960
- Running time: 86 minutes
- Country: France
- Language: French

The Love Game (French: Les Jeux de l'amour) is a 1960 French comedy film directed by Philippe de Broca. It was entered into the 10th Berlin International Film Festival where it won the Silver Bear Extraordinary Jury Prize.

The film's distributor threatened to seek an injunction against the U.S. Commissioner of Customs, who delayed granting clearance for The Love Game to be exhibited in the United States.

== Plot ==
Suzanne wants to marry Victor and have children with him. Victor however is not interested in becoming a husband or a father. While he cannot be bothered into complying with her wishes, their mutual friend Francois would be happy to do so. Consequently, Suzanne eventually turns to Francois. This leaves Victor no other choice than to change his mind if he wants Suzanne back.

== Cast ==
- Jean-Pierre Cassel as Victor
- Geneviève Cluny as Suzanne
- Jean-Louis Maury as François
- Robert Vattier as L'acheteur galant
- Claude Cerval as Le consommateur
- Pierre Repp as L'automobiliste
- Maria Pacôme as Une cliente
- Jeanne Pérez as Le buraliste
- François Maistre as L'homme élégant
- Lud Germain as Le noir
- Claude Chabrol as Le forain
- Jackie Sardou
