= Jacques Balutin =

French actor

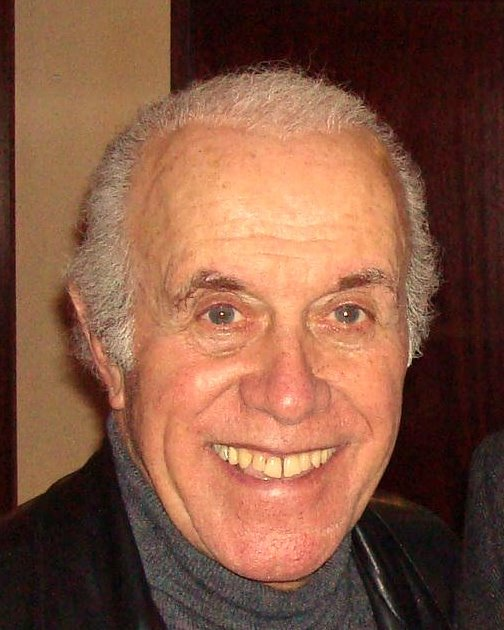
Jacques Balutin

Jacques Balutin is a French actor.

== Biography ==
Jacques Balutin was born on 29 June 1936 in Paris. His real name is William Buenos. He has acted in feature films, TV movies, short films, and as a voice actor. He is well renowned for being the French voice of detective David Starsky played by Paul Michael Glaser.

== Partial filmography ==
- The Joker (1960) - L'amoureux (uncredited)
- The Army Game (1960) - Corporal Bourrache
- Candide ou l'optimisme au XXe siècle (1960) - L'ordonnance
- Le Miracle des loups (1961) - Un spadassin (uncredited)
- La Belle Américaine (1961) - Balutin
- Cartouche (1962) - Le moine Capucine
- Les Culottes rouges (1962) - Phi-Phi, un chanteur de la troupe
- The Trip to Biarritz (1963) - Le reporter
- The Flashing Blade (TV series, 1960s)
- Coplan Takes Risks (1964) - Fondane
- The Great Spy Chase (1964) - Le douanier (scenes deleted)
- Les copains (1965) - Lesueur
- What's New Pussycat? (1965) - Etienne
- Un milliard dans un billard (1965) - Un agent
- Kings of Hearts (1966) - Mac Fish
- Asterix and Cleopatra (1968) - Tournevis (voice)
- The Devil by the Tail (1969) - Max, un gangster
- Delphine (1969) - Le photographe
- The Brain (1969) - L'inspecteur Pochet
- Erotissimo (1969) - Chauffeur de taxi
- Les patates (1969) - P'tit Louis
- Appelez-moi Mathilde (1969) - Le brigadier
- Tintin and the Temple of the Sun (1969) - Le témoin bègue à st.nazaire (voice)
- Atlantic Wall (1970) - Gendarme
- Daisy Town (1971) - William Dalton (voice)
- La guerre des espions (1972) - Jacques Borgniol-Valchoze
- The Gates of Fire (1972) - Soldat de garde
- Un cave (1972) - Tunel
- Les Joyeux Lurons (1972) - L'abbé Fénelon
- Tintin and the Lake of Sharks (1972) - Le gardien du musée (voice)
- Le concierge (1973) - Luigi - le serveur
- L'Intrépide (1975) - Un contrôleur
- Opération Lady Marlène (1975) - Capt. Dubois
- The Smurfs and the Magic Flute (1976) - Le buveur (voice)
- Le mille-pattes fait des claquettes (1977) - L'inspecteur adjoin
- Parisian Life (1977) - Urbain
- La Ballade des Dalton (1978) - William Dalton (voice)
- Who Is Killing the Great Chefs of Europe? (1978) - Chappemain
- La Cage aux Folles (1978) - (French version, voice)
- Sacrés gendarmes (1980) - Le brigadier
- The Wonderful Day (1980) - Le galeux
- Julien Fontanes, magistrat (1982) - Michel Courban
- Ça va pas être triste (1983) - Pivot
- C'est facile et ça peut rapporter... 20 ans (1983) - Le commissaire
- Mon curé chez les Thaïlandaises (1983) - Hubert McCormick
- Flics de choc (1983) - Gilet, le chauffeur du camion
- Lucky Luke (1983) - William Dalton (voice)
- Babar: The Movie (1989) - Zephir (French version, voice)
- Monsieur Papa (2011) - Le concierge (final film role)
