= Marc Dudicourt =

French actor (1932–2021)

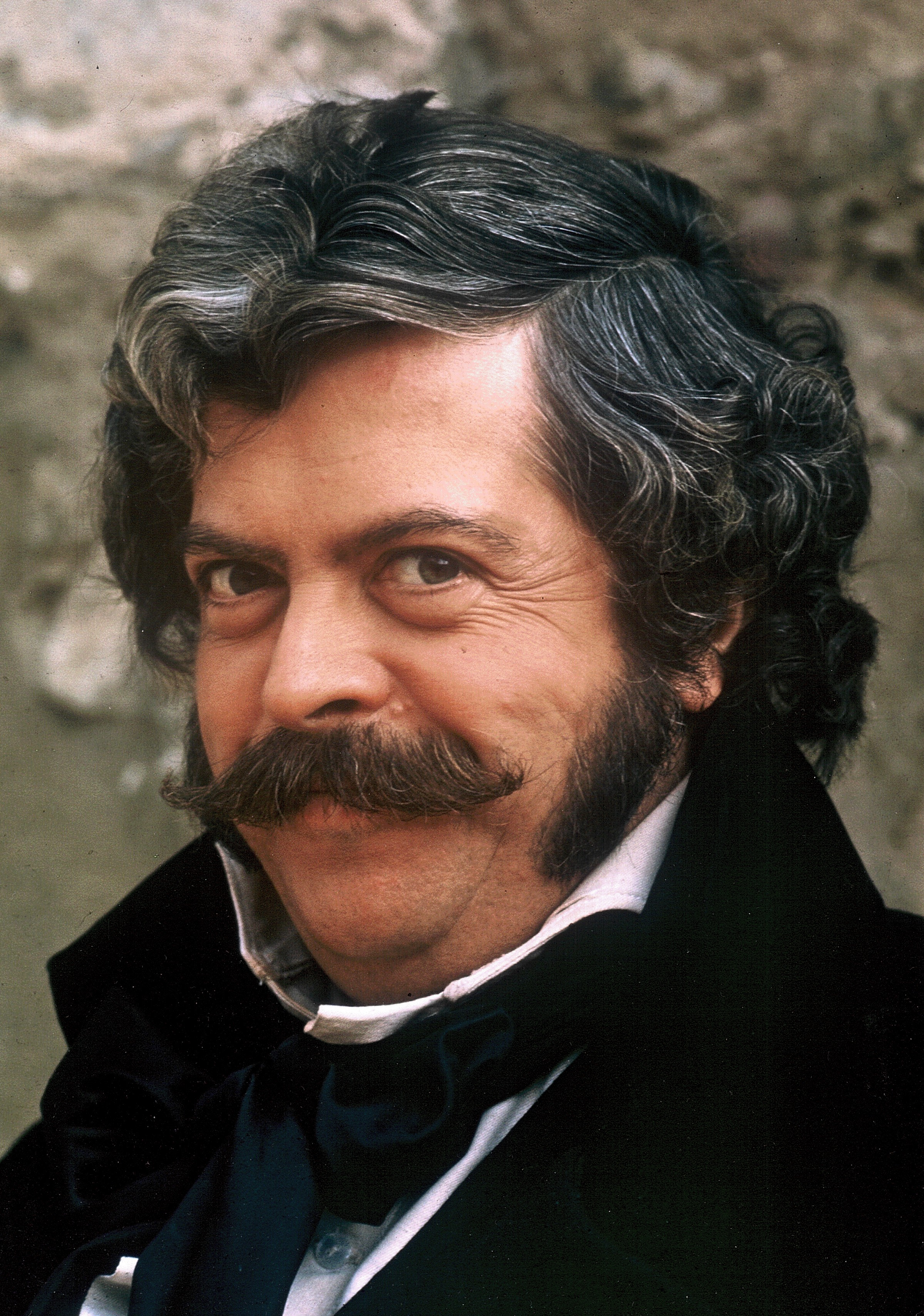
Dudicourt, as Inspecteur Flambard

Marc Dudicourt (6 May 1932 – 1 May 2021) was a French actor.

== Biography ==
Son of an industrial designer, he came to live in Paris with his family when he was eleven years old. Passionate about Walt Disney and cartooning, he decided to become a designer and was hired by Jean Image in his drawing workshop. Then, pushed by his colleagues because of his fun side, he decided to take lessons at the Théâtre National Populaire and played in several plays, notably alongside Maria Casarès and Alain Cuny. After the T.N.P. he went to the Comédie de l'Est then to the Villeurbanne theater where he staged Nikolai Gogol's Dead Souls. He stayed there for six years, and would acknowledge that Roger Planchon had taught him everything.

He became known to the public for the television series Les nouvelles aventures de Vidocq in 1971, in the role of Flambart.

He was the co-founder of the ACE15 association (cultural and event association of the 15th arrondissement of Paris) which runs the Georges Brassens Days in October in Parc Georges-Brassens each year.

Dudicourt was also, with his friend Rémi Gidel, founder and president of the 1901 law association "La Vie en Chansons" (lit. Life in Songs) which aims to defend French song and help young artists to become known.

== Partial filmography ==
- El Otro Cristóbal (1963) - Dictator Anastasio
- A Matter of Resistance (1966) - Schimmelbeck (uncredited)
- Made in U.S.A. (1966) - Barman (uncredited)
- King of Hearts (1966) - Lieutenant Hamburger
- The Thief of Paris (1967) - Georges Antoine
- Sheila in Bang Bang (1967) - Le notaire qui lit le testament (uncredited)
- Soleil O (1967)
- Very Happy Alexander (1968) - Monsieur Tondeur (uncredited)
- La bande à Bonnot (1968) - Le commissaire
- Les caprices de Marie (1970) - Le présentateur
- Dossier prostitution (1970) - Le logeur
- Ces messieurs de la gâchette (1970) - L'inspecteur
- The Married Couple of the Year Two (1971) - Le chauve
- Don't Deliver Us from Evil (1971) - L'aumônier
- Boulevard du Rhum (1971) - Le metteur en scène
- Gross Paris (1974)
- Un nuage entre les dents (1974) - Garnier
- Like a Pot of Strawberries (1974) - Le clochard
- Serious as Pleasure (1975) - Le mercier
- That Most Important Thing: Love (1975) - Mertolle (scenes deleted)
- Soldat Duroc, ça va être ta fête! (1975) - L'adjudant Médeux
- Incorrigible (1975) - Le gardien du ministère
- L'exercice du pouvoir (1977)
- Alors heureux? (1980) - Le maire (scenes deleted)
- Jupiter's Thigh (1980) - Spiratos
- Tête à claques (1982) - Directeur prison
- Les malheurs d'Octavie (1983) - L'ambassadeur du Goulachistan
- Le secret des sélénites (1983) - (voice)
- Polar (1984) - Le Loup
- Nuit d'ivresse (1986) - Le président Bulot
- Frantic (1988) - Cafe Owner
- À notre regrettable époux (1988) - Le curé
- Sherazade (1990)
- Justinien Trouvé, ou le bâtard de Dieu (1993) - Marquis Alix
- Zadoc et le bonheur (1995) - Le curé
- Les truffes (1995) - M'nsieur Martinez
- Beaumarchais (1996) - Bartholo
