= François Maistre =

French actor

- Born: 14 May 1925; Demigny, Saône-et-Loire, France
- Died: 16 May 2016 (aged 91); Sèvres, France
- Occupation: Actor
- Years active: 1960–2003

François Maistre (14 May 1925 – 16 May 2016) was a French film, television and theatre actor. Born in Demigny, Saône-et-Loire, France, he appeared in nearly 100 films between 1960 and 2003. His father was singer and actor A.-M. Julien.

== Selected filmography ==
- Le 7eme jour de Saint-Malo (1960)
- Les Jeux de l'amour (1960) – L'homme élégant
- The Joker (1960) – André Laroche
- Le bal des espions (1960)
- Napoleon II, the Eagle (1961) – Fürst Metternich
- Famous Love Affairs (1961) – Le commissaire Massot (segment "Jenny de Lacour")
- Paris Belongs to Us (1961) – Pierre Goupil
- The Immoral Moment (1962) – Patrice de Laborde
- À fleur de peau (1962) – Le commissaire
- Blague dans le coin (1963) – Sammy Bradford
- Thank You, Natercia (1963) – L'avoué
- À couteaux tirés (196) – Le médecin
- Angélique, Marquise des Anges (1964) – Le prince de Condé
- The Shameless Old Lady (1965) – Gaston
- Marvelous Angelique (1965) – Prionce de Condé
- Furia à Bahia pour OSS 117 (1965) – Carlos
- Four Queens for an Ace (1966) – Hakim Gregory
- Belle de Jour (1967) – L'enseignant
- Casse-tête chinois pour le judoka (1967) – Dragon
- La Louve solitaire (1968) – Davenport
- The Milky Way (1969) – Le curé fou / French Priest
- Last Leap (1970) – (uncredited)
- Distracted (1970) – Monsieur Gastier
- The Discreet Charm of the Bourgeoisie (1972) – Inspector Delecluze
- Night Flight from Moscow (1973) – Inspector Joss – Airport Police
- La punition (1973) – Le promoteur
- The Phantom of Liberty (1974) – Le professeur des gendarmes / Professor
- The Tiger Brigades (1974, TV series) – Faivre, le patron
- Innocents with Dirty Hands (1975) – Le commissaire Lamy
- Section spéciale (1975) – Marquis Fernand de Brinon, – le délégué général de Vichy
- Chronicle of the Years of Fire (1975) – Le contremaître de la carrière
- La Bulle (1975) – Le chef
- Les beaux messieurs de Bois-Doré (1976–1977, TV Mini-Series) – L'abbé Poulain
- Jaroslaw Dabrowski (1976) – Louis Adolphe Thiers
- Les conquistadores (1976)
- Le trouble-fesses (1976) – Don Pasquale
- Violette Nozière (1978) – Monsieur Mayeul
- Qu'il est joli garçon l'assassin de papa (1979) – Don Diègue
- Mamito (1980) – Monsieur Laurence
- Vivre libre ou mourir (1980) – Le procureur de la République
- Engrenage (1980) – Corbert
- Fais gaffe à la gaffe ! (1981) – Dumoulin
- Une glace avec deux boules... (1982) – François Dalbion
- Arrêt sur image (1987) – L'oncle d'Alice
- Story of Women (1988) – Le président Lamarre-Coudray
- Rouget le Braconnier (1989) – Père Rouget
- Madame Bovary (1991) – Lieuvain – le conseiller de la préfecture
- The Flower of Evil (2003) – Jules
