= Maria Pacôme =

French actress and playwright (1923–2018)

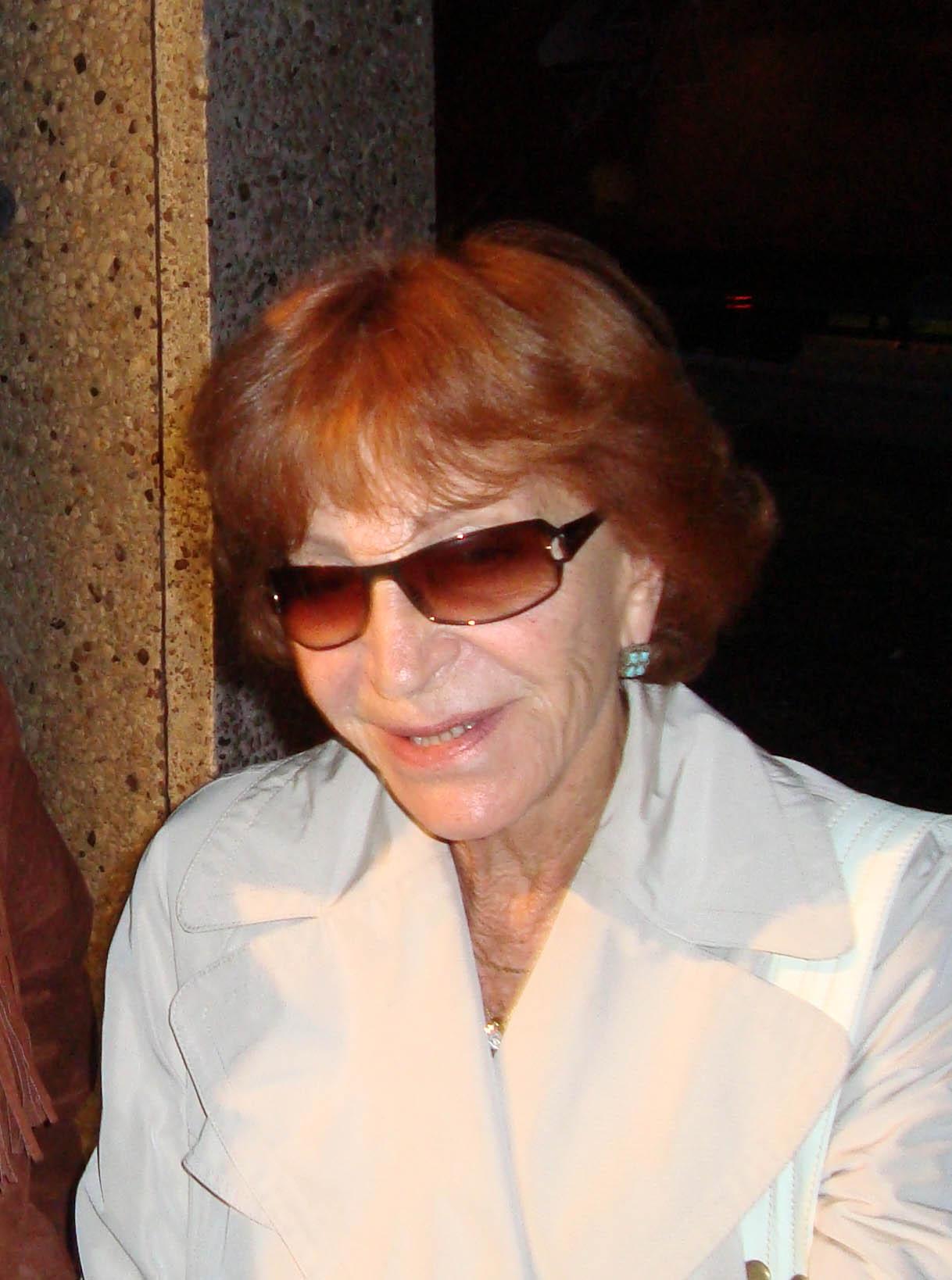
- Pacôme in 2017
- Born: 18 July 1923; Paris, France
- Died: 1 December 2018 (aged 95); Ballainvilliers, France
- Other name: Simonne Maria Pacôme
- Occupations: Actress; playwright

Maria Pacôme (French pronunciation: [maʁja pakom]; 18 July 1923 – 1 December 2018) was a French actress and playwright.

== Biography ==
Born on 18 July 1923 in Paris, Pacôme was the daughter of Maurice Pacôme and Germaine Hivonait. Her father was deported to Buchenwald concentration camp and her brother was shot for being a Communist. When her father came back, Pacôme often found herself defending her mother against her father's violence.

Maria began her higher education at Cours Simon in 1941, when she was 18. She was classmates with Michèle Morgan, Danièle Delorme, and her future spouse, Maurice Ronet. Pacôme married Ronet in 1950. She would set aside her career until their divorce in 1956.

=== Theatre ===
She began her stage acting career in 1956 with La Reine et les Insurgés, written by Ugo Betti and directed by Michel Vitold. In 1958, she acted in Oscar, written by Claude Magnier. She acted alongside Pierre Mondy and Jean-Paul Belmondo in the play. Pacôme also appeared in N'écoutez pas, mesdames ! by Sacha Guitry in 1962, Les Grosses Têtes by Jean Poiret and Michel Serrault in 1969, and Joyeuses Pâques by Poiret in 1981.

=== Movies ===
Pacôme's first appearance on the big screen came in 1959 with Come Dance with Me!, directed by Michel Boisrond. She later took on numerous supporting roles, most notably in The Troops of St. Tropez, Up to His Ears, and Le Distrait. Afterwards, she achieved leading roles in La situation est grave… mais pas désespérée by Jacques Besnard, Les Sous-doués by Claude Zidi, and The Crisis (La Crise) by Coline Serreau.

=== Author and Playwright ===
Pacôme wrote seven plays: Apprends-moi Céline, Le Jardin d'Éponine, On m'appelle Émilie, Les Seins de Lola, Et moi et moi, Les Désarrois de Gilda Rumeur, and L'Éloge de ma paresse.

She wrote her memoirs, titled Maria sans Pacôme, in 2007.

=== Television ===
Pacôme appeared in several TV movies, most notably starring in Docteur Sylvestre.

In 2006, she played the role of Hortense Bertin in the drama Les Secrets du volcan, directed by Michaëla Watteaux.

In 2011, she was the voice actor for the character "Granny" in the movie Titeuf.

=== Death ===
Pacôme died on 1 December 2018 in Ballainvilliers, France following a tumor near the amygdala.

Her burial at the Père Lachaise Cemetery on 10 December 2018 was attended by celebrities such as Daniel Auteuil and Bernard Le Coq.

== Filmography ==
Year	Title	Role	Notes
1959	Come Dance with Me!	Madame Decauville-Lachenée	
1960	The Love Game	Une cliente	
1961	Le Tracassin	Madame Gonzalès	
1962	Un clair de lune à Maubeuge	La journaliste	
1964	Constance aux enfers	Marie-Cecile	
1964	Rien ne va plus	La comtesse	
1964	Une souris chez les hommes	Tante Emma	
1964	Que personne ne sorte	Pauline – la cuisinière	
1964	The Troops of St. Tropez	Mme Lareine Leroy	
1964	The Gorillas	Josépha Dépelouze	
1965	Up to His Ears	Suzy Ponchabert	
1966	Les combinards	Lucienne	
1966	Tender Scoundrel	Germaine	
1968	A Strange Kind of Colonel	Aurélia	
1969	La maison de campagne	Véronique	
1970	Distracted	Glycia Malaquet	
1974	Bons baisers... à lundi	Myrette	
1975	Pas de problème!	Madame Michalon	
1976	La situation est grave... mais pas désespérée	Vicomtesse Sophie de Valrude	
1976	Silence... on tourne	La mère d'Elisabeth	
1977	Le dernier baiser	L'inconnue	
1980	Les sous-doués	Lucie Jumaucourt	
1992	La Crise	Mme Barelle	
1996	Le bel été 1914	Maria	
1997	Une femme très très très amoureuse	Emma	
2003	Mauvais esprit	Belle-maman	
2011	Titeuf	Mémé	Voice
2012	Arrête de pleurer Pénélope	Lise	(final film role)
