= Women's Club (1956 film) =

1956 film

- Directed by: Ralph Habib
- Written by: Jacques Deval (novel); Paul Andréota; Jean Aurel; Jacques Companéez; Ralph Habib; Annette Wademant
- Produced by: Francis Cosne; Alexandre Mnouchkine; Georges Lourau
- Starring: Nicole Courcel; Dany Carrel; Ivan Desny
- Cinematography: Pierre Petit
- Edited by: Françoise Javet
- Music by: Georges Van Parys
- Production companies: Les Films Ariane; Filmsonor; Cinétel; Rizzoli Film
- Distributed by: Cinédis (France)
- Release date: 7 December 1956
- Running time: 81 minutes
- Countries: France; Italy
- Language: French

Women's Club (French: Club de femmes) is a 1956 French-Italian drama film directed by Ralph Habib and starring Nicole Courcel, Dany Carrel and Ivan Desny.

== Cast ==
- Nicole Courcel as Nicole Leroy
- Dany Carrel as Sylvie
- Ivan Desny as Laurent Gauthier
- Jean-Louis Trintignant as Michel
- Giorgia Moll as Gina
- Vanja Orico
- Guy Bertil as Daniel
- Jean Martinelli as M. Mouss
- Jean-Marc Tennberg as M. Morel
- Noël Roquevert as Le notaire
- Maurice Gardett as Le voisin
- Béatrice Altariba as Dominique
- Françoise Delbart as Chounette
- Vega Vinci as Françoise
- Chantal de Rieux as Françoise
- Sophie Grimaldi as Jacqueline
- Jacqueline Dorian as Geneviève
- Claudine Bleuse as Mireille
- Margaret Rung
- Fédora as Fédora
- Mijanou Bardot as Micheline
- Pierre Repp as L'huissier
- Agnès Laurent
- Daniel Ceccaldi
- Marie-José Nat
- Dominique Boschero
- Alexandra Stewart
- Annie Andrel
- Guy Tréjan
- Colette Fleury

== Bibliography ==
- Bock, Hans-Michael & Bergfelder, Tim. The Concise Cinegraph: Encyclopaedia of German Cinema. Berghahn Books, 2009.
