= King of Hearts (1966 film) =

Le Roi de cœur (original French title) King of Hearts (United States)
- French theatrical release poster
- Directed by: Philippe de Broca
- Screenplay by: Daniel Boulanger; Philippe de Broca
- Story by: Maurice Bessy
- Produced by: Philippe de Broca
- Starring: Alan Bates; Geneviève Bujold
- Cinematography: Pierre Lhomme
- Edited by: Francoise Javet (II)
- Music by: Georges Delerue
- Distributed by: Les Artistes Associés
- Release date: 21 December 1966
- Running time: 102 minutes
- Country: France
- Languages: French, English, German
- Box office: $580,000

King of Hearts (original French title: Le Roi de cœur) is a 1966 French/Italian international co-production comedy-drama film directed by Philippe de Broca and starring Alan Bates and Geneviève Bujold.

The film is set in a small town in France near the end of World War I. As the Imperial German Army retreats, they booby trap the whole town to explode. The locals flee and, left to their own devices, a gaggle of cheerful lunatics escape the asylum and take over the town — thoroughly confusing the lone Scottish soldier who has been dispatched to defuse the bomb.

== Plot ==
In October 1918, as the Great War is ending, a small village in France is awaiting liberation from German occupiers. The retreating Germans wire the automaton clock in the main square to set off a bomb when the mechanical knight strikes the bell at midnight, blowing up the ammunition magazine and the entire town. The town’s barber, an Allied agent, overhears and passes the word of the impending explosion. The residents abandon the town, leaving behind the occupants of the insane asylum. The barber is killed while transmitting to the Allies, only managing to relay that the magazine will blow up when "the knight strikes at midnight."

Signaller Charles Plumpick, whose expertise is caring for war pigeons, not explosives, is sent by his colonel to disarm the bomb. He needs to discover the meaning of the phrase "the knight strikes at midnight." Arriving in town with two pigeons in a cage, Plumpick evades German soldiers. Slipping into the asylum, he puts on pajamas and mixes with inmates who introduce themselves as The Duke of Clubs and Monsignor Daisy. When Plumpick introduces himself as "the King of Hearts," the inmates accept him with deference and the Germans overlook him. Back in town, Plumpick is knocked unconscious by a falling pole, unaware when the inmates leave the asylum, occupy the town, and take on the roles of the townspeople. Regaining consciousness, Plumpick has no reason to think the people left in town are not who they appear to be, other than the colorful and playful way in which they're living their lives.

The barber, his supposed contact, does not recognize the password phrase "the whiting likes frying" and is unhelpful to Plumpick’s mission. "General Geranium" cannot direct him to the magazine. One of his pigeons is shot down by the Germans, who mistakenly interpret its message to mean the magazine has been dismantled. Finding the asylum empty, he realizes who is occupying the town. The lunatics crown Plumpick the "King of Hearts" with surreal pageantry as he frantically tries to find the bomb. The madame introduces him to the young innocent Poppy, a neophyte eager to help forget the war around them. Plumpick warns of the impending explosion at midnight, but everyone shrugs it off, living for the day. As "king," he decides to lead them all out of the town to safety. The inmates follow him to the edge of town but refuse to go further into the dangerous unknown world. As midnight approaches, he almost gives up.

At three minutes to midnight Plumpick is watching the clocktower with Poppy, anticipating the end. Poppy comments that the knight will come out at midnight. Suddenly Plumpick understands and climbs the clocktower to stop the mechanical knight from striking the bell. As he struggles to dislodge the bell, the knight approaches, strikes Plumpkin’s head instead of the bell, and then retreats. The town is saved.

As morning breaks, the Germans march toward town as the British colonel orders his men to line up, including Plumpick. Plumpick joins the formation, but Poppy and the women pull him out of the formation as it marches away. Despite his protests, they take their "king," bound and gagged, to a balcony overlooking the square to watch as the British and German troops confront and shoot each other dead. Plumpick is the only soldier left alive. A lookout announces that thousands of "liberators" are converging from all sides. Not wanting to meet the "outsiders," the inmates decide to leave and return to the insane asylum.

Plumpick and his surviving pigeon receive medals for their mission. While being transported with the troops past the asylum, Plumpick jumps off the truck, discards his rifle and uniform, and presents himself at the gate of the asylum, stark naked holding only the cage with his favorite pigeon. The inmates joyously welcome their "King of Hearts," and they all agree that he will never again leave them.

== Cast ==
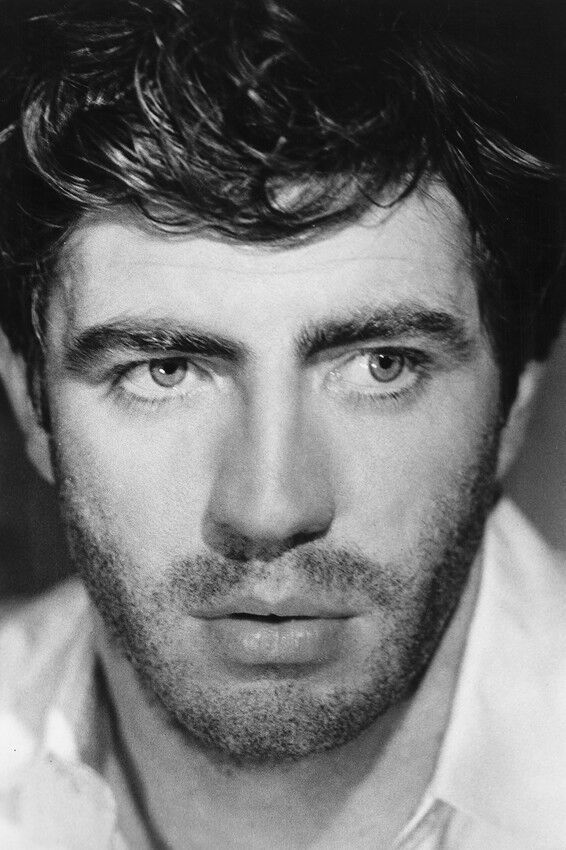
Alan Bates plays Charles Plumpick, who must find out the meaning of the phrase "The knight strikes at midnight."

- Jacques Balutin as Sergeant Mac Fish
- Alan Bates as the Soldier Charles Plumpick
- Daniel Boulanger as Colonel Von Krack
- Pierre Brasseur as Général Géranium
- Jean-Claude Brialy as The Duke of Clubs
- Geneviève Bujold as Poppy
- Pier Paolo Capponi as An English Officer
- Adolfo Celi as Colonel Mac Bibenbrook
- Françoise Christophe as The Duchess
- Daniel Prévost as Général Vallemat
- Madeleine Clervanne as Brunehaut
- Marc Dudicourt as Lieutenant Hamburger
- Julien Guiomar as Monseigneur Daisy
- Palau as Alberic
- Micheline Presle as Madame Eglantine
- Michel Serrault as Monsieur Marcel
- Philippe de Broca as Adolf Hitler (uncredited)

== Release ==
When it was released in France in 1966, King of Hearts was not especially successful critically or at the box office, with only 141,035 admissions.

However, it achieved cult film status when United States distribution rights were picked up by Randy Finley and Specialty Films in Seattle in 1973. It was paired with Marv Newland's Bambi Meets Godzilla and John Magnuson's Thank You Mask Man and marketed under the heading The King of Hearts and His Loyal Short Subjects. During the mid 1970s, it was presented in repertory movie theaters as well as non-theatrical college and university film series across the United States, eventually running for five years at the now defunct film house the Central Square Cinemas (2 screens) in Cambridge, Massachusetts.

On the review aggregator website Rotten Tomatoes, 89% of 18 critics' reviews are positive.

== Stage adaptation ==
In 1978, King of Hearts was adapted as a Broadway musical of the same name, with a book by Joseph Stein, lyrics by Jacob Brackman, music by Peter Link, orchestrations by Bill Brohn, set design by Santo Loquasto, and direction and choreography by Ron Field. The cast featured Don Scardino as the lead character, who was reworked as an American soldier named Johnny Perkins. Pamela Blair, Bob Gunton, and Millicent Martin played supporting roles. Opening at New York City's Minskoff Theatre on 22 October, amid the three-month 1978 New York City newspaper strike that may have impeded its advance publicity, the show closed after 48 performances.
