= That Man from Rio =

- Theatrical release poster by Yves Thos
- Directed by: Philippe de Broca
- Screenplay by: Daniel Boulanger
- Story by: Philippe de Broca; Jean-Paul Rappeneau; Ariane Mnouchkine; Daniel Boulanger
- Produced by: Georges Dancigers; Alexandre Mnouchkine
- Starring: Jean-Paul Belmondo; Françoise Dorléac; Jean Servais; Adolfo Celi
- Cinematography: Edmond Séchan
- Music by: Georges Delerue
- Production company: Les Films Ariane
- Distributed by: Les Productions Artistes Associés
- Release dates: 5 February 1964 (France); 16 August 1964 (Italy)
- Running time: 110 minutes
- Countries: France; Italy
- Language: French

That Man from Rio (French: L'Homme de Rio) is a 1964 French-Italian adventure film directed by Philippe de Broca and starring Jean-Paul Belmondo and Françoise Dorléac. It was the first film to be made by the French subsidiary of United Artists, Les Productions Artistes Associés. The film was a huge success with a total of 4,800,626 admissions in France, becoming the 5th highest earning film of the year.

This spoof of James Bond-type films features location photography by Edmond Séchan of Rio de Janeiro, Brasília, and Paris. At the 37th Academy Awards, the film was nominated for the Academy Award for Best Original Screenplay.

The film is directly inspired by the comics of Belgian cartoonist Hergé, featuring a number of scenes that are direct retelling of plot points in The Adventures of Tintin.

== Plot ==
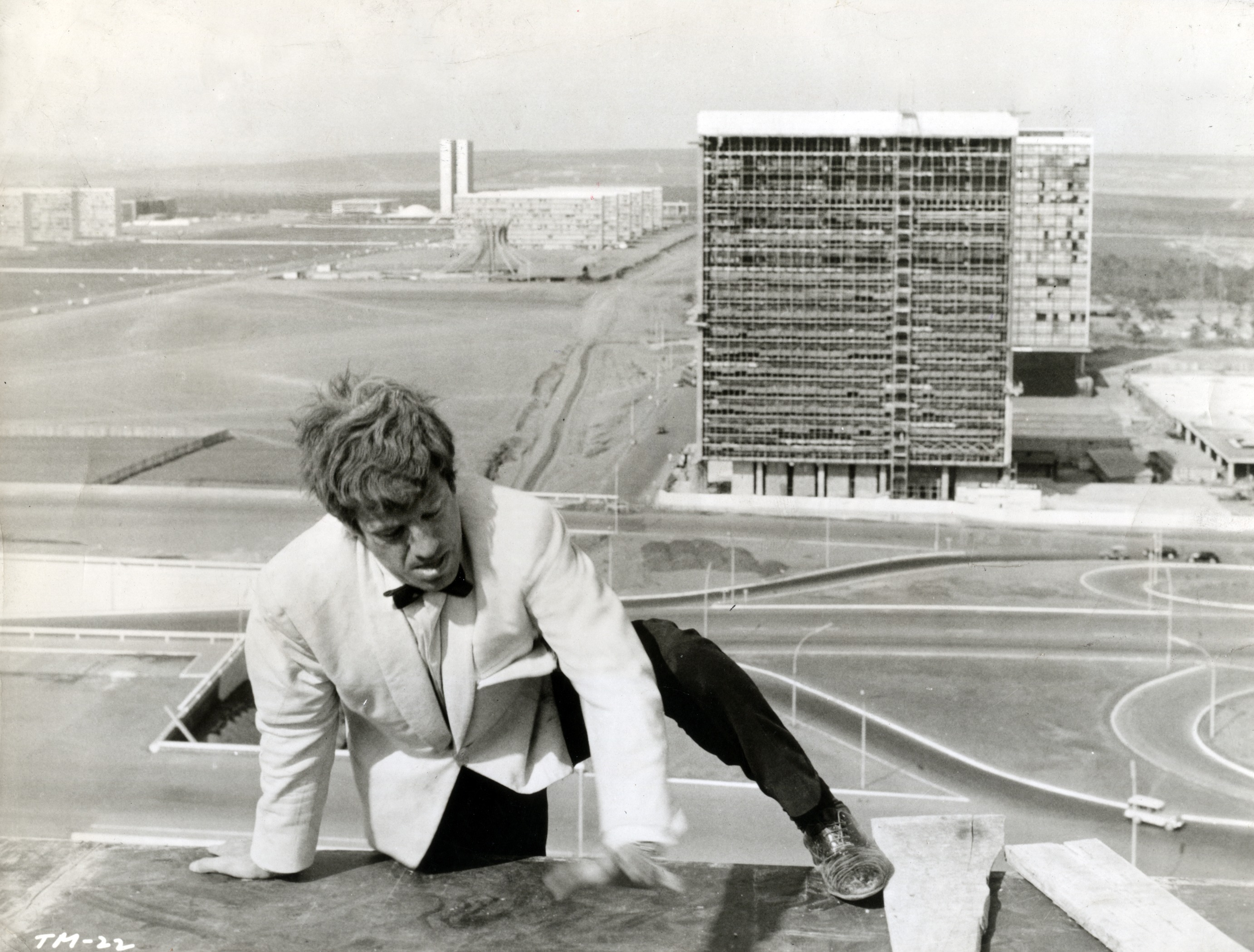
Adrien Dufourquet (Jean Paul Belmondo) in Brasília

As airman Adrien Dufourquet embarks on an 8-day leave in Paris to see his fiancée Agnès, two South American Indians steal an Amazonian statuette from the Musée de l'Homme and force Professor Catalan, the curator, into their car. Catalan was the companion of Agnès' father on an expedition into the Amazonian rainforest during which her father died. Catalan believed that the statuette is one of three which hold the secret to an Amazonian treasure. Adrien arrives at Agnès' flat, in time to see the Indians abducting her, the only one who knows the location of her father's statuette. He pursues them to the airport where he steals a ticket and boards the same plane.

Adrien tells the pilot that his fiancée has been kidnapped, but Agnès has been drugged and does not recognize him. The pilot plans to have Adrien arrested when they reach Rio de Janeiro, but Adrien eludes the police upon arrival. With the help of Sir Winston, a Brazilian bootblack, Adrien rescues Agnès. They retrieve the buried statuette, but the Indians steal it from them.

In a stolen car provided by Sir Winston, Agnès and Adrien drive to Brasília to meet Senhor de Castro, a wealthy industrialist who possesses the third statuette. On the way, they come across the Indians' car with Catalan slumped inside; after picking him up, they drive on to Brasília, where Adrien manages to escape from the gangsters tailing him by crossing between two skyscrapers under construction on a cable.

Adrien and Agnes manage to go to a party in their honor given by De Castro, who takes Catalan to his strong room to assure him of the statuette's safety. But Catalan, who had planned the museum theft, murders him and steals the statuette. By the time Adrien discovers the body, Catalan and the Indians have abducted Agnès again and escaped in a seaplane. Adrien steals a plane and follows.

In a floating jungle cafe run by Lola, the woman who financed Catalan, Adrien learns that Catalan murdered Agnès' father and that Agnès is being held in a boat. Rushing to the boat, Adrien hangs onto the side as it heads upstream and finally docks. While Catalan goes to a grotto in the jungle where the three statuettes once lined-up with the rays of the sun will reveal the location of the treasure, Adrien knocks out all of Catalan's accomplices and rescues Agnès. Catalan finds the treasure, but explosions set off by a nearby Trans-Amazonian Highway construction crew causes him to be buried with it. Adrien and Agnès flee and arrive in Paris, in time for Adrien to catch his train back to his garrison. As he onboards the train, one of his mates grabs him and excitedly tells him what an incredible week he's had, "you'd never imagine what".

== Cast ==
- Jean-Paul Belmondo as Pvt. Adrien Dufourquet
- Françoise Dorléac as Agnès Villermosa
- Jean Servais as the Prof. Norbert Catalan
- Adolfo Celi as Mario de Castro
- Simone Renant as Lola
- Roger Dumas as Lebel, Dufourquet's buddy
- Daniel Ceccaldi as Police inspector
- Milton Ribeiro as Tupac
- Ubiracy de Oliveira as Sir Winston the shoeshiner
- Sabu do Brasil
- Peter Fernandez
- Annik Malvil as Airplane Hostess

== Production ==
The film was a follow-up to Cartouche, a popular swashbuckler with Belmondo. It was decided that he should star in a James Bond spoof. Italian financing of the film led to the Italian actor Adolfo Celi, then resident in Brazil, being cast as Mario de Castro.

Jean-Paul Belmondo's personal tastes were Tintin comics, sports magazines, and detective novels. He said he preferred "making adventure films like Rio to the intellectual movies of Alain Resnais or Alain Robbe-Grillet."

== Release ==
That Man from Rio was released in France on 28 February 1964.

== Reception ==
=== Awards ===
The film was nominated for Best Original Screenplay at the Academy Awards.

=== Critical ===
In contemporary reviews, the Monthly Film Bulletin reviewed an English-dubbed version; one of its critics noted that the "One may feel that [de Broca]'s inconsequential wit is better suited to the smaller, more parochial atmosphere of his earlier films, but here he is involved in a big budget production aimed at a huge audience, and perhaps we ought to be grateful that so much of his personal style has survived, even in the carefully dubbed and slightly shortened American version now presented." The review noted that the film was "beautifully organised" and that "it always keeps the chuckles rising even if they seldom break into real guffaws." and praised the two leads, specifically Belmondo who "outdid Douglas Fairbanks in agility, Harold Lloyd in cliffhanging, and James Bond in indestructibility".

Stanley Kauffmann of The New Republic called That Man from Rio "a delightful film".

In a retrospective review, The Dissolve gave the film a rating of three and a half stars out of five, noting that "the action moves along at such a rapid clip, there's little time to worry about how much the plot relies on incredible coincidences".

Time Out selected the movie as #99 for its list of the 100 greatest French films.

On review aggregator website Rotten Tomatoes, the film holds an approval rating of 79% based on 14 reviews.

=== Influence ===
Film scholar Cédric Pérolini has argued that the film may be seen as a "missing link" between The Adventures of Tintin comic by Hergé and Spielberg's Indiana Jones and the Last Crusade. Author Dominique Maricq has stated that "Spielberg even declared having watched it [That Man from Rio] nine times! Did he not know that, to construct his scenario, the Frenchman had himself largely drawn from the boxes and bubbles of the Adventures of Tintin series?" All three pieces of media contain a number of very similar scenes and plot points. For example, at one point in The Man from Rio, Catalan steals a car while it is being repaired, an event that appears in both Tintin in the Land of the Soviets and Indiana Jones and the Last Crusade.

== Remake ==
In 2025, a modernized remake was announced for Apple Original Films. Sydney Sweeney is set to star and Justin Lin will direct and produce.
