= Philippe de Broca =

French film director (1933–2004)

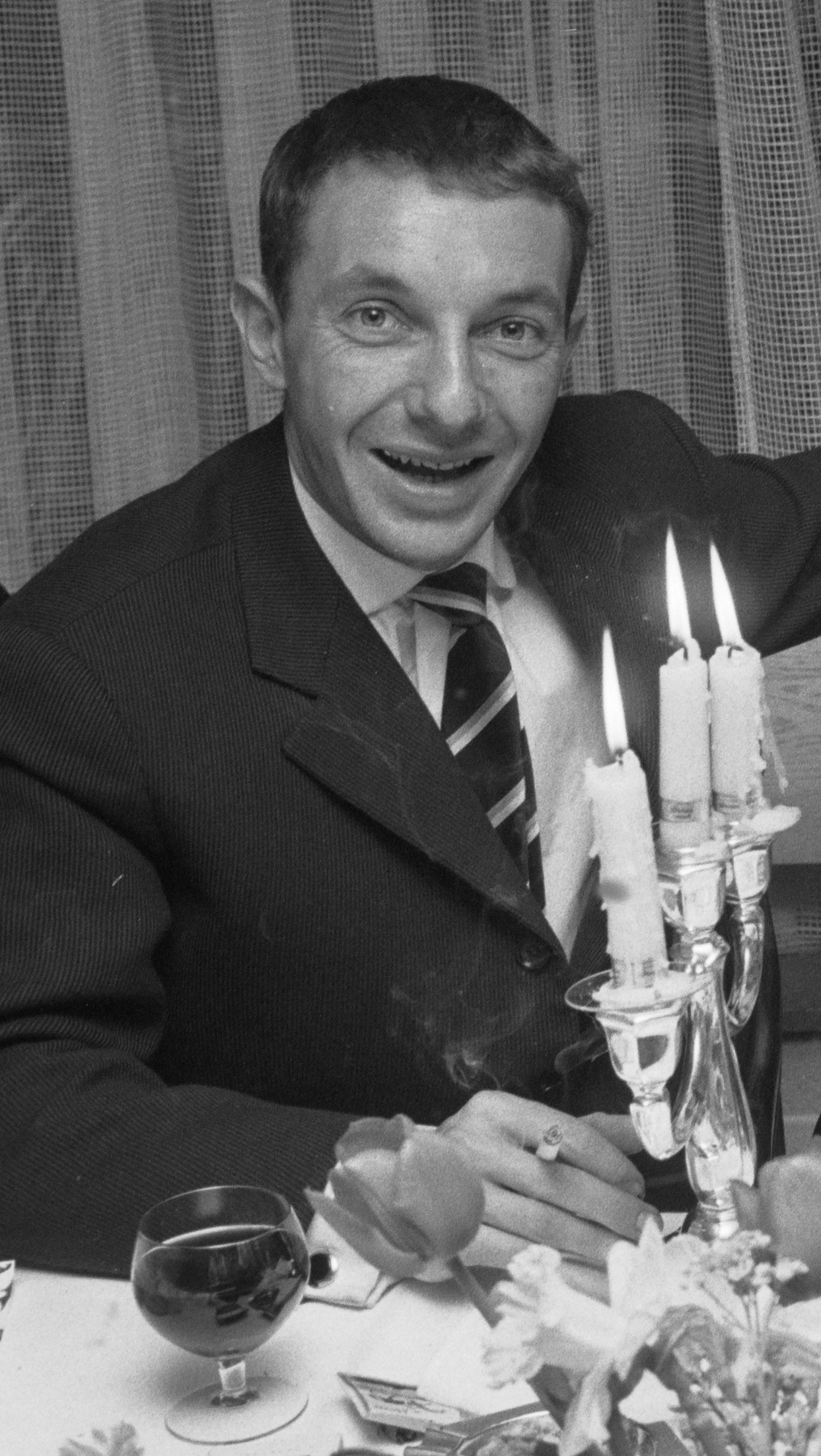
- de Broca in 1962
- Born: Philippe Claude Alex de Broca de Ferrussac; 15 March 1933; Paris, France
- Died: 26 November 2004 (aged 71); Neuilly-sur-Seine, France
- Occupation: Film director
- Years active: 1959–2004
- Spouses: Michelle de Broca (m. 1958; div. 1961) Margot Kidder (m. 1983; div. 1984) Valérie Rojan (m. 1987)
- Partner: Marthe Keller (1970s)
- Children: 3

Philippe Claude Alex de Broca de Ferrussac (French: [filip də bʁɔka]; 15 March 1933 – 26 November 2004) was a French film director.

He directed 30 full-length feature films, including the highly successful That Man from Rio (L'Homme de Rio), The Man from Acapulco (Le Magnifique) and On Guard (Le Bossu). His works include historical, romantic epics such as Chouans! and King of Hearts (Le Roi de cœur), as well as comedies with a charismatic, breezy hero ready to embark upon any adventure which comes his way, so long as it means escaping everyday modern life: Practice Makes Perfect (Le Cavaleur), The Devil by the Tail (Le Diable par la queue), The African (L'Africain). His frequent collaborators included actors Jean-Paul Belmondo - who starred in six of his films - Jean-Pierre Cassel, Philippe Noiret and Jean Rochefort.

== Biography ==
Philippe de Broca was born on 15 March 1933 in Paris. He was the son of a cinema set designer and the grandson of a well-known painter, Alexis de Broca. He studied at the Paris Photography and Cinematography School (école Vaugirard), graduating in 1953. He carried out his military service with the French Army's service cinématographique des armées (army film service) in Germany and then in Algeria, directing or acting as head cameraman on short films. Greatly affected by the war he witnessed in Algeria, he vowed to show life in its best light in his future films "because laughter is the best defence against upsets in life". After his discharge from the military, he set off on a journey taking in the length of Africa in Berliet trucks before returning to Paris.

He began working as an intern with Henri Decoin, before finding assistant positions with Claude Chabrol: Bitter Reunion (Le Beau Serge), The Cousins (Les Cousins), Web of Passion (À Double Tour), François Truffaut: The 400 Blows (Les 400 Coups) and Pierre Schoendoerffer: Ramuntcho. In 1959, Claude Chabrol produced de Broca's first film for him, The Love Game (Les jeux de l'amour) with Jean-Pierre Cassel. De Broca went on to work with Cassel again in The Joker (Le Farceur, 1960), Five Day Lover (L'Amant de cinq jours, 1961), and Male Companion (Un Monsieur de Compagnie, 1964).

De Broca's first commercial success came with Swords of Blood (Cartouche), filmed in 1962. This film also saw two more names become associated with de Broca: the actor Jean-Paul Belmondo and the producer Alexandre Mnouchkine. International acclaim came with That Man from Rio (L'Homme de Rio) in 1964, Up to His Ears (Les tribulations d'un Chinois en Chine) in 1965, The Man from Acapulco (Le Magnifique) in 1973 and Incorrigible (L'Incorrigible) in 1975.

In 1966, he co-wrote, directed and produced King of Hearts (Le Roi de Cœur). This parody of the Great War, which some cinema-lovers consider his masterpiece, was a commercial and personal failure, to de Broca's dismay. Yet it eventually achieved genuine cult-film status during the mid 1970s when it was presented in repertory movie theaters as well as non-theatrical college and university film series across the United States, eventually running for five years at the now defunct film house, the Central Square Cinemas in Cambridge, Massachusetts.

Next his career took a turn towards seemingly straightforward comedy and fun: The Devil by the Tail (Le Diable par la queue) featuring Yves Montand in 1969, then Dear Detective (Tendre Poulet) in 1978 and Jupiter's Thigh (On a volé la cuisse de Jupiter) in 1980 with Philippe Noiret and Annie Girardot, and finally Practice Makes Perfect (Le Cavaleur) in 1979 with Jean Rochefort.

In 1988, his film Chouans! with Sophie Marceau and Philippe Noiret, which questioned historical philosophies, was not as successful as expected.

He then directed ten or so telefilms, enjoying the speed of filming as well as the teamwork involved. De Broca found success again in 1997 with his adaptation of On Guard (Le Bossu) for Daniel Auteuil.

In 2004 Philippe de Broca filmed the adaptation of the novel Viper in the Fist (Vipère au poing) with Jacques Villeret and Catherine Frot. This movie was to be his last hit with the cinema-going public, although he was not able to enjoy the success, dying from cancer on 26 November 2004.

Throughout his career, de Broca's work alternates between two styles: large-scale productions like Swords of Blood (Cartouche), King of Hearts (Le Roi de cœur) or On Guard (Le Bossu), and lively, punchy contemporary adventure-comedies like That Man from Rio (L'Homme de Rio), The Man from Acapulco (Le Magnifique) or Practice Makes Perfect (Le Cavaleur). Yet even this dual classification is not easily applied to Philippe de Broca's work, because the man himself hated conventions and enjoyed blurring the line between the real world and the imaginary. His films, which may at first glance seem lightweight, are being re-assessed by cinema-lovers as a thoughtful life's work, which asks questions about society in the second half of the 20th century.

De Broca remained loyal to his actors throughout his films, as well as to the writers Daniel Boulanger and Michel Audiard, and enjoyed an exceptional musical affinity with Georges Delerue.

Today, Philippe de Broca is acknowledged by the younger generation of movie directors, such as Ryan Coogler, Antonio Negret or Emmanuel Issanchou, who frequently cite his work.

== Personal life ==
Philippe de Broca was married to Michelle de Broca, with whom he founded the production company Fildebroc. He has two daughters, Chloé and Jade, with Michelle; and one son Alexandre, with Swiss actress Marthe Keller. He was married for one year (1983-84) to Canadian-American actress Margot Kidder.

For over 30 years he lived in the village of Vert in the Yvelines department to the west of Paris, where he greatly enjoyed tending his garden. He felt a strong connection with Brittany since his childhood, his painter grandfather having lived there, as well as being fond of his boat. He died of cancer, aged 71, and chose to be buried in Sauzon cemetery on Belle-Ile.

== Filmography ==
=== Assistant director ===
- 1959 : Web of Passion (À Double Tour) by Claude Chabrol
- 1959 : The 400 Blows (Les 400 Coups) by François Truffaut
- 1959 : The Cousins (Les Cousins) by Claude Chabrol
- 1958 : Bitter Reunion (Le Beau Serge) by Claude Chabrol

=== Director ===
- 1953 : Les Trois Rendez-vous (short film) with Charles L. Bitsch, Edith Krausse
- 1954 : Salon nautique (short film, documentary)
- 1954 : Sous un autre soleil (short film, documentary)
- 1956 : Opération gas-oil (short film, documentary)
- 1960 : The Love Game / Playing at Love (Les Jeux de l'amour)
- 1960 : The Joker (Le Farceur)
- 1961 : Five Day Lover / Infidelity (L'Amant de cinq jours)
- 1962 : The Seven Deadly Sins (Les Sept Péchés capitaux) – La Gourmandise segment
- 1962 : Cartouche / Swords of Blood (Cartouche)
- 1963 : People in Luck (Les Veinards) – La vedette segment
- 1964 : That Man from Rio (L'Homme de Rio)
- 1964 : Male Companion / I was a Male Sex Bomb (Un monsieur de compagnie)
- 1965 : Up to His Ears (Les Tribulations d'un Chinois en Chine)
- 1966 : King of Hearts (Le Roi de Coeur)
- 1967 : The Oldest Profession (Le Plus Vieux Métier du monde) – La Révolution française segment
- 1969 :The Devil by the Tail
- 1970 : Give her the Moon (Les Caprices de Marie)
- 1971 : Touch and Go (La Poudre d'escampette)
- 1972 : Dear Louise (Chère Louise)
- 1973 : Le Magnifique / The Man from Acapulco (Le Magnifique)
- 1975 : Incorrigible (L'Incorrigible)
- 1977 : Julie Gluepot (Julie pot de colle)
- 1978 : Dear Detective (Tendre Poulet)
- 1979 : Practice Makes Perfect (Le Cavaleur)
- 1980 : Jupiter's Thigh (On a volé la cuisse de Jupiter)
- 1981 : Psy
- 1983 : The African (L'Africain)
- 1984 : Louisiana (Louisiana) (TV miniseries)
- 1986 : The Gypsy (La Gitane)
- 1988 : Chouans!
- 1990 : 1001 Nights / Sheherazade (Les 1001 nuits)
- 1991 : The Keys to Paradise (Les Clés du paradis)
- 1997 : On Guard (Le Bossu)
- 2000 : Amazon (Amazone)
- 2004 : Viper in the Fist (Vipère au poing)

=== Television ===
- 1993 : Regarde-moi quand je te quitte
- 1994 : The Greenhouse (Le jardin des plantes)
- 1995 : Les hommes et les femmes sont faits pour vivre heureux... mais pas ensemble
- 2001 : Un amour en kit
- 1996 : Le Veilleur de nuit
- 2002 : Madame Sans-Gêne
- 2003 : Y aura pas école demain
- 2003 : Le menteur

== Discography ==
The majority of the music featured in Philippe de Broca's films has been published in its own right. Below are a few notable compilations.

- In 2003, the label Universal Music Jazz issued two records called Le cinéma de Philippe de Broca – musiques de Georges Delerue. The first covers the period from 1959 to 1968, with the second covering 1969 to 1988. They feature the themes from seventeen of the director's films, from Playing at Love (Les Jeux de l'amour) to Chouans.
- In 2007, the Canadian label Disques Cinémusique released Les Plus beaux Thèmes pour le Piano, a new recording compiling piano, flute and cello arrangements for several of Georges Delerue's themes. The themes come from thirteen films, seven of which were directed by de Broca, to whom a special dedication is made. Details online.
- From 2011, the French label Music Box Records reissued two original motion picture soundtracks for de Broca films: Incorrigible (L'Incorrigible) (music by Georges Delerue) and The Gypsy (La Gitane) (music by Claude Bolling).

== Award ==
- 1960: Philippe de Broca received the Silver Bear Extraordinary Jury Prize at the Berlin Film Festival for Playing at Love (Les Jeux de l'amour).
