= The Joker (1960 film) =

- Original title French poster
- Directed by: Philippe de Broca
- Written by: Philippe de Broca; Daniel Boulanger
- Produced by: Claude Chabrol; Roland Nonin
- Starring: Jean-Pierre Cassel; Anouk Aimée
- Cinematography: Jean Penzer
- Edited by: Laurence Méry-Clark
- Music by: Georges Delerue
- Distributed by: Les Films Fernand Rivers, Guamont
- Release date: July 1960
- Running time: 88 minutes
- Country: France
- Language: French

The Joker (French: Le Farceur) is a 1960 French comedy film directed by Philippe de Broca.

== Plot ==
Edouard Berlon is a young, incorrigible seducer who moves very lightly from one affair to the next. He meets Helene Larouch, a woman married to André, a rich financier who is very busy with his affairs, leaving her in an emotionally arid life. Initially Helene resists Edouard's wooing, but as she gets to know his lively character, his eccentric lifestyle and his very unusual family environment, including his old uncle Théodose, his brother Pilou, servat Olga, some infants, and a few stray dogs, she lets herself become seduced. Their relation, however, turns out to be an ephemeral one as Edouard is busy seducing another woman.

== Cast ==
- Anouk Aimée as Helene Larouch
- Jean-Pierre Cassel as Edouard Berlon
- Pierre Palau as Théodose
- Geneviève Cluny as Pilou Berlon
- Georges Wilson as Guillaume Berlon
- Anne Tonietti as Olga
- François Maistre as André Laroche
- Jean-Pierre Rambal as Paul
- Liliane Patrick as Solange
- Irène Chabrier as Aline, servant at the inn

== Release ==
The film had its premiere at the Locarno Film Festival in July 1960, but was not released commercially until 20 January 1961 in France and 7 August 1961 in New York. During the 2012 Cannes Film Festival, the film was presented with other classics at the Cinéma de la Plage, a non-competitive part of the official selection that is open to the public. In 12 November 2013, the film was presented at the Cinémathèque québécoise, Montréal.

== Critical response ==
The film has been described as "a lot of genial fun" as the plot evolves. It also has been described as whimsical and in parts "nutty" for the eccentric lifestyle of the hero and his family. French critics, on the other hand, find subtle qualities in the presentation of the characters as uncle Théodose is described as "an original, old uncle" as well as poetic connotations in the overall work.
