= Georges Delerue =

French composer (1925–1992)

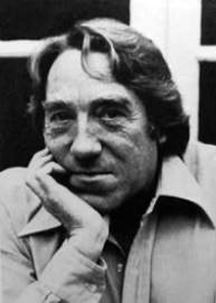
- Georges Delerue

Background information
- Born: 12 March 1925; Roubaix, France
- Died: 20 March 1992 (aged 67) Los Angeles, California, U.S.
- Genres: Film scores, classical
- Occupation: Composer
- Instruments: Piano, clarinet
- Years active: 1947–1992
- Website: www.georges-delerue.com

Georges Delerue (12 March 1925 – 20 March 1992; [ʒɔʁʒ dɛlʁy]) was a French composer who composed more than 350 scores for cinema and television. Delerue won numerous important film music awards, including an Academy Award for A Little Romance (1979), three César Awards (1979, 1980, 1981), two ASCAP Awards (1988, 1990), and one Gemini Award for Sword of Gideon (1986). He was also nominated for four additional Academy Awards for Anne of the Thousand Days (1969), The Day of the Dolphin (1973), Julia (1977), and Agnes of God (1985), four additional César Awards, three Golden Globe Awards, and one Genie Award for Black Robe (1991).

The French newspaper Le Figaro named him "the Mozart of cinema". Delerue was the first composer to win three consecutive César Awards: for Get Out Your Handkerchiefs (1978), Love on the Run (1979), and The Last Metro (1980). Delerue was named Commander of Arts and Letters, one of France's highest honours.

== Early life and education ==
Delerue was born on 12 March 1925 in Roubaix, France, to Georges Delerue and Marie Lhoest. He was raised in a musical household; his grandfather led an amateur chorale group and his mother sang and played piano at family gatherings. By the age of 14, he was playing clarinet at the local music conservatory. In 1940, he was forced to abandon his studies at the Turgot Institute in order to work at a factory to help support his family. He continued playing clarinet with local bands, eventually transitioning to piano under the instruction of Madame Picavet-Bacquart. He studied Bach, Mozart, Beethoven, Chopin, and Grieg, and was particularly inspired by Richard Strauss. After a long convalescence, having been diagnosed with scoliosis, Delerue decided to become a composer.

In 1945, following his studies at the Roubaix conservatory, Delerue was accepted into the Conservatoire de Paris, where he studied fugue with Simone Plé-Caussade and composition with Henri Büsser. To help support himself, he took jobs playing at dances, baptisms, marriages, and funerals—even performing jazz in the piano bars near the Paris Opera.

In 1947, he received an honorable mention for the Rome Prize, and the next year he won the Second Grand Rome Prize. That year at the Theater Festival of Avignon, Delerue conducted a performance of Scheherazade. In the 1949 Rome Prize competition, he won the First Second Grand Prize, and the First Prize for Composition. He began writing stage music during the late 1940s, including for the Théâtre National Populaire, Comédie-Française and the company of Jean-Louis Barrault. He also became friends with Maurice Jarre and Pierre Boulez.

== Career ==
By the early 1950s, Delerue was composing music for short films and writing theatrical music for the Théâtre Babylone and the Opéra Comique. He began collaborating with Boris Vian on a number of projects during this time, including theatrical adaptations of The Snow Knight and The Builders of Empire, an oratorio A Regrettable Incident, and a ballet The Barker. In 1952, Delerue began directing the orchestra of the Club d'Essai for French National Radio and Television, and scored his first television drama, Princes du sang. In 1954, he wrote his first compositions for historical spectacles of light and sound, Lisieux and The Liberation of Paris. In 1955, he composed his Concert Symphony for Piano and Orchestra, and on 31 January 1957 his opera The Snow Knight premiered at Nancy and was a popular success. In 1959, he composed his first score for a feature film, Le bel âge.

His career was diverse and he composed frequently for major art house directors, most often François Truffaut (including Jules and Jim), but also for Jean-Luc Godard's film Contempt (Le Mépris), and for Alain Resnais, Louis Malle, and Bernardo Bertolucci, besides later working on several Hollywood productions, including Oliver Stone's Platoon and Salvador. Another director Delerue composed for was Ken Russell, who in return filmed a BBC documentary about Delerue entitled Don't Shoot the Composer (1966).

He composed the music for Flemming Flindt's ballet, Enetime (The Lesson), based on Ionesco's play, The Lesson. During his 42-year career, he composed scores for 200 feature movies, 125 short ones, 70 TV films, and 35 TV serials. The soundtrack for war docudrama by Pierre Schoendoerffer, Diên Biên Phu (1992), was one of his late notable works.

Delerue also made cameo appearances in La nuit americaine and Les deux anglaises et le continent.

== Collaborations with Jack Clayton ==
Delerue composed the music for five of the films made by the noted British director Jack Clayton. Their first collaboration was The Pumpkin Eater (1964), followed by Our Mother's House (1967). In 1982 they reunited for the Disney film version of Ray Bradbury's Something Wicked This Way Comes, but the production was fraught with problems. Unhappy with the sinister tone of Clayton's original cut, the studio took control of the film, and held it back from release for more than a year. They reportedly spent an additional $5 million on re-editing the film, cutting some scenes and replacing them with newly shot footage, with the aim of making the film more commercial and "family-friendly". To Delerue's great disappointment, Disney also insisted on the removal of his original music (which was considered "too dark"), and replaced it with a new, "lighter" score by American composer James Horner. Speaking later about the rejection of his score, Delerue said: "It was extremely painful ... because it was probably the most ambitious score I wrote in the United States." Delerue's music for the film was only available to collectors in low-quality bootleg copies until 2011, when Disney authorised the release of approximately 30 minutes of music, sourced from Delerue's personal tape copy of the score (which originally ran for more than an hour). This was issued by Universal France (along with Delerue's music for the 1991 film Regarding Henry) in a limited edition of 3000 CDs, as the inaugural release of its "Ecoutez le Cinema!" soundtrack series. Despite this disappointment, Delerue worked with Clayton twice more, on his last feature film, The Lonely Passion of Judith Hearne (1987), and on Clayton's final screen project, a feature length BBC TV adaptation of Muriel Spark's Memento Mori (1992), which aired just a month after Delerue's death.

== Death ==
Georges Delerue died on 20 March 1992 from a heart attack in Los Angeles, eight days after his 67th birthday, just after recording the last cue for the soundtrack to Rich in Love. He is buried in Forest Lawn Memorial Park Cemetery in Glendale, California.

Delerue married for the last time in 1984; he had a daughter from a previous marriage.

== Filmography ==
Georges Delerue composed the musical scores for 351 feature films, television movies, television series, documentaries, and short films. The following is a list of feature films for which he composed the music.

- Le mystère du quai de Conti (1950)
- Ingénieurs de la mer (1951)
- Les techniciens en pompons rouges (1952)
- L'aventure et ses Terras-Nuevas (1952)
- Berre, cité du pétrole (1953)
- Le largage à six heures du matin (1953)
- Madagascar (1954)
- La grande cité d'Angkor (1954)
- Au rythme du siècle (1954)
- Au pays de Guillaume le Conquérant (1954)
- Première croisière (1954)
- Regards sur l'Indochine (1954)
- Âmes d'argile (1955)
- Sur l'Arroyo (1956)
- La rue chinoise (1956)
- Tu enfanteras sans douleur (1956)
- Marche française (1956)
- Girl in His Pocket (1957)
- Fleuve invisible (1959)
- Images pour Baudelaire (1959)
- Hiroshima mon amour (1959)
- Women and War (1960)
- Une question d'assurance (1960)
- Le bel âge (1960)
- A Mistress for the Summer (1960)
- The Big Risk (1960)
- Marche ou crève (1960)
- The Love Game (1960)
- Love and the Frenchwoman (1960)
- Shoot the Piano Player (1960)
- Sahara Year Four (1961)
- The Joker (1961)
- Love Play (1961)
- Five Day Lover (1961)
- La mort de Belle (1961)
- The Long Absence (1961)
- Le bonheur est pour demain (1961)
- The Nina B. Affair (1961)
- The Season for Love (1961)
- Par-dessus le mur (1961)
- Jules and Jim (1962)
- Cartouche (1962)
- Operation Gold Ingot (1962)
- Le petit garçon de l'ascenseur (1962)
- Le monte-charge (1962)
- Love at Twenty (1962)
- Crime Does Not Pay (1962)
- La dénonciation (1962)
- Thank You, Natercia (1963)
- Nunca pasa nada (1963)
- Till the End of the World (1963)
- The Man from Chicago (1963)
- L'Immortelle (1963)
- Rififi in Tokyo (1963)
- The Reluctant Spy (1963)
- Magnet of Doom (1963)
- Portuguese Vacation (1963)
- Contempt (1963)
- Le journal d'un fou (1963)
- Chair de poule (1963)
- That Man from Rio (1964)
- Trouble Among Widows (1964)
- Greed in the Sun (1964)
- The Soft Skin (1964)
- Laissez tirer les tireurs (1964)
- French Dressing (1964)
- Salad by the Roots (1964)
- The Pumpkin Eater (1964)
- Le gros coup (1964)
- The Other Woman (1964)
- The Unvanquished (1964)
- Male Companion (1964)
- Lucky Jo (1964)
- That Tender Age (1964)
- Mata Hari, Agent H21 (1964)
- Mona, l'étoile sans nom (1965)
- The Sucker (1965)
- The Uninhibited (1965)
- L'amour à la chaîne (1965)
- Rapture (1965)
- Killer Spy (1965)
- Up to His Ears (1965)
- Viva Maria! (1965)
- The Moment of Peace (1965)
- A Man for All Seasons (1966)
- King of Hearts (1966)
- The Sunday of Life (1967)
- The 25th Hour (1967)
- The Two of Us (1967)
- Our Mother's House (1967)
- Thursday We Shall Sing Like Sunday (1967)
- Oscar (1967)
- A Little Virtuous (1968)
- The Hotshots (1968)
- Interlude (1968)
- The High Commissioner (1968)
- The Erasers (1969)
- The Brain (1969)
- The Devil by the Tail (1969)
- Hibernatus (1969)
- Women in Love (1969)
- A Walk with Love and Death (1969)
- Anne of the Thousand Days (1969)
- Happy He Who Like Ulysses (1970)
- Give Her the Moon (1970)
- The Conformist (1970)
- Promise at Dawn (1970)
- Malpertuis: The Legend of Doom House (1971)
- Reckonings Against the Grain (1971)
- Mira (1971)
- The Most Gentle Confessions (1971)
- The Horsemen (1971)
- Two English Girls (1971)
- The Artless One (1972)
- Dear Louise (1972)
- Such a Gorgeous Kid Like Me (1972)
- Somewhere, Someone (1972)
- Day for Night (1973)
- The Day of the Jackal (1973)
- Love Comes Quietly (1973)
- The Day of the Dolphin (1973)
- Alien Thunder (1974)
- La femme de Jean (1974)
- The Slap (1974)
- That Most Important Thing: Love (1975)
- Incorrigible (1975)
- Femmes fatales (1976)
- Forget Me, Mandoline (1976)
- Nevermore, Forever (1976)
- Police Python 357 (1976)
- Boomerang (1976)
- The Game of Solitaire (1976)
- The Big Operator (1976)
- Julie Gluepot (1977)
- Julia (1977)
- Focal Point (1977)
- Get Out Your Handkerchiefs (1978)
- Dear Inspector (1978)
- Va voir maman, papa travaille (1978)
- La petite fille en velours bleu (1978)
- Le cavaleur (1979)
- Love on the Run (1979)
- Mijn vriend (1979)
- A Little Romance (1979)
- An Almost Perfect Affair (1979)
- The Black Sheep (1979)
- First Voyage (1980)
- Willie & Phil (1980)
- The Last Metro (1980)
- Richard's Things (1980)
- Broken English (1981)
- Documenteur (1981)
- Rich and Famous (1981)
- Garde à Vue (1981)
- La vie continue (1981)
- True Confessions (1981)
- The Woman Next Door (1981)
- Josepha (1982)
- A Little Sex (1982)
- Guy de Maupassant (1982)
- La Passante du Sans-Souci (1982)
- Partners (1982)
- The Escape Artist (1982)
- Something Wicked This Way Comes (1982) - unused
- L'africain (1983)
- The Black Stallion Returns (1983)
- Man, Woman and Child (1983)
- Exposed (1983)
- One Deadly Summer (1983)
- Confidentially Yours (1983)
- Liberty Belle (1983)
- Silkwood (1983)
- Love Thy Neighbor (1984)
- Le Bon Plaisir (1984)
- Femmes de personne (1984)
- Les Morfalous (1984)
- Agnes of God (1985)
- Maxie (1985)
- A Time to Live (1985)
- Salvador (1986)
- Conseil de famille (1986)
- Touch and Go (1986)
- Descente Aux Enfers (Descent Into Hell) (1986)
- Crimes of the Heart (1986)
- Platoon (1986)
- My Letter to George (1986)
- Sword of Gideon (1986)
- A Man in Love (1987)
- Maid to Order (1987)
- Tours du Monde, Tours du Ciel, documentary series (1987)
- The Pick-up Artist (1987)
- The Lonely Passion of Judith Hearne (1987)
- The House on Carroll Street (1988)
- Chouans! (1988)
- Biloxi Blues (1988)
- A Summer Story (1988)
- To Kill a Priest (1988)
- Memories of Me (1988)
- Heartbreak Hotel (1988)
- Paris by Night (1988)
- Twins (1988)
- Beaches (1988)
- Her Alibi (1989)
- La Révolution française (1989)
- The Spirit (1989)
- Seven Minutes (1989)
- Steel Magnolias (1989)
- Joe Versus the Volcano (1990)
- A Show of Force (1990)
- Slacker (1990)
- Mister Johnson (1990)
- Cadence (1990)
- American Friends (1991)
- La reine blanche (1991)
- Black Robe (1991)
- Curly Sue (1991)
- Without Warning: The James Brady Story (1991)
- The Josephine Baker Story (1991)
- Dien Bien Phu (1992)
- Céline (1992)
- Man Trouble (1992)
- Rich in Love (1992)

- Memento Mori1 (1992) (A BBC drama)

== Discography ==
The following is a select list of albums of the music of Georges Delerue.

- Jules et Jim (1961)
- Cent Mille Dollars Au Soleil (1963)
- Il Conformista (1970)
- Paul Gauguin (1974)
- A Little Romance (1979)
- The Borgias (1981)
- Vivement Dimanche! (1981)
- La Femma d'A Cote (1983)
- Agnes of God (1984)
- The London Sessions (1990)
- Delerue: Suite Cinématographique, Tirée des films (1990)
- Les Deux Anglaises et le Continent (1991)
- Black Robe (1992)
- Diên Biên Phú (1992)
- Man Trouble (1992)
- Rich in Love (1992)
- Like a Boomerang (1993)
- Georges Delerue: Music from the Films of François Truffaut (1997)
- Comme un Boomerang (2000)
- Joe Versus the Volcano (2002)
- True Confessions (2005)
- An Almost Perfect Affair (2006)
- The Pick-Up Artist (2006)
- The Cinema of François Truffaut (2007)
- Promise at Dawn (2008)
- Georges Delerue: Jules et Jim; Les Deux Anglaises (2008)
- Partitions Inedites (2011)

== Other compositions ==
- Operas: Ariane; Le chevalier de neige; Une regrettable histoire; Médis et Alyssio
- Ballets: L'emprise; Conte cruel; La leçon; Les trois mousquetaires
- Diptyque for flute
- Duos pour flûte et guitare
- Concerto pour Trombone
- Visages (for guitar)
- Mosaique (for guitar)
- Graphic (for guitar)
- Antienne 1 for violin and piano
- Concerto de l'Adieu
- Aria et Final
- Mouvements pour instruments à percussion et piano
- Stances for cello and piano
- Violin Sonata
- Récit et choral for trumpet and organ
- Madrigal, for solo trombone and five trombones (published 1999)
- Fanfares Pour Tous Les Temps for brass
- Cérémonial (for brass ensemble)
- Four Pieces for Clarinet and Piano
- Prélude & danse for oboe and piano
- String Quartet No. 1
- String Quartet No. 2

== Awards and nominations ==
- 1969 Academy Award Nomination for Best Original Score (Anne of the Thousand Days)
- 1969 Golden Globe Award Nomination for Best Original Score (Anne of the Thousand Days)
- 1970 BAFTA Award Nomination for Film Music (Women in Love)
- 1973 Academy Award Nomination for Best Original Score (The Day of the Dolphin)
- 1973 Golden Globe Award Nomination for Best Original Score (The Day of the Dolphin)
- 1977 Academy Award Nomination for Best Original Score (Julia)
- 1977 César Award Nomination for Best Music Written for a Film (Police Python 357)
- 1979 Academy Award for Best Original Score (A Little Romance) Won
- 1979 César Award for Best Music Written for a Film (Get Out Your Handkerchiefs) Won
- 1979 Golden Globe Award Nomination for Best Original Score (A Little Romance)
- 1979 BAFTA Award Nomination for Film Music (Julia)
- 1980 César Award for Best Music Written for a Film (Love on the Run) Won
- 1981 César Award for Best Music Written for a Film (The Last Metro) Won
- 1983 César Award Nomination for Best Music Written for a Film (La passante du Sans-Souci)
- 1984 César Award Nomination for Best Music Written for a Film (One Deadly Summer)
- 1985 Academy Award Nomination for Best Original Score (Agnes of God)
- 1988 ASCAP Award for Top Box Office Film (Twins) Won
- 1990 ASCAP Award for Top Box Office Film (Platoon) Won
- 1991 Genie Award for Best Original Score (Black Robe) Won
- 1992 Australian Film Institute Award for Best Original Music Score (Black Robe) Won
- 1993 César Award Nomination for Best Music Written for a Film (Dien Bien Phu)
