= Daniel Boulanger =

French novelist, playwright, poet and screenwriter

Daniel Boulanger (24 January 1922 – 27 October 2014) was a French novelist, playwright, poet and screenwriter.

== Biography ==
Boulanger has also played secondary roles in films and was a member of the Académie Goncourt from 1983 until his death. He was born in Compiègne, Oise.

Boulanger is most known for his roles as the detective hunting down Jean-Paul Belmondo in Jean-Luc Godard's Breathless, the neighbor of Claude Jade and Jean-Pierre Léaud in François Truffaut's Bed and Board and as a comical gangster in Shoot the Piano Player, another Truffaut feature. On 27 October 2014, Boulanger died at the age of 92.

== Filmography ==
- 1960: À bout de souffle (by Jean-Luc Godard) - Police Inspector Vital
- 1960: Les Jeux de l'amour (by Philippe de Broca) - Un danseur au cabaret / l'homme à la Citroën
- 1960: Le Farceur (by Philippe de Broca) - Un musicien (uncredited)
- 1960: Tirez sur le pianiste (by François Truffaut) - Ernest
- 1961: L'Amant de cinq jours (by Philippe de Broca) (Writer)
- 1962: L'Œil du malin (by Claude Chabrol) - Policeman
- 1966: Le Roi de cœur (by Philippe de Broca) (Writer) - Le Colonel Helmut von Krack
- 1967: The Oldest Profession (Writer)
- 1968: La Mariée était en noir (by François Truffaut) - Delvaux
- 1970: Domicile conjugal (by François Truffaut) - Le voisin ténor
- 1970: Sortie de secours (by Roger Kahane)
- 1971: The Married Couple of the Year Two (by Jean-Paul Rappeneau) (Writer)
- 1971: The Deadly Trap (by René Clément) (Writer)
- 1974: Toute une vie (by Claude Lelouch) - The general
- 1976: Une femme fidèle (by Roger Vadim) (Writer)
- 1978: La Zizanie (by Claude Zidi) - Le directeur du Crédit Agricole (final film role)
- 1980: Le cheval d'orgueil (by Claude Chabrol) (Writer)

== Award and distinctions ==
- 1971 Prix de l'Académie française
- 1974 Prix Goncourt de la Nouvelle, Fouette, cocher !
- 1979 Prix Prince Pierre de Monaco
- 1983 llamado a l'Académie Goncourt
