= Alexandre Mnouchkine =

(Russian born) French film producer (1908-1993)

- Born: Alexandre Alexandrovich Mnouchkine; 10 February 1908; St. Petersburg, Russian Empire
- Died: 3 April 1993 (aged 85); Neuilly-sur-Seine, France
- Occupation: Film producer
- Spouses: Jane Hannen; Simone Renant (m. 1975)
- Children: Ariane Mnouchkine (daughter)

Alexandre Alexandrovich Mnouchkine (Russian: Алекса́ндр Алекса́ндрович Мну́шкин; 10 February 1908 – 3 April 1993) was a Russian-born French film producer.

He moved to Paris in 1925. After his entry into cinema in 1932, he created Les Films Ariane in 1945. Alexandre Mnouchkine married twice, the second time to the comedian Simone Renant. He is the father of Ariane Mnouchkine. In 1987 he was a member of the jury at the 15th Moscow International Film Festival.

== Selected filmography ==
He was the producer on 50 films, including:

- The Emigrant (1940)
- Convicted (1948)
- L'Aigle à deux têtes by Jean Cocteau (1948)
- The Cupid Club (1949)
- Julie de Carneilhan (1950)
- The Happy Man (1950)
- Fanfan la Tulipe by Christian-Jaque (1952),
- Madame du Barry (1954)
- Madelon (1955)
- Women's Club (1956)
- Les Gauloises bleues by Michel Cournot (1968),
- The Name of the Rose by Jean-Jacques Annaud (1986),
- 6 films directed by Claude Lelouch,
- 10 films directed by Philippe de Broca, including L'Homme de Rio and Dear Louise
- La Révolution française - episode "Les Années Lumière" by Robert Enrico.

=== Actor ===
- Le Voyou (1970)
- Touch and Go (1971) - L'homme en vélo-taxi (uncredited)
- L'aventure, c'est l'aventure (1972) - Davis (uncredited)
- Le Magnifique (1973) - Paramedic at the Back of Ambulance (uncredited)
- Illustrious Corpses (1976) - Pattos (uncredited)
- If I Had to Do It All Over Again (1976)
- Jupiter's Thigh (1980) - Hermann Von Blankenberg (uncredited)
- I Hate Actors (1986) - Zupelman
- Spirale (1987) - Gustav Stadler
- The African Woman (1990) - Andrej (final film role)

== Awards ==
- Honorary César award in 1982
