= Georges Dancigers =

French film producer (1908–1993)

Georges Dancigers (17 February 1908 Tukums, Russian Empire (now Latvia) – 1 November 1993 Neuilly-sur-Seine, France) was a Russian-born French film producer. His most notable film was Bertrand Blier's Get out your Handkerchief (1978), which won the Academy Award for Best Foreign Language Film. He was awarded an Honorary César award in 1982.

== Selected filmography ==
- Convicted (1948)
- The Cupid Club (1949)
- The Cape of Hope (1951)
- Madame du Barry (1954)
