= Tonie Marshall =

French actress (1951–2020)

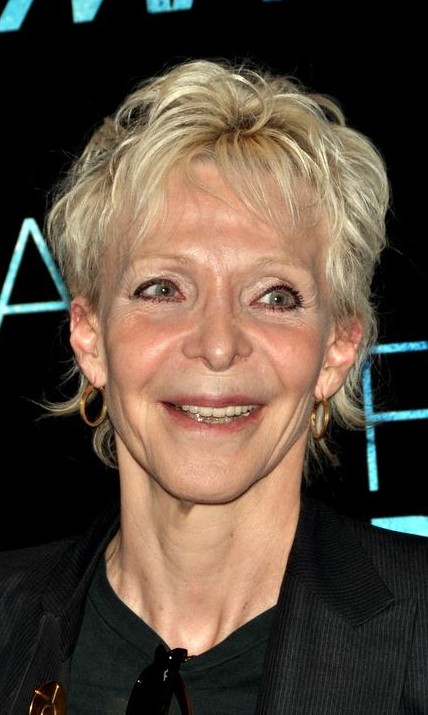
- Marshall in 2012
- Born: 29 November 1951; Neuilly-sur-Seine, France
- Died: 12 March 2020 (aged 68); Paris, France
- Occupations: Actress; film director; screenwriter
- Years active: 1971–2020
- Parents: William Marshall; Micheline Presle
- Relatives: Mike Marshall (half-brother); Sarah Marshall (niece)

Tonie Marshall (29 November 1951 – 12 March 2020) was a French-American film director, screenwriter and actress. In 2000, she became the first female director to win the César Award for her film Venus Beauty Institute.

== Life and career ==
Marshall was the daughter of American actor, director, and bandleader William Marshall and French actress Micheline Presle. She was also the aunt of model and actress Sarah Marshall, and the half-sister of actor Mike Marshall, son of the actress Michèle Morgan.

Before becoming a director, Tonie Marshall was an actress, first in drama and then in television and film, where she played several small parts in the 1970s and 1980s. As she recalles about her beginnings on-screen: "I was an actress because it was what seemed the more natural for me, but I was interested a lot in writing and production. I was quite afraid not to make it [directing films]. Because I was a little actress, that I did not attend a specialized school, that I did not have any technique". During her childhood, she also developed her experience of films thanks to the arthouse cinema of the Ursulines in the 5th arrondissement of Paris, near which she grew up.

After appearing in minor parts in several of Jacques Demy's films, including A Slightly Pregnant Man (1973) and La Naissance du Jour (1980), Marshall directed her first film, Pentimento (1990), offering the radio and television host Antoine de Caunes his first role in cinema.

In 1994, her film Pas très Catholique was selected as part of the 44th Berlin International Film Festival.

Tonie Marshall's 1999 film Venus Beauty Institute (Vénus beauté (Institut)) won four César Awards during the 2000 competition including Best Director, making her the first female filmmaker to receive this distinction. The César Academy also awarded Venus Beauty Institute with Best Film, Best Original Screenplay or Adaptation, as well as Most Promising Actress for Audrey Tautou, whose career was launched by the film.

This romantic comedy centers on the search for love and happiness of three employees of a Parisian beauty salon "Vénus Beauté Institut": Angèle (Nathalie Baye), Marie (Audrey Tautou), Samantha (Mathilde Seigner), and their manager Nadine (Bulle Ogier). Tonie Marshall's mother Micheline Presle also appears in the film where she plays the part of Aunt Maryse. In a 2001 interview for the film magazine Cinéaste, Tonie Marshall recalls the genesis of the film and how she was inspired by an existing beauty salon:

"My first idea was to write a part for Nathalie Baye because I wanted to do something with her that she had not done before: a woman with a very nice appearance, very banal, but who is, in fact, very mixed up and complicated. But I hadn't decided what she would do for a living in the film. Then one day I was passing by a small beauty salon on my street - the light was pink and there was a girl, a beautician I suppose, dressed in pink; and she was closing the shop very, very slowly. Her movement, absolutely like she was dancing, but very slowly, struck me as being an entirely cinematic image. I went back to this beauty parlor as a customer, and when I was there I heard so many incredible things."

Tonie Marshall has been mostly influenced by Jacques Demy's films throughout her career, the most famous ones being The Umbrellas of Cherbourg (1964) and The Young Girls of Rochefort (1967). Venus Beauty emerged from this influence, as well as an additional source of inspiration: the French film Belle de Jour (1964) directed by Luis Buñuel and starring Catherine Deneuve.

In 2002 her film Au plus près du Paradis was nominated for the Golden Lion Award as best film at the Venice Film Festival.

Marshall was a signatory of the "Free Roman Polanski" petition following film director Roman Polanski's arrest in Switzerland in 2009, which read: "We demand the immediate release of Roman Polanski. Film-makers in France, in Europe, in the United States and around the world are dismayed by this decision… It seems inadmissible to them that an international cultural event, paying homage to one of the greatest contemporary film-makers, is used by police to apprehend him.”

In 2017, Marshall released Number One (also released as Woman Up! in the UK and the US), her last feature film, which is based on her conversation with various female corporate executives. The film relates the story of Emmanuelle Blachey (Emmanuelle Devos), an engineer who tries to reach the manager position in a company with the help of her female counterparts and despite the misogynistic atmosphere that rules over the firm.

On March 12, 2020, she died from lung cancer at the age of 68.

=== Activism ===
Although Tonie Marshall would not label herself as a feminist, many of her films involve an underlying fight against sexism, especially the later ones including Number One in which she overtly advocates gender equality in the professional sphere.

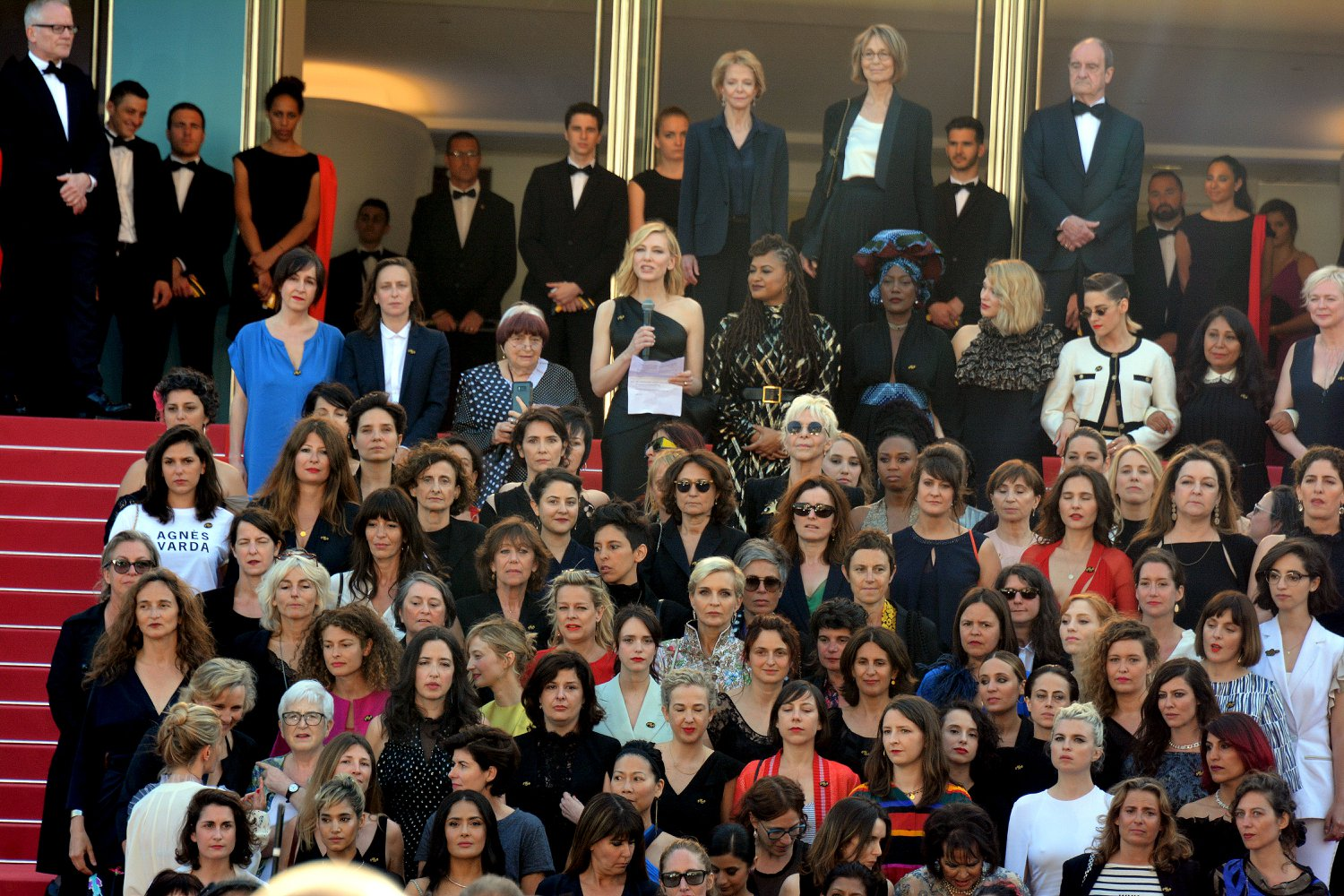
Protest for gender equality in the film industry during the 2018 Cannes Festival

Off-set, she was one of the members of the French 50/50 Collective, founded in 2018 and which promotes gender diversity and equality in the film industry. The same year, she also joined the Fondation des femmes, founded in March 2016, which aims to raise funds for feminist organizations. During the 2018 César Awards Ceremony and in association with the foundation, Tonie Marshall participated in the #MaintenantOnAgit movement as part of which she called diverse personalities to wear a white ribbon as a symbol of the struggle against violence against women.

In an interview given to the French newspaper La Tribune in 2017 for the release of Number One, Marshall addressed her young female spectators, saying: "For the world to evolve, and to reach true modernity, 45-50% of women should get to decision-making professional positions in order to finally experience a different organization in work and business. If I could help with it, I would be very glad. And if people who watched my film get out of the theater telling themselves "this made me want the same", it is an absolute joy."

In 2001, Marshall was asked a question about the role played by women filmmakers in France, to which she answered: "Toscan du Plantier, the president of Unifrance, says that French cinema will be saved by women. This may be just a formule, pretty words, I don't know. But I do think that maybe the way we shoot a scene of two people making love is pretty different."

== Work ==
=== Filmography (films and TV) ===
Year	Title	Role	Notes
1970	Les Saintes chéries	Actress	TV series (1 episode) Created by Nicole de Buron and directed by Jean Becker
1971	Les Dossiers du professeur Morgan	Actress	TV series (1 episode)
1971	Un enfant dans la ville	Actress	TV film Directed by Pierre Sisser
1971	Côté cour, côté champs	Actress	Short; Directed by Guy Gilles
1972	What a Flash!	Actress	Directed by Jean-Michel Barjol
1973	L'Oiseau rare	Actress	Directed by Jean-Claude Brialy
1973	A Slightly Pregnant Man	Actress	Directed by Jacques Demy
1975	Une Suédoise à Paris	Actress	TV series (1 episode); Directed by Patrick Saglio
1975	Vous ne l'emporterez pas au Paradis	Actress	Directed by François Dupont-Midy
1975	La fleur des pois	Actress	TV film Directed by Raymond Rouleau
1976	Les Cinq Dernières Minutes	Actress	TV series (1 episode); Directed by Claude Loursais
1976	Mords pas, on t'aime	Actress	Directed by Yves Allégret
1976	Le Cheval évanoui	Actress	TV film Directed by Alain Dhénaut
1976	Les Infidèles	Actress	TV film Directed by Alain Dhénaut
1977	Au théâtre ce soir	Actress	TV series (1 episode); Directed by Pierre Sabbagh
1978	Le Mutant	Actress	TV mini-series Directed by Bernard Toublanc-Michel
1978	Les Deux élèves préférés du professeur Francine Brouda	Actress	Short; Directed by Danièle Dubroux
1979	Les Amours de la belle époque	Actress	TV series (1 episode) Directed by René Lucot
1979	Rien ne va plus	Actress	Directed by Jean-Michel Ribes
1980	Cinéma 16	Actress	TV series (1 episode); Directed by Eric Le Hung
1980	Tout dépend des filles	Actress	Directed by Pierre Fabre
1980	Les Sous-doués	Actress	Directed by Claude Zidi
1980	La Naissance du jour	Actress	TV film Directed by Jacques Demy
1981	Les Amours des années folles	Actress	TV series (1 episode); Directed by Marion Sarraut
1981	Le Petit théâtre d'Antenne 2	Actress	TV series (1 episode); Directed by Michel Treguer
1981	Les Dossiers éclatés	Actress	TV series (1 episode); Directed by Alain Boudet
1981	La Gueule du loup	Actress	Directed by Michel Léviant
1981	Les Roses de Dublin	Actress	TV mini-series Directed by Lazare Iglesis
1982	Merci Bernard	Actress	TV series (10 episodes); Directed by Jean-Michel Ribes
1983	Archipel des amours	Actress	Directed by Jacques Davila
1983	Elle voulait faire du cinéma	Actress	TV film Directed by Caroline Huppert
1984	Paris vu par... vingt ans après	Actress	Sketches Film (1 sketch) Directed by Frédéric Mitterrand
1984	Batailles	Actress	TV movie Directed by Jean-Michel Ribes
1985	Classique	Actress	Short; Directed by Christian Vincent
1986	Qui trop embrasse...	Actress	Directed by Jacques Davila
1986	Beau temps mais orageux en fin de journée	Actress	Directed by Gérard Frot-Coutaz
1986	Le Tiroir secret	Actress	TV mini-series Directed by Nadine Trintignant, Roger Gillioz, Michel Boisrond & Édouard Molinaro
1987	Coeurs croisés	Actress	Directed by Stéphanie de Mareuil
1989	Pentimento	Director / Writer	
1989	Palace	Actress	TV series (1 episode); Directed by Jean-Michel Ribes
1990	Le Champignon des Carpathes	Actress	Directed by Jean-Claude Biette
1990	La Campagne de Cicéron	Actress	Directed by Jacques Davila
1992	Chasse gardée	Actress	Directed by Jean-Claude Biette
1993	Point d'orgue	Actress	TV movie Directed by Paul Vecchiali
1994	Not Very Catholic /Something Fishy	Director / Writer	Bergamo Film Meeting – Golden Rosa Camuna; Nominated – Berlin International Film Festival – Golden Bear
1994	3000 scénarios contre un virus	Director	TV series (1 episode)
1996	Pour rire!	Actress	Directed by Lucas Belvaux
1996	Citron amer	Actress	Short; Directed by Christiane Lack
1996	Enfants de salaud	Director / Writer	
1999	Venus Beauty Institute	Director / Writer	César Award for Best Director; César Award for Best Film; César Award for Best Original Screenplay or Adaptation; Cabourg Film Festival – Golden Swann
2000	Tontaine et Tonton	Director	TV film
2002	Au plus près du Paradis	Director / Writer	Nominated – Venice Film Festival – Golden Lion
2003	France Boutique	Director / Writer	
2004	Les Falbalas de Jean-Paul Gaultier	Director / Writer / Cinematographer	Documentary
2005	Vénus & Apollon	Director / Writer / Producer	TV series
2008	Musée haut, musée bas	Actress	Directed by Jean-Michel Ribes
2008	Passe-passe	Director / Writer / Producer	
2009	X Femmes	Director / Writer	TV series (1 episode)
2009	Accomplices	Producer	Directed by Frédéric Mermoud
2010	HH, Hitler à Hollywood	Actress	Directed by Frédéric Sojcher
2012	Nuts	Producer	Directed by Yann Coridian
2014	The Missionaries	Director / Writer / Producer	
2016	Moka	Producer	
2017	Number One / Woman Up!	Director	

=== Drama ===
Year	Title	Role	Notes
1973	Duos sur canapé	Actress	Written by Marc Camoletti Tournée Karsenty-Herbert
1975	Un jeu d'enfants	Actress	Written by Martin Walser Directed by Maurice Attias Théâtre Moderne
1976	Pour 100 briques t'as plus rien...	Actress	Written by Didier Kaminka Directed by Henri Garcin Théâtre La Bruyère
1979	Le Père Noel est une ordure	Actress	Written by members Le Splendid troupe Directed by Philippe Galland Le Splendid
1979	Essayez donc nos pédalos	Actress	Written by Alain Marcel
1983	Batailles	Actress	Written by Roland Topor, Jean-Michel Ribes Directed by Jean-Michel Ribes Théâtre de l'Athénée
1987	Crimes du coeur (Crimes of the Heart)	Actress	Written by Beth Henley Directed by François Bourgeat La Pépinière-Théâtre
2008	Batailles	Actress	Written by Roland Topor, Jean-Michel Ribes Directed by Jean-Michel Ribes Théâtre du Rond-Point
2011	L'Amour, la mort, les fringues	Actress	Written by Nora Ephron and Delia Ephron Directed by Danièle Thompson Théâtre Marigny

== Recognition ==
Marshall achieved a prominent role in the French film industry, dominated mainly by men. In her most notable film, Venus Beauty Institute, Marshall touched on the theme of finding love from a female perspective, and how it can fundamentally be more difficult because of how it strays from the traditional dynamic of courtship. She explained how "in a practical sense, it’s complicated to have abandon [oneself] into a man’s arms and, at the same time, stay very tough because you have to work…". This expresses the vulnerabilities women endure when heavily committing to relationships, similar to much of Demy's work, including The Umbrellas of Cherbourg and The Young Girls of Rochefort.

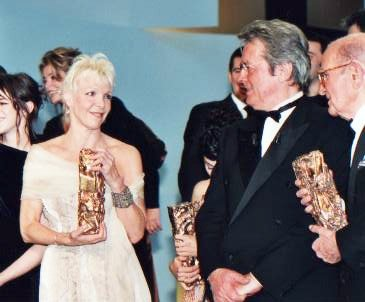
Tonie Marshall, Alain Delon and Georges Cravenne at the 2000 Césars ceremony

=== Honors ===
For her 1999 film Venus Beauty Institute :

- 25th César Awards
  - Best Film
  - Best Director
  - Best Original Screenplay or Adaptation
  - Most Promising Actress for Audrey Tautou

=== Nominations ===
For her 1999 film Venus Beauty Institute :

- 25th César Awards
  - Best Actress for Nathalie Baye
  - Best Supporting Actress for Bulle Ogier
  - Best Supporting Actress for Mathilde Seigner

== Additional sources ==
=== Books ===
Hottel, Ruth A. & Pallister, Janis L. (2011). Noteworthy Francophone Women Directors: A Sequel, Fairleigh Dickinson University Press.

Hughes, Alex & Williams James S. (2001). Gender and French Cinema, Berg.

Oscherwitz, Dayna & Higgins, Mary Ellen (2007). Historical Dictionary of French Cinema, The Scarecrow Press.

Rège, Philippe (2009). Encyclopedia of French Film Directors, The Scarecrow Press.

Rollet, Brigitte & Tarr, Carrie (2001). Cinema and the second sex: women's filmmaking in France in the 1980s and 1990s, Continuum.

=== Articles ===
- Champalaune, Mathieu (updated 16 March 2021). "300 personnalités du cinéma lancent le collectif "5050 pour 2020" pour l'égalité dans le cinéma", Les Inrockuptibles.
- Nougué, Emilie (visited 24 September 2022). "Les femmes de la semaine du 24 février au 2 mars 2018", Orange Tendances.
- West Joan M. (2001) "Venus Beauty Institute by Gilles Sandoz, Tonie Marshall, Mario Vernoux, Jacques Audiard", Cinéaste, Vol 26, No. 2, pp. 44-46.
- [Author unknown] (27 February 2018). "César 2018. Un ruban blanc pour lutter contre les violences faites aux femmes", Ouest France.
- [Author unknown] (22 August 2022). "Micheline Presle, l'audacieuse", CNC.

=== Documentaries and Interviews ===
"1972: Tonie Marshall, une jeune actrice | Archive INA", Institut National de l'Audiovisuel.

"Qui était Tonie Marshall? | Archive INA", Institut National de l'Audiovisuel.

"Tonie Marshall, réalisatrice de Numéro Une: "il faut des réseaux mixtes, pas uniquement féminins", Cadremploi.
