= Hello God =

- Directed by: William Marshall
- Written by: William Marshall
- Produced by: William Marshall; Errol Flynn
- Starring: Errol Flynn; Sherry Jackson; Joe Mazzucco
- Cinematography: USA: Paul Ivano; Henry Freulich; Italy: Leo Barboni
- Distributed by: Calvacade Films
- Release date: 1951
- Running time: 64 mins
- Country: United States
- Language: English

Hello God is a 1951 semi-documentary film with a pacifist message, starring Errol Flynn as a soldier.

For many years this was considered a lost film, but in 2013 a copy was discovered in the basement of the surrogate court of New York City. Two of seven cans of the movie were deteriorated beyond repair, but five survived and are now at the George Eastman House film archive for restoration.

== Plot ==
An unknown soldier (Errol Flynn) relates the story of four young men who are killed at the Battle of Anzio before they go into Heaven. As they approach Heaven, the soldiers ask to be accepted, although they arrived long before they were permitted to complete their lives on Earth.

== Cast ==
- Errol Flynn as the Man on Anzio Beach
- Sherry Jackson as the little Italian Girl
- Joe Mazzucco
- Armando Formica

== Production ==
Flynn made the film in partnership with William Marshall, an actor turned producer. The movie was originally entitled Before You Sleep Tonight and Flynn agreed to own a half interest in the film in exchange for a promissory note worth $25,000 signed in July 1949. Flynn made the movie in Italy in late 1949 on the way back from India, where he had been filming Kim. He worked on it for ten days and Flynn says his fee was $2,700 a day.

== Legal dispute ==
Flynn was unhappy with the quality of the final product and while making another film with Marshall in Paris, Adventures of Captain Fabian, he arranged for a friend of his, Charles Gross, to obtain the original negative of Hello God.

Marshall reconstructed the film using out-takes and additional footage shot in Santa Barbara. Marshall said at the time:

Flynn doesn't look his best in some of the rejected shots but we'll have to use them unless his man coughs up the good ones. I like Flynn as well as anybody, but in business he's pretty difficult. Somebody must be giving him bad advice. I haven't been able to get in touch with him lately... Everybody who has seen it says it's a wonderful picture and Flynn does things in it he has never done before. He prays to God and he cries on the beach at Anzio.

Flynn's manager at the time, Al Blum, insisted that Marshall would not get the footage back:

He represented to Flynn that he had a feature picture which needed only Flynn's appearance in the Italian scenes and a commentary by Flynn to complete it. But what he really has is a hodgepodge of junk – old newsreels, clips from other pictures, bad photography, no quality – it's just terrible. And, also, I'm a little afraid of its political aspects – although I don't want to make any positive charges. At all costs Flynn will block the release – by court action if necessary.

William Marshall then sued Flynn for collection on the promissory note which had been signed in exchange for a half interest in the film.

Flynn countersued, asking for the court to cancel the note and his partnership agreement with Marshall. He claimed that:

- When he entered into the agreement to make the film he did not know it would be detrimental to the public welfare in that it was of a pacifist nature and contrary to the policy of the United States and other countries opposed to Communist aggression;
- Marshall fraudulently represented that he had spent more than $50,000 on the production already, that the musical background had been scored and had been written by a conductor of distinction, and that the film could be expanded from being a documentary to a full-length drama;
- The film was of inferior quality because of the poor film stock used and poor sound recording. Flynn lost the case and in 1957 was ordered to pay $31,750 to William Marshall, plus $2,500 in legal costs. Marshall later claimed he had lent Flynn $180,000 when the actor was in financial trouble.

The movie was never released commercially, but a partial copy related to Marshall's legal troubles was discovered in 2013.
