= Robert Leslie Bellem =

American pulp-fiction writer (1902–68)

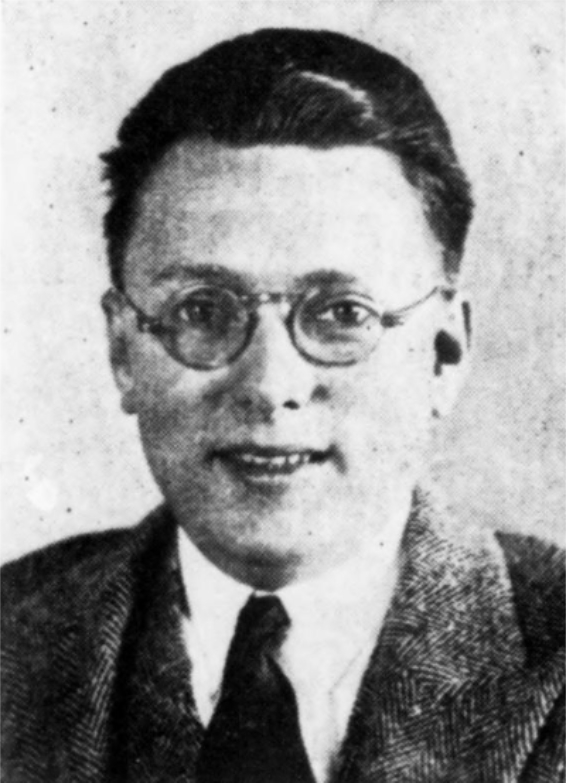
- Born: Robert Leslie Bellem; July 19, 1902; Philadelphia, Pennsylvania
- Died: April 1, 1968 (aged 65); Los Angeles, California
- Occupations: Journalist, pulp-fiction author, novelist, entrepreneur, TV screenwriter
- Known for: Dan Turner, Hollywood Detective
- Spouse: Blanche Marie Washburn (1904–69) (m. 1922–1968)

Robert Leslie Bellem was a prolific American pulp-fiction writer, best known for his creation of Dan Turner, Hollywood Detective.

== Background ==
An only child, Bellem grew up in Philadelphia, Pennsylvania, the son of Philadelphians James P. Bellem (b. ~1871) and Roberta May Black (~1876–1936). The couple divorced in 1908.

On becoming a writer, Bellem recounted: “Some guys are born to be hanged; others are predestined to a writing career. I’m one of the latter. Ever since I can remember, I’ve been putting words on paper because I can’t help it.”

His first known published works were a series of poems which appeared in the potpourri column The Chaffing Dish, in his hometown Evening Public Ledger. The first was “The Birdman” (March 22, 1919). Almost three dozen of these were published through February 1920.

The 1920 U.S. Census (recorded January 12) indicates that he was employed as “Clerk, Elec. Supplies”.

== Newspaperman ==
=== Philadelphia, Pennsylvania ===
The cessation of the Ledger poems may mark the time Bellem began newspaper employment. He worked for the Philadelphia Bulletin, details unknown.

=== Atlantic City, New Jersey ===
By mid-1920, Bellem had joined the staff of The Press of Atlantic City, duties unknown. The job lasted until late September 1920.

=== Tulsa, Oklahoma ===
Bellem left Atlantic City for a job at the Tulsa Tribune. He began as a clerk before becoming the manager of the classified advertising department. He later added literary and drama critic duties.

He vividly recalled the infamous Tulsa race massacre:

I was a special deputy for the first twenty-four hours [May 31, 1921] of that nasty affair—until the National Guard took charge. I heard my share of gunfire then; saw my share of sudden death. As a member of the Tulsa Tribune staff, some of the pix I snapped of that trouble were used by dailies all over the country.

For a brief period in early 1922, Bellem produced bylined articles and columns on the agricultural industry. His column was called Poultry-Garden-Livestocks Tips.

In the classified advertising department, he met Blanche “Bebe” Washburn. She left the paper in late 1921 and, about March 1922, moved to Albuquerque, New Mexico. In July, Bellem paid her a two-week visit. They wedded in Bellem’s Tulsa home on September 1, then honeymooned in Atlantic City on the way to his next newspaper job. They were married for life, and had no children.

When rattling off the long list of cities where he had worked newspaper jobs, Bellem often mentioned Albuquerque. His trip to New Mexico is the only known candidate time for when this might have happened.

=== Washington, D.C. ===
The new assignment was a job at the Washington Times/Herald. His bylined contributions were film and theater reviews, but in such a small number that they were a probably a sideline to his main responsibilities. His first review appeared in the October 30, 1922, edition. Bucking convention, he soon began to word his reviews as poems. For example, his review of the dramatic film Enemies of Women opens:

In The Enemies of Women there’s a wealth of color-play,
There’s a gamut of emotions, there’s a myriad of thrills;
From its gay, bizarre beginning to the fade-out drab and gray
It’s an epic of the pictures, mountain-high amid the hills!

The rhymed reviews only lasted a month. From July through November, 1923, he wrote about real estate issues, primarily in a column titled Realty. Thereafter, realty was abandoned and he returned to reviewing, this time adding vaudeville to his purview. He wrote dozens of reviews over the next two years, but still not enough to suggest that it was his primary occupation.

As in Tulsa, a historical event produced a noteworthy memory of his Washington years:

I helped cover Woodrow Wilson’s death [Feb 3, 1924] . . . I can still feel the bitter cold of that last night, with Cary Grayson, the ex-President’s personal physician, coming out of the somber Wilson residence on S street every hour to issue his grim reports.

Starting July 12, 1924, Bellem was editor of The Broadcast, a Saturday section of the paper devoted to radio, including content, market, and technical issues. His opening to an early editorial captured the excitement of the new technology:

There isn’t going to be any summer slump in radio in the National Capital. Campaign speeches are going to burn the air all summer. Political issues will be fought out via radio. At last candidates for high office will speak directly into the very homes of their prospective constituents. Other cities report record-breaking radio sales, and Washington is going to follow suit.

His last edited issue of The Broadcast was published October 17, 1925. The section continued without him and he left the paper. This marks his birth as a freelance author. During the ensuing year, he sold seven poems and four short stories to the burgeoning pulp magazine field. He was not to become a poet, though. Bellem would become best known as a writer of hardboiled detective stories, hinted at by two sales he made to Real Detective Tales and Mystery Stories (August and October, 1926).

Bellem traced his predilection for “action, gunplay, thrills” to a childhood experience:

I recall vividly one occasion when I was a grammar school kid in Philadelphia, my home town, where my dad was a railroad dick. I took him his sandwiches that evening and finally located him out in the freight yards. He spotted me coming; yelled for me to duck the hell out of the way. I wondered why.

I soon found out. From around the end of a freight car a gun blammed: “"Pow!"” and my dad staggered; grabbed at his side. Then he regained his balance! sprinted forward. He vanished on the other side of that freight car. Presently he reappeared with a freight-thief in tow. Dad had a bullet-crease across his ribs. Likewise he had the gun that had done the damage. He also had the trigger artist—and the trigger artist had a busted jaw. Dad always was handy with his fists.

To me from then on, cops were heroes; guys who fought through to victory with their brains backed up by knuckles were supermen.

Freelancing can’t have paid enough because he returned to the Herald after a year’s absence, staying another five months, October 1926 through March 1927, publishing 32 reviews. After that, he crossed the country to another city.

=== Fresno, California ===
From April 1927 through October 1928, Bellem was classified advertising manager of the The Fresno Bee, a “blissful period”, he called it, in the “hot somnolence of California’s San Joaquin Valley”.

On November 8, 1927, Bellem gave a talk on advertising to the local Optimists Club. It’s his first known public speaking appearance. He would make many more over a long career.

In Fresno, Bellem restarted his freelance fiction career. Of note was a short story in the October 1927 issue of Paris Nights, published in Philadelphia. It was Bellem’s first appearance in a class referred to by the writers’ journals as the “sex story magazines”. Doug Ellis, in an illustrated history of the genre, labeled them the “girlie pulps”. They were thin, saddle-stitched magazines featuring risqué stories and racy cover art. Often sold under the counter or in burlesque houses, the girlie pulps were the bane of censors.

Bellem soon followed up with a sale to Pep Stories (December 1927). The magazine was published in New York City by Frank Armer (1895–1965), who Ellis called the “king of the girlie pulps in the late 1920’s”. Bellem quickly wrote more stories for the Philly and New York sex-mag markets. As the author explained, he found that “he could get 2¢ a word for sex stuff and subsequently turned out bales of it”.

Still, it was not yet enough to make him self-supporting as a writer. Next up was a job a few miles east of fabled Hollywood.

=== Pasadena, California ===
In October 1928, Bellem was hired by the Pasadena Star-News. He repeated in his specialty, becoming manager of classified advertising. The Bellems would call Pasadena home for the rest of their lives.

On the side, Bellem was a regular correspondent for Editor & Publisher, writing about newspaper advertising issues, prominent newspaperman, and other topics. He had relationships with other trade journals: Timely Advertising, Washington Advertiser, and Classified Journal. He served as an officer in professional organizations, and spoke at meetings. For example, in 1930 as Secretary of the National Classified Advertising Association, he addressed the Long Beach Advertising Club.

=== Other locations ===
Bellem worked for newspapers in Miami and Memphis. The Memphis paper was the News-Scimitar.

No evidence has surfaced to pin down the dates. The largest block of unaccounted for time in the 1920s is his year’s absence from the Washington Herald (1925–26). Whether he remained in Washington or relocated is unknown.

== Pulp Writer ==
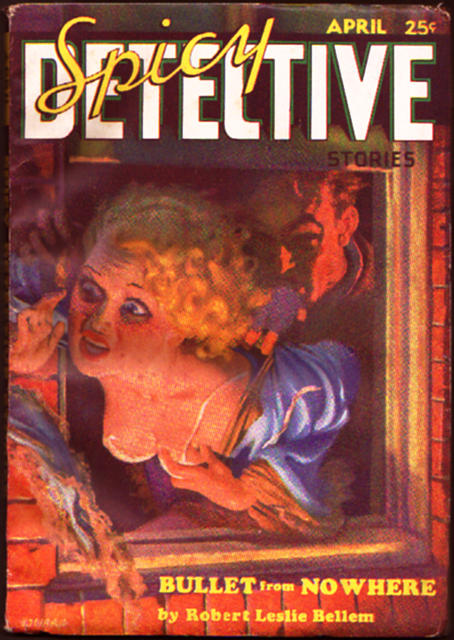
Spicy Detective Stories (April 1935) featuring "Bullet from Nowhere" by Robert Leslie Bellem

In October 1931, Bellem resigned from the Pasadena Star-News to become a full-time fiction-magazine writer. The new career was “the thing I’d wanted always”. His articles for Editor & Publisher ceased, as did his associations with professional organizations. He made a complete break from the newspaper business.

This was justified by the increasing success he’d had in getting publishing. From the time he published his first sex story in Paris Nights (October 1927) through the time he resigned, he published approximately 72 stories. Sixty-one of those were in the girlie pulps.

That field had changed in the same period. Publisher Frank Armer struggled with bad choices in the late ’20s and the onset of the Great Depression. Meanwhile, Harry Donenfeld (1893–1965), associated with Armer since 1924, jumped into the girlie pulp field in 1929. In 1932, Armer sold out his interests to Donenfeld, then, the following year, became his chief editor.

Of the 61 stories cited above, 46 were sold to either Armer or Donenfeld. From the start of Bellem’s full-time writing through the end of 1933, he sold approximately 38 stories, 33 in the girlie field, and 24 to the Donenfeld/Armer conglomeration.

In 1940, Bellem recalled when his career really took off:

A few years ago I was landing sporadic checks from magazines of which the majority lacked prestige. I happened to meet an editor whom I’d always greatly admired. He was about to launch a new string of pulps based on a brand new idea, and he invited me to submit some material to him.

Presumably, the editor was Frank Armer. The Bellems took long car trips about every two years, which included business in New York, visits with friends in the East and relatives in Tulsa. The time of this particular visit is assumed to be 1933, the year Bellem claimed to have created his famous detective Dan Turner, which would feature exclusively in Donenfeld/Armer magazines.

The “brand new idea” was a hybrid of the girlie pulps, which were more or less their own genre, with the standard pulp magazine genres of detective, adventure, western, and so forth. The resulting magazines were the Spicys, under the Culture Publications imprint, introduced to the market starting in 1934: Spicy Detective Stories, Spicy-Adventure Stories, Spicy Western Stories, and Spicy Mystery Stories. Armer described the slant of Spicy Detective, typical of the group:

while the stories are basically detective stories of the thrilling, sensational type, they must have a very strong sex element similar to those found in the various risqué magazines that are published; that is, there must be heavy petting sequences and provocative descriptions of the beautiful girls that get into all the trouble as a result of the crimes in the plot.

Bellem described his early attempts to meet the Spicy formula: “The ordure I turned out was foul beyond describing.” Nevertheless, he “took a chance and mailed it to the editor of that newly-launched outfit. He bought it. And I’ve been selling regularly to him ever since. In fact, he absorbs most of my output.”

Once embedded with Donenfeld/Armer (perhaps contractually), Bellem’s productivity skyrocketed. From 12 sales in 1933, he leapt to 52 in 1934; 26 were for Culture pulps, another 20 were for Donenfeld girlie pulps, while 5 went to rival girlie-pulp publishers and mainstream pulps. The following three years, 1935–37, tells the story of the complete embrace of publisher and author. Bellem averaged 140 sales a year. Eighty-four percent (51% Culture, 33% girlie) went to Donenfeld magazines.

But it was a hard job finishing a publishable story every 2.6 days for three years. “I have an office on the eighth floor of a downtown Pasadena office building where I put in eight hours every day,” he said in 1940, a year in which his output had dropped to 85 stories. He estimated he’d written a million words in 1935; his wife Bebe became his business manager. He expected to do 1.5 million in 1936, but he’d reached his upper limit.

Bellem appeared in the very first Spicy issue, the inaugural Spicy Detective (April 1934). He had two stories in the second issue (June). The second was written under the name Jerome Severs Perry. Whenever he had multiple stories in a single issue—he peaked at five—only one went under the Bellem name. (When he sold to rival girlie pulp mags, the stories were usually published under pennames.) He ultimately used over three-dozen pennames.

Featuring the first Dan Turner story, the June ’34 issue was a landmark. Said the creator: “About my sole claim to fiction fame is my Hollywood detective character, Dan Turner”. The Turners were written in the first person in a racy, slangy style, and suggested that Bellem was an infinite well of streetwise private-eye patter. His creative use of language comes as no surprise given that he began his writing life as a poet.

Once Bellem gained notice, he never concealed his productivity, or his use of numerous pennames. He picked up nicknames like “the wonder-boy of the pulps”. The money was good. The Bellems traveled, and had a second home built in Twentynine Palms, California in 1938.

After the three-year rush, Bellem’s output steadily dwindled. Though it varied up or down from year to year, from 1938–43, he averaged 77 sales a year; from 1944–46, 42 sales a year; and from 1947–50, 19 sales a year. Culture Publications, and its successor imprint Trojan Publishing, continued to add (or delete) titles. Bellem appeared in most of the male-oriented titles, e.g., Private Detective Stories. In 1942, the company honored him by creating the magazine Dan Turner, Hollywood Detective, each issue containing up to seven Dan Turner stories, all by Bellem. However, it only lasted 10 issues (January 1942–July 1943) before the title was shortened to Hollywood Detective. Readers could still get multiple tales of their favorite cracking-wise detective. With their January 1943 issues, the quartet of Spicy pulps was rebranded Speed, e.g. Spicy Detective Stories became Speed Detective. Bellem continued appearing in three of them, with Speed Western the exception.

The girlie pulps were mostly off the market by the end of the ’30s. Bellem stuck with the stragglers until the bitter end. His last appearance in the genre was a short story, “Abandoned Lady,” appropriately enough, in the January 1943 issue of Donenfeld’s The Stocking Parade. The pulps, as a whole, declined in number through the 1940s under competitive pressure from comic books, paperback novels, and, ultimately, television. Bellem’s mainstay, the Trojan pulps that he appeared in, were all off the market by the end of 1950. The last three Dan Turner stories were published in the October 1950 Hollywood Detective Magazine. That essentially marks the end of his pulp-writing career.

Some final numbers:

- 1255: Total pulp stories from 1926–50 (this is likely an undercount since some of Bellem’s output may have appeared under unidentified pennames; the highest known number that Bellem cited, in 1948, was an unrealistic 4,000 stories)
- 1050: Number of sales to the Donenfeld/Armer collective (84%); 797 (76%) went to Culture/Trojan pulps; 253 (24%) went to Donenfeld girlie pulps
- 308: Dan Turner stories
- 113: most used penname, Jerome Severs Perry; followed by Ellery Watson Calder, 93, and Harley L. Court, 50
- 16: Number of published stories in his best month (tie): September 1935, April 1936
- 14: Appearances by his second most used protagonist, Hollywood stuntman turned private dick, Nick Ransom

== Radio writer ==
Bellem wrote scripts for Creeps by Night, an anthology suspense series featuring Boris Karloff as narrator. It debuted on February 15, 1944. Produced in Hollywood, or the vicinity, the show relocated to New York, effective with the May 23 broadcast. Neither Karloff nor Bellem made the move to New York.

However, in late June the Bellems took a train cross-country to spend six weeks in New York and New Jersey. Robert spent a month of that time “preparing the audition scripts for a new radio detective series which is being readied for Autumn production on one of the major networks”. The fate of this show is unknown.

== Television writer ==
Following the demise of his last magazine market, Bellem made a seemingly seamless transition to television writing. Approximately three months after his last Dan Turners appeared on newsstands, his first scripted TV episode, “Dick Tracy and Flattop”, in the first season of Dick Tracy, aired on December 18, 1950. Bellem would be involved in 24 episodes before the show was cancelled in April 1951. According to the IMDb records, he wrote 13 episodes, suggested the story for 4, and provided “additional dialogue” on another 7. On four of the episodes, he collaborated with his Pasadena pulp-writing pal Todhunter Ballard.

Over the course of his TV writing career (1950–67), Bellem was involved in 146 known episodes for a variety of shows on all three major networks, ABC, CBS, NBC, plus syndication. Eighty-two percent of his episodes were in the detective/mystery/crime (52%) and western (30%) genres. On 112 of his 146 episodes, he was listed as main writer, often with a co-author; on the remaining 34 episodes he filled other roles.

He seldom wrote for a single show for a protracted period. Some of the highlights include Man Without a Gun (1957–59, western, 11 episodes as writer); Adventures of Superman (1956–58, comic book character, 8 episodes as writer, assisted by Whitney Ellsworth); Broken Arrow (1957–58, western, 6 episodes as writer); Front Page Detective (1951, 6 episodes as writer); The Lone Ranger (1956–57, western, 6 episodes as writer); Perry Mason (1961–64, mystery, 5 episodes as writer); 77 Sunset Strip (1963–64, drama, 4 episodes as writer); Johnny Midnight (1960, detective, 4 episodes as writer); Captain Midnight (1955–56, science fiction, 2 episodes as writer).

In the pulp magazines, he’d been a freelancer, albeit with a primary client who provided him a steady income—a career. The pattern of his TV work suggests a more traditional freelancer’s role, moving from employer to employer, filling in when needed, enjoying busy years and enduring fallow years.

== Comic writer ==
=== Comic features ===
The January 1943 Dan Turner, Hollywood Detective initiated a Dan Turner comic feature written by Bellem and illustrated by Culture/Trojan regular Adolphe Barreaux (1899–1985). When the magazine changed title to Hollywood Detective, the feature remained, appearing 49 total times through the August 1950 issue.

=== Belda Talking Komics ===
With the rise of the comic books, Bellem had seen his pulp-magazine markets—and income—dwindle. It inspired him to diversify into the new field with comic books that were more palatable to parents and would also help children learn to read. The resulting product was a “talking” comic book, a 20-page comic bundled with a phonograph record with the comic being real aloud accompanied by music and sound effects.

Bellem launched the Belda Record and Publishing Company with R. Glenn Davis, national advertising manager for The Pasadena Independent, and Laurence H. Mead, head of Perfection Plastic Products, a local manufacturer of phonograph records. “Belda” was derived from “Bellem” and “Davis”.

The company hired professional talent to create the finished products. The comic art was drawn by Melvin “Tubby” Millar (1900–80), a veteran animator of cartoons for Walt Disney and others. The comic books were written by Bellem, Frank Bonham, a member of Bellem’s circle of Pasadena pulp authors, and, in one instance, his voice actors. The vocal talent included veteran radio announcer Marvin Miller (1913–85) as narrator, and cartoon voice actors Daws Butler (1916–88) and Marian Richman (1922–56). Frank Hubbell, of the Santa Monia Symphony Orchestra, composed, arranged and conducted the scores. Robert Leslie, listed narrator on “Enchanted Toymaker” is assumed to be Bellem himself, perhaps necessary if the company was trimming budget.

A separate experimental product was Mysto-Magic, The Wizard Record. Each side of the record contained three sets of grooves, each with a separate nursery rhyme sung by “The Sparkettes”. Thus, it was a matter of chance which song would play when the needle was dropped. Side 1 had “Three Blind Mice,” “Where Has My Little Dog Gone?”, and “Baa Baa, Black Sheep”, while Side 2 had “Hickory Dickory Dock,” “Little Jack Horner”, and “Cock-a-Doodle-Doo?”

While Bellem claimed in 1948 that the records were “selling like hot cakes,” the company disappeared after 1950.

Belda Talking Komics Products
Catalog#	Product	Title	Format	Comic book author	Voices	Year
45-101	Talking Komics	Lonesome Octopus	7" 45 rpm	Bob Bellem	Marvin Miller	1946
101	Talking Komics	Lonesome Octopus	10" 78 rpm	Bob Bellem	Marvin Miller	1948
45-102	Talking Komics	Grumpy Shark	7" 45 rpm	Bob Bellem	Marvin Miller	1946
102	Talking Komics	Grumpy Shark	10" 78 rpm	Bob Bellem	Marvin Miller	1948
45-103	Talking Komics	Chirpy Cricket	7" 45 rpm	Frank Bonham	Tip Corning, Daws Butler	1946
103	Talking Komics	Chirpy Cricket	10" 78 rpm	Frank Bonham	Tip Corning, Daws Butler	1948
45-104	Talking Komics	Happy Grasshopper	7" 45 rpm	Frank Bonham	Tip Corning, Daws Butler	1946
105	Mysto-Magic	What Will It Play?	10" 78 rpm	n/a	The Sparkettes	1948
45-106	Talking Komics	Flying Turtle	7" 45 rpm	Daws Butler, Marian Richman	Daws Butler, Marian Richman	1947
106	Talking Komics	Flying Turtle	10" 78 rpm	Daws Butler, Marian Richman	Daws Butler, Marian Richman	1949
45-107	Talking Komics	Sleepy Santa	7" 45 rpm	Bob Bellem	Daws Butler, Marian Richman	1948
45-108	Talking Komics	3 Blind Mice	7" 45 rpm	Bob Bellem		1950
45-109	Talking Komics	Enchanted Toymaker	7" 45 rpm	Bob Bellem	Daws Butler, Marian Richman, Robert Leslie	1950

=== Comic books ===
Dan Turner comics from Hollywood Detective were reprinted in Trojan’s comic book Crime Smashers, which ran 15 issues from October 1950 to March 1953.

=== Eternity Comics ===
In 1991, Eternity Comics published four issues ("The Dark Star of Death", "Ace in the Hole", "Homicide Hunch", "The Star Chamber") of Dan Turner stories, adapted by John Wooley.

== Miscellany ==
=== Radio announcer ===
In 1930, Bellem spent two months subbing for the regular announcer on the Pasadena Star-News radio station, KPSN. In December, he added advertising manager of the station to his newspaper duties.

=== Movie extra ===
In 1941, Bellem claimed he’d had “a fling at Hollywood as a movie extra for Universal”. No details are available. The probable time for this would have been after he quit the Pasadena Star-News (1931) and before he started writing heavily for the pulps (1934).

=== Collaborations ===
Bellem was an occasional collaborator in his pulp writing. The notable example is the Jim Anthony novels he authored with Todhunter Ballard under the house name John Grange for Trojan’s Super-Detective pulp. Anthony appears to have been modeled after Doc Savage with an uptick in sex and violence. Bellem and Ballard wrote 10 of the 24 Anthony novels.

From 1931–34, Bellem co-authored a number of girlie pulp stories with Pasadena city chemist Frank E. Marks (1881–1959).

=== Magazines for servicemen ===
In 1943 and ’44, Bellem promoted the idea of contributing pulp magazines to the drives which collected books and magazines for servicemen. He spoke to local civic groups, collecting magazines on the spot. He insisted that pulps were most in demand.

=== Pasadena pulp writers circle ===
In the ’40s, Bellem belonged to a coterie of pulp writers living in Pasadena. The “dean” was John A. Saxon (1886–1947), veteran newspaperman (New York World, ca. 1909), long-time Pasadena Superior Court reporter, and veteran of the Spicys and many other pulps. The other members were western and detective writer George Armin Shaftel (1903–99) and western writer Frank Bonham (1914–88). They all had offices in “a nondescript office building on Arroyo Parkway” and held daily “coffee conferences”.

By 1946, Todhunter Ballard had joined their ranks for the weekly luncheon at the Green Hotel. On one memorable day, Leslie Charteris, creator of The Saint, and Oscar J. Friend, pulp and screenwriter, came from Hollywood to join them.

In February 1947, Bellem discovered Saxon in his home, dead of an apparent heart attack.

=== Nick Ransom on stage ===
In August 2001, the Old School Theater Company staged an adaptation of a Bellem Nick Ransom story at New York’s Mazer Theater, as part of the New York International Fringe Festival. Retaining the title of the source, “Preview of Murder” (Thrilling Detective, June 1949), the play was rife with the hardboiled tropes that typified Bellem’s fiction.

== Death and legacy ==
Bellem died in Los Angeles on April 1, 1968, in virtual anonymity; at least, no obituaries were published. In the 1930s and ’40s, his name (and pennames) had been an institution on America’s newsstands. As a TV writer, his career generated no publicity. Once his pulps, and Belda Talking Records, had folded, his name faded away. Today, in a resurgence of interest, his stories are reprinted and read by a new circle of fans who find the same entertainment value that readers did on the first go-round.

Bellem’s wife Bebe died in Los Angeles, November 20, 1969.

== Selected fiction ==
=== Magazines ===
- “Warned”, Brief Stories Magazine, March 1926 [first known published fiction]
- “Lights Out!”, Real Detective Tales and Mystery Stories, August 1926 [first published detective story]
- “A Lesson in Life”, Paris Nights, October 1927 [first “sex story”]
- “Peaceful Bill”, Fight Stories, March 1929
- “Gorilla Justice”, The Underworld Magazine, May 1931
- “Want-ad Girl”, Thrilling Love, January 1933 [with Blanche Bellem]
- “Crimson Crises”, Greater Gangster Stories, January 1934
- “Murder by Proxy”, Spicy Detective Stories, June 1934 [first Dan Turner story]
- “Wooed by a Werewolf”, Uncanny Tales, November 1939
- “Blood for the Vampire Dead”, Mystery Tales, March 1940
- “Abandoned Lady”, The Stocking Parade, January 1943 [last known “sex story”]
- “At Night All Rats Are Gray”, The Masked Detective, Winter 1943
- “Strike Up the Gland”, Super Sports, January 1944
- “The Glass Noose”, The Phantom Detective, Winter 1952 [last known pulp story]

=== Books ===
- Blue Murder (NY: Phoenix Press, 1938)
- The Vice Czar Murders, by “Franklin Charles” (NY: Wilfred Funk, 1941) [written by Bellem and Cleve F. Adams]
- The Window with the Sleeping Nude (NY: Quinn Publishing Co., 1950)
- Shady Lady, by Cleve F. Adams (NY: Ace, 1955) [written with Bellem and W.T. Ballard]

=== Reprints ===
- Robert Leslie Bellem's Dan Turner, Hollywood Detective (OH: Bowling Green State University Popular Press, 1983); introduction by John Wooley [stories from Spicy Detective Stories, Hollywood Detective, Private Detective Stories, Speed Detective]
- Dan Turner, Hollywood Detective: Lights! Camera! Murder! (Malibu Graphics, 1990); introduction by John Wooley [Dan Turner stories and comics from Spicy Detective Stories, Hollywood Detective]
- Reckoning in Red: From the Case Files of Dan Turner, P.I., Volume 1 (Bloomington, IL: Black Dog Books, 2001) [Spicy Detective Stories]
- Death's Detour: The Surgeon of Souls. Vol. 1 (Bloomington, IL: Black Dog Books, 2002) [Spicy Mystery Stories]
- Gallows Heritage: The Surgeon of Souls. Vol. 2 (Bloomington, IL: Black Dog Books, 2003) [Spicy Mystery Stories ]
- Corpse on Ice: From the Case Files of Dan Turner, P.I., Volume 2 (Bloomington, IL: Black Dog Books, 2003) [Spicy Detective, Hollywood Detective]
- Roscoes in the Night (Silver Spring, MD: Adventure House, 2003); introduction by John Wooley [Spicy Detective, Hollywood Detective]
- Lust of the Lawless (Normal, IL: Black Dog Books, 2010); introduction by James Reasoner [Spicy Western Stories]
- Super-Detective Jim Anthony: The Complete Series, Volume 5 (Boston: Steeger Books, 2024) [Super-Detective; written by Bellem and W.T. Ballard]
- Super-Detective Jim Anthony: The Complete Series, Volume 6 (Boston: Steeger Books, 2025) [Super-Detective; written by Bellem and W.T. Ballard]

== Selected nonfiction ==
- “Overtime for Hen Increases Yield of Eggs”, Tulsa Tribune, February 5, 1922 [first known nonfiction piece]
- “Saving Time on Second Shots”, The Writer's Monthly, December 1928
- “Moods and Pulp-Paper Fiction”, The Author & Journalist, February 1932
- “Cure for Mike-Fright”, The Author & Journalist, July 1940
- “Introducing the Author: Robert Leslie Bellem”, Fantastic Adventures, July 1941
- “Like Preserved Strawberries”, Writer's Digest, November 1943
- “Break It Up!”, Writer's Digest, July 1947 [Bellem analyzes his story “Murder at Auction” (Hollywood Detective, March 1944)]

== Selected poetry ==
- “The Birdman”, Philadelphia Evening Public Ledger, March 22, 1919 [first known published work]
- “Forward, March!”, Argosy All-Story Weekly, November 7, 1925 [first known appearance in a pulp magazine]

== Film adaptations ==
- Blackmail (Republic Pictures, 1947), starring William Marshall as Dan Turner, adapted from Bellem's "Stock Shot" ("Speed Detective", July 1944)
- The Raven Red Kiss-Off (1990), starring Marc Singer as Dan Turner, screenplay by John Wooley, adapted from Bellem's "Homicide Highball" ("Hollywood Detective", February 1950)

== Resources ==
- "Bellem (Robert) papers (1931–1968)". Online Archive of California (OAC): University of California.
- William G. Contento & Phil Stephensen-Payne (June 15, 2026). "The FictionMags Index". Galactic Central. The FMI lists Bellem’s magazine fiction and poetry under "Index by Name=Bellem, Robert Leslie (1902–1968)".
- "Robert Leslie Bellem (1902-1968)". Internet Movie Database (IMDb).
- S.J. Perelman, “Somewhere a Roscoe…”, The New Yorker, October 15, 1938. The humorist relishes the prose in several Spicy Detective Dan Turner stories, but finds them predictable; Bellem isn’t named.
- Will Murray, “DC’s Tangled Roots”, Comic Book Marketplace, November 1997. A history of the Harry Donenfeld magazine conglomeration and how it led to the creation of DC Comics.
- Douglas Ellis (2003). Uncovered: The Hidden Art of the Girlie Pulps. Silver Spring, MD: Adventure House. ISBN 1-886937-74-5. An illustrated history of the risqué magazines of the 1920s and’30s that Bellem specialized in.
- David Saunders (2009). "Adolphe Barreaux (1899–1985)". Field Guide to Wild American Pulp Artists.
- "Nick Ransom Created by Robert Leslie Bellem (1902-1968)". The Thrilling Detective Web Site. Archived from the original on Dec 25, 2010.
- "Dan Turner, Created by Robert Leslie Bellem (1902-1968)". The Thrilling Detective Web Site. Archived from the original on Apr 21, 2011.
- Robert Leslie Bellem bibliographies 1-2 at HARD-BOILED site (Comprehensive Bibliographies by Vladimir Matuschenko) (2103).
- David Saunders (2014). "Frank Armer (1895–1965)". Field Guide to Wild American Pulp Artists.
- David Saunders (2014). "Harry Donenfeld (1893–1965)". Field Guide to Wild American Pulp Artists.
- Robert Leslie Bellem at the Internet Speculative Fiction Database.
