= Micheline Presle =

French actress (1922–2024)

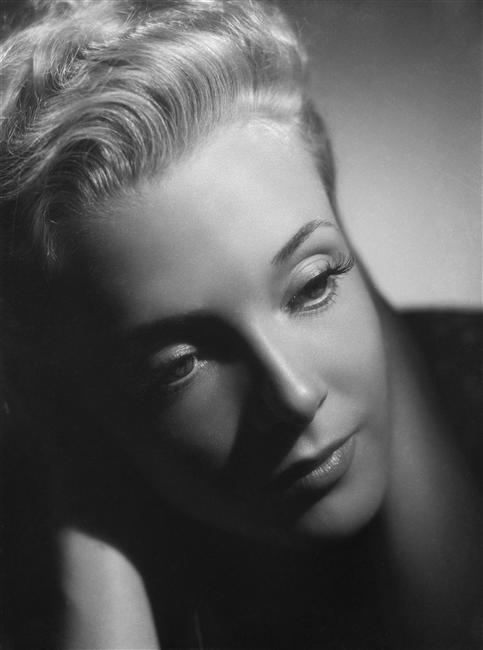
- Presle in 1945
- Born: Micheline Nicole Julia Émilienne Chassagne; 22 August 1922; Paris, France
- Died: 21 February 2024 (aged 101); Nogent-sur-Marne, France
- Other name: Micheline Prelle
- Years active: 1937–2014
- Spouse(s): Michel Lefort (m. 1945, divorced) William Marshall (m. 1950; div. 1954)
- Children: Tonie Marshall
- Relatives: Sarah Marshall (step-granddaughter)
- Awards: Honorary César (2004)

Micheline Presle (French pronunciation: [miʃlin pʁɛːl]; born Micheline Nicole Julia Émilienne Chassagne; 22 August 1922 – 21 February 2024) was a French actress. She was sometimes billed as Micheline Prelle. Starting her career in 1937, she starred or appeared in over 150 films appearing first in productions in her native France and also in Hollywood during the era of Classical Hollywood Cinema, before returning again to Europe, especially French films from the mid-1960s until 2014.

== Biography ==
=== Early life ===
Born in Paris on the left bank on 22 August 1922, Presle wanted to be an actress from an early age. She took acting classes in her early teens. She was the daughter of Robert Chassagne, a French banker (who fled to the United States amid a finance scandal) and artist Julie Bachelier.

She received early education in a convent school, but took acting classes with the Belgian actor Raymond Rouleau. She reprised the relationship by appearing with him in Falbalas, a/k/a Paris Frills (1945).

=== Early French cinema (1937–1950) ===
Presle made her film debut at the age of 15 in the 1937 production of La Fessée. In 1938, she was awarded the Prix Suzanne Bianchetti as the most promising young actress in French cinema. Her rise to European stardom, in films such as Devil in the Flesh (1947), led to offers in Hollywood.

"Exquisite good looks" coupled with a "graceful transition between froth and drama" facilitated her long career, with more than 200 credited roles.

=== Hollywood cinema ===
Her role in the Devil in the Flesh led to a Hollywood career, including leading roles opposite Errol Flynn, John Garfield, Paul Newman and Tyrone Power. That film was controversial, even being banned in Britain for years.

In 1950, Presle was signed by 20th Century Fox, led by Darryl F. Zanuck. He promised she "could avoid "ooh-la-la" eye-candy roles" with spare time so she could make a biopic about Sarah Bernhardt, a project to which she had obtained the film rights for a biography written by Bernhardt's granddaughter. However, Hollywood's promise soon dimmed. Zanuck changed Presle's last name to Prell, thinking to his American ear that her name was a homonym for 'pretzel.' It was later changed to Prelle after a soap company brought out Prell shampoo. Her first Hollywood production was a starring role opposite John Garfield in the film Under My Skin directed by Jean Negulesco. That same year, director Fritz Lang cast her opposite Tyrone Power in the war drama American Guerrilla in the Philippines. In 1950, she became the second wife of American actor William Marshall with whom she had a daughter, Tonie. William Marshall had teamed up with actor Errol Flynn and his production company, and in 1951 he directed Flynn and her in the film Adventures of Captain Fabian.

Disenchanted with Hollywood, since "They gave me uninteresting parts in bad pictures," she went back to work in European film.

In 1945, she married tennis player Michel Lefort. She later married William Marshall, an American actor and band leader. She returned to France, divorcing Marshall in 1954. Her career flourished in French films, and in 1957, she was a guest on the American Ed Sullivan Show. In 1959, she performed in the United Kingdom English-language production of Blind Date directed by Joseph Losey.

She returned to Hollywood in 1962 for the role of Sandra Dee's mother in the Universal Studios film If a Man Answers, which also featured Dee's husband, singer Bobby Darin. The following year, Presle acted again in English in The Prize starring Paul Newman.

=== Return to French cinema ===
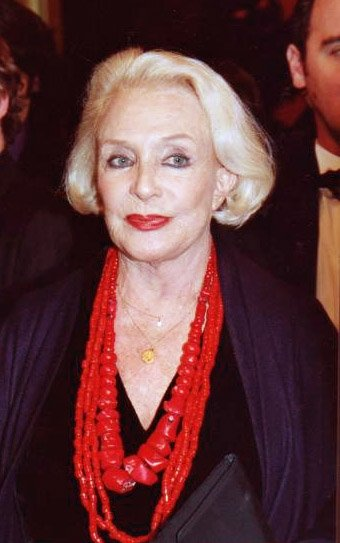
Presle at the 2004 César Awards

Presle did not make another English film, but after performing in more than 50 films in French, in 1989, she appeared in the French-made bilingual production I Want to Go Home, for which she was nominated for the César Award for Best Actress in a Supporting Role.

In 1971, Presle signed the Manifesto of the 343, publicly declaring she had had an illegal abortion.

She received an Honorary César in 2004.

Tonie Marshall, her daughter, won a César for Venus Beauty Institute in which Presle appeared.

=== Death ===
Presle died in Nogent-sur-Marne on 21 February 2024, at the age of 101, at the Maison des Artistes, a retirement home for artists, which receives partial government support. Her death was confirmed by Olivier Bomsel, her son-in-law, without specifying the cause.

== Filmography (selected) ==
A more complete list has been compiled by the British Film Institute with 133 works. (Note: The British Film Institute lists her filmography as including 133 works.)

Title	Year	References/Note
Girls in Distress a/k/a Young Girls in Trouble	1939	
They Were Twelve Women	1940	
Paradise Lost	1940	
Comedy of Happiness	1940	
Ecco la felicità	1940	
They Were Twelve Women	1940	
Parade en sept nuits	1941	
Foolish Husbands	1941	
Le soleil a toujours raison	1941	
La Nuit fantastique Fantasic Night	1942	As a "Dream woman" opposite Fernand Gravey
The Beautiful Adventure	1942	However it was not released until after the Liberation of France due to the ban on the films of Claude Dauphin after he joined the Free French.
Un seul amour	1943	An adaptation from a story by Honoré de Balzac about a ballet-star, Clara Biondi, played by Presle.
Paris Frills	1945	Film critic Manny Farber in The New Republic, 16 December 1946, wrote: "This is the only movie I have ever seen in which a posturing, narcissistic personality is shown in the full run of everyday situations and is handled with a matter-of-fact understanding that makes it into a sad, creative, extremely curious and complicated character."
Twilight	1945	Original Title: Felicie Nanteuil
Fausse alerte The French Way	1945 [1952] in United States)	Spy story. "[S]helved during the war ... (a shortened version was released with the title The French Way in 1952 in the United States). The film revolves around a long-standing feud...."
Boule de suif Angel and Sinner	1945	She palayed the eponymous lead, a loveable prostitute and member of the resistance. The film was released in the autumn of 1945, and was the first French film incorporating the theme of resistance. It is an adaptation of two short stories by Guy de Maupassant Boule de suif and Mademoiselle Fifi, which are inter-weaved, and is set during the Franco-Prussian War. A reviewer in Britain noted its "sense of humour, drama, satire and technical skill".
Les jeux sont faits	1946	French fantasy film directed by Jean Delannoy, based on the screenplay of the same name by French philosopher Jean-Paul Sartre. Entered into the 1947 Cannes Film Festival.
Devil in the Flesh	1947	World war I drama, voted one of 10 best films of the year by the National Board of Review.
All Roads Lead to Rome	1949	
The Last Days of Pompeii The Sins of Pompeii	1950	Adapted from Edward Bulwer-Lytton's novel The Last Days of Pompeii. The film has also been known as Sins of Pompeii.
Under My Skin	1950	Cast as a cafe owner smitten by love with a jockey.
American Guerrilla in the Philippines	1950	Early Technicolor war film.
Adventures of Captain Fabian	1951	It was to be produced independently with a distributor sought later. Micheline Presle was borrowed from 20th Century Fox to play the female lead.
The Lady of the Camellias	1953	
It Happened in the Park	1953	
The Love of a Woman	1953	
Les Impures	1954	
House of Ricordi	1954	
Napoléon	1955	
Thirteen at the Table	1955	
Beatrice Cenci	1956	
The Bride Is Much Too Beautiful	1956	
The She-Wolves	1957	
Christine	1958	
Blind Date	1959	
A Mistress for the Summer	1960	
Le Baron de l'écluse The Baron of the Locks	1960	
Mistress of the World	1960	science-fiction spy film remake of the 1919 eight-part silent film The Mistress of the World directed by William Dieterle and starring Martha Hyer and Carlos Thompson. It marked the comeback in his native country of the director William Dieterle after several decades spent in Hollywood. In West Germany, it was released in a longer version split in two parts (Die Herrin der Welt – Teil I and Die Herrin der Welt – Teil II). It was developed when producer Artur Brauner invested in a three-hour West German-French-Italian co-production. Brauner contracted William Dieterle to direct the film. The film was made with a predominantly German crew, but with a multi-national cast including Martha Hyer and Sabu from Hollywood, Carlos Thompson from Argentina and Gino Cervi from Italy, and Micheline Presle and Lino Ventura from France.
Les Grandes Personnes	1961	
Five Day Lover	1961	Based on the 1959 novel L'amant de cinq jours by Françoise Parturier. The film was entered into the 11th Berlin International Film Festival and nominated for the Golden Bear. The film was entered into the 11th Berlin International Film Festival and nominated for the Golden Bear, the ceremony's highest honor. It lost the prize to Michelangelo Antonioni's La Notte.
The Assassin	1961	
Time Out for Love Les grandes personnes	1961	
The Italian Brigands	1961	Internationally released as The Italian Brigands and Seduction of the South) is a 1962 Italian comedy- drama film directed by Mario Camerini. It was shot in Cerreto Sannita.
Le Diable et les Dix Commandements	1962	
If a Man Answers	1962	Opposite Bobby Darin.
Venere Imperiale Imperial Venus	1962	It depicts the life of Pauline Bonaparte, the sister of Napoleon. For her performance Lollobrigida won the David di Donatello for best actress and the Nastro d'Argento for the same category.
The Law of Men	1962	
The Bamboo Stroke	1963	
The Prize	1963	Amidst a Nobel Prize ceremony, spy drama with Paul Newman.
Dark Purpose	1964	
Male Hunt	1964	
Je vous salue, mafia! Hail Mafia	1965	From a crime novel. It is a film noir.
Le Roi de Cœur King of Hearts	1966	Released in France in 1966, King of Hearts was neither successful critically nor at the box office, with only 141,035 admissions. However, it achieved cult film status, when United States distribution rights were picked up by Randy Finley and Specialty Films in Seattle in 1973. It was paired with Marv Newland's Bambi Meets Godzilla and John Magnuson's Thank You Mask Man and marketed under the heading The King of Hearts and His Loyal Short Subjects. It made the rounds in the mid-1970s i repertory movie theaters as well as non-theatrical college and university film series across the United States, eventually running for five years at the now defunct film house the Central Square Cinemas (2 screens) in Cambridge, Massachusetts.
Peau d'Âne a/k/a Donkey Skin or Once Upon a Time and The Magic Donkey	1970	A 1970 French musical fantasy comedy film directed by Jacques Demy, based on Donkeyskin, a 1695 fairy tale by Charles Perrault about a king who wishes to marry his own daughter. It was highly successful in France. It is distributed on DVD in North America by Koch-Lorber Films. It is also available in Blu-ray format as part of Criterion's The Essential Jacques Demy collection. In France, the film is considered a cult classic.
The Legend of Frenchie King Petroleum Girls	1971	1971 French, Spanish, Italian and British international co-production western comedy film directed by Christian-Jaque and starring Claudia Cardinale and Brigitte Bardot. The film received generally negative reviews. Bardot's performance in particular was criticised by Jean Loup Passek, who noted how uncomfortable she seemed in the film's outdoors action setting. Writing in Variety Gene Moskowitz dismissed the film as "predictable, naive and gauche" whilst Tom Milne called it "drearily unfunny".
Devil in the Brain	1972	A 1972 Italian psychological thriller movie.
Thieves After Dark	1984	directed by Samuel Fuller
I Want to Go Home	1989	Directed by Alain Renais, and for which she received a César nomination
Fanfan	1993	
Les Misérables	1995	
Venus Beauty Institute	1999	
Le coeur à l'ouvrage	2000	
A Man and His Dog	2009	
Going South	2009	
Thelma, Louise et Chantal	2010	
HH, Hitler à Hollywood	2011	A mockumentary.

== Television ==
- Combat! (ABC, 1963, episode "Just for the Record"), U.S. drama series.
- Les Saintes Chéries (ORTF, 1965–1971), French comedy series in which she played the female lead opposite Daniel Gélin.
- Clochemerle (BBC, 1972), British comedy series adapted by Galton and Simpson from the novel by Gabriel Chevallier.
- Tales of the Unexpected (Anglia TV, 1984, episode "Kindly Dig Your Grave"), British anthology series.
