= Sarah Marshall (French model) =

French model and actress (born 1981)

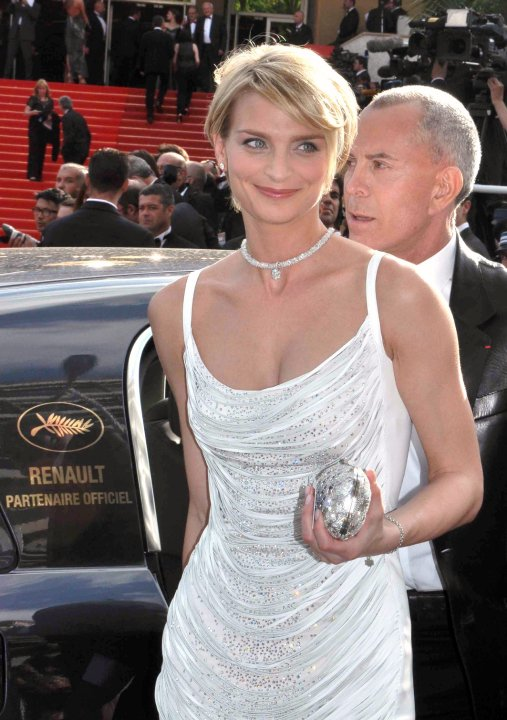
- Marshall in 2010
- Born: 1 June 1981 (age 45)
- Occupations: Model, actress
- Spouse: Alexandre Anthony
- Children: 1
- Parent: Mike Marshall (father)
- Relatives: William Marshall (grandfather); Michèle Morgan (grandmother); Tonie Marshall (aunt); Micheline Presle (step-grandmother)

Sarah Marshall (born 1 June 1981) is a French model and actress.

== Biography ==
Sarah Marshall is the granddaughter of Michèle Morgan and William Marshall, the daughter of Mike Marshall, the niece of Mike's half-sister, Tonie Marshall, and the great-grandniece of Micheline Presle. She is married to Alexandre Anthony, the son of Richard Anthony. Together they have a son, Zoltan. Alexandre and Sarah have a tumultuous relationship which they describe in their common book, Les Amants du destin.

== Filmography ==
- Sexy Boys (2001)
- Andalucia (2007)

== Book ==
- Les Amants du Destin - Sarah Marshall, Alexandre Anthony and Alain Morel - JML Ed. - 1 May 2004 - ISBN 2-84928-061-5
