= Pentimento (disambiguation) =

A pentimento is an alteration in a painting evidenced by traces of previous work.

Pentimento may also refer to:

- Pentimento: A Book of Portraits, a 1973 book by American writer Lillian Hellman
- Pentimento Music Company, American independent record label
- Pentimento (album), 2002 debut album by singer Jessica Molaskey
- Pentimento (band), an American punk rock band
- Pentimento (film), a 1989 French comedy film directed and written by Tonie Marshall

== See also ==
- Pentiment (video game), 2022 video game by Obsidian Entertainment
