= Adventures of Captain Fabian =

1951 film by Robert Florey

- 1951 theatrical poster
- Directed by: William Marshall; Uncredited: Robert Florey
- Written by: Errol Flynn
- Based on: Fabulous Ann Madlock by Robert T. Shannon
- Produced by: Robert Dorfmann
- Starring: Errol Flynn; Micheline Presle; Vincent Price; Agnes Moorehead; Victor Francen
- Cinematography: Marcel Grignon
- Edited by: Henri Taverna
- Music by: René Cloërec
- Production companies: Les Films Corona; Silver Films
- Distributed by: Republic Pictures
- Release date: September 21, 1951 (Los Angeles)
- Running time: 100 minutes
- Countries: United States; France
- Languages: English; French
- Box office: 1,505,518 admissions (France)

Adventures of Captain Fabian or Adventure in New Orleans is a 1951 American-French adventure film directed by William Marshall and starring Errol Flynn, Micheline Presle, Vincent Price, Agnes Moorehead and Victor Francen.

== Plot ==
George Brissac owns a large country mansion in New Orleans in 1860. He is engaged but having an affair with the French Creole girl Lea, a maid in his household who has a gypsy aunt named Jezebel. George stands to inherit the estate from his childless uncle as long he avoids trouble. One day when he is away, the maid throws a huge, drunken party in his house. When George returns, he fights with a partygoer over a girl and is briefly knocked unconscious. The man then tries to kiss the girl and she strikes him repeatedly on the head with George's cane, killing him. George fabricates a story to avoid blame and lies when the girl is tried for murder.

Captain Fabian returns to port and, despite having no link to the murder, he attends the trial. He stops the trial and convinces the judge to release the girl into his care. He buys a local bar and wishes to eliminate any connections with his bankrupt merchant father. Brissac kills his uncle when he finds him kissing the maid, and she demands that he marry her in exchange for her silence. When George's fiancée arrives with her family, she is informed of the new arrangement and says that she will wait until he comes to his senses. George weds Lea but feels that he has tricked into the marriage, and members of New Orleans society are shunning him.

Lea visits Fabian on his ship and they kiss. When she asks him to take her away, he reminds her she is now married. George, sensing something wrong with Lea, reports his uncle's disappearance to the police, but he knows that they will find his uncle's grave on the estate at some point. However, George has buried an inscribed pocket watch bearing Fabian's name with the body. When the watch is found, the police arrive at the conclusion that George had planned. He knows Lea cannot tell the truth without implicating herself, and she and George now want to kill each other.

The police arrest Fabian in his bar. Fabian very popular in the local community, knows that George is the likely murderer and realizes why he had married Lea. She holds the key to which man is hanged. George hires a local crook to lynch Fabian and create the appearance that it was caused by a mob of community members. He gives the crook the key to his warehouse of rum. Aunt Jezebel and Fabian's crew release him, and the two rival groups escape through the catacombs down to the docks, where a huge brawl ensues. The mob torches Fabian's ship as it tries to raise sail. Fabian and George fight underwater. Fabian wins, but his ship is destroyed and his cargo of gunpowder explodes, causing the ship's main mast to fall on Lea on the dock. She says Fabian's name as she dies in his arms.

== Cast ==
- Errol Flynn as Captain Fabian
- Micheline Presle as Lea Mariotte
- Vincent Price as George Brissac
- Agnes Moorehead as Aunt Jezebel
- Victor Francen as Henri Brissac
- Jim Gérald as Police Commissioner Germain
- Héléna Manson as Josephine
- Howard Vernon as Emile
- Roger Blin as Philippe

== Production ==
The project began as The Bargain, a script written by Errol Flynn, who signed a multi-picture deal with Marshall in July 1949 to produce the film and other features. The film was also known as Bloodline and New Orleans Adventure in its planning stages. Flynn signed a multi-picture deal with Marshall in July 1949 to produce the film, to be produced independently with distribution arranged later, and other features. Robert Florey, who had directed Errol Flynn in his last bit part in 1935, was hired as an uncredited consultant. Marshall and Flynn also produced the unreleased Hello God in 1951.

Micheline Presle, who married Marshall in 1950, was borrowed from Twentieth Century-Fox to play the female lead. Gérard Philipe was scheduled to join the cast but did not appear in the film.

Filming started on July 15, 1950 in Paris. Exteriors representing New Orleans were recreated in Villefranche, with studio scenes shot at the Victorine Studios in Nice and the Billancourt Studios in Paris. Marshall, who had no experience as a director, persuaded French authorities to permit filming of an English-language film without a French version as the law required.

Under Flynn's contract with Warner Bros., he was allowed to make one outside film a year until 1962, provided that the film had a major distributor. Flynn later claimed that during filming, Marshall secretly arranged for distribution by the mini-major studio Republic Pictures, displeasing both Warner Bros. and MGM, which had films starring Flynn awaiting release. Flynn worried that Warner Bros. would use the deal as an excuse to cancel his contract. On December 18, 1950 he filed suit in Los Angeles Superior Court seeking to enjoin Republic from releasing the film and to prevent Warner Bros. from canceling the contract until the court could determine whether Republic was a major distributor. The film was intended as the first of two to star Flynn under Marshall's direction; the next was to be The Man Who Cried, a psychological thriller about a perfect crime set over a four-hour period. However, The Man Who Cried was never produced because of a dispute between Marshall and Flynn over Hello God. In January 1952, Flynn asked a court to formally end his partnership with Marshall.

== Reception ==
In a contemporary review for The New York Times, critic Howard Thompson called the film "an absurd, yawn-provoking hodgepodge of romance, intrigue and swashbuckling capers" and a "floundering fiasco".

Critic Edwin Schallert of the Los Angeles Times wrote: "[T]his production is much in need of both editing and shortening. It will draw approval for the colorfulness of its settings and interesting costuming. The audience seemed to enjoy much of it, though there was a tendency towards laughter at scenes not especially designed for comedy. ... [O]ne cannot conclude that this picture in its present shape hangs together satisfactorily."

== Legacy ==
In November 1951, Flynn's associate Charles Gross filed a lawsuit claiming payments due for his work on the screenplay.

In 1954, Vincent Price sued Flynn and Marshall for $15,000 in unpaid wages, claiming that he had been promised a fee of $35,000. The case was resolved in Price's favor in 1957.
