= Alain Marcel =

French composer and writer (1952–2020)

- Born: 1952; Algeria
- Died: 9 March 2020 (aged 67–68); Rio de Janeiro, Brazil
- Occupations: Composer; Playwright; Actor
- Years active: 1974—2020

Alain Marcel (1952 — 9 March 2020) was a French music composer, playwright and actor. Notably active in musical theatre from the later 1970s, he wrote and directed French adaptations of the musicals Little Shop of Horrors, Kiss Me, Kate, and La Cage aux Folles.

== Biography ==
Marcel studied musical theatre at the Conservatoire de Tours, then at the Conservatoire de Paris. He wrote his first song in 1975 when he was a student of Antoine Vitez.

Marcel initially acted in television and films, while also composing, producing, and appearing in theatrical productions such as Essayez donc nos pédalos and Rayon femmes fortes. In total, he was involved in 570 performances. Essayez donc nos pédalos was choreographed by Tonie Marshall, and it explored homosexuality while it was still legally curtailed in France.

His greatest success was in the field of musical theatre. He directed and wrote the French versions of the American musicals Little Shop of Horrors, Kiss Me, Kate, and La Cage aux Folles. He performed at the Théâtre Déjazet, Théâtre de la Porte Saint-Martin, Casino de Paris, and Théâtre Mogador.

In the 2000s, Marcel gradually returned to music, composing music for the shows Le Paris d'Aziz et Mamadou, L'Opéra de Sarah (both at the Théâtre de l'Œuvre), and Encore un tour de pédalos.

Alain Marcel died on 9 March 2020, at the age of 68.

== Theatre ==
=== Actor ===
- Le Sexe faible (1974)
- Les papas naissent dans les armoires (1978)
- Essayez donc nos pédalos (1979)
- Lulu (2003)
- Perthus (2008)
- Rue de Babylone (2012)
- Le Banquet d'Auteuil (2014)

=== Director ===
- Scènes de chasse en Bavière (1975)
- Essayez donc nos pédalos (1979)
- Rayon femmes fortes (1983)
- Le Barbier de Séville (1983)
- L'Italienne à Alger (1984)
- Les Mariés de la tour Eiffel (1985)
- La Petite Boutique des horreurs (1986)
- Tam tam au pays des noirs-blancs (1986)
- Palier de crabes (1987)
- Peter Pan (1991)
- Kiss Me, Kate (1992)
- La Cage aux folles (1999)
- Le Paris d'Aziz et Mamadou (2004)
- Perthus (2008)
- L'Opéra de Sarah - avant l'Amérique (2009)
- Encore un tour de pédalos (2010)

=== Author ===
- Essayez donc nos pédalos (1979)
- Rayon femmes fortes (1983)
- Le Paris d'Aziz et Mamadou (2004)
- Algérie Chérie (2009)
- L'Opéra de Sarah - avant l'Amérique (2009)
- Encore un tour de pédalos (2010)

=== Composer ===
- Essayez donc nos pédalos (1979)
- Rayon femmes fortes (1983)
- Si jamais je te pince !... (1980)
- Le Paris d'Aziz et Mamadou (2004)
- Encore un tour de pédalos (2010)

== Filmography ==
=== Films ===
- Gloria (1977)
- Rape of Love (1978)
- Diva (1981)
- The Cheat (1984)

=== Television ===
- Jean-Christophe (1978)
- Ce diable d'homme (1978)
- Une femme, une époque (1978)
- Les Eygletière (1978)
- Elle voulait faire du cinéma (1983)
