= Number One (2017 film) =

2017 film

- Film poster
- Directed by: Tonie Marshall
- Written by: Tonie Marshall; Marion Doussot; Raphaëlle Bacqué
- Produced by: Tonie Marshall; Véronique Zerdoun
- Starring: Emmanuelle Devos
- Cinematography: Julien Roux
- Edited by: Marie-Pierre Frappier
- Music by: Fabien & Mike Kourtzer
- Distributed by: Pyramide Distribution
- Release dates: 8 September 2017 (TIFF); 11 October 2017 (France)
- Running time: 110 minutes
- Country: France
- Language: French
- Budget: $7.3 million
- Box office: $1.1 million

Number One (French: Numéro une), also released as Woman Up! in the United Kingdom and the United States, is a 2017 French drama film directed by Tonie Marshall, her last film before her 2020 death. It was screened in the Special Presentations section at the 2017 Toronto International Film Festival.

== Background ==
According to Marshall, the original idea of Number One was back in 2009 for a series that follows eight women leaders working in industry, politics, media, and sports. However, no TV Channel was interested. In 2017, she recovered the idea for a feature film. She reduced the number of characters and focused on just one woman, Emmanuelle Blachey.

For the film, Marshall researched the female corporative world through in-depth discussions.

== Synopsis ==
Emmanuelle Blachey (Emmanuelle Devos) is an ambitious corporate manager that aspires to become the first managing director of a major French company. However, she faces vicious sexism.

== Cast ==
- Emmanuelle Devos as Emmanuelle Blachey
- Suzanne Clément as Véra Jacob
- Richard Berry as Jean Beaumel
- Sami Frey as Henri Blachey
- Benjamin Biolay as Marc Ronsin
- Francine Bergé as Adrienne Postel-Devaux
- Bernard Verley as Jean Archambault
- John Lynch as Gary Adams

== Reception ==
On review aggregator website Rotten Tomatoes, the film holds an approval rating of 100%, based on 11 reviews, and an average rating of 7.5/10.
