= Mike Marshall (actor) =

French-American actor (1944–2005)

- Born: Michael William Marshall; September 13, 1944; Hollywood, California, United States
- Died: June 2, 2005 (aged 60); Caen, Calvados, Basse-Normandie, France
- Occupation: Actor
- Years active: 1961–2005
- Children: 6, including Sarah
- Parents: William Marshall (father); Michèle Morgan (mother)
- Relatives: Tonie Marshall (half-sister)

Michael William Marshall (September 13, 1944 – June 2, 2005) was a French-American actor.

== Early life and career ==
Marshall was born in Cedars of Lebanon Hospital, a hospital in Hollywood, on September 13, 1944. He was the only child of American actor-director William Marshall and French actress Michèle Morgan and was the stepson of Gérard Oury as well as half-brother to Tonie Marshall.

When his parents divorced, his father made sure that he received an American education. He began studying law, but dreamed of becoming an actor.

He later joined his mother in Paris. Marshall began to take drama classes from Raymond Griard and later directed his first film, Potato, in France under the direction of Robert Thomas, adapted from the play's eponymous Marcel Achard. He had already appeared in two films from overseas, the first was directed by his father, and the second by Vincente Minnelli. Gérard Oury, Marshall's step-father, offered him a role of a young Canadian airman in La Grande Vadrouille, as a doctor in Le Coup du parapluie.

Marshall had a long, low-key career as a character actor in French cinema. On stage he starred in Croque-monsieur, Le Vallon, and Point de feu sans fumée. Marshall has also appeared in several television series and featured in a supporting role as US Marine Colonel Scott in Moonraker (1979), filmed in France.

== Personal life and death ==
Marshall fathered six children. He died in Caen, France, aged 60, survived by his mother.

== Filmography ==
- 1961: The Phantom Planet (by William Marshall) - Lt. White
- 1963: The Courtship of Eddie's Father (by Vincente Minnelli) - Wedding guest (uncredited)
- 1964: Patate (by Robert Thomas) - Jean François de Baylac
- 1965: Déclic et...des claques (by Philippe Clair) - Vivi
- 1965: Les Deux orphelines (by Riccardo Freda) - Roger de Vaudray
- 1966: La Fille de la mer Morte (Fortuna) (by Menahem Golan) - Pierre
- 1966: Is Paris Burning? (by René Clément) - Membre F.F.I (uncredited)
- 1966: La Grande Vadrouille (by Gérard Oury) - Alan Mac Intosh
- 1967: Susanne, die Wirtin von der Lahn (by François Legrand / Franz Antel) - Anselmo, a student
- 1968: Death Rides Along, by Joseph Warren / Giuseppe Vari : Idaho Kent
- 1968: I'll Sell My Skin Dearly (Vendo cara la pelle) (by Ettore Maria Fizzarotti) - Shane
- 1969: Les Chemins de Katmandou (by André Cayatte) - Harold
- 1970: Hello-Goodbye (by Jean Negulesco) - Paul
- 1970: La liberté en croupe (by Édouard Molinaro) - uniquement assistant réalisateur (uncredited)
- 1973: Quelques messieurs trop tranquilles (by Georges Lautner) - Inspector
- 1973: Le Serpent (by Henri Verneuil) - (uncredited)
- 1973: The Day of the Jackal (by Fred Zinnemann) - Gendarme in Tulle (uncredited)
- 1973: Les Aventures de Rabbi Jacob (by Gérard Oury) - Rôle coupé au montage (uncredited)
- 1973: L'Histoire très bonne et très joyeuse de Colinot trousse-chemise (by Nina Companeez) - Le seigneur
- 1979: Lady Oscar (by Jacques Demy) - Nicolas de la Motte
- 1979: I love you, je t'aime (by George Roy Hill) - 1st Assistant Director
- 1979: Moonraker (by Lewis Gilbert) - Col. Scott
- 1979: The Hostage Tower (by Claudio Guzman) - U.S. Guard
- 1980: Le Coup du parapluie (by Gérard Oury) - Le docteur
- 1981: Une saison de paix à Paris – (Sezona mira u Parizu) (by Pregrad Golobovic)
- 1981: Téhéran 43, nid d'espions (by Alexandre Alov and Vladimir Naoumov) - First Terrorist
- 1982: La Morte Vivante (by Jean Rollin) - Greg
- 1983: Ça va pas être triste (by Pierre Sisser) - Le motard
- 1984: The Secret of the Selenites (by Jean Image) - Sirius (voice)
- 1984: French Lover (Until September) (by Richard Marquand) - Friend of Xavier
- 1985: Asterix Versus Caesar (by Paul and Gaëtan Brizzi) - Tragicomix (English version, voice)
- 1985: Maine-Océan (by Jacques Rozier) - L'Avocat 'au fond des bois'
- 1986: Je hais les acteurs (by Gérard Krawczyk) - J.P. Jones
- 1986: Asterix in Britain - The Wine Thief (English version, voice)
- 1987: Club de rencontres (by Michel Lang) - Roland - l'amant d'Agnès
- 1987: Johann Strauss: The King Without a Crown (by Franz Antel) - Eduard Hanslick
- 1987: Grand Larceny (by Jeannot Szwarc) - (uncredited)
- 1989: La Révolution française / Les années terribles (by Richard T. Heffron) - Un lieutenant (segment "Années Terribles, Les")
- 1990: Mister Frost (by Philippe Setbon) - Patrick Hollander
- 1991: S.A.S, l'œil de la veuve – (Eye of the Widow) (by Andrew V. McLaglen) - Klaus
- 1994: Neuf mois (by Patrick Braoudé) - Arthur's father
- 2001: Fifi Martingale (by Jacques Rozier) - L'auteur
- 2004: L'Américain (by Patrick Timsit) - Le policier américain
- 2004: Les aventures extraordinaires de Michel Strogoff (by Bruno-René Huchez and Alexandre Huchez) - Ivan Ogareff (voice)

=== French television ===
- 1972: Meurtre par la bande (TV) episode of the TV series Les Cinq Dernières Minutes, by Claude Loursais) - L'employé des Pompes funèbres
- 1973: L'Alphomega (by Lazare Iglesis)
- 1977: Little House on the Prairie, episode L'or ", le rôle du pasteur
- 1979: Les dames de la côte (by Nina Companeez)
- 1983, 1987: Les Enquêtes du commissaire Maigret (épisodes "La Tête d'un homme" and "Les Caves du Majestic", by Louis Grospierre and Maurice Frydland) - Le tzar Alexandre 1er / Oswald Clark / William Crosby
- 1987: Le Tiroir secret (6 episodes, by Édouard Molinaro, Nadine Trintignant, Michel Boisrond and Roger Gillioz) - Luc Jolivet
- 1991: La Grande Dune (by Bernard Stora) - Sammy
- 1996–1998: Les Vacances de l'amour (by Pat Le Guen-Ténot, Olivier Altman, Emmanuel Fonlladosa, reoccurring role of Capitaine Oliver) - Oliver
- 1997: Jamais deux sans toi...t (episode 131 de Dominique Masson: "Devine qui vient squatter") - Jean-Pierre
- 1997: Le grand Batre, réalisée par Laurent Carceles d'après le roman de Frédérique Hébrard, rôle de Teddy
- 2000: Avocats et Associés (épisode # 3.3: "Le bébé de la finale", by Denis Amar) - Dr. Meriot
- 2000: Commissaire Moulin (épisode "Une protection très rapprochée") - Machard
- 2002–2004: Funky Cops (by Thierry Sapyn - Additional voices (voice)

== Theatre ==
- Croque-monsieur – directed by Jean-Pierre Grenier at the St. George Theatre
- Le Vallon – directed by Simone Benmussa at the Rennaud-Barrault Theatre
- Point de feu sans fumée – directed by Jean Paul Tribout at the Théâtre Édouard VII
- L'Homme au Parapluie – directed by Daniel Royan at the Theatre de saint Maur
