= Quick, Let's Get Married =

1964 film by William Dieterle

- Directed by: William Dieterle
- Written by: Allan Scott
- Produced by: William Marshall
- Starring: Ginger Rogers; Ray Milland; Barbara Eden
- Cinematography: Robert J. Bronner
- Edited by: Carl Lerner
- Music by: Michael Colicchio
- Production companies: Kay Lewis Enterprises; William Marshall Productions
- Distributed by: Golden Eagle
- Release date: 1964
- Running time: 96 minutes
- Country: United States
- Language: English

Quick, Let's Get Married (also known as Seven Different Ways and The Confession) is a 1964 American comedy film directed by William Dieterle and starring Ginger Rogers, Ray Milland and Barbara Eden.

== Plot ==
Experienced thief Mario Forni arrives in the quiet Italian town of Toledo, hunting for a long-buried ancient treasure. Posing as a house painter, he soon falls in love with Madame Rinaldi, the charismatic owner of the local bordello.

Mario eventually locates the treasure hidden beneath a statue of St. Joseph in the ruins of the town's old church. While working inside the statue's hollow base, he overhears Pia—one of Rinaldi's prostitutes—confide that she's pregnant and determined to keep the child. Speaking from within the statue, Mario pretends to be St. Joseph responding to her, causing the startled Pia to faint. He quietly leaves a handful of gold coins beside her.

Pia awakens convinced a miracle has occurred and persuades the townspeople of the same. Meanwhile, the corrupt mayor Pablo and the greedy town banker Aguesta suspect Pia knows the treasure's location and begin scheming to exploit the situation.

A bishop arrives to investigate the supposed miracle. Although Mario has already confessed the hoax to Pia, the bishop comes to see the event as genuinely miraculous—having brought hope and renewal to Pia and the struggling community. When the statue suddenly collapses, it reveals a hidden golden cross beneath.

As the townsfolk celebrate their newfound future, Mario and Madame Rinaldi quietly depart together, taking a portion of the treasure to begin a new life elsewhere.

== Cast ==
- Ginger Rogers as Madame Rinaldi
- Ray Milland as Mario Forni
- Barbara Eden as Pia Pacelli
- Walter Abel as The Thief
- Pippa Scott as Gina
- Elliott Gould as The Mute
- Carl Schell as Beppo
- Michael Ansara as Mayor Pablo
- Cecil Kellaway as The Bishop
- David Hurst as Gustave
- Vinton Hayworth as Aguesta, Town Banker
- Leonardo Cimino as Dr. Paoli
- Carol Ann Daniels
- Mara Lynn
- Julian Upton
- Michael Youngman
- Jeremy Verity as Town Clerk

== Production ==
The film was produced by Rogers's husband William Marshall in an attempt to revive her screen career. The production was filmed in Jamaica, West Indies, at a movie studio Rogers and Marshall had built as a joint venture with the Jamaican government. It was the only film that resulted from that venture. It was the last of three films in which Rogers appeared with Milland.

The film had a troubled production, with original director Victor Stoloff being replaced by Dieterle. It was Elliot Gould's first film role.

The film did employ local actors in Jamaica, and included footage from Bog Walk, Hermitage Dam and Spanish Town.

Rogers noted that she never would have done such a production had the producer not been her husband, pointing out that his first attempt at film production was also his last. The disaster cost Rogers her longtime friendship with director William Dieterle, screenwriter Allan Scott, and co-star Ray Milland.

== Release ==
The film was originally a limited release in 1964 titled The Confession. It was not successful and was shelved until the 1970s, when it was rereleased during a period of Elliott Gould's popularity, since he appeared briefly in the film. It was retitled as Seven Different Ways and then again released in 1971 as Quick, Let's Get Married.

== Critical reception ==
VideoHound's Golden Movie Retriever said, "Quick, let's not watch this movie. Even the people who made it must have hated it; they waited seven years to release it."

== Bibliography ==
- Brown, Helen Gurley (1983). "The Confession ( 1965 )". Cosmopolitan. Vol. 194. Hearst Corporation. p. 225.
- Craddock, Jim (2002). VideoHound's Golden Movie Retriever: 2002. Visible Ink Press. ISBN 978-0-7876-5755-0.
- McKay, James (2020). Ray Milland: The Films, 1929-1984. McFarland. ISBN 978-1-4766-7887-0.
- Monaco, James (1991). The Encyclopedia of Film. Perigee Books. ISBN 978-0-399-51604-7.
- Parish, James Robert (1992). Prostitution in Hollywood Films: Plots, Critiques, Casts, and Credits for 389 Theatrical and Made-for-television Releases. McFarland. ISBN 978-0-89950-677-7.
- Parish, James Robert (1974). The RKO Gals. Arlington House. ISBN 978-0-87000-246-5.
- Polack, Peter (2017). Jamaica, the Land of Film. Cambridge Scholars Publishing. ISBN 978-1-4438-7375-8.
