= Emmanuelle Devos =

French actress

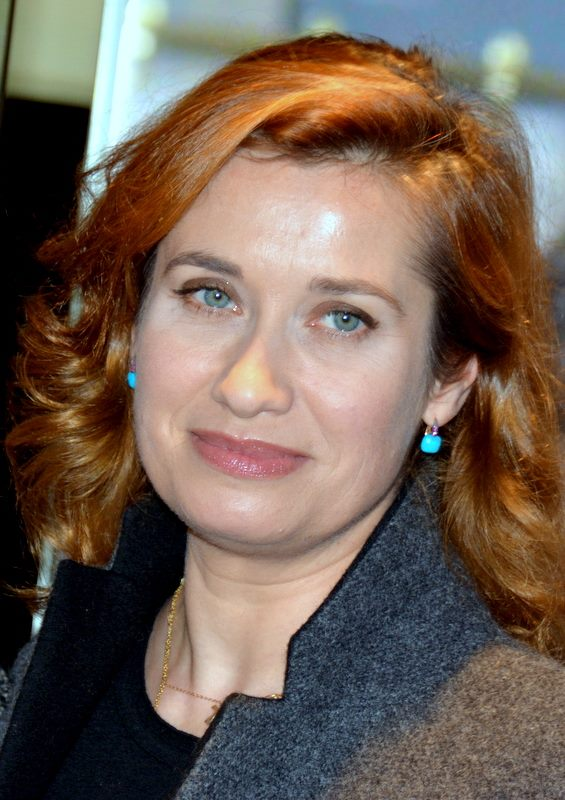
- Devos in 2013
- Born: 10 May 1964 (age 62); Puteaux, France
- Occupation: Actress
- Years active: 1986–present
- Spouse: Gilles Cohen

Emmanuelle Devos (French: [ɛmɑ̃nɥɛl dəvos]; born 10 May 1964) is a French actress. She is the daughter of actress Marie Henriau. She won the César Award for Best Actress in 2002 for her performance in Sur mes lèvres, directed by Jacques Audiard. She has also been nominated further three times for the award. She was a member of the Jury for the Main Competition section at the 2012 Cannes Film Festival.

== Filmography ==
Year	Title	Role	Director
1991	La Vie des morts	Laurence O'Madden Burke	Arnaud Desplechin
1992	La Sentinelle ("The Sentinel")	Claude	Arnaud Desplechin
1993	Les Patriotes ("The Patriots")	Rachel	Éric Rochant
1994	Oublie-moi	Christelle	Noémie Lvovsky
1994	Consentement mutuel	Judith	Bernard Stora
1995	Anna Oz	Corinne	Éric Rochant
1996	Comment je me suis disputé… (ma vie sexuelle) ("My Sex Life... or How I Got into an Argument")	Esther	Arnaud Desplechin
1997	Artemisia	Costanza	Agnès Merlet
1999	Peut-être	Juliette	Cédric Klapisch
2000	Aïe	Claire	Sophie Fillières
2000	Esther Kahn	Sylvia (the Italian woman)	Arnaud Desplechin
2001	Sur mes lèvres ("Read My Lips")	Carla	Jacques Audiard
2001	L'Adversaire ("The Adversary")	Marianne	Nicole Garcia
2002	Au plus près du paradis ("Nearest to Heaven")	young woman in cinema	Tonie Marshall
2003	Il est plus facile pour un chameau... ("It's Easier for a Camel...")	Philippe's wife	Valeria Bruni Tedeschi
2003	La Femme de Gilles ("Gilles's Wife")	Élise	Frédéric Fonteyne
2003	Rencontre avec le dragon	Gisela von Bingen	Hélène Angel
2004	Bienvenue en Suisse	Sophie	Léa Fazer
2004	Rois et reine ("Kings and Queen")	Nora Cotterelle	Arnaud Desplechin
2005	De battre mon cœur s'est arrêté ("The Beat That My Heart Skipped")	Chris	Jacques Audiard
2005	La Moustache ("The Moustache")	Agnès Thiriez	Emmanuel Carrère
2005	Good Girl	Fontaine Leglou	
2007	Ceux qui restent	Lorraine Grégeois	Anne Le Ny
2007	Deux vies plus une ("Two Lives Plus One")	Éliane Weiss	Idit Cebula
2008	Un conte de Noël ("A Christmas Tale")	Faunia	Arnaud Desplechin
2008	Non-dit ("Unspoken")	Grace	Fien Troch
2009	Plus tard tu comprendras	Tania	Amos Gitai
2009	Coco avant Chanel	Émilienne d'Alençon	Anne Fontaine
2009	Les Herbes folles ("Wild Grass")	Josépha	Alain Resnais
2009	Les Beaux Gosses ("The French Kissers")	the principal	Riad Sattouf
2009	Bancs publics (Versailles Rive-Droite) ("Park Benches")	Arthur's mother	Bruno Podalydès
2009	À l'origine ("In the Beginning")	Stéphane (the village's mayor)	Xavier Giannoli
2009	Complices ("Accomplices")	Karine Mangin	Frédéric Mermoud
2011	La Permission de minuit	Carlotta	Delphine Gleize
2012	Le Fils de l'autre ("The Other Son")	Orith Silberg	Lorraine Lévy
2013	Violette	Violette Leduc	Martin Provost
2013	Le Temps de l'aventure ("Just a Sigh")	Alix	Jérôme Bonnell
2013	La Vie domestique ("Domestic Life")	Juliette	Isabelle Czajka
2014	Arrête ou je continue ("If You Don't, I Will")	Pomme	Sophie Fillières
2014	Jacky au royaume des filles ("Jacky in Women's Kingdom")	La présentatrice (Cameo)	Riad Sattouf
2014	On a failli être amies ("Almost Friends")	Carole Drissi	Anne Le Ny
2014	La Loi (Telefilm)	Simone Veil	Christian Faure
2016	Frank & Lola	Claire	Matthew Ross
2016	Moka	Diane Kramer	Frédéric Mermoud
2017	Number One	Emmanuelle Blachey	Tonie Marshall (2)
2018	Amin	Gabrielle	Philippe Faucon
2019	My Days of Glory	Nathalie Palatine	Antoine de Bary
2019	Perfumes	Anne Wahlberg	Grégory Magne
2021	Deception		Arnaud Desplechin
2021	Vous ne désirez que moi ("I Want to Talk About Duras")	Michèle Manceaux	Claire Simon
2022	Masquerade	Carole	Nicolas Bedos
2023	A Silence	Astrid Schaar	Joachim Lafosse
2025	Six Days in Spring	Josiane	Joachim Lafosse

== Awards and nominations ==
Year	Nominated work	Award	Category	Result
1997	My Sex Life... or How I Got Into an Argument	César Awards	Most Promising Actress	Nominated
2002	Read My Lips	César Awards	Best Actress	Won
2003	The Adversary	César Awards	Best Supporting Actress	Nominated
2005	Kings and Queen	César Awards	Best Actress	Nominated
2005	Kings and Queen	Lumière Awards	Best Actress	Won
2010	In the Beginning	César Awards	Best Supporting Actress	Won
2013	Just a Sigh	Cabourg Film Festival	Best Actress	Won
2015	Platonov	Molière Awards	Best Actress in a Public Theatre	Won
2018	Number One	Lumière Awards	Best Actress	Nominated
2021	Perfumes	Lumière Awards	Best Actress	Nominated
