= Blackmail (1947 film) =

1947 film by Lesley Selander

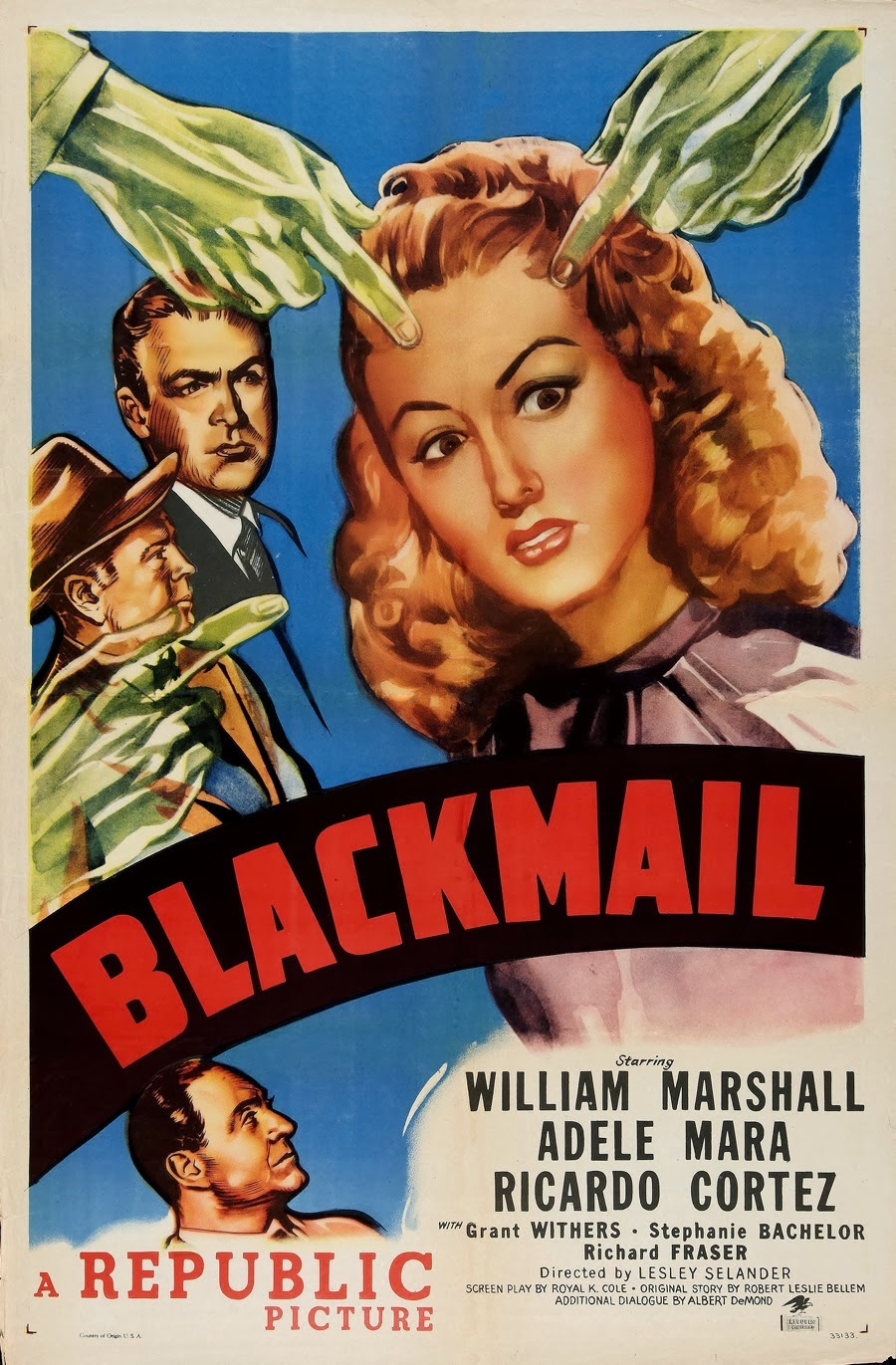
- Theatrical release poster
- Directed by: Lesley Selander
- Screenplay by: Royal K. Cole; Albert DeMond (additional dialogue)
- Story by: Robert Leslie Bellem
- Produced by: William J. O'Sullivan (associate producer)
- Starring: William Marshall; Adele Mara; Ricardo Cortez
- Cinematography: Reggie Lanning
- Edited by: Tony Martinelli
- Music by: Mort Glickman (uncredited)
- Production company: Republic Pictures
- Distributed by: Republic Pictures
- Release date: July 24, 1947
- Running time: 67 minutes
- Country: United States
- Language: English

Blackmail is a 1947 American film noir crime film directed by Lesley Selander and starring William Marshall, Adele Mara and Ricardo Cortez. The story was adapted from Robert Leslie Bellem's novelette "Stock Shot" (Speed Detective, July 1944), and features Bellem's hardboiled detective hero Dan Turner, Hollywood Detective.

== Plot ==
A shamus is approached by an entertainment executive to stop a blackmail plot against him.

== Cast ==
- William Marshall as Dan Turner
- Adele Mara as Sylvia Duane
- Ricardo Cortez as Ziggy Cranston
- Grant Withers as Police Inspector Donaldson
- Stephanie Bachelor as Carla
- Richard Fraser as Antoine le Blanc
- Roy Barcroft as Spice Kellaway
- George J. Lewis as Blue Chip Winslow
- Gregory Gaye as Jervis
- Tristram Coffin as Pinky
- Eva Novak as Mamie, the Maid
- Bud Wolfe as Gomez
- Tom London as Tom (uncredited)
- Ben Welden as Bartender (uncredited)

== Reception ==
When released The New York Times critic gave the film a mixed review, writing, "Evidently the writers and/or Republic, the manufacturer, were convinced that some fast dialogue would enhance the rather confused goings on. But this yarn about a California playboy who becomes involved with shakedown artists and is aided by a brash, private investigator needed more than an occasional bright quip to keep things clear and moving."
