= Le Tiroir secret =

1986 French mini-series

- DVD cover
- Genre: Drama
- Written by: Danièle Thompson; Jean-Patrick Manchette; Patrick Besson; Roger Grenier
- Directed by: Michel Boisrond; Edouard Molinaro; Nadine Trintignant; Roger Gillioz
- Starring: Michèle Morgan; Daniel Gélin; Marie-France Pisier; Jeanne Moreau
- Theme music composer: Vladimir Cosma
- Country of origin: France / Belgium / Italy / Switzerland / West Germany
- Original language: French

Production
- Executive producer: Jacques Simonnet
- Producer: Jacques Nahum
- Running time: 52 min

Original release
- Network: France 3 (FR 3)
- Release: 5 December 1986 – 9 January 1987

Le Tiroir secret is a 1986 French family drama TV mini-series (6 episodes) directed by Michel Boisrond, Edouard Molinaro, Nadine Trintignant and Roger Gillioz. The screenplay was written by Danièle Thompson, Jean-Patrick Manchette, Patrick Besson and Roger Grenier. The music score is by Vladimir Cosma. It was released on DVD in France on 18 October 2006. It tells the story of a woman who suspects that her husband (presumed dead) had in fact led a double life.

== Cast ==
- Michèle Morgan as Colette Dutilleul / Colette Lemarchand
- Marie-France Pisier as Nathalie Duthilleul
- Daniel Gélin as Jean-Pierre
- Michael Lonsdale as Philippe
- Heinz Bennent
- Liselotte Pulver
- Jeanne Moreau as Vivi
- Mike Marshall as Luc
- Tonie Marshall as Juliette
- Paulette Dubost
