= Nearest to Heaven =

- Directed by: Tonie Marshall
- Written by: Tonie Marshall; Anne-Louise Trividic
- Produced by: Olivier Bomsel; Gilles Sandoz; Fabienne Vonier
- Starring: Catherine Deneuve; William Hurt
- Cinematography: Agnès Godard
- Edited by: Jacques Comets
- Music by: François Dompierre; David Hadjadj; Jérôme Robotier
- Distributed by: Pyramide Distribution
- Release dates: August 30, 2002 (Venice); November 20, 2002 (France); November 7, 2003 (Spain)
- Running time: 96 minutes
- Countries: France; Spain; Canada
- Languages: English; French

Nearest to Heaven is a 2002 French-Spanish-Canadian romantic drama film directed by Tonie Marshall and starring Catherine Deneuve and William Hurt.

== Cast ==
- Catherine Deneuve as Fanette
- William Hurt as Matt
- Bernard Le Coq as Bernard
- Hélène Fillières as Lucie
- Patrice Chéreau as Pierre
- Nathalie Richard as Brigitte
- Gilbert Melki as Alain
- Emmanuelle Devos as Jeune femme cinéma
- Noémie Godin-Vigneau as Carole
- Paulina Porizkova as Mary Rafelson
- François Arnal as Himself
