= Rape of Love =

- Directed by: Yannick Bellon
- Produced by: Yannick Bellon; Marin Karmitz
- Starring: Nathalie Nell; Alain Fourès; Michèle Simonnet; Pierre Arditi; Daniel Auteuil; Bernard Granger; Alain Marcel; Gilles Tamiz
- Cinematography: Georges Barsky; Pierre-William Glenn
- Edited by: Janine See
- Music by: Aram Sedefian
- Release date: 11 January 1978
- Running time: 115 min.
- Countries: France; Belgium
- Language: French

Rape of Love (also known as L'amour violé) is a 1978 French and Belgian drama film directed and produced by Yannick Bellon. This film has been music composed by Aram Sedefian. The film starring Nathalie Nell, Alain Fourès, Michèle Simonnet, Pierre Arditi and Daniel Auteuil in the lead roles.

== Plot ==
Nicole, nurse in Grenoble, is raped one night by four men. Deeply scarred, emotionally and physically, she thinks she will never recover from the trauma. Following a friend's advice, she decides to file a lawsuit.

== Cast ==
- Nathalie Nell
- Alain Fourès
- Michèle Simonnet
- Pierre Arditi
- Daniel Auteuil
- Bernard Granger
- Alain Marcel
- Gilles Tamiz
- Catherine Stermann

== Production ==
Nathalie Nell said that after the gang rape scene she felt the same feeling as her character. Inexplicably, she felt ashamed "of the film crew, of future viewers". For several days, she struggled against the horror she inspired in herself, against the desire to hide, to no longer exist.
