= John Wooley =

American writer

John Steven Wooley
- Born: April 4, 1949 (age 77); Saint Paul, Minnesota, U.S.
- Occupations: Novelist; Screenwriter; Columnist; Historian; Radio/TV Host
- Writing career
- Genres: Horror fiction, Fantasy, Film noir, Science fiction, Comic books
- Website: johnwooley.com

John Steven Wooley (born April 4, 1949) is an American writer, novelist, historian, lecturer, filmmaker, and radio and TV host who specializes in the movies, literature, and music of the 1930s and ‘40s as well as other pop-culture histories.

He has written, co-written, or edited more than 50 books, including the 1930s-set epistolary horror trilogy The Cleansing (consisting of Seventh Sense, Satan's Swine, and Sinister Serpent), with Robert A. Brown; Right Down the Middle, the as-told-to biography of famed New York Yankees pitcher Ralph Terry, a northeastern Oklahoma boy who went on to become 1962 World Series MVP; the biography of moviemaker Wes Craven, The Man, and His Nightmares; and Shot in Oklahoma, a look at Sooner State-lensed pictures that was named Best Book on Oklahoma History for 2011 by the Oklahoma Historical Society.

He and collaborator Brett Bingham have written two nonfiction entertainment books: Thanks – Thanks A Lot, the as-told-to biography of American country music disc jockey and singer Billy Parker, and Twentieth-Century Honky-Tonk, a history of Cain's Ballroom, a historic music venue in Tulsa, Oklahoma.

In 2021, Babylon Books released a 40th-anniversary edition of his novel, co-written with Ron Wolfe, Old Fears, with new material by the authors.

Wooley was guest curator for an Oklahoma History Center exhibit, Oklahoma@ the Movies.

He co-produced (with Bryan Crain) the documentary film, Tulsa Terrors (2023), a look at the Tulsa-shot made-for-video horror movies of the late 20th century. His other documentaries include the Learning Channel special Hauntings across America and the recent Oklahoma Military Academy: The West Point of the Southwest. He also wrote the made-for-TV feature Dan Turner — Hollywood Detective, starring Marc Singer, Tracy Scoggins, and Arte Johnson, as well as the award-winning independent movie Cafe Purgatory. He also writes comic books and graphic novels, including Plan Nine from Outer Space, Grateful Dead Comix, and Death Rattle, along with The Twilight Avenger and Miracle Squad series, which he co-created with artist Terry Tidwell.

An entertainment writer for the Tulsa World newspaper for 23 years (1983–2006), Wooley has seen his articles and interviews appear in a wide range of other publications, from TV Guide to the horror-movie magazine Fangoria, for which he wrote more than 100 pieces.

He is also the producer and host of Swing on This, Tulsa's only western-swing radio program, on NPR affiliate KWGS (89.5 FM); it won an Outstanding Special Programming Award from the Oklahoma Association of Broadcasters in 2012. With Michael H. Price and producer-engineer Joey Hambrick, he co-hosts the Forgotten Horrors podcasts. Wooley is executive producer, writer, co-producer, and co-host of the public television series Film Noir Theatre, which is currently in its seventh season on RSU TV.

His work in music extends to songwriting and performing: “Gone Away,” which he co-wrote with Steve Ripley and Tim DuBois, was the first single from Ripley's 2003 solo disc, receiving international airplay. Later, it was covered for the country market by Bill Anderson with the Oak Ridge Boys. He has played Vox organ on discs by Ripley, the Red Dirt Rangers, and others. Currently, he works with the proto-psychedelic '60s band The Moody Dudes.

== Columns ==
- Tulsa World (1984–2006)
- Fangoria (at least as early as 1986)

== Comic books ==
- Miracle Squad (1986–89)
- Uncanny Man-Frog (1987)
- Twilight Avenger (1987–89)
- Plan Nine from Outer Space (graphic novel) (1990)
- Plan Nine from Outer Space: Thirty Years Later (1991)
- The Twilight Avenger Returns (2016), with Terry Tidwell

== Films ==
- Dan Turner, Hollywood Detective (1990)
- Cafe Purgatory (1991)

== Non-fiction books ==
- The Big Book of Biker Flicks (2005)
- Ed Galloway's Totem Pole Park: The Story Behind One of the Greatest Folk-Art Attractions on America's Mother Road, Route 66 (2014)
- Fantasies in the Sand: Birth of the Beach Party Box-Office Bonanza (2018)
- From the Blue Devils to Red Dirt: The Colors of Oklahoma Music (2006)
- The Good Life: The Remarkable Story of an American Farm Wife (2012), with Rose Mary Deegan
- Leon Russell in His Own Words (2019), ed. with Steve Todoroff
- Making Friends Was My Business: The Life Adventures of Oklahoma's "Bud Man" and His Family (2015), with Gail and John Cresap
- Right down the Middle: The Ralph Terry Story (2019), with Ralph Terry
- Shot in Oklahoma: A Century of Sooner State Cinema (2011)
- Twentieth-Century Honky-Tonk: The Amazing Unauthorized Story of the Cain's Ballroom's First 75 Years (2020), with Brett Bingham
- Voices From the Hill: The Story of Oklahoma Military Academy (2005)
- Wes Craven: The Man and his Nightmares (2011)

== Novels ==
- Old Fears (with Ron Wolfe)
- Dark Within (2000)
- Awash in the Blood (2001)
- Ghost Band (2006)
- Seventh Sense: The Cleansing: Book 1 (with Robert A. Brown) (2019)
- Satan's Swine: The Cleansing: Book 2 (with Robert A. Brown) (2019)
- Sinister Serpent: The Cleansing: Book 3 (with Robert A. Brown) (2020)

== Collections ==
- Doctor Coffin: The Living Dead Man, by Perley Poore Sheehan (Off-Trail Publications, 2007)
- Hard-Boiled Christmas Stories (2014), ed. with John McMahan
- Super-Detective Flip Book: Two Complete Novels, Victor Rousseau, Robert Leslie Bellem and W.T. Ballard (with John McMahan) (Off-Trail Publications, 2008)
- Thrilling Detective Heroes (2007), ed. with John Locke
- Shag & Bones: The Complete Series, by Russell Bender (Steeger Books, 2023)

== Radio ==
- Swing on This (KWGS 89.5 FM)
