= Accomplices (film) =

2010 film by Frédéric Mermoud

- Film poster
- Complices
- Directed by: Frédéric Mermoud
- Written by: Frédéric Mermoud; Pascal Arnold
- Produced by: Damien Couvreur; Tonie Marshall
- Starring: Gilbert Melki; Emmanuelle Devos; Nina Meurisse; Cyril Descours
- Cinematography: Thomas Hardmeier
- Edited by: Sarah Anderson
- Music by: Grégoire Hetzel
- Production companies: Tabo Tabo Films; Saga Productions; France 3 Cinéma; Rhône-Alpes Cinéma
- Distributed by: Pyramide Distribution (France)
- Release dates: 9 August 2009 (Locarno); 20 January 2010 (France)
- Running time: 93 minutes
- Countries: France; Switzerland
- Language: French
- Budget: € 3.8 million
- Box office: $800,000

Accomplices (original title: Complices) is a 2009 Franco-Swiss crime thriller film directed by Frédéric Mermoud. The film premiered in competition at the 2009 Locarno International Film Festival. It won the Swiss Film Award for Best Screenplay in 2010.

== Plot ==
Two police detectives in Lyon, both single and childless, are investigating the murder of a young man called Vince, whose body is found strangled in the river Rhône. It emerges that Vince was a high-end male prostitute, finding clients on the internet and meeting them in hotels. His girlfriend was a student, Reb, who he recruited to join him in threesomes, so increasing his range of clients and his earnings. One encounter went wrong when the client started to get rough with Reb, upon which Vince beat him up and the two fled. Furious at the way Reb had been treated, Vince decided to blackmail the man and arranged a rendezvous on the top floor of a multi-storey car park. After handing over the money, the client then attacked Vince with a golf club, upon which Reb waded in with her motorbike helmet. Her blows killed the man, so the two hid his body in his car and fled. Vince's pimp then met him to claim his share of Vince's takings and a fight developed, in which the pimp strangled Vince and then dumped his body in the river. The detectives charge the pimp with murder but not Reb. As she is young, was in love with Vince, is pregnant with his child and her mother is standing by her, they doctor her statement to exonerate her.

== Cast ==
- Gilbert Melki as Hervé Cagan, police officer
- Emmanuelle Devos as Karine Mangin, police officer
- Cyril Descours as Vincent Bouvier
- Nina Meurisse as Rebecca Legendre, in her final year at lycée
- Joana Preiss as Esther, mother of Rebecca
- Jérémy Azencott as Nicolas Bianchini
- Jérémy Kapone as Thomas Morazzini, student, pimp of Vincent
- Marc Rioufol as Jean-Paul Tardieu, ophthalmologist
- Yeelem Jappain as Belen
- Éric Laugérias as Yvan Cagan
- Serge Larivière as Hotel Client
- Anne Loiret as Lawyer
- Frédéric Épaud as Hotel Client
- Valérie Lang as Laurence
- Jean-Pierre Sanchez as Karim, prostitute, friend of Lola
- Clara Ponsot as Lola, a prostitute
- Olivier Guéritée as Mikaël
- Pierre Mifsud as Medical Examiner
- Brigitte Chambon as Vincent's mother
- Laetitia Dosch as Vincent's sister
- Nina Rodriguez as Nina
- Christophe Carry as Photographer
- Virginia Anderson as Pharmacist
- Cédric Monnet as Hammam Customer

== Production ==
The film was shot around Lyon, which Mermoud found offered an urban and provincial setting, as well as being by the Rhône. Meurisse had appeared in two films directed by Mermoud before Complices. Descours recounted that preparation for his role included discussing the work with male escorts.

In December 2024, testifying before the French parliamentary inquiry commission on violence in cinema and audiovisual, Nina Meurisse recounted the trauma she experienced while filming a sex scene in this movie.

== Accolades ==
Award / Film Festival	Category	Recipients and nominees	Result
Chicago International Film Festival	New Directors Competition - Gold Plaque	Frédéric Mermoud	Won
Locarno International Film Festival	Golden Leopard		Nominated
Swiss Film Award	Best Film		Nominated
Swiss Film Award	Best Screenplay	Frédéric Mermoud and Pascal Arnold	Won
