= Michèle Morgan =

French actress (1920–2016)

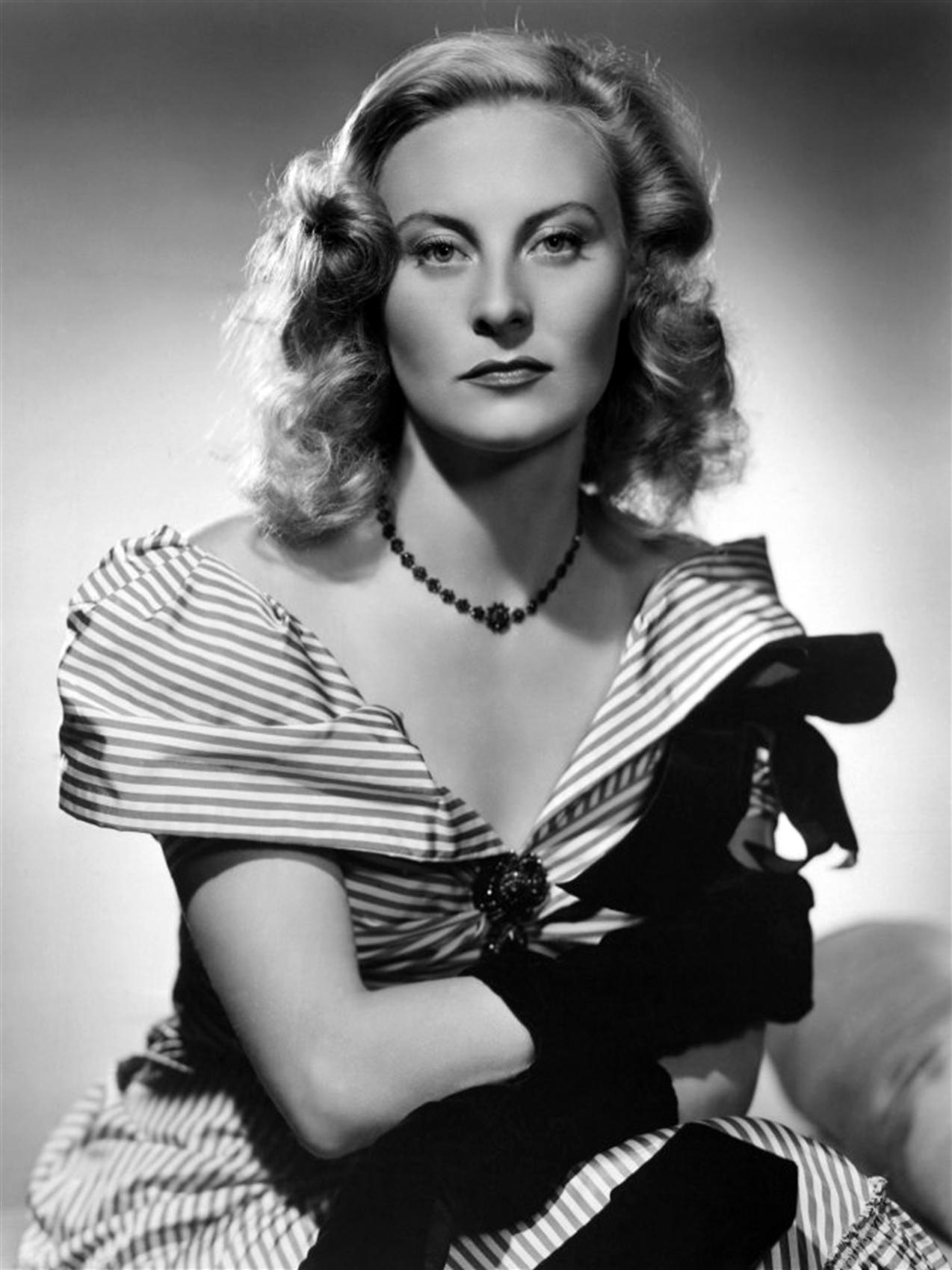
- Morgan in 1946
- Born: Simone Renée Roussel; 29 February 1920; Neuilly-sur-Seine, France
- Died: 20 December 2016 (aged 96); Neuilly-sur-Seine, France
- Resting place: Montparnasse Cemetery, Paris, France
- Occupation: Actress
- Years active: 1935–1999
- Spouses: William Marshall (m. 1942; div. 1948) Henri Vidal (m. 1950; died 1959) Gérard Oury (m. 1960; died 2006)
- Children: Mike Marshall
- Relatives: Sarah Marshall (granddaughter)

Michèle Morgan (French: [miʃɛl mɔʁɡɑ̃]; born Simone Renée Roussel; 29 February 1920 – 20 December 2016) was a French film actress, who was a leading lady for three decades in both French cinema and Hollywood features. She is considered one of the greatest French actresses of the 20th century. Morgan was the inaugural winner of the Best Actress Award at the Cannes Film Festival. In 1992, she was given an honorary César Award for her contributions to French cinema.

== Early life ==
Morgan was born Simone Renée Roussel in Neuilly-sur-Seine, Hauts-de-Seine, a suburb of Paris. She grew up in Dieppe, Seine-Maritime, France.

== Career ==
Morgan left home at the age of 15 for Paris determined to become an actress. She took acting lessons from René Simon while serving as an extra in several films to pay for her drama classes. It was then that she took the stage name "Michèle Morgan". She argued that she did not have the body type of a Simone, and "Morgan" sounded more Hollywood-friendly.

Morgan was first noticed by director Marc Allégret, who offered her a major role in the film Gribouille (1937), opposite Raimu. Then came Le Quai des brumes (1938) directed by Marcel Carné and Remorques (1941) directed by Jean Grémillon, both opposite Jean Gabin.

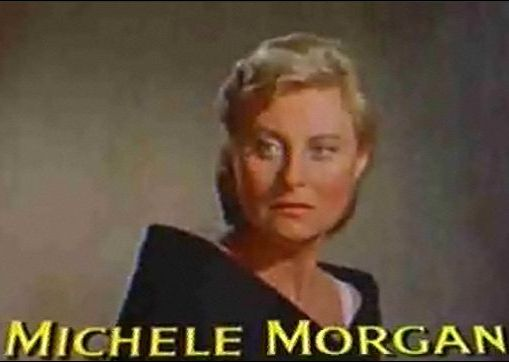
From the trailer for The Vintage (1957)

Upon the invasion of France in 1940 by the Germans, Morgan left for the United States and Hollywood where she was contracted to RKO Pictures in 1941. Her career there proved rather disappointing, apart from Joan of Paris (1942) opposite Paul Henreid, and Higher and Higher (1943) opposite Frank Sinatra. She was tested and strongly considered for the female lead in Casablanca but RKO would not release her for the amount of money that Warner Bros. offered. Morgan did work for Warners, however, in Passage to Marseille (1944) with Humphrey Bogart.

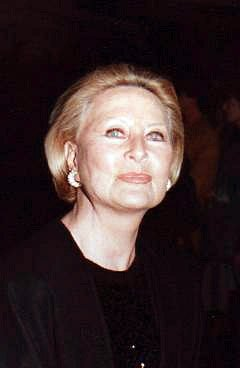
Morgan in 1995

After the war, Morgan returned to France and quickly resumed her career with the film La Symphonie Pastorale (1946) directed by Jean Delannoy, which earned her the Best Actress award at the Cannes Film Festival. Her other films from this period include; Carol Reed's The Fallen Idol (1948), Fabiola (1949), The Proud and the Beautiful (1953) by Yves Allégret, Les Grandes Manœuvres (1955) by René Clair and Marie-Antoinette reine de France (1956). She continued working in films throughout the 1960s, such as in Lost Command (1966), a version of Les Centurions. In the 1970s, she virtually retired from her acting career, then made only occasional appearances in film, television and theatre.

For her contribution to the motion picture industry, Morgan has a star on the Hollywood Walk of Fame at 1645 Vine Street. In 1969, the government of France awarded her the Légion d'Honneur. For her long service to the French motion picture industry, in 1992 she was given an Honorary César Award. In 1996, she also received the Career Golden Lion for lifetime achievement at the Venice Film Festival.

Morgan took up painting in the 1960s. She had a solo exhibition, "Artistes En Lumière à Paris", from 2 March to 30 April 2009, at the Espace Cardin in Paris. In 1977 she released her memoir, titled With Those Eyes (Avec ces yeux-là).

== Personal life and death ==
While in Hollywood, Morgan married William Marshall (1917–1994), in 1942, with whom she had a son, Mike Marshall (1944–2005). Morgan had built and owned a house at 10050 Cielo Drive. Morgan and Marshall divorced in 1948. She married French actor Henri Vidal (1919–1959) in 1950. She remained with him until his death in 1959. She then lived with film director and actor/writer Gérard Oury until his death in 2006.

Morgan died on 20 December 2016, aged 96, in Meudon, France of natural causes. Her funeral was held at the Église Saint-Pierre in Neuilly-sur-Seine on 23 December 2016, and she was buried at the Montparnasse Cemetery.

Despite living to the age of 96, she technically only had 24 birthdays due to being born on 29 February.

== Filmography ==
Year	Title	Role	Director	Notes
1935	Mademoiselle Mozart	The trainer of the white elephant	Yvan Noé	credited as Simone Morgan
1937	Gribouille	Nathalie Roguin	Marc Allégret	remade as The Lady in Question in 1940
1938	Orage	Françoise Massart	Marc Allégret	with Charles Boyer
1938	Port of Shadows	Nelly	Marcel Carné	with Jean Gabin
1938	Nightclub Hostess	Suzy	Albert Valentin	written by Charles Spaak
1939	Coral Reefs	Lilian White	Maurice Gleize	with Jean Gabin
1939	Musicians of the Sky	Lieutenant Saulnier	Georges Lacombe	with Michel Simon
1940	Stormy Waters	Catherine	Jean Grémillon	based on a novel by Roger Vercel
1940	The Heart of a Nation	Marie Froment-Léonard	Julien Duvivier	with Raimu
1941	My Life with Caroline	"Annette" (uncredited)	Lewis Milestone	written by John Van Druten
1942	La Loi du nord	Jacqueline Bert	Jacques Feyder	based on a novel by Maurice Constantin-Weyer
1942	Joan of Paris	Joan	Robert Stevenson	with Paul Henreid
1943	Two Tickets to London	Jeanne	Edwin L. Marin	with Alan Curtis
1943	Higher and Higher	Millie Pico alias Paméla Drake	Tim Whelan	Frank Sinatra's film debut
1944	Passage to Marseille	Paula	Michael Curtiz	with Humphrey Bogart
1946	The Chase	Lorna Roman	Arthur Ripley	with Robert Cummings
1946	Pastoral Symphony	Gertrude (the young blind woman)	Jean Delannoy	Cannes Film Festival Award for Best Actress with Pierre Blanchar
1947	The Fallen Idol	Julie	Carol Reed	with Ralph Richardson and Bobby Henrey.
1948	To the Eyes of Memory	Claire Magny	Jean Delannoy	with Jean Marais
1949	The Fighting Gladiator	Fabiola	Alessandro Blasetti	with Henri Vidal
1949	Here Is the Beauty	Jeanne Morel	Jean-Paul Le Chanois	based on a novel by Vicki Baum
1950	The Glass Castle	Evelyne Lorin-Bertal	René Clément	two versions, one filmed in Italian
1950	The Strange Madame X	Irène Voisin-Larive	Jean Grémillon	with Henri Vidal
1950	The Naked Heart	Maria Chapdelaine	Marc Allégret	based on the novel by Louis Hémon
1951	The Seven Deadly Sins	Anne-Marie de Pallières	Claude Autant-Lara	episode "Pride"
1952	The Moment of Truth	Madeleine Richard	Jean Delannoy	with Jean Gabin
1953	The Proud and the Beautiful	Nelly	Yves Allégret	with Gérard Philipe
1954	Love, Soldiers and Women	Joan of Arc	Jean Delannoy	episode "Jeanne"
1954	Obsession	Hélène Giovanni	Jean Delannoy	based on a novel by Cornell Woolrich
1954	Napoléon	Joséphine de Beauharnais	Sacha Guitry	Daniel Gélin/Raymond Pellegrin as Napoléon
1955	The Grand Maneuver	Marie-Louise Rivière	René Clair	with Gérard Philipe
1955	Marguerite of the Night	Marguerite	Claude Autant-Lara	with Yves Montand
1955	Marie Antoinette Queen of France	Marie-Antoinette, Queen of France	Jean Delannoy	with Richard Todd
1955	If Paris Were Told to Us	Gabrielle d'Estrées	Sacha Guitry	portraying the mistress of Henry IV of France
1956	Oasis	Françoise Lignières	Yves Allégret	with Pierre Brasseur
1957	The Vintage	Léonne Morel	Jeffrey Hayden	with Mel Ferrer
1957	There's Always a Price Tag	Hélène Fréminger	Denys de La Patellière	with Daniel Gélin and Peter van Eyck
1958	The Mirror Has Two Faces	Marie-Josée Tardivet, Pierre's wife	André Cayatte	with Bourvil and Ivan Desny
1958	Maxime	Jacqueline Monneron	Henri Verneuil	with Charles Boyer
1958	Girls for the Summer	Micheline	Gianni Franciolini	comedy with Alberto Sordi
1959	Menschen im Hotel	La Grusinskaïa	Gottfried Reinhardt	with O. W. Fischer
1959	Winter Holidays	Steffa Tardier	Camillo Mastrocinque	with Georges Marchal
1959	The Wretches	Thelma Rooland	Robert Hossein	with Olivier Hussenot
1959	Why Do You Come So Late?	Catherine Ferrer	Henri Decoin	with Henri Vidal
1960	Fortunat	Juliette Valcourt	Alex Joffé	title character played by Bourvil
1961	Three Faces of Sin	Renée Plège	François Villiers	with Jean-Claude Brialy
1961	The Lions Are Loose	Cécile	Henri Verneuil	with Jean-Claude Brialy
1962	Landru	Célestine Buisson	Claude Chabrol	with Charles Denner
1962	Meetings	Bella Krastner	Philippe Agostini	with Gabriele Ferzetti
1962	Crime Does Not Pay	Jeanne Hugues	Gérard Oury	episode "The Hugues Case"
1962	The Winner	As herself	François Reichenbach	Louis Delluc Prize, Golden Leopard
1963	Be Careful Ladies	Denise Duparc	André Hunebelle	with Paul Meurisse
1963	Web of Fear	Constance	François Villiers	with Dany Saval
1964	Marked Eyes	Florence	Robert Hossein	starring the film's director
1964	The Last Steps	Yolande Simonet	Jacques Robin	with Jean-Louis Trintignant
1964	The Scapegoat	Princess Sofia	Duccio Tessari	based on a novel by Francesco Dall'Ongaro
1965	Tell Me Whom to Kill	Geneviève Montanet	Étienne Périer	with Paul Hubschmid
1966	Lost Command	The Countess of Clairfond	Mark Robson	with Anthony Quinn
1967	La Bien-aimée	Fanny Dréal	Jacques Doniol-Valcroze	TV film
1967	The Diary of an Innocent Boy	The Countess	Michel Deville	with Pierre Clémenti and Michel Piccoli
1975	Cat and Mouse	Madame Richard	Claude Lelouch	with Serge Reggiani
1986	Le Tiroir secret	Colette Dutilleul-Lemarchand	Édouard Molinaro, Roger Gillioz, Michel Boisrond, Nadine Trintignant	TV miniseries, 6 episodes
1990	Everybody's Fine	A woman in the train	Giuseppe Tornatore	with Marcello Mastroianni

== Trivia ==
The former President of Chile Michelle Bachelet was named after Michèle Morgan.

She almost played Ilsa Lund in Casablanca.
