= Dan Turner, Hollywood Detective =

Fictional private detective

- Cover of High Adventure #60 (September 2001), featuring Dan Turner, Hollywood Detective

Publication information
- Publisher: Culture Publications
- First appearance: Spicy Detective #2

Dan Turner, also known as the Hollywood Detective, was a fictional private detective created by Robert Leslie Bellem. His first appearance was in the second issue of the pulp magazine Spicy Detective, dated June 1934, and he continued to appear regularly in that magazine (which was retitled Speed Detective in 1943) until its demise in February 1947. He also appeared in his "own" magazine, Hollywood Detective, which was published by Culture Publications (later Trojan Publishing) and ran from January 1942 to October 1950.

== Character ==
Dan Turner was a typical hardboiled private eye, who worked in the Hollywood area of Los Angeles. Most of the stories are set in and around the film studios, and focus on crimes involving people in the movie business – film stars, stuntmen, producers, agents, extras and an endless array of glamorous female "starlets". The Dan Turner stories were notorious for their emphasis on sexual content, although this was generally implied rather than described explicitly.

A large number of the Dan Turner stories were written by Bellem himself, who had a good inside knowledge of Hollywood having worked as a film extra. The Hollywood Detective magazine also featured a Dan Turner comic strip, drawn by Max Plaisted. Adolphe Barreaux, who drew the much racier Sally The Sleuth, was the first to draw Bellem's stories for Dan Turner, Hollywood Detective in the 1940s.

All the Dan Turner stories are written in the first person, in a racy, slang-ridden style that gives them a unique flavor. Guns are never "guns" but "roscoes", and they always go "ka-chow!". A woman is never simply a "woman" but a "dame", "frail", "quail", "wren" or, if particularly attractive, a "doll" or "cutie".

In his comic essay, "Somewhere A Roscoe...," humorist S.J. Perelman both praises and skewers the Dan Turner mysteries. In the essay, Perelman says of Culture Publications, Inc., "In Spicy Detective, they have achieved the sauciest blend of libido and murder this side of Gilles de Rais. They have juxtaposed the steely automatic and the frilly pantie and found that it pays off. Above all, they have given the world Dan Turner, the apotheosis of all private detectives."

Using quotes taken from various Dan Turner mysteries in Spicy Detective, Perelman pokes fun at Turner's hard-boiled character. (After finding a female body in his closet in "Corpse in the Closet", Dan Turner observes, "It's a damned screwy feeling to reach for pajamas and find a cadaver instead." Perelman comments on this, "Mr. Turner, you will perceive, is a man of sentiment.") (Likewise, in comics, Dan says things like, "She's deader than a Nazi's conscience!")

Perelman also quotes several murder scenes from several different Dan Turner mysteries, noting that they all bear a remarkable similarity. The murder scenes always involve a "roscoe" which says "Ka-chow!," "Chow! Chow!," or "Wh-r-r-ang!" After the body hits the floor, Dan Turner always comments that the victim is "as dead as an iced catfish" or "as dead as vaudeville" or "as dead as a smoked herring".

"The murders," Perelman notes, "follow an exact, rigid pattern, almost like the ritual of a bullfight or a Chinese play."

"The only other recurring character in the series was his pal, and sometime-rival, Lieutenant Dave Donaldson of the homicide squad, whose chief purpose seemed to be to get the bodies hauled away."

== On film ==
Despite his Hollywood connections, Dan Turner appeared in only one movie during his magazine existence, namely Blackmail (1947), based on one of Bellem's stories. Much later, in 1990, Marc Singer played the character in The Raven Red Kiss-Off, also known by the alternate title of Dan Turner, Hollywood Detective. The screenplay was written by John Wooley, and based on the Dan Turner short story "Homicide Highball" by Robert Leslie Bellem, originally published in the February 1950 issue of Hollywood Detective.
