= Françoise Parturier =

French writer and journalist

Françoise Parturier (1919 – 12 August 1995) was a French writer and journalist. She was the first "symbolic" female candidate for the Académie Française in 1970.

The daughter of a medical doctor, she was born in Paris and studied at the University of Paris. In 1947, she married Jean Gatichon. She began a career in journalism after World War II. From 1950 to 1951, Parturier taught contemporary literature in the United States. She was a regular contributor to Le Figaro from 1956 to 1975. Parturier wrote three books in partnership with Josette Raoul-Duval under the nom de plume "Nicole". In 1959, she began writing under her own name.

Parturier died at Neuilly at the age of 75.

== Selected works ==
- Les lions sont lâchés (1955) with Josette Raoul-Duval as "Nicole"; 1961 film
- L'Amant de cinq jours (1959); 1971 film
- Marianne m'a dit (1963)
- Lettre ouverte aux hommes (1968)
- L'Amour ? le plaisir ? (1968)
- Lettre ouverte aux femmes (1974)
- La Lettre d'Irlande (1979)
- Les Hauts de Ramatuelle (1983)
