= Moka (film) =

- Film poster
- Directed by: Frédéric Mermoud
- Written by: Tatiana de Rosnay; Frédéric Mermoud; Antonin Martin-Hilbert; Jean-Stéphane Bron
- Based on: Moka by Tatiana de Rosnay
- Produced by: Julien Rouch; Damien Couvreur; Tonie Marshall; Jean-Stéphane Bron; Adrian Blaser
- Starring: Emmanuelle Devos; Nathalie Baye
- Cinematography: Irina Lubtchansky
- Edited by: Sarah Anderson
- Music by: Christian Garcia Gaucher
- Production companies: Diligence Films; Bande à part Films; Tabo Tabo Films; Sampek Productions; RTS Radio Télévision Suisse
- Distributed by: Pyramide Distribution (France)
- Release date: 17 August 2016
- Running time: 92 minutes
- Countries: France; Switzerland
- Language: French

Moka is a 2016 Franco-Swiss drama film directed by Frédéric Mermoud and based on the novel of the same name by Tatiana de Rosnay. Starring Emmanuelle Devos and Nathalie Baye, it follows a woman searching for the driver responsible for her son’s death. The film was screened in the Piazza Grande section of the 2016 Locarno Film Festival, where it won the Variety Piazza Grande Award.

== Synopsis ==
After the death of her son in a hit-and-run involving a mocha-coloured car, Diane Kramer leaves Lausanne to find the driver responsible. Her search leads her to Evian, where she becomes entangled in the lives of the car’s owners.

== Cast ==
The cast includes:

- Emmanuelle Devos as Diane/Hélène
- Nathalie Baye as Marlène
- David Clavel as Michel
- Diane Rouxel as Élodie
- Olivier Chantreau as Vincent

== Production ==
The screenplay was adapted by Frédéric Mermoud and Antonin Martin-Hilbert from Tatiana de Rosnay’s novel of the same name. Filming began in Haute-Savoie on 8 September 2015, with a 35-day shoot in the Lake Geneva area, including Evian and Lausanne.

== Reception ==
Variety described Moka as an “elegantly lean, low-temperature thriller”, and praised Devos’s performance, Mermoud’s minimal direction, and the film’s sound design. Filmdienst described the film as a restrained, at times austere and well-acted melodrama, and said that it explored the fractures and emotional depths in the thoughts and feelings of a deeply despairing woman. Cineuropa described it as “a surprising and ever-so-slightly twisted thriller”, praising Devos’s performance, Lubtchansky’s cinematography, and the film’s quiet, slowly developing tension. The Hollywood Reporter described the film as a “lean but skillful adaptation” and a psychological thriller, and said Devos and Baye were both impressive.

== Awards and nominations ==
Award / Film Festival	Category	Recipients and nominees	Result
Locarno Film Festival	Variety Piazza Grande Award		Won
Swiss Film Award	Best Screenplay	Frédéric Mermoud	Nominated

== Festival screenings ==
In 2016, Moka was screened at the 69th Locarno Film Festival and was later shown at festivals including the 32nd Haifa International Film Festival and the 33rd Französische Filmtage Tübingen. In 2017, it was shown at festivals including the 52nd Solothurn Film Festival and the 43rd Seattle International Film Festival.
