= Pentimento (film) =

- Directed by: Tonie Marshall
- Written by: Tonie Marshall; Sylvie Granotier
- Produced by: Charles Gassot; Laurent Ferrier
- Starring: Patricia Dinev; Antoine de Caunes; Magali Noël
- Cinematography: Pascal Lebègue
- Edited by: Luc Barnier
- Music by: Steve Beresford
- Production companies: Telema; FR3 Films Production
- Distributed by: AMLF
- Release date: 13 December 1989
- Running time: 90 minutes
- Country: France
- Language: French

Pentimento is a 1989 French comedy film directed and written by Tonie Marshall. It was the debut of Marshall as director.

== Synopsis ==
Lucie (Patricia Dinev) finds out that her father, whom she never knew, recently died. She reaches out how to go to his funeral and she rushes to the cemetery. She arrives at the ceremony and falls in love with a man that could be her brother. Lucie later discovers that she went to the wrong part of the graveyard and she was not related to anybody at the funeral.

== Cast ==
- Patricia Dinev
- Antoine de Caunes
- Magali Noël
