= William Marshall (bandleader) =

American singer and bandleader (1917–1994)

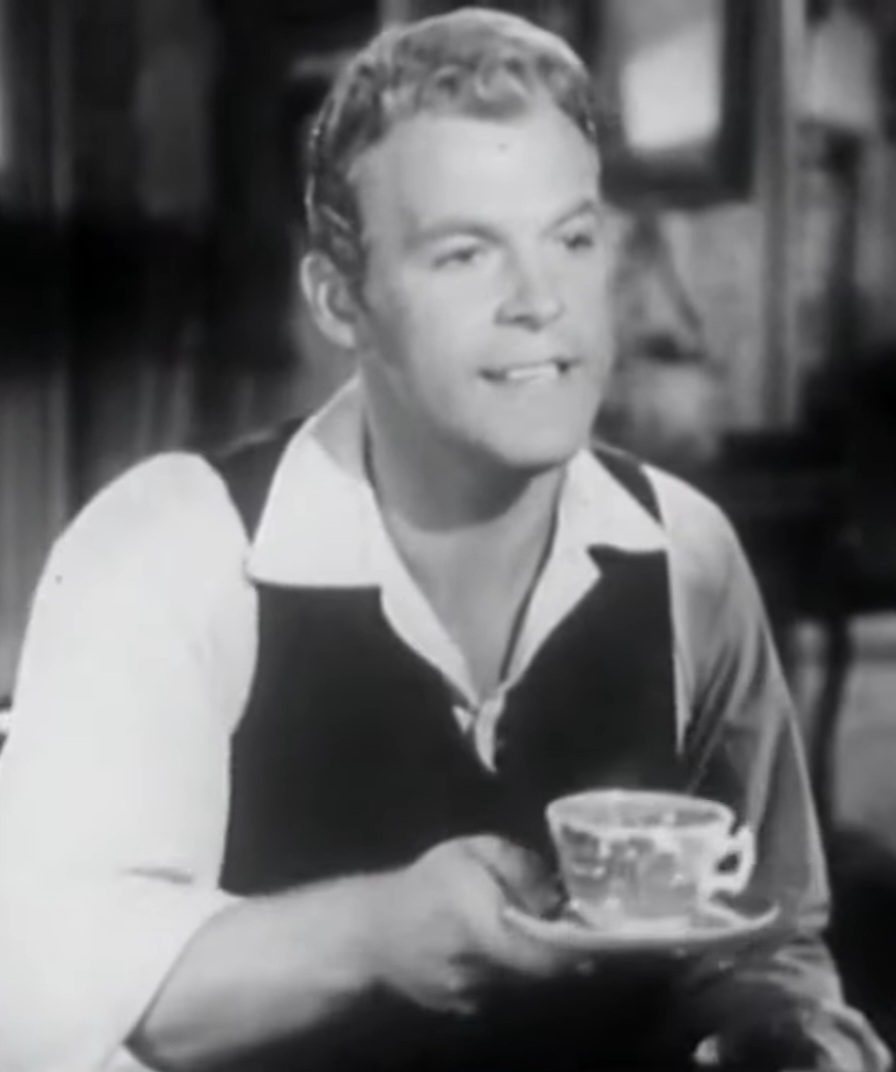
- Marshall in Calendar Girl (1947)
- Born: Gerard William Marshall; October 12, 1917; Chicago, Illinois, U.S.
- Died: June 7, 1994 (aged 76); Boulogne-Billancourt, France
- Other name: Bill Marshall
- Occupations: Actor; pianist; film director
- Years active: 1937–1964
- Spouses: Beverly Bruce (m. 1938; div. 1940); Michèle Morgan (m. 1942; div. 1948); Micheline Presle (m. 1949; div. 1955); Ginger Rogers (m. 1961; div. 1970)
- Children: Mike; Tonie

Gerard William Marshall (October 12, 1917 – June 7, 1994) was an American singer, bandleader and a motion picture actor, director and producer.

== Biography ==
Born in Chicago, Illinois on October 12, 1917, Marshall became a vocalist for Fred Waring and his band, The Pennsylvanians, before forming his own band in 1937. In 1940, he moved to Hollywood to act in films.

Some of the movies Marshall appeared in include Calendar Girl, That Brennan Girl, Belle of the Yukon, Knute Rockne, All American, State Fair (1945), and as pulp-magazine character Dan Turner, Hollywood Detective in the 1947 film Blackmail.

=== Personal life and death ===
Marshall married Beverly Bruce on December 5, 1938, in Marion, Arkansas. They were divorced on June 7, 1940. After that, he was married three times to actresses.

1. Michèle Morgan (September 16, 1942–1948) — son Mike Marshall, actor
2. Micheline Presle (1949–1955) — daughter Tonie Marshall, film director
3. Ginger Rogers (1961–1970)

Marshall died in Boulogne-Billancourt (France) on June 7, 1994, at the age of 76.

== See also ==
- Les Impures (1954)
- Quick, Let's Get Married (1964)
