= Billeter =

Billeter is a surname. Notable people with the surname include:

- Hans Billeter (1880–1930), Swiss footballer
- Jean François Billeter (born 1939), Swiss sinologist
- Julius Billeter Jr. (1869–1957), Swiss genealogist
- Tom Billeter (born 1961), American college basketball coach

== See also ==
- Billet (disambiguation)
