= Ballet (disambiguation) =

Ballet is a formalized kind of performance dance.

Ballet may also refer to:

- Ballet company, a group of dancers who perform ballet
  - Ballet dancer, individual performer

== Music ==
- Ballet (music), a form of musical composition that corresponds to the dance form
- "Le ballet" by Celine Dion, 1996
- "Le ballet", song by Patrick Juvet, 1979

== Film ==
- Ballet (film), a 1995 documentary by Frederick Wiseman about the American Ballet Theatre

== People with the surname ==
- Bernard Ballet (1941–2022), French actor and director
- Élisabeth Ballet (born 1956), French sculptor
- Françoise Ballet-Blu (born 1964), French politician
- Gilbert Ballet (1853–1916), French psychiatrist, neurologist and historian
- Pascale Ballet (born 1953), French Egyptologist
- René Ballet (1928–2017), French journalist, novelist and essayist
- Samuel Ballet (born 2001), Swiss footballer

== See also ==
- Ballet terms
- Balat (disambiguation)
