= Balat =

Balat may refer to:

== Places ==
- Balat, Fatih, a neighborhood in the historic part of Istanbul, Turkey
- Balat, Didim, Turkey
- Balat, Bihar, India
- Balat, Meghalaya, India
- Balat, a settlement and archaeological site in Dakhla Oasis, Egypt
- Ba Lạt, a seaport in Vietnam at the Red River (Asia)

== People ==
- See Balat (surname)

== Other ==
- BALaT, an image database maintained by the Royal Institute for Cultural Heritage in Belgium

== See also ==
- Ba'alat Gebal, the goddess of the city of Byblos, Phoenicia in ancient times
