= Alexandre Mattiussi =

French fashion designer (born 1980)

- Born: September 15, 1980 (age 45); Normandy, France
- Education: École Duperré
- Occupation: Fashion designer
- Known for: Founder of AMI Paris
- Awards: ANDAM Grand Prize (2013)

Alexandre Mattiussi (born September 15, 1980) is a French fashion designer and entrepreneur who is the founder of AMI, a French luxury ready-to-wear menswear brand. He previously designed for Dior Homme, Givenchy, and Marc Jacobs.

Born and raised in Normandy to an Italian father and a French mother, he founded AMI in late 2010 and presented its first collection in 2011. He won the ANDAM Grand Prize in 2013 and presided over the competition's jury in 2026.

== Early career ==
Mattiussi was born on September 15, 1980, and grew up in Normandy; his father was Italian and his mother French. He studied fashion and design at the École Duperré and specialized in men's fashion.

He went on to work for Christian Dior 's "30 Montaigne" men's line, Givenchy as first assistant for men, and Marc Jacobs.

He spent more than five years at Givenchy, where he specialized in men's tailoring, and afterwards worked on the Marc Jacobs men's line, dividing his time between Paris, Milan and New York.

== AMI Paris ==
In late 2010, he founded AMI Paris, quickly gaining international success. In December 2012, the brand opened its first boutique in Paris. The label's name combines the designer's initials with the last letter of his surname, and is also the French word for "friend," a reference to his stated aim of dressing his own circle; the full brand name adds "Paris."

In 2013, he won the ANDAM from Association Nationale pour le Développement des Arts de la Mode for AMI. In 2016, he became a member of Fédération de la Haute Couture et de la Mode. Mattiussi extended the label to womenswear in 2018.

As of 2021, AMI Paris has six boutiques in Europe (including 3 own boutiques and 3 corners), 1 boutique in the United States in New York, 8 boutiques in China, 6 boutiques in Japan. In 2024, that had grown to more than 60 standalone stores and more than 700 points of sale.

In January 2021, the venture capital firm Sequoia Capital China acquired a controlling stake in AMI; Mattiussi remained president and artistic director, and Nicolas Santi-Weil remained chief executive. At the time of the deal the company reported annual revenue above €50 million, more than 50 percent higher than the previous year. Revenue rose from €35 million in 2019 to €230 million in 2022, by which point the label ran 58 single-brand stores, employed about 500 people and was stocked by 700 independent retailers in more than 120 countries.

AMI took its first outside investment in 2012 from the Mode et Finance fund backed by Bpifrance, followed by a round led by Neo, and added the London firm Felix Capital as a shareholder at the end of 2022. Mattiussi has run the company with chief executive Nicolas Santi-Weil, who joined in 2013; the two structured their shareholder agreements so as to keep creative and operational control through successive funding rounds. Revenue reached more than €300 million in 2023, and by early 2026 the company employed about 830 people worldwide, held 650 wholesale accounts and ran 70 retail sites, with roughly two-thirds of sales direct to consumer.

In June 2022, Mattiussi staged AMI's spring/summer 2023 show in front of the Sacré-Cœur basilica in Montmartre. The actress Audrey Tautou opened the show, and Naomi Campbell and Carla Bruni were among those in attendance.

AMI's headquarters occupy a building on the Place des Victoires in Paris that Mattiussi first visited in 2011, before the label existed, and the brand showed its spring 2026 collection on the square itself, with models circling the statue of Louis XIV at its center. In June 2026 the label opened a store across the square from its offices, pairing a ground-floor retail space with a second-floor showroom, and Mattiussi curated a selection of vintage design objects and photographs to show alongside the collection.

== Design approach ==
Mattiussi has described his aim as making dependable, uncomplicated clothes for everyday wear rather than conceptual or provocative fashion, and has said he deliberately avoided positioning himself as a political or conceptual designer. He characterizes the label's market position as "friendly luxury": buying from the same Italian mills used by larger fashion houses while holding retail prices below the upper end of the market by manufacturing in Portugal and eastern Europe.

== Other activities ==
Mattiussi has been reported to have a lifelong passion for cinema. In 2024, he directed the music video for the single "Où tu ne m'attendais pas" by Isabelle Adjani with Christophe (posthumously). Mattiussi was the subject of Dominique Miceli's documentary Alexandre Mattiussi, Ami, naissance d'une collection, which followed the making of AMI's fall/winter 2024 menswear collection over 120 days and was scheduled for broadcast on Paris Première on June 16, 2024.

== Awards and recognition ==
Mattiussi received the ANDAM Grand Prize in 2013, presented to him by Pierre Bergé.

In January 2026 he was named president of the jury for ANDAM's 37th edition and mentor to the Grand Prize winner. At the ceremony held in the gardens of the Palais-Royal on July 1, 2026, the Grand Prize went to the Belgian designer Marie Adam-Leenaerdt.
