= Isabelle Adjani =

French actress (born 1955)

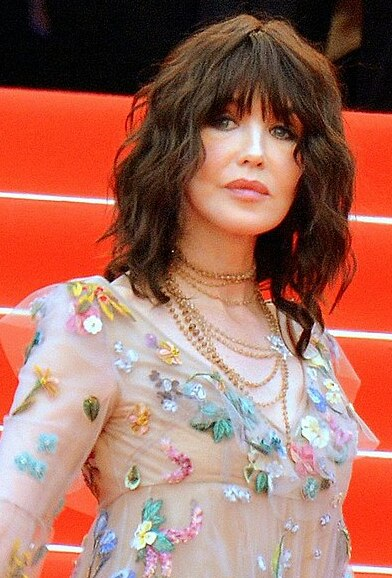
- Adjani at the 2018 Cannes Film Festival
- Born: Isabelle Yasmine Adjani; 27 June 1955 (age 71); Paris, France
- Occupations: Actress; singer
- Years active: 1970–present
- Partners: Bruno Nuytten (1976–1981); Daniel Day-Lewis (1989–1995)
- Children: 2
- Awards: Full list

Isabelle Yasmine Adjani (French pronunciation: [izabɛl adʒani]; born 27 June 1955) is a French actress and singer, known for portraying tragic and emotionally complex characters across various genres, particularly psychological films. She has received various accolades, including five César Awards, a Lumière Award and a Best Actress Award at the Cannes Film Festival, along with nominations for two Academy Awards. Adjani was made a Chevalier of the Légion d'honneur in 2010 and a Commandeur of the Ordre des Arts et des Lettres in 2014.

Adjani has won a record five Césars for Best Actress for Possession (1981), One Deadly Summer (1983), Camille Claudel (1988), La Reine Margot (1994), and La Journée de la jupe (2009). Her other César-nominated roles were in The Story of Adèle H. (1975), Barocco (1976), Subway (1985), and The World Is Yours (2018). Other notable films include The Slap (1974), The Tenant (1976), The Driver (1978), Nosferatu the Vampyre (1979), All Fired Up (1982), Deadly Circuit (1983), Ishtar (1987), Diabolique (1996), Adolphe (2002), Bon voyage (2003), French Women (2014), and Peter von Kant (2022).

Adjani came to international prominence for her portrayal of Adèle Hugo in The Story of Adele H., for which she was nominated for the Academy Award for Best Actress at age 20, becoming the youngest nominee in the category at the time. She later collected a second Best Actress nomination for portraying Camille Claudel in Camille Claudel, thus becoming the first French actress to receive two Academy Award nominations for foreign-language films. Adjani also won the Cannes Film Festival's Best Actress Award for her performances in Possession and Quartet (1981), which makes her the only actress to win a joint award for two films in the same competition slate, and the Berlinale's Silver Bear for Best Actress for Camille Claudel.

== Early life and education ==
Isabelle Yasmine Adjani was born on 27 June 1955 in the 17th arrondissement of Paris, to Mohammed Cherif Adjani, an Algerian Muslim from Constantine, and Emma Augusta "Gusti" Schweinberger, a German Catholic from Bavaria.

Adjani's parents met near the end of World War II, when her father was in the French Army and stationed in Germany. They married and her mother returned with him to Paris, despite not speaking a word of French. She asked him to take Cherif as his first name as she thought it sounded more "American".

Isabelle grew up bilingual, speaking French and German fluently, in Gennevilliers, a northwestern suburb of Paris, where her father worked in a garage. After winning a school recitation contest, Adjani began acting by the age of 12 in amateur theater. She successfully passed her baccalauréat and was auditing classes at the University of Vincennes in 1976.

Adjani had a younger brother, Éric, who was a photographer. He died on 25 December 2010, aged 53.

== Acting career ==
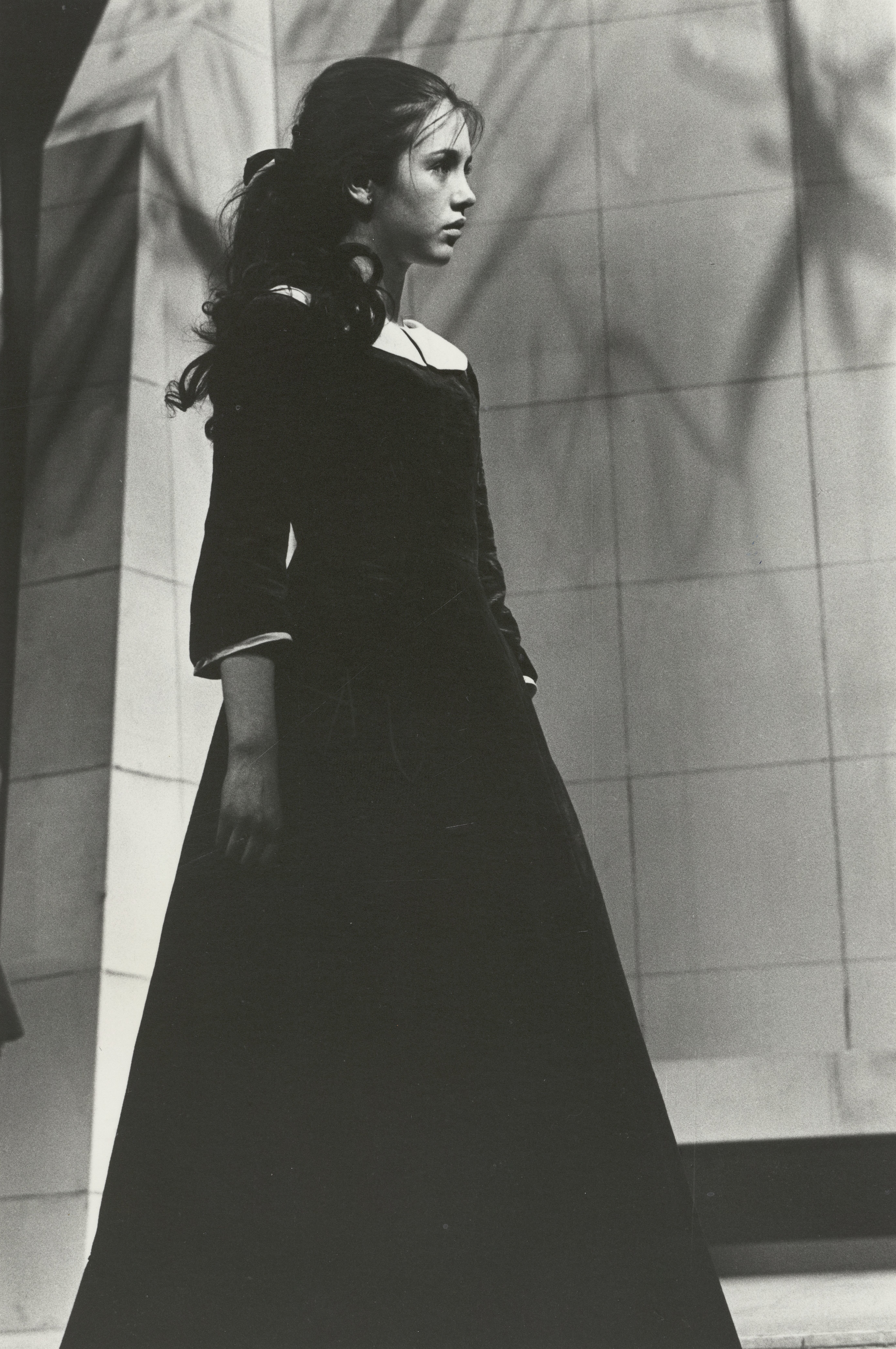
Adjani in L'École des femmes, 1973

At the age of 14, Adjani starred in her first motion picture, Le Petit Bougnat (1970). She first gained fame as a classical actress at the Comédie-Française, which she joined in 1972. She was praised for her interpretation of Agnès, the main female role in Molière's L'École des femmes. She soon left the theatre to pursue a film career.

After minor roles in several films, she enjoyed modest success in the 1974 film La Gifle (The Slap), which François Truffaut saw. He immediately cast her in her first major role in The Story of Adèle H. (1975), a project that he had finished writing five years prior but had waited to cast the right actress for the part. Critics unanimously praised her performance, with the American critic Pauline Kael describing her acting talents as "prodigious".

Only 19 when she made the film, Adjani was nominated for the Academy Award for Best Actress in a Leading Role, becoming the youngest Best Actress nominee at the time (a record she held for almost 30 years). She quickly received offers for roles in Hollywood films, such as Walter Hill's 1978 crime thriller The Driver. She had previously turned down the chance to star in films like The Other Side of Midnight. She had described Hollywood as a "city of fiction" and said, "I'm not an American. I didn't grow up with that will to win an award." Truffaut on the other hand said, "France is too small for her. I think Isabelle is made for American cinema." She agreed to make The Driver because she was an admirer of Hill's first film Hard Times. Adjani said:

I think he is wonderful, very much in the tradition of Howard Hawks, lean and spare. The story is contemporary but also very stylized, and the roles that Ryan and I play are like Bogart and Bacall. We are both gamblers in our souls and we do not show our emotions or say a lot. For us, talk is cheap. I am really quite a mysterious girl in this film, with no name and no background. And I must say that it is restful not to have a life behind me; this way, I don't have to dig deep to play the part. All I know is that life for me is gambling and I am a loser. I have what people call a poker face.

The film was seen more than 1.1 million times in Adjani's native France but did not do as well in the US.

She played Lucy in the German director Werner Herzog's 1979 remake of Nosferatu which was well-received critically and performed well at box offices in Europe. Roger Ebert loved the film, calling Herzog's casting of Adjani one of his "masterstrokes" in the film. He wrote that she "is used here not only for her facial perfection but for her curious quality of seeming to exist on an ethereal plane." The cast and the crew filmed both English- and German-language versions simultaneously upon request of 20th Century Fox, the American distributor, as Kinski and Bruno Ganz could act more confidently in their native language.

In 1981, she received a double Cannes Film Festival's Best Actress award for her roles in the Merchant Ivory film Quartet, based on the novel by Jean Rhys, and in the horror film Possession, directed by Andrzej Żuławski. For her performance in the latter film, she received her first César Award in 1982.

In 1983, she won her second César for her depiction of a vengeful woman in the French blockbuster One Deadly Summer, and starred with Michel Serrault in the thriller Deadly Circuit directed by Claude Miller. That same year, Adjani released the French pop album Pull marine, written and produced by Serge Gainsbourg. She then starred in a music video for the hit title song, Pull Marine, which was directed by Luc Besson.

Adjani also drew controversy at the 1983 Cannes Film Festival when she refused to attend a traditional photocall after the press conference for One Deadly Summer. Adjani was annoyed at the time by the intrusion of photographers into her private life. The photographers in Cannes boycotted Adjani upon her arrival on the red carpet for the premiere, at which point they put down their cameras and turned their backs to her.

In 1988, she co-produced and starred in a biopic of the sculptor Camille Claudel. She received her third César and second Oscar nomination for her role in the film, becoming the first French actress to receive two Oscar nominations for French movies. The film was also nominated for the Academy Award for Best Foreign Language Film.

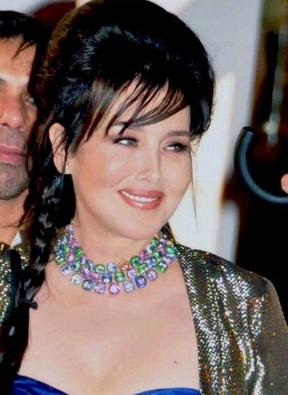
Adjani at the 2010 César Awards

She received her fourth César for the 1994 film Queen Margot, an ensemble epic directed by Patrice Chéreau. She received her fifth César for Skirt Day (2009), the most that any actress has received. The film features her as a middle school teacher in a troubled French suburb who takes her class hostage when she accidentally fires off a gun she found on one of her students. It was premiered on the French Arte channel on 20 March 2009, attaining a record 2.2 million viewers) and then in movie theaters on 25 March 2009. The film was her return to the cinema after eight years of absence.

In 2010, she made an appearance in the social comedy Mammuth, from directors Benoît Delépine and Gustave Kervern, and in which she played the phantom of Gérard Depardieu's first love. The same year, she lent her voice to the character of Mother Gothel in the French version of the animated film Tangled. In 2011, she co-starred in De Force, the first film directed by Frank Henry. She embodied the commander Clara Damico, head of the brigade for the repression of banditry.

She became the first French actress to star in a Bollywood film, playing the mother of Preity Zinta in the 2013 romantic comedy Ishkq in Paris, directed by Prem Soni and alongside Shekhar Kapur.

She joined the comedy The World Is Yours, playing the eccentric Dany, directed by Romain Gavras alongside Vincent Cassel, which entered into the Directors' Fortnight during the 2018 Cannes Film Festival.

In 2022, she played the movie star Sidonie von Grassenabb in the comedy drama Peter von Kant, tribute to Rainer Werner Fassbinder's The Bitter Tears of Petra von Kant, directed by François Ozon alongside Denis Ménochet, which entered as the opening film into the 72nd Berlin International Film Festival.

In 2023, Adjani released her second French pop album Bande originale, written and produced by Pascal Obispo, and arranged by Cécile DeLaurentis. She also joined the Netflix action film Wingwomen, directed by Mélanie Laurent, and then, the Netflix miniseries The Perfect Couple directed by Susanne Bier, alongside Nicole Kidman and Liev Schreiber.

== Personal life ==
In 1979, Adjani had a son, Barnabé Saïd Nuytten, with the cinematographer Bruno Nuytten. She later hired Nuytten to direct her project Camille Claudel, a biopic of the sculptor who was the lover of Rodin.

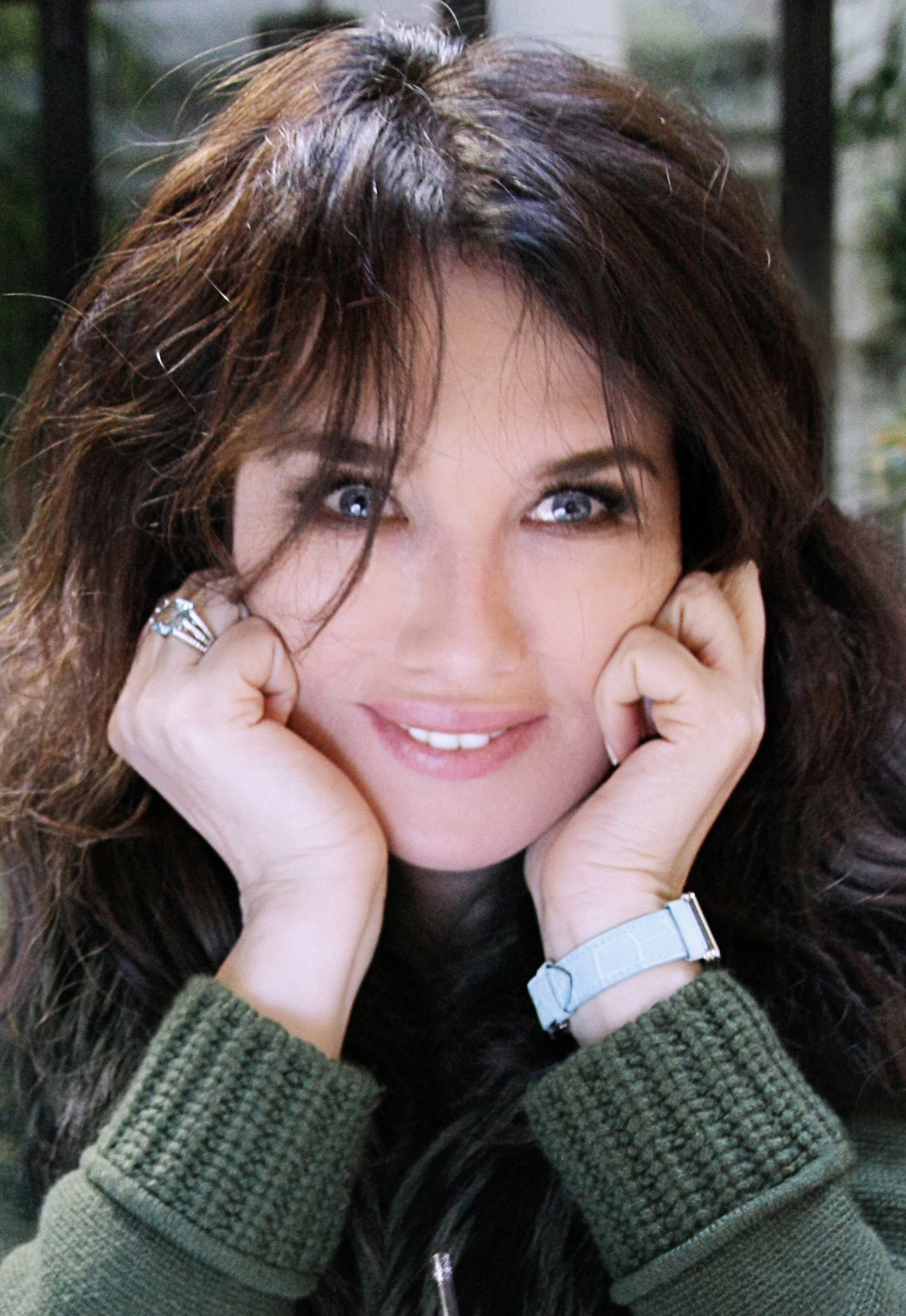
Isabelle Adjani in 2012

During the mid-eighties, she had a relationship with Warren Beatty. He convinced her to appear with him in the epic comedy Ishtar, directed by Elaine May, co-starring Dustin Hoffman, and shot in Morocco.

From 1989 to 1995, she had a relationship with Daniel Day-Lewis, which ended before the birth of their son, Gabriel-Kane Day-Lewis, in 1995.

Adjani was later engaged to the composer Jean-Michel Jarre; they broke up in 2004.

On 14 December 2023, Adjani was handed a two-year suspended sentence for tax fraud.

=== Views ===
Adjani has been vocal against anti-immigrant and anti-Algerian sentiments in France. In 2009, she criticized statements by Pope Benedict XVI, who claimed that condoms are not an effective method of AIDS prevention.

In September 2009, she signed a petition in support of Roman Polanski, calling for his release after he was arrested in Switzerland in relation to his sexual abuse case.

In 2017, Adjani was interviewed by Vincent Josse on the French public radio station France Inter. During the interview, she expressed her vaccine hesitancy and opposition to mandatory vaccination.

In 2012, she was swindled out of several hundred thousand euros by Étienne Binant, an associate of Jeffrey Epstein.

In 2018 Adjani signed a letter calling to act "firmly and immediately" for stopping climate change and biodiversity loss.

== Performances and works ==
=== Film ===
Year	Title	Role	Director	Notes
1970	Le Petit bougnat	Rose	Bernard Toublanc-Michel	
1972	Faustine et le Bel Été	Camille	Nina Companeez	Out of Competition – 25th Cannes International Film Festival
1974	The Slap	Isabelle Doulean	Claude Pinoteau	
1974	Ariane	Ariane	Pierre-Jean de San Bartolomé	
1975	The Story of Adele H.	Adèle Hugo	François Truffaut	In Competition – 23rd San Sebastián International Film Festival
1976	The Tenant	Stella	Roman Polanski	In Competition – 29th Cannes International Film Festival
1976	Barocco	Laure	André Téchiné	
1977	Violette et François	Violette Clot	Jacques Rouffio	
1978	The Driver	The Player	Walter Hill	
1979	Nosferatu the Vampyre	Lucy Harker	Werner Herzog	In Competition – 29th Berlin International Film Festival
1979	The Brontë Sisters	Emily Brontë	André Téchiné	In Competition – 32nd Cannes International Film Festival
1981	Clara et les Chics Types	Clara	Jacques Monnet	
1981	Possession	Anna/Helen	Andrzej Żuławski	In Competition – 34th Cannes International Film Festival
1981	Quartet	Marya "Mado" Zelli	James Ivory	In Competition – 34th Cannes International Film Festival
1981	L'Année prochaine... si tout va bien	Isabelle Maréchal	Jean-Loup Hubert	
1982	All Fired Up	Pauline Valance	Jean-Paul Rappeneau	
1982	The Last Horror Film	Herself	David Winters	
1982	Antonieta	Antonieta Rivas Mercado	Carlos Saura	
1983	Deadly Circuit	Catherine Leiris/Lucie, 'Marie'	Claude Miller	
1983	One Deadly Summer	Eliane known as 'Elle'	Jean Becker	In Competition – 36th Cannes International Film Festival
1985	Subway	Héléna	Luc Besson	
1986	T'as de beaux escaliers tu sais	Herself	Agnès Varda	Short film Special Screenings section – 39th Cannes International Film Festival
1987	Ishtar	Shirra Assel	Elaine May	
1988	Camille Claudel	Camille Claudel	Bruno Nuytten	Also executive producer In Competition – 39th Berlin International Film Festival
1990	Lung Ta: Les cavaliers du vent	Narrator	Marie-Jaoul de Poncheville; Franz-Christoph Giercke	Documentary
1993	Toxic Affair	Pénélope	Philomène Esposito	Out of Competition – 46th Cannes International Film Festival
1994	La Reine Margot	Margot	Patrice Chéreau	In Competition – 47th Cannes International Film Festival
1996	Diabolique	Mia Baran	Jeremiah S. Chechik	
1998	Paparazzi	Herself	Alain Berbérian	
2002	The Repentant	Charlotte/Leïla	Laetitia Masson	
2002	Adolphe	Ellénore	Benoît Jacquot	
2003	Bon Voyage	Viviane Denvers	Jean-Paul Rappeneau	Gala Presentations section – 28th Toronto International Film Festival
2003	Monsieur Ibrahim	The Star	François Dupeyron	Out of Competition – 60th Venice International Film Festival
2009	La Journée de la jupe	Sonia Bergerac	Jean-Paul Lilienfeld	Panorama section – 59th Berlin International Film Festival
2010	Mammuth	The Lost Love of Serge	Gustave Kervern; Benoît Delépine	In Competition – 60th Berlin International Film Festival
2010	Tangled	Mother Gothel	Nathan Greno; Byron Howard	Voice dub for French version; animated film
2011	De Force	Clara Damico	Frank Henry	
2012	David et Madame Hansen	Madame Hansen-Bergmann	Alexandre Astier	
2013	Ishkq in Paris	Marie Elise	Prem Raj	
2014	French Women	Lili	Audrey Dana	
2016	Carole Matthieu	Carole Matthieu	Louis-Julien Petit	Also associate producer
2018	The World Is Yours	Dany	Romain Gavras	Director's Fortnight section – 71st Cannes International Film Festival
2021	Soeurs	Zorah	Yamina Benguigui	
2022	Peter von Kant	Sidonie von Grassenabb	François Ozon	In Competition – 72nd Berlin International Film Festival
2022	Masquerade	Martha	Nicolas Bedos	Out of Competition – 75th Cannes International Film Festival
2023	Dammi	Herself	Yann Demange	Short film Piazza Grande section – 76th Locarno Film Festival
2023	Wingwomen	Marraine	Mélanie Laurent	
2023	Wish	Queen Amaya	Chris Buck; Fawn Veerasunthorn	Voice dub for French version; animated film
2025	Natacha, presque hôtesse de l'air	Mona Gherardini	Noémie Saglio	

=== Television ===
Year	Title	Role	Director	Notes
1973	L'école des femmes	Agnès	Raymond Rouleau	Television film produced by the Comédie-Française
1974	L'Avare	Mariane	René Lucot	Television film produced by the Comédie-Française
1974	Le Secret des Flamands	Maria	Robert Valey	Miniseries; 4 episodes
1975	Ondine	Ondine	Raymond Rouleau	Television film produced by the Comédie-Française
2008	Figaro	Countess Almaviva	Jacques Weber	Television film
2011	Aïcha	Doctor Assoussa	Yamina Benguigui	TV series. Episode 2: Job à tout prix
2017	Call My Agent! (Dix pour cent)	Herself	Jeanne Herry	TV series. Season 2, Episode 4: Isabelle
2018	Capitaine Marleau	Isabelle Laumont	Josée Dayan	TV series. Episode: Ne plus mourir jamais
2022	The King's Favorite (Diane de Poitiers)	Diane de Poitiers	Josée Dayan	Miniseries; 2 episodes
2023	Adieu Vinyle	Eve Faugère	Josée Dayan	Television film
2024	The Perfect Couple	Isabel Nallet	Susanne Bier	Miniseries; 5 episodes
2025	Under a Dark Sun (Soleil noir)	Béatrice Lasserre	Marie Jardillier Edouard Salier	Miniseries; 6 episodes

=== Music videos ===
==== As lead artist ====
Title	Year	Director
"Pull marine"	1984	Luc Besson
"Princesse au petit pois"	1986	Jean-Paul Seaulieu
"Où tu ne m'attendais pas"	2024	Alexandre Mattiussi

==== As featured artist ====
Title	Year	Main artist(s)	Director(s)
"Meet Me by the Gates"	2019	The Penelopes	Nicolas Bary
"Quelques mots"	2022	Malik Djoudi	Antoine Carlier

==== As guest appearance ====
Title	Year	Artist	Director
"Y'a pas un homme qui soit né pour ça"	2004	Pascal Obispo feat. Florent Pagny and Calogero	Pascal Obispo

=== Theater ===
Year	Title	Author	Director	Role	Venue
1972	The House of Bernarda Alba	Federico Garcia Lorca	Robert Hossein	Adela	Maison de la Culture de Reims
1972	Le Bourgeois gentilhomme	Molière	Jean-Louis Barrault	Lucile	Comédie-Française
1973	The Miser	Molière	Jean-Paul Roussillon	Mariane	Comédie-Française
1973	The School for Wives	Molière	Jean-Paul Roussillon	Agnès	Comédie-Française
1973	Port-Royal	Henry de Montherlant	Jean Meyer	Sister Marie-Françoise de l'Eucharistie	Comédie-Française
1974	Ondine	Jean Giraudoux	Raymond Rouleau	Ondine	Comédie-Française
1974	The House of Bernarda Alba	Federico Garcia Lorca	Robert Hossein	Adela	Théâtre de l'Odéon (Comédie-Française)
1983	Miss Julie	August Strindberg	Jean-Paul Roussillon	Julie	Théâtre Édouard VII
2000	The Lady of the Camellias	Alexandre Dumas and René de Ceccatty	Alfredo Arias	Marguerite Gautier	Théâtre Marigny
2006	Mary Stuart	Wolfgang Hildesheimer	Didier Long	Mary Stuart	Théâtre Marigny
2014	Kinship	Carey Perloff	Dominique Borg	She	Théâtre de Paris
2017	L'Amour et les Forêts	Éric Reinhardt	Laurent Bazin	Voice	Le Quai (Angers) and Tour
2019-2020	Opening Night	John Cassavetes	Cyril Teste	Myrtle Gordon	Théâtre de Namur, Le Quai (Angers), Théâtre des Bouffes du Nord, Tour, Teatro Argentina (Roma), L'Alliance New York
2022-2023	Le Vertige Marilyn	Olivier Steiner	Olivier Steiner and Emmanuel Lagarrigue	Marilyn Monroe / Herself	Maison de la Poésie, Théâtre de l'Atelier, Salle Pleyel, Tour, Teatro Goldoni (Venice), L'Alliance New York
2026	La Fin du courage	Cynthia Fleury	Jacques Vincey	The author / philosopher	Théâtre de l'Atelier

=== Discography ===
- 1983: Pull Marine (Mercury/Universal)
- 1983: Journal by Alice James (Audiobook Éditions des Femmes)
- 1986: Princesse au petit pois / Léon dit (Mercury)
- 2003: Bon voyage (original film soundtrack Bon voyage by Jean-Paul Rappeneau)
- 2004: On ne sert à rien, by and with Pascal Obispo (album Sidaction, Ensemble contre le Sida, 10 ans ensemble)
- 2005: Je ne peux plus dire je t'aime, by and with Jacques Higelin (album Higelin Entre 2 Gares) (EMI)
- 2008: Wo wo wo wo, by and with Christophe (album Aimer ce que nous sommes)
- 2018 : Albert Camus et Maria Casarès, Correspondance (1944-1959) with Lambert Wilson (Audiobook Gallimard)
- 2018: D'accord, by and with Pascal Obispo, with Youssou N'Dour (album Obispo)
- 2019: Meet me by the Gates, by and with The Penelopes
- 2021: Revolution #49 (album Hey Clockface / La Face de pendule à coucou by Elvis Costello)
- 2021: Sous le soleil exactement (album Les Pianos de Gainsbourg by André Manoukian)
- 2021: Quelques mots, by and with Malik Djoudi (album Troie)
- 2022: The Last Goodbye, with The Penelopes
- 2022: Jeder tötet was er liebt (original film soundtrack Peter von Kant by François Ozon)
- 2023: Adjani, Bande Originale (Warner Music International)

=== Bibliography ===
- 2024: Du côté de chez Marilyn, written with Olivier Steiner (L'Observatoire)

== Accolades and honours ==
Adjani was made a Knight of the Legion of Honour on 14 July 2010 for her contributions to the arts. She was appointed Commander of the Ordre des Arts et des Lettres in 2014.

Association	Year	Category	Work	Result	Ref.
Academy Awards	1976	Best Actress	The Story of Adele H.	Nominated	
Academy Awards	1990	Best Actress	Camille Claudel	Nominated	
Bambi Awards	1978	Best Actress – International	The Story of Adele H.	Won	
Berlin International Film Festival	1989	Silver Bear for Best Actress	Camille Claudel	Won	
Cabourg Film Festival	2003	Best Actress	Adolphe	Won	
Cannes Film Festival	1981	Best Actress	Possession and Quartet	Won	
Cartagena Film Festival	1975	Golden India Catalina for Best Actress	The Story of Adele H.	Won	
César Awards	1976	Best Actress	The Story of Adele H.	Nominated	
César Awards	1977	Best Actress	Barocco	Nominated	
César Awards	1982	Best Actress	Possession	Won	
César Awards	1984	Best Actress	One Deadly Summer	Won	
César Awards	1986	Best Actress	Subway	Nominated	
César Awards	1989	Best Actress	Camille Claudel	Won	
César Awards	1995	Best Actress	La Reine Margot	Won	
César Awards	2010	Best Actress	La Journée de la jupe	Won	
César Awards	2019	Best Supporting Actress	The World Is Yours	Nominated	
David di Donatello Awards	1975	Special David	The Slap	Honored	
David di Donatello Awards	1976	Best Foreign Actress	The Story of Adele H.	Won (Note: Tied with Glenda Jackson for Hedda)	
Fantasporto	1983	Best Actress	Possession	Won	
German Film Awards	1979	Best Actress	Nosferatu the Vampyre	Nominated	
German Film Awards	1982	Best Actress	Possession	Nominated	
Globe de Cristal Awards	2010	Best Actress	La Journée de la jupe	Won	
International Cinephile Society Awards	2019	Best Supporting Actress	The World Is Yours	Nominated	
Jupiter Awards	1985	Best International Actress	One Deadly Summer	Won	
Jupiter Awards	1987	Best International Actress	Subway	Nominated	
Lumière Awards	2010	Best Actress	La Journée de la jupe	Won	
Marrakech International Film Festival	2016	Honorary Golden Star	—N/a	Honored	
Molière Awards	2001	Best Actress	The Lady of the Camellias	Nominated	
Molière Awards	2007	Best Actress	Mary Stuart	Nominated	
Molière Awards	2020	Best Actress	Opening Night	Nominated	
Monte-Carlo Television Festival	2009	Golden Nymph Award for Best Actress – Television Films	La Journée de la jupe	Won	
Montreal World Film Festival	2004	Grand Prix Special des Amériques	—N/a	Honored	
Nastro d'Argento Awards	1991	European Nastro d'Argento	—N/a	Nominated	
National Board of Review Awards	1975	Best Actress	The Story of Adele H.	Won	
National Society of Film Critics Awards	1975	Best Actress	The Story of Adele H.	Won	
New York Film Critics Circle Awards	1975	Best Actress	The Story of Adele H.	Won	
Société des Auteurs et Compositeurs Dramatiques	1974	Prix Suzanne Bianchetti	The Slap	Won	

== See also ==
- Maghrebian community of Paris
- List of oldest and youngest Academy Award winners and nominees – Youngest nominees for Best Actress in a Leading Role
- List of actors with Academy Award nominations
- List of Academy Award winners and nominees from France
- Legion of Honour
- Legion of Honour Museum
- List of Legion of Honour recipients by name (A)
- Ribbons of the French military and civil awards
