= AMI Paris =

French luxury ready-to-wear fashion brand

AMI
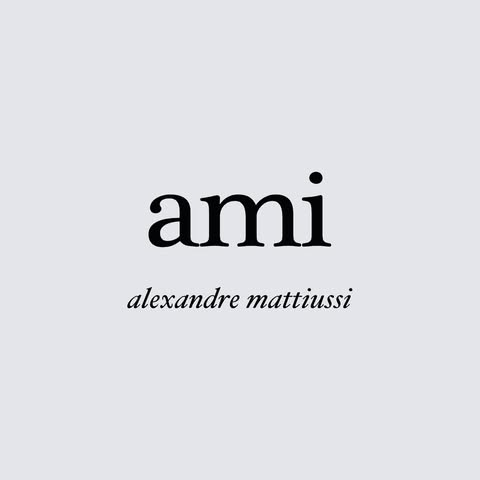
- Type: Private
- Industry: Luxury fashion
- Founded: 2011; 15 years ago in France
- Founders: Alexandre Mattiussi
- Headquarters: Paris, France
- Products: Prêt-à-porter
- Website: www.amiparis.com

AMI is a French ready-to-wear fashion house founded by Alexandre Mattiussi in 2011. The headquarters is located on 54 Rue Étienne Marcel in Paris, France. The brand is based in Paris and produces clothing and accessories. The name "Ami" means "friend" in French and refers to Mattiussi's initials.

== History ==
Alexandre Mattiussi previously worked at Christian Dior's "30 Montaigne" men's line, at Givenchy as first assistant for menswear, and at Marc Jacobs. His work at these luxury brands was aimed at wealthy clients. While he was crafting cashmere sweaters for Marc Jacobs, he realized he couldn't afford the sweaters he was designing. Mattiussi founded the company to produce clothing for a wider market. In 2013, Nicolas Santi-Weil joined the company as CEO.

Following its founding, the brand expanded into international markets. In December 2012, the brand opened its first boutique in Paris. In 2013, Alexandre Mattiussi received the ANDAM (Association Nationale pour le Développement des Arts de la Mode) Fashion Award. In 2016, he became a member of Fédération de la Haute Couture et de la Mode.

In 2017, the brand launched its AMI de Cœur line. In 2019, Ami launched womenswear. In 2021, Sequioa Capital China acquired a controlling stake in Ami.

As of 2021, Ami had expanded to more than 60 stores, more than 700 points of sale, and boutiques, spanning New York, China, and Japan. The brand also opened a store in New York's SoHo neighborhood at 77 Greene Street. According to the Financial Times, the company's revenue had grown from €35 million in 2019 to €300 million for the year ending March 2023. In February 2025, Ami opened a new flagship in Paris's Marais district at 96 rue de Turenne, described as the brand's largest store in the world. In November 2025, Ami opened its first flagship store in Brussels, Belgium.

== Success and social media ==
As of 2025, AMI has over one million followers on Instagram. Fans gravitate towards the brand's lifestyle storytelling, candid runway videos, and rooftop shows at Galeries Lafayette. AMI branches into TikTok, which engages with fans and the community in their well-known storytelling content. Furthermore, the popular Netflix show, Emily in Paris, featured pieces from AMI. The success of AMI can be attributed to its digital presence in fashion culture and development from logo recognition to sophisticated outfitting.

== Collaborations ==
- (2015) AMI collaborated with Moncler, an Italian luxury fashion brand, on a curated outerwear collection for their Fall/Winter season
- (2017) AMI collaborated with GAP on their campaign highlighting designers globally
- (2022) The PUMA collaboration featured "Chapter 1" and "Chapter 2". Blending Parisian tailoring with sportswear.
  - Chapter 1 introduced a premium, relaxed wardrobe focused on family and friends in Spring 2022.
  - Chapter 2, introduced in the winter of 2022, focused on outdoorsy, technical, and colorful pieces such as sneakers, fleece, and jackets.
- (2023) saw a collaboration with Antoine Dupont, the French rugby player
- (2026) a month-long collaboration with the iconic brasserie Balthazar in New York City, featured co-branded, limited items which included a special menu and a bakery cart
