= The Big Operator =

The Big Operator may refer to:

- The Big Operator (1976 film), a 1976 French comedy film
- The Big Operator (1959 film), a 1959 crime/drama film
