= Alfredo Arias (theatre producer) =

Theatre producer, actor and playwright

Alfredo Arias (born 4 March 1944) is a theatre producer, actor and playwright. Born in a Buenos Aires suburb, he has subsequently acquired French nationality and, since 1969 or 1970, been based in Paris.

== Life ==
=== Early years ===
Arias were born in Lanús, an industrial city contiguous with Buenos Aires. His father was a factory worker: output included espadrilles and tarpaulins. His relationship with his mother was troubled and Arias joined the Péronist youth organisation. His parents planned that he should become a lawyer, although Arias himself developed an early determination to work in the arts. Aged 11 he was enrolled in a military school after which he was required to pass a legal qualification.

He participated in the theatrical courses provided by the Alliance Française, but was quickly discouraged by its outdated and classical approach.

=== Theatrical career ===
With like-minded friends Alfredo Arias founded a theatrical group in Buenos Aires called "TSE" in 1968, and presented a series of original productions blending fantasy, magic and humour, "Dracula", "Aventuras" and "Aventuras". However, identified as both a communist and a homosexual he began to targeted by official repression from proxies for the military dictatorship which then held sway in Argentina. He decided to leave Argentina at the end of 1968, settling briefly in New York City before moving on to Paris.

His first piece in Paris, "History of the Theatre" ("Histoire du Théâtre"), and his production of a play about Eva Perón, written by his fellow exile, Copi, were both commended for their originality of tone, elements of fantasy, and above all for their radically new theatrical approach. They were followed by "Police Comedy de luxe" ("Comédie policière; Luxe"), a music hall parody, and by "Heartbreak of an English she-cat" ("Peines de cœur d'une chatte anglaise"), based on the novel of Balzac and the illustrations of Grandville, in which the characters wear masks, which ran for more than 300 performances in France and enjoyed commensurate success internationally, especially in Italy.

His "TSE group" having been successfully translated from South America, staged productions in a range of Paris theatres, presenting new creations including "The North Star" ("L'Étoile du Nord"), "The Venetian Twins" ("Les Jumeaux vénitiens") by Goldoni, "The Jungle Beast" ("La Bête dans la jungle") by Marguerite Duras based on a novel by Henry James, and "The seated woman" ("La Femme assise") by Copi.

In 1985 Arias was appointed to direct the Commune Theatre at Aubervilliers in the northern suburbs of Paris. Here he spent six years working on the classical repertoire, on contemporary productions and on ironic music hall reinterpretations, ranging across Marivaux, Maeterlinck, Mérimée, Goldoni and others. His musical production "Family of Artists" underwent a reprise in Argentina. He also collaborated again with his compatriot, Copi, for "The steps of the Sacré-Cœur" ("Les Escaliers du Sacré-Cœur").

He was invited to produce The Tempest in the Palais des Papes for the Avignon Festival, and the Comédie-Française invited him to stage Schnitzler's La Ronde at the Odéon Theatre in Paris. In 1992, he began a series of original creations that enabled him to invent a new theatrical language, blending dance and music with poetic dialogues. Examples include the award-winning review "Mortadela" (written in collaboration with René de Ceccatty, with whom he has subsequently written regularly), Folies Bergère reviews "Fous des Folies" and "Faust Argentin" and a new staging of "Heartbreak of an English she-cat" ("Peines de cœur d'une chatte anglaise") which won Molière awards for its staging and costumes.

=== Opera ===
Alfredo Arias has also brought his very personal touch to opera, in France (Opéra Bastille, Théâtre du Châtelet, the Aix-en-Provence Festival and the Caen Opera), in Italy (Milan, Turin and Spoleto) in Spain and Argentina (Teatro Colón). Operas staged by Alfredo Arias include the following:

- Les Indes galantes by Rameau
- The Rake's Progress by Stravinsky
- The Merry Widow by Lehár
- The Tales of Hoffmann by Offenbach (two different productions)
- The Breasts of Tiresias by Apollinaire
- The Barber of Seville by Rossini
- A Midsummer Night's Dream by Britten
- Carmen by Bizet (included in the repertoire of the Opéra Bastille)
