= Ishkq in Paris =

2013 film by Prem Raj

- Theatrical release poster
- Directed by: Prem Raj
- Written by: Prem Raj; Preity Zinta
- Produced by: Preity Zinta; Neelu Zinta
- Starring: Preity Zinta; Rhehan Malliek; Isabelle Adjani
- Cinematography: Manush Nandan
- Edited by: Rameshwar S. Bhagat; Mahendra Mishra
- Music by: Sajid–Wajid
- Production company: PZNZ Media
- Distributed by: T-Series
- Release date: 24 May 2013
- Running time: 96 minutes
- Country: India
- Language: Hindi

Ishkq in Paris (transl. Love in Paris) is a 2013 Indian Hindi-language romance film starring Preity Zinta, Rhehan Malliek and Isabelle Adjani, directed by Prem Raj, produced by Zinta and co-written by Raj and Zinta. Initially set for release on 21 September 2012, the film's release was postponed multiple times before finally being released on 24 May 2013.

== Plot ==
The story starts with a narration of Paris and its symbolism of love. Marie Elise is the narrator who says you can be in love but never find love or a lover here in Paris. A Parisian reads a script of a play as follows: Ishkq is the name of a girl who was born in Paris (Preity Zinta) and doesn't believe in deep love. All she wants is no commitments in the relationship and wants to be free. She is a photographer and playwright. Akash Kapoor, Cash with an A (Rhehan Malliek), and his friend Karan, who comes to see him off, are seen running on the railway station because they might miss the last train to Paris when the narrator says that Akash doesn't know that he will regret it if he doesn't leave this train. Karan invites Akash to his wedding but Akash is not sure about going. Akash enters the train and meets a girl who understands Hindi. The girl is Ishkq. They flirt around and have wine on the train to Paris. Ishkq says that she was roaming in Rome for the weekend because she loves being served by men and Italian waiters, to be specific, and guesses if Akash is Gujarati. Akash introduces and says he is from Delhi, Funjabi (Punjabi), and moved to London a year ago. He missed his flight to London, so catching this train to Paris and next morning to London.

While leaving, Akash asks for spending time with him, but Ishkq denies, but she later agrees since he is also not interested in commitment and will never meet again or ask for an address, number, or email ID. Akash gives her a rose, and Ishkq asks him to meet at 7:55 pm sharp at the Eiffel Tower entrance. Ishkq surprises Akash by showing him the Eiffel Tower filled with lights, and she narrates how she met an Italian waiter and fell in love at first sight in Rome, but he is weak and started crying. She used to go every morning to his cafe for breakfast. When they roam around, they see couple kissing but he never kisses her, she hints that after hot kisses cold gelato is good. He gets her gelato but charges her 4 euros. Akash teases her that even her love will be charged by this Italian waiter and her love for being served by men. Seems that he is an agent working at London and lives on commission like the hero of movie Jery Mcquire played by Tom Cruise. Akash falls in love with her eyes and says anyone will forget if they see her eyes filled with love but again teases her last bf – Italian waiter. It was love in air or Paris's magic, both wanted the night to be beautiful. Chunky Pandey stops them running around, says he has everything like antiques in the world and gives him a fun dice and they go to disc have drinks and dance.

At midnight, they walk on streets and Ishkq says about her school time boyfriend and say pickup lines to each other. They also share evil break up lines and go for dinner where a dance girl approached Akash and asks them to visit next day. But she seems to read their mind and tells Ishkq will get married in few months but Ishkq never believes and leaves the restaurant but the physic lady says she will find her father soon. They throw dice and movie comes up and it's too late but they plan to make their own and enact few scenes. They go to park and Akash confesses that he never fell in love or shed a tear for anyone. Ishkq reveals that he had a snake charmer type boyfriend and she cried over him, because he said that she will never be happy and will be sad and lonely. Akash cried only when his parent divorced but his parents were happy that his tears were never seen. Ishkq says she fears loneliness and she will be left alone and not able to make others happy. Akash says the world is scared about this. Their loneliness spoke volumes and made them friends. It was next morning, they had coffee and Ishkq said she didn't like goodbye so asks Akash to leave first but asks him to wait for another surprise. They both agree they had the best night ever. Akash waits till he gets late and leaves. Next moment Ishkq arrives in the café with a gift but since he left she also leaves thinking they will never meet. There was an unconnected and unknown bonding between the two which both didn't realize. But could they forget one evening in Paris?

The foreigner has read the first part of the play and leaves the dressing room but thinks the story's starting would be a part of someone's life. The foreigner is none other than Ishkq's mother, Marie Elise. Assistant says Deborah is here and her mother says she is not yet finished with the script. Both their lives are back to normal and they forget that beautiful night, time didn't stop. Akash used to smile thinking about it sometimes. Akash gets a late-night message for Karan's wedding at Paris and says to Susan that Karan is irritating since Akash doesn't wants to come for Karan's wedding as he doesn't believe in marriage, Susan explains then Akash should not expect Karan to speak for rest of life. Akash searches for Ishkq and goes in Paris. There they go together to Karan wedding and Akash realized his love for Ishkq and takes her all around and she confesses that the beautiful portrait of her mom is drawn by her dad the amazing artists according to Akash. He proposes her but she refuses him saying he is not her saviour from loneliness and insecurity. They part ways never to meet each other. Ishkq’ s mom realizes her feelings and calls Akash to her home where Akash tells that her daughter is afraid of any serious relationship because of the split between her parents and feels insecure. Soon her mother realized and tells her that her parents Ranveer and Marie decided to part happily because of their careers and all these years Ishkq misunderstood that her dad left her. Akash leaves her a card with apologies and that he will leave for London on next morning 8 am train and will taste the laksa from the station restaurants. Ishkq is seen running towards him and confessing her love to him and that if he leaves she will be alone again. He proposes to her again and hug and cry. Finally, the play which Marie Elise was directing, which was Ishkq and Akash's love story, gets over. They fly to India for their Funjabi wedding, and there Ishkq meets her father, Ranveer, recollecting her childhood days as well.

== Cast ==
- Preity Zinta as Ishkq
  - Maya Xinya as young Ishkq
- Rhehan Malliek as Akash
- Isabelle Adjani as Marie Elise
- Olivier Lafont as Karan
- Anoop Puri as Karan's father
- Manju Malugude as Karan's mother
- Dalip Tahil as Akash's father
- Kanika Dang as Akash's mother
- Uday Pal Singh as Akash's grandfather
- Nayn Bhatt as Akash's grandmother
- Ruchika Pandey as Gurpreet
- Chirjot Kohli as Montu
- Chunky Pandey (special appearance)
- Shekhar Kapur as Ranveer (special appearance)
- Salman Khan as himself (uncredited special appearance in "Kudiye Di Kurti")
- Simon Walsh as background dancer

== Production ==
The film marks a comeback for Preity Zinta.

=== Filming ===
The film was shot mainly in Europe, at very great expense. Much of the film was shot in France (mainly in Paris and Lyon), with some scenes shot in Prague. A few scenes were shot in India also.

== Soundtrack ==
Music director duo Sajid–Wajid composed the songs for Ishkq in Paris. The soundtrack release date was announced on 15 September via Zinta's Twitter account. The songs are penned by Jalees Sherwani, Prasoon Joshi, Kumaar, Kausar Munir, Sophie Choudry and Priya Panchal.

Ishkq in Paris

Soundtrack album by Sajid–Wajid
- Released: 15 September 2012
- Genre: Film soundtrack
- Length: 27:46
- Label: T-Series
- Producer: Sajid–Wajid

Sajid–Wajid chronology
Rowdy Rathore (2012)	Ishkq in Paris (2012)	Kamaal Dhamaal Malamaal (2012)

Tracklist
No.	Title	Lyrics	Singer(s)	Length
1.	"It's All About Tonight"	Prasoon Joshi	Sunidhi Chauhan, Sophie Choudry, Rahul Vaidya	03:45
2.	"Kudiye Di Kurti"	Jalees Sherwani	Sonu Nigam, Shreya Ghoshal	04:13
3.	"Jaane Bhi De"	Kumaar	Wajid	04:35
4.	"Teri Choodiyan Da Crazy Crazy Sound"	Priya Panchal	Wajid	04:07
5.	"Jaane Bhi De" (Duet)	Kumaar	Sonu Nigam, Sunidhi Chauhan	04:35
6.	"Saiyaan"	Kausar Munir	Rahat Fateh Ali Khan	05:42

== Reception ==
=== Critical response ===
Writing for Sify, Sonia Chopra gave the film an extremely positive review, praising the entirety of the cast, the cinematography and the dialogues and labelling it "great" and "irresistible, despite its flaws". Rachit Gupta of Filmfare gave the film 3/5 stars but did not have many positive things to say, calling the film a "flaky and uninteresting love story". Similarly, in The Times of India, Meena Iyer gave 2.5/5 stars, stating "the actress is good but there ends the show", while Gaurav Malani called the film not "bad", but "boring", which to him was worse. In Bollywood Hungama, Taran Adarsh gave it the same rating, praising the chemistry between the two leads as well as the visuals, but criticizing the screenplay, concluding that Ishkq in Paris was "decent fare". Writing for India Today, Vinayak Chakravorty found that despite similarities with other films, it managed to find some originality and that Isabelle Adjani's performance was impressive, but was disappointed by the direction, the lack of chemistry between the leads, Rhehan Malliek's lack of screen presence, the fact that Preity Zinta's performance is similar to many other roles she's done before and deemed the script "bad". while similarly in Mint, Nandini Ramnath concluded that "if the movie works at all", it was because of the short runtime and Preity Zinta's "contagious joy at being the cynosure of attention". In The Asian Age, Suparna Sharma commended Zinta for producing the film herself and appreciated the short runtime but also found the story to be "wispy thin", Malliek to have "no personality" and Adjani to be "wasted".

Raja Sen for Rediff.com has given 1/5 stars and says Ishkq in Paris is a bad film brought further down by a bunch of Bollywood cliches and a fading Preity Zinta, which is the same rating given by Mayank Shekhar in the Daily Bhaskar, who goes on to call the lead characters "uninteresting" and lament the state of Preity Zinta's career. Strangely enough, Shekhar incorrectly claims that Zinta plays two roles in the film, that of Ishkq and Ishkq's mother. in.com gave the film a poor review too, criticizing the weak screenplay and Preity's performance. In a special "Twitter review" for IBN, Shomini Sen deemed that though "Preity Zinta tries hard [...], except for some amazing shots of Paris [the film] has nothing much to offer.", while in another, more traditional review, Rajeev Masand called the film "misguided" and "overwrought", in addition to finding Rhehan Malliek "as expressive as a slab of granite". while India TV News felt that Preity Zinta's screen presence is the only reason to watch the film despite the "decent" cinematography and "crisp" editing, as Rhehan Malliek is "unconvincing" and the music "unmemorable". while in The Indian Express, Shubhra Gupta gave it 2/5 stars, lamenting that it was filled with "all the clichés that you can think of". Shubha Shetty-Saha for Mid-Day agreed with Gupta, ans went on to call Adjani "wasted", Malliek "flat" and felt that Preity Zinta looked desperate to recapture her lost success, deeming the film "disappointing". In the Hindustan Times, Sarit Ray thought the film felt dated though he did enjoy the cinematography and in The Hindu, Sudhish Kamath gave the film one of its worst reviews, calling the writing "weak" and the actors "awful", warning potential viewers that going to see the film might leave them "feeling suicidal". For the Mumbai Mirror, Karan Anshuman thought the movie was "without heart", the actors had no chemistry and felt sorry for the state of Preity Zinta's career, encouraging her to "be bold" and "change the act", similarly in Daily News and Analysis, Tushar Joshi felt that the actress seemed "in a constant need for approval", advising only her die-hard fans to go watch the film. The Deccan Herald, Shilpa Jamkhandikar called the film "mediocre", a "farce of a film" and Preity Zinta "a shadow of her past [self]", while Khalid Mohamed wrote in the Deccan Chronicle that the screenplay was "thinner than crepe". For First Post, Deepanjana Pal deemed the film completely illogical. For The New Indian Express, Nandini Krishnan called Preity Zinta "irritating" and the film "an insult to cinema, Paris, love and Isabelle Adjani" and in the Pakistani The Friday Times, Nandini Krishnan was "appalled" by the film, calling it "disastrous" and making fun of "the almost 40-year-old Zinta [...] trying to pass off as the still-beautiful Adjani's daughter", saying it "gave [her her] first laugh of the film". Similarly in Outlook, Namrata Joshi was saddened by Zinta's plastic surgery-altered looks, thought she lacked chemistry with her co-star and called the narration tedious.
