= Gaurav Chanana =

Indian model and actor

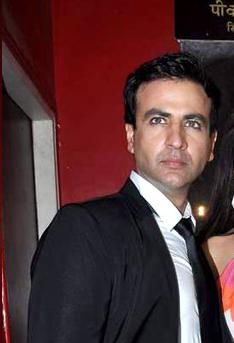
- At the premiere of Ishkq in Paris
- Born: India
- Occupations: Actor, director
- Years active: 2002–2013

Gaurav Chanana (also known as Rhehan Malliek) is an Indian model and film and television actor. The role of Akash in Ishkq in Paris provided his major breakthrough. He also worked as a Second Unit Director or Assistant Director for Ittefaq (2001).

== Career ==
Gaurav appeared in the music video for the Yesudas song, Chamak cham cham chamake hai sitaro me tu hi, with Rimi Sen. He made his film debut in Woh Tera Naam Tha in 2004. He played the protagonist role of Dr. Rahul Mehra in the tele-series Sanjivani, but was later replaced by Mihir Mishra. He also starred in soaps like Hey...Yehii To Haii Woh! on Star One where he played the male lead and Risshton Ki Dor on Sony TV as Rahul Raichand where he was later replaced by Amit Sareen.

== Filmography ==
=== Television ===
Year	TV show	Role	Channel	Notes
2001	Love Mein Kabhi Kabhi	Manav Vohra	SAB TV	
2002	Sanjivani	Dr. Rahul Mehra	Star Plus	
2004-2005	Hey...Yehii To Haii Woh!	Sameer Kamath / Raj Kamath	Star One	
2006	Risshton Ki Dor	Rahul Raichand	Sony TV	

=== Film ===
Year	Film	Role	Notes
2004	Woh Tera Naam Tha	Badruddin "Badru"	
2006	Zinda		
2010	Kajraare	Sadiq	Dead
2013	Ishkq in Paris		credited as Rhehan Maliek

=== Music video ===
- He appeared in "Chamak Cham Cham Chamke Hain" (Sitaron Mein Tu Hi - 2000) along with actress Rimi Sen.

== See also ==
List of Indian film actors
