= Claude Pinoteau =

French film director and scriptwriter

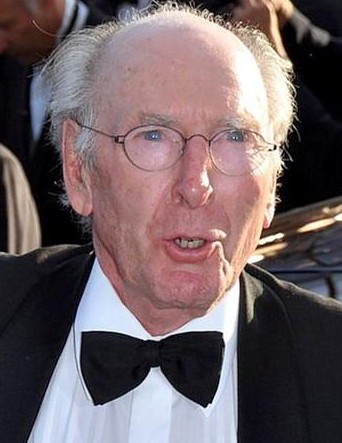
- Pinoteau at the 2011 Cannes Film Festival
- Born: 25 May 1925; Boulogne-Billancourt, France
- Died: 5 October 2012 (aged 87); Neuilly-sur-Seine, France
- Occupation: Film director

Claude Pinoteau (French pronunciation: [klod pinɔto]; 25 May 1925 – 5 October 2012) was a French film director and scriptwriter. Born in Boulogne-Billancourt, Hauts de Seine, Île-de-France, France. He died in Neuilly-sur-Seine, aged 87. His sister was the actress Arlette Merry, and his brother was the director Jacques Pinoteau.

== Filmography ==
- 1971 : It Only Happens to Others
- 1973 : Escape to Nowhere with Lino Ventura, Leo Genn et Suzanne Flon
- 1974 : The Slap with Lino Ventura, Annie Girardot et Isabelle Adjani
- 1976 : Le Grand Escogriffe with Yves Montand, Agostina Belli et Claude Brasseur
- 1979 : Jigsaw (L'Homme en colère) with Lino Ventura, Angie Dickinson et Donald Pleasence
- 1980 : La Boum with Claude Brasseur, Brigitte Fossey et Sophie Marceau
- 1982 : La Boum 2 with Claude Brasseur, Brigitte Fossey et Sophie Marceau
- 1984 : La Septième Cible with Lino Ventura, Lea Massari et Jean Poiret
- 1988 : L'Étudiante with Sophie Marceau, Vincent Lindon et Élisabeth Vitali
- 1991 : La Neige et le feu with Vincent Perez, Géraldine Pailhas et Matthieu Rozé
- 1994 : Cache cash with Michel Duchaussoy, Georges Wilson et Jean-Pierre Darroussin
- 1997 : Les Palmes de M. Schutz with Isabelle Huppert, Philippe Noiret et Charles Berling
- 2005 : Un abbé nommé Pierre, une vie pour les autres (documentary)
