= Jean-François Lepage =

French photographer and painter

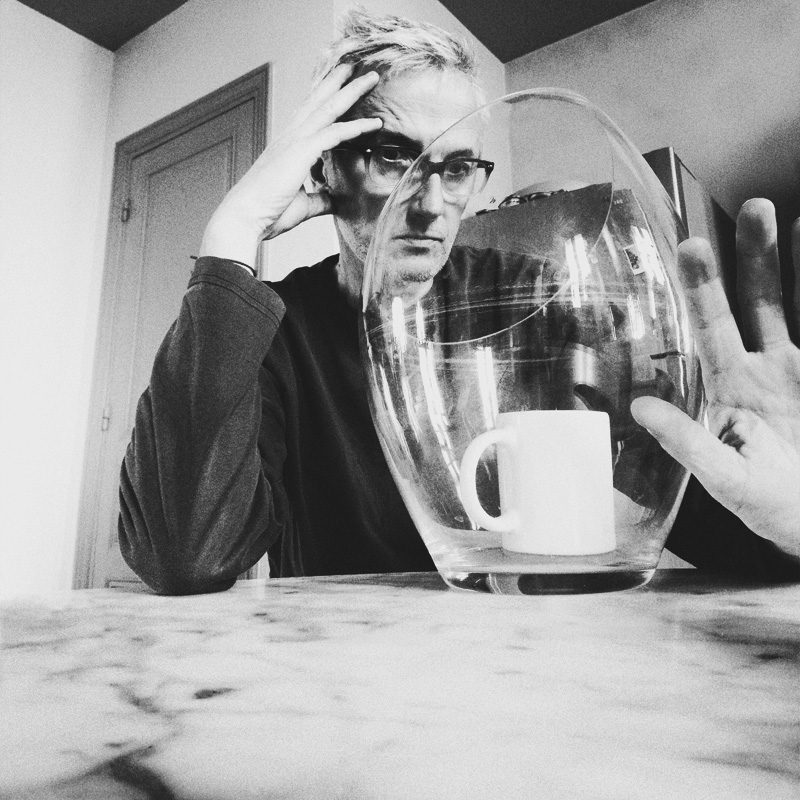
- Lepage in 2016
- Born: 22 February 1960 (age 66); Paris, France
- Known for: Photography – Painting
- Website: http://jeanfrancoislepage.com/

Jean-François Lepage (born 22 February 1960), is a French photographer and painter. He lives and works in Paris.

== Life and work ==
Lepage was born in Paris, France, in 1960. He was introduced to photography by his uncle who was art director at Cosmopolitan magazine. He then discovered the work of the street photographers Henri Cartier Bresson, William Eugene Smith and Robert Frank as well as the fashion photographers Erwin Blumenfeld, Helmut Newton and Guy Bourdin. In 1977, Lepage left school before graduating and worked at the post office. Two years later, after a one-year trip to the United States and Mexico, Lepage joined the photographer's assistant team of the Marie Claire magazine studio in Paris. He started his photographic career in 1980 and made his first exhibition of portraits of the French actress isabelle Adjani in 1983. His early photographs featured in magazines including Depeche Mode, Jill Magazine, Vogue UK and Condé Nast Publications in Italy. After the birth of his son Vincent, Lepage began to devote himself to drawing and painting in 1987. During his self-imposed exile from editorial photography, Lepage has shot the album cover of the German singer Nina Hagen in 1989 (Nina Hagen) as well as campaigns for Laura Urbinati in 1988, Jil Sander in 1990 and Masaki Matsushima in 1998.

Lepage returned with a new approach in 2001 – moving outside the studio to create new series of stories for magazines. In this work he intentionally showed the source used to light his subjects and to compose and balance his flash light with the Sun, to create a new perspective. Over the past three decades, his photographs were published in international magazines such as Another Man Magazine, Double, Exit, Italian Amica, Purple and Vogue among many others. His work at the intersection of painting, cinema and contemporary photography, represents a very different way of seeing the world of fashion. His approach is similar to that of the plastic arts and illustrates a significant change in fashion photography. In 2013, Lepage worked with curator Raphaëlle Stopin to present the exhibition 'Memories from the Future' during the 28th International Hyères Festival of Fashion and Photography.

In 2014, Jean-François Lepage had begun to pull away from fashion. MOONLIGHT ZOO, his first monograph was published in April 2015 by Prestel Publishing while at the same time his latest series entitled Recycle (prelude) – the first opus of his most recent photographic work – was exhibited in Paris, Amsterdam and London.

== Style ==
Lepage is a great admirer of the painters Albrecht Dürer, Diego Velázquez, Kandinsky, Picasso and Braque, and his photographs reflect his love for painting. Working with large format film cameras, Lepage's photography is produced on a knife's edge. His hands-on in the gelatine, like a paintbrush in oil and pigments, the photographer reconstructs the body's anatomy, cutting the negative to build a new, multiple image. From these cut, multiplied, recomposed faces and bodies, a complex identity suddenly rises to the surface. The character's individuality emerges and creates an oscillatory wave that disturbs the peaceful surface of the image, causing it to waver between seduction and repulsion, sophistication and brutality. These images, with their stripped-back composition, are inhabited by strangely motionless beings, suspended in their own time and space; while lost in their dreams and thoughts, they meander through a land where the imaginary world of the photographer, the character and viewer's imagination project and come together.

== Selected solo exhibitions ==
- 1983 Isabelle Adjani (Portraits of the actress), Canon Galler, Paris, France
- 1988 Jean-François Lepage, French Cultural Center, Varsovie, Poland
- 1988 Jean-François Lepage, Galerie Le Comptoir de la Photographie, Paris, France
- 1992 Jean-François Lepage, White Art Gallery, Tokyo, Japan
- 1993 Jean-François Lepage, International Fashion Festival of Photography, Monte-Carlo, Monaco
- 1994 Dieu, Muséum National d'Histoire Naturelle – permanent exhibition (Reverse glass painting), Paris, France
- 1994 Photographie & Peinture, Galerie Camera Obscura, Paris, France
- 1998 Photographie 1984–1998 , Galerie 213, Paris, France
- 2011 MoonLight, Bacc, Art Cultural Center, Bangkok, Thailand
- 2013 Memories from the Future, 28th International Festival of Fashion Design and Contemporary Photography of Hyères, Hyères, France
- 2014 Inside the Mirror, Galerie Madé, Paris, France
- 2015 Recycle (Prelude), Galerie Madé, Paris, France
- 2015 Recycle (Prelude), The Ravestijn Gallery, Amsterdam, The Netherlands

== Books ==
- Archeology of elegance: 1980–2000, 20 years of fashion photography by Marion de Beaupré, Ulf Poschardt, Stéphane Baurnet – 2002, ISBN 978-2-84110-170-2
- Jean-François Lepage: Catalogue Exposition, Paris, 20 October – 15 November 1998, Galerie 213 – by Marion de Beaupré, Christian Caujolle – 1998, ISBN 978-2-912794-04-8
- Modernes: 20 years of contemporary fashion, ANDAM 1989–2009 by Florence Müller and Jean-François Lepage – 2009, ISBN 978-2-35021-207-4
- The Art of Fashion Photography by Patrick Remy – 2013, ISBN 978-3-7913-4840-7
- Jean-François lepage – MOONLIGHT ZOO by Phil Bicker and Raphaëlle Stopin – 2015, ISBN 978-3-7913-8143-5
