= La Journée de la jupe =

2008 film

- Film poster
- Directed by: Jean-Paul Lilienfeld
- Written by: Jean-Paul Lilienfeld
- Produced by: Ariel Askénazi; Bénédicte Lesage
- Starring: Isabelle Adjani; Denis Podalydès; Jackie Berroyer
- Cinematography: Pascal Rabaud
- Edited by: Aurique Delannoy
- Music by: Kohann
- Distributed by: Rézo Films
- Release dates: 18 September 2008 (La Rochelle Film Festival); 25 March 2009 (France)
- Running time: 88 minutes
- Country: France
- Language: French
- Budget: $1.5 million
- Box office: $1,997,721

La Journée de la jupe (Skirt Day) is a 2008 French film directed by Jean-Paul Lilienfeld and starring Isabelle Adjani as a high school teacher, a role which earned the actress the 2010 César award for Best Actress in a Leading Role.

A key point of the plot of the movie happened in real life: a request was sent to the French Minister of Education to propose a Skirt Day.

== Plot ==
Sonia Bergerac (Adjani), who favours wearing a skirt, teaches French literature at a middle school in a poor immigrant-dominated neighborhood. She increasingly resents the daily burden of racist and sexist abuse from her violent unmotivated students, even more so since the departure of her husband. Her wearing of a skirt is considered sensitive given the school's large Muslim population, many of whom consider such clothing immodest.

During the rehearsal of a theatre play with one of her classes, she finds a gun in a student's bag. She struggles to grab the gun, and a shot is fired accidentally that injures the student's leg. Totally overwhelmed, she loses control and takes her class hostage, opportunistically creating a proper—although biased—teaching environment.

While school, police and political authorities try to figure out what is going on and how to react, Sonia forces the students to see things her way and ultimately shows them the contradictions in their own lives. Most of them revolt against the macho bullies who abuse her and go over to her side.

When the police ask what conditions she sets for releasing the class, she asks that the government declare a Skirt Day in schools each year, when females can appear in skirts. She also asks for journalists who will publicise her case in the media. The police then get her father to speak to her and, when he switches to Arabic from French, the students realise that, like many of them, Sonia is also of North African origin.

When the journalists arrive, they are, in fact, policemen who fatally shoot her. At her funeral, the girl students all wear skirts.

== Cast ==
Main Characters

- Isabelle Adjani as Sonia Bergerac, French literature teacher
- Denis Podalydès as Chief Labouret, RAID negotiator
- Yann Collette as Officer Bechet, Labouret's ranking officer, who wants to put a show of force
- Jackie Berroyer as school principal

Students in the class

- Yann Ebonge as Mouss
- Kévin Azaïs as Sébastien
- Karim Zakraoui as Farid
- Khalid Berkouz as Mehmet
- Sonia Amori as Nawel
- Sarah Douali as Farida
- Salim Boughidene as Jérôme
- Mélèze Bouzid as Khadija
- Hassan Mezhoud as Akim
- Fily Doumbia as Adiy

Secondary characters

- Nathalie Besançon as the Minister of the Interior
- Marc Citti as Frédéric Bergerac, Sonia's husband
- Olivier Brocheriou as Julien
- Anne Girouard as Cécile
- Stéphan Guérin-Tillié as François

== Reception ==
The film was screened at the première of Berlin International film festival 2009, and was first broadcast on European culture TV channel Arte on 20 March 2009 before being released in cinemas on 25 March 2009. Lilienfeld said that the lack of funding prevented a typical theatre release and prompted a prior broadcast on TV. The inaugural release covered 50 cinemas, but this number grew because of growing public interest.

The movie was controversial because of its theme, viewpoint and the hurdles that led to an atypical cinema and TV release. It is debated whether the movie is "politically incorrect", especially in light of the success of similarly themed movie Entre les murs a few months earlier. It was nominated for Best Film at the 35th César Awards and Isabelle Adjani won a record fifth award for Best Actress. It was her first role in six years and considered to be a comeback for her.

German arts and culture TV channel ZDF Kultur produced a German language theatre play for television broadcast version entitled Verrücktes Blut.
