= Grégori Derangère =

French actor (born 1971)

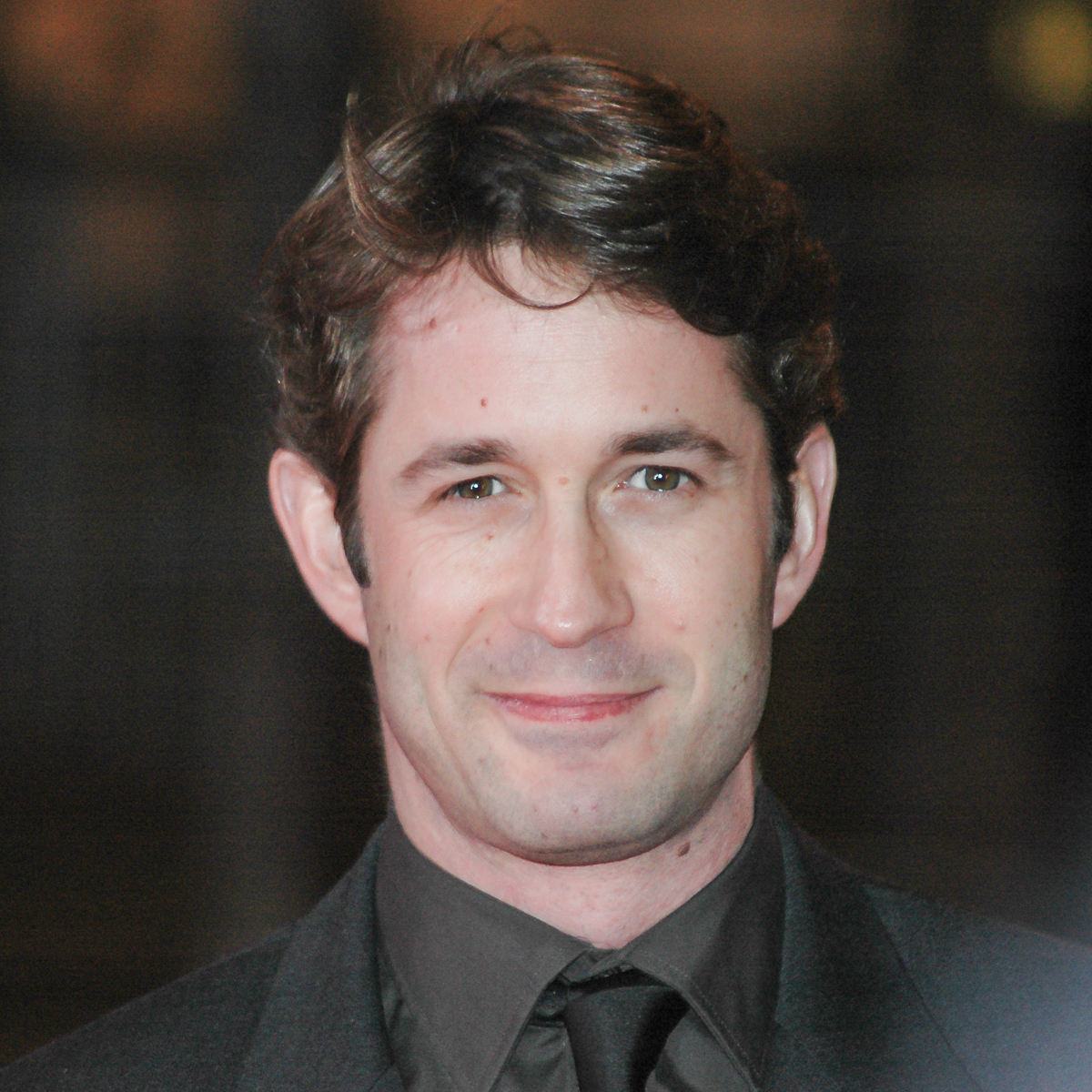
- Born: 27 March 1971 (age 55); Montpellier, France
- Occupation: Actor
- Years active: 1996-present

Grégori Derangère (born 27 March 1971) is a French actor.

== Career ==
Derangère was born in Montpellier where his parents finished their medicine studies. He moved to Moscow and French Guiana during his childhood and then to Paris.

He studied acting at the Cours Florent when he was 21 years old in Paris and at École nationale supérieure des arts et techniques du théâtre in Lyon. At 25, he acted in his first film, Éric Rochant's Anna Oz, with Charlotte Gainsbourg and Gérard Lanvin.

In 1999, he played his first major role in 30 ans by Laurent Perrin with Arielle Dombasle, Julie Depardieu, Laurent Lucas and Anne Brochet.

In 2002, he was nominated for a César Award for Most Promising Actor for playing a soldier in François Dupeyron's The Officers' Ward with Sabine Azéma, Éric Caravaca and André Dussollier.

In 2004, he won the César Award for Most Promising Actor for his performance as Frédéric Auger in Jean-Paul Rappeneau's Bon Voyage.

Gregori is one of the ambassadors of Nicolas Hulot's foundation.

== Filmography ==
=== Film ===
Year	Title	Role	Notes
1996	Anna Oz	Thomas	
1997	Marie Baie des Anges	The Pilot of F1	
1998	Pas de scandale		
1999	30 ans	Antoine	
2000	The Officers' Ward	Pierre	
2002	Bon Voyage	Frédéric Auger	César Award for Most Promising Actor; Lumière Award for Most Promising Actor
2002	Mille millièmes, fantaisie immobilière	Vincent	
2004	Les parisiens		
2004	The Light	Antoine	
2005	Le courage d'aimer		
2005	Les Fragments d'Antonin	Antonin Verset	
2006	Le passager de l’été	Joseph	
2009	Une semaine sur deux	Jérôme	
2010	Insoupçonnable	Clément Schaeffer	
2010	The Assault	Denis Favier	

=== Television ===
Year	Title	Role	Notes
1996	Un chantage en or	Xavier	
1997	Paloma	Raphaël	
1998	Chez ma tante	Clément	
1999	L'occasionnelle	Laurent	
1999	Crimes en série	Tibor Trévisse	
2000	Le bois du Pardoux	Bernard	
2000	Sauvetage	Simon	
2002	L'Année des grandes filles	René	
2005	Le Grand Charles	Claude Guy	
2005	D'Artagnan et les trois mousquetaires	Aramis	
2006	Le Rainbow Warrior	Thomas Juge	
2006	Petits meurtres en famille	Victor	
2007	L'Affaire Ben Barka	Philippe Bernier	
2007	The Murder of Princess Diana	Thomas Sylvestre	
2008	Drôle de Noël	Pierre	
2009	Au siècle de Maupassant	Comte Charles de Savigny	
2009	Reporters	Alexandre Marchand	
2010	Une Lubie de Monsieur Fortune	Vincent Fortune	
2012	Nicolas Le Floch	La Griffe	
2013	Le Déclin de l'empire masculin	Simon	
2013	Candice Renoir	Ferola	
2013	La Rupture	Jacques Chirac	
2014	Meurtres à Rocamadour	Alexandre Delcroix	
2016	The law of Alexandre	Benoît Vauthier	
2017	Caïn	Pierre Benedetti	
2017	Rien ne vaut la douceur du foyer	Alex	
2017	Roches Noires	Simon Beauregard	
2022	Un alibi	Pierre	
