= Main Aurr Mrs Khanna =

2009 film directed by Prem Soni

- Theatrical release poster
- Directed by: Prem Soni
- Written by: Prem Soni
- Produced by: Sohail Khan; Ronnie Screwvala
- Starring: Salman Khan; Kareena Kapoor; Sohail Khan
- Cinematography: Sudeep Chatterjee
- Edited by: Chirag Jain
- Music by: Songs: Sajid–Wajid; Background Score: Dharam-Sandeep
- Production companies: UTV Motion Pictures; Sohail Khan Productions
- Distributed by: UTV Motion Pictures
- Release date: 16 October 2009
- Running time: 110 minutes
- Country: India
- Language: Hindi
- Budget: ₹38 crore
- Box office: ₹14.60 crore

Main Aurr Mrs Khanna (transl. Me and Mrs. Khanna) is a 2009 Indian Hindi-language romantic comedy film written and directed by debutant Prem R. Soni and produced by Sohail Khan and Ronnie Screwvala under Sohail Khan Productions and UTV Motion Pictures. The film stars Salman Khan, Kareena Kapoor, and Sohail Khan with Nauheed Cyrusi, Yash Tonk and Bappi Lahiri in supporting roles while Preity Zinta and Deepika Padukone make cameo appearances. The film revolves around the theme of extramarital affairs. It was released on 16 October 2009 during the Diwali festival.

Indiagames released a mobile video game based on the film.

== Plot ==
A young Indian couple, Raina and Samir, meet and fall in love at first sight and decide to get married despite the objections from Samir's parents as Raina is an orphan. However, they begin their lives together and move to Melbourne, where Samir works as a stockbroker. Raina decides to work in a restaurant to pass her time.

Their relationship develops problems when Samir's business takes a severe hit. In order to get his career back online, he decides to move to Singapore and start his work from scratch. He surprises her at the airport, saying that they are not flying together. She is to go to Delhi and wait for him while he goes to gain success in Singapore, and the relationship will be a failure without financial support.

Just after Samir catches the plane and leaves for Singapore, Raina has a chance meeting with Aakash at the airport itself. They strike a rapport immediately, and once he knows of Raina's problems, Aakash lends a helping hand using his friend's help. He gets her a much better job at the airport. Now, Raina suddenly finds herself in the midst of a new and trendy airport job and, in addition, a good mansion to live in. Aakash falls deeply in love with Raina because they work together in close proximity, and Raina also seems to be attracted to him, or at least to depend on him for every small and big matter on a day-to-day basis. At this juncture, Raina is faced with the problem that her residency visa is going to expire and she will have to leave Australia. As usual, she takes her problem to Aakash. He and his friends suggest to her the idea of faking a marriage with Aakash so that she can stay on. Initially, Raina is reluctant, but soon she agrees after she realises that Aakash is a genuinely good-hearted man.

At this juncture, Samir reappears after having achieved success in Singapore. He finds that Raina is not all that thrilled at his surprise visit. He then stumbles upon the court papers concerning the wedding ceremony between Raina and Aakash and is shocked and appalled. However, Samir and Raina decide to give their relationship another chance. Aakash too agrees that Raina must try to resolve her differences with her husband. Later, Aakash finds love in a certain Mrs. Khan, who coincidentally has the same name as Raina and once had a failed relationship with a person, whose name again coincidentally is Samir.

== Cast ==
- Salman Khan as Samir Khanna
- Kareena Kapoor as Raina Khanna
- Sohail Khan as Aakash Khanna
- Nauheed Cyrusi as Nina
- Yash Tonk as Harsh
- Mahek Chahal as Tia Roberts
- Bappi Lahiri as Victor Sir
- Dino Morea as Sanjay (special appearance)
- Preity Zinta as Haseena Jagmagia (special appearance in the song "Happening”)
- Deepika Padukone as Raina Khan (special appearance)

== Production ==
Pre-production work began in mid-2007 when actors Salman Khan and Priyanka Chopra were signed on to essay the lead roles in the film. However, Chopra later opted out of the film due to date problems and the director was in talks with actresses Preity Zinta and Ayesha Takia.

In August 2007, producer Sohail Khan announced that the film's title was changed to Mr and Mrs Khanna, and was expected to go on floors in November 2007 with Lara Dutta being signed on for the female lead. However, Dutta was dropped from the film for unknown reasons and rumours had indicated that Khan was in talks with Kareena Kapoor and Deepika Padukone. The producer later confirmed the news to the media indicating that he had signed Kapoor for the film.

Sources had indicated that Shahrukh Khan, Priyanka Chopra and Deepika Padukone will be making guest appearances in the film whereas Preity Zinta will be appearing in an item number but nothing was confirmed as of March 2008. However, in June 2008, the latter confirmed the news to the media explaining, "...it's not an item song, really. It's an interesting cameo and I’ve agreed to be in the film because the director Prem Soni is a dear friend."

On 19 March 2008, the cast began filming for the project at Film City in the outskirts of Mumbai and later continued shooting in Melbourne, Australia, where a pivotal scene was shot at the Sydney Airport. Upon shooting in Melbourne Australia, the cast later returned to film in Mumbai on 15 June 2008. In March 2009, director Prem Soni announced that the film had been completed.

== Soundtrack ==
Main Aurr Mrs Khanna

Soundtrack album by Sajid–Wajid
- Released: 5 September 2009
- Recorded: 2008–2009
- Genre: Film soundtrack
- Label: T-Series
- Producers: Sohail Khan; Ronnie Screwvala

Sajid–Wajid chronology
Wanted (2009)	Main Aurr Mrs Khanna (2009)	Veer (2010)

The music had been composed by Sajid–Wajid.

Track listing
No.	Title	Artist(s)	Length
1.	"Don't Say Alvida"	Sonu Nigam, Shreya Ghoshal, Suzanne D'Mello	5:02
2.	"Don't Say Alvida" (Remix by Dj A-Myth)	Sonu Nigam, Shreya Ghoshal, Suzanne D'Mello	4:28
3.	"Don't Say Alvida" (Sad)	Shreya Ghoshal	1:31
4.	"Happening I Am Happening"	Sunidhi Chauhan, Wajid, Raja Mushtaq	5:25
5.	"Happening I Am Happening" (Remix by Dj A-Myth)	Sunidhi Chauhan, Wajid, Raja Mushtaq	3:48
6.	"Mrs. Khanna"	Shaan, Sunidhi Chauhan, Bappi Lahiri, Suzanne D'Mello, Neuman Pinto	4:12
7.	"Rabba"	Rahat Fateh Ali Khan	5:13
8.	"Tumne Socha"	Wajid, Shreya Ghoshal	5:50

== Release ==
The film was released theatrically in India on 16 October 2009. It was released on Video on demand on satellite television three days after theatrical release. CEO of UTV Motion Pictures Siddharth Roy Kapur told India Today, "Producers have got to be able to monetize whatever revenue streams they can. DTH is an emerging revenue stream and not even close to a theatre release. It's another revenue stream to monetize."

== Reception ==
=== Critical response ===
Patcy N of Rediff.com gave the film one and a half out of five, calling it a "failed attempt" which "lacks punch." Shubhra Gupta of The Indian Express gave the film two out of five, writing, "The strained relationship between the spouses which could have been explored to the benefit of the film is buried under silly comedy, improbable script turns, and a really bad mujra pictured on Preity Zinta."

=== Box office ===
It collected ₹66 million in its first week of domestic theatrical run.
