= Bon Voyage (2003 film) =

French comedy-film from 2003 directed by Jean-Paul Rappenau

- Directed by: Jean-Paul Rappeneau
- Written by: Jean-Paul Rappeneau; Patrick Modiano
- Produced by: Laurent Pétin; Michel Pétin
- Starring: Isabelle Adjani; Gérard Depardieu; Virginie Ledoyen; Yvan Attal; Grégori Derangère; Peter Coyote
- Cinematography: Thierry Arbogast
- Edited by: Maryline Monthieux
- Music by: Gabriel Yared
- Distributed by: ARP Sélection
- Release date: 16 April 2003 (France)
- Running time: 114 minutes
- Country: France
- Language: French
- Budget: €24.1 million
- Box office: $15 million

Bon Voyage (English: "Have A Good Trip") is a 2003 French film directed by Jean-Paul Rappeneau, starring Isabelle Adjani, Gérard Depardieu, Virginie Ledoyen and Grégori Derangère. It is loosely inspired by Professor Lew Kowarski's smuggling of the world's only supplies of heavy water out of France following its occupation by the Nazis.

It was a selected as the French entry for the Best Foreign Language Film category at the 76th Academy Awards, but was not nominated.

== Plot ==
In 1939, film star Viviane Denvert sits in the audience of a premiere of her new movie and notices a man who keeps staring at her. She is disturbed, and when the film is over and the audience has finished praising her, she rushes home, discovering she is pursued by the same man. He chases her into her apartment.

An hour later, Frédéric Auger, a young writer, receives a call from Viviane, who was his childhood crush. Viviane, who has long used Frédéric's devotion, asks him to come to her apartment immediately.

Upon arriving, he discovers a corpse, "accidentally" killed, which Viviane asks him to dispose of, claiming that the man had been harassing her and when she slapped him, he fell over the edge of the balcony. He agrees to help her and the two pack the corpse into the trunk of his car; however, as it is raining, he accidentally drives into a curb and hits a police signalling device. The trunk opens upon impact, revealing the dead body to the arriving police, and Frédéric is arrested and sent to prison. On the eve of the German occupation of Paris, all of the city's citizens evacuate, including the prisoners. Prisoners are paired up with another and handcuffed together. Frédéric and his cellmate Raoul take advantage of the confusion to escape. Frédéric takes the train to Bordeaux, where he learns that Viviane is. Raoul is also on the train and he leads Frédéric to a seat near another girl, Camille. Camille, a physicist, works at the elite College de France under Professor Kopolski; the two of them are guarding French stocks of heavy water that they want to ship to England before the Germans can get their hands on it.

The remainder of the film traces the action-packed adventures of the characters, caught between two forces - the German invasion and Viviane's capacity for melodrama. Some decide to stay in France while others go underground or escape to London. In a very short scene, a quite recognizable General Charles de Gaulle is told "Bon voyage" by one of the protagonists .

Frédéric eventually falls for Camille. At the end of the film, he returns from England and meets with Camille at an outdoor café. When the Germans see them, they flee and sneak into a movie theatre. When Frédéric sees one of the Germans enter the theater in search for them, he turns and kisses Camille. They stop once their pursuers leave. Frédéric looks up at the screen and sees Viviane singing and dancing. Frédéric turns to Camille, and they resume kissing as the film ends.

== Cast ==
- Isabelle Adjani: Viviane Denvert
- Gérard Depardieu: Jean-Étienne Beaufort
- Virginie Ledoyen: Camille
- Yvan Attal: Raoul
- Grégori Derangère: Frédéric Auger
- Peter Coyote: Alex Winckler
- Aurore Clément: Jacqueline de Lusse
- Édith Scob: Madame Arbesault
- Michel Vuillermoz: Monsieur Girard
- Nicolas Vaude: Thierry Arpel
- Jean-Marc Stehlé: Professor Kopolski

== Reception ==
=== Critical response ===
Bon Voyage has an approval rating of 77% on review aggregator website Rotten Tomatoes, based on 98 reviews, and an average rating of 6.7/10. The website's critical consensus states: "It's froth, but stylish and giddily entertaining". Metacritic assigned the film a weighted average score of 68 out of 100, based on 30 critics, indicating "generally favourable reviews".

=== Awards ===
- Nominations for Best Film, Best Director, Best Supporting Actor, Best Original Screenplay or Adaptation, Best Costume Design, Best Editing, Best Original Music, Best Sound at the 2004 César Awards
- Awards for Best Cinematography, Best Production Design, and Most Promising Actor (Grégori Derangère) at the 2004 César Awards

== See also ==
- List of submissions to the 76th Academy Awards for Best Foreign Language Film
- List of French submissions for the Academy Award for Best Foreign Language Film
