= The Slap (film) =

- Directed by: Claude Pinoteau
- Written by: Jean-Loup Dabadie; Claude Pinoteau
- Produced by: Alain Poiré
- Starring: Lino Ventura; Annie Girardot
- Cinematography: Jean Collomb
- Edited by: Marie-Josèphe Yoyotte
- Music by: Georges Delerue
- Distributed by: Gaumont Distribution
- Release date: 23 October 1974
- Running time: 104 min
- Countries: France; Italy
- Language: French

The Slap (French: La Gifle) is a 1974 French / Italian comedy film directed by Claude Pinoteau.

== Cast ==
- Lino Ventura - Jean Douléan
- Annie Girardot - Hélène Douléan
- Isabelle Adjani - Isabelle Douléan - la fille de Jean et d'Hélène
- Nicole Courcel - Madeleine
- Francis Perrin - Marc Morillon
- Jacques Spiesser - Remi
- Michel Aumont - Charvin
- Robert Hardy - Robert
- Nathalie Baye - Christine
- Xavier Gélin - Xavier
- Georges Wilson - Pierre
- Annick Alane - La femme de ménage de Jean
- Paul Bisciglia - Le serveur
- Robert Dalban - Le concierge du lycée

== Reception ==
On Rotten Tomatoes, the film has an aggregate score of 100% based on 5 positive reviews.
