= Luigi Gervasi =

Italian set decorator

- Occupation: Set decorator
- Years active: 1947-1968

Luigi Gervasi was an Italian set decorator. He was nominated for an Academy Award in the category Best Art Direction for the film The Taming of the Shrew.

== Selected filmography ==
- The Taming of the Shrew (1967)
