= Adolphe (film) =

- Film poster
- Directed by: Benoît Jacquot
- Written by: Benoît Jacquot; Fabrice Roger-Lacan
- Produced by: Laurent Pétin; Michèle Pétin
- Starring: Isabelle Adjani; Stanislas Merhar
- Cinematography: Benoît Delhomme
- Edited by: Luc Barnier
- Music by: Éric Serra
- Distributed by: ARP Sélection
- Release dates: 8 September 2002 (TIFF); 30 October 2002 (France)
- Running time: 102 minutes
- Country: France
- Language: French

Adolphe is a 2002 French drama film based on the novel Adolphe by Benjamin Constant. The film was directed by Benoît Jacquot and starred Isabelle Adjani as Ellénore and Stanislas Merhar as Adolphe.

== Cast ==
- Isabelle Adjani - Ellénore
- Stanislas Merhar - Adolphe
- Jean Yanne - Count
- Romain Duris - D'Erfeuil
- Jean-Louis Richard - Mr. d'Arbigny
- Anne Suarez - Mrs. d'Arbigny
- Jacqueline Jehanneuf - Aunt Choupie
- Jean-Marc Stehlé : Adolphe's father
- Maryline Even : La femme de chambre
- Bernard Ballet : The prefect
- Isild Le Besco : La lingère
- Pierre Charras : Le valet de chambre
- Rémy Roubakha : Le concierge
- François Chattot : The ambassador
- John Arnold : Le secrétaire d'ambassade
- Maurice Bernart : Le monsieur
- Isabelle Caubère : La femme du concierge
- Christophe Lavalle : Le laquais d'ambassade
