= René de Ceccatty =

French writer, translator and editor

René de Ceccatty (born 1 January 1952 in Tunis) is a French writer, translator and editor. He has written about 30 novels and biographies and translated works from Italian and Japanese. His 1994 work, Violette Leduc, éloge de la bâtarde provided a basis for Martin Provost's 2013 film Violette, for which de Ceccatty co-wrote the screen-play.

== Biography ==
De Ceccatty's work focuses on novels and drama pieces. He also translates from Italian and (collaborating with Ryôji Nakamura), Japanese. He has a deep knowledge of the works of Pier Paolo Pasolini, Violette Leduc, Alberto Moravia and of modern Italian and Japanese literature more generally. His book L'accompagnement found a particular resonance:

It is in effect a novelist's work of poetic introspection, in the tradition of earlier writers such as Hector Bianciotti, Jean Rhys, and Japanese novelist Natsume Sōseki.

His novels "Aimer" ("To love" 1998), "Consolation provisoire" ("Provisional Consolation" 1996), "L'éloignement ("Retention" 2000), "Fiction douce" ("Sweet fiction" 2002) and "Un fin" ("An Ending" 2004) together form a "quintet" devoted to the difficulties of loving, and can be seen as part of the modern Autofiction movement. Continuing in the same vein were his books "L'hôte invisible" ("The invisible host" 2007) and "Raphaël et Raphaël" (2012). He has also published biographies, essays and short stories, which are at the same time both intimate and scholarly. He wrote about Greta Garbo ("Un renoncement" 2013) and about French painter Xavier Sigalon ("Objet d'amour" 2015).

René de Ceccatty has also worked for the theatre, notably with the Argentine producer Alfredo Arias and with comedy actresses including Claudia Cardinale, Isabelle Adjani, Anouk Aimée, Marilú Marini, Aurore Clément and Adriana Asti. He has worked as a literary editor-compiler: he had published the works of the Algerian writer Rabah Belamri. Working with the Paris publishing house Hatier, he has created the so-called "Haute Enfance" ("High Childhood") series, later taken on by Éditions Gallimard. With Éditions du Seuil he founded the "Solo" and "Réflexion" ("Reflection") collections.
