= Billet (disambiguation) =

A billet is the place where a person is assigned to sleep.

Billet may also refer to:

- Billet (semi-finished product), a semi-finished cast or rolled metal product
- Billet (tack), the straps on an English saddle to which the girth is buckled
- Bar stock or billet, in metalworking, a semi-finished product which is usually milled or lathed into a more finished product
- Billet (wood), a piece of timber prepared to be split
- Billet (heraldry), a rectangular charge (shape) on a coat of arms

== People with the surname ==
- Julia Billet (born 1962), French author and poet

== See also ==
- Billet-doux
- Billets (film)
- Ballet (disambiguation)
- Bellet
- Bullet
