= The Big Operator (1976 film) =

1976 film

- Film poster
- Directed by: Claude Pinoteau
- Written by: Rennie Airth; Michel Audiard; Jean Herman; Claude Pinoteau
- Starring: Yves Montand
- Cinematography: Jean Collomb
- Edited by: Fedora Zincone
- Music by: Georges Delerue
- Distributed by: Gaumont Distribution
- Release date: 1 December 1976
- Running time: 100 minutes
- Country: France
- Language: French

The Big Operator (French: Le Grand escogriffe) is a 1976 French comedy film directed by Claude Pinoteau and starring Yves Montand.

== Plot ==
The aging villain Émile Morland talks his old friend Aristide into helping him to kidnap the son of a millionaire. Moreover, Morland engages the young actress Amandine and borrows a child baptised Alberto from his acquaintance Tony. Morland's plan is to exchange the children and then to reveal this in order to retrieve ransom from millionaire Rifai. But to everybody's surprise Rifai prefers Alberto to his moody and wearisome own son. He refuses to pay ransom because he is now happy as it is.

== Cast ==
- Yves Montand - Morland
- Agostina Belli - Amandine
- Claude Brasseur - Ari
- Aldo Maccione - Tony
- Adolfo Celi - Rifai
- Valentina Cortese - the widow
- Guy Marchand - Marcel
- Ely Galleani - Dorotea
- Gianni Cavina - Silvio
