= Association Nationale pour le Développement des Arts de la Mode =

Fashion organization based in Paris, France

- Abbreviation: ANDAM
- Formation: 1989
- Type: Nonprofit association
- Headquarters: France, Paris
- Region served: France & Worldwide
- Members: Yves Saint Laurent; Fondation Pierre Bergé - Yves Saint Laurent; Galeries Lafayette; Longchamp; LVMH - Moët Hennessy Louis Vuitton; Only The Brave; HBC; Swarovski; Thecorner.com, powered by Yoox; Fashion GPS
- Official language: French
- President: Pierre Bergé
- Co-president: Nathalie Dufour
- Affiliations: French Ministry of Culture and Communication
- Website: www.andam.fr

The Association Nationale pour le Développement des Arts de la Mode (English: National Association for the Development of the Fashion Arts) commonly known as ANDAM, is a nonprofit organisation established under the French 1901 law on associations. Each year, it organizes a major competition aimed at identifying and launching young designers onto the French and international fashion scene.

== History ==
Nathalie Dufour founded ANDAM in 1989 under the patronage of Pierre Bergé and immediately received support from the Visual Arts Delegation of the Ministry of Culture and Communication, as well as from DEFI, the Committee for the Development and Promotion of the Clothing Industry. Its creation represented a decisive step in the history of international fashion and contributed to the emergence of some of the most prominent names in contemporary fashion. In 2018, Guillaume Houzé, a patron of ANDAM and member of the executive board of the Galeries Lafayette Group, succeeded Pierre Bergé as president of ANDAM.

=== Board of Directors (2025) ===
==== Membres Fondateurs ====
- Pierre Bergé – Yves Saint Laurent Foundation
- Institut Français de la Mode
- Fédération de la Haute Couture et de la Mode

==== Membres de Droit ====
- Ministry of Culture (DGCA)
- DEFI – Committee for the Development and Promotion of the Clothing Industry
- Ministry of Industry (DGE)
- Musée des Arts Décoratifs

==== Honorary Members ====
- Chanel
- Kering
- Hermès Paris
- Longchamp
- Galeries Lafayettes
- L'Oréal Paris

=== 20th Anniversary ===
In 2009, to celebrate its 20th anniversary, ANDAM co-published an original volume titled Modernes, a publication retracing the major stylistic developments of the previous twenty years through the work of ANDAM prize winners. Florence Müller, fashion historian and author, provides an analysis of the different facets of fashion as both modern and universal. ANDAM entrusted the design of the book to graphic artist Pierre-François Letué and gave fashion photographer Jean-François Lepage carte blanche to produce a photographic series featuring the creations of the 80 award winners.

=== 30th Anniversary ===
In 2019, on the occasion of ANDAM’s 30th anniversary, the Galerie des Galeries Lafayette celebrated the milestone with an exhibition curated by the duo M/M (Paris), revisiting three decades of stylistic and political archives through a chronological fresco and runway show videos contextualized with archival material from the INA.

=== 35th Anniversary ===
In 2024, the Musée des Arts Décoratifs organized a retrospective exhibition titled Fashion, New Generations: 35 Years of ANDAM, highlighting a selection of 17 silhouettes by former prize winners and illustrating the association’s longstanding commitment to emerging designers.

== ANDAM Fashion Awards ==
Over the years, the ANDAM awards have become a reference point for fashion professionals and the international press. In addition to providing prize winners with the resources needed for long-term development and global visibility, the award opens the doors to the official Paris fashion week calendar and aims to stimulate the fashion sector in France.

While the ANDAM competition was originally reserved for European designers residing in France, its opening to international applicants in 2005 allowed it to position itself alongside major international fashion prizes such as those awarded by the CFDA, Fashion Fringe, and NewGen.

== Quotes ==
- Receiving the ANDAM Prize was like a miracle for our small company at the time. The award allowed me to produce a collection that brought the Véronique Leroy brand to international attention, notably through a remarkable photo series by Inez van Lamsweerde and Vinoodh Matadin in the magazine The Face.
  — Véronique Leroy
- It was a long time ago, but I remember feeling honored when I received the ANDAM Prize (…) I was personally inspired by it.
  — Jean Touitou, founder of A.P.C.
- The ANDAM Prize is very important in encouraging young talents to realize their dreams. Winning it gave me the opportunity to develop my vision of fashion: I was able to create my show exactly as I wanted and bring the image I had in mind to the runway.
  — Jeremy Scott
- Thanks to ANDAM, I felt greatly encouraged in my journey and benefited from a significant financial boost. The competition provided invaluable support in terms of communication, sales, and institutional visibility.
  — Anne Valérie Hash
- Being recognized by such a prestigious jury, including Sarah from Colette and Joseph Quartana from Seven New York, is an enormous help, and showing in Paris will allow my brand to reach the next level.
  — Gareth Pugh
- For a young designer with clear talent, coming to show in Paris and confronting professionals from around the world is the most important and exciting adventure. ANDAM makes this possible and allows Paris to remain the essential gateway to success.
  — Jean-Jacques Picart

== See also ==
- Comité Colbert
- List of fashion designers
