= Bernard Ballet =

French actor (1941–2022)

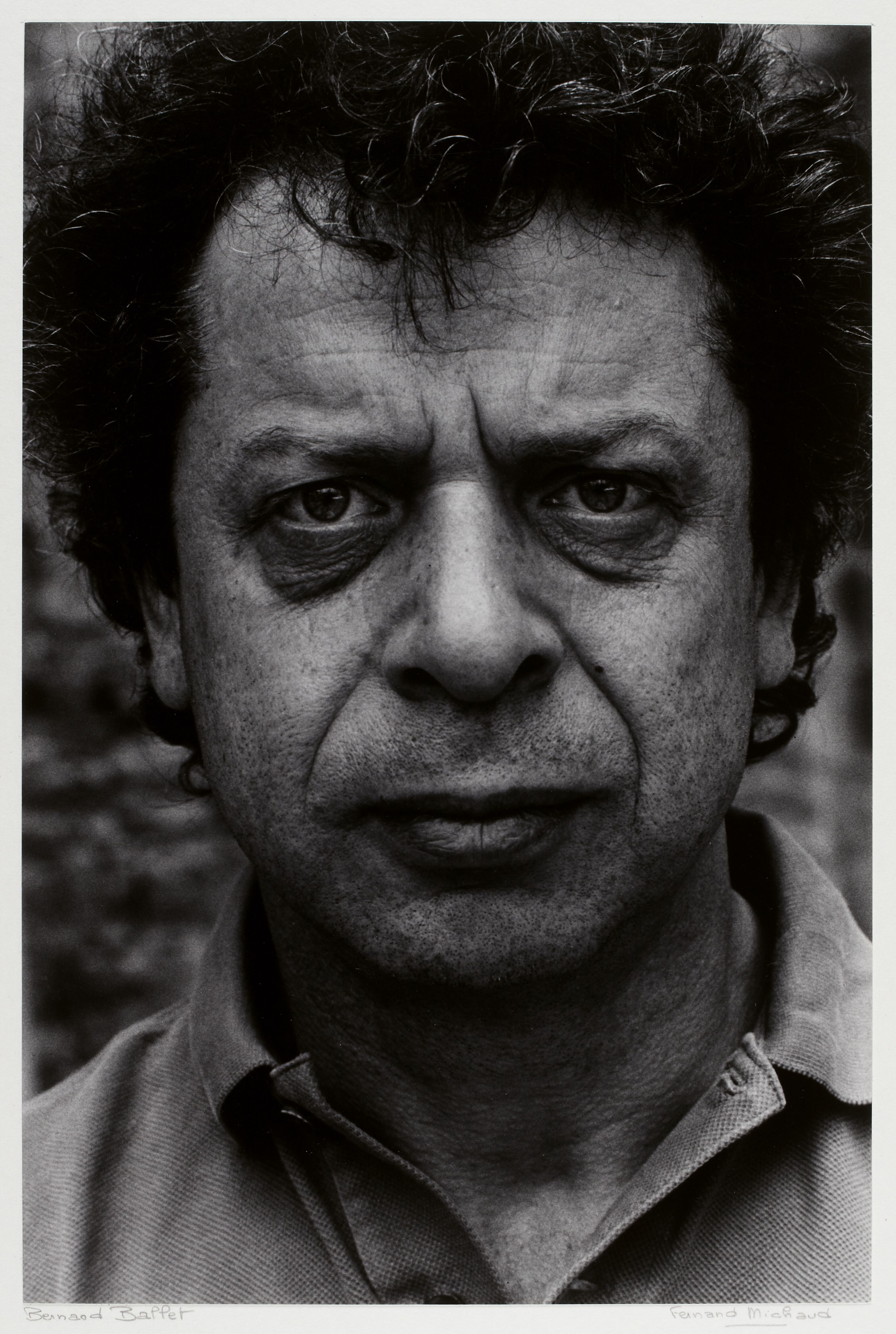
- Born: January 1941; Lyon, France
- Died: 17 February 2022 (aged 81); France
- Education: École nationale supérieure des beaux-arts de Lyon; Conservatoire à rayonnement régional de Lyon
- Occupation: Actor

Bernard Ballet (January 1941 – 17 February 2022) was a French actor and director.

== Biography ==
Ballet was born in Lyon in January 1941 to a large family. Seeking to become an architect, he attended the École nationale supérieure des beaux-arts de Lyon, but he was expelled from the school. He then attended the Conservatoire à rayonnement régional de Lyon and took drama classes. His first play was directed by Marcel Maréchal, who offered him an understudy role in "Compagnie du Cothurne".

From 1962 to the 1980s, Ballet appeared exclusively in plays directed by Maréchal. He also took part in cinema, appearing in dozens of films.

Ballet died on 17 February 2022, at the age of 81.

== Filmography ==
=== Cinema ===
- Uranus (1990)
- La Révolte des enfants (1991)
- The Life of the Dead (1991)
- Grand Bonheur (1992)
- L'Instinct de l'ange (1992)
- À demain (1992)
- The Birth of Love (1993)
- Hippolytes Fest (1994)
- L'Année Juliette (1995)
- Life Doesn't Scare Me (1999)
- Un chat dans la gorge (1999)
- On appelle ça... le printemps (2001)
- Trois huit (2001)
- Almost Peaceful (2002)
- Adolphe (2002)
- Du jour au lendemain (2006)

=== Short films ===
- À table (1992)
