= Balat (surname) =

Balat is a surname. Notable people with the surname include:

- Alphonse Balat (1818–1895), Belgian architect
- Isaiah Balat (1952–2014), Nigerian politician and businessman
