= Balat, Bihar =

Balat Basauli-Balat, Aunsi-Balat
- Village
- Location in Bihar, India
- Coordinates: 26°19′47″N 85°57′56″E
- Country: India
- State: Bihar
- District: Madhubani

Government
  - Type: Panchayati raj (India)
  - Body: Gram panchayat

Population (2021-22)
  - Total: 15,000

Languages
  - Official: Maithili, Hindi, Urdu
- Time zone: UTC+5:30 (IST)
- PIN: 847122
- Telephone code: 91-6272-2865**
- ISO 3166 code: IN-BR
- Vehicle registration: BR-32/ BR-07
- Coastline: 0 kilometres (0 mi)
- Nearest city: Madhubani/Darbhanga
- Sex ratio: 2:1.5 ♂/♀
- Literacy: 75%
- Lok Sabha: Madhubani
- Vidhan Sabha: Bisfi
- Police Station: Rahika
- Avg. summer temperature: 48 °C (118 °F)
- Avg. winter temperature: 5 °C (41 °F)

Balat is a village, situated around 12 km from Madhubani, state Bihar, India and around 18 km from Darbhanga.

Balat is situated in Balat-Basauli Panchayat of Madhubani Sadar (Rahika) Block.
