= Jean-Paul Lilienfeld =

French actor, writer and director (born 1962)

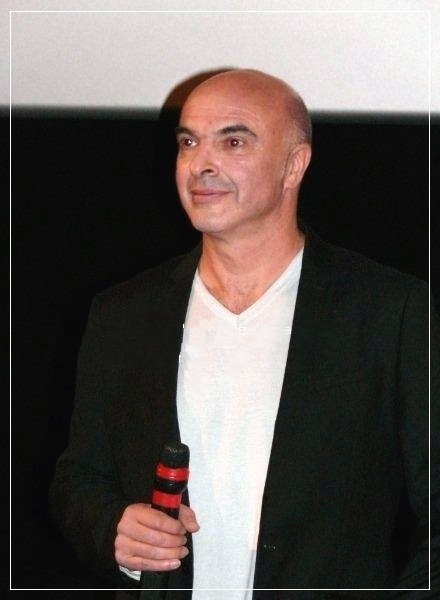
- Lilienfeld in 2013
- Born: 17 July 1962 (age 63)
- Occupations: Actor, screenwriter, film director
- Years active: 1980–present

Jean-Paul Lilienfeld (born 17 July 1962) is a French actor, writer and director. His film, La journée de la jupe, was nominated for three César Awards in 2009, including Best Film and Best Original Screenplay for Lilienfeld.

== Director filmography ==
- Il n'y a guère que les actions qui montent (1990) (short)
- Seventh Heaven (De zevende hemel) (1993)
- XY, drôle de conception (1996)
- Quatre garçons pleins d'avenir (1997)
- HS - hors service (2001)
- La journée de la jupe (2009)
- Arrêtez-moi (2012)

== Actor filmography ==
- L'été en pente douce (1987)
- La vie est à nous ! (2005)
