= Élisabeth Ballet =

French sculptor

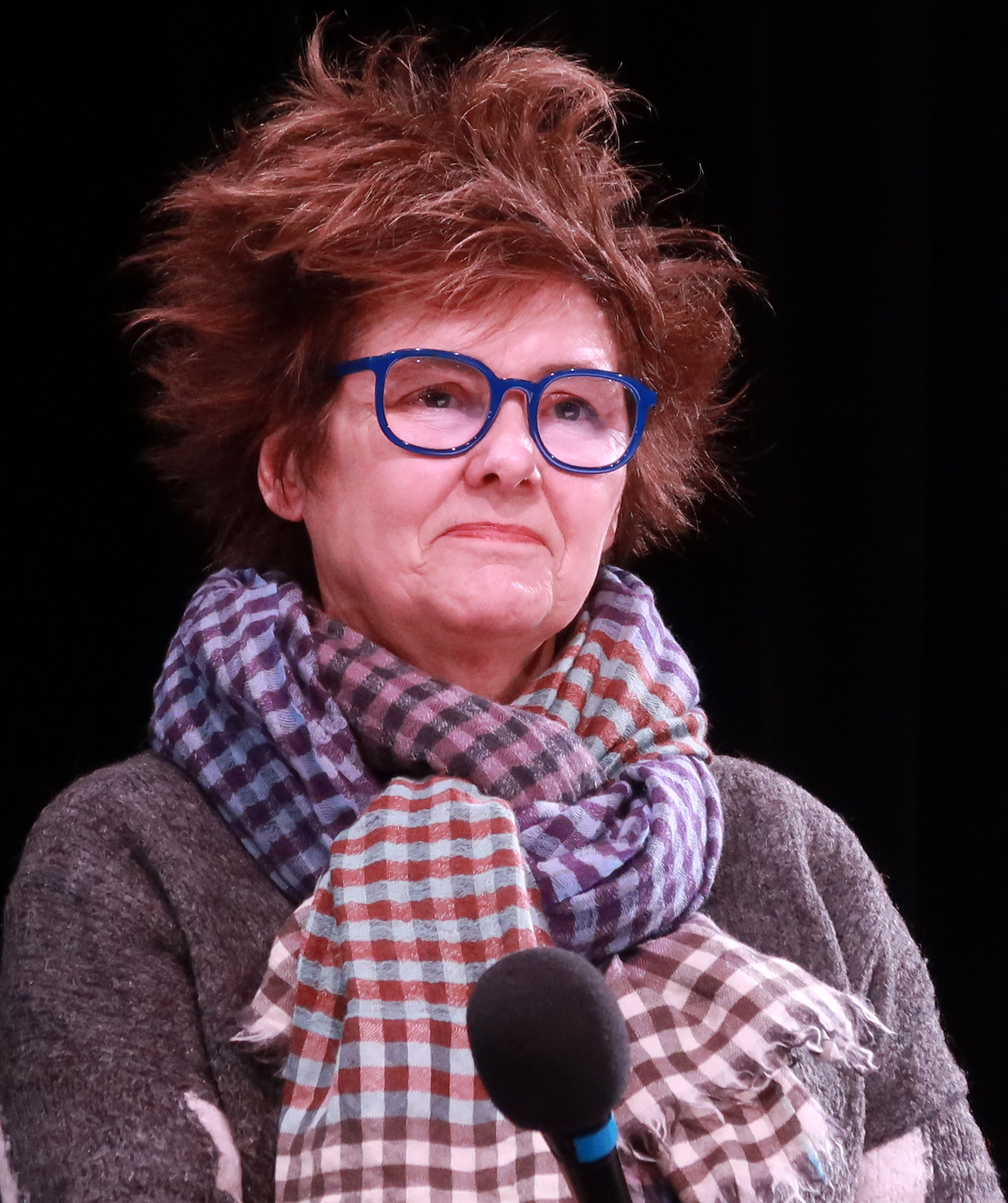
Élisabeth Ballet

Élisabeth Ballet (born 11 December 1956, at Cherbourg, in Normandy), is a French sculptor.

She was in residence at the Villa Medici in Rome in 1984 and 1985. She became known in 1985 with two sculptures made out of cardboard, Temple 5/19 février 1985 and Obélisque 4+14. An internationally renowned artist, Élisabeth Ballet now lives and works in Paris.

== Work ==
Ballet is interested in the combination of abstraction and subject taken from reality. Based on her perception of space, she has defined a program which adjusts her desires and her way of working.

Her work involves questions of movement in space, of the articulation of the outside and the inside, the transition from words to things, from drawing to sculpture, wall to center, plan to volume and more generally from one work to another. Her sculpture represents thought in action; it is totally readable (transparent surfaces, recording of their environment) and keeps the spectator at a distance. In other words, it requires the mind to wander.

== Quote ==
- "Je sculpte l'espace par l'obstacle, par la limite."

== Exhibitions and achievements ==
Solo exhibitions

- 2003 : Vie privée, Kunsthalle Göppingen, Göppingen, (Germany);
- 2004 : C'est beau dehors, Galerie Cent8 – Serge Le Borgne, Paris, France;
- 2004 : Élisabeth Ballet, Centre culturel français de Milan, Milan, Italy;
- 2007 : Sept pièces faciles, Le Grand Café – Centre d'art contemporain, Saint-Nazaire, France;
- 2008 : Lazy Days, Galerie Serge le Borgne, Paris, France.

Group exhibitions

- 2010 : Group show, Musée Bourdelle, Paris, France;
- 2010 : Spatial City: An Architecture of Idealism, Hyde Park Art Center, Chicago, IL, USA; Institute of Visual Arts Milwaukee, Milwaukee, USA; MONA Museum of New Art – Detroit's Contemporary Museum, Pontiac, USA;
- 2010 : Collection Frac-Basse-Normandie, FRAC Basse-Normandie, Caen, France.

Fairs, biennials et events

- 2009 : FIAC 09, Grand Palais, Paris, France;
- 2008 : FIAC 08, Parc des expos, Paris, France.

Collections

- FRAC Bourgogne.

Public orders

- Two-tone pavement, repeating a lace pattern, Place du Pot-d'Étain in Pont-Audemer.

== Bibliography ==
- Charles Barachon, "Élisabeth Ballet", Technikart, 2008.
- Raphael Brunel, "Lazy days", Paris-art.com, 04-2008.
- Yoan Gourmel, "Élisabeth Ballet, sept pièces faciles", Zéro 2, 2007, n° 41, p. 44.
- Élisabeth Vedrenne, " Élisabeth Ballet, Lazy Days ", Semaines, 05.2008, n° 10.
- Élisabeth Vedrenne, " Sur la route d'Élisabeth Ballet ", Connaissances des arts, 05-2008, n° 660, p. 128.
