= Prem Raj =

Indian film director

- Other names: Prem Soni
- Occupations: Bollywood Film Director, Screenwriter

Prem Raj, also known as Prem Soni, is an Indian film director. He has directed Main Aurr Mrs Khanna (2009) and Ishkq in Paris (2013).

== Filmography ==
- Main Aurr Mrs Khanna (2009)
- Ishkq in Paris (2013)
