= Julius Billeter =

Swiss genealogist (1869–1957)

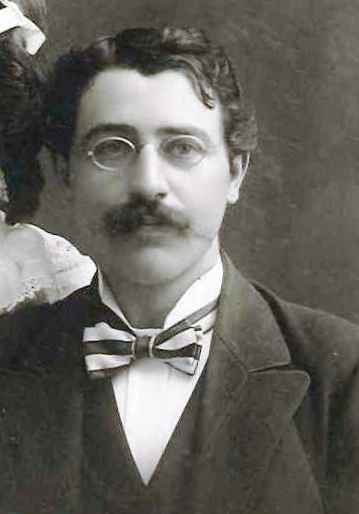
Julius Billeter (1869–1957) July 1899, Salt Lake City, Utah

Julius Billeter, Jr. (October 14, 1869 – July 9, 1957) was a Swiss genealogist.

== Biography ==
Billeter was the second of ten children and eldest son of Julius Billeter Sr. (1842–1922) and Barbara Billeter (née Zweifel; 1843–1930). Barbara Zweifel Billeter had joined the Church of Jesus Christ of Latter-day Saints (LDS Church) early on.

=== Immigration to the United States ===
Some six weeks before her husband joined the church in 1882, 12-year-old Julius immigrated to Utah under the care of returning Mormon missionary Ulrich Stauffer (1838–1905).

Upon arriving in Utah, Billeter lived with the Stauffer family in the town of Willard, where he helped out on the farm. In 1883, he moved to Salt Lake City, where he learned to be a carpenter. Billeter's parents and siblings arrived in Utah in 1884.

Billeter and Marie Emilie Wilker (1873–1951) were married on June 24, 1891, in the Logan Utah temple of the Church of Jesus Christ of Latter-day Saints. They had become acquainted with each other on the ship upon emigrating from Switzerland. They became the parents of two daughters and three sons.

=== Return to Switzerland ===
Less than four weeks after the birth of his first daughter in 1892, Billeter returned to Switzerland and proselyted for two years as a missionary in the Swiss-German Mission of the LDS Church. Marie and their infant daughter moved to Paris, Bear Lake County, Idaho, where she lived with her widowed mother, Maria Emilie Wilker (née Kuenzlin; 1842–1930).

In the spring of 1894, Billeter started doing intensive genealogical research in order to take the many lists of names with him upon his return to the United States. His defined goal was to compile genealogies for his fellow believers. The Church of Jesus Christ of Latter-day Saints builds temples in which worthy members receive sacred ordinances. In order to enable deceased family members to receive such ordinances, it is necessary to genealogically identify the dead which is the reason the Mormons so actively pursue genealogy.

=== Back in the United States ===
When Billeter returned to Utah in July 1894, the Salt Lake Temple – built in neo-Gothic style according to plans of church architect Truman Osborn Angell (1810–1887) and dedicated in April 1893 – was in full operations. Emilie Wilker Billeter, who had worked independently as a seamstress in Paris, Idaho, moved back to Salt Lake City with her daughter and the Billeter family was reunited.

In November 1894, the "Genealogical Society of Utah" was organized by the Church o fJesus Christ of Latter-day Saints as an impetus to help church members obtain the names of their deceased relatives from records of their native countries. Billeter was among the first to join with a life membership.

Billeter considered his membership in the Genealogical Society of Utah as helping him to achieve his goal. His basic suggestion was that genealogy should be pursued as field research in Switzerland and southern Germany. Professor Richard Theodor Haag (1867–1947) of the Latter-day Saints' College in Salt Lake City and a native of Stuttgart, Germany, supported Billeter's recommendation. Gradually, other church leaders expressed their support and finally, the First Presidency of the church gave their full approval.

On January 24, 1896, the "Salt Lake Beobachter", a weekly, German-language newspaper published in Salt Lake City at that time, reported: "According to the carefully developed plans of these brethren supported by the Authorities – a qualified representative will leave in the near future for Germany and Switzerland to help those who are sufficiently interested to make a prepayment of Five Dollars for each record." For some two weeks shortly thereafter, Billeter traveled to a number of communities south of the capital city to organize additional commissions.

=== Second Mission in Switzerland ===
In April 1896, Billeter departed Salt Lake City to fulfill a second mission in Switzerland and southern Germany. This time, however, his main goal was to conduct genealogical research in order to produce family genealogy records. He found living quarters with another missionary in the city of Burgdorf, but he decided to do his initial research in the Bernese Oberland. From day to day he copied names and dates from old church records and citizens' registers; whenever possible he remained in a village or town for three or four days. Various place names are mentioned in his letters: Lauterbrunnen, Zweiluetschinen, Luetschental, Burglauenen, Grindelwald, Interlaken and Unterseen, as well as Zweisimmen and Erlenbach im Simmental, along with Rueegsau, Huttwil, Kallnach, Bruettelen, Erlach, Biel, etc.

=== Back in Utah ===
Billeter returned to Salt Lake City in May 1897. The "Deseret Evening News" reported on his success: he had copied more than 100,000 names from old registers for his family genealogy records. Emilie returned from Paris, Idaho, a second time, but with two daughters. During Billeter's absence, Haag had accepted a position at the "Weber Stake Academy" in Ogden, Utah, and therefore moved away from the Mormon capital.

In order to better coordinate his work with Haag, Billeter moved his family to Ogden, where Emilie opened a dressmaking shop on the city's main street. During the transitional period of getting settled, the Billeter daughters were with their maternal grandmother in Paris, Idaho. While playing there on a stack of piled logs, the younger daughter – not yet two years old – fell. She died in December 1898 from what the doctors concluded to be injuries from her lung having been pierced.

Billeter worked devotedly on compiling family records. In early 1898, the division of the Swiss-German Mission was announced by church authorities. Hamburg became headquarters of the new "German Mission" and the publication of "Der Stern" – the German-language publication – was also transferred to Hamburg. Bern remained as headquarters of the "Swiss Mission."

In mid-February 1898, the "Deseret Semi-weekly News" published a statement from the president of the Genealogical Society of Utah – LDS apostle Franklin D. Richards (1821-1899) – that a tentative agreement had been made with Julius Billeter to go on another genealogy mission to Switzerland and southern Germany. A month later, church officials announced that Haag had been called on a mission to Hamburg as a translator; he left Utah a few weeks later. A few days after his departure, the Billeter family moved back to Salt Lake City from Ogden.

=== The Third Mission in Switzerland ===
The local newspaper reported in June that in the fall of 1898 Billeter was planning on returning to German-speaking Europe on a new mission. For unknown reasons, his departure was delayed for several months.

It was July 1899 when Billeter bid his family farewell for a third time to go on a mission. "The Millennial Star," the British publication of the church, reported in the August 10 issue, that "Elder Julius Billeter Jr. of Salt Lake City, who is going to the German-speaking countries as an agent of the Genealogical Society of Utah," had arrived safely, and would be doing "as much work in this line [of genealogical research] as his other duties will allow."

Billeter settled in Veltheim near the city of Winterthur. Emilie and their elder surviving daughter joined him there in late November 1900. At the latest, he began working as a genealogist at the beginning of the 20th century (rather than merely between 1910 and 1950).

Around 1903/04, Susanna Klossner Herzog (1834-1906) commissioned Billeter to compile records of her Klossner and Wampfler ancestors from Diemtigen. Shortly after receiving the lists of relatives from those two families, she submitted the first names to the Logan Utah temple for ordinance processing.

Between July 1903 and April 1909, three sons were born to the Billeter family. Immediately prior to being released as a Mormon missionary, Ezra Louie Kunz (1887-1985) noted the following in his diary on 7 June 1909: "I spent the day mostely at Billeters talking over genealogy."

Billeter was very successful in the following years. His work enabled significantly more ordinances to be completed in Mormon temples.

=== Return to Salt Lake City ===
Communication, however, became extremely difficult and finally impossible during the war years. With church assistance, the six members of the Billeter family were able to become passengers on one of the first ships to sail from France after the Armistice of Compiègne was signed on November 11, 1918, and return to their home in Utah.

Not long thereafter, the descendants of numerous earlier Mormon immigrants from Switzerland realized that as a result of Billeter's return they were no longer enabled to obtain genealogy records. Numerous people offered Billeter substantial prepayments if he would consider going back to Europe.

=== Another Mission in Switzerland ===
In November 1921, Billeter and Emilie accepted a church call to go on another "genealogical mission". They returned to Switzerland and settled in the city of St. Gallen.

When the Swiss Society for Genealogical Studies was founded in September 1933, Julius Billeter was one of the founding members. In the first general meeting, Billeter, nearly 64 years of age, encouraged his younger colleagues in their undertaking.

The Billeters returned to Salt Lake City in 1945 after World War II. However, Emilie Billeter had difficulty in adjusting to postwar America and became homesick for the Swiss mountains and the "Swiss way of life." In 1946, 78-year-old Julius Billeter and Emilie went back to Switzerland and he again began doing genealogical research.

In September 1951, Emilie died in St. Gallen. With the assistance of Rosa Holzer (1897-1979), who worked as his secretary for over 25 years, Julius Billeter continued his genealogy work. A stroke reduced his capacity to work and he died in July 1957 in St. Gallen.

Other Mormon genealogists continued working for their fellow believers in Billeter's tradition, including Ernst Arm (1909-1982), Alfred Friedrich Reichen (1897-1985) and Friedrich Julius Wysard (1896-1973).

Despite the sympathetic obituary written by Robert Oehler – the former Latin teacher and as of 1932 a staff member at the Swiss National Library, who was responsible for the two volume, first edition of "Familiennamenbuch der Schweiz" ["Swiss Family Surname Book"] – the results of Julius Billeter's genealogical research are to be used very cautiously with constructive criticism.

== Bibliography ==
- Julius Caesar Billeter: Julius Billeter, Pioneer Swiss Genealogist: A Man of Faith and Action, Salt Lake City, 1980.
- Manuel Aicher: Der Genealoge Julius Billeter und die Zuverlässigkeit seiner Arbeiten, in: Archiv für Familiengeschichtsforschung, 2. Jg., Heft 1, März 1998.
- Paul-Anthon Nielson: Observations on the Swiss Genealogical Research of Julius Billeter in Comparison with Original Bernese Vital Records, in: Genealogica & Heraldica Copenhagen 1980.
