= Jean François Billeter =

Swiss sinologist (born 1939)

Jean François Billeter Chinese name : 毕来德 / 畢來德 Bì Láidé, born 1939 in Basel, Switzerland, is a Swiss sinologist and honorary professor of the University of Geneva, where he created the sinology department in 1987. After directing it for twelve years, he retired in 1999 to spend more time writing.

In 1962 he began studying Chinese in Paris and continued his studies in Beijing between 1963 and 1966, specializing in classical literature at the University of Beijing from 1964. J.F. Billeter defended his thesis on the philosopher Li Zhi (1527-1602) in Geneva in 1976 and published it in 1979. In 1971, Billeter was appointed assistant at the Ostasiatisches Seminar (Eastern Asian Studies Seminar) at the University of Zurich, where he remained active until 1978. When he left the university early in 1999 to dedicate himself to his own research, he published a summary of his experience in a thesis on Chinese studies in Geneva and elsewhere.

In 1966, he married Cui Wen, a young woman from Beijing who practiced medicine.

== Works ==
- Li Zhi, philosophe maudit (1527-1602), Droz, Genève, 1979 (298 p.) ISBN 2600040862 ; rééd. Allia, Paris, 280 p., 2024 ISBN 979-1030416169
- Le système des statuts de classe en République populaire de Chine, IHEI, Genève, 1986. (100 p.), repris dans Revue européenne des sciences sociales (Genève) 1987, et dans Stuart R. Schram, ed., The Scope of State Power in China, SOAS, Londres, 1985.
- L’Art chinois de l’écriture, Skira, Genève, 1989 (320 p.). Réédité par Skira, Milan, puis par Allia, Paris, en 2010, dans une édition remaniée intitulée Essai sur l'art chinois de l'écriture et ses fondements (414 p.). L'ouvrage a reçu le prix Stanislas Julien de l'Académie française en 1990. La traduction anglaise, The Chinese Art of Writing, Rizzoli, New York, 1990, n'est pas satisfaisante et n'a pas été rééditée.
- Mémoire sur les études chinoises à Genève et ailleurs, Genève, 1998. (95 p.)
- Chine trois fois muette, suivi de : Bref essai sur l’histoire de Chine, d’après Spinoza, Allia, Paris, 2000, (148 p.)ISBN 979-10-304-1047-1. Traduit en chinois (Taipei).
- Leçons sur Tchouang-tseu, Allia, Paris, 2002, (152 p.)ISBN 978-2-84485-793-4. Quatre leçons données au Collège de France en 2000 à l'invitation de Pierre-Étienne Will. Traduit en chinois (Pékin, Taipei), allemand, italien, espagnol, japonais.
- Études sur Tchouang-tseu, Allia, Paris, 2006 (294 p.)ISBN 979-10-304-1367-0
- Contre François Jullien, Allia, Paris, 2006. (122 p.). édition augmentée 2018, (141 p.) ISBN 979-10-304-0840-9
- Notes sur Tchouang-tseu et la philosophie, Allia, Paris, 2010 (112 p.)ISBN 978-2-84485-370-7. Traduit en chinois (Taipei).
- Un paradigme, Allia, 2012 (126 p.). Traduit en allemand.
- Trois essais sur la traduction, Allia, Paris, 2014 (120 p.), devenus en 2014 Quatre essais sur la traduction (137 p.)ISBN 979-10-304-0985-7
- Lichtenberg, Allia, Paris, 2014 (168 p.)ISBN 978-2-84485-901-3
- Esquisses, Allia, Paris, 2016 (128 p.), édition remaniée 2021, (108 p.) ISBN 979-10-304-1368-7. Traduit en allemand.
- Une rencontre à Pékin, Allia, Paris, 2017 (150 p.)ISBN 979-10-304-0685-6
- Une autre Aurélia, Allia, Paris, 2017 (92 p.)ISBN 979-10-304-0682-5
- Demain l'Europe, Allia, Paris, 2019 (47 p.)ISBN 979-10-304-1016-7. Traduit en allemand.
- Pourquoi l'Europe, réflexions d'un sinologue, Allia, Paris, 2020 (141 p.)ISBN 979-10-304-2232-0. Traduit en portugais.
- Le Propre du sujet, Allia, Paris, 2021 (55 p.) ISBN 979-10-304-1362-5
- L'Art d'enseigner le chinois, Allia, Paris, 2021 (63 p.)ISBN 979-10-304-1357-1
- Les Gestes du chinois, Allia, Paris, 2021 (93 p.)ISBN 979-10-304-1352-6
- Héraclite, le sujet. Paris: Allia. 2022. ISBN 979-10-304-1553-7.
- Court Traité du langage et des choses. Paris: Allia. 2022. ISBN 979-10-304-1512-4.
- Bonnard, Giacometti, P. Paris: Allia. 2023. ISBN 979-10-304-1626-8.
- Une révolution dans la pensée. Paris: Allia. 2023. ISBN 979-10-304-1734-0.
