= Pierre Lhomme =

French cinematographer and filmmaker (1930–2019)

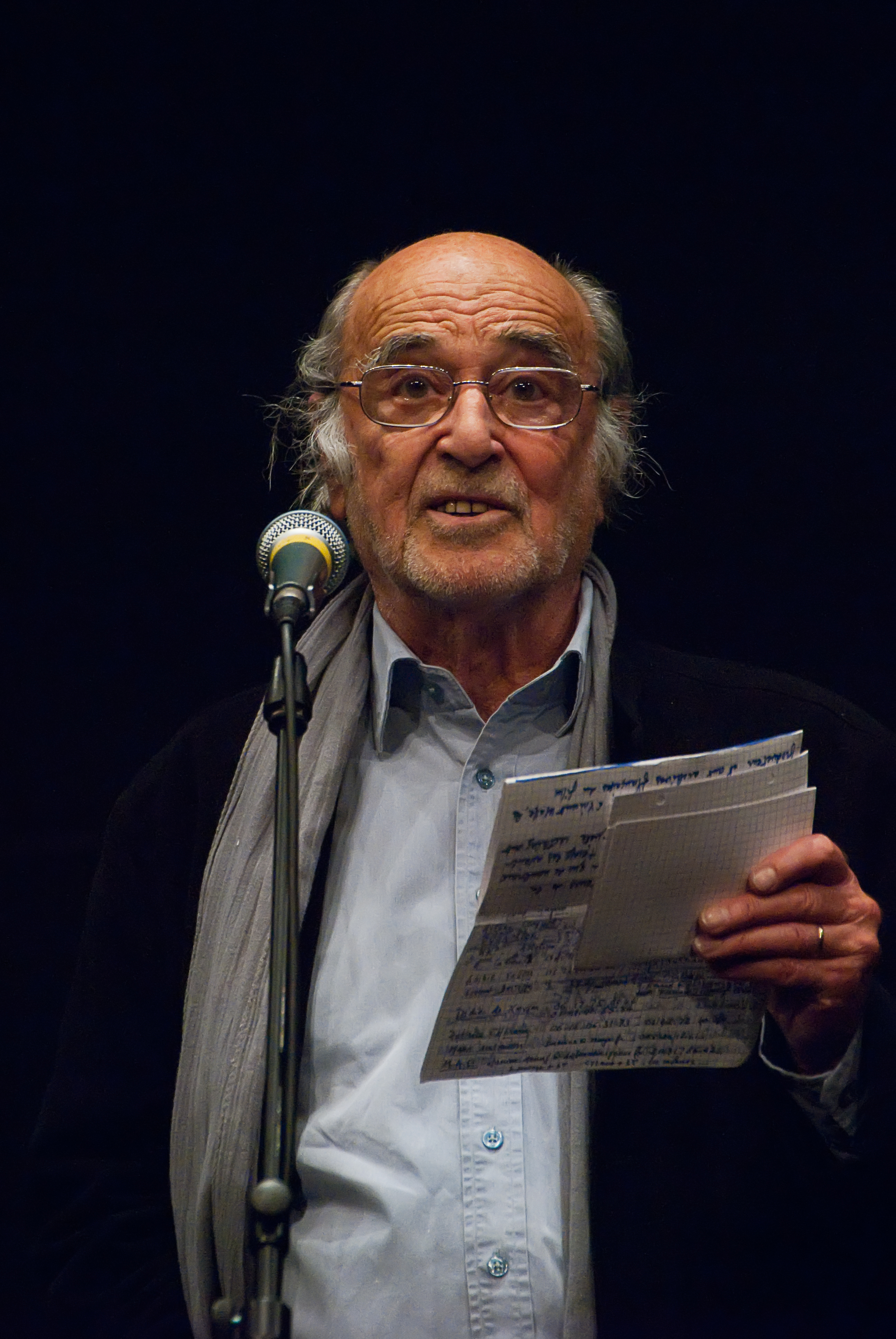
- Pierre Lhomme
- Born: 5 April 1930; Boulogne-Billancourt, France
- Died: 4 July 2019 (aged 89); Arles, France
- Occupation(s): Cinematographer, director, screenwriter
- Years active: 1953–2003
- Children: 1

Pierre Lhomme (French pronunciation: [pjɛʁ lɔm]; 5 April 1930 – 4 July 2019) was a French cinematographer and filmmaker.

== Filmography ==
- 2002 : Le Divorce by James Ivory
- 1999 : Cotton Mary by Ismail Merchant
- 1998 : Voleur de vie by Yves Angelo
- 1997 : Les Palmes de Monsieur Schultz by Claude Pinoteau
- 1996 : Anna Oz by Éric Rochant
- 1996 : Mon homme by Bertrand Blier
- 1994 : Jefferson in Paris by James Ivory
- 1994 : Oh God, Women Are So Loving by Magali Clément
- 1992 : Toxic Affair by Philomène Esposito
- 1992 : Promenade d'été by René Féret
- 1991 : The Voyager by Volker Schlöndorff
- 1990 : Cyrano de Bergerac by Jean-Paul Rappeneau - Won for César Awards Best Photography / BAFTA BSC Award
- 1989 : Baptême by René Féret - Won : 1 er prix de l'image à Chalon-sur-Saône
- 1988 : Camille Claudel by Bruno Nuytten - Won for César Awards Best Photography
- 1987 : Charlie Dingo by Gilles Béhat
- 1987 : Maurice by James Ivory
- 1986 : Champagne amer by Ridha Behi
- 1985 : Urgence by Gilles Béhat
- 1985 : My Little Girl by Connie Kaiserman
- 1984 : Mistral's Daughter by Kevin Connor (TV)
- 1983 : Le Grand carnaval by Alexandre Arcady
- 1982 : Mortelle randonnée by Claude Miller - Nominated for César Awards Best Photography
- 1981 : Tout feu tout flamme by Jean-Paul Rappeneau
- 1981 : Quartet by James Ivory
- 1980 : 44 ou les récits de la nuit by Moumen Smihi
- 1980 : La Fille prodigue by Jacques Doillon
- 1979 : Aurélia Steiner by Marguerite Duras
- 1979 : Le Navire Night by Marguerite Duras
- 1979 : Les Mains négatives by Marguerite Duras
- 1979 : Retour à la bien-aimée by Jean-François Adam
- 1978 : Judith Therpauve by Patrice Chéreau - Nominated for César Awards Best Photography
- 1977 : Dites-lui que je l'aime by Claude Miller - Nominated for César Awards Best Photography
- 1976 : Les Enfants du placard by Benoît Jacquot
- 1976 : L'Ombre des châteaux by Daniel Duval
- 1976 : Une sale histoire by Jean Eustache
- 1976 : The Savage State by Francis Girod
- 1975 : Le Grand délire by Denis Berry
- 1974 : La Chair de l'orchidée by Patrice Chéreau - Nominated for César Awards Best Photography
- 1974 : Sweet Movie by Dusan Makavejev
- 1974 : Le Sauvage by Jean-Paul Rappeneau - Nominated for César Awards Best Photography
- 1974 : La Solitude du chanteur de fond by Chris Marker
- 1973 : Je ne sais rien mais je dirai tout by Pierre Richard
- 1973 : M comme Mathieu by Jean-François Adam
- 1972 : Sex shop by Claude Berri
- 1972 : La Maman et la putain by Jean Eustache
- 1971 : Quatre nuits d'un rêveur by Robert Bresson
- 1971 : Quelqu'un derrière la porte by Nicolas Gessner
- 1971 : La Vieille fille by Jean-Pierre Blanc
- 1970 : Festival panafricain d'Alger by William Klein
- 1969 : L'Armée des ombres by Jean-Pierre Melville
- 1969 : Le Plus vieux métier du monde by Claude Autant-Lara, Philippe de Broca Jean-Luc Godard
- 1968 : À bientôt, j'espère by Chris Marker & Mario Marret
- 1968 : La Chamade by Alain Cavalier
- 1968 : Mr. Freedom by William Klein
- 1968 : Le Dernier homme by Charles Bitsch
- 1967 : Mise à sac by Alain Cavalier
- 1967 : Le Roi de cœur by Philippe de Broca
- 1967 : Coplan sauve sa peau by Yves Boisset
- 1966 : La Vie de château by Jean-Paul Rappeneau
- 1965 : Le Mistral by Joris Ivens
- 1965 : Métamorphose du paysage by Éric Rohmer (TV)
- 1962 : Le Joli Mai by Chris Marker & Pierre Lhomme
- 1961 : Le Combat dans l'île by Alain Cavalier
- 1960 : Saint-Tropez Blues by Marcel Moussy
