= The Case of the Grinning Cat =

2004 television film directed by Chris Marker

The Case of the Grinning Cat (original French title: Chats Perchés) is a 2004 essay film by Left Bank filmmaker Chris Marker. The film documents the mysterious M. Chat graffiti appearing around Paris, juxtaposed with post-9/11 political and international events of the early 2000s.

The film is a sequel of sorts to Marker's 1977 film A Grin Without a Cat.

== Critical review ==
The film has a 7.2 rating on IMDb and a 94% critics rating on Rotten Tomatoes.
