= A Matter of Resistance =

1966 film by Jean-Paul Rappeneau

- Theatrical release poster
- French: La Vie de château
- Directed by: Jean-Paul Rappeneau
- Screenplay by: Jean-Paul Rappeneau; Alain Cavalier (Note: Collaboration); Claude Sautet
- Dialogue by: Daniel Boulanger
- Produced by: Nicole Stéphane
- Starring: Catherine Deneuve; Pierre Brasseur; Philippe Noiret; Henri Garcin
- Cinematography: Pierre Lhomme
- Edited by: Pierre Gillette
- Music by: Michel Legrand
- Production companies: Ancinex; Cobela Films; La Guéville
- Distributed by: UGC
- Release date: 25 January 1966 (France)
- Running time: 90 minutes
- Country: France
- Languages: French; English

A Matter of Resistance (French: La Vie de château) is a 1966 French romantic comedy film co-written and directed by Jean-Paul Rappeneau, and starring Catherine Deneuve, Pierre Brasseur, Philippe Noiret and Henri Garcin. Set on the coast of Normandy in the summer of 1944, it received the Louis Delluc Prize in 1965.

== Plot ==
On the coast of Normandy in May 1944, the peaceable Jérôme lives in his crumbling château with his widowed mother and his beautiful young wife Marie, daughter of Dimanche, a local farmer. She is fed up with country life and dreams of a glamorous existence in Paris. Snooping around the estate is a stranger named Julien who fascinates Marie, seeing in him a means of escaping the twin boredoms of rusticity and matrimony. In fact he is a Free French officer liaising with Dimanche, who heads the local Resistance, to survey German fortifications before the imminent Allied landings. On the cliff outside the château the Germans have mounted a huge naval gun in an impenetrable blockhouse and Julien deduces that it will have to be taken from behind by parachutists.

When German reinforcements arrive, their commander Klopstock is billeted on the family and falls immediately in love with Marie. Julien, also lost in adoration of Marie, is introduced to him as her brother. When Klopstock catches the two kissing after dinner, for which he supplied the champagne, they knock him out with a billiard cue and flee together. Klopstock locks Jérôme and the mother in the cellar under guard and sets off with the rest of his men to catch the fugitives. When Dimanche comes to the château, he is locked up too.

It is the mild Jérôme who escapes from the cellar and, retrieving a hidden shotgun, locks up the guards. When Dimanche explains that American paratroops are being dropped that night and must be guided to the back of the blockhouse, Jérôme says that the Germans have covered the landing zone with stakes. The two men and the mother desperately pull up the stakes as Allied aircraft mass overhead. They lead the Americans to the blockhouse but when they enter its perimeter they are caught in a powerful searchlight and have to retreat hastily. Jérôme, still dressed for dinner, walks into the beam and engages the Germans in incoherent conversation until he is close enough to throw a grenade that knocks out the light. After the Americans storm the place, Marie finds her way back and is reunited with her hero husband. Julien, who for the sake of a pretty face failed in his duty, faces disciplinary proceedings. Shells from Allied ships demolish much of the château while Jérôme and Marie, having joined the Resistance, enter Paris with its liberators.

The film was released shortly after winning the Louis-Delluc Prize and was exclusively shown in only certain theaters for a whole year.

== Cast ==
- Catherine Deneuve (English dub: Sylviane Mathieu) as Marie
- Philippe Noiret as Jérôme
- Pierre Brasseur as Dimanche
- Mary Marquet as Charlotte, Jérôme's mother
- Henri Garcin as Julien
- Carlos Thompson as major Klopstock
- Marc Dudicourt as Schimmelbeck
- Robert Moor as Plantier, the gardener
- Donald O'Brien as the American officer
- Paul Le Person as Roger
