= M. Chat =

Graffiti cat by Thoma Vuille

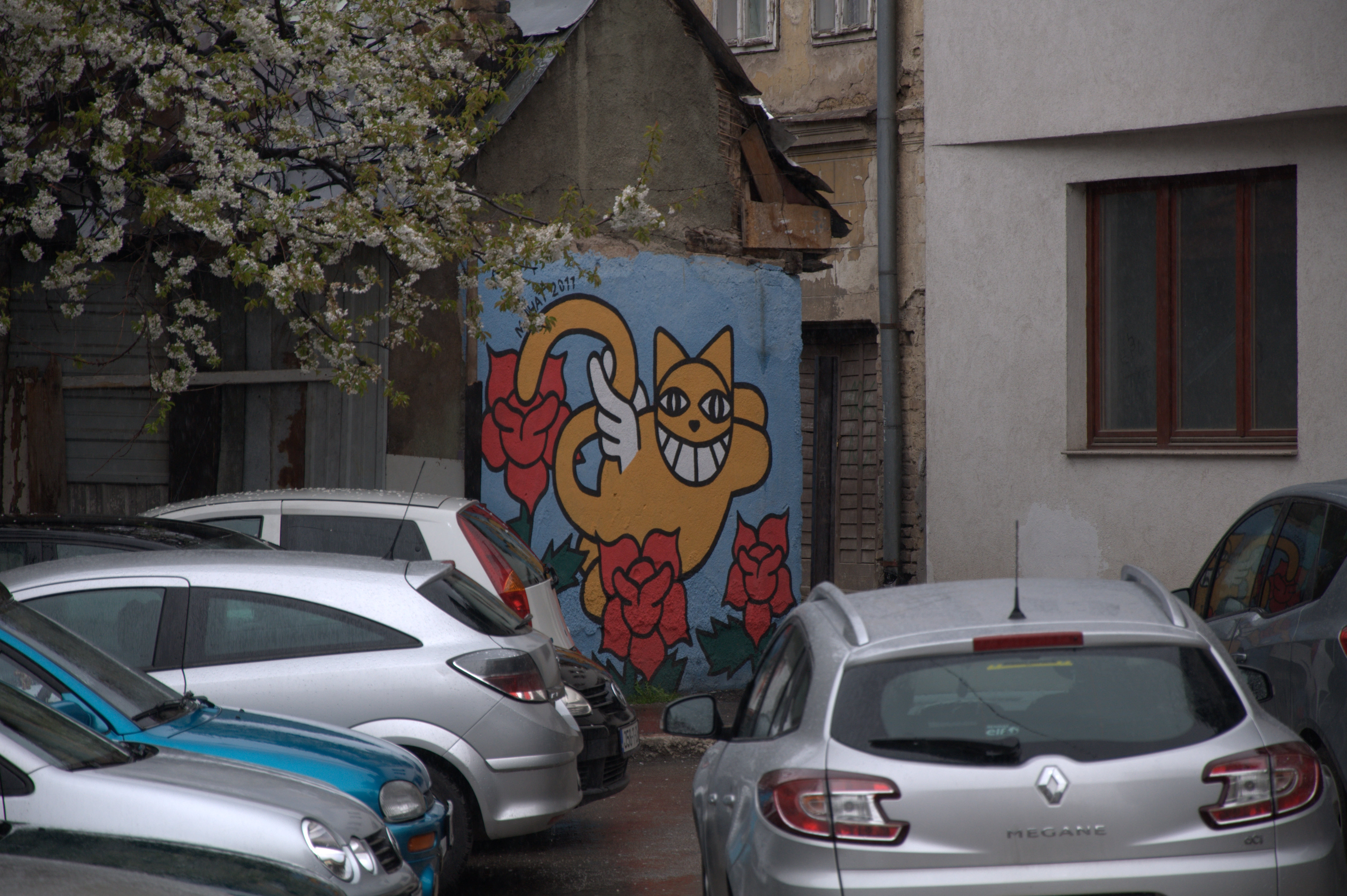
M. Chat in Sarajevo, Bosnia and Herzegovina

M. Chat (also known as Monsieur Chat and Mr Chat) is the name of a graffiti cat that originally appeared in Orléans, France in 1997. The graffiti appeared most frequently on chimneys, but was also sighted in other places, such as train platforms and at political rallies. The artist was originally anonymous, but in 2007, Thoma Vuille, born in 1977, in Boudry, in the canton of Neuchâtel, was caught in the act of creating the cat.

The yellow cartoon cat is characterized by its large Cheshire Cat grin and body. The cat is most often portrayed in a running pose, but has also been variously depicted waving signal flags, bouncing on a ball, sporting angel wings, and waving in greeting at the entrance to a train station. It is sometimes accompanied by the tag "M. Chat" in small letters.

A 2004 documentary, Chats perchés (The Case of the Grinning Cat), by film maker Chris Marker, used the phenomenon of M. Chat's appearance across France as a springboard for a reflection on the state of the country post-9/11.

During a 2010 exhibition in Paris, Vuille claimed to have 60 cats across the French capital.

There are currently two in New York City, of which one is on the High Line at 28th Street. Another example was located on the SE Corner of 27th and 8th Avenue by the FIT Museum, but has since been covered by other graffiti. There is one on a barn in Stamford, Vermont.

There are currently three in Pristina, Kosovo on the central pedestrianised area. One is on the side of the National Theatre. There are some in Vietnam, too. Additionally, there are several in Naples, Sarajevo, Bosnia and Herzegovina and Belgrade, Serbia. One has also been seen in Seoul, South Korea and one in Tangier, Morocco.
