= All Fired Up (film) =

- Directed by: Jean-Paul Rappeneau
- Written by: Jean-Paul Rappeneau; Joyce Buñuel; Élisabeth Rappeneau
- Produced by: Philippe Dussart
- Starring: Yves Montand; Isabelle Adjani
- Cinematography: Pierre Lhomme
- Edited by: Marie-Josèphe Yoyotte
- Music by: Michel Berger
- Distributed by: Gaumont Distribution
- Release date: 13 January 1982
- Running time: 108 minutes
- Country: France
- Language: French
- Box office: $17.1 million

All Fired Up (French: Tout feu, tout flamme) is a 1982 French comedy film directed by Jean-Paul Rappeneau, starring Yves Montand and Isabelle Adjani.The film premiered on 13 January 1982. It had 2,279,445 admissions in France.

== Plot ==
It tells the story of a man who works with shady casino operations abroad. When he returns to Paris in need of money, he is unaware that his eldest daughter has begun to work for the ministry of finance.

== Cast ==
- Yves Montand as Victor Valance
- Isabelle Adjani as Pauline Valance
- Alain Souchon as Antoine Quentin
- Lauren Hutton as Jane
- Jean-Luc Bideau as Raoul Sarazin
- Pinkas Braun as Monsieur Nash
- Jean-Pierre Miquel as the minister of finance
- Jean Rougerie as the doctor
- Madeleine Cheminat as Mme Valance
- Jeanne Lallemand as Delphine Valance
- Amélie Gonin as Juliette Valance
- Facundo Bo as Nash' secretary
- Pierre Le Rumeur as M. Brenno
- Rose Thierry as Mme Chapon
