= Exact Change =

American publishing company

Exact Change is an American independent book publishing company founded in 1989 by Damon Krukowski and Naomi Yang who, outside of their publishing careers, are musicians associated with Galaxie 500 and Damon and Naomi. The company specialises in re-publishing 19th- and 20th-century avant-garde literature and has published works by John Cage, Salvador Dalí and Denton Welch among many others.

== Selected publications ==
- The Heresiarch & Co., The Poet Assassinated - Guillaume Apollinaire
- The Adventures of Telemachus, Paris Peasant - Louis Aragon
- Watchfiends and Rack Screams - Antonin Artaud
- Composition in Retrospect - John Cage
- The Hearing Trumpet - Leonora Carrington
- Hebdomeros - Giorgio de Chirico
- Oui - Salvador Dalí
- Give My Regards to Eighth Street - Morton Feldman
- The Death and Letters of Alice James - Alice James
- The Supermale, Exploits & Opinions of Dr. Faustroll, Pataphysician - Alfred Jarry
- The Blue Octavo Notebooks - Franz Kafka
- Maldoror and the complete works - Comte de Lautréamont
- Immemory (CD-ROM) - Chris Marker
- Aurélia and other writings - Gérard de Nerval
- The Book of Disquiet, The Education of the Stoic - Fernando Pessoa
- The Burial of the Count of Orgaz & other poems - Pablo Picasso
- How I wrote Certain of my Books - Raymond Roussel
- PPPPPP - Kurt Schwitters
- Everybody's Autobiography - Gertrude Stein
- In Youth is Pleasure - Denton Welch
- Slow Under Construction - André Breton, Paul Eluard and Rene Char
