= Be Seeing You (film) =

1968 French documentary film

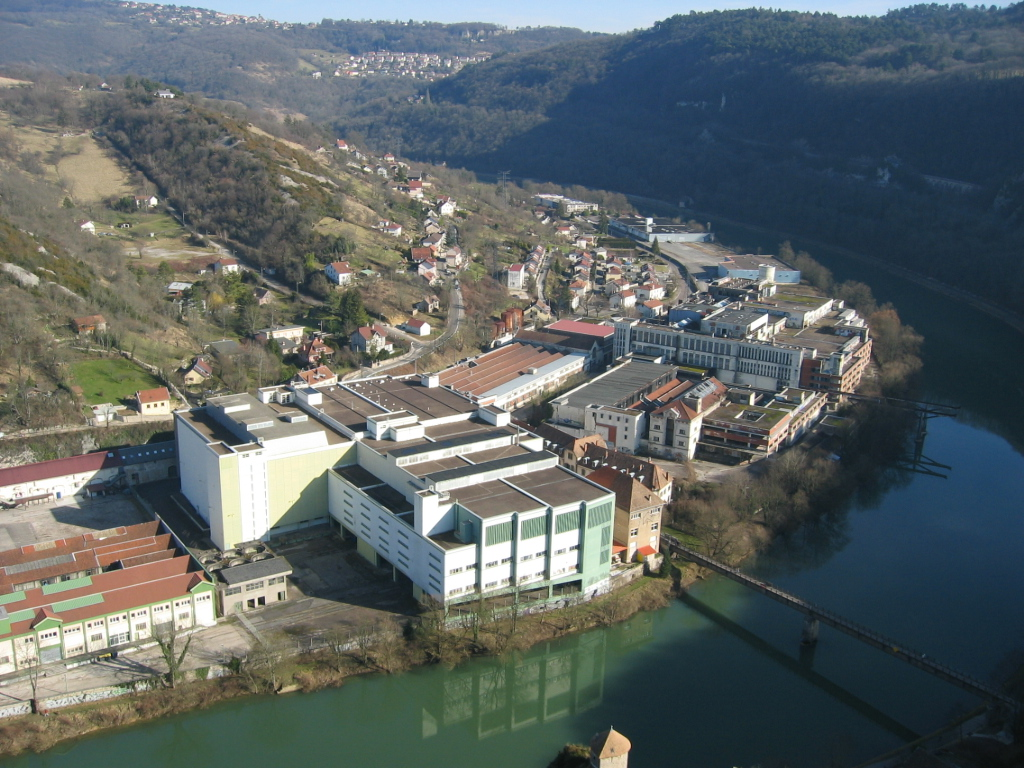
- Former Rhodia textile factory
- À bientôt, j'espère
- Directed by: Chris Marker; Mario Marret
- Release date: 1968
- Running time: 55 minutes
- Country: France
- Language: French

Be Seeing You (In French: À bientôt, j'espère; literally translates to Until soon, I hope) is a 1968 French documentary film directed by Chris Marker and Mario Marret. It tells the story of a strike action at the Rhodiaceta textile factory in Besançon in March 1967. The film was shot in black and white, with photography by Pierre Lhomme.
