= Le Joli Mai =

- Directed by: Chris Marker; Pierre Lhomme
- Written by: Chris Marker, Catherine Varlin
- Produced by: Andre Heinrich
- Narrated by: Yves Montand; Simone Signoret
- Cinematography: Pierre Lhomme; Étienne Becker
- Music by: Michel Legrand
- Release date: 1 May 1963
- Running time: 165 minutes
- Country: France
- Language: French

Le Joli Mai ("The Lovely Month of May") is a 1963 French documentary film by Chris Marker and Pierre Lhomme.

Beginning in the spring of 1962, just after the close of the Algerian War and the Évian Accords, Marker and his cinematographer Pierre Lhomme shot 55 hours of footage interviewing people on the streets of Paris.

The questions, asked by the unseen Marker, range from their personal lives to social and political issues of the day. As he had with montages of landscapes and indigenous art, Marker created a film essay that contrasts and juxtaposes a variety of lives with his signature commentary (spoken by Marker's friends, singer-actor Yves Montand in the French version and Simone Signoret in the English version). The film has been compared to the cinéma vérité films of Jean Rouch, and criticized by its practitioners at the time. It was shown in competition at the 1963 Venice Film Festival, where it won the award for Best First Work. It also won the Golden Dove Award at the Leipzig DOK Festival.

Le Joli Mai was Marker's first project after he made the 1962 science fiction short La Jetée, perhaps his most famous film.

Le Joli Mai was shown as part of the Cannes Classics section of the 2013 Cannes Film Festival.
