= A.K. (film) =

1985 French documentary film

- Directed by: Chris Marker
- Written by: Chris Marker
- Produced by: Serge Silberman
- Starring: Akira Kurosawa; Chris Marker; Tatsuya Nakadai; Ishirō Honda
- Cinematography: Frans-Yves Marescot
- Edited by: Chris Marker
- Music by: Tōru Takemitsu
- Release date: 20 May 1985
- Running time: 75 minutes
- Country: France
- Languages: French; Japanese

A.K. is a 1985 French documentary film directed by Chris Marker about the Japanese director Akira Kurosawa. Though it was filmed while Kurosawa was working on Ran, the film focuses more on Kurosawa's remote but polite personality than on the making of the film. The film is sometimes seen as being reflective of Marker's fascination with Japanese culture, which he also drew on for one of his best-known films, Sans Soleil. The film was screened in the Un Certain Regard section at the 1985 Cannes Film Festival.

== Cast ==
- Shigehiko Hasumi as Narration
- Chris Marker as narrator in the French version (voice)
- Akira Kurosawa as Self
- Tatsuya Nakadai as Self
- Ishirō Honda as Self
- Asakazu Nakai as Self
- Takao Saito as Self
- Fumio Yanoguchi as Self
- Takeji Sano as Self (as Takeharu Sano)
- Teruyo Nogami as Self
- Fumisuke Okada as Self (as Fumisake Okada)
- Vittorio Dalle Ore as Self (as Vittorio)
- Tōru Takemitsu as Self
- Masato Hara as Self
- Shinobu Muraki as Self
