= Olympia 52 =

1952 film by Chris Marker

- Movie poster
- Directed by: Chris Marker
- Written by: Chris Marker
- Release date: 1952
- Country: France
- Language: French

Olympia 52 is a 1952 French documentary film about the 1952 Summer Olympics in Helsinki, Finland. Olympia 52 was produced by Peuple et Culture, a nonprofit organization, and it was the first feature-length work directed by the French filmmaker Chris Marker, who also co-wrote the narrative and served as one of the production's four cinematographers.
