= Statues Also Die =

1953 film

- Directed by: Alain Resnais; Chris Marker; Ghislain Cloquet
- Written by: Chris Marker
- Narrated by: Jean Négroni
- Cinematography: Ghislain Cloquet
- Edited by: Alain Resnais
- Music by: Guy Bernard
- Production companies: Présence Africaine; Tadié Cinéma
- Release date: 1953
- Running time: 30 minutes
- Country: France
- Language: French

Statues Also Die (French: Les statues meurent aussi) is a 1953 French essay film directed by Alain Resnais, Chris Marker, and Ghislain Cloquet about historical African art and the effects colonialism has had on how it is perceived. The film won the 1954 Prix Jean Vigo. Because of its criticism of colonialism, the second half of the film was banned in France until the 1960s.

== Synopsis ==
The film exhibits a series of sculptures, masks and other traditional art from Sub-Saharan Africa. The images are frequently set to music and cut to the music's pace. The narrator focuses on the emotional qualities of the objects, and discusses the perception of these works of art, craft, and utility from a historical and contemporary European perspective. Only occasionally does the film provide the geographical origin, time period, or other contextual information about the objects. The idea of a dead statue is explained as a statue which has lost its original significance and become reduced to a museum object, similarly to a dead person who can only be found in history books. Interwoven with the objects are a few scenes of Africans performing traditional music and dances, as well as the death of a disemboweled gorilla.

During the last third of the film, the modern commercialisation of African culture is problematised. The film argues that colonial presence has compelled African art to lose much of its idiosyncratic expression, in order to appeal to Western consumers. A mention is made of how African currencies previously had been replaced by European. In the final segment, the film comments on the position of black Africans themselves in contemporary Europe and North America. Footage is seen from a Harlem Globetrotters basketball show, of the boxer Sugar Ray Robinson, and a jazz drummer intercut with scenes from a confrontation between police and labour demonstrators. Lastly the narrator argues that we should regard African and European art history as one inseparable human culture.

== Analysis ==
In her 2006 book Chris Marker, film studies professor Nora M. Alter connects the ambition of the film to Chris Marker's tendency to promote upcoming or obscure artists, in attempts to avoid that their works are overlooked or forgotten. She notes how the objects in Statues Also Die are shown almost as if they were alive: "Marker's camera treats all subjects in front of its lens without differentiating between humans, statues, animals, landscapes, architecture, or signs. The magic of cinema both imbues inanimate objects with life and carries out the mortification of living subjects," something she also connects to the footage of the dying gorilla. Alter further writes that as the film asserts that colonialism is responsible for the "disenchantment and demystification" of African culture, Statues Also Die "illustrates the process whereby a religious fetish is transformed into a commodity fetish by Western civilization."

== Production ==
The film was commissioned from Marker by the association Présence Africaine in 1950, as Alain Resnais said in an interview in 1996. Marker, who knew Resnais, offered to make the film together, because it would be more "fun and enjoyable". Both embarked on the adventure of the chief operator Ghislain Cloquet. According to Resnais, the original intent was not to make an anticolonial film, but only a film about African art. However, when the filmmakers started to do research, they were struck by the fact that African art was exhibited at the ethnological Musée de l'Homme, and not the Louvre like art from elsewhere. As research continued, the disintegrating effects of colonialism became more prominent in the filmmakers' approach to the subject.

== Release ==
The film first premiered in 1953. In 1954 it received the Prix Jean Vigo. Because of the sensitive subject, the sharp criticism of colonialism urged the French National Center of Cinematography to censor the second half of the film until 1963. The first time the full version was publicly screened in France was in November 1968, as part of a program with thematically related short films, under the label "Cinéma d'inquiétude". It premiered on DVD in 2004. The filmmaker Nana Oforiatta Ayim worked on a new translation of the film with Chris Marker in 2005.

== See also ==
- 1953 in film
- Cinema of Africa
- Cinema of France
- French colonial empire
- French New Wave § Left Bank
- List of avant-garde films of the 1950s
