= Le Volcan interdit =

1966 film

- Directed by: Haroun Tazieff
- Written by: Chris Marker
- Cinematography: Chris Marker
- Release date: 1966
- Running time: 80 minutes
- Country: France
- Language: French

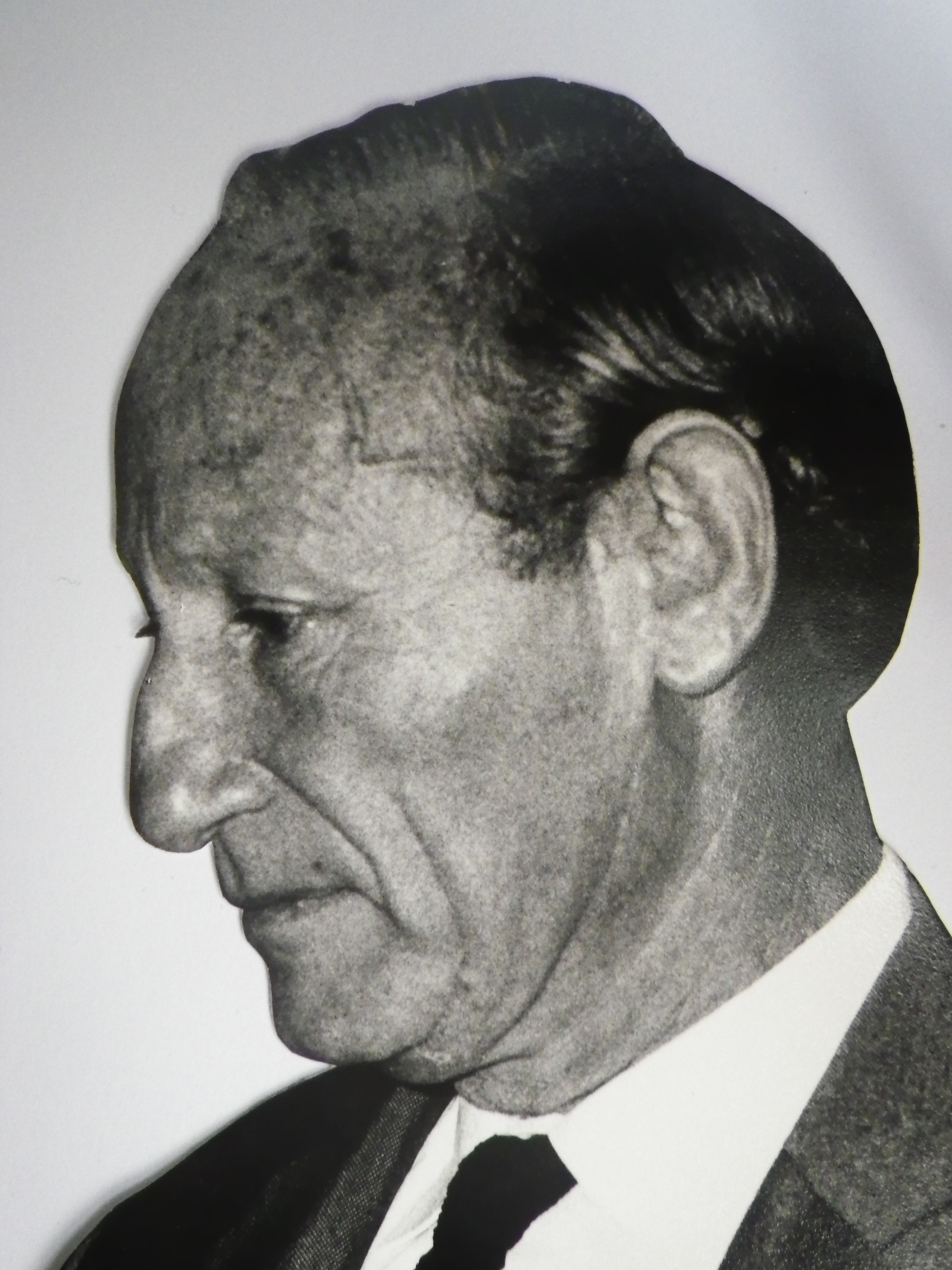
Haroun Tazieff, author of Le Volcan interdit

Le Volcan interdit is a 1966 French documentary film directed by Haroun Tazieff. It was nominated for an Academy Award for Best Documentary Feature. The film is set in Zaire, following an expedition exploring the crater of the Niragongo volcano of the Virunga chain, whose eruptions are known for their violence and their massive lava flows.
