= Description d'un combat =

1960 French documentary by Chris Marker

Third Side of the Coin
- Directed by: Chris Marker
- Written by: Chris Marker
- Produced by: André Valio-Cavaglione; Lia van Leer; Wim Van Leer
- Narrated by: Jean Vilar (French version); Yaakov Malkin (Hebrew version); Howard Vernon (German version)
- Cinematography: Ghislain Cloquet
- Edited by: Eva Zora
- Release date: 1960
- Running time: 57 minutes
- Country: Israel
- Languages: Hebrew, French, English, German

Third Side of the Coin (French: "Description d'un Combat") is a 1960 French documentary film directed by Chris Marker focused on Israeli society in the late 1950s, about 12 years after the state's founding. The film won the Golden Bear at the 11th Berlin International Film Festival in 1961.

The film documents everyday life, from kibbutz socialism to bustling city streets, as well as reflecting on social inequality, ethnic tensions, and the ongoing Arab–Israeli conflict.

In 2025, more than one thousand photographs taken by Marker during filming were found by Israel Museum staff at the Cinémathèque Française in Paris. The Israel Museum staff turned the photographs into an exhibit, titled "Chris Marker: The Lost Photographs of Israel."

Marker himself tried to hinder screenings and distribution of the film, for reasons that later commentators assumed were not only artistic but political, the director feeling, according to them, that the evolution of the country was far from being what he had expected.
