= Immemory =

1997 video game

- Developer: Chris Marker
- Publisher: Exact Change
- Producer: Centre Pompidou
- Platforms: Windows, Macintosh
- Release: 1997
- Genre: Art game
- Mode: Single-player

Immemory is a 1997 CD-ROM by French multimedia artist Chris Marker and published by Exact Change. An art game published in collaboration with the Centre Pompidou, the game is an interactive vignette of multimedia and writing around themes relating to art and history. Following the death of Marker in 2012, the game was republished in paperback print form as Immemory: Gutenberg Version in 2025. Upon re-release, retrospective reception of the game was positive, with critics praising its breadth of subject matter, open-ended nature and evocation of memories, whilst also expressing mixed views on whether it was better suited to a print or digital medium.

== Gameplay ==
Players explore eight interactive areas named 'zones' based on various themes, including 'Cinema', 'War', 'Photography', 'Poetry', 'Travel', 'Museum', and 'Xplugs', with the last being a fusion of art with images from popular culture. Each zone in the game provides players with exposure to photographs, illustrations, paintings, video clips, letters, prose and poetry from eclectic sources across the world. Navigation consists of using the mouse to click hyperlinks to progress; when the cursor changes color or shape, it signals a new page the player can progress to. Hovering the cursor across elements on the screen can also reveal additional text or links. An index provides a list of names of public figures, such as celebrities, artists and writers featured throughout the software.

== Development ==
Immemory was created by Chris Marker, a French filmmaker, writer and multimedia artist, in collaboration with the Centre Pompidou. Marker coded Immemory in 1997 on an Apple IIGS using the software HyperStudio. An English version of the game was published by Exact Change, the company of publishers and artists Damon Krukowski and Naomi Yang, who Marker approached in 1999. It was the first software release by the publisher.

The English-language version of the disc was distributed in 2002, and a remastered version was republished by Exact Change in 2008. From 2011 to the discontinuation of Flash in 2020, the game was playable on Marker's website Gorgomancy. In 2022, the Centre Pompidou also recreated a version of Marker's website and the game in HTML.

In 2005, Marker envisioned a print version of Immemory named the Gutenberg Version, and began a manuscript that was put on hold following his death in 2012. The manuscript was published in paperback under the title Immemory: Gutenberg Version by Exact Change in 2025. The print version of Immemory reproduces screenshots of the software and accompany text, with sections featuring numbers highlighted in blue to suggest destinations like a hyperlink.

== Reception ==
Several critics praised Immemory for its breadth of content, with Nolan Kelly of the The Brooklyn Rail praising its exploratory nature as a "captivating submersion into memory's chasms", and Michael Wood of Artforum writing "it's absurd to try to list, or even summarize, the profusion on this disc". Isabel Ochoa Gold of Criterion.com found the experience of navigating to be both disorienting and exhilirating, stating that the "associations from zone to zone only unfurls more branches and surprises for the intrepid explorer to follow". Kent Jones of Film Comment wrote that Immemory transcended the banal aspects of the medium through an inviting design and a non-linear structure that was evocative of consciousness and memory.

Reviewing the Gutenberg version, Emile Bickerton of Apollo commended the attempts to recreate the organisation and exploration of the software version, but found "flicking back and forth between pages becomes tiresome in a way clicking on an icon is not". Feeling that Immemory "probably should've been a book to begin with", Mike Mosher of Leonardo highlighted its "arresting images" and "interesting collages", but stated some inclusions of media could at times "lose the thread of coherent narrative" posed by individual sections.
