= Yves Montand =

French-Italian actor and singer (1921–1991)

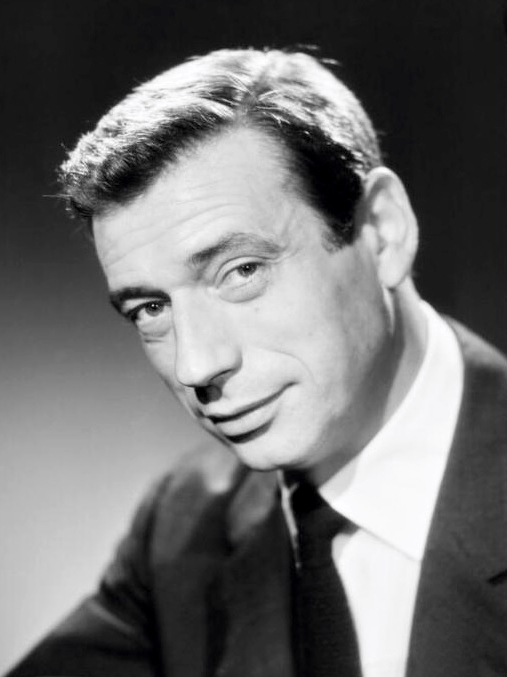
- Montand in 1958
- Born: Ivo Livi; 14 October 1921; Monsummano Terme, Kingdom of Italy
- Died: 9 November 1991 (aged 70); Senlis, France
- Occupations: Actor, singer
- Years active: 1946–1991
- Spouse: Simone Signoret (m. 1951; died 1985)
- Partner: Carole Amiel (1987–1991)
- Children: 1
- Relatives: Jean-Louis Livi (nephew)

Ivo Livi (Italian: [ˈiːvo ˈliːvi]; 13 October 1921 – 9 November 1991), better known as Yves Montand (French: [iv mɔ̃tɑ̃]), was an Italian-born French actor and singer. Montand has been described as one of France's greatest 20th-century artists.

== Early life ==
Montand was born Ivo Livi in Stignano, a small village in the hills of Monsummano Terme, Tuscany, Italy, to Giovanni Livi, a broom manufacturer. Montand's mother Giuseppina Simoni was a devout Catholic. The family left Italy for France in 1923 following fascist Benito Mussolini's rise to power. He grew up in Marseille, where, as a young man, he worked in his sister's beauty salon (Salon de Coiffure), as well as later on the docks. He began a career in show business as a music-hall singer. In 1944, he was discovered by Édith Piaf in Paris; she made him part of her act.

== Career ==
Montand achieved international recognition as a singer and actor, starring in many films. He is recognised for crooner style songs, with those about Paris becoming instant classics. He was one of the best known performers at Bruno Coquatrix's Paris Olympia music hall, and toured with musicians including Didi Duprat. In October 1947, he sang "Mais qu'est-ce que j'ai ?" (music by Henri Betti and lyrics by Édith Piaf) at the Théâtre de l'Étoile. Betti also asked him to sing "C'est si bon" but Montand refused. Following the success of the recording of this song by the Sœurs Étienne in 1948, he decided to record it. Montand was also very popular in the Soviet Union and Eastern Europe, where he did a concert tour in 1956-57.

During his career, Montand acted in American motion pictures as well as on Broadway. He was nominated for a César Award for Best Actor in 1980 for I comme Icare and again in 1984 for Garçon! In 1986, after his international box-office draw power had fallen off considerably, the 65-year-old Montand gave one of his best remembered performances, as the scheming uncle in Jean de Florette, co-starring Gérard Depardieu, and Manon des Sources (both 1986), co-starring Emmanuelle Béart. The film was a worldwide critical hit and revived Montand's profile in the United States, where he made an appearance on Late Night with David Letterman.

== Personal life ==
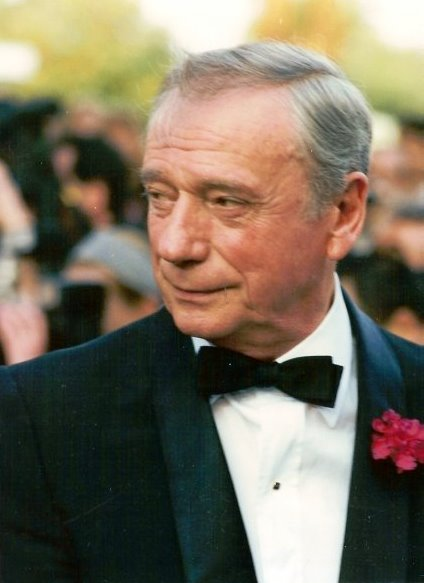
Montand at the 1987 Cannes Film Festival

In 1951, he married Simone Signoret, and they co-starred in several films throughout their careers. The marriage was, by all accounts, fairly harmonious, lasting until her death in 1985, although Montand had a number of well-publicised affairs, notably with American actress Marilyn Monroe, with whom he starred in one of her final films, Let's Make Love. He was the stepfather to Catherine Allégret, Signoret's daughter from her previous marriage to director Yves Allégret.

Montand's only child, a son named Valentine by his second wife, Carole Amiel (b. 1960), was born in 1988. In a paternity suit that caused commotion across France, another woman accused Montand of being the father of her daughter and went to court to obtain a DNA sample from him. Montand refused, but the woman persisted even after his death. In a court ruling that made international headlines, the woman won the right to have Montand exhumed and a sample taken. The results indicated that he was not the girl's biological father.

He supported left-wing causes during the 1950s and 1960s, and attended Communist festivals and meetings. By the mid-1980s his views had shifted to the right, and he became a spokesman for many rightist causes.

Signoret and Montand had a home in Autheuil-Authouillet, Normandy, where the main village street is named after him.

In his later years, he maintained a home in Saint-Paul-de-Vence, Provence, until his death from a heart attack in November 1991. In an interview, Jean-Jacques Beineix said, "[H]e died on the set [of IP5: The Island of Pachyderms]... On the very last day, after his very last shot. It was the very last night and we were doing retakes. He finished what he was doing and then he just died. And the film tells the story of an old man who dies from a heart attack, which is the same thing that happened!" Montand is interred next to his first wife, Simone Signoret, in Père Lachaise Cemetery in Paris.

In 2004, Catherine Allégret alleged in her autobiography Un monde a l'envers (A World Upside Down) that she had been sexually abused by her stepfather from the age of five; his behaviour apparently continued for many years and he had a "more than equivocal attitude to her" as she got older. However, she also claimed to have reconciled with him in the latter years of his life.

== Filmography ==
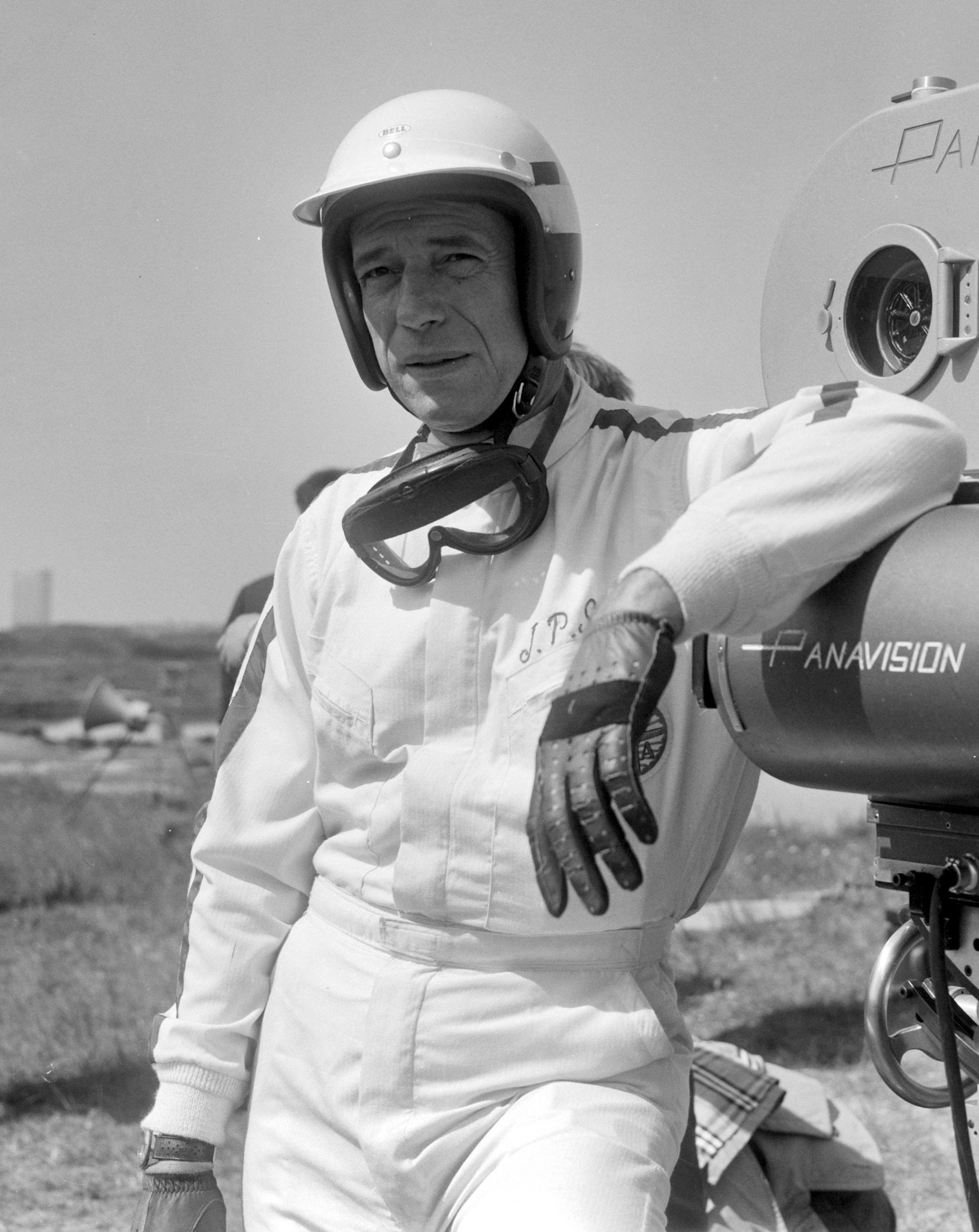
Yves Montand as Formula One driver Jean-Pierre Sarti in Grand Prix, 1966

Year	Title	Role	Director	Notes
1941	La Prière aux étoiles	Un gars dans le café	Marcel Pagnol	Uncredited
1946	Star Without Light	Pierre	Marcel Blistène	
1946	Gates of the Night	Jean Diego	Marcel Carné	
1948	The Idol	Fontana	Alexander Esway	
1950	Lost Souvenirs	Raoul	Christian-Jaque	(segment "Le violon")
1951	The Red Inn	Singing Commentator	Claude Autant-Lara	Voice
1951	Paris Is Always Paris	Himself	Luciano Emmer	cameo appearance
1951	Paris Still Sings	Himself	Pierre Montazel	
1953	Le salaire de la peur (The Wages of Fear)	Mario	Henri-Georges Clouzot	
1953	Saluti e baci	Himself	Maurice Labro and Giorgio Simonelli	Uncredited
1954	Tempi Nostri	Vasco	Alessandro Blasetti and Paul Paviot	
1955	Napoléon	François Joseph Lefebvre	Sacha Guitry	
1955	The Heroes Are Tired	Michel Rivière	Yves Ciampi	
1955	Marguerite de la nuit	Monsieur Léon	Claude Autant-Lara	
1957	The Wolves	Ricuccio	Giuseppe De Santis	
1957	Les Sorcières de Salem	John Proctor	Raymond Rouleau	
1957	La grande strada azzurra	Giovanni Squarciò	Gillo Pontecorvo	
1958	Premier mai	Jean Meunier	Luis Saslavsky	
1959	Legge, La	Matteo Brigante	Jules Dassin	
1960	Let's Make Love	Clement / Dumas	George Cukor	
1961	Sanctuary	Candy Man	Tony Richardson	
1961	Goodbye Again	Roger Demarest	Anatole Litvak	
1962	My Geisha	Paul Robaix	Jack Cardiff	
1963	Le Joli Mai	Narrator	Chris Marker	
1965	Compartiment tueurs	Inspector Grazziani	Costa-Gavras	
1966	La guerre est finie	Diego Mora	Alain Resnais	
1966	Is Paris Burning?	Sgt. Marcel Bizien	René Clément	
1966	Grand Prix	Jean- Pierre Sarti	John Frankenheimer	
1967	Vivre pour vivre	Robert Colomb	Claude Lelouch	
1968	Mr. Freedom	Captain Formidable	William Klein	cameo appearance, Uncredited
1968	Un soir, un train	Mathias	André Delvaux	
1969	The Devil by the Tail	Baron César Maricorne	Philippe de Broca	
1969	Z	Grigoris Lambrakis	Costa-Gavras	
1970	L'Aveu	Gérard	Costa-Gavras	
1970	On a Clear Day You Can See Forever	Marc Chabot	Vincente Minnelli	
1970	Le Cercle Rouge	Jansen	Jean-Pierre Melville	
1971	La folie des grandeurs	Blaze	Gérard Oury	
1972	Tout va bien	"The Director"	Jean-Luc Godard and Jean-Pierre Gorin	
1972	César et Rosalie	César	Claude Sautet	
1972	État de Siège	Philip Michael Santore	Costa-Gavras	
1973	Le Fils	Ange Orahona	Pierre Granier-Deferre	
1974	Chance and Violence	Laurent Bermann	Philippe Labro	
1974	Vincent, François, Paul...et les autres	Vincent	Claude Sautet	
1975	Section spéciale	Un milicien	Costa-Gavras	Uncredited
1975	Le Sauvage	Martin	Jean-Paul Rappeneau	
1976	Police Python 357	Inspecteur Marc Ferrot	Alain Corneau	
1976	Le Grand Escogriffe	Morland	Claude Pinoteau	
1976	A Butterfly in the Night	Himself	Armando Bó	Voice
1977	La Menace	Henri Savin	Alain Corneau	
1977	Le fond de l'air est rouge	Narrator	Chris Marker	
1977	Jacques Prévert	Himself	Jean Desvilles	
1978	Roads to the South	Jean Larrea	Joseph Losey	
1979	Clair de femme	Michel Follin	Costa-Gavras	
1979	I as in Icarus	Henri Volney	Henri Verneuil	
1981	Le Choix des armes	Noël Durieux	Alain Corneau	
1982	Tout feu, tout flamme	Victor Valance	Jean-Paul Rappeneau	
1983	Garçon!	Alex	Claude Sautet	
1986	Jean de Florette	César Soubeyran	Claude Berri	
1986	Manon des Sources	César Soubeyran	Claude Berri	
1988	Trois places pour le 26	Himself	Jacques Demy	
1991	Netchaïev est de retour	Pierre Marroux	Jacques Deray	
1992	IP5: L'île aux pachydermes	Léon Marcel	Jean-Jacques Beineix	(final film role)

== Discography ==
- 1951: Yves Montand Sings (Decca)
- 1952: Chante (Odéon)
- 1953: Chante ses dernières créations (Odéon)
- 1953: Chante Paris (Odéon)
- 1953: Récital au Théâtre de l'Étoile 1953 (Odéon, live)
- 1954: Chante ses derniers succès (Odéon)
- 1954: # 54 (Odéon)
- 1955: Chansons populaires de France (Odéon)
- 1957: 13 ans déjà ! (Odéon)
- 1958: Dix chansons pour l'été (Odéon)
- 1958: Succès du Récital 1958 au Théâtre de L'Étoile (Odéon)
- 1958: Récital 1 + Récital 2 (Philips)
- 1958: Étoile 58 (Philips)
- 1959: One Man Show (Columbia, North America, Philips in UK)
- 1960: Dansez avec Yves Montand (Philips)
- 1961: Rengaine ta rengaine (Philips)
- 1962: Chante Prévert (Philips)
- 1962: Récital 63 – Intégral du Théâtre de l'Étoile (Philips, live)
- 1967: 7 (Philips)
- 1968: La Bicyclette (Philips)
- 1968: Le Paris de... (Philips)
- 1968: À l'Olympia (Philips, live)
- 1970: On a Clear Day You Can See Forever (Columbia, soundtrack with Barbra Streisand)
- 1972: Dans son dernier "One man show" intégral (CBS, live)
- 1974: Montand de mon temps (CBS)
- 1981: D'hier et d'aujourd'hui (Philips)
- 1981: Le disque de la paix (Philips)
- 1982: Olympia 81 (Philips)
- 1983: In English (Philips)
- 1984: Chante David Mc Neil (Philips)
- 1988: Trois places pour le 26 (Philips, w/ Mathilda May, soundtrack)
- 1993: Les années Odéon – 1945–1958 (Columbia, 9-CD boxset)
- 1997: Plaisirs inédits (Universal)
- 2000: Et la fête continue – Intégrale 1945–1949 – Vol. 1 (Frémeaux)
- 2001: Inédits, rares & indispensables (Mercury, 4-CD boxset)
- 2004: Sensationnel – Intégrale 1949–1953 – Vol. 2 (Frémeaux)
- 2007: Une étoile à l'Étoile – Intégrale 1953–1954 – Vol. 3 (Frémeaux, live)
