= A Grin Without a Cat =

- Theatrical release poster
- Directed by: Chris Marker
- Written by: Chris Marker
- Starring: Laurence Cuvillier; Davos Hanich; François Maspero; Yves Montand; François Périer; Sandra Scarnati; Jorge Semprún; Simone Signoret; Paul Vergès
- Edited by: Valérie Mayoux; Christine Aya; Chris Marker; Annie-Claire Mittelberger
- Music by: Luciano Berio
- Production company: Dovidis
- Distributed by: Pari Films
- Release date: 23 November 1977
- Running time: 180 minutes (final version), 240 minutes (first version)
- Country: France
- Language: French

A Grin Without a Cat (French: Le fond de l'air est rouge) is a 1977 French essay film by Chris Marker. It focuses on global political turmoil in the 1960s and '70s, including the rise of the New Left in France and the development of socialist movements in Latin America. Using the image of Lewis Carroll's Cheshire Cat, the film's title evokes a dissonance between the promise of a global socialist revolution (the grin) and its actual nonexistence. The film's original French title means "The essence of the air is red", and has a subtext similar to the English title, implying that the socialist movement existed only in the air.

The title is also a play on words: The original expression in French is "Le fond de l'air est frais", meaning "there is a chill/a nip in the air". Chris Marker replaced the last word, "frais" (fresh), with "rouge" (red), so the original title translates to At the bottom the air is red (communism/socialism).

== Synopsis ==
The film features many interviews with French communist leaders, students, and sociologists. The Prague Spring of 1968 is featured, with footage of a Fidel Castro speech in which he explains his political support for the Soviet invasion of Czechoslovakia while questioning the legality of the action. Other sections deal with the Vietnam War, the guerrilla war in Bolivia, the rise of Salvador Allende, Minamata poisoning in Japan, and the Watergate Scandal in the US. There are many subtle references to cats throughout the film, as well as brief shots of raccoons.

== Release ==
The film was originally released in France on 23 November 1977 with a running time of four hours. It was released with the subtitle "Scènes de la Troisième Guerre mondiale (1967-1977)", which means "Scenes from the Third World War (1967-1977)". It was re-edited by Marker in 1993 and scaled down to two parts of one- hour-and-a-half each, the first titled Fragile Hands and the second titled Severed Hands. The film premiered theatrically in the US in 2002.

=== Critical response ===
J. Hoberman reviewed the film for The Village Voice, and wrote that "Marker begins by evoking Battleship Potemkin, and although hardly agitprop, A Grin Without a Cat is in that tradition—a montage film with a mass hero. Unlike Eisenstein, however, Marker isn't out to invent historical truth so much as to look for it." The critic wrote that the film "reaches its emotional peak with the hopeful New Left demonstrations that swept Europe in 1967. ... But as felt in the tempo of the filmmaking, the tide turns in May 1968: A long, less than exciting section on the various strikes and committees of '68 culminates with the pointless attack on the annual theater festival in Avignon." Hoberman complimented Marker's "genius for poetic aphorism", and concluded, "More impressionistic than analytical, A Grin Without a Cat is a grand immersion. Is it a tract without a thesis?" In Cineaste, David Sterritt described Marker as a "committed Marxist and ... a sophisticated skeptic" while characterizing A Grin Without a Cat as "a film without a dogma". Sterritt wrote: "In sum, A Grin Without a Cat is not a lesson in history but a lesson in how history is dismembered and remembered by every generation in its own faulty way. The film is like a dream gradually coming into focus, or rather, a dream having its last bursts of energy as it gives way to newer but equally skewed patterns of cognition, imagination, and wishful fantasy."

On the review aggregator website Rotten Tomatoes, 92% of 24 critics' reviews are positive. The website's consensus reads: "Grin Without a Cat is a 4-hour mash-up doc on civil disobedience and revolution that collides together with the same power of its recorded subjects." Metacritic, which uses a weighted average, assigned the film a score of 81 out of 100, based on 9 critics, indicating "universal acclaim".

== See also ==
- 1977 in film
- Cinema of France
- Essay: Film
- French New Wave: Left Bank
