= Chris Marker =

French filmmaker (1921–2012)

- Born: Christian François Bouche-Villeneuve; 29 July 1921; Neuilly-sur-Seine, France
- Died: 29 July 2012 (aged 91); Paris, France
- Occupations: Film director; photographer; journalist; multimedia artist

Chris Marker (French: [maʁkɛʁ]; born Christian-François Bouche-Villeneuve; 29 July 1921 – 29 July 2012) was a French writer, photographer, documentary film director, multimedia artist and film essayist. His best known films are La Jetée (1962), A Grin Without a Cat (1977) and Sans Soleil (1983). Marker is usually associated with the Left Bank subset of the French New Wave that occurred in the late 1950s and 1960s, and included such other filmmakers as Alain Resnais, Agnès Varda and Jacques Demy.

His friend and sometime collaborator Alain Resnais called him "the prototype of the twenty-first-century man." Film theorist Roy Armes has said of him: "Marker is unclassifiable because he is unique... French Cinema has its dramatists and its poets, its technicians, and its autobiographers, but only has one true essayist: Chris Marker."

== Early life ==
Marker was born Christian François Bouche-Villeneuve. He was always elusive about his past and known to refuse interviews and not allow photographs to be taken of him; his place of birth is highly disputed. Some sources and Marker himself claim that he was born in Ulaanbaatar, Mongolia. Other sources say he was born in Belleville, Paris, and others, in Neuilly-sur-Seine. The 1949 edition of Le Cœur Net gives his birthday as 22 July. Film critic David Thomson has said, "Marker told me himself that Mongolia is correct. I have since concluded that Belleville is correct—but that does not spoil the spiritual truth of Ulan Bator." When asked about his secretive nature, Marker said, "My films are enough for them [the audience]."

Marker was a philosophy student in France before World War II. During the German occupation of France, he joined the Maquis (FTP), a part of the French Resistance. At some point during the war he left France and joined the United States Air Force as a paratrooper, although some sources claim that this is not true. After the war, he began a career as a journalist, first writing for the journal Esprit, a neo-Catholic, Marxist magazine where he met fellow journalist André Bazin. For Esprit, Marker wrote political commentaries, poems, short stories, and film reviews.

During this period, Marker began to travel around the world as a journalist and photographer, a vocation he pursued for the rest of his life. The French publishing company Éditions du Seuil hired him as editor of the series Petite Planète ("Small World"). That collection devoted one edition to each country and included information and photographs, and would later be published in English translation by Studio Vista and The Viking Press. In 1949 Marker published his first novel, Le Coeur net (The Forthright Spirit), which was about aviation. In 1952 Marker published an illustrated essay on French writer Jean Giraudoux, Giraudoux Par Lui-Même.

== Early career (1950–1961) ==
During his early journalism career, Marker became increasingly interested in filmmaking and in the early 1950s experimented with photography. Around this time Marker met and befriended many members of the Left Bank Film Movement, including Alain Resnais, Agnès Varda, Henri Colpi, Armand Gatti, and the novelists Marguerite Duras and Jean Cayrol. This group is often associated with the French New Wave directors who came to prominence during the same time period, and the groups were often friends and journalistic co-workers. The term Left Bank was first coined by film critic Richard Roud, who described them as having "fondness for a kind of Bohemian life and an impatience with the conformity of the Right Bank, a high degree of involvement in literature and the plastic arts, and a consequent interest in experimental filmmaking", as well as an identification with the political left. Anatole Dauman produced many of Marker's earliest films.

In 1952 Marker made his first film, Olympia 52, a 16mm feature documentary about the 1952 Helsinki Olympic Games. In 1953 he collaborated with Resnais on the documentary Statues Also Die. The film examines traditional African art such as sculptures and masks, and its decline with the coming of Western colonialism. It won the 1954 Prix Jean Vigo, but was banned by French censors for its criticism of French colonialism.

After working as assistant director on Resnais's Night and Fog in 1955, Marker made Sunday in Peking, a short documentary "film essay" in the style that characterized Marker's output for most of his career. Marker shot the film in two weeks while traveling through China with Armand Gatti in September 1955. In the film, Marker's commentary overlaps scenes from China, such as tombs that, contrary to Westernized understandings of Chinese legends, do not contain the remains of Ming dynasty emperors.

After working on the commentary for Resnais's film Le mystère de l'atelier quinze in 1957, Marker continued to refine his style with the feature documentary Letter from Siberia. An essay film on the narrativization of Siberia, it contains Marker's signature commentary, which takes the form of a letter from the director, in the long tradition of epistolary treatments by French explorers of the "undeveloped" world. Letter looks at Siberia's movement into the 20th century and at some of the tribal cultural practices receding into the past. It combines footage Marker shot in Siberia with old newsreel footage, cartoon sequences, stills, and even an illustration of Alfred E. Neuman from Mad Magazine as well as a fake TV commercial as part of a humorous attack on Western mass culture. In producing a meta-commentary on narrativity and film, Marker uses the same brief filmic sequence three times but with different commentary—the first praising the Soviet Union, the second denouncing it, and the third taking an apparently neutral or "objective" stance.

In 1959 Marker made the animated film Les Astronautes with Walerian Borowczyk. The film was a combination of traditional drawings with still photography. In 1960 he made Description d'un combat, (Description of a Struggle) a documentary on the State of Israel that reflects on its past and future. The film won the Golden Bear for Best Documentary at the 1961 Berlin Film Festival.

In January 1961, Marker travelled to Cuba and shot the film ¡Cuba Sí! The film promotes and defends Fidel Castro and includes two interviews with him. It ends with an anti-American epilogue in which the United States is embarrassed by the Bay of Pigs Invasion fiasco, and was subsequently banned. The banned essay was included in Marker's first volume of collected film commentaries, Commentaires I, published in 1961. The following year Marker published Coréennes, a collection of photographs and essays on conditions in Korea.

== La Jetée and Le Joli Mai (1962–1966) ==
Marker became known internationally for the short film La Jetée (The Pier) in 1962. It tells of a post-nuclear war experiment in time travel by using a series of filmed photographs developed as a photomontage of varying pace, with limited narration and sound effects. In the film, a survivor of a futuristic third World War is obsessed with distant and disconnected memories of a pier at the Orly Airport, the image of a mysterious woman, and a man's death. Scientists experimenting in time travel choose him for their studies, and the man travels back in time to contact the mysterious woman, and discovers that the man's death at the Orly Airport was his own. Except for one shot of the woman mentioned above sleeping and suddenly waking up, the film is composed entirely of photographs by Jean Chiabaud and stars Davos Hanich as the man, Hélène Châtelain as the woman and photographer-film director William Klein as a man from the future.

While making La Jetée, Marker was simultaneously making the 150-minute documentary essay-film Le joli mai, released in 1963. Beginning in the spring of 1962, Marker and his camera operator Pierre Lhomme shot 55 hours of footage interviewing random people on the streets of Paris. The questions, asked by the unseen Marker, range from their personal lives, as well as social and political issues of relevance at that time. As he had with montages of landscapes and indigenous art, Marker created a film essay that contrasted and juxtaposed a variety of lives with his signature commentary (spoken by Marker's friends, singer-actor Yves Montand in the French version and Simone Signoret in the English version). The film has been compared to the Cinéma vérité films of Jean Rouch, and criticized by its practitioners at the time. The term "Cinéma vérité" was itself anathema to Marker, who never used it. Instead, he preferred his own term "ciné, ma vérité," meaning "cinéma, my truth." It was shown in competition at the 1963 Venice Film Festival, where it won the award for Best First Work. It also won the Golden Dove Award at the Leipzig DOK Festival.

After the documentary Le Mystère Koumiko in 1965, Marker made Si j'avais quatre dromadaires, an essay-film that, like La Jetée, is a photomontage of over 800 photographs Marker had taken over the previous 10 years in 26 countries. The commentary involves a conversation between a fictitious photographer and two friends, who discuss the photos. The film's title is an allusion to a poem by Guillaume Apollinaire. It was the last film in which Marker included "travel footage" for many years.

== SLON and ISKRA (1967–1974) ==
In 1967 Marker published his second volume of collected film essays, Commentaires II. That same year, Marker organized the omnibus film Loin du Vietnam, a protest against the Vietnam War with segments contributed by Marker, Jean-Luc Godard, Alain Resnais, Agnès Varda, Claude Lelouch, William Klein, Michele Ray and Joris Ivens. The film includes footage of the war, from both sides, as well as anti-war protests in New York and Paris and other anti-war activities.

From this initial collection of filmmakers with left-wing political agendas, Marker created the group S.L.O.N. (Société pour le lancement des oeuvres nouvelles, "Society for launching new works", but also the Russian word for "elephant"). SLON was a film collective whose objectives were to make films and to encourage industrial workers to create film collectives of their own. Its members included Valerie Mayoux, Jean-Claude Lerner, Alain Adair and John Tooker. Marker is usually credited as director or co-director of all of the films made by SLON.

After the events of May 1968, Marker felt a moral obligation to abandon his own personal film career and devote himself to SLON and its activities. SLON's first film was about a strike at a Rhodiacéta factory in France, À bientôt, j'espère (Rhodiacéta) in 1968. Later that year SLON made La Sixième face du pentagone, about an anti-war protest in Washington, D.C., and was a reaction to what SLON considered to be the unfair and censored reportage of such events on mainstream television. The film was shot by François Reichenbach, who received co-director credit. La Bataille des dix millions was made in 1970 with Mayoux as co-director and Santiago Álvarez as cameraman and is about the 1970 sugar crop in Cuba and its disastrous effects on the country. In 1971, SLON made Le Train en marche, a new prologue to Soviet filmmaker Aleksandr Medvedkin's 1935 film Schastye, which had recently been re-released in France.

In 1974, SLON became I.S.K.R.A. (Images, Sons, Kinescope, Réalisations, Audiovisuelles, but also the name of Vladimir Lenin's political newspaper Iskra, which also is a Russian word for "spark").

== Return to personal work (1974–1986) ==
In 1974 Marker returned to his personal work and made a film outside of ISKRA. La Solitude du chanteur de fond is a one-hour documentary about Marker's friend Yves Montand's benefit concert for Chilean refugees. The concert was Montand's first public performance in four years, and the documentary includes film clips from his long career as a singer and actor.

Marker had been working on a film about Chile with ISKRA since 1973. Marker had collaborated with Belgian sociologist Armand Mattelart and ISKRA members Valérie Mayoux and Jacqueline Meppiel to shoot and collect the visual materials, which Marker then edited together and provided the commentary for. The resulting film was the two and a half-hour documentary La Spirale, released in 1975. The film chronicles events in Chile, beginning with the 1970 election of socialist President Salvador Allende until his murder and the resulting coup in 1973.

Marker then began work on one of his most ambitious films, A Grin Without a Cat, released in 1977. The film's title refers to the Cheshire Cat from Alice in Wonderland. The metaphor compares the promise of the global socialist movement before May 1968 (the grin) with its actual presence in the world after May 1968 (the cat). The film's original French title is Le fond de l'air est rouge, which means "the air is essentially red", or "revolution is in the air", implying that the socialist movement was everywhere around the world.

The film was intended to be an all-encompassing portrait of political movements since May 1968, a summation of the work which he had taken part in for ten years. The film is divided into two parts: the first half focuses on the hopes and idealism before May 1968, and the second half on the disillusion and disappointments since those events. Marker begins the film with the Odessa Steps sequence from Sergei Eisenstein's film The Battleship Potemkin, which Marker points out is a fictitious creation of Eisenstein which has still influenced the image of the historical event. Marker used very little commentary in this film, but the film's montage structure and preoccupation with memory make it a Marker film. Upon release, the film was criticized for not addressing many current issues of the New Left such as the woman's movement, sexual liberation and worker self-management. The film was re-released in the US in 2002.

In the late 1970s, Marker traveled extensively throughout the world, including an extended period in Japan. From this inspiration, he first published the photo-essay Le Dépays in 1982, and then used the experience for his next film Sans Soleil, released in 1982.

Sans Soleil stretches the limits of what could be called a documentary. It is an essay, a montage, mixing pieces of documentary with fiction and philosophical comments, creating an atmosphere of dream and science fiction. The main themes are Japan, Africa, memory and travel. A sequence in the middle of the film takes place in San Francisco, and heavily references Alfred Hitchcock's Vertigo. Marker has said that Vertigo is the only film "capable of portraying impossible memory, insane memory." The film's commentary are credited to the fictitious cameraman Sandor Krasna, and read in the form of letters by an unnamed woman. Though centered around Japan, the film was also shot in such other countries as Guinea Bissau, Ireland and Iceland. Sans Soleil was shown at the 1983 Berlin Film Festival where it won the OCIC Award. It was also awarded the Sutherland Trophy at the 1983 British Film Institute Awards.

In 1984, Marker was invited by producer Serge Silberman to document the making of Akira Kurosawa's film Ran. From this Marker made A.K., released in 1985. The film focuses more on Kurosawa's remote but polite personality than on the making of the film. The film was screened in the Un Certain Regard section at the 1985 Cannes Film Festival, before Ran itself had been released.

In 1985, Marker's long-time friend and neighbor Simone Signoret died of cancer. Marker then made the one-hour TV documentary Mémoires pour Simone as a tribute to her in 1986.

== Multimedia and later career (1987–2012) ==
Beginning with Sans Soleil, Marker developed a deep interest in digital technology. From 1985 to 1988, he worked on a conversational program (a prototypical chatbot) called "Dialector," which he wrote in Applesoft BASIC on an Apple II. He incorporated audiovisual elements in addition to the snippets of dialogue and poetry that "Computer" exchanged with the user. Version 6 of this program was revived from a floppy disk (with Marker's help and permission) and emulated online in 2015.

His interests in digital technology also led to his film Level Five (1996) and Immemory (1998, 2008), an interactive multimedia CD-ROM, produced for the Centre Pompidou (French language version) and from Exact Change (English version). Marker created a 19-minute multimedia piece in 2005 for the Museum of Modern Art in New York City titled Owls at Noon Prelude: The Hollow Men which was influenced by T. S. Eliot's poem.

Marker lived in Paris, and very rarely granted interviews. One exception was a lengthy interview with Libération in 2003 in which he explained his approach to filmmaking. When asked for a picture of himself, he usually offered a photograph of a cat instead. (Marker was represented in Agnes Varda's 2008 documentary The Beaches of Agnes by a cartoon drawing of a cat, speaking in a technologically altered voice.) Marker's own cat was named Guillaume-en-égypte. In 2009, Marker commissioned an Avatar of Guillaume-en-Egypte to represent him in machinima works. The avatar was created by Exosius Woolley and first appeared in the short film / machinima, Ouvroir the Movie by Chris Marker.

In the 2007 Criterion Collection release of La Jetée and Sans Soleil, Marker included a short essay, "Working on a Shoestring Budget". He confessed to shooting all of Sans Soleil with a silent film camera, and recording all the audio on a primitive audio cassette recorder. Marker also reminds the reader that only one short scene in La Jetée is of a moving image, as Marker could only borrow a movie camera for one afternoon while working on the film.

From 2007 through 2011 Marker collaborated with the art dealer and publisher Peter Blum on a variety of projects that were exhibited at the Peter Blum galleries in New York City's Soho and Chelsea neighborhoods. Marker's works were also exhibited at the Peter Blum Gallery on 57th Street in 2014. These projects include several series of printed photographs titled PASSENGERS, Koreans, Crush Art, Quelle heure est-elle?, and Staring Back; a set of photogravures titled After Dürer; a book, PASSENGERS; and digital prints of movie posters, whose titles were often appropriated, including Breathless, Hiroshima Mon Amour, Owl People, and Rin Tin Tin. The video installations Silent Movie and Owls at Noon Prelude: The Hollow Men were exhibited at Peter Blum in 2009. These works were also exhibited at the 2014 & 2015 Venice Biennale, Whitechapel Gallery in London, the MIT List Visual Arts Center in Cambridge, Massachusetts, the Carpenter Center for the Visual Arts at Harvard University, the Moscow Photobiennale, Les Recontres d'Arles de la Photographie in Arles, France, the Centre de la Photographie in Geneva, Switzerland, the Walker Art Center in Minneapolis, Minnesota, the Wexner Center for the Arts in Columbus, Ohio, The Museum of Modern Art in New York, and the Pacific Film Archive in Berkeley, California. Since 2014 the artworks of the Estate of Chris Marker are represented by Peter Blum Gallery, New York.

Marker died on 29 July 2012, his 91st birthday.

== Legacy ==
La Jetée was the inspiration for Mamoru Oshii's 1987 debut live action feature The Red Spectacles (and later for parts of Oshii's 2001 film Avalon) and also inspired Terry Gilliam's 12 Monkeys (1995), Christopher Nolan's Memento (2000) and Jonás Cuarón's Year of the Nail (2007) as well as many of Mira Nair's shots in her 2006 film The Namesake.

== Works ==
=== Filmography ===
- Olympia 52 (1952)
- Statues Also Die (1953 with Alain Resnais)
- Sunday in Peking (1956)
- Lettre de Sibérie (1957)
- Les Astronautes (1959 with Walerian Borowczyk)
- Description d'un combat (1960)
- ¡Cuba Sí! (1961)
- La Jetée (1962)
- Le Joli Mai (1963, 2006 re-cut)
- Le Mystère Koumiko (1965)
- Si j'avais quatre dromadaires (1966)
- Loin du Vietnam (1967)
- Rhodiacéta (1967)
- La Sixième face du Pentagone (1968)
- Cinétracts (1968)
- À bientôt, j'espère (1968 with Marret)
- On vous parle du Brésil: Tortures (1969)
- Jour de tournage (1969)
- Classe de lutte (1969)
- On vous parle de Paris: Maspero, les mots ont un sens (1970)
- On vous parle du Brésil: Carlos Marighela (1970)
- La Bataille des dix millions (1971)
- Le Train en marche (1971)
- On vous parle de Prague: le deuxième procès d'Artur London (1971)
- Vive la baleine (1972)
- L'Ambassade (1973)
- On vous parle du Chili: ce que disait Allende (1973 with Miguel Littín)
- Puisqu'on vous dit que c'est possible (1974)
- La Solitude du chanteur de fond (1974)
- La Spirale (1975)
- A Grin Without a Cat (1977)
- Quand le siècle a pris formes (1978)
- Junkopia (1981)
- Sans Soleil (1983)
- 2084 (1984)
- From Chris to Christo (1985)
- Matta (1985)
- A.K. (1985)
- Eclats (1986)
- Mémoires pour Simone (1986)
- Tokyo Days (1988)
- Spectre (1988)
- The Owl's Legacy (L'héritage de la chouette) (1989)
- Bestiaire (three short video haiku) (1990)
  - Bestiaire 1. Chat écoutant la musique
  - Bestiaire 2. An owl is An owl is an owl
  - Bestiaire 3. Zoo Piece
- Getting Away with It (1990)
- Berlin 1990 (1990)
- Détour Ceausescu (1991)
- Théorie des ensembles (1991)
- Coin fenêtre (1992)
- Azulmoon (1992)
- Le Tombeau d'Alexandre a.k.a. The Last Bolshevik (1992)
- Le 20 heurs dans les camps (1993)
- Prime Time in the Camps (1993)
- SLON Tango (1993)
- Bullfight in Okinawa (1994)
- Eclipse (1994)
- Haiku (1994)
  - Haiku 1. Petite Ceinture
  - Haiku 2. Chaika
  - Haiku 3. Owl Gets in Your Eyes
- Casque bleu (1995)
- Silent Movie (1995)
- Level Five (1997)
- One Day in the Life of Andrei Arsenevich (2000)
- Un maire au Kosovo (2000)
- Le Facteur sonne toujours cheval (2001)
- Avril inquiet (2001)
- Le Souvenir d'un avenir (with Bellon 2003)
- Chats Perchés (2004) – a documentary about M. Chat street art
- Leila Attacks (2006)
- Stopover in Dubai (2011)

=== Film collaborations ===
- Nuit et Brouillard (Resnais 1955)
  - Note: In a 1995 interview Resnais states that the final version of the commentary was a collaboration between Marker and Jean Cayrol (source: Film Comment).
- Toute la mémoire du monde (Resnais 1956)
  - Note: Credited as "Chris and Magic Marker."
- Les hommes de la baleine (Ruspoli 1956)
  - Note: under the pseudonym "Jacopo Berenizi" Marker wrote the commentary for this short about whale hunters in the Azores. The two would return to this topic in 1972's Vive la Baleine (Film Comment).
- Broadway by Light (Klein 1957)
  - Note: Marker wrote the introductory text to this film.
- Le mystere de l'atelier quinze (Resnais et Heinrich 1957)
  - Note: Marker wrote the commentary for this fictional short (Film Comment).
- Le Siècle a soif (Vogel 1958)
  - Note: Marker wrote and spoke all the commentary for this short film about fruit juice in Alexandrine verse (Film Comment).
- La Mer et les jours (Vogel et Kaminker 1958)
  - Note: Marker present commentary for this "somber work about the daily lives of fishermen on Brittany's Île de Sein" (Film Comment).
- L'Amérique insolite (Reichenbach 1958)
  - Note: Marker was eventually credited as a writer for this one, apparently, he wrote the dialogue (Film Comment).
- Django Reinhardt (Paviot 1959)
  - Note: Marker narrated this one (Film Comment).
- Jouer à Paris (Varlin 1962)
  - Note: This was edited by Marker – essentially, this film is a 27-minute postscript to Le Joli Mai assembled from leftover footage and organized around a new commentary (Film Comment).
- A Valparaiso (Ivens 1963)
  - Note: This gem was written by Marker. It feels like a Marker film.
- Les Chemins de la fortune (Kassovitz 1964)
  - Note: Marker apparently helped edit and organise this Venezuela travelogue (Film Comment).
- La Douceur du village (Reichenbach 1964)
  - Note: Edited by Marker.
- La Brûlure de mille soleils (Kast 1964)
  - Note: Marker edited this (mostly) animated science-fiction existentialist short and (possibly) collaborated on the script (Film Comment).
- Le volcan interdit (Tazieff 1966)
  - Note: Marker narrates this volcano documentary.
- Europort-Rotterdam (Ivens 1966)
  - Note: Marker did the textual adaptation (Film Comment.
- On vous parle de Flins (Devart 1970)
  - Note: Marker helped film and edit this short (Film Comment).
- L'Afrique express (Tessier et Lang 1970)
  - Note: Marker wrote the introductory text for this film under the name "Boris Villeneuve" (Film Comment).
- Congo Oyé (We Have Come Back) (Stephens and Cleaver 1971)
  - Note: Marker edited this film
- Kashima Paradise (Le Masson et Deswarte 1974)
  - Note: Marker collaborated on the commentary on this documentary about the destruction of Kashima and Narita (Film Comment).
- La Batalla de Chile (Guzman, 1975–1976)
  - Note: Marker helped produce and contributed to the screenplay for this, perhaps the greatest of all documentary films (Film Comment).
- One Sister and Many Brothers (Makavejev 1994)
  - Note: Marker tapes Makavejev circulating among the guests of a party in his honor as much jovial backslapping abounds (Film comment).

=== Photographic series ===
- Koreans (1957, printed in 2009)
- Crush Art (2003–2008)
- "Quelle heure est-elle?" (2004–2008)
- PASSENGERS (2008–2010)
- Staring Back (varying years)

=== Digital prints ===
- Breathless (1995, printed 2009)
- Hiroshima Mon Amour (1995, printed 2009)
- Owl People (1995, printed 2009)
- Rin Tin Tin (1995, printed 2009)

=== Photogravures ===
- After Dürer (2005–07, printed in 2009)

=== Video installations ===
- Silent Movie (1995)
- Owls at Noon Prelude: The Hollow Men (2005)

=== Bibliography (self-contained works by Marker) ===
- Le Cœur Net (1949, Editions du Seuil, Paris)
- Giraudoux Par Lui-Même (1952, Editions du Seuil, Paris)
- Commentaires I (1961, Editions du Seuil, Paris)
- Coréennes (1962, Editions du Seuil, Paris)
- Commentaires II (1967, Editions du Seuil, Paris)
- Le Dépays (1982, Editions Herscher, Paris)
- Silent Movie (1995, Ohio State University Press)
- La Jetée ciné-roman (1996 / 2nd printing 2008, MIT Press, Cambridge; designed by Bruce Mau)
- Staring Back (2007, MIT Press, Cambridge)
- Immemory (CDROM) (1997 / 2nd printing 2008, Exact Change, Cambridge)
- Inner Time of Television (2010, The Otolith Group, London)
