= Jean-Paul Rappeneau =

French film director and screenwriter (1932–2026)

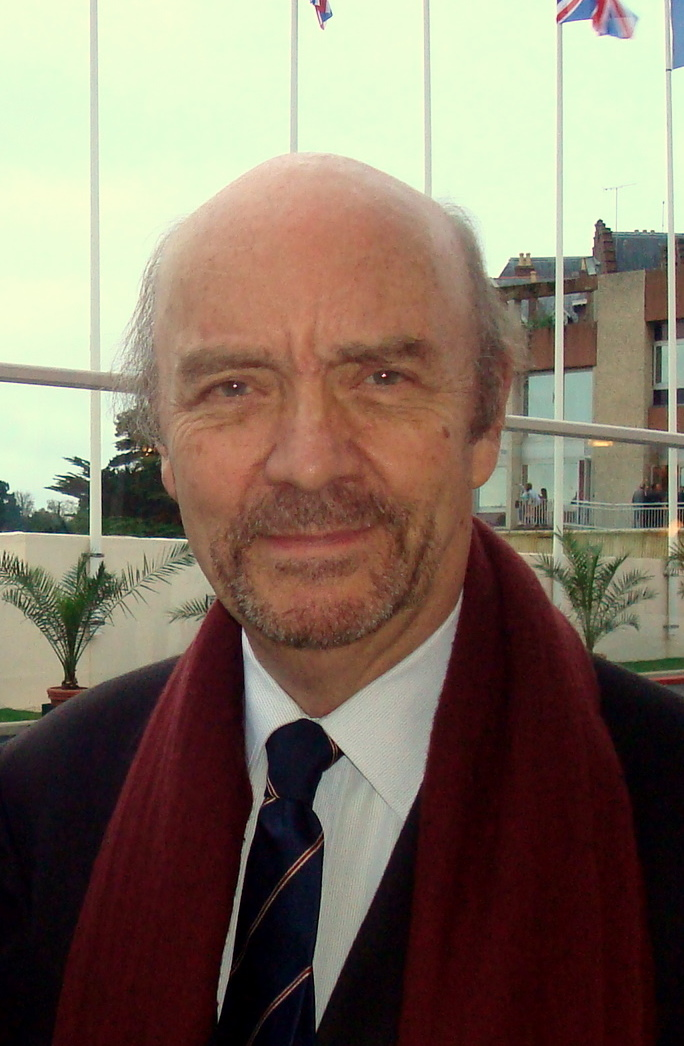
- Rappeneau in 2009
- Born: 8 April 1932; Auxerre, Yonne, France
- Died: 1 September 2026 (aged 94)
- Occupations: Film director, screenwriter
- Years active: 1960–2015

Jean-Paul Rappeneau (French pronunciation: [ʒɑ̃pɔl ʁapno]; 8 April 1932 – 1 September 2026) was a French film director and screenwriter.

== Career ==
Rappeneau started out in film as an assistant and screenwriter collaborating with Louis Malle on Zazie dans le métro in 1960 and Vie privée in 1961. In 1964, he was co-screenwriter for L'Homme de Rio, which starred Jean-Paul Belmondo.

The first film that he both wrote and directed was A Matter of Resistance in 1965. Although it was a great critical and popular success, he did not make another film until 1971, when he directed Les Mariés de l'an II, again starring Belmondo and Marlène Jobert.

From 1975, Rappeneau wrote only for his own films, including Le Sauvage, starring Yves Montand and Tout feu, tout flamme (1981), again with Montand, who co-starred with Isabelle Adjani.

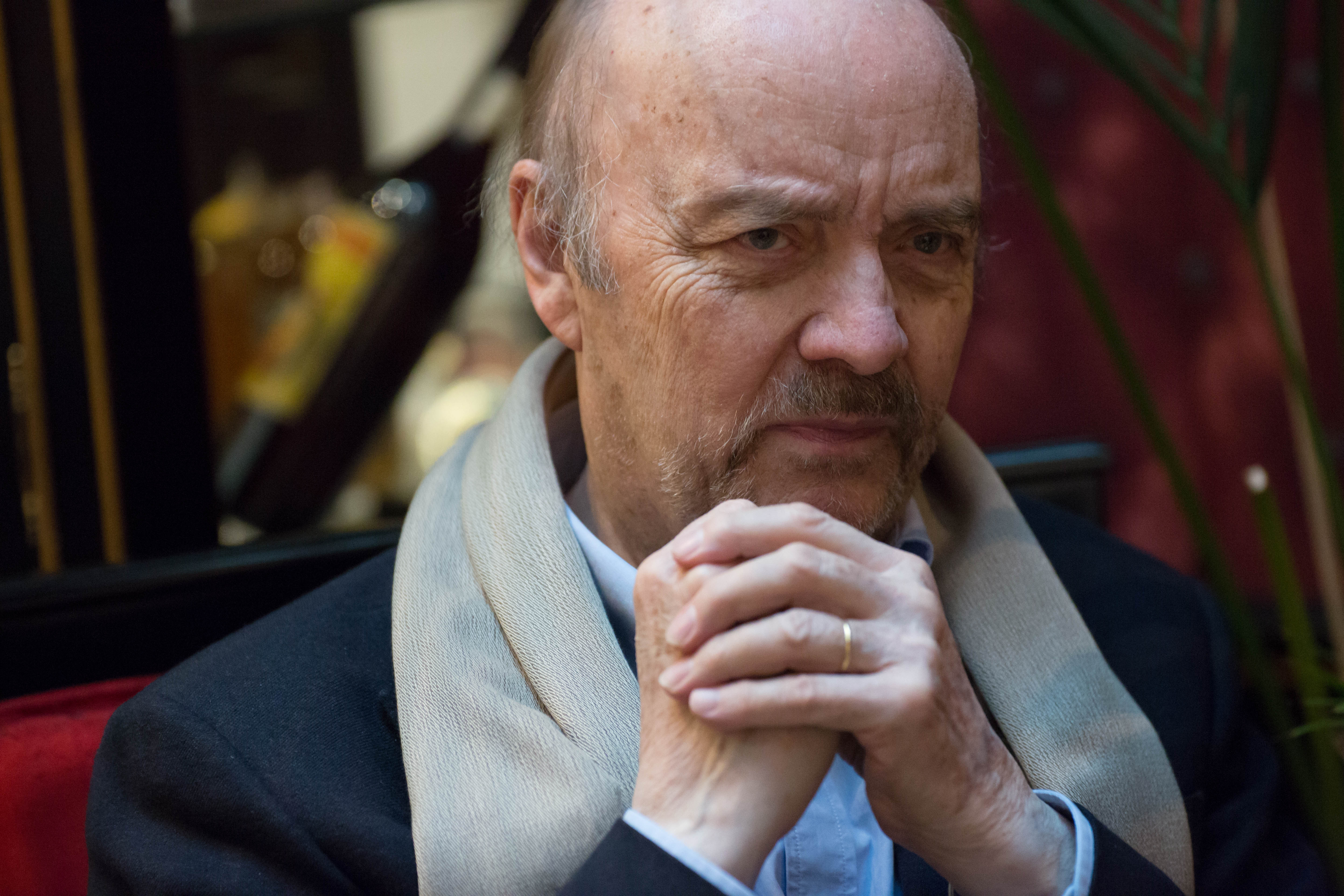
Jean-Paul Rappeneau in Toulouse, during a press conference about his film Families

In 1990, Rappeneau directed a deluxe Technicolor film version of Cyrano de Bergerac, his adaptation of the classic French play by Edmond Rostand, starring Gérard Depardieu. Rappeneau's film version is the most elaborate film version of the play ever made, and one of the most expensive French films ever produced. It is the only rendition of the play in the original French to be released widely. At the 1991 César Awards, Rappeneau won the César Award for Best Director and César Award for Best Film.

The 2003 comedy Bon voyage, co-written with Patrick Modiano, again starred Depardieu, this time with Isabelle Adjani. The film was nominated 11 times at the 2004 César Awards.

== Death ==
Rappeneau died on 1 September 2026, at the age of 94.

== Filmography ==
Year	Title	Credited as		Notes
Year	Title	Director	Screenwriter	Notes
1958	Chronique provinciale	Yes		Short film
1959	Signé Arsène Lupin		Yes	
1960	Zazie dans le Métro		Yes	
1962	A Very Private Affair		Yes	
1962	Le Combat dans l'île		Yes	
1964	That Man from Rio		Yes	Nominated—Academy Award for Best Original Screenplay
1965	Marco the Magnificent		Yes	
1965	Les Survivants		Yes	TV series
1966	A Matter of Resistance	Yes	Yes	Louis Delluc Prize
1971	The Married Couple of the Year Two	Yes	Yes	Nominated—Palme d'Or (1971 Cannes Film Festival)
1971	Le Magnifique		Yes	
1975	Lovers Like Us	Yes	Yes	Nominated—César Award for Best Director
1982	All Fired Up	Yes	Yes	
1990	Cyrano de Bergerac	Yes	Yes	César Award for Best Film; César Award for Best Director; David di Donatello for Best Foreign Film; Golden Globe Award for Best Foreign Language Film; London Film Critics' Circle Award for Foreign Language Film of the Year; National Board of Review Award for Best Foreign Language Film; People's Choice Award (1990 Toronto International Film Festival); Nominated—BAFTA Award for Best Film Not in the English Language; Nominated—BAFTA Award for Best Adapted Screenplay; Nominated—César Award for Best Original Screenplay or Adaptation; Nominated—European Film Award for Best Film; Nominated—Palme d'Or (1990 Cannes Film Festival)
1995	The Horseman on the Roof	Yes	Yes	Nominated—César Award for Best Film; Nominated—César Award for Best Director
2003	Bon Voyage	Yes	Yes	Swann d'Or for Best Director; Nominated—César Award for Best Film; Nominated—César Award for Best Director; Nominated—César Award for Best Original Screenplay or Adaptation
2015	Families	Yes	Yes	
