= Amédée-François-Régis de Pérusse des Cars =

- Duke of Cars
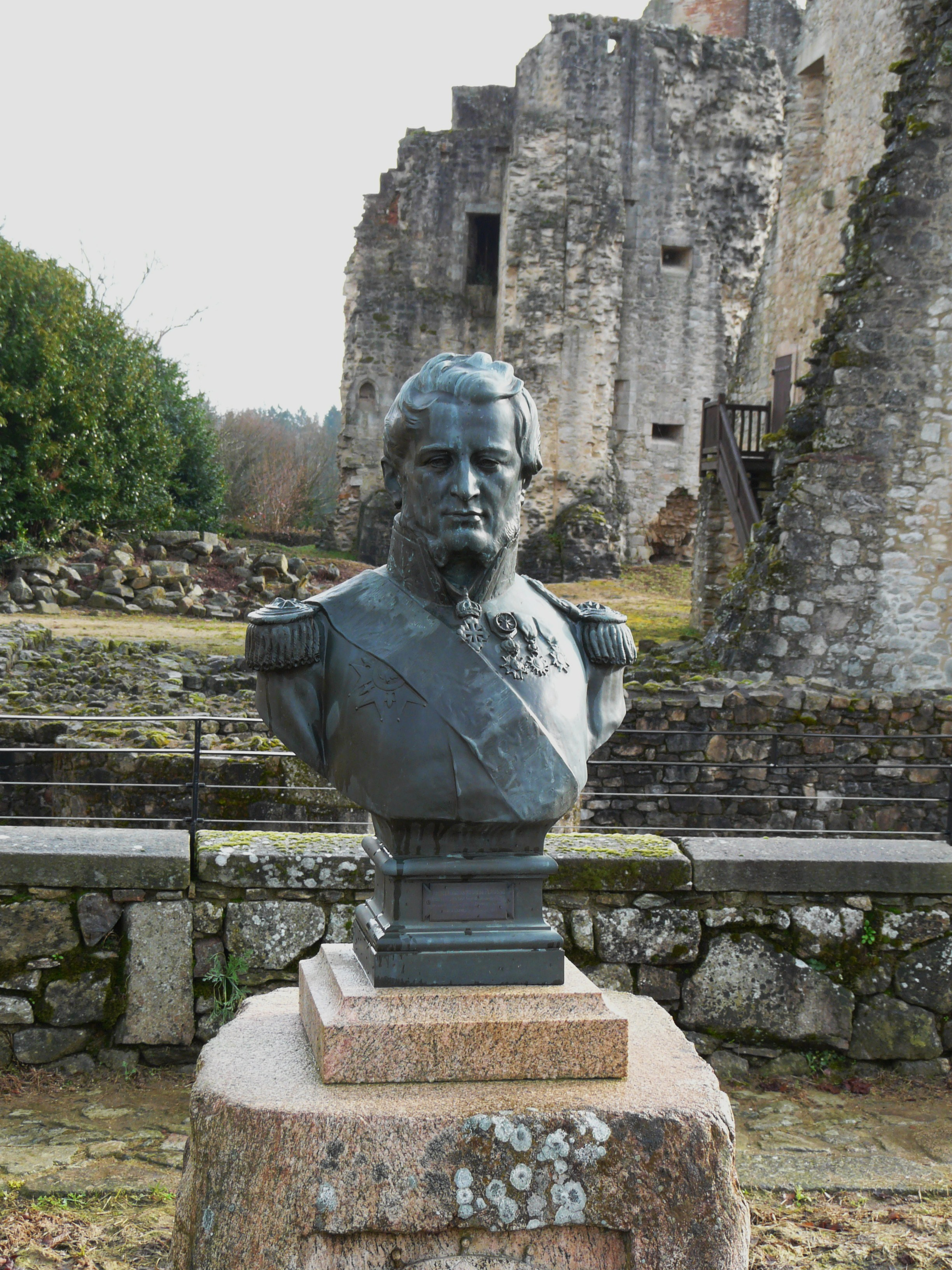
- Born: 30 December 1790; Chambéry, Savoie, France
- Died: 19 January 1868 (aged 77); Cannes, France
- Spouse: Augustine du Bouchet de Sourches de Tourzel (m. 1817)
- Issue: François-Joseph de Pérusse des Cars; Amédée de Pérusse des Cars; Vicomte Jean Baptiste de Pérusse des Cars; Marie de Pérusse Des Cars; Henriette de Pérusse des Cars; Geneviève de Pérusse des Cars
- Father: François-Nicolas-René de Pérusse des Cars
- Mother: Etienette Charlotte Dorothée Emilie de Ligny

Amédée-François-Régis de Pérusse des Cars, Duke of Cars (30 December 1790 – 19 January 1868), was a French nobleman and soldier.

== Early life ==
Amédée-François-Régis de Pérusse des Cars was born at Chambéry, Savoie, France on 30 December 1790. He was a son of François-Nicolas-René de Pérusse des Cars, Comte des Cars, and Etienette Charlotte Dorothée Emilie de Ligny.

His paternal grandparents were Jeanne Marie Victoire d'Artaguiette de la Huette de Carvoisin and Louis-Nicolas de Pérusse des Cars, Marquis des Cars (a son of Louis François de Pérusse des Cars, Comte des Cars and Marquis de Pranzac, and the former Marie-Françoise-Victoire de Verthamon). His maternal grandparents were Adrien Charles de Ligny and Élisabeth Jeanne de La Roche.

== Career ==
Following the French Revolution and the destruction of the family château, the family went into exile in England. Des Cars was commissioned as an officer in the British 7th Light Dragoons (Hussars) and served with this regiment during the Peninsular War (1809–1814). He participated in the retreat to La Coruña (1808–09) and the battle fought there on January 16, 1809. After a period in Ireland (1810–1812), the regiment returned to Spain and fought through the Pyrenees and southern France. Des Cars participated with the 7th Hussars in the Battle of Orthes and the attack on Toulouse. In 1847, he applied for and received the Military General Service Medal, with clasps: Corunna, Orthes and Toulouse. He resigned his position as lieutenant in the 7th Hussars at the (apparent) end of the war in 1814 and returned to France.

A member of the French army known as the Hundred Thousand Sons of Saint Louis, he participated in the 1823 expedition mobilized by the Bourbon King of France, Louis XVIII, to help the Spanish Royalists restore King Ferdinand VII of Spain to the absolute power of which he had been deprived during the Liberal Triennium. The Duke also commanded the 3rd division during the French conquest of Algeria in June 1830.

Upon the death of Jean-François de Pérusse des Cars, the 1st Duke of Cars, at Tuileries Palace on 10 November 1822 without male issue, the dukedom became extinct. (Note: Jean-François de Pérusse des Cars, 1st Duke of Cars, was a first cousin of Amédée's father, both being grandsons of Louis François de Pérusse des Cars, Comte des Cars and Marquis de Pranzac.) However, the title was renewed on 30 May 1825 for Amédée. Since its renewal, the title has been inherited by a son of the preceding Duke and remains extant to this day.

In 1828, he bought the Château de La Roche-de-Bran in Montamisé, Vienne. The Château was destroyed by fire by the Nazis in 1944 during World War II.

== Personal life ==
On 25 June 1817, Pérusse des Cars was married to Augustine du Bouchet de Sourches de Tourzel (1798–1870) at the Château d'Abondant. She was a daughter of Charles Louis du Bouchet de Sourches de Tourzel and Augustine Eléonore de Pons. Together, they were the parents of:

- François-Joseph de Pérusse des Cars (1819–1891), a historian who edited the memoirs of his grandmother, the Duchess of Tourzel, and the memoirs of the 1st Duke of Cars; he married Marie Elizabeth de Bastard d'Estang (1824–1886).
- Amédée Joseph de Pérusse des Cars (1820–1899), Comte des Cars who married Mathilde Louise Camille de Cossé-Brissac, a daughter of Arthus Gabriel Timoléon de Cossé-Brissac, nephew of the 8th Duke of Brissac.
- Jean Baptiste Augustin de Pérusse des Cars (1821–1860), Vicomte des Cars who married Alexandrine Jeanne Sophie Thérèse von Lebzeltern, a daughter of Count Ludwig Joseph von Lebzeltern.
- Marie-Paule de Pérusse Des Cars (1827–1855), who married Louis de Blacas d'Aulps, 2nd Duke of Blacas, 2nd Prince of Blacas, son of the 1st Duke of Blacas and a godson of King Louis XVIII.
- Henriette de Pérusse des Cars (1833–1911), who married Charles Henri MacMahon, 4th Marquis de MacMahon.
- Geneviève Pauline de Pérusse des Cars (1836–1886), who married Riccardo Manca-Amat, Duke of Vallombrosa and Asinara.

The Duke of Cars died in Cannes on 19 January 1868. He was succeeded in the dukedom by his son, François.

=== Descendants ===
Through his eldest son and heir François, he was a grandfather of Louis-Albert-Auguste-Philibert de Pérusse des Cars, who married Thérese Anne-Marie Lafond, a daughter of Étienne Edmond Lafond, Count Lafond.

Through his second son Amédée, he was a grandfather of Hélène Aldégonde Marie de Pérusse des Cars (1847-1933) , who married Henry Noailles Widdrington Standish (1847-1920), the last member of his family to have been lord of the manor of Standish, Lancashire, a title they held since the 13th century. Hélène Standish became a well-known member of Paris high society, hosting a celebrated literary and artistic salon. Through the same son, Amédée-François-Régis de Pérusse des Cars was also a grandfather to Emilie Gabrielle Marie de Pérusse des Cars, who married Admiral Bertrand de Montesquiou-Fézenzac. Their only child, Mathilde de Montesquiou-Fézensac, was the wife of organist Charles-Marie Widor.

Through his daughter Marie-Paule, he was a grandfather of four: Casimir de Blacas d'Aulps, 3rd Duke of Blacas, 3rd Prince of Blacas; Louise-Henriette-Marie de Blacas d'Aulps (wife of Count René Hurault de Vibraye); Marie-Augustine-Yvonne de Blacas d’Aulps (wife of Alexander, 4th Prince of Sayn-Wittgenstein-Sayn); and Pierre de Blacas d'Aulps, 4th Duke of Blacas, 4th Prince of Blacas (who married Honorine de Durfort-Civrac, daughter of Marie-Henri-Louis de Durfort, 2d Marquis of Civrac).

Through his youngest daughter Geneviève, he was a grandfather of three: Antoin Manca-Amat, Marquis de Morès (who married American heiress Medora von Hoffman); (Note: Medora de Vallombrosa, Marquise de Morès (1856–1921), an American heiress, was the granddaughter of John Randolph Grymes, the former U.S. Attorney for Western District of Louisiana under President James Madison. Her aunt, and namesake, Medora, was the second wife of banker and lobbyist Samuel Ward.) Louise Claire Isabelle Manca de Vallombrosa (who married Christian Charles Louis, Count Lafond); and Amédée Manca, Comte de Vallombrosa (who married Adrienne Lannes de Montebello). (Note: Adrienne Lannes de Montebello was the daughter of Jean Alban Lannes, 2nd Baron de Montebello and a granddaughter of Gustave Olivier Lannes, Baron de Montebello (the fourth and youngest son of Napoleon's Marshal Jean Lannes, Duke of Montebello, Prince of Siewierz).)
