= Jean-François de Pérusse des Cars =

French diplomat and officer

- Duke of Cars
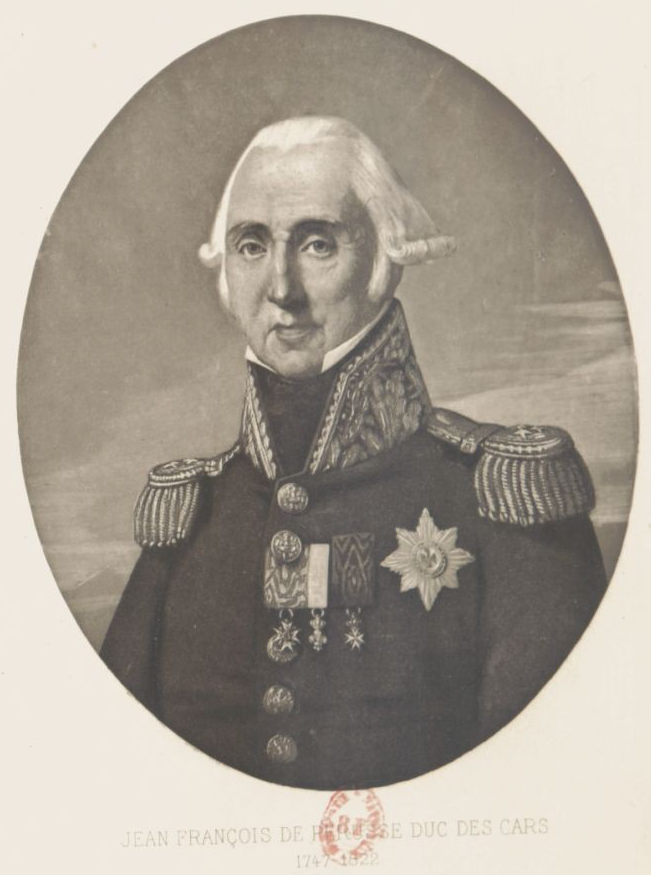
- Born: 13 November 1747; Château des Cars, Les Cars, France
- Died: 10 November 1822 (aged 74); Tuileries Palace, Paris, France
- Spouses: Pauline Louise Joséphine de Laborde (m. 1783; died 1792) Rosalie de Rancher de La Ferrière (m. 1798)
- Issue: Euphrasie Françoise Joséphine de Pérusse des Cars
- Father: François Marie de Pérusse des Cars
- Mother: Marie Emilie de Fitz-James

Jean-François de Pérusse des Cars (13 November 1747 – 10 November 1822) was a French nobleman who was a grandson of James FitzJames, 1st Duke of Berwick, the illegitimate son of King James II of England.

== Early life ==
Jean-François de Pérusse des Cars was born at the Château des Cars in Les Cars, France on 13 November 1747. He was the youngest of four children born to Marie Emilie de Fitz-James (1715–1770), a Lady-in-Waiting to Queen Marie (the wife of King Louis XV), and Lt.-Gen. François Marie de Pérusse des Cars (1709–1759), Comte des Cars and Marquis de Pranzac. His eldest brother was Louis François Marie de Perusse des Cars, who succeeded their father as Comte des Cars and Marquis de Pranzac. His other brother was Jacques François de Pérusse des Cars, who was a naval officer. His only sister, Françoise Émilie de Pérusse des Cars, was the wife of Armand de Montmartel, Marquis de Brunoy (son of the financier Jean Pâris de Monmartel).

His paternal grandparents were Louis François de Pérusse des Cars, Comte des Cars and Marquis de Pranzac, and the former Marie-Françoise-Victoire de Verthamon. His uncle was Louis-Nicolas de Pérusse des Cars, Marquis des Cars (father of François-Nicolas-René de Pérusse des Cars, Comte des Cars and grandfather of Amédée de Pérusse des Cars, 2nd Duc des Cars). His maternal grandparents were the former Anne Bulkeley (daughter of Hon. Henry Bulkeley, Master of the Household to James II) and Marshal James FitzJames, 1st Duke of Berwick, the Anglo-French military leader under King Louis XIV who was an illegitimate son of King James II by Arabella Churchill, sister of the 1st Duke of Marlborough.

== Career ==
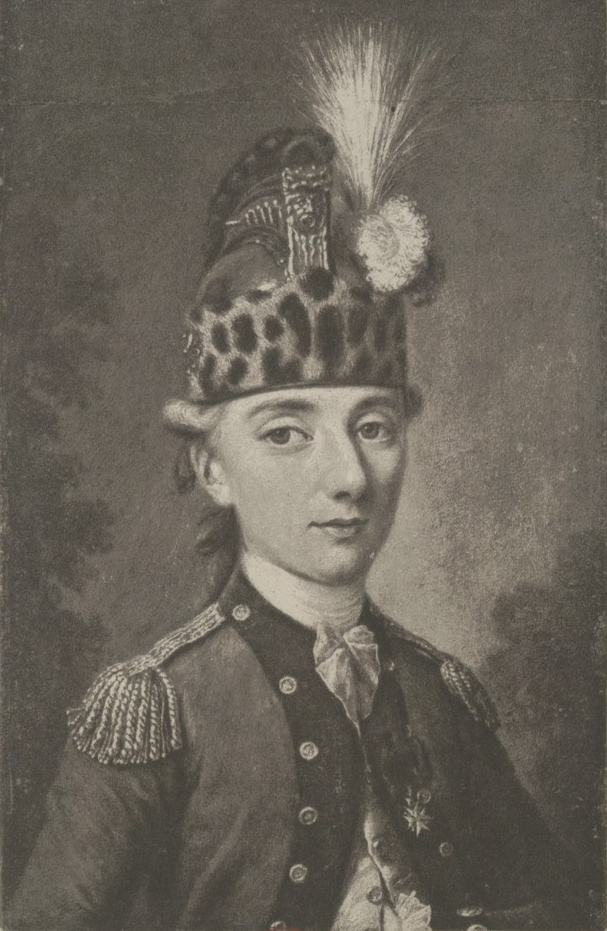
Pérusse des Cars in a Dragoons officer's uniform.

Pérusse des Cars served in the French Navy before he joined the Army and was appointed Maître de camp (equivalent to Colonel) of the Dragoons-Artois regiment in 1774. After the death of his second brother during the Battle of the Saintes in 1782, he took the title Baron des Cars. In 1783, he became first Maître d'hôtel du Roi of the King. In January 1784, he was made a Brigadier of cavalry followed by Lt.-Gen. on 9 March 1788. He served as député aux États-généraux in 1789, and left the country with the French princes in 1790 during the French Revolution. In 1791, he was sent on a diplomatic mission to King Gustav III of Sweden, followed by further missions, including in Berlin.

He was created Lieutenant-General of the Armies on 22 June 1814 and Premier Maître d'hôtel du Roi to King Louis XVIII on 23 August 1814. After the death of his eldest brother in March 1814, (Note: In 1814, upon the death of his eldest brother, Louis François Marie de Perusse des Cars, the marquisate of Pranzac became extinct.) he was created Count of Cars and brevet Duke of Cars on 9 March 1816. The dukedom was officially registered with the regional Parlement by letters patent on 29 December 1817. The Duke was awarded the Grand Cross of the Order of Saint Louis.

== Personal life ==
On 5 May 1783, Pérusse des Cars married Pauline Louise Joséphine de Laborde (1767–1792), a daughter of the financier Jean-Joseph de Laborde. Before her death in 1792, they were the parents of a daughter, Euphrasie Françoise Joséphine de Pérusse des Cars, who was born in Paris in 1787.

In 1798, he remarried to Rosalie de Rancher de La Ferrière. Rosalie, the widow of the Marquis de Nadaillac, was a daughter of François-Michel-Antoine de Rancher, Marquis de Ferrières, and Odile-Thérèse-Hélène Testu de Balincourt.

The Duke of Cars died on 10 November 1822 at Tuileries Palace in Paris without male issue. In 1825, the title was renewed on behalf of Amédée-François-Régis de Perusse des Cars, the son of the Duke's first cousin. Since its renewal, the title has been inherited by a son of the preceding Duke.
