= Amédée de Vallombrosa =

French organist and composer (1880–1968)

Amédée Joseph Gabriel Marie Manca-Amat, Comte de Vallombrosa (24 March 1880 – 9 February 1968) was a French organist and composer.

== Early life ==
Born in Cannes, Amédée de Vallombrosa was the son of Riccardo Manca-Amat, 4th Duke of Vallombrosa and Asinara (b. 1834), and Geneviève de Pérusse des Cars (b. 1836). He was the younger brother of Antoine-Amédée-Marie-Vincent Manca Amat de Vallombrosa, Marquis de Morès, who was a well-known frontier ranchman in the Badlands of Dakota Territory during the final years of the American Old West who was assassinated in Algeria in 1896.

His paternal grandparents were Vincenzo Maria Giuseppe Manca-Amat, 3rd Duke of Vallombrosa and Asinara and Léontine Alexandrine Claire de Galard de Béarn. His maternal grandparents were Amédée-François-Régis de Pérusse des Cars, Comte des Cars and Duc des Cars, Peer of France, and Augustine-Joséphine du Bouchet de Sourches de Tourzel (a granddaughter of Louise-Élisabeth du Bouchet de Sourches, Duchess of Tourzel). His aunt, Marie-Paule de Pérusse des Cars, was the first wife of Louis, Duke of Blacas.

== Career ==
Despite his family fortune, the Comte de Vallombrosa did not choose the path of business but devoted his life to music and the organ at an early age. He was the pupil, substitute and friend of the great organist Charles-Marie Widor and composed several pieces himself. In 1910, he succeeded Camille Rage to the great organ of the Église Saint-Leu-Saint-Gilles de Paris, while also holding the position of Kapellmeister. In 1928, he succeeded Félix Raugel as head of chapel of the église Saint-Eustache.

He continued to work on music until the end of his life. At more than 80 years old, he still played on the choir organ of the Saint-Eustache church.

== Personal life ==
On 20 November 1906, he married Adrienne Lannes de Montebello in Paris. She was the daughter of Jean Alban Lannes, 2nd Baron de Montebello and Albertine de Briey and a granddaughter of Gustave Olivier Lannes, Baron de Montebello (the fourth and youngest son of Napoleon's Marshal Jean Lannes, Duke of Montebello, Prince of Siewierz). Their daughter:

- Roselyne de Vallombrosa (1910–1988), who married Foulques de Sabran-Pontevès, 7th Duke of Sabran (1908–1973), in 1936. The Duke was a son of Elzéar, Comte de Sabran-Pontevès and Princess Constance of Croÿ.

The Comte de Vallombrosa died in the 7th arrondissement of Paris on 9 February 1968, aged 87.

=== Descendants ===
Through his daughter Roselyne, he was a grandfather of Gersende de Sabran-Pontevès (b. 1942), who married Prince Jacques, Duke of Orléans (b. 1941), a son of Henri, Count of Paris, the Orléanist pretender to the French throne, in 1969. Their son, the Comte de Vallombrosa's great-grandson, is Prince Charles Louis, Duke of Chartres.
