= Asclepius of Milos =

Part of an ancient Greek statue

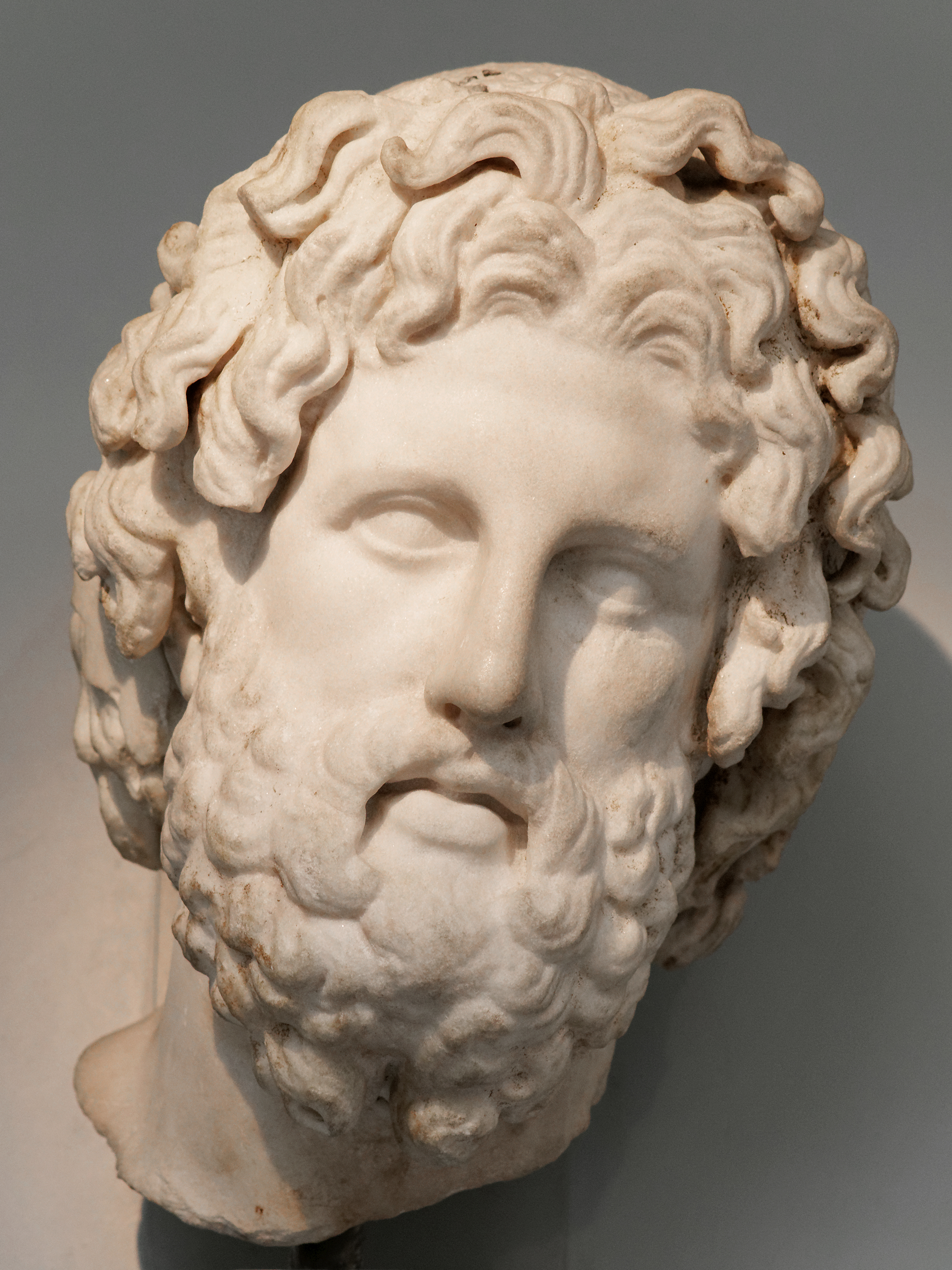
- The Asclepius of Milos on display in the British Museum
- Material: Marble
- Size: 60 cm (24 in) high
- Created: 325–300 BC
- Present location: British Museum, London
- Registration: 1867,0508.115

The Asclepius of Milos or Asklepios of Melos is a marble head from what was once a colossal ancient Greek statue of Asclepius found on the island of Milos in Greece. It was acquired by the British Museum along with the rest of the Blacas collection in 1867.

== Discovery ==
The head was found in the mid nineteenth century at the shrine of Asclepius on the island of Milos in the Cyclades, Greece. It was later acquired by the French diplomat and collector Louis, Duke of Blacas. The Blacas collection was purchased in its entirety by the British Museum in 1867.

== Description ==
The head is made from Parian marble and was once part of a twice life-size cult statue of the ancient Greek god of medicine and healing Asclepius (or Asklepios). It was made from three pieces, only two of which are extant. Around the head are drill holes and lead pegs for a now missing gold wreath that once crowned the statue. The serene expression on the deity's face is typical of Hellenistic sculpture from this period. Asclepius would probably have been shown standing semi-nude, clasping a staff of Asclepius, a staff with a serpent wrapped around it, as was typical of late-Hellenistic and Roman representations of the god.

== Gallery ==
Asclepius of Milos

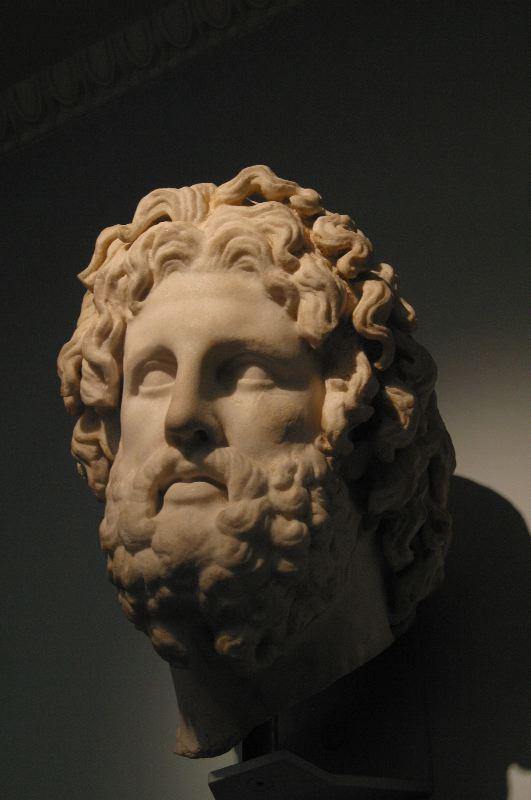
Alternative view of the head.

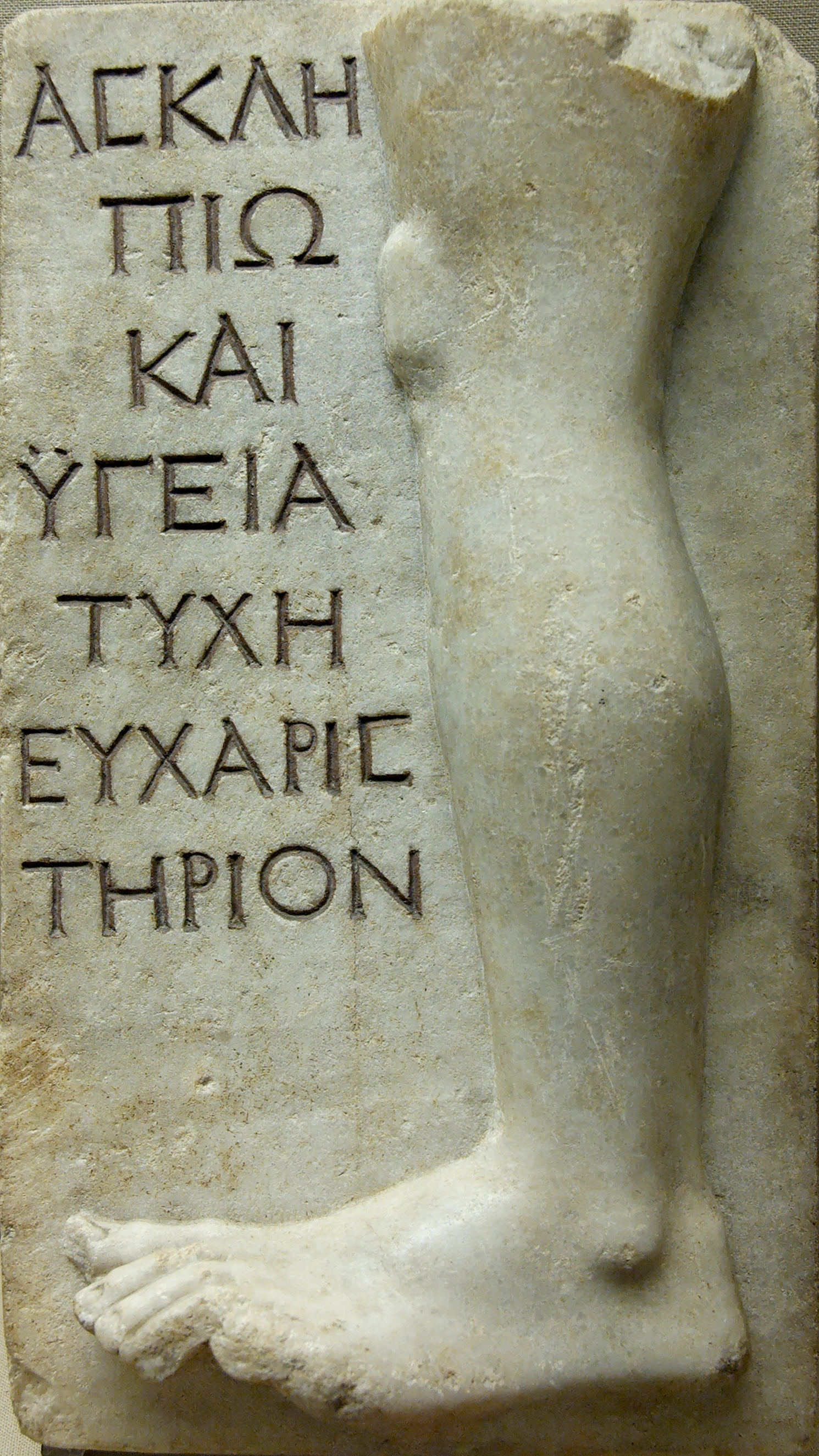
Roman votive relief left at the shrine of Asclepius (100-200 AD).

== See also ==
- Venus de Milo
- Poseidon of Melos
