= Duke of Cars =

French noble title

Coat of arms of the Pérusse des Cars family

Duke of Cars (French: duc des Cars, comte des Cars) is a French noble title that was first created in 1816.

== Creation of the title ==
Jean-François de Pérusse des Cars (Note: Jean-François de Pérusse des Cars (1747–1822) was the youngest of four children born to Marie Emilie FitzJames (a Lady-in-Waiting to Queen Marie, the wife of King Louis XV), and Lt.-Gen. François Marie de Pérusse des Cars, Comte des Cars e Marquis de Pranzac. His paternal grandparents were Louis François de Pérusse des Cars, Comte des Cars and Marquis de Pranzac, and the former Marie-Françoise-Victoire de Verthamon. His uncle was Louis-Nicolas de Pérusse des Cars, Marquis des Cars (father of François-Nicolas-René de Pérusse des Cars, Comte des Cars and grandfather of Amédée de Pérusse des Cars, 2nd Duc de Cars).His paternal grandfather was Marshal James FitzJames, 1st Duke of Berwick (an illegitimate son of King James II), the Anglo-French military leader under King Louis XIV. His paternal grandmother was Anne Bulkeley (daughter of Hon. Henry Bulkeley, Master of the Household to James II).) was created Lieutenant-General of the Armies on 22 June 1814 and Premier Maître d'hôtel du Roi to King Louis XVIII on 23 August 1814. (Note: Jean-François de Pérusse des Cars, the 1st Duke of Cars, married Pauline Louise Joséphine de Laborde (1767–1792), a daughter of the financier Jean-Joseph de Laborde, in 1783. After her death, he married Rosalie de Rancher de La Ferrière, widow of the Marquis de Nadaillac, and daughter of François-Michel-Antoine de Rancher, Marquis de Ferrières, in 1798.) After the death of his eldest brother in March 1814, (Note: His eldest brother was François Marie de Pérusse des Cars (1709–1759), Comte des Cars e Marquis de Pranzac. His other brother was Jacques François de Pérusse des Cars, who died during the Battle of the Saintes in 1782.) he was created Count of Cars and brevet Duke of Cars on 9 March 1816. The dukedom was officially registered with the regional Parlement on 29 December 1817.

The 1st Duke died on 10 November 1822 at Tuileries Palace in Paris without male issue. In 1825, the title was renewed on behalf of the son of the Duke's first cousin, Amédée François Régis de Perusse des Cars. Since its renewal, the title has been inherited by a son of the preceding Duke.

== List of dukes of Cars ==
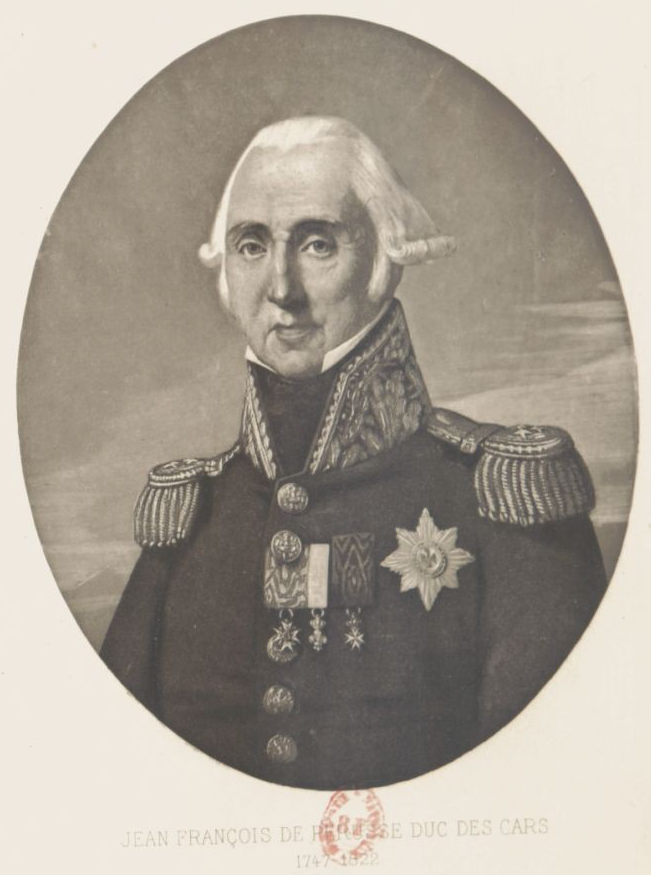
Jean-François de Pérusse des Cars, 1st Duke of Cars

The dukes of Cars since 1816:

From	To	Duke of Cars	Relationship to predecessor
1816	1822	Jean-François de Pérusse des Cars (1747–1822)	1st Duke of Cars
1825	1868	Amédée-François-Régis de Pérusse des Cars (1790–1868)	Cousin of the previous
1868	1891	François Joseph de Pérusse des Cars (1819–1891)	Son of the previous
1891	1920	Louis Albert Auguste Philibert de Pérusse des Cars (1849–1920)	Son of the previous
1920	1941	François Marie Edmond de Pérusse des Cars (1875–1941)	Son of the previous
1941	1961	Louis Charles Marie de Pérusse des Cars (1909–1961)	Son of the previous
1961	2021	Francois-Amédée Marie de Pérusse des Cars (1932-2021)	Son of the previous
2021	Incumbent	Louis-Amédée de Pérusse des Cars (b. 1962)	Son of the previous

== Pérusse des Cars estates ==
- Château des Cars (Haute-Vienne), original seat of the Pérusse des Cars family.
- Château de Montal in Laroquebrou, municipal property, acquired by marriage in 1595 with Rose de Montal.
- Château de Saint-Jean-de-Lespinasse in Saint-Jean-Lespinasse, acquired by marriage in 1591 to Rose de Montal.
- Château de Sourches in Saint-Symphorien (Sarthe), inherited in 1845.
- Château d'Abondant in Abondant (Eure-et-Loir), inherited in 1845, sold in 1902.
- Château de La Roche-de-Bran in Montamisé (Vienne), bought in 1828, destroyed by fire by the Nazis in 1944.
- Château de Beauvais in Lussas-et-Nontronneau (Dordogne), the 17th and 18th centuries.
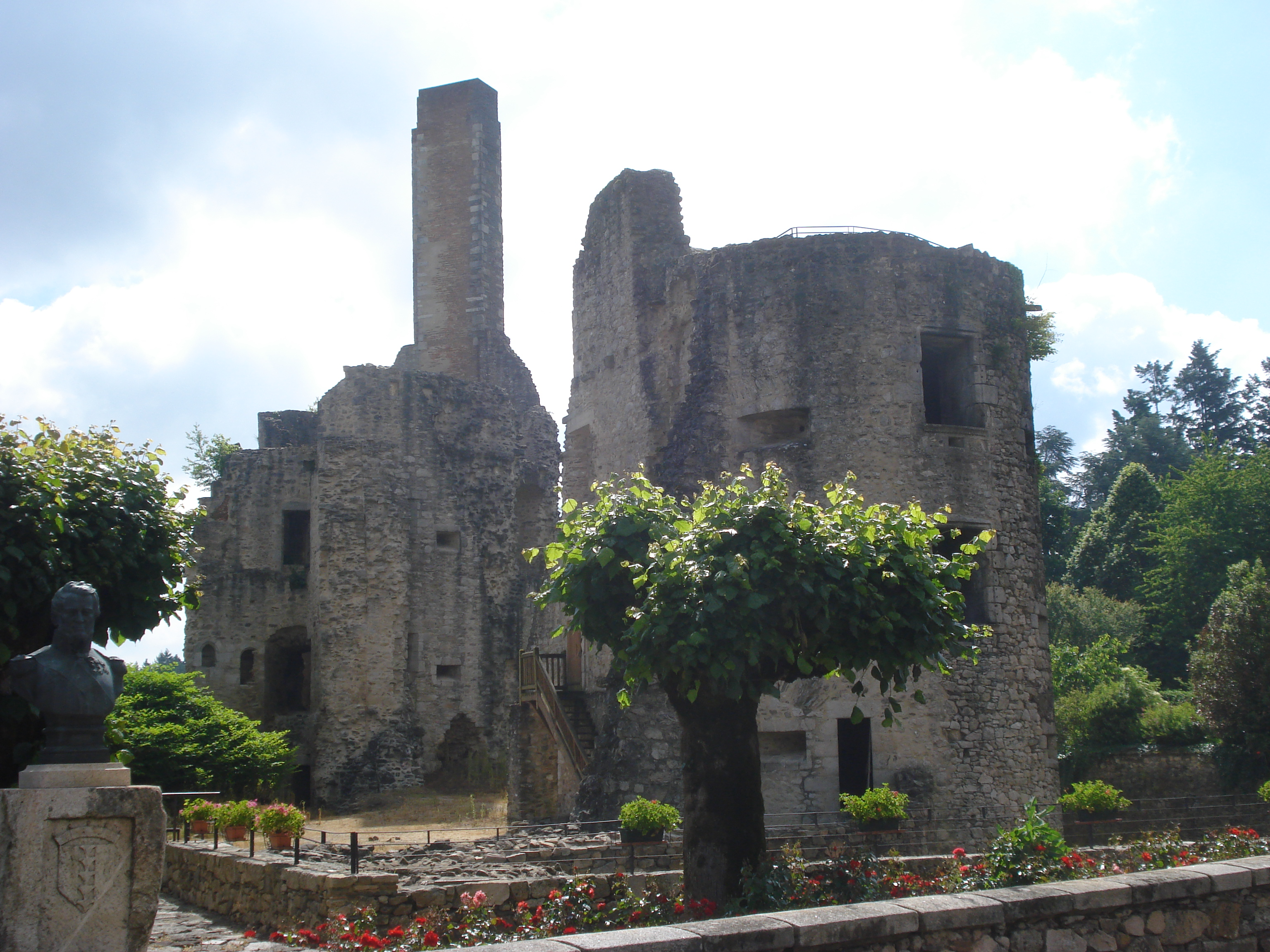
Ruins of the Château des Cars

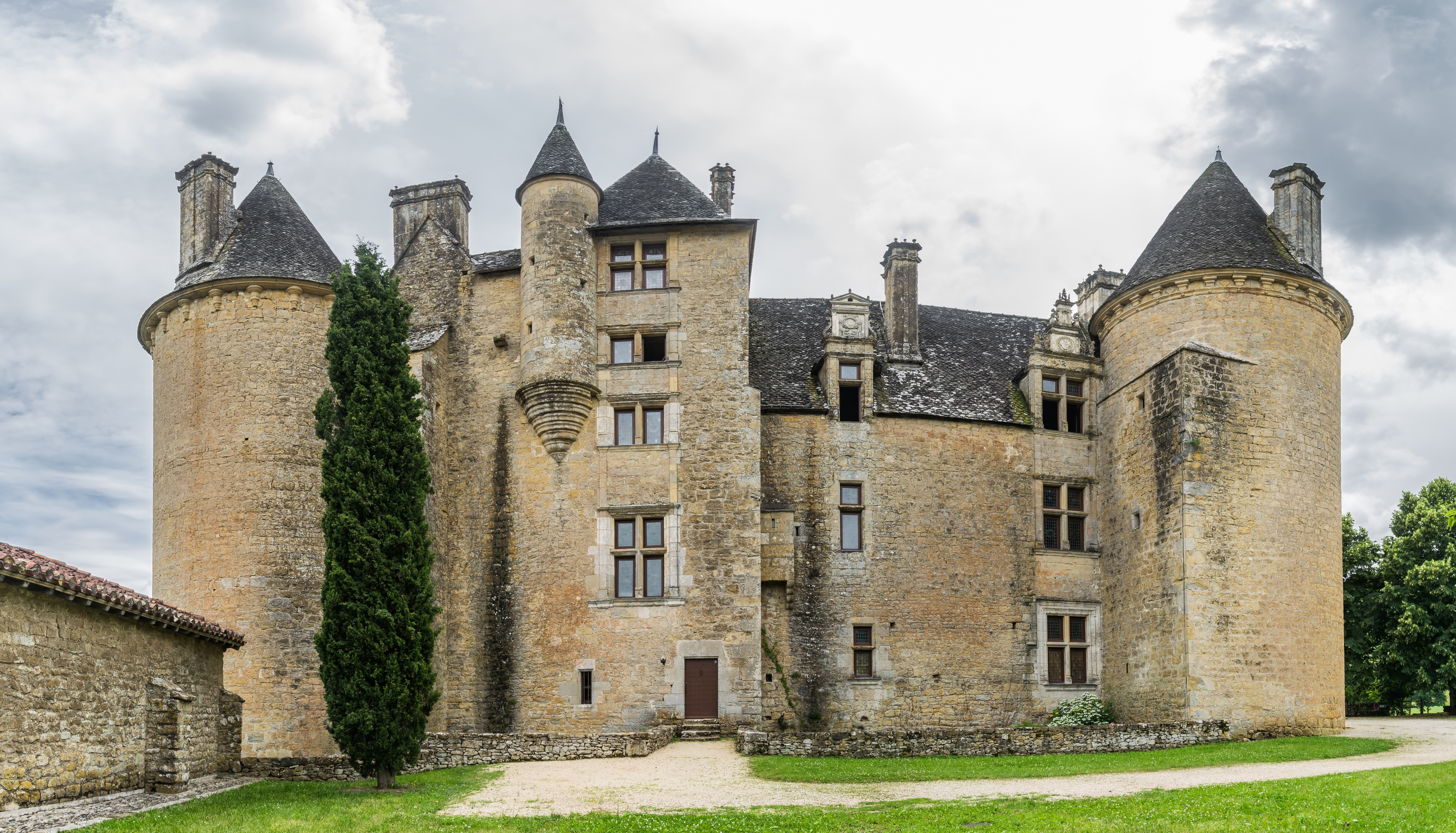
Château de Montal in Saint-Jean-Lespinasse

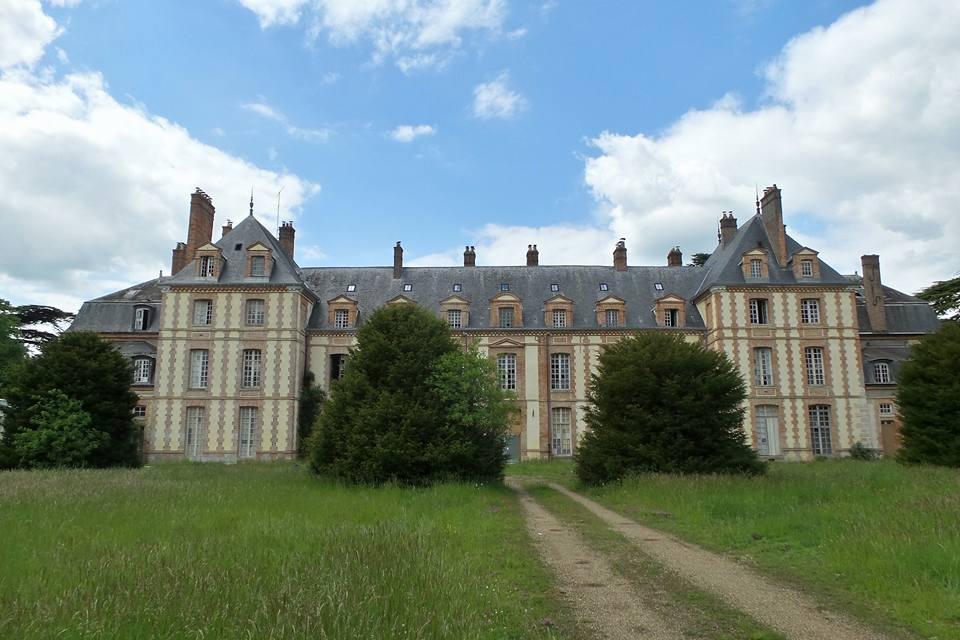
Château d'Abondant in Abondant

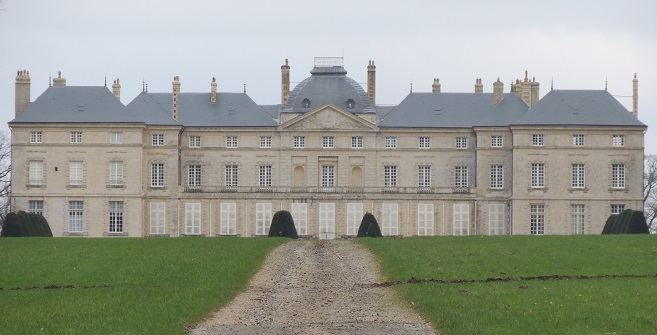
Château de Sourches in Saint-Symphorien, Sarthe

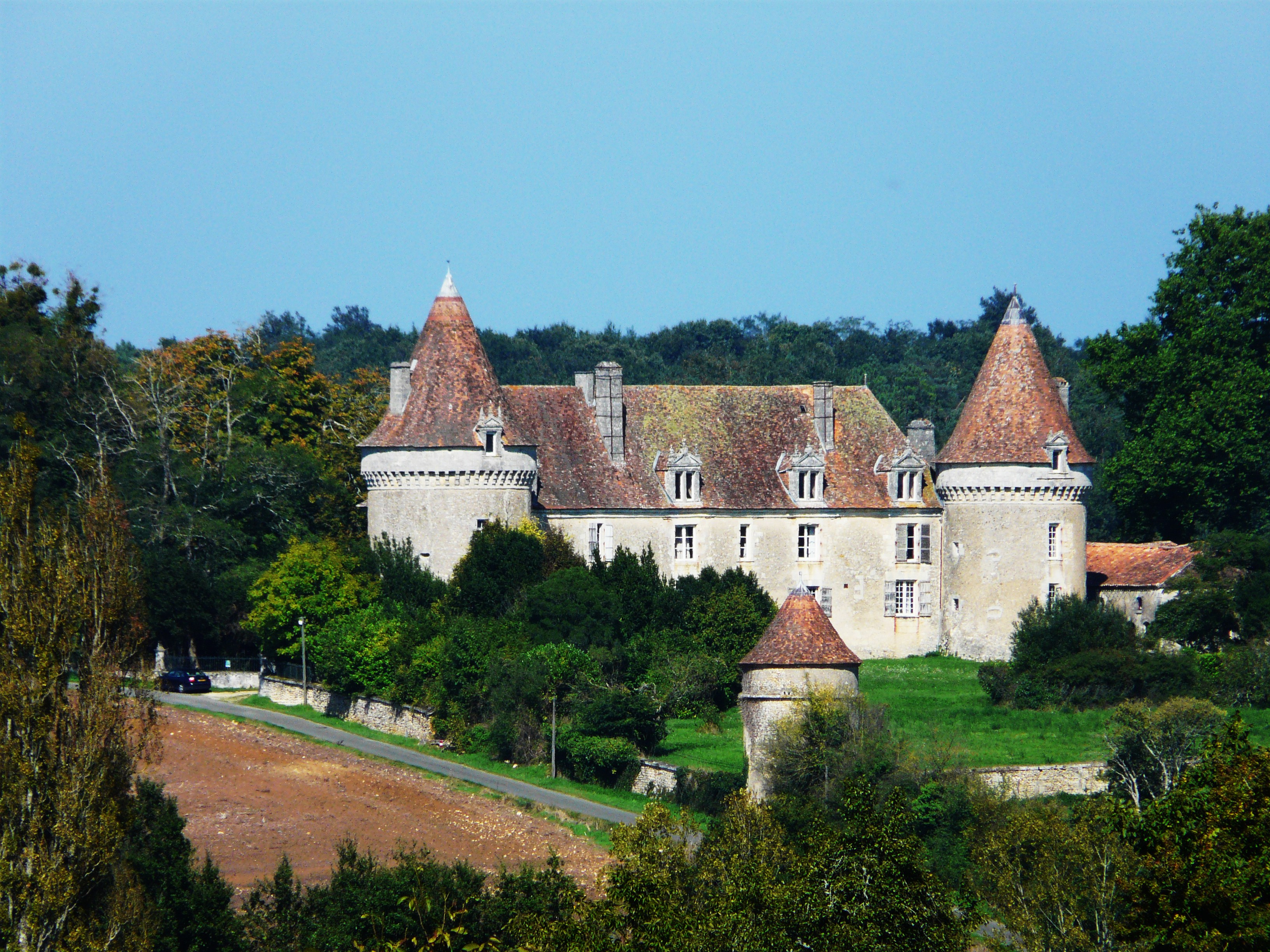
Château de Beauvais in Lussas-et-Nontronneau

== See also ==
- List of French dukedoms
- House of Pérusse des Cars
