= Château des Cars =

Castle in France

Coordinates: 45.6796°N 1.0734°E

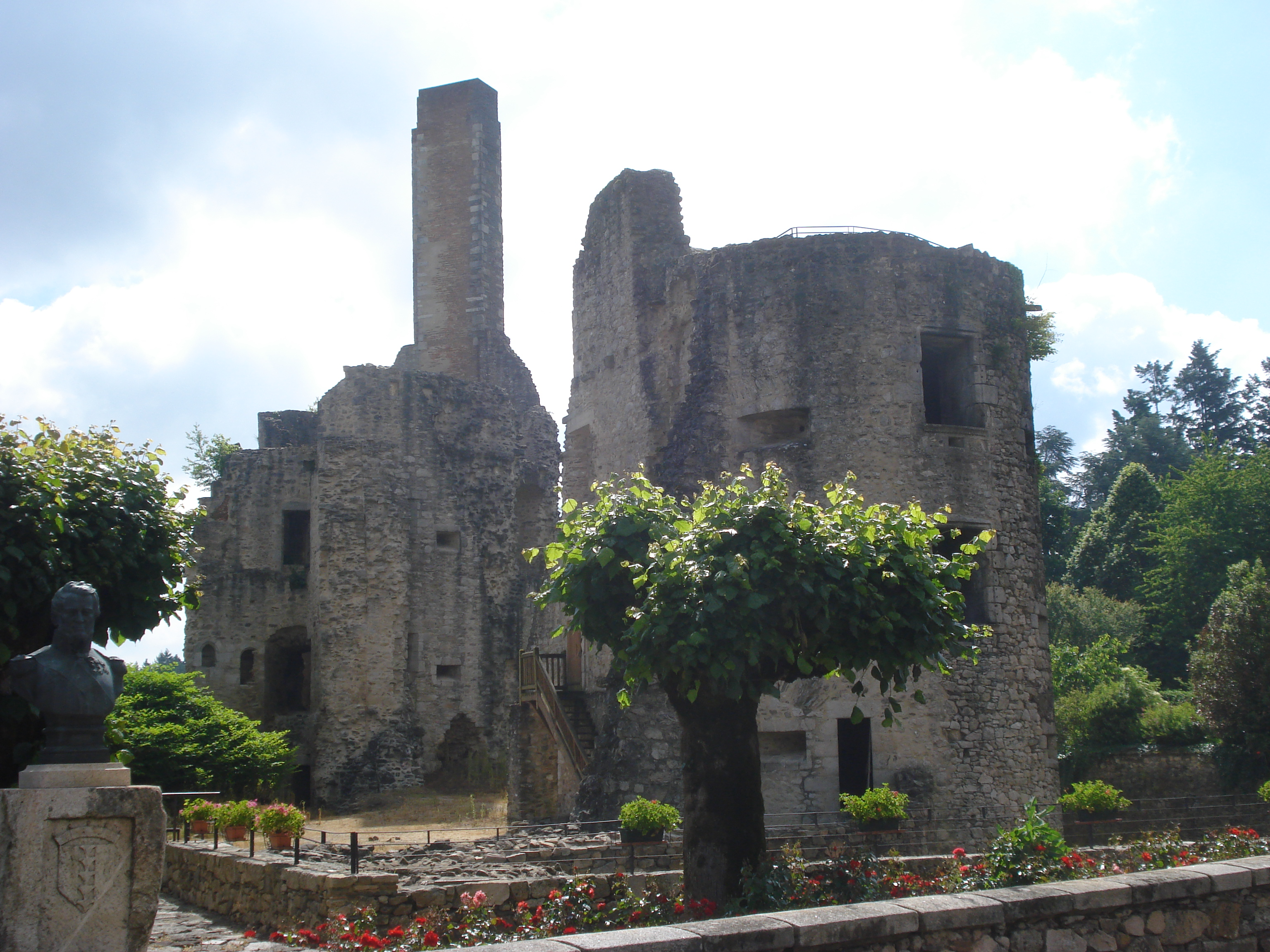
Ruins of château des Cars

The Château des Cars is a ruined castle at Les Cars in the Limousin region of west France. It was traditionally the residence of the Pérusse family.

== Architecture ==
The castle was built as a square with sides of 30 metres length inside which was a tall main tower, the principal living accommodation, and angle towers, arranged around an inner courtyard. The castle had a moat and drawbridge and was surrounded by a second perimeter wall beyond which were landscaped gardens.

== History ==
A small castle or a fortified house certainly already occupied the place from the 12th century. Eventually, in the 14th century, the castle passed from the Barrys of Aixe to the Pérusses, a family of knights originally from Ségur-le-Château in Correze. At the end of the 15th century, Geoffrey Pérusse, built a residence at Les Cars, which became the location of the family's principal residence. With gardens installed in the 16th Century, and latter extended in the 18th century. Jacques François de Pérusse des Cars was born there in 1738.

At the time of the French Revolution, the Pérusse family emigrated to England and the castle was pillaged and eventually sold to quarrymen who demolished it for re-sale as building material, sparing only the artillery tower in the south-west angle and part of the main tower. Today, the castle is the property of the commune, which is trying, with the help of an archaeological society, to display the remains effectively. it is a Listed Historical monument of the ministère français de la Culture.

== Gallery (2015) ==
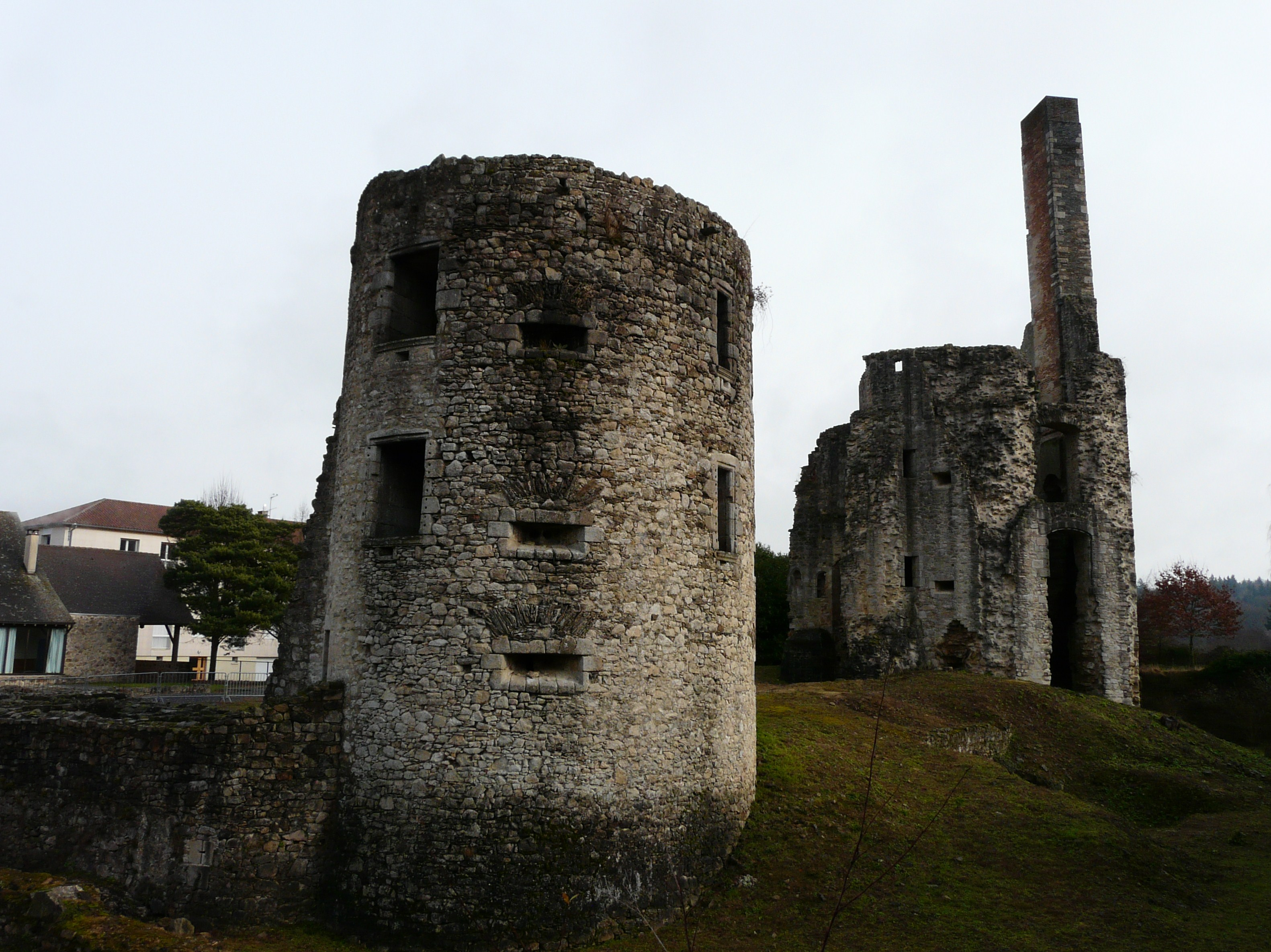
The ruins

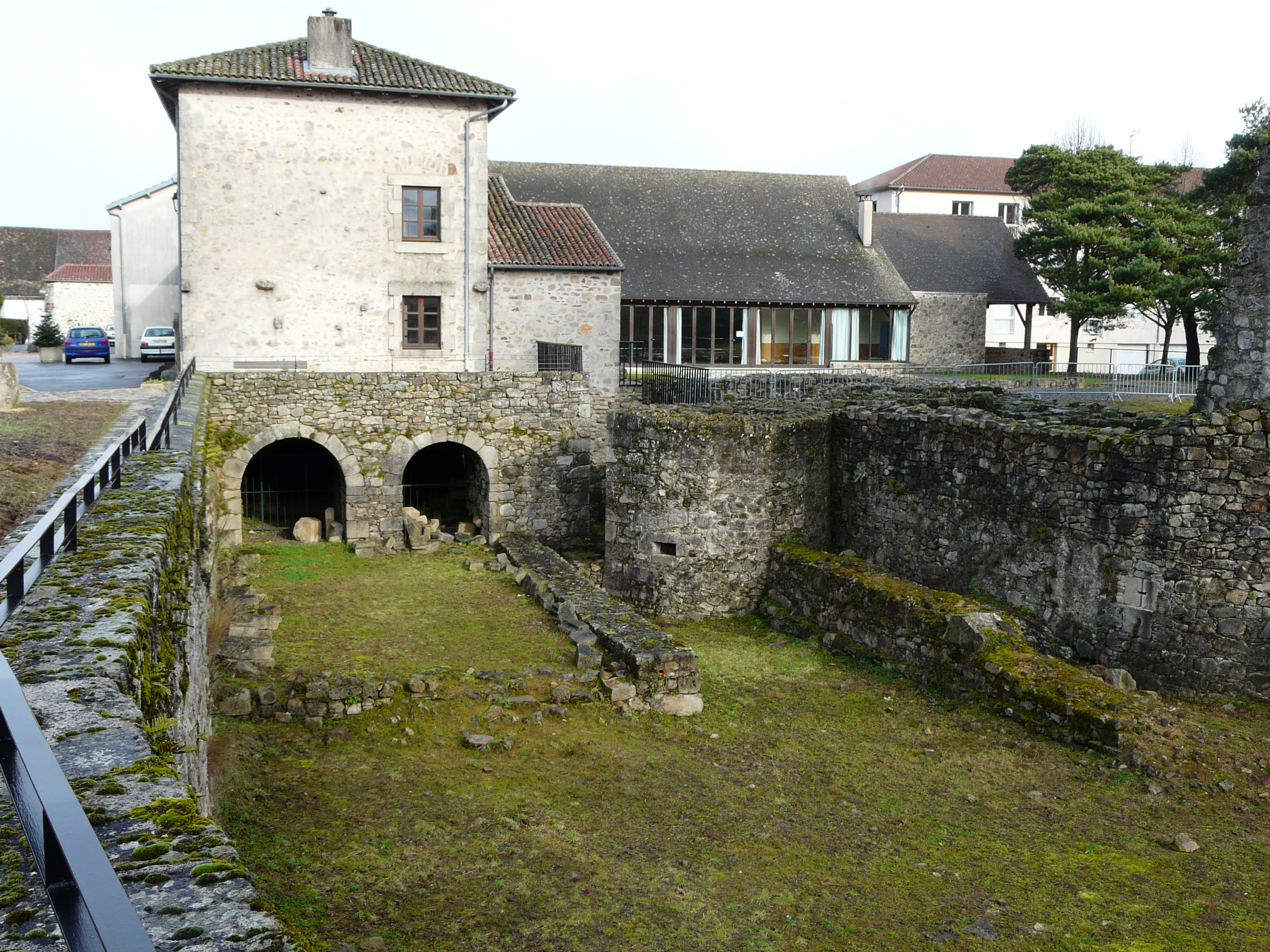

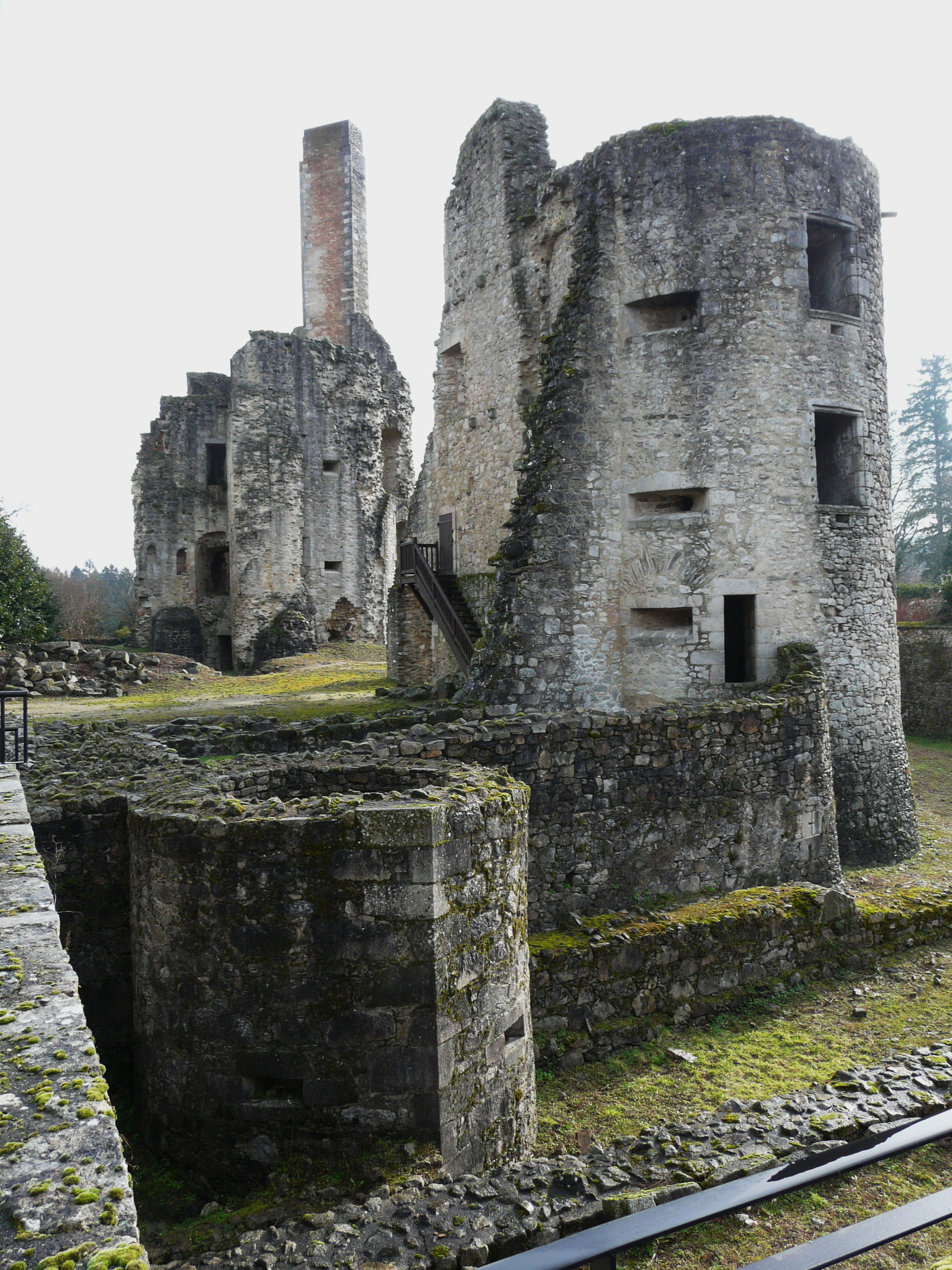

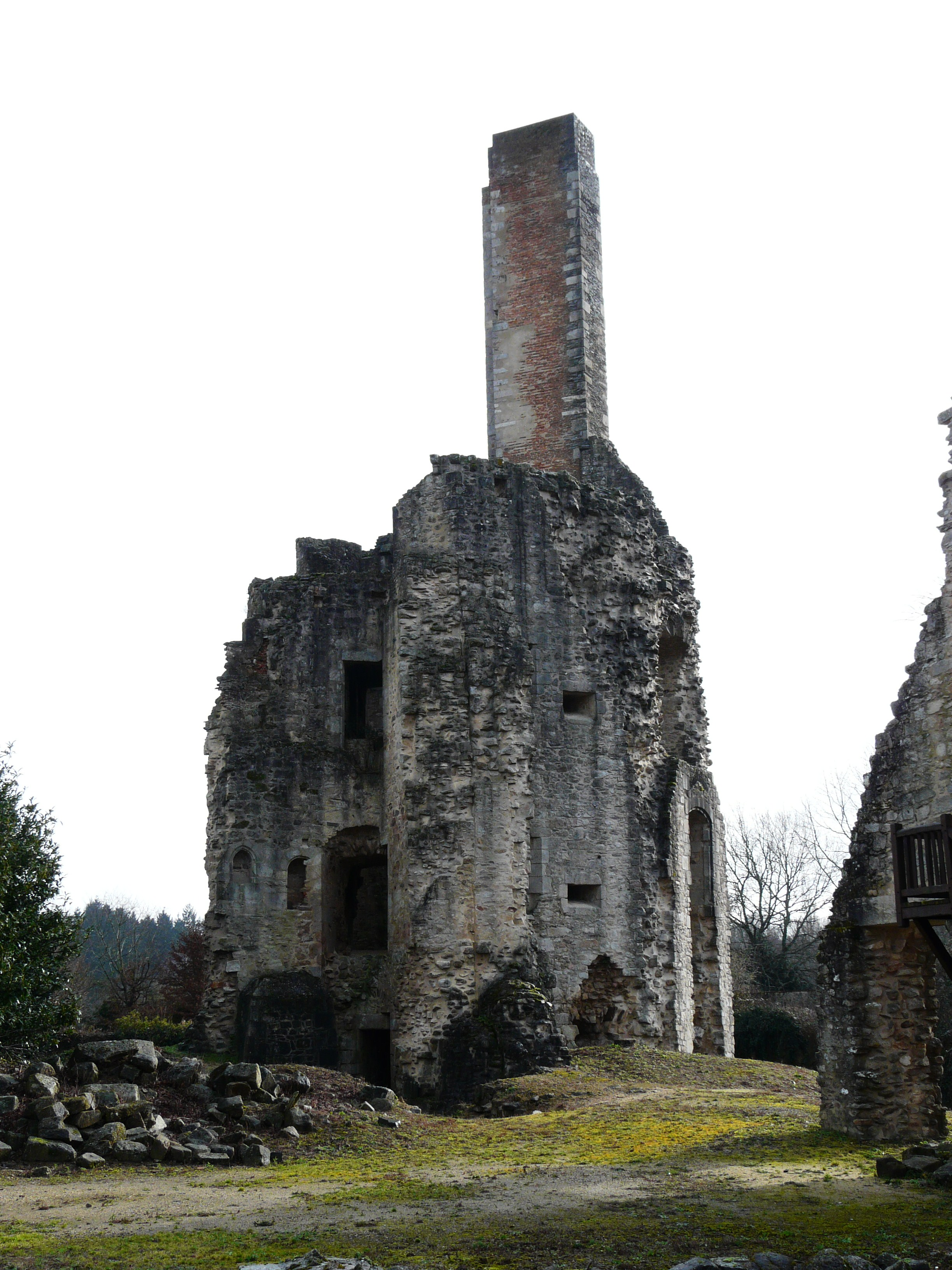

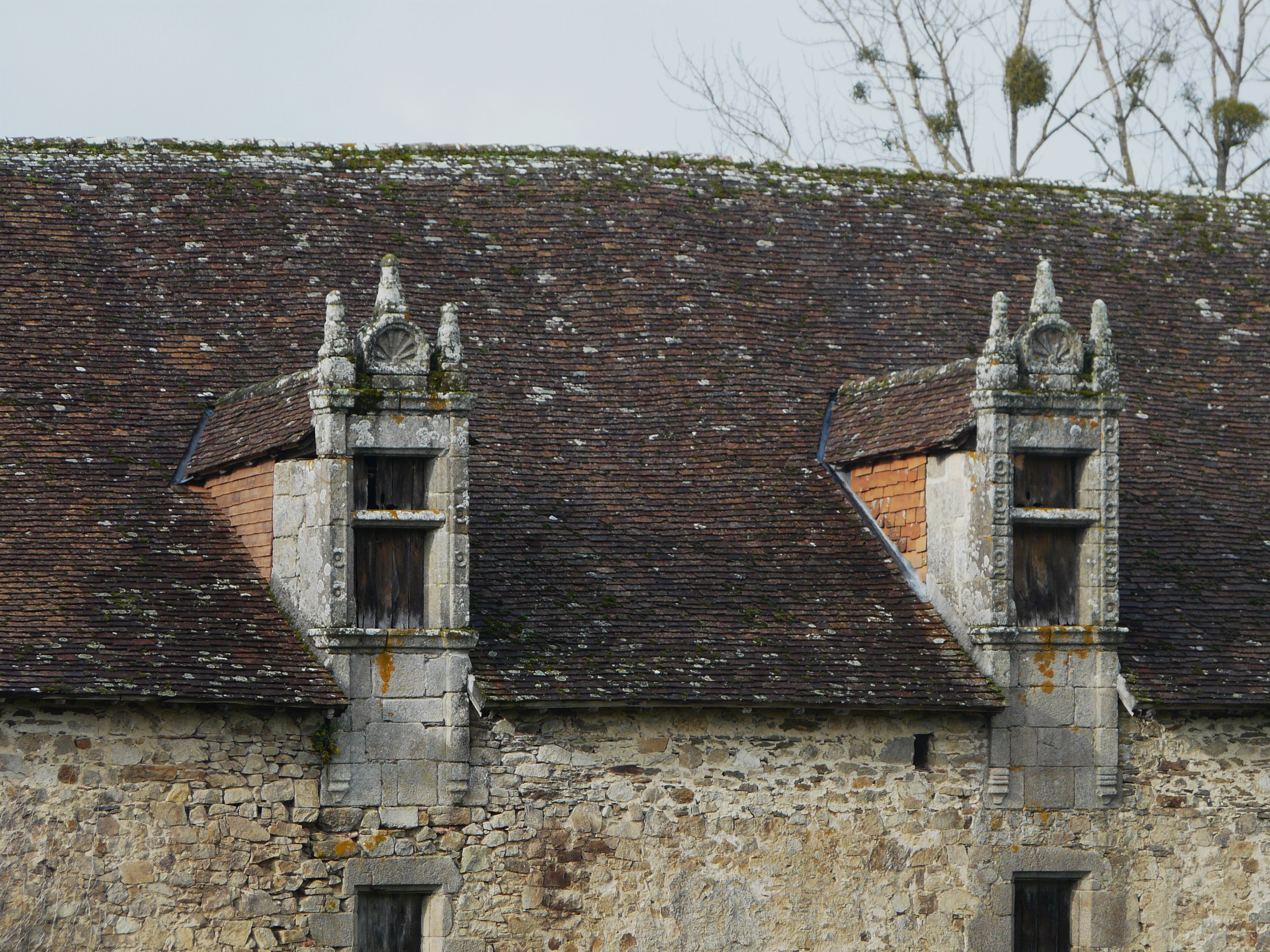
Skylights of the stables building

== Sources and references ==
Notes

Citations

Bibliography

- Contenson, Ludovic (1934). La Société des Cincinnati de France et la guerre d'Amérique (1778-1783). Paris: éditions Auguste Picard. OCLC 7842336.
