= Lussas-et-Nontronneau =

- Commune
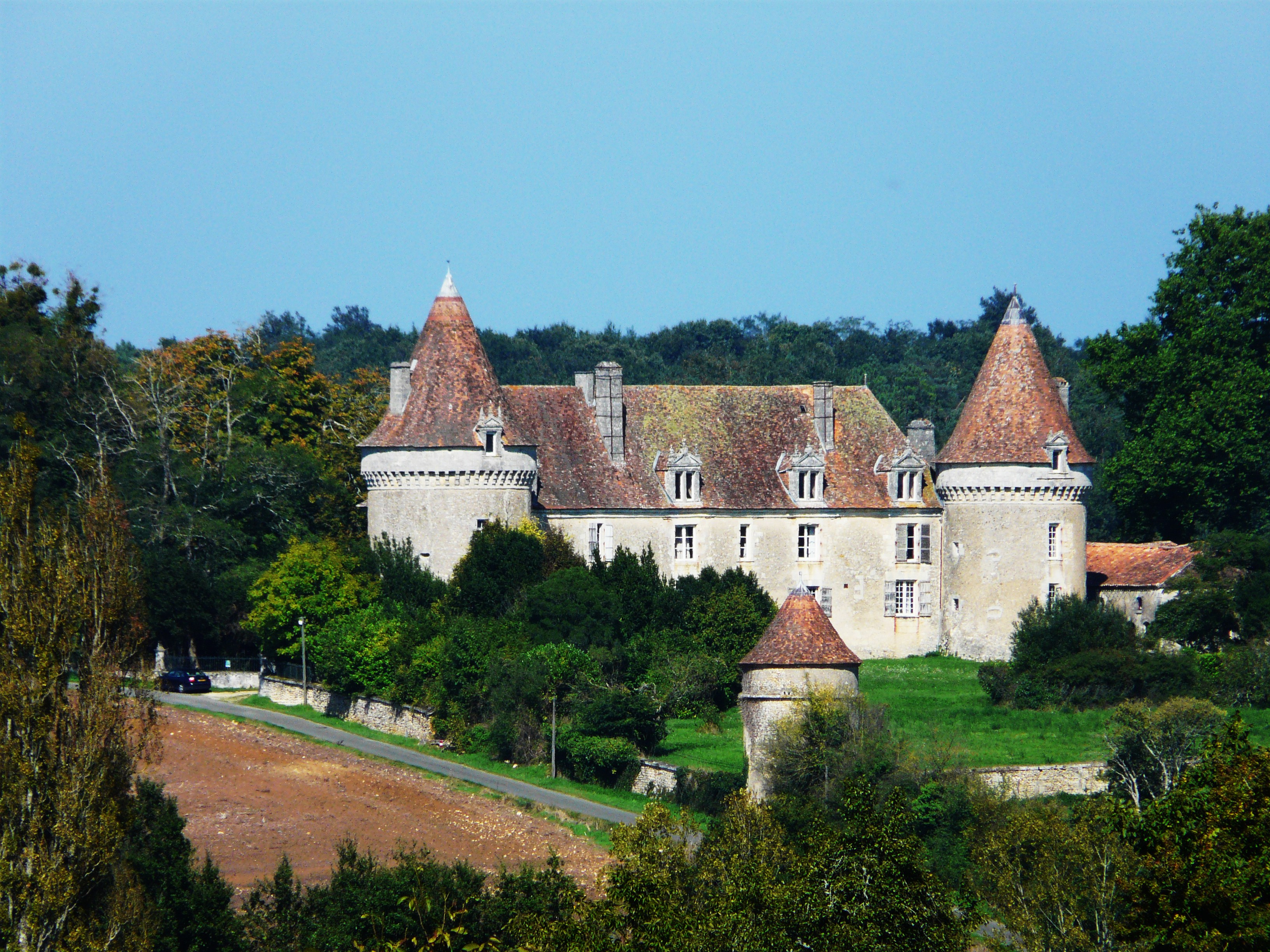
- Chateau of Beauvais
- Location of Lussas-et-Nontronneau
- Location within France Location within Nouvelle-Aquitaine
- Coordinates: 45°30′23″N 0°35′04″E
- Country: France
- Region: Nouvelle-Aquitaine
- Department: Dordogne
- Arrondissement: Nontron
- Canton: Périgord Vert Nontronnais

Government
  - Mayor (2020–2026): Mauricette Belly
- Area^{1}: 22.35 km^{2} (8.63 sq mi)
- Highest elevation: 232 m (761 ft)
- Lowest elevation: 125 m (410 ft)
- Population (2023): 283
  - Density: 12.7/km^{2} (32.8/sq mi)
- Time zone: UTC+01:00 (CET)
  - Summer (DST): UTC+02:00 (CEST)
- INSEE/Postal code: 24248 /24300
- ^{1} French Land Register data, which excludes lakes, ponds, glaciers > 1 km^{2} (0.386 sq mi or 247 acres) and river estuaries.

Lussas-et-Nontronneau (French pronunciation: [lysas e nɔ̃tʁɔno]; Occitan: Luçac e Nontroneu [lyˈsaː e nũ.tɾuˈnø]) is a commune in the Dordogne department in Nouvelle-Aquitaine in southwestern France. In 1827, the former communes of Lussas and Nontronneau merged into Lussas-et-Nontronneau.

== Population ==
Historical population
Year	Pop.	±% p.a.
1968	364	—
1975	370	+0.23%
1982	359	−0.43%
1990	363	+0.14%
1999	371	+0.24%
2007	359	−0.41%
2012	310	−2.89%
2017	300	−0.65%
2023	283	−0.97%
Source: INSEE

== See also ==
- Communes of the Dordogne department
- Château de Beauvais (Lussas-et-Nontronneau)
