= Château d'Abondant =

Château in Eure-et-Loir, France

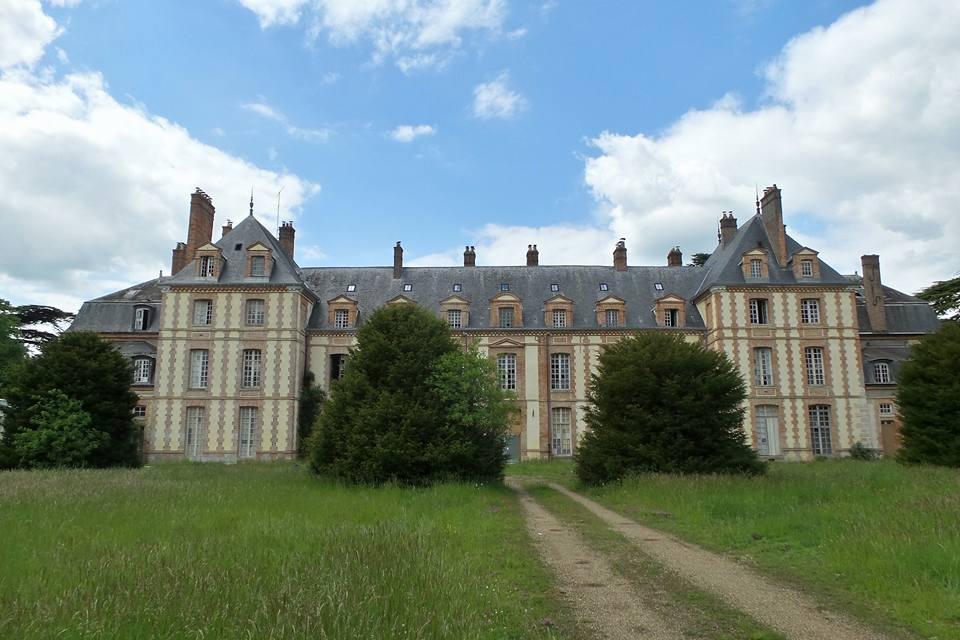

- Location within France
- 48°47′37″N 1°22′03″E
- Location: Abondant, Eure, France

History
- Built: 1750

Site notes
- Architect: Jean Mansart de Jouy
- Architectural style: Louis XIII

Monument historique
- Designated: 1928

Château d'Abondant is a château in Abondant, in the Eure-et-Loir department in northern France, built in the mid 17th century and significantly remodelled and enlarged in the 1750s under the direction of Jean Mansart de Jouy. The Château was designated as a French historic monument in 1928 and in 2018, it was restored and converted into apartments.

== History ==
The first recorded owner is Pierre Bigot, "Lord of Fay and forest Houdan." In 1485, Guillaume La Guiry is mentioned as Lord of Fay and Abondant, and, in 1560, Jean Mangot, Ensign; the land passed to his son Louis Mangot, who still owned the property in 1618. In the first quarter of the seventeenth century, Joachim de Bellengreville, Grand Provost of France, acquired the seigniory of Abondant. In 1645, his widow, Marie de La Noue (a granddaughter of Huguenot Capt. François de la Noue), traded the property with Jacques Bouchet de Sourches, Abbot of Saint-Martin of Troarn, for the estate of Montguichet, located near Gagny.

=== Bouchet de Sourches years ===
Around this time Jacques Bouchet de Sourches acquired the property, the château was built. In 1699, the estate went to the courtier Louis-François du Bouchet de Sourches. When he died in 1746, it was passed on to his son, Louis II du Bouchet de Sourches, Grand Prévôt of France. In the 1750s, Louis II hired architect Jean Mansart de Jouy to transform the residence into a four-storey château in the Louis XIII style, set on 200 acres of landscaped grounds. The main building was significantly enlarged with two symmetrical pavilions added to each end, along with kitchens and a grand staircase. In the right pavilion was a large salon, known as the Great Salon, which opened onto the park. The room had "a square design with curved angles, and was lit by three windows on the parterre side, and three others on the park side."

Louis' son, Louis François, the Marquis de Tourzel, inherited the estate, and his wife, Marie, a music lover, built a theatre on the grounds. Louis François was killed in a hunting accident in 1786. His widow, Louise-Élisabeth de Croÿ survived the French Revolution, and under the Restoration, she was made Duchess of Tourzel in 1816. The de Tourzel branch died out in 1845, and, through marriage, the estate passed to the Pérusse des Cars family. (Note: Augustine du Bouchet de Sourches de Tourzel (1798–1870), the daughter of Charles Louis du Bouchet de Sourches de Tourzel and Augustine Eléonore de Pons, married Amédée-François-Régis de Pérusse des Cars, 2nd Duke of Cars, in 1817.) In 1902, Louis Albert Philibert Augustin, 4th Duc des Cars, sold the estate (inherited through his wife). Before the château was sold, he dismantled the Grand Salon which was reassembled in 1903 in the new Parisian mansion of the Claire de Vallombrosa, Countess Lafond and reassembled again with some modifications in 1955. The salon was dismantled again in 1988 and reconstituted at the Musée du Louvre in 1994 where it remains.

=== Harjes years ===
In 1920, Paris-based American banker Henry Herman Harjes acquired the château from the Duchesse de Vallombrosa. The château was among a trio of prominent châteaux located near Dreux, in the Eure-et-Loir department in northern France, including Château d'Anet and Château Saint-Georges Motel (later owned by Consuelo Vanderbilt). near Paris. In 1923, his 25-year-old daughter Hope was killed in a riding accident at the château. Harjes, who was credited with introducing polo to France, died during a polo match in 1926 and the château and its estate was put up for sale. The château features were described as:

The first floor is laid out lavishly for entertainment and gracious living. On the second and third floors are seventeen master bedrooms and fourteen baths, many of them modernised. On the fourth floor are the servants' rooms. The outbuildings include a garage for eight cars, stables for thirty horses and kennels which have been used in the past for a pack of stag hounds. There also is a large group of farm buildings, including a modern dairy.

=== Koenigswarter years ===
In 1937, his son Henry sold the château to Baron Jules de Koenigswarter of Paris and his wife, the former Pannonica "Nica" Rothschild. When the French government surrendered to the Germans on 22 June 1940, Baron de Koenigswarters went to England to volunteer with the Free French Army. Nica remained at the château, "opening her doors to passing refugees and evacuees." Nica and their children were later forced to flee, first to England, and later to the United States, where she settled permanently.

=== Recent history ===
In the spring of 1945, the Château housed the El Alamein Center of the 1st French Free Forces. In 1951, the estate was modified into a medical and social institution dedicated to taking care of refugees and stateless elderly. A new gerontology unit was built in the grounds in 1991. In 2018, restoration work supervised by Daniel Levevre, chief architect of buildings in France, was completed converting the Château into fifty-four apartments.

== Gallery ==
Photographs of the Château in 2016, pre-renovation.

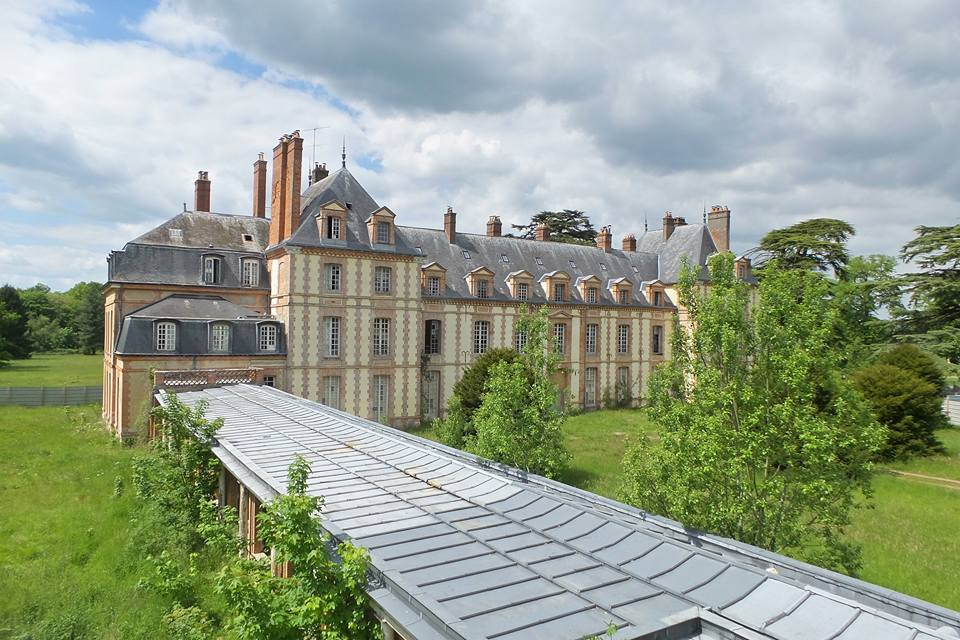

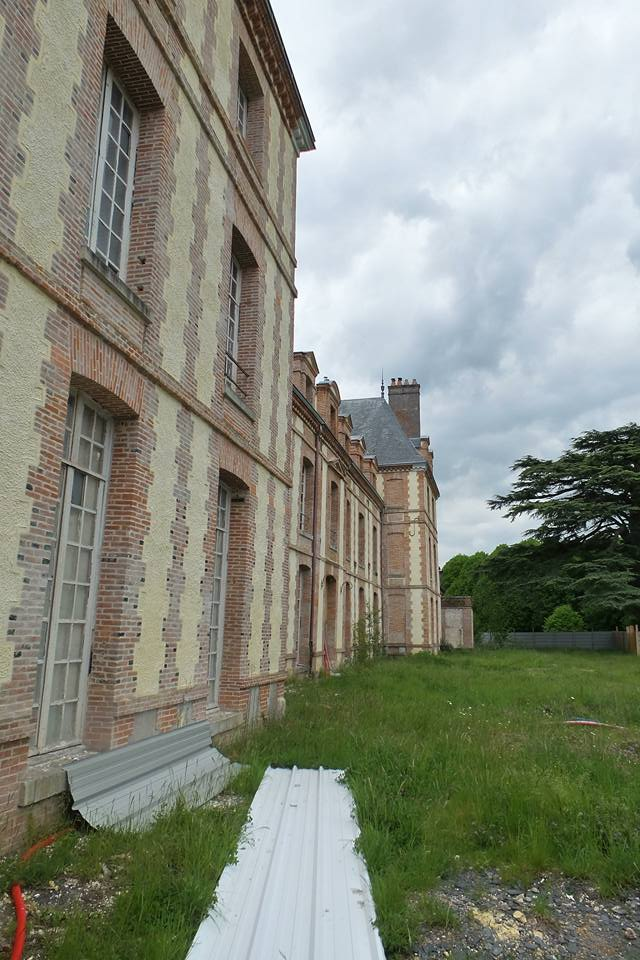

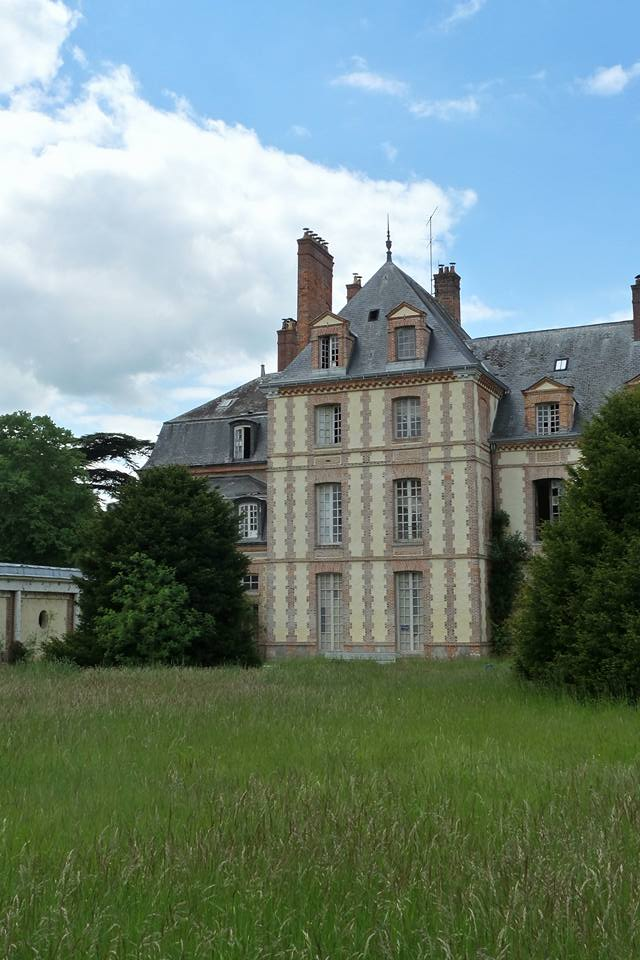

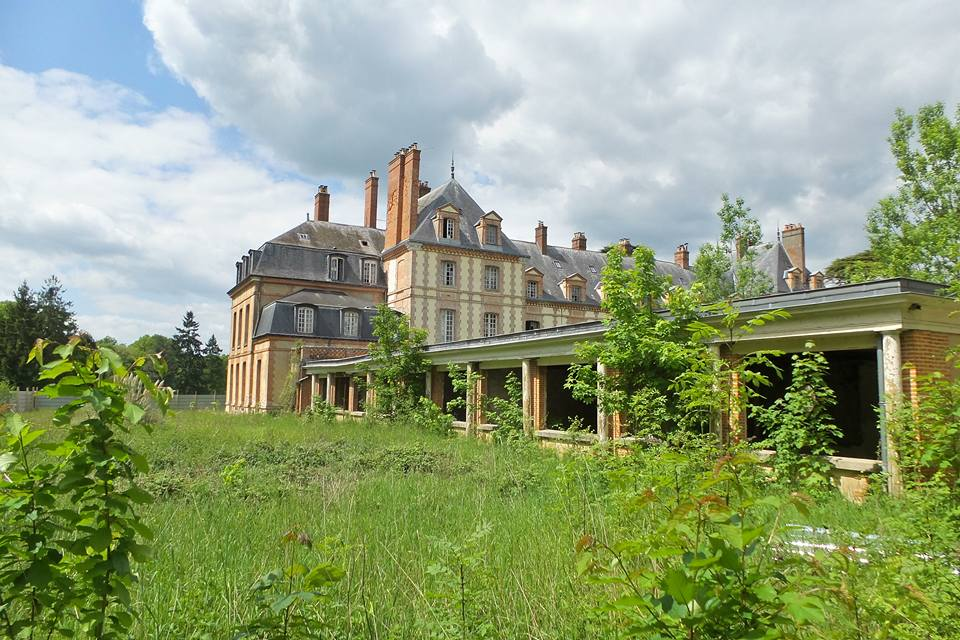

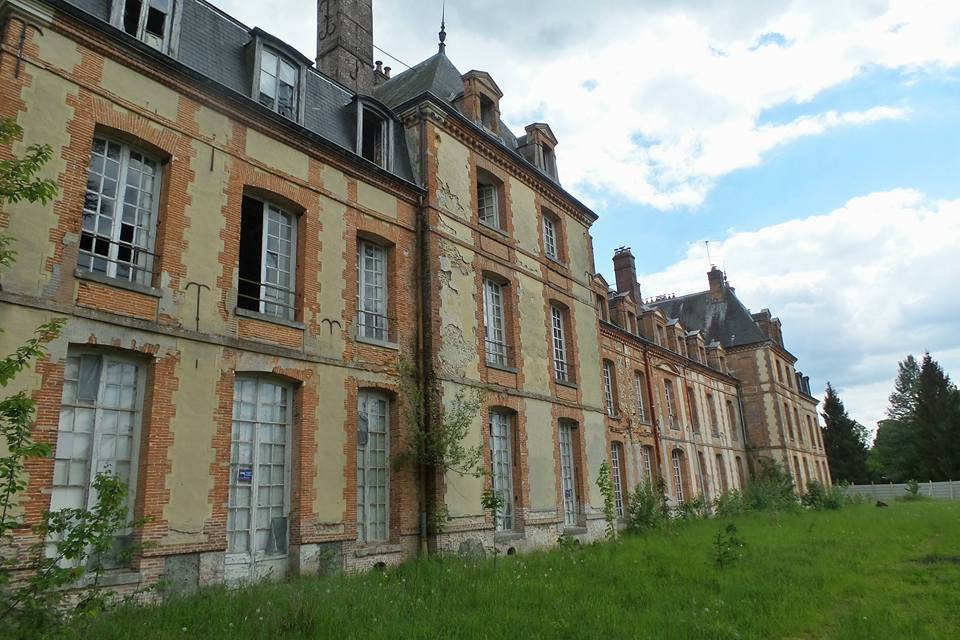

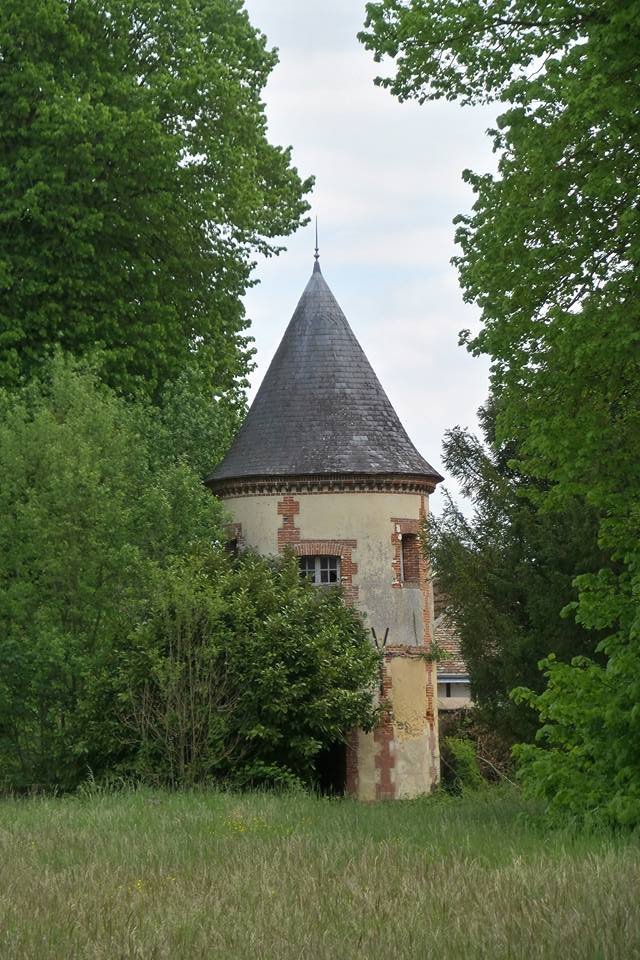

== See also ==
- List of châteaux in Eure-et-Loir
