= Jacques François de Pérusse des Cars =

French Navy officer of the War of American Independence

- Born: November 1738; Château des Cars
- Died: April 12, 1782 (aged 43); Glorieux
- Spouse: Louis-Félicité Buttet
- Relatives: Jean-François de Pérusse des Cars (brother); James FitzJames, 1st Duke of Berwick (grandfather)
- Military career
- Allegiance: Kingdom of France
- Branch: French Navy
- Rank: Captain
- Commands: Zéphyr
- Conflicts: Battle of the Saintes
- Awards: Chevalier of the Order of Saint Louis

Jacques François de Pérusse des Cars (Note: Sometimes spelt "Pérusse d'Escars".) (November 1738 – 12 April 1782) was a French Navy officer who was a great-grandson of King James II of England. He served in the War of American Independence.

== Early life ==
Pérusse des Cars was born at the Château des Cars in November 1738. He was the second son of four children born to Marie Emilie FitzJames (1715–1770), a Lady-in-Waiting to Queen Marie (the wife of King Louis XV), and Lt.-Gen. François Marie de Pérusse des Cars (1709–1759), Comte des Cars e Marquis de Pranzac. Among his siblings was elder brother, Louis François Marie de Perusse des Cars, Marquis de Pranzac, and younger brother, Jean-François de Pérusse des Cars, 1st Duc des Cars. His only sister, Françoise Émilie de Pérusse des Cars, was the wife of Armand de Montmartel, Marquis de Brunoy (son of the financier Jean Pâris de Monmartel).

His paternal grandparents were Louis François de Pérusse des Cars, Comte des Cars and Marquis de Pranzac, and the former Marie-Françoise-Victoire de Verthamon. His uncle was Louis-Nicolas de Pérusse des Cars, Marquis des Cars (father of François-Nicolas-René de Pérusse des Cars, Comte des Cars and grandfather of Amédée de Pérusse des Cars, 2nd Duc de Cars). His maternal grandfather was Marshal James FitzJames, 1st Duke of Berwick (an illegitimate son of King James II), the Anglo-French military leader under King Louis XIV. His maternal grandmother was Anne Bulkeley (daughter of Hon. Henry Bulkeley, Master of the Household to James II).

== Career ==
He joined the Navy as a Garde-Marine in 1754. He was promoted to Ensign in 1757 and to Lieutenant in 1765. In 1772, he was given command of the 32-gun frigate Zéphyr, Brest.

He was promoted to Captain in April 1777. In 1780, he captained the frigate Prudente, cruising from Saint-Servan to Saint-Malo, Cherbourg and Brest. After Prudente was in battle, Des Cars had an interview with Louis XVI. On 22 June 1779, Prudente was captured by the 64-gun HMS Ruby and HMS Aeolus.

In March 1781, he was promoted to the command of the 74-gun Glorieux, in the squadron under De Grasse. Des Cars placed himself on a shroud of his ship to better direct the battle. In the opening of the Battle of the Saintes, at 9 am, he was wounded by a musket ball, and had to climb down to the deck, where he continued to command. He was then mortally wounded by a large-calibre musket ball, and died shortly afterwards on 12 April 1782. Lt. Trogoff de Kerlessy assumed command. Des Cars' defence of Glorieux was later lauded in the subsequent inquiry into the battle.

== Personal life ==
Des Cars had married Louis-Félicité Buttet in Saint-Domingue. Together, they were the parents of:

- Amédée Louis Jacques de Perusse des Cars (1778–1779), who died in infancy.

He was a Knight in the Order of Saint Louis.

== Sources and references ==
Notes

Citations

Bibliography

- Contenson, Ludovic (1934). La Société des Cincinnati de France et la guerre d'Amérique (1778–1783). Paris: éditions Auguste Picard. OCLC 7842336.
- Gardiner, Asa Bird (1905). The order of the Cincinnati in France. The Rhode Island state society of Cincinnati. OCLC 5104049.
- Lacour-Gayet, Georges (1910). La marine militaire de la France sous le règne de Louis XVI. Paris: Honoré Champion. OCLC 763372623.
- La Monneraye, Pierre-Bruno-Jean (1998). Bonnichon, Philippe (ed.). Souvenirs de 1760 à 1791. Librairie Droz. ISBN 978-2-7453-0079-9. OCLC 165892922.
- Troude, Onésime-Joachim (1867). Batailles navales de la France (in French). Vol. 2. Challamel ainé. OCLC 836362484.
- Roche, Jean-Michel (2005). Dictionnaire des bâtiments de la flotte de guerre française de Colbert à nos jours. Vol. 1. Group Retozel-Maury Millau. ISBN 978-2-9525917-0-6. OCLC 165892922.

External links

- Archives nationales (2011). "Fonds Marine, sous-série B/4: Campagnes, 1571-1785" (PDF).
