= Charles-Élie de Ferrières =

French politician

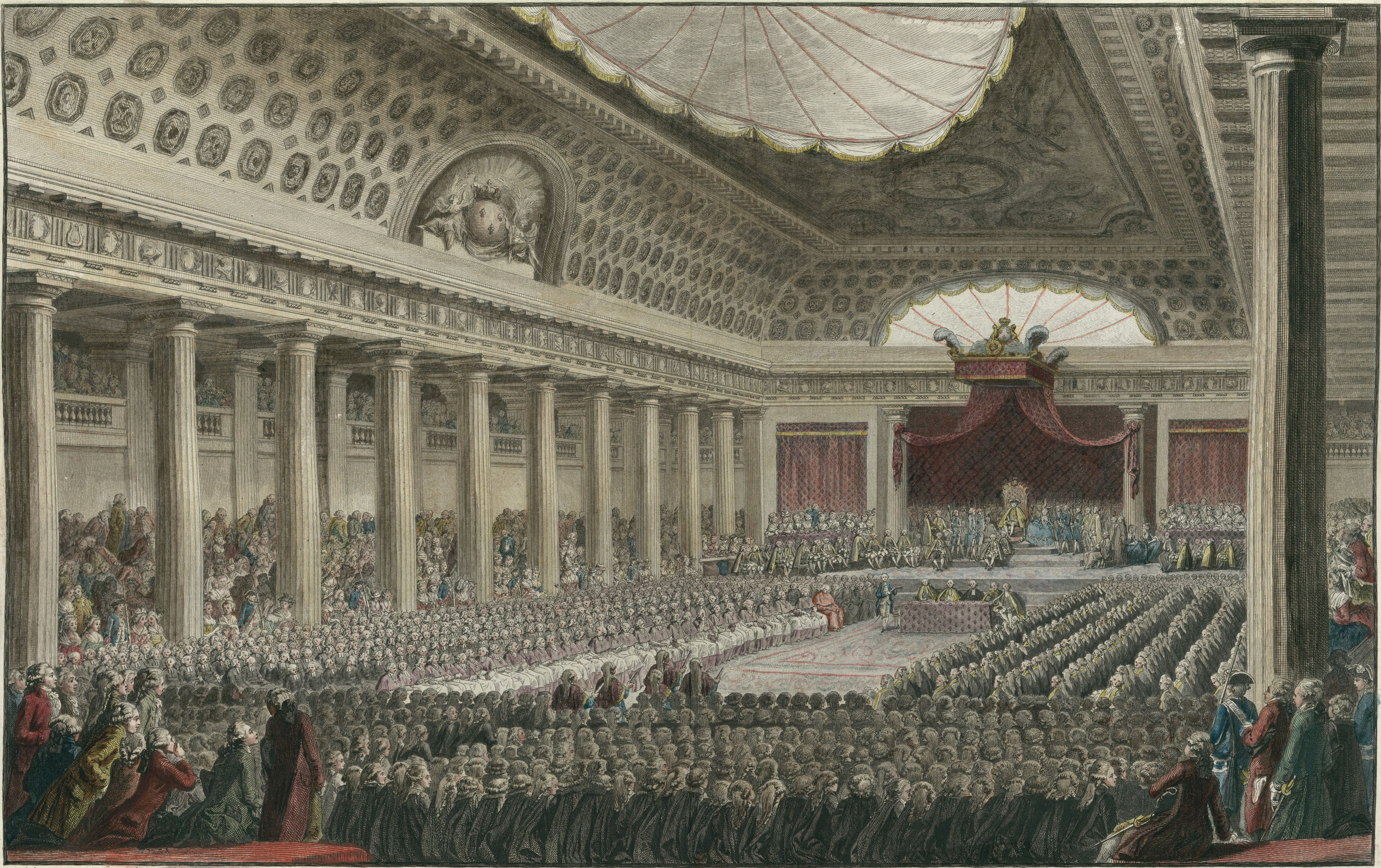
Opening of the Estates General on May 5, 1789 in the Grands Salles des Menus-Plaisirs in Versailles.

Charles-Élie de Ferrières (1741 – 30 July 1804) was a French nobleman and writer who lived throughout the French Revolution and the early years of Napoleon's reign. He was present as a deputy at the Estates General of 1789, representing the nobility of Saumur. He was also the general councilor of Vienne. He was a liberal aristocrat, given that he opposed the noble obstructionism in the Estates-General and wrote positively of the Revolution.

He published multiple works:

- In 1785, Le Théisme, ou Introduction générale à l'étude de la religion (Theism, or General Introduction to the Study of Religion)
- In 1788 and in two volumes, La Femme et les vœux (The Woman and the Vows)
- In 1791 and in four volumes, Saint-Flour et Justine, ou Histoire d'une jeune français du xviii^{e} siècle (Saint-Flour and Justine, or History of a young French woman of the 18th century)
- In 1789 and three volumes, Mémoires pour servir à l'histoire de l'Assemblée constituante et de la révolution de 1789 (Memoirs to serve the history of the Constituent Assembly and the revolution of 1789)
- In 1799, De l'État des lettres dans le Poitou, depuis l'an 300 de l'ère chrétienne jusqu'à l'année 1789. Lu au lycée des sciences et des arts établi à Poitiers (From the State of Letters in Poitou, from the year 300 of the Christian era until the year 1789. Read at the 'lycée des sciences et des arts' established in Poitiers)
- In 1821 and 1822, Mémoires du marquis de Ferrières, avec une notice sur sa vie, des notes et des éclaircissemens historiques (Memoirs of the Marquis de Ferrières, with a note on his life, notes, and historical clarifications)

== Notes and references ==
- Robert, Adolphe; Bourloton, Edgar (2012). Dictionnaire Des Parlementaires Français [Dictionary of French Parliamentarians]. Nabu Press.
