= Abondant =

- Commune
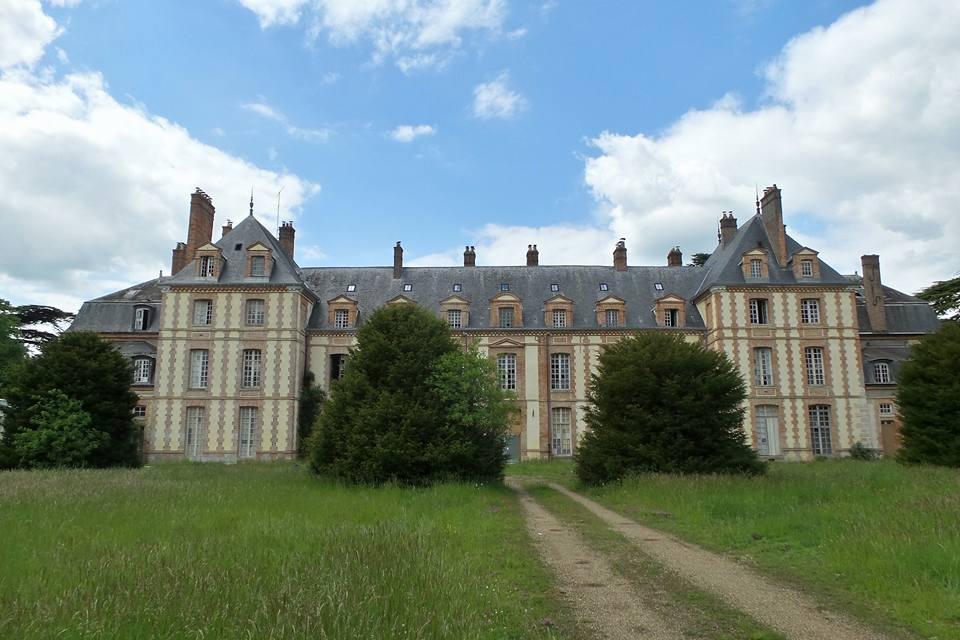
- Château d'Abondant
- Location of Abondant
- Location within France Location within Centre-Val de Loire
- Coordinates: 48°47′N 1°26′E
- Country: France
- Region: Centre-Val de Loire
- Department: Eure-et-Loir
- Arrondissement: Dreux
- Canton: Anet
- Intercommunality: CA Pays de Dreux

Government
  - Mayor (2020–2026): Virginie Quentin
- Area^{1}: 34.8 km^{2} (13.4 sq mi)
- Elevation: 137 m (449 ft)
- Highest elevation: 141 m (463 ft)
- Lowest elevation: 69 m (226 ft)
- Population (2023): 2,434
  - Density: 69.9/km^{2} (181/sq mi)
- Demonym(s): Abondantais, Abondantaises
- Time zone: UTC+01:00 (CET)
  - Summer (DST): UTC+02:00 (CEST)
- INSEE/Postal code: 28001 /28410
- ^{1} French Land Register data, which excludes lakes, ponds, glaciers > 1 km^{2} (0.386 sq mi or 247 acres) and river estuaries.

Abondant (French pronunciation: [abɔ̃dɑ̃]) is a commune in the Eure-et-Loir department in northern France.

== History ==
It is located 10 km north east of Dreux on the D147 road. The Avre aqueduct passes to the north of the commune. The Château d'Abondant dates from the reign of Louis XIII and is now a care home. It was previously owned by banker Henry Herman Harjes, Baron Jules de Koenigswarter and his wife, the former Pannonica Rothschild.

== Population ==
Historical population

Year	Pop.	±% p.a.
1793	1,137	—
1800	1,176	+0.48%
1806	1,217	+0.57%
1821	1,144	−0.41%
1831	1,140	−0.04%
1836	1,146	+0.11%
1841	1,132	−0.25%
1846	1,180	+0.83%
1851	1,185	+0.08%
1856	1,067	−2.08%
1861	933	−2.65%
1866	921	−0.26%
1872	868	−0.98%
1876	879	+0.32%
1881	821	−1.36%
1886	809	−0.29%
1891	916	+2.52%
1896	744	−4.07%
1901	724	−0.54%

Year	Pop.	±% p.a.
1906	724	+0.00%
1911	728	+0.11%
1921	622	−1.56%
1926	678	+1.74%
1931	676	−0.06%
1936	616	−1.84%
1946	728	+1.68%
1954	747	+0.32%
1962	751	+0.07%
1968	815	+1.37%
1975	1,017	+3.21%
1982	1,314	+3.73%
1990	1,494	+1.62%
1999	1,742	+1.72%
2007	2,010	+1.80%
2012	2,221	+2.02%
2017	2,372	+1.32%
2023	2,434	+0.43%

Source: EHESS (1793-1999) and INSEE

== See also ==
- Communes of the Eure-et-Loir department
