= Pierre Louis Jean Casimir de Blacas =

French noble, antiquarian and diplomat (1771–1839)

The Duke of Blacas Peer of France, OSE, LH, OSM
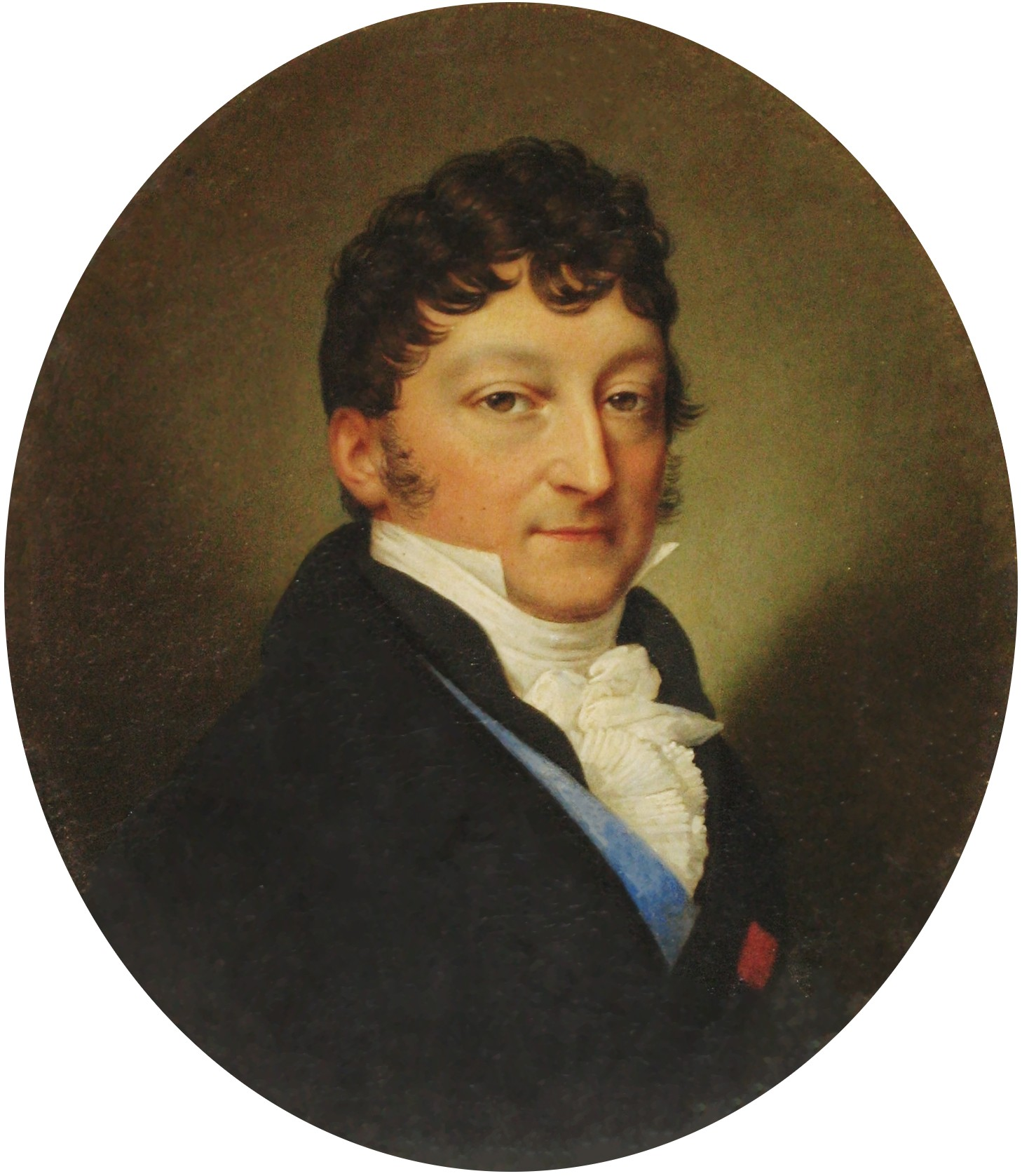

France Ambassador to the Holy See
- In office 11 June 1817 – 16 September 1824
- Appointed by: Louis XVIII

France Ambassador to the Two Sicilies
- In office 8 July 1815 – 11 June 1817
- Appointed by: Louis XVIII

Chief Minister of France
- In office 2 May 1814 – 8 July 1815
- Monarch: Louis XVIII
- Preceded by: The Prince of Talleyrand
- Succeeded by: Office abolished and replaced by Prime Minister's office

Minister for the King's Household
- In office 4 June 1811 – 8 July 1815
- Monarch: Louis XVIII
- Preceded by: The Duke of Avaray
- Succeeded by: Office vacant Jacques Lauriston (1820)

Personal details
- Born: 20 January 1771 Avignon, Comtat Venaissin, Papal enclave in France
- Died: 17 November 1839 (aged 68) Vienna, Austria
- Party: Ultra-royalist
- Spouse(s): Henriette du Bouchet de Sourches, Countess of Montsoreau (m. 1814–1839)
- Children: Louis, Duke of Blacas
- Profession: Military officer, diplomat, antiquarian

Military service
- Branch/service: (Kingdom of France) French Royal Army
- Years of service: 1790–1814
- Rank: Maréchal de camp Second lieutenant
- Unit: Army of Condé (1791–1801); 15th Dragoon Regiment (1790–1791)
- Battles/wars: French Revolutionary Wars; War of the Second Coalition; Hundred Days

Pierre-Louis Jean Casimir, Count of Blacas d'Aulps (10 January 1771 – 17 November 1839), later created 1st Duke of Blacas (1821), was a French antiquarian, nobleman and diplomat during the Bourbon Restoration.

== Biography ==
=== Early life ===
He was baptized at Avignon on 11 January 1771. He was the son of an aristocrat from Provence and took an opposing view of the French Revolution. In 1790, while a sous-lieutenant in the Noailles dragoons from Tarn, he fled across the Var to Nice in the Kingdom of Sardinia. From there, he went to the German frontier town of Coblenz and joined the counter-revolutionary émigré army of Louis XVI's cousin, the Prince of Condé. Later, he went through Italy before entering the service of Russia and fighting the French Republic in Switzerland under Alexander Suvorov.

=== Serving the Bourbons ===
While in the pay of Austria, he then travelled to Warsaw and rejoined the court-in-exile of the pretender to the throne of France, King Louis XVI's younger brother, the Comte de Provence, who charged him with various missions, including one to Saint Petersburg. Despite the help of Joseph de Maistre, the King of Sardinia's diplomatic envoy to the court of the Russian tsar Alexander I, he was only able to gain small advantages for the future king. However, his willingness to do anything for the exiled prince, quickly gained Blacas the trust and confidence of his royal master. In 1809, Blacas was made the pretender's grandmaster of the wardrobe (grand-maître de la Garde-Robe du Roi). After the death of the Comte d'Avaray in 1811, he became Provence's closest advisor and favorite.

On 22 April 1814, he married a fellow exile, Henriette Marie Félicité du Bouchet de Sourches de Montsoreau, in London. She had been born in Paris on 20 February 1780 to Yves Marie du Bouchet de Sourches, Comte de Montsoreau, a maréchal de camp (major general) then lieutenant général during the Ancien Régime, and his wife Marie Charlotte Lallemand de Nantouillet. The Comte de Montsoreau was the nephew of the Marquise de Tourzel, the royal governess to the children of King Louis XVI of France and his wife, Queen Marie Antoinette, during the French Revolution.

=== After Restoration ===
When the Comte de Provence became the actual king of France after the defeat and abdication of Napoleon I in 1814, Blacas was appointed to the position of minister in charge of the royal household (ministre de la Maison du Roi) in the government of the first Bourbon restoration and given the rank of maréchal de camp (major general). He assumed a dominant role in the new king's Conseil du Roi, essentially acting as prime minister. But, unskilled, he made an assortment of errors, favoring members of the Ancien Régime too often. In addition, his cool and aloof behavior alienated many.

On Napoleon's return from Elba, Blacas accompanied the new king on his flight to Ghent. Upon the king's return to Paris after the Battle of Waterloo, though, Blacas' unpopularity led to his dismissal. In compensation, he was named a peer of France with the title of Comte de Blacas d'Aulps. Soon, however, his place as royal advisor was taken over by the more moderate Élie Decazes.

=== Diplomatic service in Italy ===
A scapegoat for the royalist excesses of 1814, Blacas was unofficially exiled as the French ambassador to the court of the Kingdom of Two Sicilies, whose capital was located in Naples. There, he negotiated the 1816 marriage of the Louis XVIII's nephew, the Duke of Berry, to Francis I of the Two Sicilies's daughter Caroline. Also in 1816, Blacas became a member of both the Académie des Inscriptions et Belles-Lettres and the Académie des Beaux-Arts. Afterwards, he was appointed to be the French ambassador to the Holy See in Rome. He signed a concordat between Bourbon France and Pope Pius VII on 11 June 1817. In 1820, he received the Ordre du Saint-Esprit. While still ambassador in Rome, he was one of three French representatives to the Congress of Laibach in 1821.

Remaining in Rome for many years, he provided the French artist Jean Auguste Dominique Ingres in 1817 with his first official commission since 1814 and became a patron to the German classicist Theodor Panofka, who returned with him to Paris in 1828. In addition, he worked closely with Italian archaeologist Carlo Fea in the excavation of the Roman Forum. Together, they correctly identified the Temple of Castor and Pollux in 1816.

== Return in France and final years ==
Louis XVIII raised his title of comte (Count) to that of Duke of Blacas (Duc de Blacas) on 30 April 1821. After his death, the new king, Charles X, chose him to be one of his premier gentilhommes de la chambre. Blacas was also appointed superintendent to the Crown properties (intendant général des Bâtiments de la Couronne). During his administration, he supported orientalist Jean-François Champollion and created the "Musée Egyptien" within the Louvre. In his lifetime, Blacas amassed a rich antiquities collection that Joseph Toussaint Reinaud described in part under the title "Description des monuments musulmans du cabinet du duc de Blacas" (Description of the Muslim objects in the cabinet of the Duke of Blacas) in 1828. In 1866, his descendants sold most of his remaining collection to the British Museum, where it is still today.

In 1830, Blacas followed the Bourbons into exile. Later, he was instrumental in the dismissal of the Duchess of Gontaut as the governess to the king's grandchildren in fear of her relatively liberal political views. In 1838, he was created Fürst von Blacas d'Aulps (Prince of Blacas and Aulps) by the Emperor of Austria on 16 May 1837. He died on 17 November 1839 and was buried next to the Bourbon crypt of the Kostanjevica Monastery in Görz, Austria, now on the Slovenian side of the border in Nova Gorica. His wife died in Paris on 10 October 1856.

He was succeeded as Duke of Blacas by his son Louis, who was also both an antiquarian and a Legitimist.
