= Louis, Duke of Blacas =

Louis de Blacas d'Aulps, 2nd Duke of Blacas

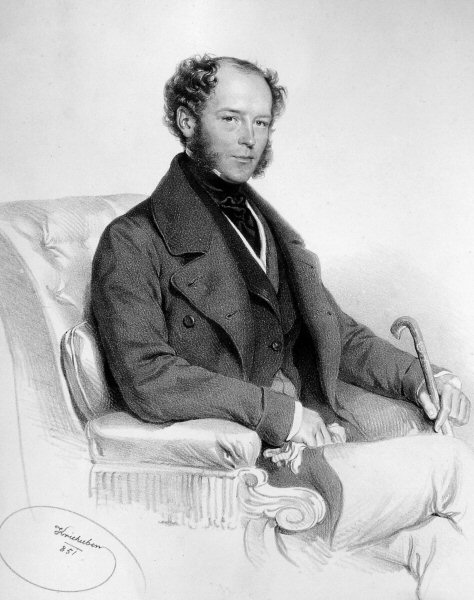
Louis Charles de Blacas d´Áulps, Lithograph by Josef Kriehuber, 1851

Louis Charles Pierre Casimir de Blacas d'Aulps, 2nd Duke of Blacas, 2nd Prince of Blacas (15 April 1815, London – 10 February 1866, Venice) was a French nobleman and antiquarian.

== Early life ==
He was born in London on 15 April 1815 during the Hundred Days, as the elder son of Pierre-Louis de Blacas d'Aulps, 1st Duke of Blacas and his wife, Henriette-Marie-Félicité du Bouchet de Sourches de Montsoreau (1780-1856). His godfather was Louis XVIII, King of France.

== Career ==
Louis was educated first in France and then in Austria where his father had followed the exiled royal family in 1836. He returned in France only in 1844. He became an antiquarian like his father, inheriting and expanding his father's extraordinary collection of Greek vases, engraved gems and antique coins, cameos (including the famous Blacas Cameo of Augustus) and jewels. He was particularly interested in numismatics. He translated into French, under the title Histoire de la monnaie romaine (Paris 1866), the Geschichte des Römischen Münzwesens (History of Roman Coinage) of Theodor Mommsen (Berlin 1860), with additional notes signed B. The book is still often quoted using the Blacas translation rather than the original German version. Blacas was a member of the Societé des Antiquaires de France and served as its secretary from 1864 to 1865.

After his father's death, Blacas defended him against allegations of unscrupulous gains made by the Duke of Ragusa. He fully supported his father's political views. Like his father, he was an ardent Legitimist. He succeeded him as a premier gentilhomme de la chambre to the exiled Legitimist claimant, the duc d'Angoulême. Blacas was a devoted follower of the duc d'Angoulême's successor, the comte de Chambord, whom he had known since childhood and whom he served all his life. His brother, Count Xavier de Blacas d'Aulps (1819-1876), served the comte similarly. However, contrary to his father and to his own son (who later served as mayor and deputy), Blacas did not directly take part in the political life of the Second Empire.

After the French government refused to pay for its acquisition, his collection was sold by his heirs to the British Museum in 1867 for 1,200,000 francs.

== Personal life ==
The duke was married twice. Both wives were from Legitimist families of the French high nobility. He married first at Paris on 17 September 1845 Marie-Paule de Pérusse des Cars (3 February 1827, Paris - 18 September 1855, Pau), daughter of Amédée-François-Régis de Pérusse des Cars, 2nd Count and 1st Duke of Cars, Peer of France. They had four children:

- Casimir de Blacas d'Aulps, 3rd Duke of Blacas, 3rd Prince of Blacas (23 October 1847 – 26 July 1866, Velletri). His life was representative of the engagements of French Legitimists of the time. A devout Catholic, he enrolled at 18 in the Papal Zouaves on 9 June 1866 to take part in the defense of the Papal States and went to Italy, but he died there from Typhoid the following month. He had been Duke only five months.
- Louise-Henriette-Marie (7 July 1849, Abondant - 3 February 1934, Paris), married in Paris on 10 April 1872 with Count René Hurault de Vibraye (6 October 1842, Paris - 20 December 1907, Paris).
- Marie-Augustine-Yvonne de Blacas d’Aulps (1 January 1851 – 21 Octobre 1881, Aressel, Austria), married on 14 June 1870 in Paris to Alexander, 4th Prince of Sayn-Wittgenstein-Sayn (14 July 1847, Paris - 12 August 1940, Hachenburg).
- Pierre de Blacas d'Aulps, 4th Duke of Blacas, 4th Prince of Blacas (27 May 1853, Paris – 13 December 1937 Beaupréau), succeeded his brother as Duke. He married on 30 August 1884 Honorine de Durfort-Civrac (26 November 1855 Beaupréau - 1 June 1920 Beaupréau), daughter of Marie-Henri-Louis de Durfort, 2d Marquis of Civrac (a cadet branch of Dukes of Lorge) and had posterity.

On 28 July 1863, the Duke remarried with Alix-Laurence-Marie de Damas (1824–1879), daughter of Ange-Hyacinthe de Damas de Cormaillon, 1st Baron of Damas, Peer of France, who had been Minister of foreign affairs (1823–1828) and Minister of war (1823–1824) of Charles X. They had only one daughter:

- Marie-Thérèse de Blacas d'Aulps (22 July 1864, Verignon – 8 February 1959, Aups).

He died in Venice at the Palazzo Cavalli, the residence of the comte de Chambord, after planning a study of Venetian coinage. His body was taken back to Aups where his funeral took place.
