= Château de Beauvais (Lussas-et-Nontronneau) =

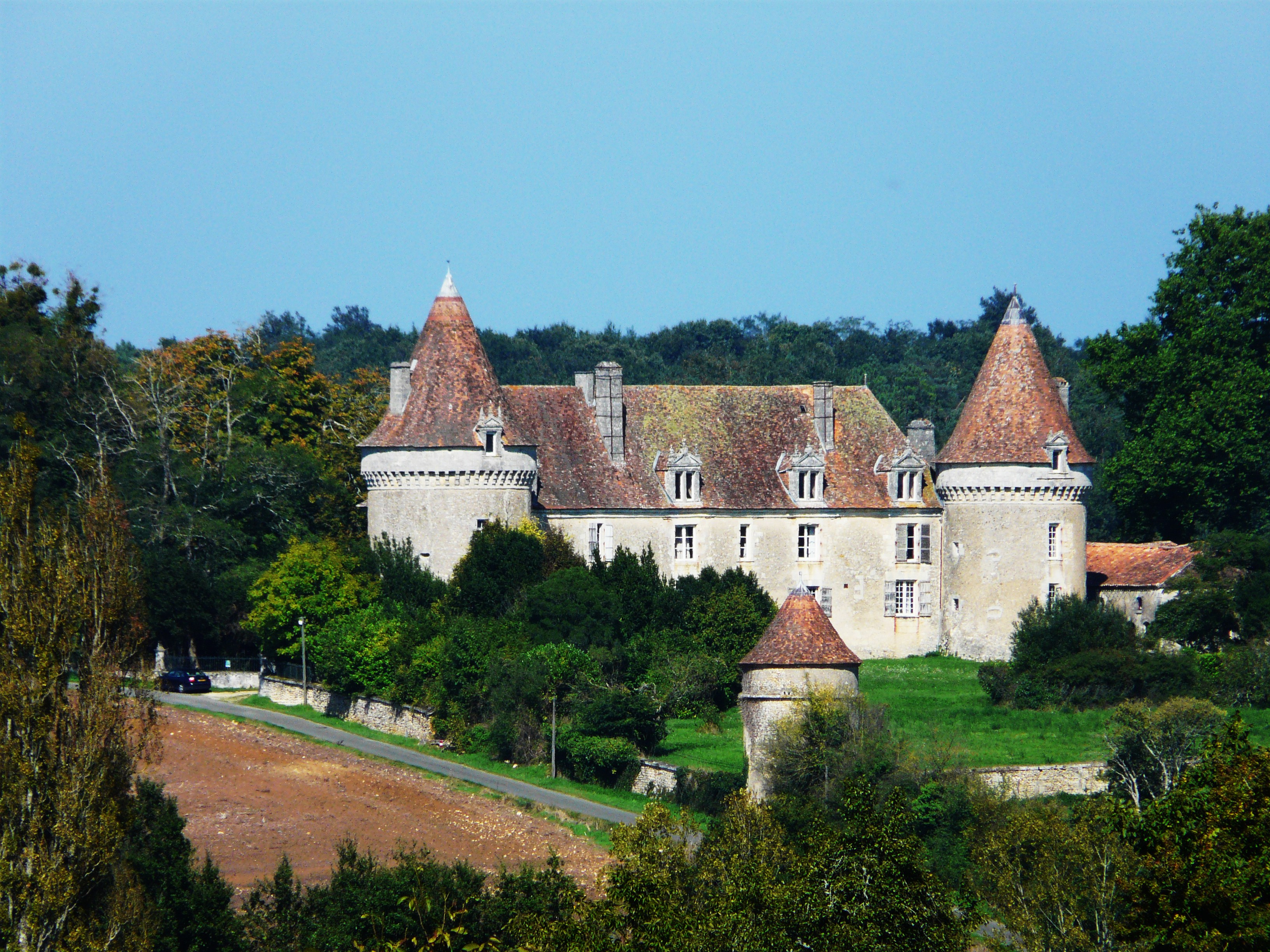
- Interactive map of the Château de Beauvais area

General information
- Status: Preserved
- Location: Lussas-et-Nontronneau, France
- Coordinates: 45°30′42″N 0°35′23″E
- Construction started: 19th century
- Inaugurated: Famille du Faure de La Roderie

The Castle of Beauvais (French:Château de Beauvais) is a French château located in the municipality of Lussas-et-Nontronneau, department of Dordogne, region of Nouvelle-Aquitaine, France. The castle was listed as a historic monument on 19 December 1973.

== Design ==
The Château de Beauvais is a large rectangular-shaped building flanked by two round towers with battlements. It overlooks the narrow valley that separates it from the town of Lussas. It stands as a fine example of archaic architecture of the region.

== History ==
The family of Faure La Roderie initiated construction of the castle in 1533. it was definitely finished within 20 years. The land in era of the Middle Ages belonged to the family of Mareuil. Daisy Mareuil brought these lands in the fifteenth century, along with John of Authon, cupbearer of the Duke of Guyenne.

The land of Beauvais and the noble den of Belvès were owned by Thibaud Conan and his wife Agnes Maumont, daughter of Jean de Maumont Lord Connezac.

His nephew, Joachim Conan (son of Thibaud and Catherine Geraud) is coseigneur Connezac and Beauvais. He had managed to escape the family Faure land of his ancestors to move to another place, which he would build his main residence.

Joachim and his wife Dexmier produced ill have a son and seven daughters, but none of them hold the title of Lord of Beauvais. The lands were passed around a bit.

The son died childless and bequeathed Beauvais, Lussas, Fontroubade to the eldest son of his brother Gerald Francis of Faure of Roderie, Baron of Saint Martial de Valette, known by the titles of Gentleman of the Chambre du Roy, Mestre Camp and Chevalier of the Orders, husband of Judith Filhet the Quarry.

On the death of Alain Faure, the castle of Beauvais returns to his widow Catherine des Cars, Countess of Beauvais, Lussas and Fontroubade. The latter was the daughter of the powerful François des Cars, Caubon Baron, Count des Cars and Françoise Veyrières Lady of Renaudie. Catherine remarried on 9 February 1652 to Pierre de Bonneval, Vicomte de Château Rocher and finally on 11 June 1663 to Jean de Rochechouart, Building Vicomte.

She died in Beauvais om 3 May 1694 after it was given in 1692 to his brother Annet, Marquis des Cars of all his property. This was a Knight of Malta, Governor of Honfleur then Knight of Honour HRH Anne Marie Louise d'Orléans, daughter of Gaston de France. He left Paule Montlezun of Thomas, Marquis des Cars, lord of Beauvais and other places, husband of Mary Magdalene Crussol d'Uzes (daughter of Nicolas Fouquet in Vaux, the famous minister of Louis XIV).

After family arrangements, Beauvais passes Catherine's niece Cars, Gabrielle des Cars, sister of Thomas. She married 4 November 1726 to Jacques de la Font of John, Marquis of St. Project, Vicomte de Lavedan, Bailiff and Seneschal of Upper Auvergne. She died April 3, 1760, at the age of 80 and was buried in the chapel of Beauvais adjoining the parish church of Lussas.

She had left Beauvais at the Marquis Charles de Ramiere Puycharnaud Lord, and his son Louis-Gabriel Count of Ramière. This was his nephew and godson. He married in 1763 Marie Antoinette du Lau, daughter of the Marquis of Allemans. To prepare for marriage, Beauvais was transferred.

Charles of Ramière and Louis-Gabriel of Ramière sell for part and exchange against the barony of Monteresse for another 6 May and 27 October 1762, Beauvais, Lussas and Fontroubade to Sir Arnaud Souc the floor, Knight Garélie and the Rousselière and his wife Lady Mary Magdalene Cheyrade of Montbron, Baroness of Monteresse and daughter of the powerful Adrien Étienne-de Cheyrade, Comte de Montbron and Marquis de Clairvaux, and Lady Louise Deval.

Their son Jean-Joseph Souc the floor of the Garélie continue the many interiors of Beauvais. This last wife Marguerite Nordens-Kult Palme. They will sell in 1814.

Mr. Gabriel Raynaud and his sister Marguerite purchase the domain a part in life. The death of his brother in 1820, Miss Raynaud inherits half from her brother.

It will sell in 1829 in Beauvais Mr. Nicolas Grand Duchazaud, husband of Martial Forestier.

Their son remained single sells Beauvais in 1872 to Robin Alexander, cognac merchant, whose family lawyers is from Nontron Angouleme. This single fact inherit his nephew André Callandreau in 1905 itself nephew Octavian Callandreau. Single also is his niece Marie Hériard, who remained childless when she inherited the castle in 1964.

The current owners are descended from families of Mareuil, Authon, Flamenc, Conan, the Faure of Lussas of Perusse des Cars, the Ramière, Robin, and Callandreau Hériard.

== Historical figures who lived or stayed in Beauvais ==
=== Thibaut de Conan ===
Pierre Faure said the BAILHOT, iron merchant of the city of Nontron, acquired in 1501, of noble Antoine Authon Bernardières of the whole parish and Fontroubade Lussas. Jean Faure said BAILHOT, Lord of Lussas, Fontroubade her son, husband of Helen of Puysilhon. His sister Catherine, wife of Antoine Chapel Jumilhac, titled Baron Jumilhac in 1597, after making a big financial help to Henri IV. John his son, lord of the haunt of Beauvais, married in 1533 to Mary of Saint Martin de la Forge Chapel St Robert. He gave his noble den of Beauvais to the Jean Faure, his nephew. Dies without children. Jean du Faure, lord of Roderie, Advisor at the Court of Aids in Bordeaux. Husband of Antoinette de Pontac, died about 1578 without children. Pierre Faure said the lord of Lussas BAILHOT to Fontroubade and Beauvais, mayor of Périgueux in 1546, husband of Jeanne Proulhac. Geraud of Faure of Roderie, Roche Pontissac son of Dauphin, adviser to the election and Périgueux Bertrande Proulhac. Receiver Size for Perigord, he was elected Mayor of Périgueux in 1575, when the city was taken by the Huguenots. Puy Mary Consort in 1562. The latter was accused of culpable negligence, conniving with his cousin François du Faure, coseigneur Lussas. Gentleman of the Company of the King of Navarre. Governor of Bergerac. He played a major role in decision Périgueux and religious wars. He married Nolette River, Savinien Cyrano's sister, lord of the River, grandfather of the famous poet, philosopher Savivien II Cyrano de Bergherac, immortalized in 1897 by the famous heroic comedy in verse by Edmond Rostand: Cyrano de Bergerac. Guy Faure of his brother Squire was first King of Navarre, captain of the castle of Bergerac. François Faure of the Roderie, Saint Martial baron; Camp Mestre ten signs of foot. Gentleman of the King's Chamber. He made his will in Beauvais in 1620, wishing to be buried in the church of Lussas. He married Judith Filhet the Quarry in 1581 in Tours. He had at least two son François and Alain. François Faure of the Roderie, gentleman of the King's Chamber, Captain Regiment of his guards. He married Anne of Gyves. Widowed in 1631, she became Antoine Aguesseau wife, first President of the Parliament of Bordeaux. Alain Faure of the Roderie baptized in Nontron August 8, 1596, Sieur de Beauvais, residing in the Rousselière, married in 1629 Catherine of Cars.

=== Faure family 15-17th centuries ===
Pierre Faure said the BAILHOT, iron merchant of the city of Nontron, acquired in 1501, of noble Antoine Authon Bernardières of the whole parish and Fontroubade Lussas. Jean Faure said BAILHOT, Lord of Lussas, Fontroubade her son, husband of Helen of Puysilhon. His sister Catherine, wife of Antoine Chapel Jumilhac, titled Baron Jumilhac in 1597, after making a big financial help to Henri IV. John his son, lord of the haunt of Beauvais, married in 1533 to Mary of Saint Martin de la Forge Chapel St Robert. He gave his noble den of Beauvais to the Jean Faure, his nephew. Dies without children. Jean du Faure, lord of Roderie, Advisor at the Court of Aids in Bordeaux. Husband of Antoinette de Pontac, died about 1578 without children. Pierre Faure said the lord of Lussas BAILHOT to Fontroubade and Beauvais, mayor of Périgueux in 1546, husband of Jeanne Proulhac. Geraud of Faure of Roderie, Roche Pontissac son of Dauphin, adviser to the election and Périgueux Bertrande Proulhac. Receiver Size for Perigord, he was elected Mayor of Périgueux in 1575, when the city was taken by the Huguenots. Puy Mary Consort in 1562. The latter was accused of culpable negligence, conniving with his cousin François du Faure, coseigneur Lussas. Gentleman of the Company of the King of Navarre. Governor of Bergerac. He played a major role in decision Périgueux and religious wars. He married Nolette River, Savinien Cyrano's sister, lord of the River, grandfather of the famous poet, philosopher Savivien II Cyrano de Bergherac, immortalized in 1897 by the famous heroic comedy in verse by Edmond Rostand: Cyrano de Bergerac. Guy Faure of his brother Squire was first King of Navarre, captain of the castle of Bergerac. François Faure of the Roderie, Saint Martial baron; Camp Mestre ten signs of foot. Gentleman of the King's Chamber. He made his will in Beauvais in 1620, wishing to be buried in the church of Lussas. He married Judith Filhet the Quarry in 1581 in Tours. He had at least two son François and Alain. François Faure of the Roderie, gentleman of the King's Chamber, Captain Regiment of his guards. He married Anne of Gyves. Widowed in 1631, she became Antoine Aguesseau wife, first President of the Parliament of Bordeaux. Alain Faure of the Roderie baptized in Nontron on 8 August 1596, Sieur de Beauvais, residing in the Rousselière, married in 1629 Catherine of Cars.

=== Fillet family-16th -17th centuries ===
Judith Filhet of Curée wife (marriage 21 July 1581 in Tours) Francois Faure of the Roderie, gentleman of the King's Chamber, Baron of Saint Martial, Mestre Camp ten signs of foot. She died in Nontron 27 January 1638. Judith, called Mademoiselle de la Roche Turpin, was a love of poets and Anne Honoré d'Urfé, which led several poetry contests about the triumphant love. This marriage makes us discover this old family of the Quarry. Indeed, Judith was the daughter of Gilbert of the Quarry, a gentleman of the King's Chamber, Knight of the Order of the King, Lieutenant General in Vendomois. The latter was appointed by Coligny, Governor of Dieppe. He had embraced with ardor the party of the Prince of Conde.

Captured as argoulets colonel at the battle of Dreux. This is a moderate Protestant. Slaughtered on the road to Durtal by his enemies in the Vendomois, his wife and children went to the King to demand justice. His wife, Charlotte Errault, was the daughter of François Errault of Chemans, Attorney of Francis. His son, Gilbert and another brother of Judith, is no less known. Faithful friend of Henry IV (who also saved his life), Knight of the Holy Spirit. He was the first equerry of the King.

=== The Marquis de Perusse of Escars, Lords of Beauvais and Lussas: 17th and 18th centuries ===
Annet Perusse of Escars, son of Francis of Escars, Baron Caubon and Segur and Françoise Veyrières, brother of Catherine, Countess of Beauvais and Françoise, honor Queen girl. He left the Maltese cross, was lord of Aucamville, the Motte and Beauvais. Governor of Honfleur, it will be Knight of Honor SAR, Marie Louise d'Orléans (called the Grande Mademoiselle), daughter of Gaston of France, brother of Louis XIII. In his memoirs, the latter evokes several times in family members of Escars. He married in 1658 Lucretia Stuart of Vauguyon, then in 1668, Paule Montlezun. He was among other father of Catherine Escars, wife of Jacques Abzac, which will be locked a few days to Beauvais by his mother and Gabrielle Escars, Saint Marquise Project, wife of Jacques de la Font, and Grand Bailiff seneschal of the High Auvergne, who will build the chapel of Cars in the church of Lussas. Annet of Escars died in 1692.

Thomas Perusse of Escars, Marquis Escars, Lord de la Motte, Belle Serre, Beauvais, Lussas cavalry captain in the Marine regiment in 1695, he died near Toulouse in 82 years in 1758. He married in 1707 Marie Madeleine de Crussol d'Uzes (daughter of Nicolas Fouquet in Vaux, the famous minister of Louis XIV).
