= Les Cars =

- Commune
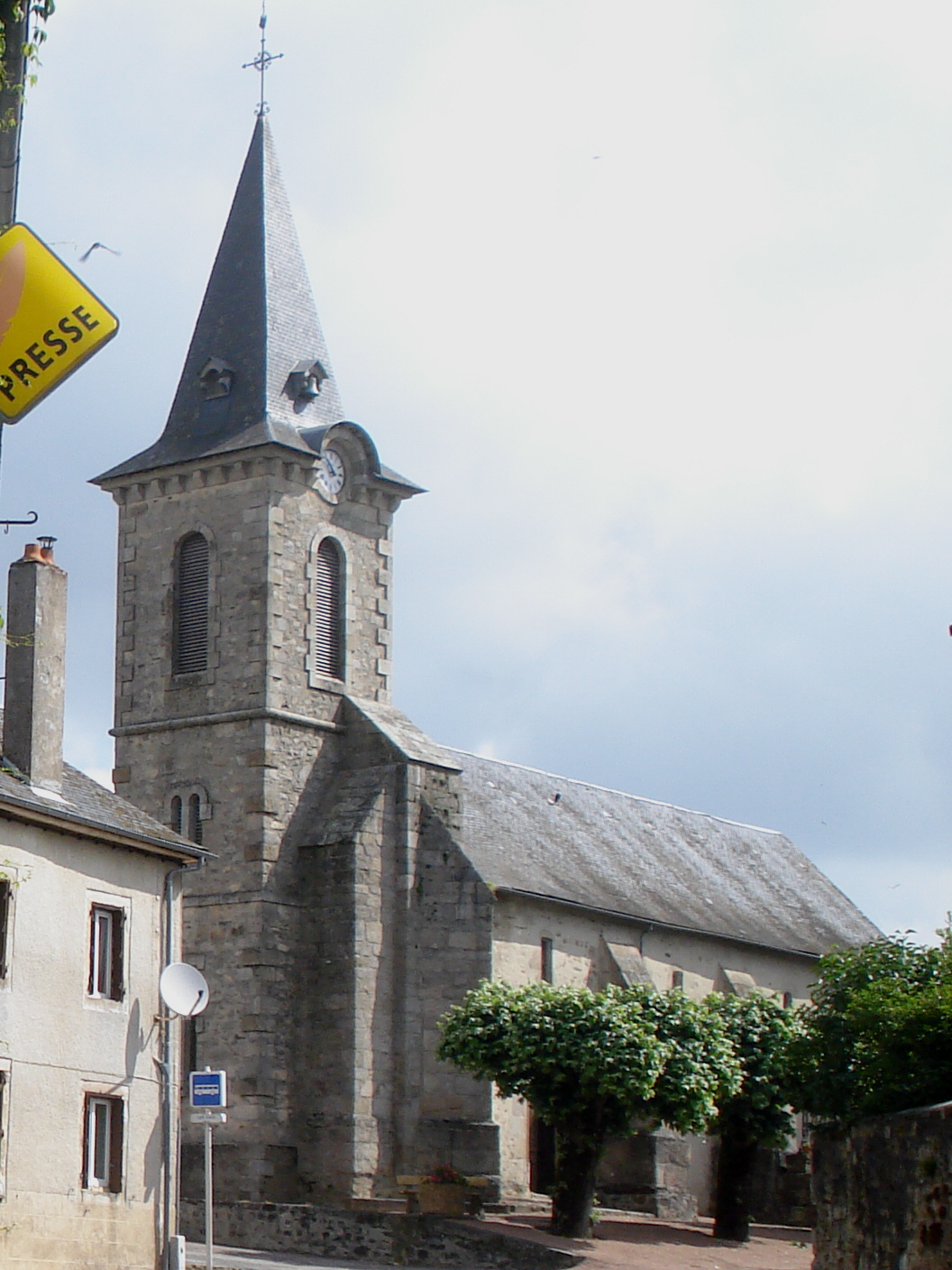
- The church in Les Cars

- Coat of arms
- Location of Les Cars
- Location within France Location within Nouvelle-Aquitaine
- Coordinates: 45°40′52″N 1°04′25″E
- Country: France
- Region: Nouvelle-Aquitaine
- Department: Haute-Vienne
- Arrondissement: Limoges
- Canton: Saint-Yrieix-la-Perche

Government
  - Mayor (2022–2026): Florence Belair
- Area^{1}: 16.72 km^{2} (6.46 sq mi)
- Highest elevation: 544 m (1,785 ft)
- Lowest elevation: 319 m (1,047 ft)
- Population (2023): 612
  - Density: 36.6/km^{2} (94.8/sq mi)
- Time zone: UTC+01:00 (CET)
  - Summer (DST): UTC+02:00 (CEST)
- INSEE/Postal code: 87029 /87230
- ^{1} French Land Register data, which excludes lakes, ponds, glaciers > 1 km^{2} (0.386 sq mi or 247 acres) and river estuaries.

Les Cars (French pronunciation: [le kaʁ]; Occitan: Los Cars) is a commune in the Haute-Vienne department in the Nouvelle-Aquitaine region in western France.

== See also ==
- Communes of the Haute-Vienne department
