= Marie-Élisabeth Thibault =

Marie-Élisabeth Thibault (born 1728), was a French courtier. She was a lady's maid to queen Marie Antoinette. She served as one of the four Première femme de chambre to the queen.

== Early life and marriage ==
She was born Marie-Élisabeth Nolle in 1728. She married Pierre Thibault. She was a widow by 1790.

== Royal service ==
She was one of the four Première femme de chambre to Marie-Antoinette in 1776-1792. The office of Première femme de Chambre was divided between four people: Julie Louise Bibault de Misery and the three deputies (survivancière) Henriette Campan, Marie-Élisabeth Thibault and Louise Quetpée de Laborde, who oversaw the chamber staff of the queen.

=== Revolution ===
On the night following the Women's March on Versailles 5 October 1789, Marie-Élisabeth Thibault and her colleague Adélaïde Auguié was on duty in the queen's bedroom, ignoring her orders to go to bed, when the mob invaded the palace. It was Auguié who opened the door to wittness the murder of the guard M. de Saint Marie outside of the bedroom, heard his call to protect the queen and closed and bolted the door; while Thibault woke and dressed the queen, after which they all fled the bedroom and eskaped via a secret passage to the king's quarters.

In June 1791, Antoinette Brunyer and Marie-Madeleine Lechevin de Billy, Madame de Neuville, the maid of Marie Thérèse of France and the Dauphin respectively, were the two female servants that accompanied the royal family on the Flight to Varennes, while Marie Antoinette's own maid Marie Elisabeth Thibault was sent beforehand to Brussels on her own. After the failed escape attempt, she was able to return to service in Marie Antoinette at the Tuileries.

François Hüe mention her among the women who gathered together for protection in the royal bedroom during the Insurrection of 10 August 1792, among whom he name princesse de Taranto, Marquise de la Roche-Aymon and Pauline de Tourzel; Marie-Élisabeth Thibault, Marie-Madeleine de Neuville, Antoinette Brunyer, Marie-Thérèse de Navarre and Anne Bazire.

She was among the employees that rejoined the royal family at the Feuillant convent after the Insurrection of 10 August 1792 and followed them to the Temple Prison on 13 August and spent the first days with them there. These people are named by Madame Royale as the Princesse de Lamballe, Madame de Tourzel, Pauline de Tourzel, the king's valet Claude Lorimier de Chamilly, the Dauphin's servant François Hüe, the Dauphin's maid Mme Cimbris (Marie Danneville, Mme Jorel de Saint-Brice), Marie Antoinette's maid Marie-Élisabeth Thibault, Madame Elisabeth's maid Marie-Thérèse Delalain de Navarre, and Madame Royale's maid Anne Bazire. On 19 August all of the employees of the family were removed from the Temple prison. All of them are noted to have been among the prisoners in La Force in September, were all of them except the Princesse de Lamballe escaped the September Massacres.

=== Attempt to rescue Marie Antoinette ===
During the Reign of Terror in January 1793, Marie Antoinette contacted François Augustin Regnier de Jarjayes via Jean-Baptiste Toulan. Together, they prepared a plan to rescue Marie Antoinette from Temple Prison, with Louise Quetpée de Laborde de Jarjaye acting as the go-between, entering the prison dressed as a washer woman. In February 1793, a police report described how the Jarjaye couple conspired with Marie-Élisabeth Thibault and Marie-Thérèse Delalain de Navarre in an escape plan to free Marie Antoinette from prison.
