= Adélaïde Auguié =

French court official (1758–1794)

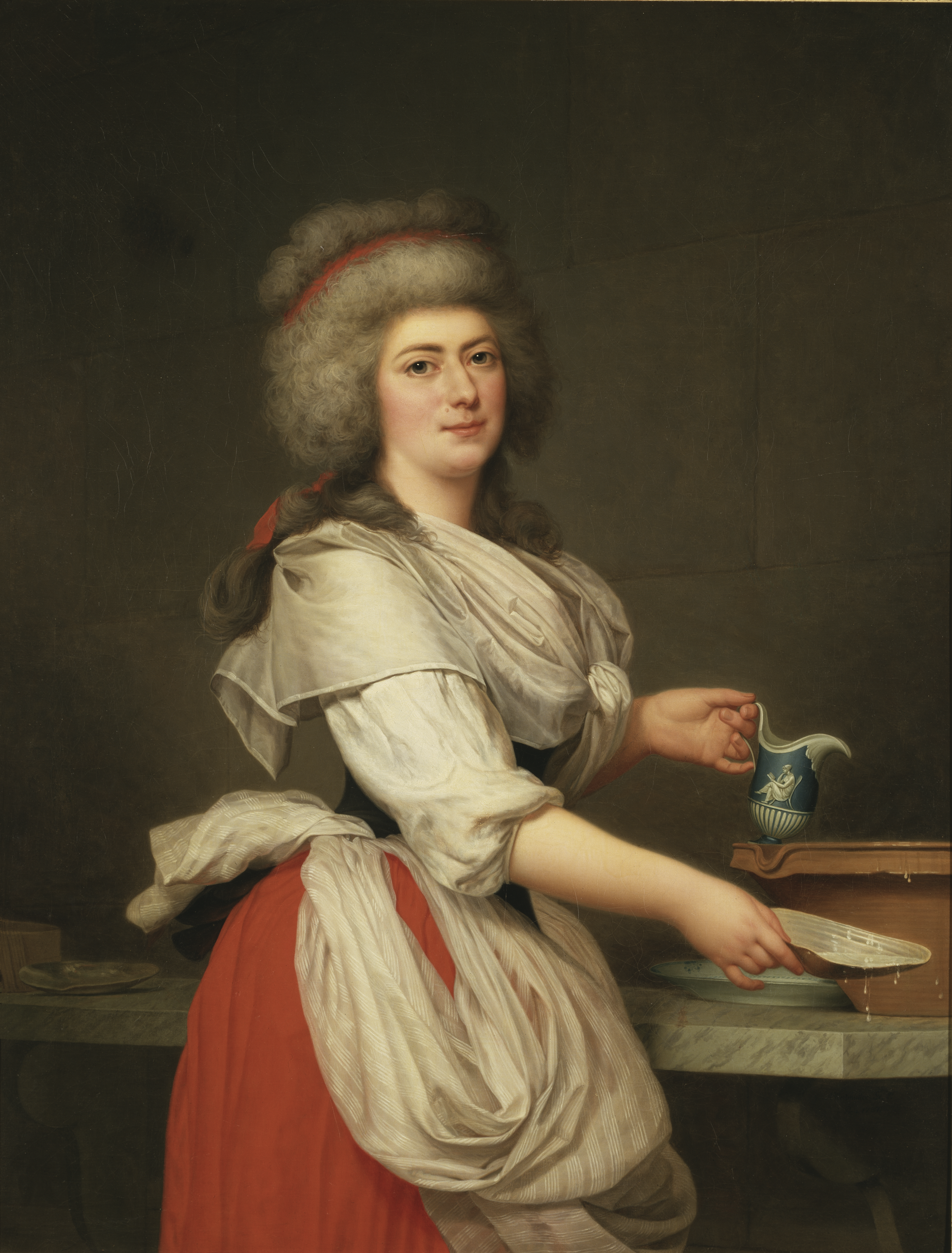
Madame A. Aughié, Friend of Queen Marie Antoinette, as a Dairymaid in the Royal Dairy at Trianon - Nationalmuseum - 21931

Adélaïde Henriette Auguié née Genet (1758–1794) was a French court official. She was a Femme de Chambre (lady's maid) to the queen of France, Marie Antoinette. She was the sister of the memoirist Henriette Campan.

== Life ==
Adélaïde Auguié was born to daughter of Edme-Jacques Genet and Marie-Anne-Louise Cardon. Her father was the highest-ranking clerk in the foreign office (the ambassador Citizen Genet was her younger brother). In 1780, she married the civil servant Pierre César Auguié and became the mother of Aglaé Auguié.

Her sister Julie Rosseau (1753–1828), was one of the deputy governesses for the Dauphin, and her other sister Henriette Campan was one of the Première femme de Chambre to the queen. In 1779, Adélaïde Auguié was appointed one of the Femme de Chambre to the queen. The Femme de Chambre served under the Première femme de Chambre, an office shared between Julie Louise Bibault de Misery, Henriette Campan, Marie-Élisabeth Thibault and Louise Quetpée de Laborde. Marie Antoinette called Adélaïde Auguié "My Lioness" because she was unusually tall.

On the night following the Women's March on Versailles 5 October 1789, Adélaïde Auguié and her colleague Marie-Élisabeth Thibault was on duty in the queen's bedroom when the palace, ignoring her orders to go to bed, when the mob invaded the palace. It was Auguié who opened the door to wittness the murder of the guard M. de Saint Marie outside of the bedroom, heard his call to protect the queen and closed and bolted the door; her colleague Thibault awoke the queen, after which they all fled the bedroom and eskaped via a secret passage to the king's quarters.

Auguié remained in employment of the queen until the Insurrection of 10 August 1792, when both she and her sister were allowed to leave the Palace unharmed by the insurrectionists. With the dissolution of the royal household, her employment was discontinued. During the Reign of Terror, the regime issued a warrant of arrest for Adélaïde Auguié, who committed suicde by throwng herself from a window.

There are several well known paintings preserved of Adélaïde Auguié.
