= Antoinette Brunyer =

French courtier

Antoinette Brunyer (1734–1801), was a French courtier.

She was born to Claude Chappuis and Jeanne Grace. She married first to lawyer Zacharie Rabut de Varenne, secondly to nobleman Louis Dufour de Montlouis, seigneur de Montlouis, and thirdly in 1781 to court physician Pierre-Édouard Brunyer (1729–1811), Premier médecin des Enfants de France. She was employed as première femme de chambre de Madame Royale lady's maid to Marie Thérèse of France in 1778-1792.

In June 1791, Antoinette Brunyer and Marie-Madeleine Lechevin de Billy, Madame de Neuville, the maid of Marie Thérèse of France and the Dauphn respectively, were the two female servants that accompanied the royal family on the Flight to Varennes, while Marie Antoinette's own maid Marie Elisabeth Thibault was sent beforehand to Brussels on her own. Both Brunyer and Neuville were interrogated, but released and allowed to return to service, upon the return to Paris.

François Hüe mention her among the women who gathered together for protection in the royal bedroom during the Insurrection of 10 August 1792, among whom he name princesse de Taranto, Marquise de la Roche-Aymon and Pauline de Tourzel; Marie-Élisabeth Thibault, Marie-Madeleine de Neuville, Antoinette Brunyer, Marie-Thérèse de Navarre and Anne Bazire. She lost her position after the Insurrection of 10 August 1792, and it was instead another one of the maids, Anne Bazire, who accompanied Marie Thérèse to the Temple, before all the servants of the family were dismissed on 19 August.

Danielle Gallet published her journal in 2003 with the title Dans l'ombre de Marie-Antoinette. Le Journal de Madame Brunyer, 1783-1792
