= French court =

French Royal court

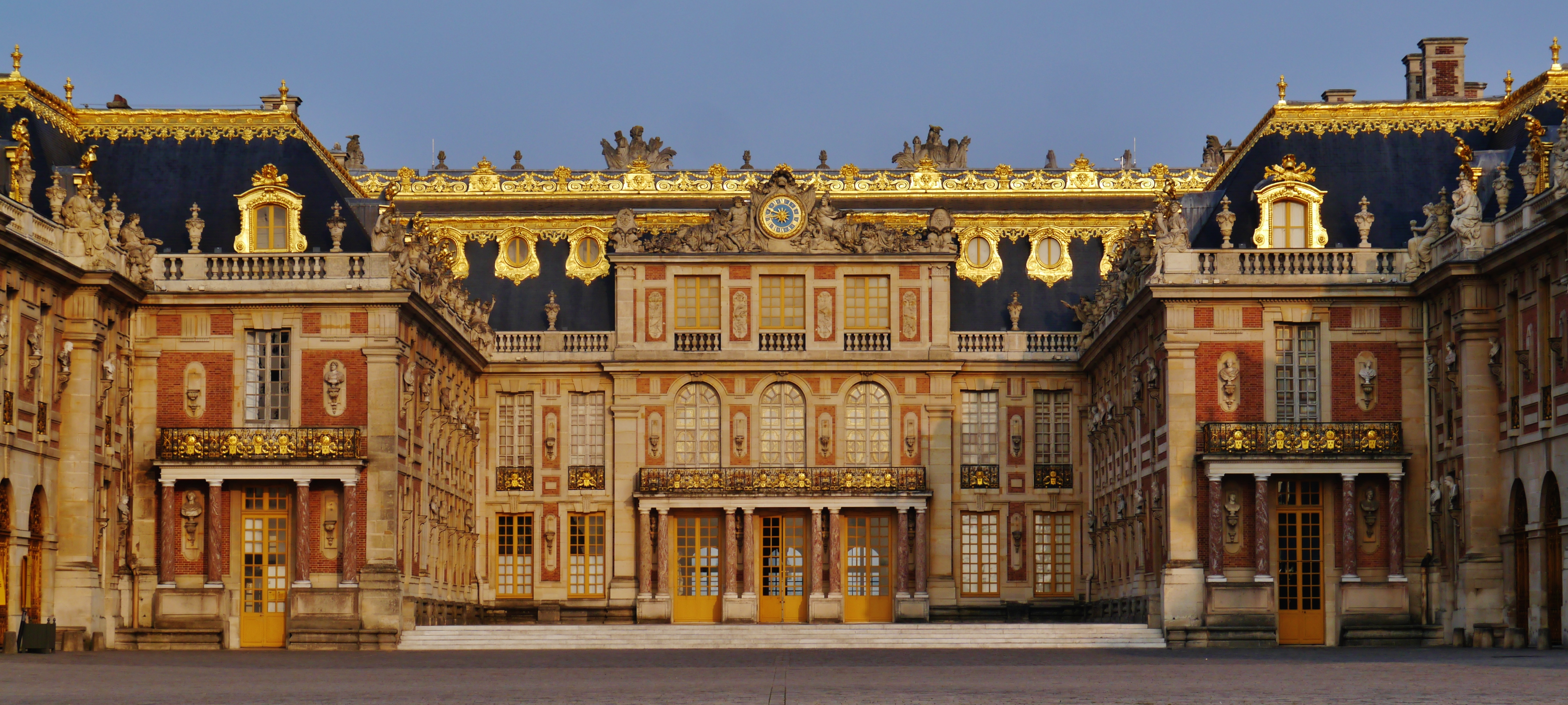
The Château de Versailles, completion of the curial system in France.

The French court ("Cour de France" in French), often simply "la cour", refers to the group of people, known as courtiers, who lived in the direct entourage of the king or, under the First and Second Empires, the emperor.

In the Middle Ages, this courtly world included not only great lords but also royal and ministerial officers responsible for the administration of the realm, as well as advisors. With the decline of the great feudal lords, it evolved into a gathering of courtiers who sought royal favor and pensions.

By the end of the Ancien régime, the term "court" also came to represent royal power in its entirety. The court was the epicenter of political life in France until the Revolution. Even in the 19th century, the term continued to denote the royal and imperial courts during the various restorations and the two imperial regimes under Napoleon.

== Etymology ==
The word cour is attested from the 10th century onwards in the form cort in the sense of "open space surrounded by walls, dwellings", but also in the form curt "residence of a sovereign and his entourage", then in 1100 in the sense of "entourage of a sovereign". Around 1130, we again find the form cort "sovereign and his council" here "assembly of vassals gathered by the sovereign to settle an important question or for a solemnity". In the early 14th century, estre bien de court meant "to enjoy the king's favor". In 1539, faire la court a quelqu'ung meant "to be eager to win someone's favor". A form without a final -t appears regularly in the 17th century, e.g.: cour "ensemble de personnes chercheant à obtenir les faveurs de quelqu'un". It is a term of Latin origin, more precisely derived from Late Latin curtis "farmyard" or/and Gallo-Romance *CORTE "farmyard, farm, estate" (> Old French cort, "arm, agricultural holding" cf. toponyms in -court) from the Latin accusative cōrtem, a popular contraction of Classical Latin cohortem, accusative of cohors "corner of a farm", in the military sense "division of the camp" from which "troops (quartered in this division)" accessorily "bodyguards of a great person". The modern spelling without -t is explained by an erroneous etymology based on the classical Latin curia (> curie, a learned loan, but whose regular evolution into French would have been into *coire), some of whose meanings are close. On the other hand, in the courtly derivative, the etymological -t- is retained. Courtiser and courtesan, on the other hand, are not attested before the 14th century, as they are borrowings from the Italian corteggiare and cortigiano, which have the same Latin etymon.

== From the origins to 1870 ==
=== The court under the Capetians ===
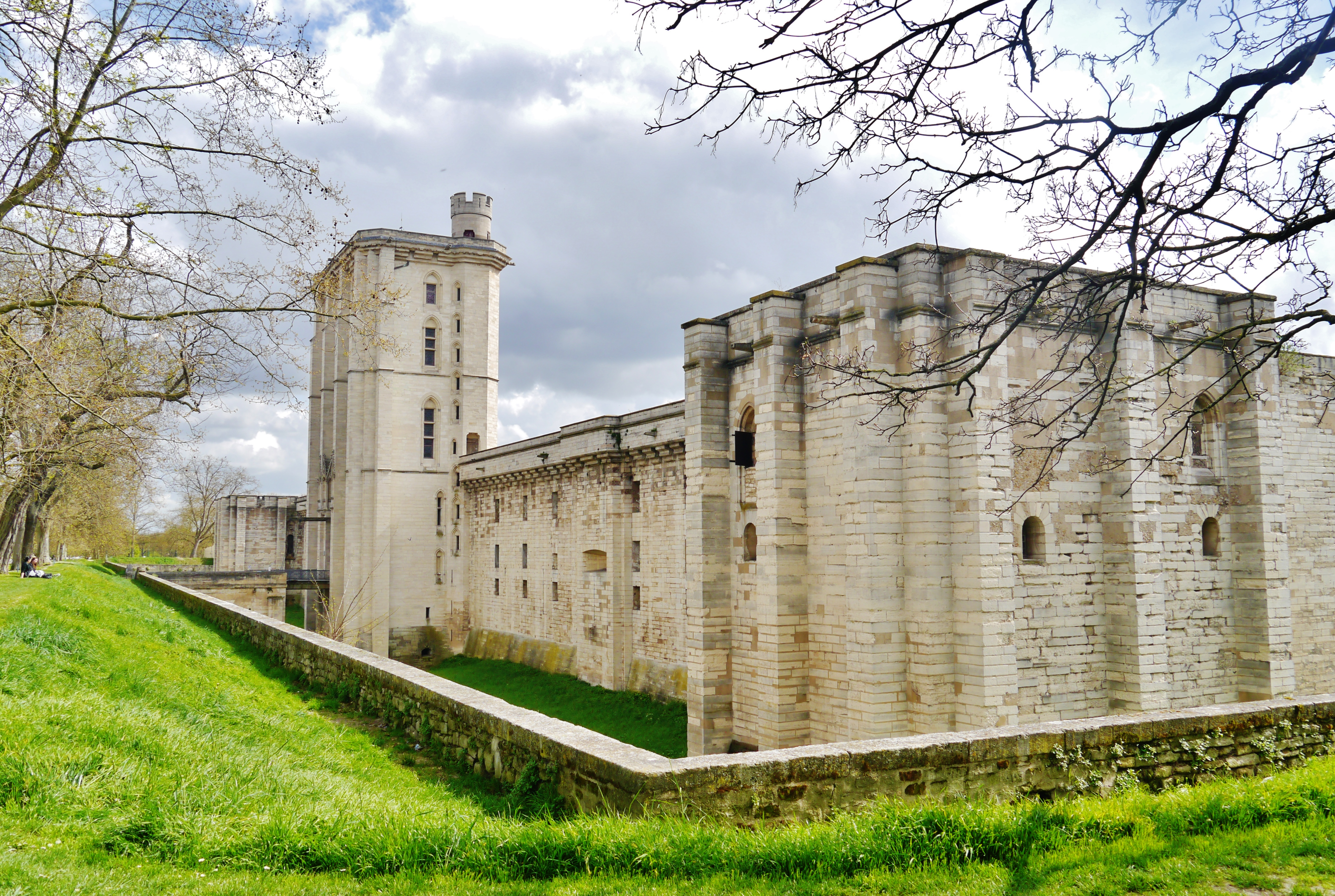
Château de Vincennes, one of the main residences of medieval kings.

In the Middle Ages, the court of the King of France was an administrative body comprising high-ranking officials such as the constable, the seneschal, and the chancellor, who were appointed from among the trusted nobles. Initially centered at the Palais de la Cité in Paris, the royal court was responsible for both administrative and judicial functions, with royal justice overseen by the chancellor. Over time, as the kings moved away from the Palais de la Cité in Paris, the judicial functions became increasingly distinct from the royal residence.

The French court in the Middle Ages was itinerant, as encapsulated by historian Boris Bove's statement: “where the king is, there the court is”. Apart from the Palais de la Cité and later (under Louis IX and the last direct Capetians) the Château du Louvre, the main residences of medieval monarchs were Vincennes, Compiègne, Fontainebleau, Melun, Senlis and Saint-Germain-en-Laye. These locations were often chosen for their proximity to forests, reflecting the king's interest in hunting as both a recreational activity and a demonstration of power.

The king spent a considerable portion of his time away from Paris, although this figure may be somewhat exaggerated, as numerous acts were produced in the sovereign's name by administrations based in the capital. Based solely on these royal edicts and ordinances, the distribution of acts produced in Paris is as follows: 2 out of 11 acts during the reign of Hugues Capet, 7 out of 45 during the reign of Robert II, 15 out of 62 under Henry I, 30 out of 120 during Philip I's reign, and 108 out of 239 during the reign of Louis VI. The notably high proportion of acts during Louis VI's reign likely indicates significant reorganization within the chancellery.

=== The court under the Valois ===
==== The advent of the first Valois ====
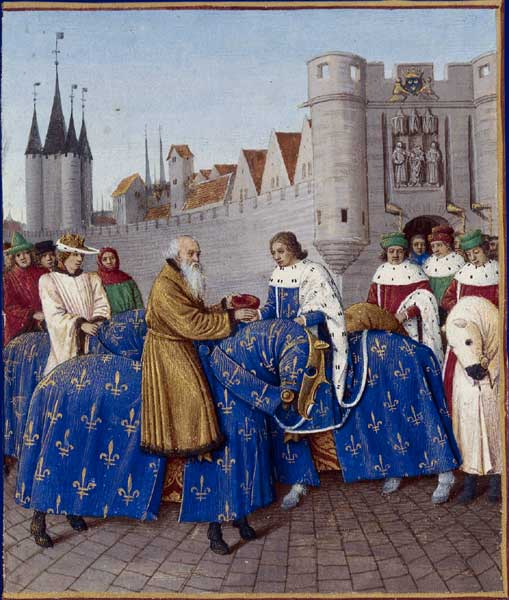
King Charles V welcomes Emperor Charles IV to Paris: note the Emperor's black horse and the King's white horse.

Lack of financial resources, war against the English who claimed the throne, the captivity of King John II, provincial rebellions and jacqueries, the Parisian revolt led by Étienne Marcel, and the struggle against the Free Companies all posed significant challenges to the early Valois kings in consolidating their authority over the kingdom.

King Charles V focused on reinforcing the grandeur and prestige of the crown. He meticulously cultivated an image of magnificence and luxury, with his daily routines governed by elaborate ceremonial rituals. These rituals were later emulated in Burgundy and then in Spain, contributing to the rigid etiquette of the Habsburgs. His residences, notably the Louvre Castle and the Hôtel Saint-Pol, were adorned with opulent features, including menageries with lions, which became a notable attraction in the capital.

Diplomatically, Charles V endeavored to assert his authority on the international stage. According to the legal experts of Philippe Auguste, the king presented himself as an "emperor in his kingdom." During the visit of Emperor Charles IV, everything was done to make the King of France the equal of his uncle: Charles V rode a white horse, the emblem of sovereignty, and gave black horses to the Emperor and the King of the Romans.

==== The Valois and the Renaissance ====
The end of the Hundred Years' War, and the growing influence of the Italian Renaissance, led to profound changes in French court life. With the advent of cannon fire rendering the old fortresses obsolete, royal residences progressively tore down their walls, and architects inspired by Italian examples were able to incorporate elements of pleasure and comfort into their plans, turning châteaux into places of pleasure and entertainment. This was the case for the old Louvre Castle and Fontainebleau (transformed by François I and Henri II), but also in the Loire Valley for the former royal fortresses of Amboise and Blois (embellished from the reigns of Charles VIII and Louis XII), following which many of the region's noble castles were transformed. Galleries covered with paintings and Mannerist frescoes, salons with ceilings carved from rare woods and surrounded by tapestries, landscaped parks dotted with marble statues rivaling the antiques, were the setting for the splendors of the court.

The French court became a place of intellectual reflection, an environment conducive to discovery and progress, and a magnet for artists. Artists were encouraged, welcomed and protected by the sovereigns. These included artists such as Leonardo da Vinci, Primaticcio and Benvenuto Cellini, writers like Ronsard, Du Bellay and Clément Marot, and humanists like Montaigne and Guillaume Budé. The Valois thus combined their role as great patrons of the arts with a royal dignity that was already a thousand years old.

The role of women at the French court evolved significantly, leading to new forms of sociability. From the 1440s onwards, the practice of the king maintaining concubinage with favored mistresses became established tradition. Notable examples include Agnès Sorel for Charles VII, Anne de Pisseleu for François I, and Diane de Poitiers for Henri II. The king surrounded himself with cheerful, agreeable women from the lower and middle nobility, drawing their families and close friends into their ascension. The nobility, increasingly gathered around the king, indulged in new festivities and entertainments.

The growing role of women in court life was however not merely a question of royal mistresses. It was also an issue of women playing a part in public representation, and a growing number of women being formally employed as ladies-in-waiting. Anne de Bretagne played a notable role in this evolution by establishing the "Grand Court des Dames." According to Brantôme, she maintained "a very large retinue of ladies and girls," reflecting her influence and the expanding social dynamics at court. It was in the end of the 15th century and early 16th century that emulation of the new courts of the Italian Renaissance made ladies-in-waiting fashionable in official court ceremonies and representation, and female court offices became more developed and numerous in the French court as well as in other European courts. The introduction of ladies-in-waiting increased in great numbers at the French court at this time: from a mere five in 1286 and still only 23 in 1490, to 39 in 1498 and roughly 54 during the 16th century. This expansion of female presence at court has been attributed to both Anne of Brittany, who encouraged all male courtiers to send their daughters to her, and to Francis I of France, who was criticized for bringing to court "the constant presence" of large crowds of women, who gossiped and interfered in state affairs. Francis I once said: "a court without ladies is a court without a court". A number of new offices for female court officials were created in this period, such as that of Premiere dame d'honneur, dame d'atour and Premiere femme du chambre, as well as the number of women being employed.

The court thus became synonymous with prestige, all the more so as successive monarchs began a process of ceremonializing their daily lives. Francis I created the office of Master of Ceremonies, which he entrusted to Jean Pot de Chemault. Under Henry III, this position was known as the Grand Master of Ceremonies, and its purpose was to organize the ceremonial surrounding the life of the king and royal family (births, christenings, weddings, funerals), the solemnities associated with the monarchy (joyful entries, coronations), and major political events (ambassadorial receptions, lit de justice, Estates General and assemblies of notables). At the same time, fashions from foreign courts were imported into France: Queen Catherine de Médicis and her son Henri III introduced Italian fashions and Spanish customs. The first court regulations date from 1578 and 1585 (notably the edict setting out "the order in which the king wishes to be held in his court, both in terms of hours and the manner in which he wishes to be honored and served"). This was the gradual birth of etiquette.

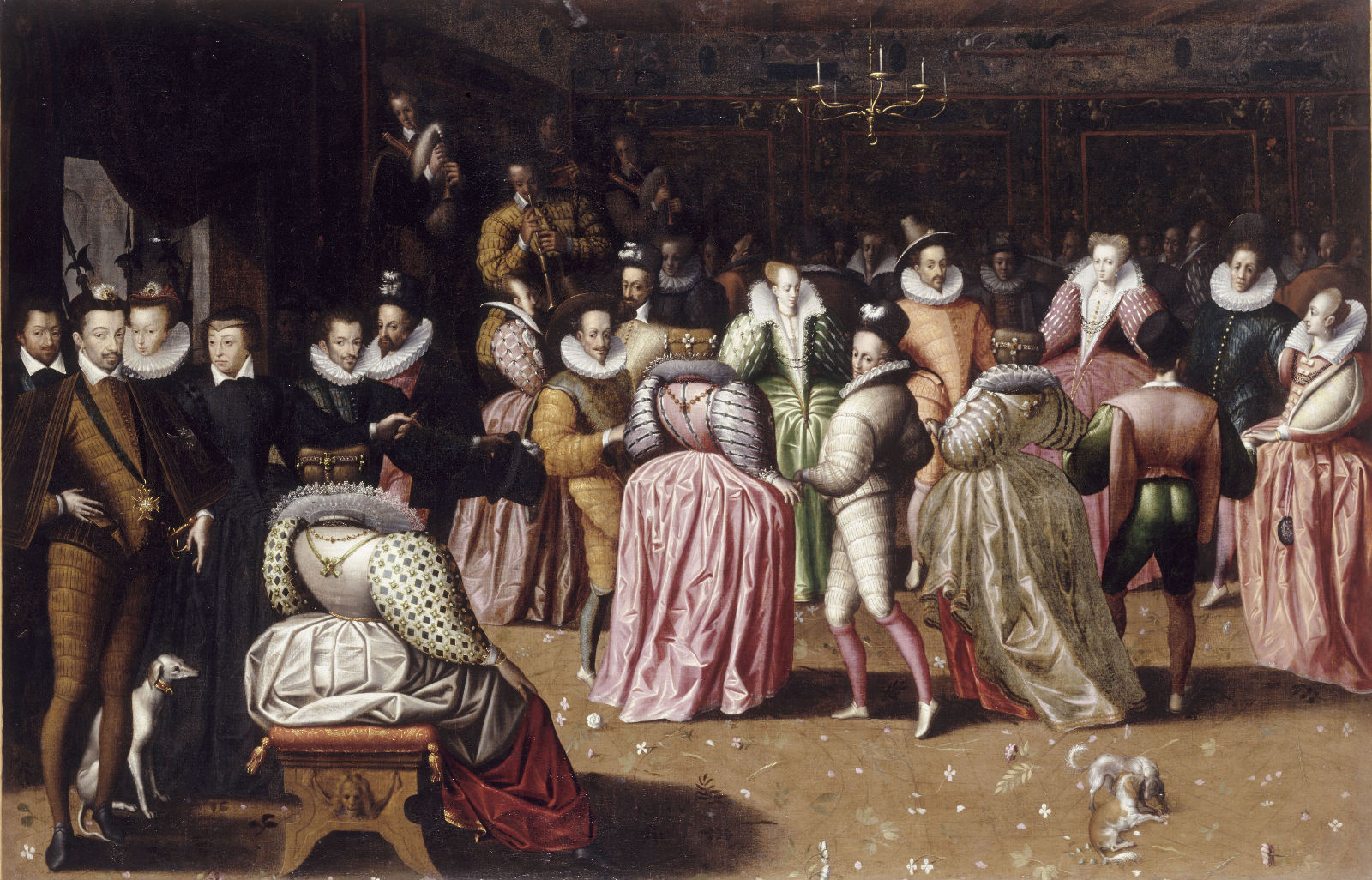
A ball at the court of Henri III.

Parties, balls, banquets, concerts, hunting, architectural renewal, promotion of the arts and sciences and the development of fashion were all elements that made the Valois-Angoulême court the most sumptuous in Europe. This sophistication was also reflected in the care given to the education of the nobility, who undertook to teach their sons and daughters disciplines as diverse as music, song, dance, rhetoric, dialectics, philosophy, literature, Greek and Latin.

In her novel The Princess of Cleves, Madame de La Fayette describes the immense splendor of the French court during the reign of Henry II:

Magnificence and gallantry never appeared in France with such splendor as in the last years of the reign of Henry II. This prince was gallant, well-made and amorous; although his passion for Diane de Poitiers, duchess of Valentinois, had begun more than twenty years earlier, it was no less violent, and he gave no less glowing testimony to it.

As he succeeded admirably in all bodily exercises, he made it one of his greatest occupations. Madame de Valentinois' colors and figures were everywhere, and she herself appeared with all the fittings that her granddaughter Mademoiselle de La Marck, then to be married, could have.

The Queen's presence authorized hers. This princess was beautiful, albeit past her prime; she loved grandeur, magnificence and pleasure. The king had married her when he was still duc d'Orléans, and had as his eldest son the dauphin, who died at Tournon, a prince whose birth and great qualities were destined to fill the shoes of King François I, his father.

The queen's ambitious temperament made her find great sweetness in reigning; she seemed to suffer without difficulty the king's attachment to the duchess of Valentinois, and she showed no jealousy of it; but she was so deeply concealed that it was difficult to judge her feelings, and politics obliged her to approach this duchess from her person, to approach the king as well. This prince loved the commerce of women, even those with whom he was not in love: he stayed every day at the queen's at circle time, where all that was most beautiful and best made, of both sexes, did not fail to be found [...].

=== The court under the Bourbons ===
Although Henry IV and Louis XIII limited the development of the court and gave priority to their private lives, the court began to take shape from the time of the last Valois kings and the first two kings of the House of Bourbon. From then on, the French court encompassed all those who approached the king on a daily basis, lived in his entourage or accompanied him on his travels. These courtiers can be divided into four categories:

- the great officers of the crown, who run the services of the State,
- the King's Household, comprising all the staff who served the King in his day-to-day affairs,
- the Houses of the Queens, the Children of France, and the Princes and Princesses of the royal family,
- private individuals, nobles and non-nobles alike, who came to the King to perform services for him or to seek favors.

==== The court under Louis XIV: the domestication of the nobility ====
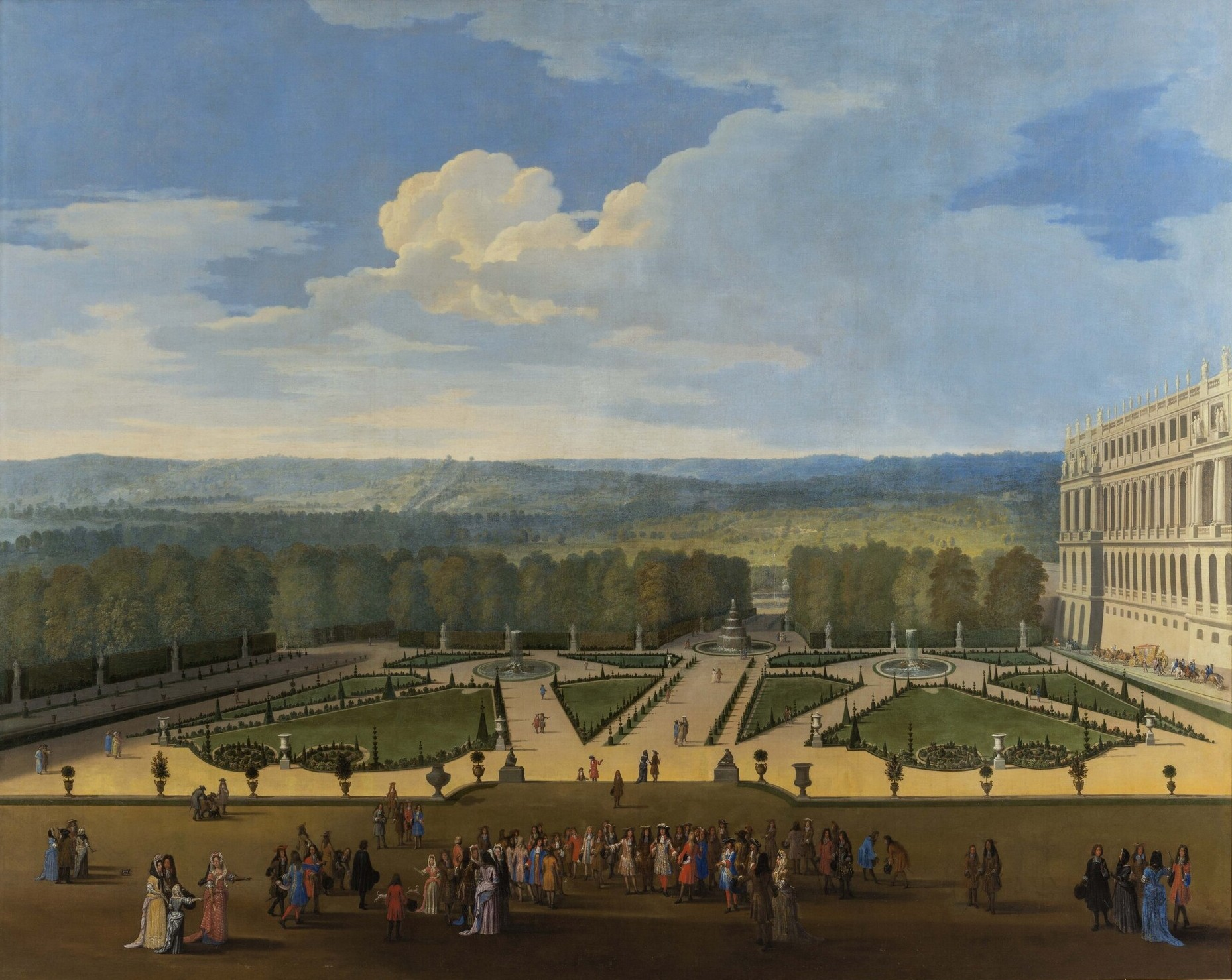
Promenade of Louis XIV surrounded by the court in the northern parterre of the Versailles gardens, circa 1688.

At the beginning of his reign, Louis XIV still followed the tradition of an itinerant court, which moved to the Louvre Palace or the châteaux of Saint-Germain, Vincennes, Fontainebleau or even Chambord, depending on the hunting season and the king's wishes. As early as 1661, and again in 1664, the king supplemented the court regulations of his predecessor Henry III.

It was at Versailles, however, that Louis XIV was quick to settle his court. In 1682, he decided to relocate the court and government to his father's former hunting lodge, where he had begun extensive embellishment work.

Under Louis XIV, it is estimated that, depending on the day, between 3,000 and 10,000 courtiers flocked to the court, in a highly heterogeneous and hierarchical society: some were there by birthright, others by social obligation, still others out of interest or curiosity, and still others to earn a living.

The court's budget is estimated at between 5 and 10% of the total state budget (far behind that of war). It was a place of power, intrigue and representation, where etiquette played an ever-increasing role. By instituting a complex code around his every move, the king put himself on stage, filled every stage of his daily life with symbols, and ensured that he had the closest possible control over the great and good of the kingdom. This process of domesticating the nobility, made necessary by the Fronde episode at the beginning of the reign, turned aristocrats into the king's servants, encouraging them to seek his favor.

The court also retained its role as the center of the kingdom's cultural life: the king invited numerous artists, including the writers Molière, Racine and Boileau, the composer Lully, and the painters Le Brun and Rigaud.

According to Norbert Elias (La société de cour and Sur le processus de civilisation), the court of Versailles was the model for European courts. In particular, it played a decisive role in what Elias calls the "process of civilization", i.e. the internalization of moral standards by individuals and the repression of aggressive impulses. Court customs, etiquette, the ban on dueling, etc., would have spread throughout society via a process of "curialization", i.e. the generalization of the court's moral model to the whole of social life.

==== The court under the Regency ====
After the death of Louis XIV and a reign marked by death and moral as well as religious rigor, the Regency of Philippe d'Orléans marked a return to lightness and pleasure. The court returned to festivities and insouciance, and settled in Paris: the young King Louis XV lived in the Tuileries Palace, while the Regent lived in the Royal Palace, which became the heart of the kingdom's political and artistic life.

==== The court under Louis XV ====
After an absence of seven years, Louis XV moved back to Versailles in June 1722. Under his reign, the court became the most important in terms of numbers. He gave great prominence to the women's courts, whose main leisure activities were hunting, promenades and games tables (many dauphines ran gaming circles).

A modest and shy man, Louis XV wished to separate his private life from the obligations of representation imposed by his predecessor's model. In 1724, he abandoned the "tables royales" (loss of commensality) in favor of "petits soupers" from 1735 onwards.

Nevertheless, Versailles protocol remained rigid. As early as the 1730s, there was a major change in admission procedures: gentlemen were no longer admitted to the court unless they could prove their former nobility. This system was even reinforced in 1759: degrees of "precedence" and opportunities to be presented to the king and his family were thus increased. "In future, no woman will be presented to His Majesty, nor will any man be allowed to ride in his carriages (Note: Riding in the carriages is the proof of admission cited by La Gazette. The official nature of La Gazette, for the honors of the Court, is attested by correspondence between Chérin, the Duc de Richelieu and Vergennes concerning the form of presentation (Bluche op.cit. page 30). In the “Versailles" section of the Gazette, the presentation reads: “Les (noms des personnes) qui avaient eu l'honneur d'être présentés au roi, ont eu le (mention de la date) celui de monter dans les voitures de Sa Majesté, & de la suivre à la chasse” as can be seen from the admissions.) or follow him hunting, unless he has first produced, before the genealogist of his Orders, three titles establishing each degree of the husband's family: such as marriage contract, will, partition, act of guardianship, donation, etc., by which filiation will be clearly established since 1400.”

==== The court under Louis XVI: the court as a trap for the monarchy ====
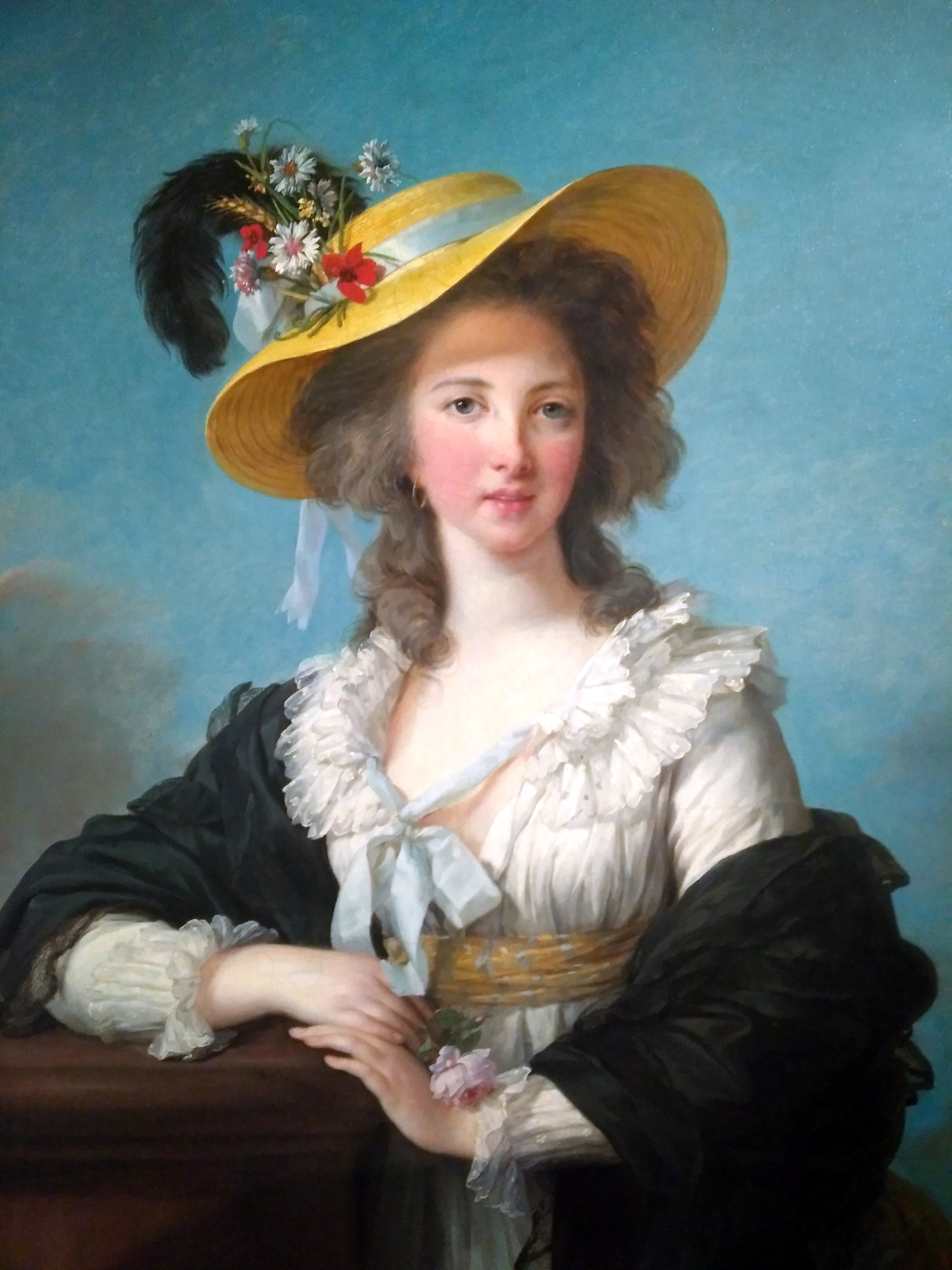
The Duchesse de Polignac, an emblematic figure of the court under Louis XVI.

In a kingdom experiencing ever-increasing financial difficulties, the sumptuary expenses of the court were a major burden: as soon as Louis XVI ascended the throne, the king set about reducing them. However, in his desire to abolish unnecessary charges, the king had to buy them back from their holders at a high price, and give extra wages to officers for their catering expenses.

Wasteful spending remained high: total court expenditure in 1789 was over 35 million livres, a figure representing one-fifteenth of total state revenue. As a result, the court became increasingly unpopular.

Since the establishment of the court at Versailles, honorary privileges, veritable instruments of reward, have provoked intrigues among courtiers and encouraged the formation of parties and coteries. The families of the great nobility shared the most prestigious offices of which they felt they had a legitimate claim. Queen Marie-Antoinette, who had little appreciation of the old court, was more inclined to favor those close to her, such as the Princesse de Lamballe and the Duchesse de Polignac and her family. This favoritism fed the resentment of some of the court nobility, and contributed to the sovereign's unpopularity.

In the eyes of contemporaries, any reform of the court system would have involved altering the monarchical model inherited from Louis XIV, and would therefore have threatened to undermine the foundations of royal power. Faced with these multiple difficulties, neither the king nor the queen showed themselves capable of developing a new curial model.

=== After the Revolution ===
==== The court under the First Empire ====
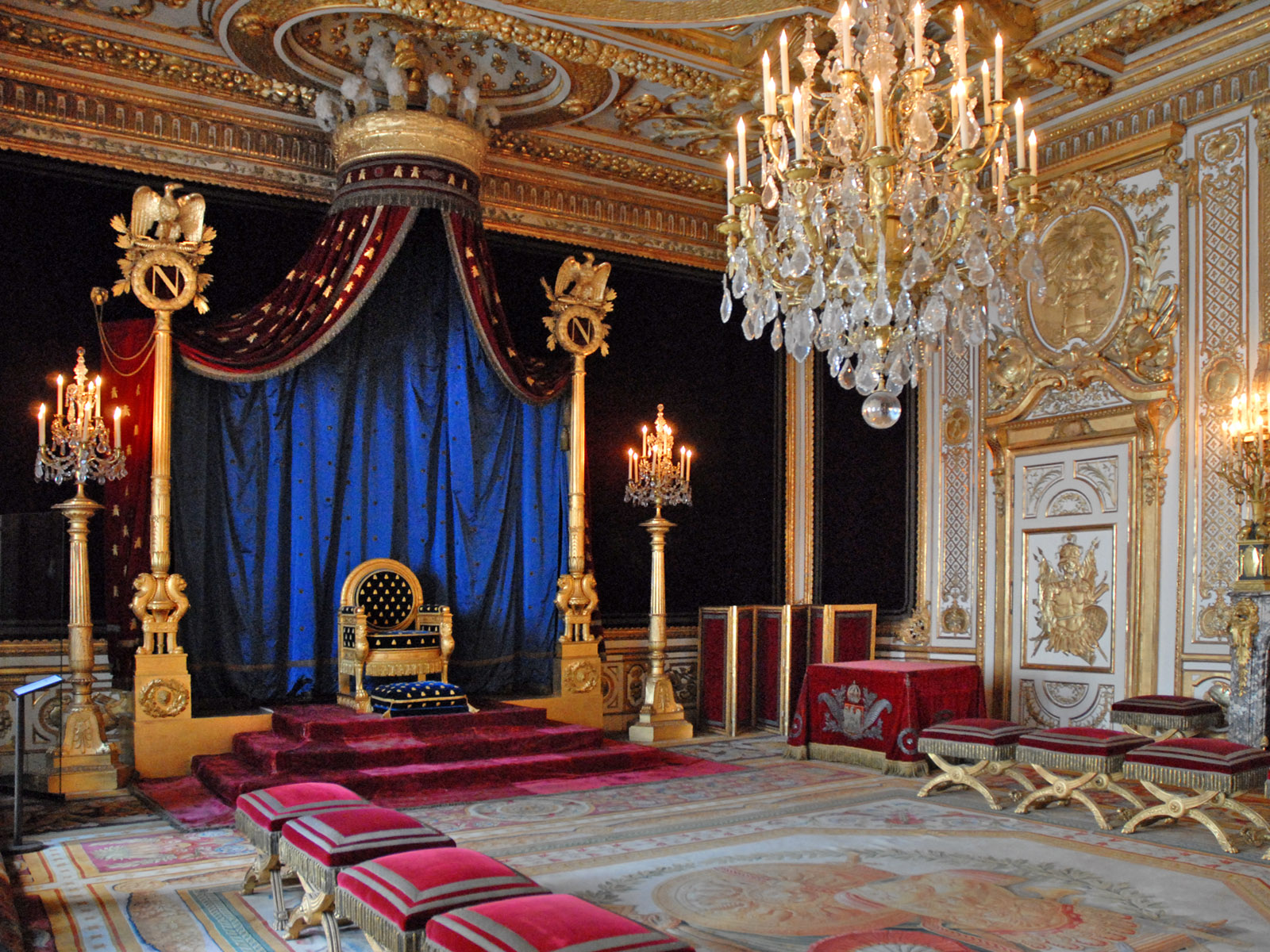
The 1808 throne room at the Château de Fontainebleau.

From the end of the Consulate, Bonaparte established a court that played a crucial role in the transition to the Empire. After the coronation, the court helped to glorify and entrench the new regime in the country, and to legitimize it in the eyes of Europe. The court was a revival of monarchical traditions and comprised members of the imperial dynasty, high dignitaries, and officers of the crown, as well as various attendants such as squires, heralds, and pages. In addition to the Tuileries, Napoleon reinvigorated several of the great palaces of the monarchy, in particular Fontainebleau, Compiègne and Saint-Cloud, but also Rambouillet and Trianon.

As a political tool, the court was a means of attracting Ancien Régime aristocrats, many of whom had returned from emigration, controlling the Empire's leading figures, and creating the conditions for a mix between the old nobility and the new elite. With this in mind, in 1808 Napoleon revived the principle of nobility by creating what was to become the nobility of the Empire: in addition to princes (created in 1804) and dukes (1806), there were now counts, barons and knights. However, Napoleon failed in his bid to renew the pomp of Versailles.

==== The court under the Restoration ====
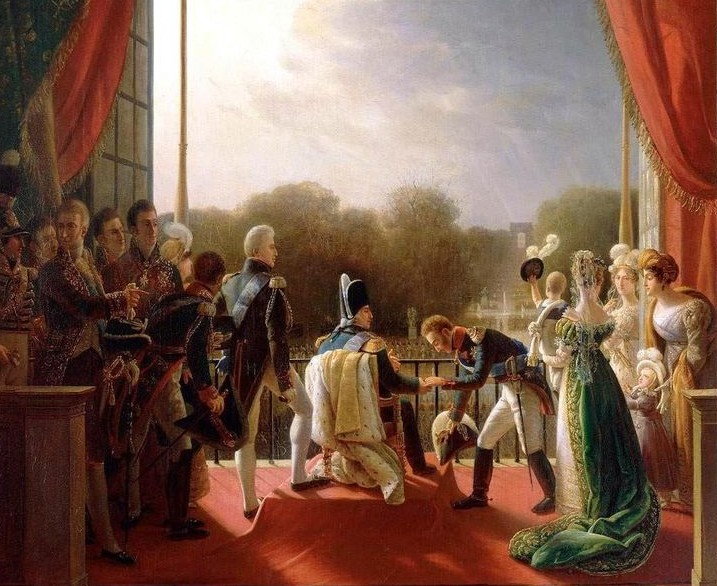
The royal family and court surrounding Louis XVIII on the Tuileries balcony in 1824.

Under the Restoration, the court was unable to regain the scale it had known under the Ancien Régime, mainly for budgetary reasons. The rules of etiquette were gradually lost, so much so that in 1818 the Countess de Genlis had to write a Dictionnaire critique et raisonné des étiquettes de la Cour ou l'esprit des étiquettes et des usages anciens à l'usage de la noblesse.

Nonetheless, questions of precedence once again took center stage at the Tuileries. Suspicious of the House of Orléans, Louis XVIII sought to belittle his cousins, for example, by denying them the predicate of Royal Highnesses. The Duc d'Orléans, the future Louis-Philippe, analyzed the King's aims in his personal papers:

His aim was to create two families among Princes of the same blood and invested with the same rights. One family of Royal Princes would be surrounded by the same honors as Royalty itself, and would even have their own bodyguards distinct from those of the King, wearing the colors of their livery, and reporting only to them. According to Louis XVIII, this class of Princes alone formed the royal family, while the other class, that of the Princes du Sang, was now made up of secondary Princes, reduced to the condition of first private individuals of the state, excluded from the royal family, and only included in what was termed the Royal House, a subtle qualification invented by Louis XVIII to designate indiscriminately all the Princes called to succeed him, to place the second class of Princes completely outside that which he claimed to have considered as being exclusively the royal family.

At the end of the regime, Charles X's court came in for considerable criticism, and was eventually denounced by the royalists themselves as having precipitated the downfall of the monarchy: Comte de Salaberry, for example, called it the first of the four “plagues of the monarchy”.

==== The court under the July monarchy ====
In an effort to distinguish his reign from that of his predecessors, Louis-Philippe sought to establish a monarchy devoid of the traditional court protocols. The civil list established under Charles X was abolished on 31 July 1830. In 1830, the average monthly expenditure for the civil list was approximately 3.3 million francs; by January 1831, this amount had been reduced to less than 290,000 francs. The king's military household was entirely eliminated, and the French royal household was scaled down to 16 individuals, including aides-de-camp, the first secretary, the cabinet secretary, and the under-secretary. The ceremonial roles previously associated with the monarchy, such as grand chamberlain, grand master, grand equerry, grand veneur, first gentleman, bailiffs, and valets de chambre, were also discontinued. Rather than relocating to the Tuileries Palace, Louis-Philippe chose to remain at the Palais Royal, the Orléans residence since 1692.

Despite these changes, Louis-Philippe faced significant opposition. His legitimacy was questioned by the Legitimists, who considered Charles X's abdication to be invalid, as well as by the Henriquinquists, who supported the Duc de Bordeaux, and by Republicans. The so-called "bourgeois king", who had initially conformed to popular expectations, later demonstrated a different stance, a shift that was noted by the chansonnier Béranger.

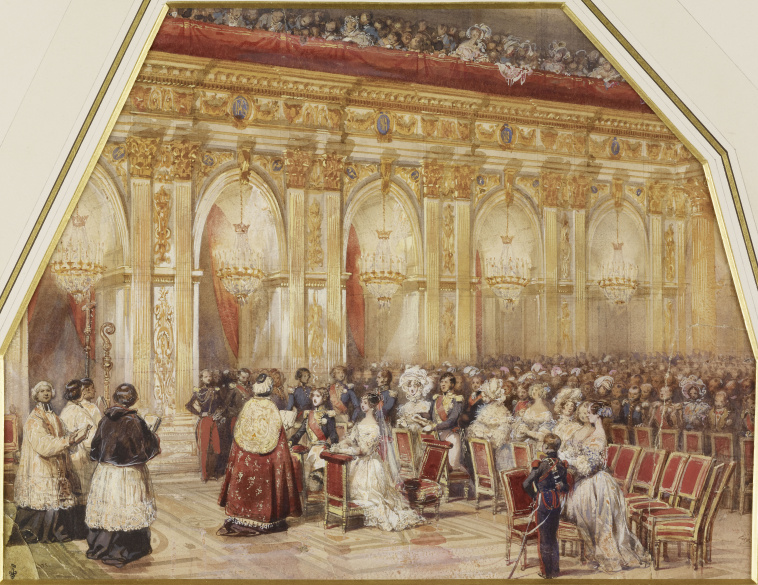
The wedding of the Duc d'Orléans and Princess Hélène de Mecklembourg-Schwerin at Fontainebleau in 1837.

The move to the Tuileries in 1831 and the increase in spending on the king's new civil list from 1832 onwards were the first signs of the "royalization" of the July Monarchy. The growing role of Queen Marie-Amélie in the palace, and the development of courtly offices such as that of the Maréchale de Lobau, the Queen's lady-in-waiting, also attest to the curialization of the regime, culminating in the festivities given on the occasion of the marriage of the King's eldest son, Ferdinand-Philippe, at the Château de Fontainebleau in 1837. The Comtesse de Boigne saw in these celebrations the reflection of an "obvious desire to move up the ladder of royalty", while Count Rodolphe Apponyi, attaché to the Austrian Embassy in Paris, wrote in his diary:

Never, since King Louis-Philippe has been on the throne, have I seen the court more brilliant, more reassured, more solidly established than at Fontainebleau; the ministers looked radiant, from all sides came the happiest news : the camps had been brilliant, the army had shown itself to be beautiful, animated by a good spirit, the provinces calm; the elections had surpassed all expectations, to the point where it was feared that the opposition would be too much in the minority and that this Chamber would become similar to the one that, under the Restoration, was nicknamed the Untraceable.

==== The court under Napoleon III: the imperial party ====
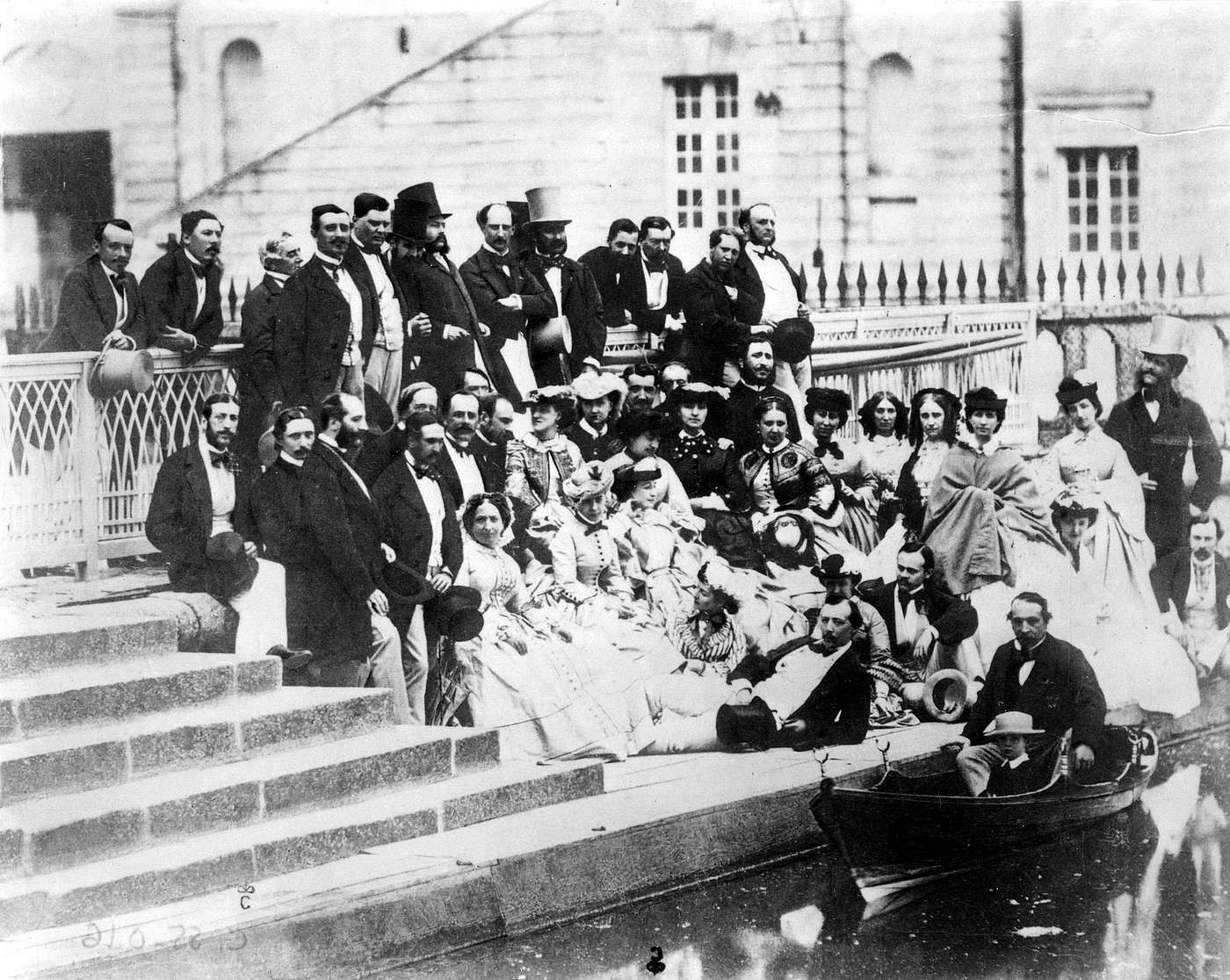
The court at Fontainebleau, circa 1860: the Emperor and Prince Imperial are on the boat in the foreground.

When the Second Empire was proclaimed, Emperor Napoleon III intended to enhance the prestige of his young regime by restoring the lustre of court life. His wife, Empress Eugénie de Montijo, was responsible for organizing and animating it.

The court was characterized by its cosmopolitan and brilliant nature, though it was also criticized as being overly frivolous and carefree, earning the description of a constant "imperial party." It was structured around the imperial family, including the emperor's household, the military household, the empress's household, the household of the prince imperial and those of prince Napoleon, princess Marie-Clotilde and princess Mathilde

Endowed with a large official pension and a very comfortable civil list, the festivities and grandiose receptions of the emperor and empress also gave the "imperial feast" a propaganda role. Traditional court etiquette was reinstated, with specific roles such as squires, chamberlains, and palace prefects being reestablished.

Court life was mainly centered on the Tuileries Palace, the seat of imperial power, but customs tended to diversify. As early as 1856, the Château de Compiègne became a regular autumn vacation spot for the court, for three to six weeks. With the exception of the 1860s and 1867s, the sovereigns invited numerous privileged guests in "series" of around a hundred guests each. Etiquette was kept to a minimum, and guests enjoyed a high degree of independence.

Other imperial residences are also emblematic of court life during the Second Empire, such as the Château de Fontainebleau, the Château de Saint-Cloud and the Villa Eugénie in Biarritz.

=== The courts of exiled sovereigns ===
==== Court of Louis XVIII (1793–1814, 1815) ====
During the Revolution, royalists were exiled throughout Europe.

During the Hundred Days, King Louis XVIII once again went into exile. Some of his loyal followers followed him to Ghent. Settled in the Hôtel d'Hane-Steenhuyse, the deposed sovereign formed a scaled-down version of the court he had held at the Tuileries. Count de Blacas was put in charge of the King's household, and a government-in-exile was formed.

==== Napoleon I's court (1814–1815, 1815–1821) ====
During his first exile on Elba, Napoleon was recognized as the sovereign of the principality. Consequently, it was natural for the emperor, who retained his title, to adopt the customs of the imperial court at his residences (the Palazzina dei Mulini and the Villa Napoleonica). He was followed in this first exile by several loyal followers, and family members and close friends visited him, including Madame Mère, his sister Pauline Borghese, and the Countess Walewska.

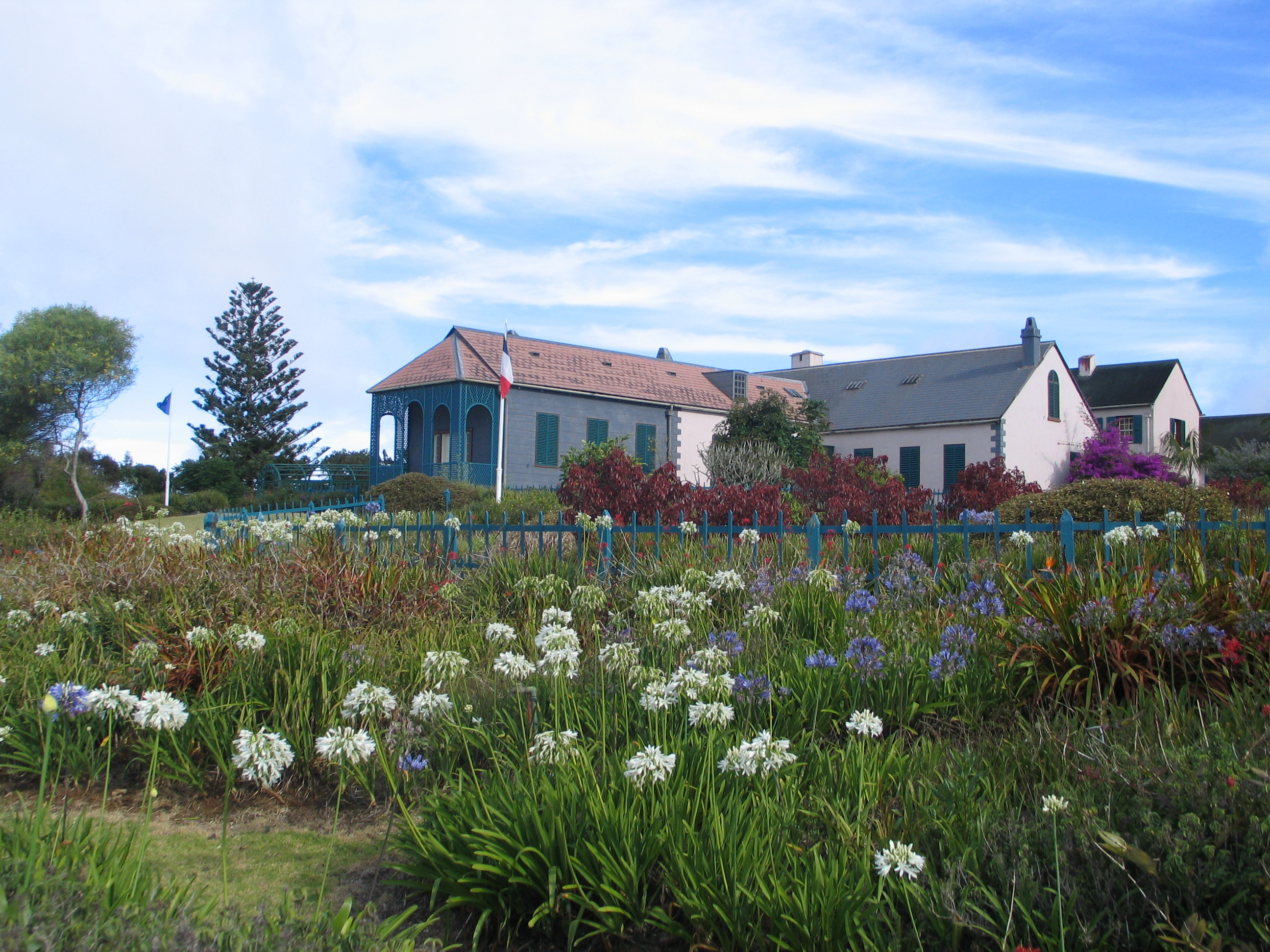
Longwood House, the modest "imperial palace" of a deposed emperor.

After Waterloo, the British deported the former emperor to the island of St. Helena as a prisoner. He was accompanied into exile by a handful of loyal followers, including the grand marshal of the palace Bertrand, Count de Las Cases, General de Montholon and General Gourgaud, as well as servants. Several of them chose to return to Europe after a few years, and other companions, most of them Corsican and sent by the Bonaparte family, arrived. The ex-emperor also welcomed several visitors to the island, such as the young British woman Betsy Balcombe.

At Longwood House, Napoleon reconstituted a semblance of a court by attempting to maintain the customs of the Tuileries: maintaining court titles and functions, re-establishing strict imperial etiquette, soliciting audiences, and even maintaining étrennes for the few "courtiers". This protocol, which might seem incongruous given the circumstances of his detention, can be explained, as Walter Scott does, by the desire to preserve the dignity attached to the imperial coronation, as much as by the need for isolation from his jailers:

The real cause which made him desire to receive the titles and honors of a sovereign, and which committed the English government to persisting in its refusal, had its source much further afield. It is true that it was a weakness of Buonaparte's, stemming perhaps from the fact that he was a parvenu among the crowned heads of Europe, to show himself on all occasions excessively anxious and jealous that the strictest etiquette and the greatest ceremonial be observed at his court and towards his person. [...] He had already experienced on the island of Elba how useful it was for etiquette to put a barrier between his person and any visitor who might displease him.

== Etiquette ==
Etiquette at the French court underwent profound changes from the 16th century onwards (the Valois introduced Italian customs) and especially in the 17th century (with the addition of customs from the Spanish court).

== Day-to-day court administration ==
Privileged merchants and artisans following the court" (itinerant, then holding barracks when the court moved to Versailles) and the ‘king's ordinary merchants and artisans’ (fixed in specific locations), with patents of enjoyment or letters patent, were responsible for supplying the court with food (pork butchers, grocers), drink (lemonade makers, vinegar makers and distillers), supplies (gunsmiths, haberdashers, florists, cloth merchants, bundlers of wood, books) and services (wigmakers, ironers, upholsterers).

== Entertainment at court ==
The French court saw the successive development of several musical genres around ballet: the ballet de cour, the comédie-ballet, the opéra-ballet and the acte de ballet.

== In literature ==
=== Court memorialists ===
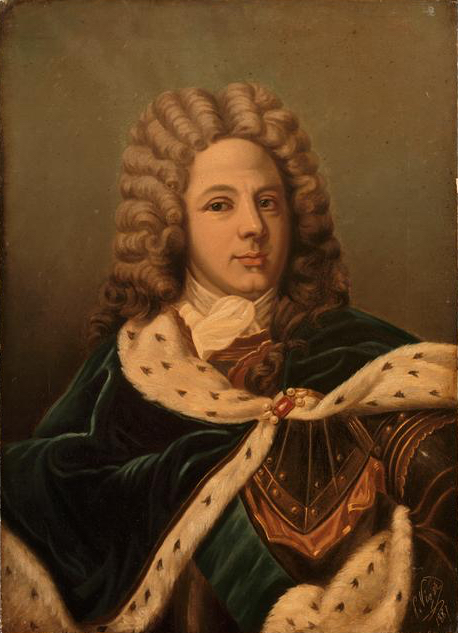
The Duc de Saint-Simon, famous memoirist of court life at Versailles under Louis XIV.

- Aliénor de Poitiers (Burgundy court in the 15th century);
- Brantôme (Renaissance);
- Françoise de Motteville (regency of Anne of Austria);
- Ézéchiel Spanheim (reign of Louis XIV, 1690);
- Roger de Bussy-Rabutin (reign of Louis XIV);
- Marie de Rabutin-Chantal, marquise de Sévigné (reign of Louis XIV);
- Philippe de Courcillon, Marquis de Dangeau (reign of Louis XIV);
- Louis de Rouvroy, duc de Saint-Simon (reign of Louis XIV, Regency);
- Jeanne Louise Henriette Campan (reign of Louis XVI, Revolution);
- Laure Junot, Duchesse d'Abrantès (Revolution, Empire and Restoration);
- Adèle d'Osmond, comtesse de Boigne (Restoration, July Monarchy);

=== The novels ===
- La Princesse de Clèves (1678), by Madame de La Fayette (court of Henri II);
- La Reine Margot (1845) by Alexandre Dumas (court of Charles IX).

== In film ==
- La Reine Margot (1994), by Patrice Chéreau after Alexandre Dumas (court of Charles IX);
- La Prise de pouvoir par Louis XIV (1966), by Roberto Rossellini (court of Louis XIV, beginning of personal reign);
- Ridicule (1996), by Patrice Leconte (court of Louis XVI);
- Marie-Antoinette (2006) by Sofia Coppola (court of Louis XVI).

== See also ==
- Palace of Versailles
- Tuileries Palace
- Levee (ceremony)

== Bibliography ==
- Akkerman, Nadine; Houben, Birgit, eds. (2013), The Politics of Female Households: Ladies-In-Waiting Across Early Modern Europe, Leiden: Brill
- Autrand, Françoise (1994). Charles V. Fayard.
- Boucher, Jacqueline (1981). "Société et mentalités autour de Henri III". Bibliothèque de l'École des Chartes. 1–4 (2). Lille: 319–321.
  - Reprint: Boucher, Jacqueline (2007). Société et mentalités autour de Henri III. Bibliothèque littéraire de la Renaissance / 3 (2nd ed.). Paris: Honoré Champion. p. 1273. ISBN 978-2-7453-1440-6.
- Boucher, Jacqueline (1986). La cour de Henri III, Rennes, Ouest-France. Ouest France. p. 213. ISBN 2-7373-0019-3.
- Boucher, Jacqueline (1996). "Un monde ouvert et influent : la Cour des derniers Valois". Cahiers Saint-Simon. Frontières de la Cour. Vol. 24. pp. 51–56. doi:10.3406/simon.1996.1237. ISSN 0409-8846.
- Bove, Boris (2009). "L'âge d'or curial de la fin du xive siècle". Le temps de la guerre de Cent ans : 1328-1453. Paris: Belin. pp. 189–233. ISBN 978-2-7011-3361-4.
- Bove, Boris (2003). "Les palais royaux à Paris au Moyen Age (XIe-XVe siècles)". In Auzepy, Marie-France; Cornette, J. (eds.). Palais et Pouvoir, de Constantinople à Versailles, Saint-Denis. Presses universitaires de Vincennes. pp. 45–79. ISBN 2-84292-131-3.
- Bove, Boris (2017). "Paris, ville de cour (xiiie-xviiie siècle)". In Gaude-Ferragu, Murielle; Michon, Cédric (eds.). Histoire. Aulica. L'univers de la cour. Rennes: Presses universitaires de Rennes. p. 384. ISBN 978-2-7535-5910-3.
- M. Bryant, Lawrence (2010). Ceremony and the Changing Monarchy in France, 1350–1789. Variorum Collected Studies Series. pp. VIII-340. ISBN 978-0-7546-6846-6.
- Chatenet, Monique (2002). La Cour de France au xvie siècle : vie sociale et architecture. De architectura. p. 387. ISBN 2-7084-0626-4.
- Coulet, Noël (2007). "Le temps des malheurs (1348-1440)". Histoire de la France des origines à nos jours. Larousse. ISBN 978-2-035-82636-7.
- Elias, Norbert (2008). "La société de cour" [Die höfische Gesellschaft]. Champs. Essais [Die höfische Gesellschaft] (in German). Translated by Kamnitzer, Pierre; Étoré, Jeanne. Flammarion. pp. LXXVII-330. ISBN 978-2-08-121802-4.
- Gaude-Ferragu, Murielle (2011). Laurioux, Bruno; Paviot, Jacques (eds.). La cour du prince : cour de France, cours d'Europe, xiie-xve siècle. Paris: Honoré Champion. p. 658. ISBN 978-2-7453-2244-9.
- Giesey, Ralph E. (1987). Cérémonial et puissance souveraine : France, xve-xviie siècles. Cahiers des Annales. Translated by Carlier, Jeannie Carlier. Armand Colin. p. 170. ISBN 2-7132-1036-4.
- Girault, Pierre-Gilles; Mercier, Mathieu, eds. (2010). Fêtes & crimes à la Renaissance : la cour d'Henri III mécène des arts, des sciences et des lettres. Somogy. p. 151. ISBN 978-2-7572-0379-8.
- Grell, Chantal; Pellistrandi, Benoît, eds. (2007). Les cours d'Espagne et de France au xviie siècle, Madrid, Casa de Velázquez. Collection de la Casa de Velázquez. Madrid: Casa de Velázquez. pp. XIX-331. ISBN 978-84-95555-78-6.
- Horowski, Leonhard (2019). Au cœur du palais : pouvoir et carrières à la cour de France, 1661–1789 [Die Belagerung des Thrones : Machtstrukturen und Karrieremechanismen am Hof von Frankreich, 1661-1789]. Translated by Niémetz, Serge Niémetz. Presses universitaires de Rennes. p. 466. ISBN 978-2-7535-7617-9.
- Hours, Bernard (2002). "Louis XV et sa cour : le roi, l'étiquette et le courtisan : essai historique". Le nœud gordien. Paris: Presses universitaires de France. p. 302. ISBN 2-13-051987-3.
- Kolk, Caroline zum (2009). "The Household of the Queen of France in the Sixteenth Century". The Court Historian. 14 (1).
- Lemarchand, Laurent (2014). "Paris ou Versailles ? La monarchie absolue entre deux capitales (1715-1723)". CTHS-Histoire. Paris: Éditions du Comité des travaux historiques et scientifiques. p. 401. ISBN 978-2-7355-0797-9.
- Le Roux, Nicolas (2001). La faveur du Roi : mignons et courtisans au temps des derniers Valois. Champ Vallon. p. 805. ISBN 2-87673-311-0.
  - Reprint: Le Roux, Nicolas (2013). La faveur du Roi : mignons et courtisans au temps des derniers Valois. Les classiques de Champ Vallon. Champ Vallon. p. 805. ISBN 978-2-87673-907-9.
- Le Roux, Nicolas (2003). "La cour dans l'espace du palais : l'exemple de Henri III". Palais et pouvoir, de Constantinople à Versailles, Saint-Denis, Presses universitaires de Vincennes: 229–267. ISBN 2-84292-131-3.
- Le Roux, Nicolas (2013). "Le Roi, la Cour, l'État : de la Renaissance à l'absolutisme". Époques. 671 (3): 675–748. doi:10.3917/rhis.143.0675. ISBN 978-2-87673-874-4.
- Lever, Évelyne (2012). Le temps des illusions : chronique de la Cour et de la Ville, 1715–1756. Paris: Fayard. p. 439. ISBN 978-2-213-66841-3.
- Masseau, Didier (2018). Fêtes et folies en France à la fin de l'Ancien Régime. Paris: CNRS Éditions. p. 301. ISBN 978-2-213-60205-9.
- Ritchey Newton, William (2000). L'espace du roi : la cour de France au château de Versailles, 1682-1789. Paris: Fayard. p. 588. ISBN 2-213-60205-0.
- Shishkin, Vladimir (2018). "Frantzuzski korolevski dvor v XVI veke. Istoria instituta [La Cour de France au xvie siècle. Histoire d'une institution]". Histoire, Économie & Société. 38e année (2): 131–140. doi:10.3917/hes.192.0131.
- Solnon, Jean-François (1987). "La Cour de France". Nouvelles études historiques. Paris: Fayard. p. 649. ISBN 2-213-02015-9.
  - Reprint: Solnon, Jean-François (2014). La Cour de France, Paris, Perrin (2nd ed.). Perrin. p. 866. ISBN 978-2-262-04252-3.
- Thépaut-Cabasset, Corinne, ed. (2010). "L'esprit des modes au Grand Siècle". Éditions du Comité des travaux historiques et scientifiques. CTHS format (66): 252. ISBN 978-2-7355-0715-3.
- Zum Kolk, Caroline; Wilson-Chevalier, Kathleen, eds. (2018). "Femmes à la cour de France : charges et fonctions, xve-xixe siècle, Villeneuve-d'Ascq". Histoire et civilisations: 404. ISBN 978-2-7574-2361-5.
