= Maison d'éducation de la Légion d'honneur =

Type of French boarding school

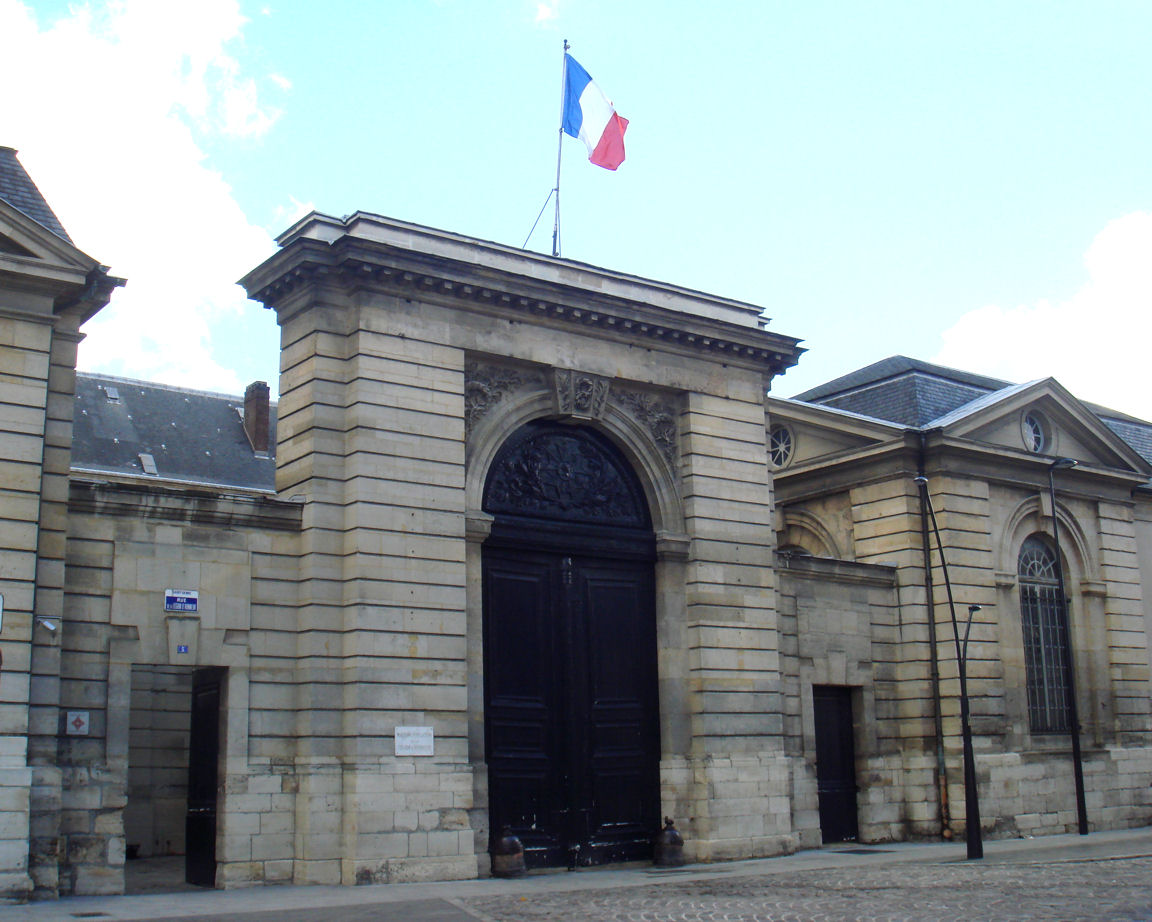
The Maison d'Éducation de la Légion d'Honneur at Saint-Denis.

The maisons d'éducation de la Légion d'honneur (French pronunciation: [mɛzɔ̃ dedykasjɔ̃ də la leʒjɔ̃ dɔnœʁ], lit. 'Legion of Honour education houses') are French secondary schools established by Napoleon and intended for the education of girls whose father, grandfather, or great-grandfather had been awarded the Legion of Honour. Admission is still granted by hereditary right.

== History ==
The maisons d'éducation de la Légion d'honneur are often compared to the Maison royale de Saint-Louis, a school founded by Madame de Maintenon in Saint-Cyr (now Saint-Cyr-l'École) and built by Jules Hardouin-Mansart. The Maison royale was later repurposed by Napoleon as a military academy for officers. He was familiar with the institution, as his sister Élisa Bonaparte had studied there before he withdrew her in 1792.

Several similarities have been noted between the two schools: both were associated with chivalric orders (the Legion of Honour and the earlier Order of Saint Louis), intended for the daughters of poor officers or noblemen, and organized into classes identified by colored ribbons.

Despite these parallels, Napoleon reportedly held a negative view of the Maison royale and sought to distinguish his own institutions from it. He is quoted as saying:

Take care not to follow the example of Saint-Cyr, where considerable amounts of money were spent, and where the girls were badly educated.

During the reign of Napoleon as Emperor of the French, numerous military schools were established to educate boys for service in the army. In contrast, girls' education was largely neglected, particularly after the National Convention had closed many convents, which had traditionally provided education for girls. To address this gap, Napoleon founded the maisons d'éducation de la Légion d'honneur to provide education and care for the daughters—many of them orphans—of his most distinguished soldiers.

Napoleon initially proposed the creation of a school for both the sons and daughters of soldiers killed in the Battle of Austerlitz. This project was formally presented on 7 December 1805 but was ultimately abandoned.

The decree establishing the maisons d'éducation de la Légion d'honneur was signed by Napoleon on 15 December 1805 at the Schönbrunn Palace. It authorized the creation of three schools for the daughters of members of the Legion of Honour, who could be admitted between the ages of 7 and 10 and remained until the age of 21.

Napoleon appointed Jeanne-Louise-Henriette Campan as headmistress of the first maison d'éducation. Campan had previously served as a reader to the daughters of Louis XV and as première femme de chambre to Marie Antoinette. Beginning in 1794, she operated a private boarding school for girls in Saint-Germain-en-Laye, where her pupils included Hortense de Beauharnais, Stéphanie de Beauharnais, Pauline Bonaparte, and Caroline Bonaparte. Although Campan advocated for the school to be located in Saint-Germain, Napoleon chose the Château d'Écouen, which had been transferred to the Legion of Honour on 6 July 1806.

In a letter dated 15 May 1807, Napoleon outlined the educational philosophy he envisioned for the institutions:

Élevez-nous des croyantes et non des raisonneuses (Bring up for us believers and no thinkers)

He called for a simple curriculum intended to "master vanity, which is the most active passion of the [female] gender," aiming to educate the students to become modest wives and mothers.

On 25 March 1809, Napoleon signed a decree establishing a second maison d'éducation de la Légion d'honneur at the Basilica of Saint-Denis, which had become state property in 1790. The school was officially inaugurated on 1 July 1811, and the first boarders were admitted in 1812.

On 15 July 1810, another imperial decree created the maisons d'orphelines de la Légion d'honneur, intended for the orphaned daughters of members of the Legion of Honour, regardless of military rank or order grade. These institutions were managed by nuns of the Congrégation de la Mère de Dieu. Three such schools were established: one in the Hôtel de Corberon in Paris (opened in winter 1811), one in the former convent of the Augustines at Les Loges in Saint-Germain-en-Laye (opened in spring 1812), and another at the Abbaye de Barbeaux in Fontainebleau (opened in July 1813). A decree issued by Louis XVIII on 19 July 1814 ordered the closure of these schools, but following a petition by officers' widows, they were reopened on 17 September 1814—except for the Barbeaux school, which remained closed.

In 1821, the schools were reorganized: the Saint-Denis institution admitted only the daughters of superior officers, while the others, classified as annexes, admitted daughters of lower-ranking soldiers.

In 1881, the Jules Ferry laws on secular education required religious institutions to become non-denominational. By 1890, the maisons d'éducation began to follow differentiated curricula: Les Loges provided manual and vocational training, Écouen prepared students for commercial and teaching careers, while Saint-Denis focused on advanced academic studies.

In 1920, the schools adopted the same curriculum as the national lycée system. Younger students were educated at Les Loges, older students at Écouen, and the eldest at Saint-Denis. This structure remains in place: Les Loges follows the collège (middle school) curriculum, while Saint-Denis functions as a lycée (upper secondary school).

== Schools ==
=== Écouen ===
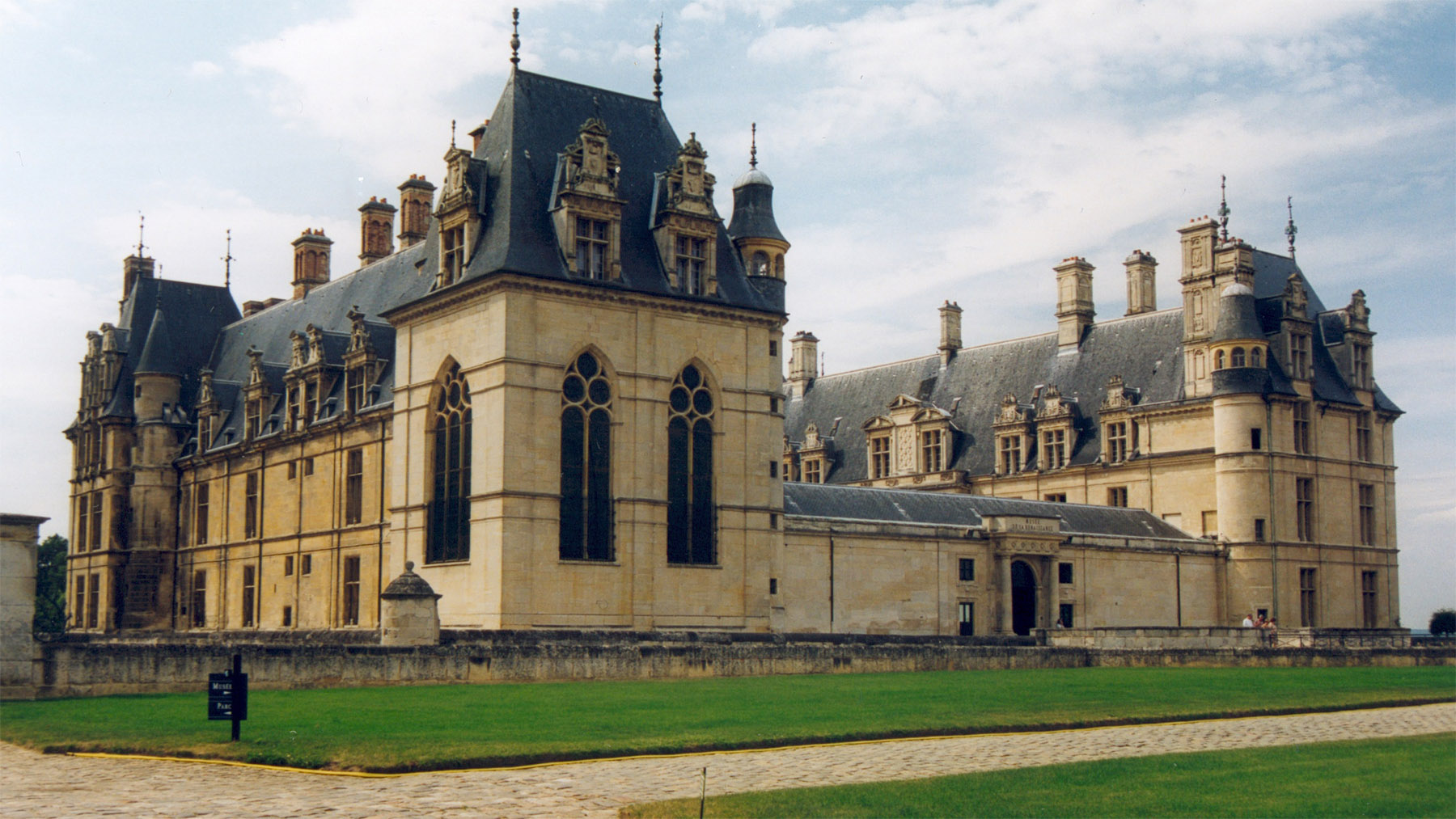
The "château d'Écouen"

The "Château d'Écouen" was the place where the first Maison d'éducation de la Légion d'Honneur was founded. It welcomed its first boarders on November 17, 1807, with Jeanne-Louise-Henriette Campan being the headmistress of the school, having been appointed by Napoleon on September 5, 1807. Yet, the first rules of the school were only published in 1809.

In 1814, King Louis XVIII gave the castle back to the Princes of Condé, who left it uninhabited from 1830; the castle's property was transferred back to the Légion d'honneur in 1838.

In 1851, the former "Maison des orphelines de la Légion d'honneur" of the "Hôtel de Corberon" in Paris, which had become an "annex" of the school of Saint-Denis in 1821, was moved to the Château d'Écouen by Napoleon III.

In 1962, the Grand Chancellor of the Légion d'honneur closed the school of Écouen and gave the castle to the Ministry of Culture, to make it the National Museum of the Renaissance.

=== Saint-Denis ===
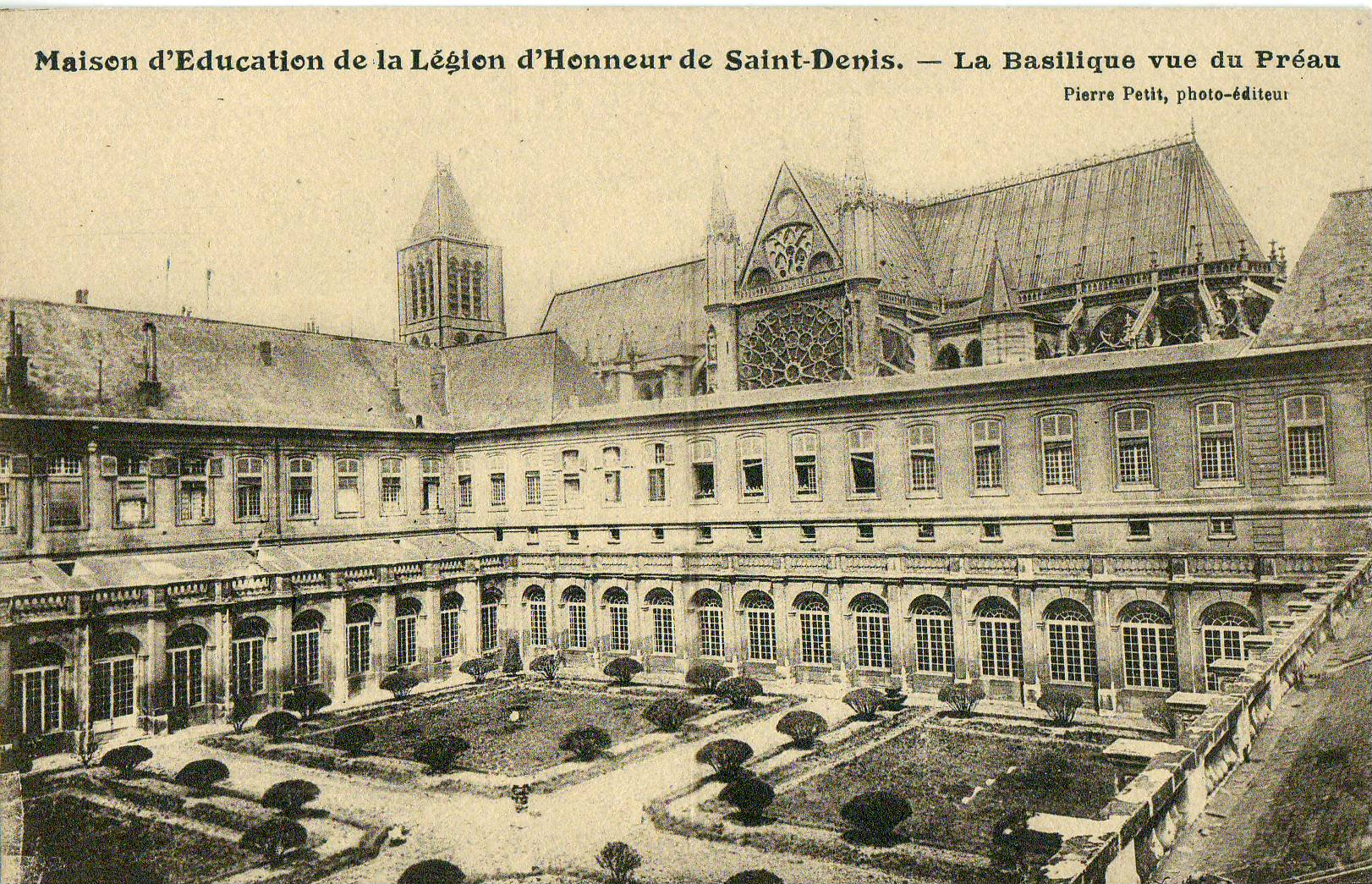
A view of the school of Saint-Denis, set near the Basilica.

Inaugurated on July 1, 1811, the Maison d'éducation de la Légion d'honneur of Saint-Denis was ruled by Madame du Bouzet, the widow of a colonel dead at the Battle of Jemappes. The first boarders came in 1812.

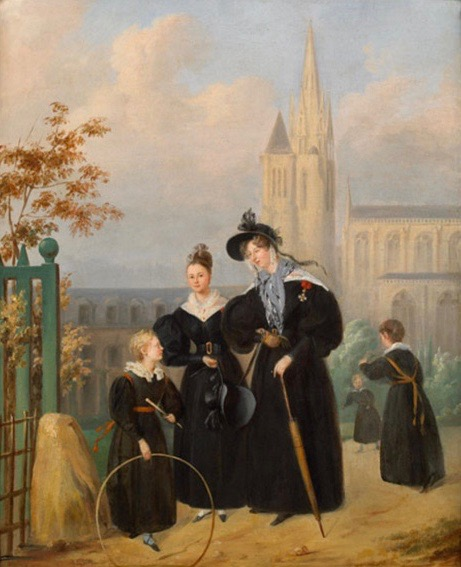
Teachers and pupils of the Maison d'éducation de la Légion d'Honneur de Saint-Denis, 1840s

From 1820 to 1837, the headmistress was Marie-Benoîte-Joséphine de Prévost de la Croix.

On September 1, 1989, Saint-Denis opened a class of "Lettres Supérieures" (also called hypokhâgne), and on September 1, 1994, a class of "Première Supérieure" (khâgne) followed. On September 1, 1990, the school opened a class of "Brevet de Technicien Supérieur" (BTS) in international business, with an option of preparation to business schools.

Nowadays the school, set in the cloister of the former Basilica of St Denis, has about 500 pupils of lycée and the classes of hypokhâgne, khâgne and BTS.

The buildings are not opened to public but can be visited during the European Heritage Days. The school buildings are sometimes used to shoot films : for example, it was used to represent the "Institut des Aveugles de Duroc" in the French film Les Femmes de l'ombre.

The refectory holds a painting called Le Martyre de saint Denis, de saint Eleuthère et de saint Rustique from the Flemish painter Caspar de Crayer.

=== Les Loges ===
In 1811, at the arrival of its first boarders, the "Maison d'orphelines de la Légion d'honneur" of "Les Loges" in Saint-Germain-en-Laye was ruled by Madame de Lezeau, a superior of the "Congrégation de la Mère de Dieu". In 1814, King Louis XVIII closed the "Maisons d'orphelines", but the school was re-opened the same year, and in 1821 it became a Maison d'éducation annex to Saint-Denis.

In the forest of Saint-Germain-en-Laye, near the Camp des Loges, the school houses about 500 students of collège.

== Conditions of admission ==
The maisons d'éducation de la Légion d'honneur are public, non-religious, girls-only boarding schools. Although secular in nature, they provide Catholic and Protestant chaplaincy services for boarders who wish to practice their faith.

Admission is open, in order of priority, to:

- Daughters, granddaughters, and great-granddaughters of members of the Legion of Honour
- Daughters, granddaughters, and great-granddaughters of recipients of the Médaille militaire
- Daughters, granddaughters, and great-granddaughters of members of the Ordre national du Mérite
- Daughters and granddaughters of foreign members of the Legion of Honour (subject to the approval of the Grand Master of the Legion of Honour)

Applicants must be at least 10 years old at the time of admission. The following maximum age limits apply based on school level:

- 12 years old for entry into sixième
- 13 years old for cinquième
- 14 years old for quatrième
- 15 years old for troisième
- 16 years old for seconde
- 17 years old for première
- 18 years old for terminale

For the 2007–2008 academic year, school fees were €1,740 per year for secondary classes and €1,902 per year for post-secondary ("supérieur") classes. Fees are paid in three equal installments per trimester, and each trimester must be paid in full even if the student withdraws early.

Scholarships are not accepted; however, families with limited income may receive fee reductions based on their financial situation.

Applications must be submitted by 15 March for post-secondary classes and by 15 April for secondary classes. Admission decisions are typically communicated around 15 May.

== Boarding school ==
All students are boarders. The boarding school is closed on weekends, and each secondary student must have a local guardian (correspondant) residing in the Île-de-France region, responsible for picking the student up on weekends and during holidays. Post-secondary students may either continue as boarders—with permission to leave the school independently—or enroll as internes externées, meaning they take meals at the school but live off-campus.

== Uniforms ==
Uniform of a student in terminale.

School uniform is compulsory in all Maisons d'éducation de la Légion d'honneur. The uniform changed several times since the school's creation; its last modification was in September 2007.

The uniform is composed of a navy blue sleeveless dress, and a white blouse with short sleeves in summer and long sleeves in winter. The uniform is tied with a sash whose color represents the student's class :

- green in sixième
- violet in cinquième
- "aurore" (orange) in quatrième
- blue in troisième
- "nacarat" (red) in seconde
- white in première
- multicolored (with all colors of the lower grades) in terminale

Students also wear a beret and a navy blue coat with golden buttons to go out.

Students often call a fellow student or a class of the Maisons d'éducation de la Légion d'honneur using the color of the sash : for example a student in sixième can be called "une verte" (a green), the class of troisième can be called "les bleues" (the blue).

Students of superior classes wear a navy blue suit with a badge; the badge is yellow in khâgne and blue in the "Brevet de technicien supérieur" class.

The uniform can be purchased when the student enters the school, and like the school fees, it is paid in three thirds at the beginning of each trimester, even if the family is granted reduced school fees. In schoolyear 2007-2008, it cost €438 for a secondary school student and €408 for a superior class student.

== Education ==
Article R122 of the "Code de la Légion d'honneur" says :

L'éducation donnée dans les maisons d'éducation a pour but d'inspirer aux élèves l'amour de la patrie et de la liberté ainsi que le sens de leurs devoirs civiques et familiaux et de les préparer, par leur instruction et la formation de leur caractère, à s'assurer une existence digne et indépendante. (Education given in the Maisons d'éducation de la Légion d'honneur aims to make the students feel love of their country and of freedom, as well as the meaning of their civic and familial duties, and to prepare them, by instructing them and forming their character, to ensure a proper and independent living.)

The Maisons d'éducation de la Légion d'honneur follow the curriculum of the French "Éducation nationale". The teachers are appointed to the Grand Chancellor by the Ministry of Education.

Each collège grade has a "choir" option, where students are given extra lessons in choral singing and learn to play different music instruments. The school also holds studios where the students can play music freely when they have no lessons. The choir students take part in concerts and sing in official ceremonies. Each year, they give the "Concert présidentiel" or "Concert du président" to the President of France or his representative.

Much importance is given to foreign languages in the curriculum : from the sixième, two languages (English and German) can be studied, and Chinese can be studied from the cinquième. Foreign languages are also taught through stays in foreign countries : the school of Saint-Denis makes its students take part in 4-week, total immersion stays.

The lycée in Saint-Denis offers different streams to prepare to baccalauréat :

- Littéraire (literary) with specialization in foreign languages (English, German, Spanish, Russian, Ancient Greek, Latin), specialization in mathematics or specialization in arts (arts & crafts or music)
- Scientifique (sciences) with specialization in mathematics, specialization in physics & chemistry, or specialization in earth & life science
- Économique et sociale (economics and social sciences) with specialization in foreign languages (English or German), specialization in mathematics, or specialization in economics & social sciences
- Science et technologie de la gestion (science & technology in management) with specialization in business action & communication (baccalauréat technologique)

The lycée also prepares to TOEFL and (until schoolyear 2007-2008) to the admission in the Institut d'études politiques in Paris.

=== Exams results ===
From 2011, last year students (Terminale) of the Maison d'Éducation de la Légion d'Honneur achieve a 100% success rate in the baccalauréat with more than 60% of the students getting first-class honours (mention Très Bien) since 2014. These results made the Maison d'Éducation de la Légion d'Honneur the top-school in France in 2015, according to Le Figaro.

== Organization ==
The Maisons d'éducation de la Légion d'honneur are directly under the authority of the Grand Chancellor of the Légion d'honneur. The functions at the schools are called differently from in normal schools :

Functions names in Maisons d'éducation de la Légion d'honneur and in French Éducation nationale
Maisons d'éducation de la Légion d'honneur	Éducation nationale
Surintendante	Proviseur de cité scolaire
Intendante générale	Principal(e) de collège
Proviseur adjoint & Directeur/trice des études	Proviseur adjoint
Censeur	Principal(e) adjoint(e)
Économe	Intendant(e)
Inspectrice	CPE

The Maisons d'éducation de la Légion d'honneur have as a motto "Honneur et Patrie", while French schools follow the motto of the French Republic : "Liberté, Égalité, Fraternité".

Each class is followed throughout the schoolyear by a "chargée d'éducation" ("lady in charge of education" : though the job is opened to men, actually only women do it). The lady in charge of education manages her class when they have no lessons : in homeroom, during the meals (which are served in the school refectory) and during school outings (visits at the museum, concerts, etc.). They can also give their classes pedagogical activities with the help of their teachers.

Students are accommodated in dormitories, each dormitory hosting 2 or 3 classes, which makes from 40 to 70 students. Dormitories are managed and watched by the "maîtresses d'internat" ("boarding mistresses"), who can punish students having a bad behavior at the dormitory. Punishments are noted by "crosses" (five crosses are worth extra work, ten cross a temporary change of dormitory, twenty crosses a definitive change of dormitory).

The schoolyear at the Maisons d'éducation de la Légion d'honneur contains several ceremonies : apart from the "concert présidentiel" cited above, the "lecture du rapport" is held before each school holiday, and is an announcement of all students' results. Students with good results or good behavior are awarded "medals" and a traditional party is organized until 10 p.m. for students of sixième and cinquième, until 11 p.m. for students of quatrième and troisième. At the end of the schoolyear, an awards ceremony is presided by a personality and by the Grand Chancellor of the Légion d'honneur.

== Twin schools ==
The Maison d'éducation de la Légion d'honneur of Saint-Denis is twinned with :

- Gymnasium Max-Joseph-Stift in Munich, Germany
- Uppingham School, England
- Odivelas Institute in Lisbon, Portugal
- Maison d'éducation de Mariama Bâ on the Gorée Island, Senegal

== Trivia ==
In 2002, the bicentenary of the Légion d'honneur led to a special event : during the Bastille Day Military Parade, students from the Maisons d'éducation de la Légion d'honneur formed a giant fabric puzzle representing the cross of the Légion d'honneur on the Place de la Concorde, in front of the presidential tribune. Then the students and their families were invited by the Grand Chancellor to a dinner with the Cadets of the United States Military Academy (who were also at the parade), and then watched the fireworks on the Champ de Mars.
