= François Augustin Regnier de Jarjayes =

French royalist noble (1745–1822)

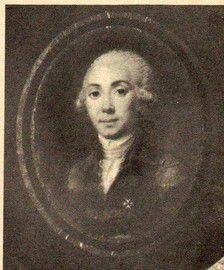

Personal details
- Born: 2 October 1745 Upaix, Hautes-Alpes, Kingdom of France
- Died: 11 September 1822 (aged 76) Fontenay-aux-Roses, Hauts-de-Seine, Kingdom of France

Military service
- Allegiance: France; Sardinia
- Branch/service: French Royal Army; Royal Sardinian Army
- Years of service: 1769–1815
- Rank: Lieutenant general
- Battles/wars: French Revolutionary and Napoleonic Wars

François Augustin Regnier de Jarjayes (1745–1822) was a French royalist officer who served under both the Kingdom of France and Kingdom of Sardinia during the Revolutionary and Napoleonic wars.

== Biography ==
Coat of arms of the Jarjayes family.

Jarjayes was born in 1745 in the commune of Upaix, Hautes-Alpes, France. His parents were the royal notary Jean-Antoine Reynier, Lord of Jarjayes, and Marguerite Nicollet.

He began his military career in 1769, helping in the work of Pierre-Joseph Bourcet, later becoming his aide-de-camp until his promotion to colonel in 1779. In 1770, Jarjayes married Bourcet's niece, Marie-Anne Louise Bourcet de la Saigne, having two children with her. After his wife's death in 1786, he remarried to Louise Marguerite Émilie Henriette Quetpée de Laborde, a lady's maid of Marie Antoinette. In 1791, he was decorated with the Order of Saint Louis by Louis XVI, and with the trust of the king, he was given assignments abroad. He was promoted to the rank of brigadier general in 1792.

In 1793, Jarjayes, alongside François Adrien Toulan, Jacques François Lepitre and other royalists, launched an attempt to rescue Marie Antoinette from the Enclos du Temple. The scheme involved embarking at Le Havre for England, before departing for Germany, but was ultimately a failure. He was also a co-conspirator in the unsuccessful Carnation Plot, a ploy involving a meeting between Marie Antoinette and Madame de Jarjayes at Livry-Gargan, attempting to escort Antoinette to Germany.

Under Marie Antoinette's orders, Jarjayes traveled to Turin in 1793 to deliver relics of Louis XVI to the Count of Provence and other relatives of the king. He was appointed aide-de-camp by Victor Amadeus III in 1793, and became a member of the Royal Sardinian Army. He returned to France while it was under the consulate, and in 1815 he was granted the rank of lieutenant general by Louis XVIII under the Bourbon Restoration.

He died in 1822.

== In popular culture ==
Jarjayes is depicted as the father of Oscar François de Jarjayes in the 1972 manga series The Rose of Versailles, as well as its various adaptations and spin-offs.
