= Julie Louise Bibault de Misery =

French court official (1732 – 1804)

- Born: 1732
- Died: 1804 (aged 71–72)
- Occupation: French court official

Julie Louise Bibault de Misery née de Chemault (1732-1804) was a French court official. She was the Première femme de Chambre to the queen of France between 1765 and 1786 (first to Marie Leczinska, then to Marie Antoinette).

== Life ==
Julie de Misery was the daughter of Jacques and Marguerite de Beaucousin. She married the court official Charles François Bibault de Misery in 1750, and had issue.

She belonged to a family that had a tradition of serving the royal family. In 1765 she was named femme du chambre (chambermaid) to queen Marie Leczinska, and succeeded her aunt Marie Marguerite Bibault as Première femme de Chambre. After the queen's death in 1768, de Misery was transferred to the household of the new crown princess, Marie Antoinette, in 1770. She was an ally of the Madame de Noailles, and Marie Antoinette referred to Madame de Noailles as Madame Eiquette and Julie de Misery as l'impératrice reine ('Empress Queen') to acknowledge the ladies' adherence on formal etiquette. When Marie Antoinette first arrived at the French court she was pleased with the presence of Julie de Misery's children, whom she enjoyed to play with, thereby breaking the etiquette rules.

In 1774 Marie Antoinette became queen, and the following year the office of Première femme de Chambre was split in four between de Misery and her three deputies, Henriette Campan, Marie-Élisabeth Thibault, and Louise Quetpée de Laborde. They took turns serving for a quarter of the year (or three months) each, and all four were still in service when the queen's household was dissolved in 1792, at that time in supervision of six chambermaids.

de Misery was pointed out as a political intriguer at court, and claimed to be an ally of Paul François de Quélen de la Vauguyon and an agent of the Jesuits and the Devots. In the 1780s, Julie de Misery was implicated in the Affair of the Diamond Necklace by Jeanne de Valois-Saint-Rémy, who claimed that Julie was her contact at court. In 1788, when there was a need to cut the costs of the royal household, Henriette Campan and Julie de Misery belonged to those that protested, and were allowed to keep what was considered to be much too high salaries. She made huge profits during her career at court despite only serving for three months of the year, and used part of her generous salary to pay for a hugely expensive castle in Biaches. The construction of the castle drained such costs that it became a public topic of provocation, but went on from 1775 until the French revolution and the cut of her salary. The lack of funds forced her to not only interrupt the building of the castle, but to eventually tear it down.

== Fiction ==
Julie de Misery was portrayed in The Queen's Necklace by Alexandre Dumas.
