= Louise Emmanuelle de Châtillon, Princesse de Tarente =

French noble, memoirist and court official

Louise Emmanuelle de Châtillon
- Princess of Tarante
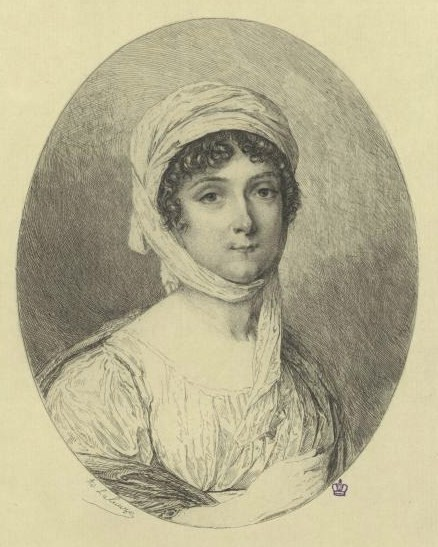
- Born: 23 July 1763
- Died: 22 June 1814 (aged 50); Saint Petersburg, Russia
- Spouses: Charles Bretagne Marie de La Trémoille, Prince of Tarente (m 10 July 1781)
- Father: Louis Gaucher, 2nd Duke of Châtillon
- Mother: Adrienne de la Baume le Blanc, Duchess of La Vallière

Louise Emmanuelle de Châtillon, known as Princesse de Tarente (1763–1814) was a French noble, memoirist and court official. She served as lady-in-waiting (Dame du Palais) to queen Marie Antoinette of France from 1782 to 1792. Her memoirs about her life during the French Revolution have been published.

== Life ==
Louise Emmanuelle de Châtillon was born to Louis Gaucher, Duke of Châtillon, and Adrienne Emilie Félicité de la Baume le Blanc. She was a grand daughter of Louis César de La Baume Le Blanc, the famous writer.

In 1781, she married Charles Bretagne Marie de La Trémoille, Prince of Tarente and heir to the Duke of Thouars. The couple had one daughter, Charlotte (26 October 1788 – 15 February 1791).

In 1786, she was appointed one of 15 dame du palais to queen Marie Antoinette.

=== Revolution ===
After the outbreak of the French Revolution, her spouse emigrated and joined the émigré army under the Prince of Condé. Louise-Emmanuelle accompanied the royal family from Versailles to Paris after the Women's March on Versailles in October 1789, and continued to serve the queen in the Tuileries.

Reportedly, she was perhaps the female colleague with whom the princesse de Lamballe was most friendly, and was a frequent guest of Lamballe's salon in the Pavillon de Flore, where Lamballe was known to recruit aristocratic loyalist contacts for the royal cause.

During the Demonstration of 20 June 1792, she, alongside Princess de Lamballe, Madame de Tourzel, the Duchess de Maillé, Mme de La Roche-Aymon, Marie Angélique de Mackau, Renée Suzanne de Soucy, Madame de Ginestous, and a few noblemen, belonged to the courtiers surrounding the queen and her children for several hours when the mob passed by the room shouting insults to Marie Antoinette.

=== The 10 August ===
During the 10 August (French Revolution), she and the rest of the ladies-in-waiting of the queen was left in the queen's chamber after the royal family left the palace only in the company of Princess of Lamballe and Madame de Tourzel. According to Madame de Campan, the Princesse de Tarente was devastated to be left in the palace, but still managed to compose herself enough to open the doors to the chamber to the mob. This convinced the mob that the royal family was not there and that there was no need from them to break in, which may have saved the life of the women.

When the mob entered to chamber where the ladies-in-waiting were gathered, the Princesse de Tarente, according to Pauline de Tourzel, approached one of the revolutionaries and asked for his protection. Reportedly, when the rebels entered the queen' bedchamber, the lady-in-waiting of the princesse de Lamballe, countess de Ginestous, became hysterical, fallen on her knees and begged for mercy, upon which the Princesse de Tarente, herself composed, had turned to the young Marseillais who led the rioters and said: "This poor lady is, as you see, hysterical: will you kindly see her to a place of safety; And this young girl also", indicating Pauline de Tourzel, "I confide to your honour; kill me if you will, but treat her with respect", upon which he replied: "We do not fight with women; go, all of you, if you choose." According to Pauline de Tourzel, he then escorted her and Princesse de Tarente out. Following this example, the rest of the ladies-in-waiting departed the palace in about the same way, and all passed safely out.

de Tarente and Pauline de Tourzel was escorted from the palace by the rebel, who left them on the street; where they were discovered by a mob who brought them to prison. The prison director allowed them to leave, and de Tarente brought Pauline de Tourzel with her to her grandmother, from which she could later be united with her mother.

=== The September Massacres ===
Because she was known as a personal confidante of the Princesse de Lamballe, who was suspected of having recruited contacts for the royal absolutist cause in her salon, de Tarente was arrested and interrogated regarding the people she met in the salon of the princesse de Lamballe at the Tuileries. She denied having participated in or having been aware of any treasonous plots, and after having refused to testify to any treasonous acts committed by Marie Antoinette, she was detained in prison from 27 August onward.

Because of this, she was still in the prison de l'Abbaye during the September Massacres, when people's tribunals summarily trialed and executed the inmates in the prisons of Paris. The prison staff, however, tried to subdue the violence as much as possible, particularly in regard to the female prisoners of prison de l'Abbaye, of which only two out of 200 women prisoners where ultimately executed. In the case of de Tarente, she was escorted to the tribunal by prison staff intending to protect her, and was particularly assisted by one Monsieur Chancy, who told her what to say so as to turn the tribunal sentence to her advantage. She answered that she had been imprisoned since 27 August; that she had been interrogated and her home searched since but no incriminating evidence had been presented against her, and that she was separated from her husband and did not know where he was nor cared of it.

She was acquitted from all charges by the people's tribunal and escorted home to her mother at the Hotel de Châtillon.

=== Later life ===
During the Reign of Terror in 1793, de Tarente emigrated to England and lived on a pension given to her by the sister of Marie Antoinette, Maria Carolina of Austria. In 1795, she unsuccessfully applied for a position as lady-in-waiting to Marie Thérèse of France.

She left England in company of her brother-in-law Marie François Emmanuel de Crussol for the court of Russia around March 1797, where she was a dame d'honneur of the tsarina Maria Feodorovna.

She returned to France in 1801, and remained for three years, but she did not wish to live there because of the traumatic memories of the revolution, and preferred to return and spend the rest of her life in Russia, where she was a central figure in the circles of the French emigres around countess Varvara Golovina.

== Works ==
- Souvenirs de la princesse de Tarente, 1789-1792
