= Louise Quetpée de Laborde =

Louise-Marguerite-Émilie-Henriette Quetpée de Laborde, Madame de Jarjayes (1760–1837), was a French courtier. She was a lady's maid to queen Marie Antoinette. She served as one of the four Première femme de chambre to the queen.

== Early life ==
She was born to Louis-Mathieu Quetpée de Laborde, huissier ordinaire du Cabinet de la Reine, and Marie-Louise Pecquet. She married first in 1773 to the queen's harp player Philippe-Joseph Hinner (d. 1784), and secondly in 1787 to general nobleman François-Augustin Régnier de Jarjayes (d. 1822).

She was one of the four Première femme de chambre to Marie-Antoinette in 1776-1792. The office of Première femme de Chambre was divided between four people: Julie Louise Bibault de Misery and the three deputies (survivancière) Henriette Campan, Marie-Élisabeth Thibault and Louise Quetpée de Laborde, who oversaw the chamber staff of the queen.

== During the revolution ==
During the French revolution, her husband was asked by the king and queen to remain in Paris instead of emigrating, and actively engaged n contra revolutionary activity. Her close position to the queen enabled her to act as the go-between and messenger between the queen and the royalist contra revolutionaries. She is not mentioned in connection to the Insurrection of 10 August 1792 or the September massacres, and may not have been present at the Palace at the time.

During the Reign of Terror in January 1793, Marie Antoinette contacted her husband via Jean-Baptiste Toulan. Together, they prepared a plan to resque Marie Antoinette from Temple Prison, with Louise acting as the go-between, entering the prison dressed as a washer woman. In February 1793, a police report described how the Jarjay couple conspired with Marie-Élisabeth Thibault and Marie-Thérèse Delalain de Navarre in an escape plan to free Marie Antoinette from prison. After the failure of this plan, her husband fled abroad, while Louise Quetpée de Laborde herself appear to have fled to her father in Livry.

In another escape plan, the Complot de l'Œillet, on 2–3 september 1793, the plan was for Marie Antoinette to be taken from prison to hide in the home of Louise Quetpée de Laborde before she could be smuggled out of the country. In October 1793, Marie Antoinette willed some memory items to her under the name ”citoyenne Laborde”. She was arrested and imprisoned for six weeks in the Madelonnettes prison.

In february 1794, she divorced her exiled husband. The same months, however, she as well as her daughter and son-in-law were all arrested and imprisoned as the relatives of an emigree in the Couvent des Anglaises in Livry until the fall of Robespierre in July 1794.
