= Upaix =

- Commune
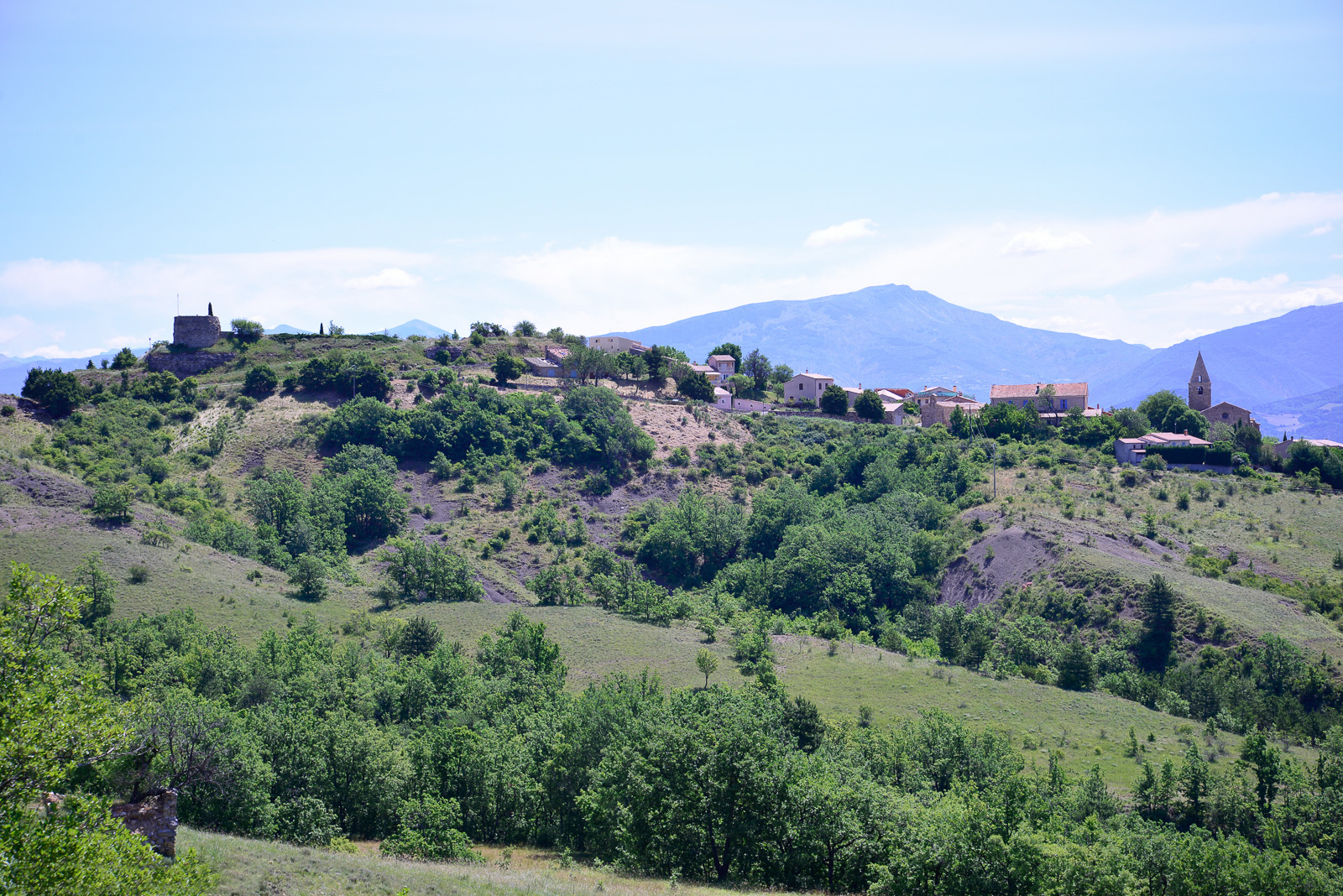
- A general view of the village

- Coat of arms
- Location of Upaix
- Location within France Location within Provence-Alpes-Côte d'Azur
- Coordinates: 44°19′07″N 5°52′32″E
- Country: France
- Region: Provence-Alpes-Côte d'Azur
- Department: Hautes-Alpes
- Arrondissement: Gap
- Canton: Laragne-Montéglin

Government
  - Mayor (2026–32): Florent Martin
- Area^{1}: 23.26 km^{2} (8.98 sq mi)
- Elevation: 720 m (2,360 ft)
- Highest elevation: 757 m (2,484 ft)
- Lowest elevation: 494 m (1,621 ft)
- Population (2023): 494
  - Density: 21.2/km^{2} (55.0/sq mi)
- Time zone: UTC+01:00 (CET)
  - Summer (DST): UTC+02:00 (CEST)
- INSEE/Postal code: 05173 /05300
- ^{1} French Land Register data, which excludes lakes, ponds, glaciers > 1 km^{2} (0.386 sq mi or 247 acres) and river estuaries.

Upaix (French pronunciation: [ypɛks]; Occitan: Upàis) is a commune in the Hautes-Alpes department in southeastern France.

== Administration ==
Mayors:

- 2008–2014: Charles Aillaud
- 2014–2020: Abel Jouve
- 2020–incumbent: Florent Martin

== Population ==
Historical population
Year	Pop.	±% p.a.
1968	328	—
1975	331	+0.13%
1982	284	−2.16%
1990	359	+2.97%
1999	376	+0.52%
2007	407	+1.00%
2012	431	+1.15%
2017	450	+0.87%
2023	494	+1.57%
Source: INSEE

== See also ==
- Communes of the Hautes-Alpes department
