= Henriette Campan =

French Lady's maid (1752–1822)

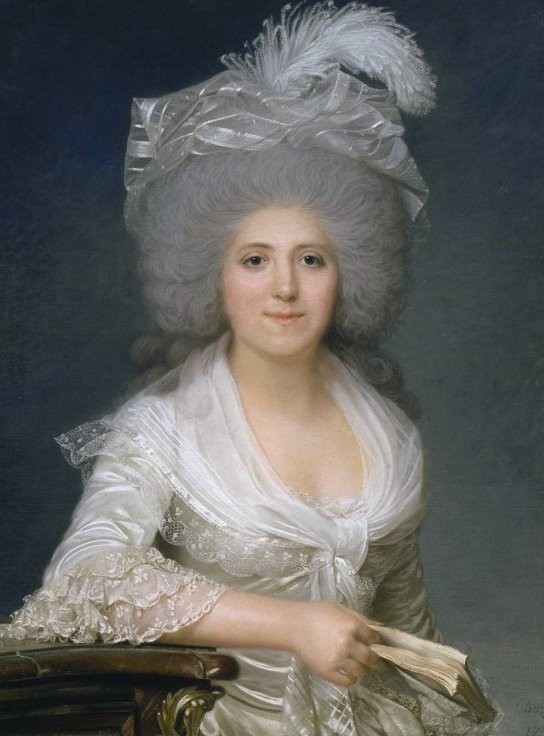
- Portrait of Henriette Campan by Joseph Boze, 1786
- Born: Jeanne Louise Henriette Genet; 6 October 1752; Paris, Kingdom of France
- Died: 16 March 1822 (aged 69); Mantes, Kingdom of France
- Occupations: lady's maid, educator
- Known for: reader to Madame Victoire, Madame Sophie and Madame Louise
- Spouse: Pierre-Dominique-François Berthollet Campan (1774; separated 1790)

Henriette Campan (Jeanne Louise Henriette; née Genet; 2 October 1752 – 16 March 1822) also known as Madame Campan, was a French educator, writer and Lady's maid. In the service of Marie Antoinette before and during the French Revolution, she was afterwards headmistress of the first Maison d'éducation de la Légion d'honneur, appointed by Napoleon in 1807 to promote the education of girls.

== Biography ==
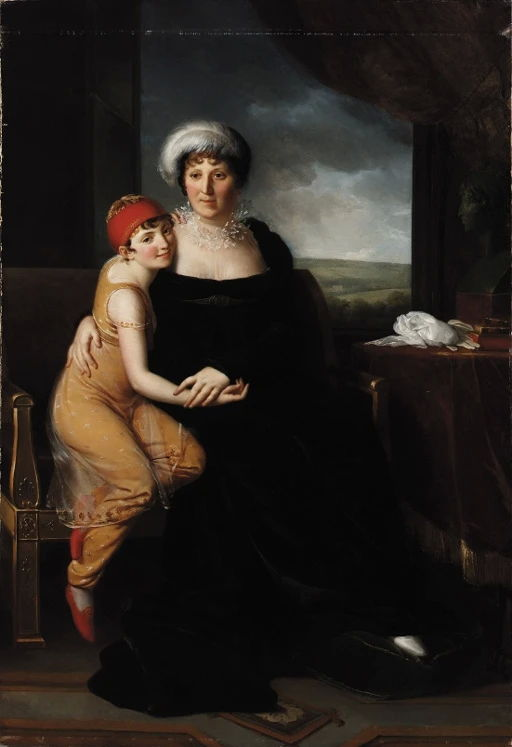
Portrait of Campan and student by Marie-Éléonore Godefroid

She was the daughter of Edme-Jacques Genet and Marie-Anne-Louise Cardon. Her father was the highest-ranking clerk in the foreign office (the ambassador Citizen Genet was her younger brother), and, although without fortune, placed her in the most cultivated society.

By the age of fifteen she could speak English and Italian, and had gained so high a reputation for her academic accomplishments as to be appointed reader to Louis XV's daughters (Mesdames Victoire, Sophie, and Louise) in 1768, and Femme de chambre to Marie Antoinette in 1770. Her sister Adélaïde Auguié had the same position.

She was a general favourite at court, and when in 1774 she bestowed her hand upon Pierre-Dominique-François Berthollet Campan, son of the secretary of the royal cabinet, the king gave her an annuity of 5,000 livres as dowry. The marriage was unhappy and the couple separated in 1790. Campan was promoted to Première femme de Chambre by Marie Antoinette in 1786; she shared the office with Julie Louise Bibault de Misery, Marie-Élisabeth Thibault and Louise Quetpée de Laborde, who oversaw the chamber staff of the queen.

She continued to attend on her until the 10 August 1792 storming of the Tuileries Palace, in which she was left behind in the palace when the queen and the royal family left prior to the storming. With her own house pillaged and burned that day, Henriette sought asylum in the countryside.

She survived the Reign of Terror, but after the 9th of Thermidor, finding herself almost penniless, and being thrown on her own resources by the illness of her spouse, Campan determined to support herself by in 1794 establishing a school at Saint-Germain-en-Laye. The institution prospered, and was patronized by Hortense de Beauharnais, whose influence led to the appointment of Campan as superintendent of the academy founded by Napoleon at Écouen for the education of the orphaned daughters of members of his Légion d'honneur in 1807. She held this post until it was abolished at the restoration of the Bourbons in 1814, when she retired to Mantes, where she spent the rest of her life amid the kind attentions of friends, but saddened by the loss of her only son, and by the calumnies circulated on account of her connection with the Bonapartes.

== Legacy ==
Henriette Campan died in 1822, leaving valuable Memoirs of the Private Life of Marie Antoinette (published 1823 (posthumously), Paris, 3 vols.), subtitled To which are Added Personal Recollections Illustrative of the Reigns of Louis XIV, Louis XV, and Louis XVI (French: Mémoires sur la vie privée de Marie Antoinette, suivis de souvenirs et anecdotes historiques sur les règnes de Louis XIV – XV); a treatise De l'Education des Femmes (pub. 1824); and one or two small didactic works, written in a clear and natural style. The most noteworthy thing in her educational system, and that which especially recommended it to Napoleon, was the place given to domestic economy in the education of girls. At Écouen the pupils underwent a complete training in all branches of housework.

== Quotes ==
The Queen’s toilet was a masterpiece of etiquette; everything was done in a prescribed form. Both the Dame d'honneur and the dame d’atours usually attended and officiated, assisted by the first femme de chambre and two ordinary women. The dame d’atours put on the petticoat, and handed the gown to the Queen. The dame d’honneur poured out the water for her hands and put on her linen. When a princess of the royal family happened to be present while the Queen was dressing, the dame d’honneur yielded to her the latter act of office, but still did not yield it directly to the Princesses of the blood; in such a case the dame d’honneur was accustomed to present the linen to the Première femme de Chambre, who, in her turn, handed it to the Princess of the blood. Each of these ladies observed these rules scrupulously as affecting her rights. One winter’s day it happened that the Queen, who was entirely undressed, was just going to put on her shift; I held it ready unfolded for her; the dame d’honneur came in, slipped off her gloves, and took it. A scratching was heard at the door; it was opened, and in came the Duchesse d’Orléans: her gloves were taken off, and she came forward to take the garment; but as it would have been wrong in the dame d’honneur to hand it to her she gave it to me, and I handed it to the Princess. More scratching it was Madame la Comtesse de Provence; the Duchesse d’Orléans handed her the linen. All this while the Queen kept her arms crossed upon her bosom, and appeared to feel cold; Madame observed her uncomfortable situation, and, merely laying down her handkerchief without taking off her gloves, she put on the linen, and in doing so knocked the Queen’s cap off. The Queen laughed to conceal her impatience, but not until she had muttered several times, "How disagreeable! how tiresome!" All this etiquette, however inconvenient, was suitable to the royal dignity, which expects to find servants in all classes of persons, beginning even with the brothers and sisters of the monarch.
