= Pauline de Tourzel =

French noblewoman

- Comtesse de Bearn
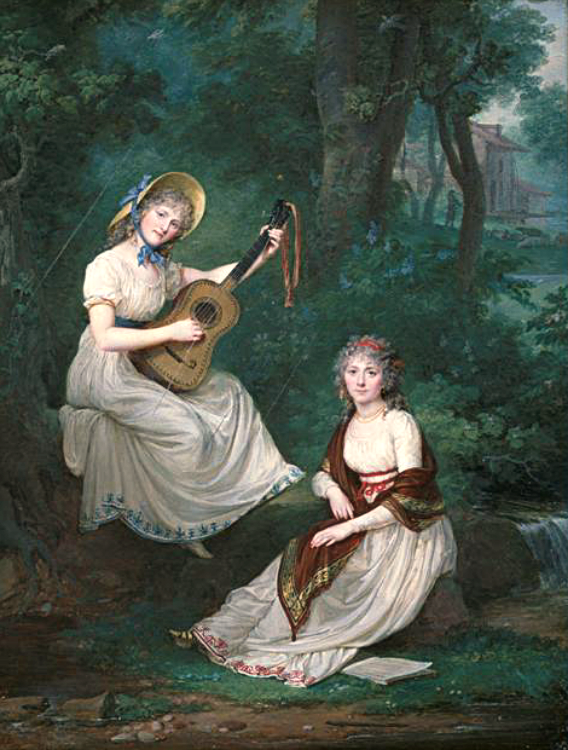
- Pauline with one of her older sisters
- Born: 15 October 1771; Paris, France
- Died: 9 July 1839 (aged 67); La Rochebeaucourt-et-Argentine, France
- Spouse: Alexandre Léon Luce de Galard de Brassac de Béarn (m. 1797)
- Issue: Alix de Galard de Brassac de Béarn (1799–1855); Louis-Hector de Galard de Brassac de Béarn (1802 – 1871)
- Father: Louis François du Bouchet de Sourches
- Mother: Louise-Élisabeth de Croÿ de Tourzel
- Occupation: Lady-in-waiting; Memoirist

Marie Charlotte Pauline de Tourzel (15 October 1771 – 9 July 1839) was a French noblewoman, courtier and memoirist. She was the daughter of Louise Élisabeth de Croÿ.

== Life ==
She was the daughter of the Marquise de Tourzel, Louise-Félicité-Joséphine de Croŷ d'Havré, the last governess of Louis XVI and Marie Antoinette's children. As was custom, she was called by her third given name Pauline by family members.

=== Revolution ===
Following her mother's appointment as governess to the children of France, Pauline lived intimately with the royal family at the Tuileries Palace. She is said to have giggled at the humour of the Comtesse de Provence, dined with the royal family, and was taught billiards by King Louis XVI himself despite not being formally presented at court, much to the horror of Mesdames Tantes, Madame Victoire and Madame Sophie.

Pauline was adored by the Dauphin Louis-Charles, who found in her a more playful alternative to his governess, her mother, the Marquise de Tourzel, whom he had nicknamed Madame Severe; the two were said to play endless games during the family's house arrest in the Tuileries. Pauline was crucial in persuading the young dauphin to be dressed in girl's clothing for the royal family's flight to Varennes, convincing the shy young boy that it was all part of a game of soldiers. During the royal family's refuge with the deputies of the National Assembly, he cried, constantly worrying about the fate of his beloved Pauline following the massacre at the Tuileries, only ceasing when they were reunited at the convent.

During her time in the Tuileries and later the Temple Prison, Pauline developed an intimate friendship with Marie Antoinette's eldest daughter Marie Thérèse, who was only a few years her junior.

=== 10 August ===
During the 10 August (French Revolution), the royal family, Louis XVI, Marie Antoinette, their two children, the king's sister, Madame Elizabeth, the Queen's close friend the Princesse de Lamballe, and Pauline's mother fled to safety, seeking refugee with the deputies of the National Assembly moments before the storming of the Tuileries by a Parisian mob. The Princess de Tarante offered to look after Pauline, who was to stay behind with the other women that still served, whilst her mother went with the royal family to Hôtel de Ville, seeking refuge with the National Assembly. Pauline herself suggested that the ladies-in-waiting, who gathered in one of the queen's chambers, should shut the windows and illuminate the room.

When the mob entered the chamber where the ladies-in-waiting were gathered, the Princesse de Tarente, according to Pauline, approached one of the revolutionaries and asked for his protection. He agreed, and escorted her and Pauline from the palace. Following this example, the rest of the ladies-in-waiting departed the palace in about the same way.

The princesse de Tarente and Pauline were escorted from the palace by the rebel, who left them on the street; they were then discovered by a mob who brought them to prison, but the prison director let them go free, and de Tarente brought de Tourzel with her to her grandmother, after which she could later be united with her mother.

Pauline rejoined her mother and the royal family at the convent where the assembly had detained them on the following day. Pauline accompanied the royal family when they were transferred into the Temple Prison where she slept in the kitchen with Madame Elizabeth.

=== Imprisonment ===
On the 19th of August, Pauline, along with her mother, The Marquise de Tourzel and the Princesse de Lamballe were removed to the La Force Prison for interrogation. Prior to the September massacres, an unidentified Englishman helped Pauline escape from the prison; she was soon joined by her mother, who also escaped the massacres, though their fellow prisoner Princesse de Lamballe was killed.

She and her mother were advised by their rescuer, a "Monsieur Hardi", to leave Paris because Pauline had escaped the prison illegally and was in danger of arrest, and they left for the countryside, where they lived incognito in Vincennes and at the property of her son in Aboundant outside of Dreux.

She continued to visit Marie Thérèse throughout her confinement in the Temple Prison, and continued to write to her during her exile after she left France in 1795, sending her a flower from the grave of her parents.

=== Later life ===
Pauline de Tourzel married Alexandre Léon Luce de Galard de Brassac de Béarn on 15 January 1797, and was thereafter known as Comtesse de Bearn. Because of their well known sympathies for the Bourbon family, they were not well regarded by Emperor Napoleon and their correspondence was reportedly surveilled by the secret police. They had four children

- Alix de Galard de Brassac de Béarn (31 December 1799 – 3 July 1855), who married Adrien Eugène Gaspard de Tulle de Villefranche and had six children.
- Louis Hector de Galard de Brassac de Béarn (12 April 1802 – 26 March 1871), who married twice and had nine children. His daughter Pauline was depicted in the famous portrait by Ingres.
- Pauline de Galard de Brassac de Béarn, who died young
- Hélène de Galard de Brassac de Béarn, who died young

Pauline and Marie Thérèse were reunited on 29 April 1814 at the Palace of Compiegne following the Bourbon Restoration. Pauline became a lady-in-waiting to Marie Thérèse and went with her to the graves of her parents, Louis XVI and Marie Antoinette. She accompanied Marie Thérèse on her trip around France, to provinces like Bordeaux but was eventually parted from her on 3 August 1830 following the abdication of Charles X. Her great-grandson Henri Amédéé de Broglie married the French heiress Marie Say. Marie's paternal grandfather, Louis Auguste Say, was the founder of the Say Sugar Company (now a subsidiary of Tereos).

== Liens ==
- Pauline de Tourzel, Souvenirs de quarante ans, 1789–1830
