= Première femme de Chambre =

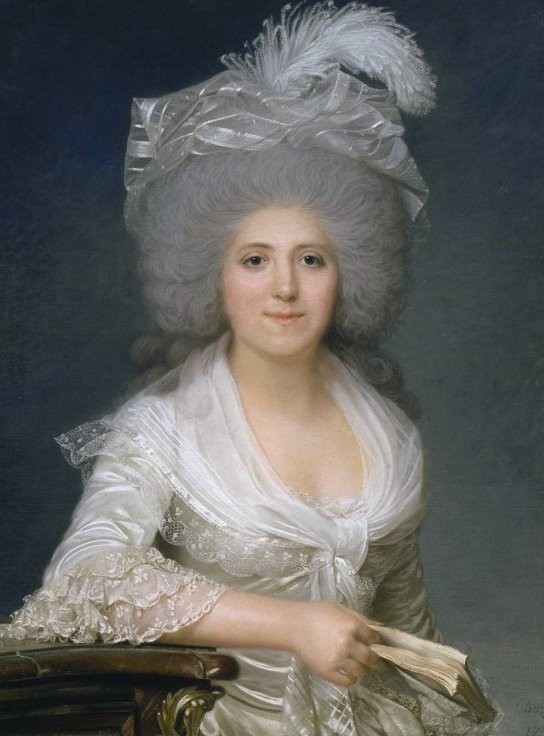
Jeanne Louise Henriette Campan, Première femme de Chambre to Marie Antoinette.

Première femme de Chambre ('First Chamber Maid') was an office at the royal court of France.

The Première femme de Chambre was in charge of the preparing of clothes, cosmetics and other things in the queen's wardrobe for the dressing and undressing ceremony, and supervised the femmes de chambre ('Chamber Maids'), who often reached a number of 16 per annum. The dressing and undressing of the queen was in turn supervised by the dame d'atour. A Première femme de Chambre was not formally ranked as a lady-in-waiting but rather belonged to the chamber staff and as such (as formally a servant and lady's maid rather than a lady-in-waiting) did not need to be a member of the nobility.

The Première femme de Chambre was the only one of the women of the queen's household except the dame d'honneur to be in possession of the keys to the queen's rooms and in permanent access to the queen. This gave her the opportunity to filter requests of meetings, audiences and messages to the queen and made her a de facto powerful person at court, where she was often flattered and bribed by the courtiers.

In 1775, the office of Première femme de Chambre was split in four, between Julie Louise Bibault de Misery and her three deputies Henriette Campan, Marie-Élisabeth Thibault and Louise Quetpée La Borde Regnier de Jarjayes, who took turns serving: they were all still in service when the queen's household was dissolved in 1792, at that time in supervision of six chamber maids (femme du chambre).

== Examples ==
=== Anne of Austria, 1615–1666 ===
- Antoinette de Jorron, Demoiselle du Boucquet, to Anne of Austria in 1616–1618
- Genevieve Robert, Dame du Bellier, to Anne of Austria in 1618–1636
- Marie Chesneau, Dame de Filandre, to Anne of Austria in 1636–1646
- Catherine Bellier, to Anne of Austria in 1646–1666

=== Maria Theresa of Spain, 1660–1683 ===
- Maria Molina, to Maria Theresa of Spain.

=== Maria Anna Victoria of Bavaria, 1680–1690 ===
- Barbara Bessola, to Maria Anna Victoria of Bavaria

=== Marie Leszczyńska, 1725–1768 ===
- Julie Louise Bibault de Misery

=== Marie Antoinette, 1770–1791 ===
- Julie Louise Bibault de Misery, to Marie Antoinette.
- Jeanne Louise Henriette Campan, to Marie Antoinette.
- Marie-Élisabeth Thibault, to Marie Antoinette.
- Louise Quetpée de Laborde, to Marie Antoinette.

== See also ==
- Woman of the Bedchamber, British equivalent
- Chamberer, a British role in the bedchamber
- Kammarfru, German and Nordic equivalents
