= Joseph-Laurent Malaine =

French painter (1745–1809)

Joseph-Laurent Malaine (21 February 1745 – 5 May 1809) was a French flower painter and created cartoons for tapestries as well as designs for wall-papers and textiles.

== Life ==
He was born in Tournai, Austrian Netherlands. His father was Régnier Joseph Malaine, a master flower painter in Tournai, where Joseph-Laurent Malaine also trained as a flower painter. (Note: According to the Prado website :) In 1773, he presented two paintings of flowers in vases at the first Lille "Salon des Arts". Paintings by him are dated from 1773, up to 1806.

It is not known when he arrived in Paris. He married Hélène Victoire Roze (d. 1856), the daughter of a master sculptor and wood merchant (Note: It is known that Cabinet maker Jan van Mekeren (1658–1687), for example, also ran a wood trade – presumably selling exotic woods to other artists like him:) in Paris in the summer of 1779. The couple lived on the rue du Faubourg Saint Martin.

In 1784 or 1786, he succeeded Maurice Jacques (1712–1784) and became a flower painter at the manufacture des Gobelins, "where he designed cartoons for chairs": he was thus a painter-cartoon designer and, with his workshop, created models for chair tapestries. Maurice Fenaille specifies that he "was invited by Director Pierre to come and occupy a lodging at the Manufacture; he was to receive no salary, but to be paid for all the works he would execute on behalf of the Manufacture." He adds that "Pierre, premier peintre du Roi, wrote on July 2, 1788 to Comte d'Angiviller to ask him to ratify Laurent Malaine's appointment."

The same author goes on to give details of an order received by Malaine: it concerns a "meuble complet" (i.e. all the seats in a salon) for which he made models for the backs, seats and platbands (the vertical strips of fabric or tapestry under the horizontal part of the seat) of two sofas, twelve armchairs and two sheets for fire screens.

A cartoon of this type can be seen at the Musée des Arts Décoratifs in Paris. Twenty-eight of Malaine's cartoons are preserved at the Mobilier National. Malaine also produced designs for borders, a "carpet design ... for the service of the Savonnerie manufactory" (1788), etc.

After Charles-Axel Guillaumot was appointed head of the Gobelins Manufactory, Jacqué indicated that the seminary where apprentices were trained, as well as the Royal Academy of Painting and Sculpture which trained them in drawing, were abolished, and the three painters attached to the manufacture dismissed, including Malaine, but the latter seems to have remained at the head of his workshop, at Les Gobelins.

By 1792, he was already working for the Arthur et Grenard (Rue Louis-le-Grand, at the junction with the boulevard des Italiens) wallpaper factory in Paris, and for an "indienne factory in Mulhouse, in Switzerland (Mulhouse was then an independent territory linked to Switzerland)", that of Dollfus père, fils & Cie, founded in 1786, "in whose affairs he was interested and which he was used to visiting", according to Fenaille. He also provides "a wallpaper project for the royal Savonnerie manufactory" (according to Véronique de Bruignac-La Hougue). He mentions his decision to leave the Gobelins in a letter dated September 29, 1792, three weeks after the September Massacres. According to Fenaille, "he was invited to evacuate the lodgings he occupied, the minister Roland having reiterated the order on October 11, 1792" because he worked less for the Manufacture than for the wallpaper and indienne factories.

In early 1793, having settled in Mulhouse, he continued his cooperation with the wallpaper manufacturer Nicolas Dollfus et Cie (they had started working together in 1790 - and he had previously been Nicolas Dollfus's teacher), designing wallpaper patterns for the Alsatian company, to which he remained loyal after his return to Paris", and worked as a flower painter for the canvas and wallpaper manufactures of Mulhouse, Thann, and Rixheim. (Note: La Grande encyclopédie, inventaire raisonné des sciences, des lettres et des arts (Volume 22) p. 1041. This source mentions a fabric factory, and does not mention the Rixheim factory) Returning to Paris in March 1797 (according to Jacqué; 1796, according to the Prado), "he continued to paint esteemed pictures, several of which have been attributed to Van Spaendonck" (Grand Dictionnaire), while continuing his collaboration with companies in Mulhouse, then Rixheim. He may then (according to the Prado) have been appointed professor at the Académie de Lyon, a position he held until his death in Paris on May 5, 1809 – however, Bernard Jacqué has found no trace of this appointment, and regards it only as a legend. He is buried in the Père-Lachaise cemetery, division 57.

== Paintings ==
Malaine exhibited at the Salon from 1791 to 1808. He painted in oil on copper, wood or canvas. Most of his works depict bouquets of flowers in vases set on entablatures, sometimes with insects or even birds. Among the paintings recently offered for sale were two still lifes, one depicting two stems of "roses of Sharon", the other two bunches of grapes in trompe-l'œil. Several paintings of fruit are known, such as one of peaches, with jasmine flowers and two goldfinches.

The Prado Museum's website describes him as "A modest painter whose works are few and far between, his compositions are characterized by an elegance and simplicity far removed from the spectacular style that prevailed at the time. His two paintings of vases in the Prado Museum are a good example of his meticulous, detailed style. His work is particularly interested in the realistic, tangible effect of different textures and motifs, whether flowers, vases or insects. Through the study of light on different qualities, he succeeds in creating a sense of volume that reinforces the realism of his paintings.".

At the time of his death, his son Louis Alphonse Joseph Malaine (Paris 1782 – Mulhouse 1858; his wife was from Thann) was a draftsman at the Gobelins. He "then made a career in Mulhouse where he became a specialist in paisley".

Malaine signed his paintings "Louis Malaine", "L Malaine", or with a monogram, "LJM" or "LM". In written sources, he is often referred to as "Malaine père", while "Malaine fils" is his son, Alphonse (Paris, June 16, 1782 - October 11, 1858, Mulhouse).

One of Malaine's pupils was Jacques Barraband, who became a painter in the "flower class" of the Lyon School of Drawing in 1807. (Note: "At the age of sixteen [that is in 1784 or 1785], he came to Paris, where he entered the studio of Malaine, painter-draughtsman at the Gobelins", Biographie universelle ancienne et moderne: histoire par ordre alphabétique de la vie publique et privée de tous les hommes. .... publ. under the dir. of Louis-Gabriel Michaud (1773-1858), vol. 3, p. 132)

=== Public collections ===
- Prado Museum: two paintings (oil on wood), painted between 1786 and 1793, are in the Prado Museum's reserves. They previously belonged to the Royal Collection (Royal Palace of Madrid, Queen's Chamber). (Note: Florero P002286 and Florero P002287, Prado Museum :)
- Mulhouse: A Bouquet de fleurs (oil on wood) was donated to the Musée des beaux-arts de Mulhouse in 1866 by Eugène Koechlin. (Note: Son of Jean Koechlin, maker of indiennes in Mulhouse; son of Daniel Koechlin, chemist, specialist in colouring materials and methods of printing and applying designs to various materials: see POP database : "Malaine"&resPage=6&last_view="list"&idQuery="56d0bc-6540-133d-b60b-261d0f75e")
- The "salle de séances" (town council meeting room) of Munster's town hall (on the second floor) is or was decorated with two paintings whose author could be Malaine. Entitled "Vase of flowers with white butterflies" and "Vase of flowers with colored butterflies", they are painted in oil on canvas, and represent bouquets of flowers in their vase, which is placed in an arched niche].
- In 1887, a painting from the Château de Vaugereau, (Note: This is where Baron Jean-Louis Henry de Longuève died. It was also the same château that (temporarily) housed the Grand quartier général from June 8, 1940) near Briare (Roses, peonies, delphiniums and other flowers, in baskets set on marble consoles: 600 fr.) and two paintings once belonging to Baron de Longuève ("Fleurs dans des corbeilles. Deux pendants sur cuivre: 600 fr.") were sold. Given that the Baron was the owner of Château de Vaugereau, it could be that these three paintings are actually only two, since the sale catalog of his collection only shows the two pendants. (Note: The Malaine paintings appear on pp. 9-10 of the catalog:)

Works by Malaine regularly come up for sale.

== Wallpaper ==
According to V. de Bruignac-La Hougue, wallpaper manufacturers called on designers from the Gobelins. Malaine began designing for wallpaper manufactures in the 1780s, for the Manufacture Arthur et Grenard (which became a royal manufacture in 1788), which was in operation from 1775 to 1789. (Note: "Association of the manufacturer Jean Arthur and the merchant René Grenard" (according to the POP database), both of whom were also members of the "section des Piques". See Bernard Jacqué, Un tournant du goût, le papier peint autour de 1797 [Petit journal d'exposition, Rixheim, Musée du papier peint, 12 July 1997-1 March 1997], Rixheim, MPP, 1997)

French painter Henri Lebert wrote that "Around the time of the French Revolution, we reached a new phase in the development of print design. A flower painter of great talent gave a more learned impulse to this varied art, through a more conscientious study of nature." That painter was Malaine, who used to sell his designs in Paris, and to send them over from Paris to Alsace. Lebert says that the designs he sold to Zuber in Rixheim "completely renewed the wall-paper industry. They are distinguished by the natural grace of each plant and a broad, well-felt touch, whose character draftsmen have rightly followed in the finest modern productions. These natural-sized groups of flowers, sometimes accompanied by fruit and birds, have always, since their appearance, served as a model for artists wishing to make good, complete studies." Lebert adds that when Malaine went back to Paris when it was safe again, the Gobelins tried to take him back, but Malaine "preferred to devote himself as a free-lance artist to painting pictures, while still working for the Zuber company and that of M. Steinbaechlein" : the manufactures sent him students. (Note: Henri Lebert, 'Notice sur les développements du dessin d'impression des toiles peintes en Alsace', in Revue d'Alsace, Fédération des sociétés d'histoire et d'archéologie d'Alsace (Colmar), 1865, p. 11-12: . There was no "Mr Steinbaechlein" as the name refers to that of the small river running through places like Dornach (now a part of Mulhouse. The Dollfus family had a textile factory there) or Morschwiller-le-Bas, with the Hofer (textile) Manufacture.)

Murs de papier details the subjects of wallpapers, and particularly the different kinds of flower illustrations and notes that : " We finally find the depiction of flowers striving for fidelity to nature, to a greater or lesser extent, which was Highly favored in the 1780s, and still very popular in the following decade. a whole range of artists, influenced by Dutch flower painters - some of whom settled in France, including G. van Spaendonck - created designs for various manufactures; these works aimed for a precise, naturalistic rendering, demonstrating a meticulous attention to the quasi-botanical veracity of flowers. A particularly brilliant player in this genre, Joseph-Laurent Malaine, worked for both Arthur et Grenard (later Arthur et Robert) and the Mulhouse factory. He unquestionably played a crucial role in the floral aspect of the most exquisite pieces, such as an overdoor adorned with flowers, fruit, and birds. The same author calls Malaine "an essential link in the creation of motifs for the Rixheim factory".

=== Public collections ===
The Pop base mentions four wallpapers designed from drawings by Malaine, two for the Manufacture Arthur et Grenard, and two for Hartmann Risler & Cie. (Note: Hartmann Risler & Cie (co-founded by N. Dolfuss and Hartmann Risler, 1758-1844) became manufacture Zuber & Cie in 1802. The latter is still in business, and shares its premises with the Wallpaper museum in Rixheim, where these works are now kept: see on "base POP")

Several models of wallpaper panels decorated with flowers painted by Malaine for Hartmann Risler et Cie (Rixheim) are held by the Bibliothèque nationale de France and can be viewed on Gallica.

The Musée des Arts Décoratifs in Paris owns several wallpaper panels decorated with bouquets of flowers; two panels with mythological scenes (Pygmalion and Galatea; Eurydice stung by the snake); a "cameo" (Note: In painting, the term "cameo" referred to a grisaille imitating a cameo, according to Littré. Here, colour is used.) representing a bouquet of flowers; a vase panel on a base crowned with a bouquet of fruit and foliage - the latter two works made for the Manufacture Zuber.

The Kassel wallpaper museum has an "Overdoor with a red macaw, green parrot and oak jay" designed by Malaine for Hartmann Risler & Cie.

The Bibliothèque Forney, in Paris, owns a piece of wall paper showing a Vase with naturalistic bouquet and fruit basket, also designed for the Manufacture Hartmann Risler, ca 1800. (Note: "Vase au bouquet naturaliste et corbeille de fruits, attique", Bibliothèque Forney, Réserve extérieure - papier-peint / Cote : PP 8416)

== Textiles ==
In 1746, a textile factory was founded by Jean-Henri Dollfus in the Republic of Mulhouse, which was not yet part of France. Until the Treaty of Reunion on January 28, 1798, Indiennes could be produced there without restrictions, but had to pay duties on entering France. The duties were abolished on February 17, allowing the indiennes trade to flourish. According to Henry d'Allemagne it was difficult to find good artists to draw textile models : "Designers and engravers are the most difficult to recruit for a factory, yet they are the ones on whom the company's success depends. Apart from the "artists" at Gobelins and Beauvais, and the draftsmen at Lyon's silk factories, there are very few specialists in textile decoration in France".

According to Antoinette-Joséphine-Françoise-Anne Drohojowska, the success of manufactures depended to a large extent on these artists' designs, and "the most sought-after genres were those whose subjects were natural flowers, which required the cooperation of distinguished artists, who were paid a lot of money." She then mentions Malaine among "the most distinguished artists of the period, whose canvases are very remarkable in terms of both drawing and colouring. One notices bouquets and garlands that imitate nature as well as the best paintings". Malaine worked for Dollfus, "one of the most important factories in Alsace for the perfection of its products and the beauty of its designs, due in part to Malaine père". In 1806, the company produced "34,000 pieces, with 7 to 800 workers".

The POP database lists Malaine as, among other things, "painter for the Mulhouse cloth printing industry". Malaine may have been featured in the exhibition 'Quand les fleurs font l'étoffe : une histoire de la flore dans l'imprimé', from October 26, 2018, to December 31, 2020, at the Musée de l'impression sur étoffes (Mulhouse).

One of Malaine's former pupils worked in fabric printing. He was Henri Hofer. (Note: Henri Hofer 1771-1837, great-grandson of Hans-Heinrich Dollfus (1667-1747) through the latter's daughter Ursule (1690-1747). (Henri also had a sister Ursule, 1756-1834; and a brother, Godefroy Hofer, 1761-1845, also an Indian manufacturer). Pierre Dollfus 1748 is Henri's great-great-uncle.) Here is a description of his work by Louis Spach: "Hofer's drawings ... resembled master paintings, translated onto canvas, with a spiritual touch". (Note: Louis Spach: . Spach also mentions that Malaine's son, "attached in 1810 to the Nicolas Kœchlin house, grasped the indienne drawing with intelligence and rendered all its effects")

The Revue d'Alsace also mentions Henri Hofer as being "attached to the establishment of M. P. Dolfus, (Note: Pierre Dollfus, 1748-1830, son of Johann Heinrich Dollfus 1724-1802) in Thann, distinguished himself above all by the application of the touch and style of the flower painter his master, in his drawings for painted canvas. They were daring successes in which he reached a rare level of perfection, such was his taste and facility in execution, and they enabled him to operate a kind of renovation of the art of drawing for printing, getting as close as possible, through the study of nature, to new results with the usual means of Persian illuminations in solid colours. His flower borders, painted with admirable suppleness and assurance, resemble paintings by the master, translated for cotton canvas. Among the variety of his work, which embraced all genres, he made, in concert with my father, (Note: (Bonaventure) Marie Lebert, son of Jean Pierre Lebert (born about 1730, Le Mans, died before 1794, drawing master in Paris), Marie was born in Paris on October 14, 1759, and he died in Colmar on November 22, 1836. He was an engraver and a drawer. He studied painting with Joseph-Marie Vien, engraving with Launay [[either Robert de Launay or his brother Robert de Launay]] and Née. Invited to design models for printed fabrics at the Thann indiennes factory (then a subsidiary of the Manufacture de Wesserling), he settled in Thann in 1784, returned to Paris from September 1788 to August 1790 to run a drawing and engraving workshop, then returned to Thann, where in 1791 he joined the Society of the Friends of the Constitution. Finally, in June 1796, he settled in Munster and from then on worked for the manufacture Soehnée l'aîné et Cie. He also left a number of drawings, including views of Thann. He retired to Colmar and was buried there. (Soehnée Sr is Jacques Frédéric Soehnée, painter Charles-Frédéric Soehnée's father).) in charge of figures, flower vases, fruit groups, for large drapery furniture. This worthy artist, retired from the business in which he had later participated as a manufacturer in Mulhouse, came to live in Colmar in 1837, where he died on October 11.". (Note: Henri Lebert, 'Notice sur les développements du dessin d'impression des toiles peintes en Alsace', in Revue d'Alsace, Fédération des sociétés d'histoire et d'archéologie d'Alsace (Colmar), 1865, p. 11-12: . Henri Lebert, who began his working life as a designer of floral motifs for the textile industry, like his father, left an autobiography, the interest of which was highlighted by Audrey Millet in Vie et destin d'un dessinateur textile. D'après le Journal d'Henri Lebert (1794-1862). Champ Vallon, 352 p. It is reviewed here (in French):)

Henri Clouzot also gives some details about Henri Hofer's brother Godefroy, also a student at "les Gobelins" : "At the Wesserling indiennes manufacture, brought the art of charming sofa designs, the secret of which he had learned at the Manufacture Royale des Gobelins and which are preserved in Mulhouse's historical museum." (Note: Henri Clouzot, 'La Tradition de la toile imprimée en Alsace', in La Renaissance de l'art français et des industries de luxe directed by Henry Lapauze, Paris, 1919, p. 286. Some photos are included. A lithography representing the Wesserling manufacture can be seen on this page : [])

== Bibliography ==
- Fenaille (Maurice), État général des tapisseries de la manufacture des Gobelins depuis son origine jusqu'à nos jours, 1907, IV, p. 410.
- Fenaille (Maurice), État général des tapisseries de la manufacture des Gobelins depuis son origine jusqu'à nos jours, 1912, V, p. 428.
- Vittet (Jean), Les Gobelins au siècle des Lumières. Un âge d'or de la manufacture royale (cat. exp.), 2014, p. 336.
- Gautier (Jean-Jacques), Sièges en société. Histoire du siège du Roi-Soleil à Marianne (cat. exp.), 2017, p. 56-57, fig. 3 p. 57.
- Michel Faré et Fabrice Faré, La vie silencieuse en France : la nature morte au XVIIIe siècle, Fribourg : Office du livre, 1976, pp. 254, 328, 356 et 392. Aussi : Paris : Société française du livre, 1976 (impr. en Suisse). - 435 p. : ill. en noir et en coul.; 33 cm.
- Jacqué (Bernard), De la manufacture au mur : pour une histoire matérielle du papier peint (1770-1914), sous la direction de Serge Chassagne, Lyon : Université Lumière Lyon 2, 2003
- Larousse (Pierre), Grand dictionnaire universel du XIXe siècle français, historique, géographique, mythologique, bibliographique.... , Tome 10 .
- Millet (Audrey), Vie et destin d'un dessinateur textile. D'après le Journal d'Henri Lebert (1794-1862). Champ Vallon, 352 p.
- Le Pouvoir des fleurs : Pierre-Joseph Redouté (1759-1840) (Catalog of the exhibition at the Musée de la Vie romantique, Paris, April 28 to October 1, 2017), Paris Musées, ISBN 978-2-7596-0345-9
- Christine Velut, Murs de papier : l'atelier du papier peint, 1798-1805, BnF Éditions, 2018 ISBN 978-2-7177-2776-0
