= Johann Birnbaum =

Johann Birnbaum, later Johannes von Birnbaum (born 6 January 1763, Queichheim, now Landau in der Pfalz - 20 May 1832, Zweibrücken) was a jurist in the Electorate of the Palatinate and a president of the "Court of Appeal" (Appellationsgericht) in Zweibrücken.

== Honours ==
- Ennoblement (Nobilitierung) (1817)
- In his home town of Queichheim, a street has been named "Birnbaum Straße" after him
- While the house in which he was born is no longer standing, a monument has been erected in front of the building which now occupies that address.

== Literary works ==
- Geschichte der Stadt Landau (1826) ["History of the City of Landau"]

== Bibliographies ==
- Hans Ziegler: Johannes Birnbaum (1763-1832). Ein Jakobiner aus Queichheim, Landau: Verlag Pfälzer Kunst, 1982 (ISBN 3922580122).
