= Jakob Ritter von Danner =

Bavarian general

- Jakob Ritter von Danner
- Born: Jakob Danner; August 7, 1865; Queichheim, Landau, Kingdom of Bavaria
- Died: 28 December 1942 (aged 77); Munich, Bavaria, Nazi Germany
- Military career
- Allegiance: Kingdom of Bavaria; German Empire; Weimar Republic
- Branch: (Kingdom of Bavaria) Royal Bavarian Army; Imperial German Army; Reichswehr
- Service years: 1886–1925
- Rank: Generalleutnant
- Commands: Bavarian 18th Reserve Infantry Regiment; 12th Bavarian Reserve Infantry Brigade; 21st Bavarian Infantry Brigade; Reichswehr Brigade Nr. 24; Stadtkommandantur München
- Conflicts: Boxer Rebellion; World War I Beer Hall Putsch
- Awards: Bavarian Military Order of Max Joseph; Bavarian Military Merit Order; Prussian Royal House Order of Hohenzollern

Jakob Ritter von Danner (7 August 1865 in Queichheim/Landau – 28 December 1942 in Munich) was a general in the Royal Bavarian Army, the Imperial German Army and the Reichswehr. As commandant of the Munich garrison of the Reichswehr, he was a central figure in putting down the attempted Beer Hall Putsch by Adolf Hitler and the Nazis in 1923.

== Early life and family ==
Jakob Danner was born on 7 August 1865 in Queichheim in the Bavarian Palatinate as the son of Ludwig Danner and Karolina, née Reich. On 1 December 1913, he married Anna, née Fuchssteiner.

== Military Service ==
Danner entered the Royal Bavarian Army on 13 August 1884 as an officer candidate in the Royal Bavarian 17th Infantry Regiment "Orff" (Königlich Bayerisches 17. Infanterie-Regiment „Orff“) in Germersheim and was commissioned a lieutenant on 7 July 1886. He was promoted to Oberleutnant (first lieutenant) on 22 December 1893, initially without a patent but later receiving a patent of 6 November 1894.

In July 1900, Danner was transferred to the 6th East Asian Infantry Regiment (6. Ostasiatisches Infanterie-Regiment) and served in the German expeditionary forces sent to China during the Boxer Rebellion, where he earned the Bavarian Military Merit Order 4th Class with Swords, the Prussian Crown Order 4th Class with Swords and the Austrian Military Merit Cross 3rd Class with War Decoration. He returned to Bavarian military service in 1901. On 28 October 1901, he was promoted Hauptmann (captain) and transferred to the Royal Bavarian 20th Infantry Regiment "Prinz Franz" (Königlich Bayerisches 20. Infanterie-Regiment „Prinz Franz“). On 20 October 1907, he was named a Kompaniechef (company commander) in the Royal Bavarian 13th Infantry Regiment "Franz Joseph I., Kaiser von Österreich und Apostolischer König von Ungarn" (Königlich Bayerisches 13. Infanterie-Regiment „Franz Joseph I., Kaiser von Österreich und Apostolischer König von Ungarn“).

Danner was transferred to the staff of the 13th Infantry Regiment on 13 February 1910 and promoted to major on 7 March 1910. On 7 March 1912, he was named a battalion commander in the Royal Bavarian 18th Infantry Regiment "Prinz Ludwig Ferdinand" (Königlich Bayerisches 18. Infanterie-Regiment „Prinz Ludwig Ferdinand“). A transfer to the Royal Bavarian 7th Infantry Regiment "Prinz Leopold" (Königlich Bayerisches 7. Infanterie-Regiment „Prinz Leopold“) followed on 19 March 1914, where he was named commander of the regiment's 2nd Battalion.

With the start of World War I, Danner was sent into the field as commander of the 2nd Battalion of the 7th Bavarian Infantry Regiment, being promoted to Oberstleutnant (lieutenant colonel) on 10 September 1914. He was wounded on 20 August 1914 in the Battle of Lorraine and again on 7 November 1914 in the fighting between the Meuse and the Moselle rivers. After returning from the hospital on 7 December 1914, he briefly commanded the Bavarian 5th Infantry Regiment.

On 29 December 1914, he took command of the newly-formed Royal Bavarian 18th Reserve Infantry Regiment (Königlich Bayerisches Reserve-Infanterie-Regiment Nr. 18). He commanded this regiment on the Western and Eastern Fronts, except for brief respites, until July 1918. He received his third wound on 5 August 1916 and was hospitalized on several occasions for blood and eye ailments, including hospitalization in Munich for eye surgery from 12 November 1917 to 19 February 1918.

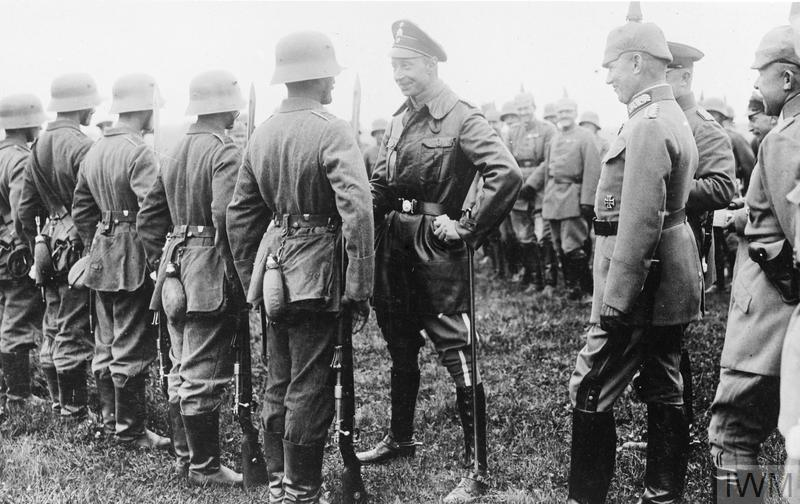
Crown Prince Wilhelm inspecting German troops at Charleville, 20 July 1917. On his left is Danner.

For valor on 1 December 1916 in the fighting in the Upper Alsace region, Danner was decorated with the Knight's Cross of the Military Order of Max Joseph, Bavaria's highest military honor, on 1 September 1917. For a Bavarian commoner, award of this order of knighthood conferred nobility. Danner received his patent of nobility from the King of Bavaria on 20 September 1917, taking the title "Ritter von" (Note: "Ritter" (knight) is a German title of nobility roughly translating as "Sir". For knights of the Bavarian Order of Merit of the Bavarian Crown and the Military Order of Max Joseph who were not already members of the nobility, the title was a personal, non-hereditary, one.). Ritter von Danner had, in the meantime, been promoted to Oberst (colonel) on 17 April 1917. He also held several temporary brigade commands, including of the Bavarian 15th Reserve Infantry Brigade (parent formation of his regiment) and the Prussian 5th Ersatz Infantry Brigade.

From 6 July to 15 September 1918, Oberst Ritter von Danner commanded the Bavarian 12th Reserve Infantry Brigade. He was named commander of the Bavarian 21st Infantry Brigade on 30 September 1918, and led that brigade through the end of the war and into 1919. During the post-war unrest, he led the "Gruppe Danner" of the III Bavarian Army Corps. From 14 May 1919 until 30 September 1920, he commanded Reichswehr Brigade Nr. 24 in Nuremberg.

On 1 October 1920, Colonel Ritter von Danner took command of the Munich city garrison (Stadtkommandantur München) and was promoted to Generalmajor on 1 July 1921. He led this command, which also entailed serving as deputy commander of Military District VII (Wehrkreis VII), until his retirement. It was during this period that the Nazi Party, under the leadership of Adolf Hitler and its allies, attempted a coup d'état to overthrow the Bavarian government. General Ritter von Danner reacted quickly, placing troops on alert and acting to ensure that the commander of Wehrkreis VII, which controlled all troops in Bavaria, did not support the putsch attempt or vacillate in the face of it. Three days after the failure of the Beer Hall Putsch, Hitler was arrested and charged with treason. Ritter von Danner was promoted to Generalleutnant on 1 January 1925 and retired on 31 July 1925.

== Later years ==
After retirement, Generalleutnant Ritter von Danner served as the first president of the Bavarian Warrior League (Bayerischer Kriegerbund) and later as the second president of the Reich Warrior League "Kyffhäuser" (Reichskriegerbund „Kyffhäuser“). He died on 28 December 1942 in Munich.

== Decorations and awards ==
- Kingdom of Bavaria:
  - Military Order of Max Joseph, Knight's Cross (1 September 1917)
  - Military Merit Order, Officer's Cross with Swords (26 September 1917)
  - Military Merit Order, 3rd Class with Crown and Swords (5 February 1917) (Note: Bavarian regulations allowed for continued wear of the 3rd Class upon award of the Officer's Cross.)
  - Military Merit Order, 3rd Class with Swords (22 December 1914) (Note: Returned on receipt of a higher class of the order.)
  - Military Merit Order, 4th Class with Crown (30 December 1913) (Note: Bavarian regulations allowed for wear of both a peacetime class and a wartime class of the Military Merit Order.)
  - Military Merit Order 4th Class with Swords (1901) (Note: Bavarian regulations allowed for wear of more than one class of the Military Merit Order with Swords when they were awarded for different conflicts. In this case, Danner continued to be entitled to his award from the Boxer Rebellion after receiving higher classes of the order during World War I.)
  - Officer's Service Decoration Cross, 1st Class (23 May 1918)
  - Jubilee Medal of the Bavarian Army (12 March 1905)
- Kingdom of Prussia:
  - Order of the Red Eagle, 4th Class (8 September 1909)
  - Order of the Crown, 4th Class with Swords
  - Royal House Order of Hohenzollern, Knight's Cross with Swords (9 May 1917)
  - Iron Cross, 1st (26 April 1915) and 2nd Class (30 September 1914)
- German Empire:
  - China Commemorative Medal (1901)
  - Wound Badge (1918) in Silver (mattweiß)
- Austria-Hungary:
  - Order of the Iron Crown, 3rd Class with War Decoration (19 July 1917)
  - Military Merit Cross, 3rd Class with War Decoration
  - Inhaber Jubilee Medal (2 December 1908) (Note: This was a version of the 1908 jubilee decorations for members of the foreign regiments for which Emperor Franz Joseph was Inhaber.)

== Bibliography ==
- Bayerisches Kriegsministerium (Herausg.): Militär-Handbuch des Königreichs Bayern 1914 (Bavarian War Ministry (eds.): Military Handbook of the Kingdom of Bavaria 1914), Drucksachen-Verlag des Kriegsministeriums, Munich 1914
- Deutscher Offizier-Bund (Herausg.): Ehren-Rangliste des ehemaligen Deutschen Heeres auf Grund der Ranglisten von 1914 mit den inzwischen eingetretenen Veränderungen, 1926 (League of German Officers (eds.): Honor Rank List of the former German Army on the Basis of the Rank Lists of 1914 with Intervening Changes, 1926)
- Reichswehrministerium (Herausg.): Ranglisten des Deutschen Reichsheeres 1924, 1925, 1926 (Reichswehr Ministry (eds.): Rank Lists of the German Army, 1924, 1925 and 1926 editions)
- Konrad Krafft von Dellmensingen: Das Bayernbuch vom Weltkriege 1914-1918, Stuttgart 1930 (Konrad Krafft von Dellmensingen: The Bavaria Book of the World War 1914-1918, Stuttgart, 1930)
- Bayerisches Kriegsarchiv: Die Bayern im großen Krieg, 2.Auflage 1923 (Bavarian War Archives: Bavaria in the Great War, 2nd edition, 1923)
- Bayerisches Kriegsarchiv: "Bayerns Goldenes Ehrenbuch", gewidmet den Inhabern der höchsten bayerischen Kriegs-auszeichnungen aus dem Weltkrieg 1914/18, München 1928 (Bavarian War Archives: "Bavaria's Golden Book of Honor", dedicated to the holders of the highest Bavarian war decorations of the World War 1914-18, Munich, 1928)
- Rudolf von Kramer, Otto Freiherr von Waldenfels und Dr. Günther Freiherr von Pechmann: Virtuti Pro Patria: Der königlich bayerische Militär-Max-Joseph-Orden, München 1966 (Rudolf von Kramer, Otto Freiherr von Waldenfels & Dr. Günther Freiherr von Pechmann: Virtuti Pro Patria: The Royal Bavarian Military Max Joseph Order, Munich, 1966)
