= Château de Montal =

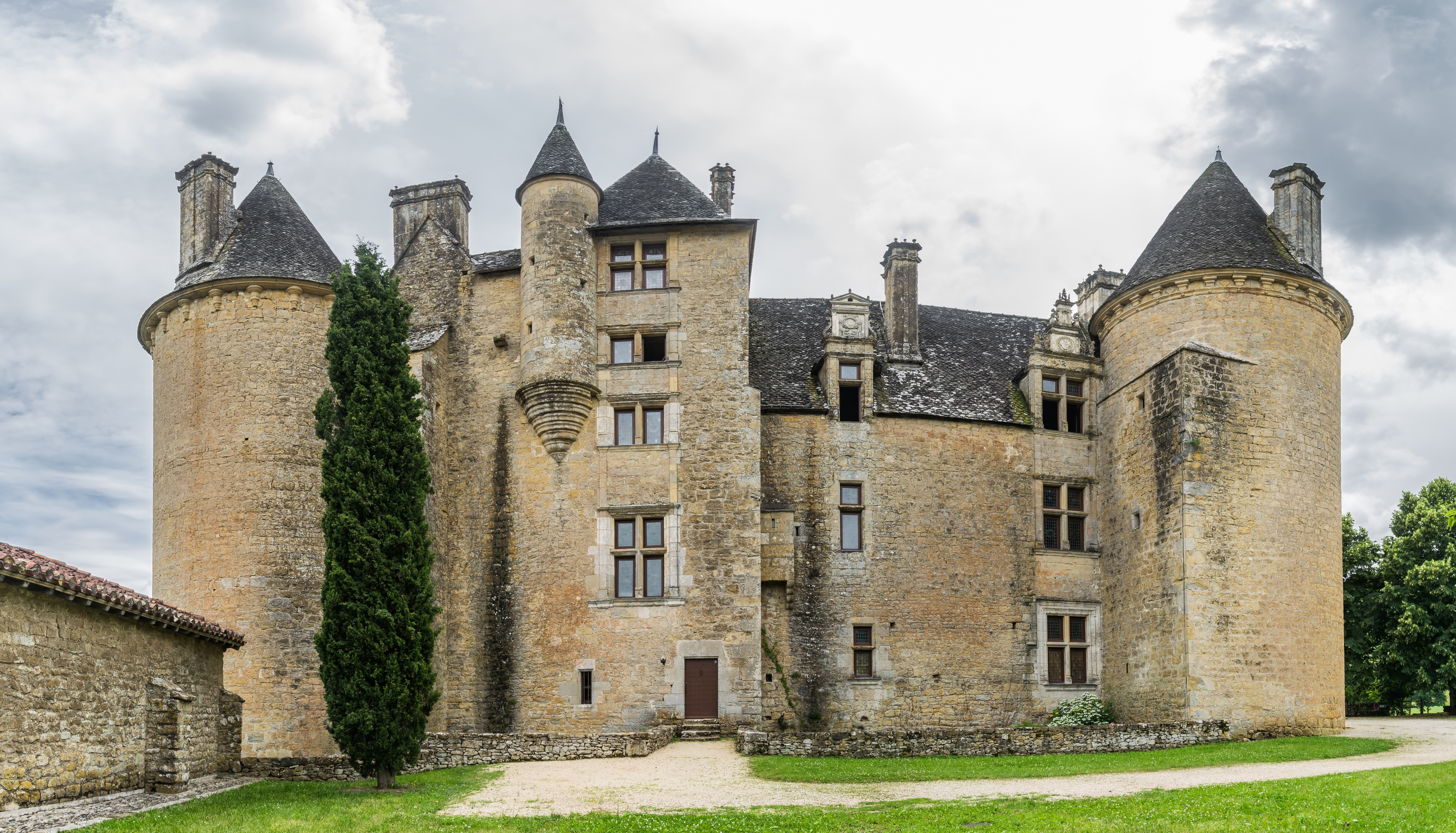
- Château de Montal, June 2018

- Location within France
- 44°30′54″N 1°30′51″E
- Location: Saint-Jean-Lespinasse, France

Site notes
- Architectural style: French Renaissance

Monument historique
- Designated: 14 June 1909

The Château de Montal (Note: The Château de Montal is sometimes referred to as the Château de Saint-Jean-de-Lespinasse.) is a French Renaissance château located in the heart of the valley of the Bave in the commune of Saint-Jean-Lespinasse in Lot department in the region of Occitanie, in southwestern France. The château has been classified as a historical monuments since 14 June 1909.

== History ==
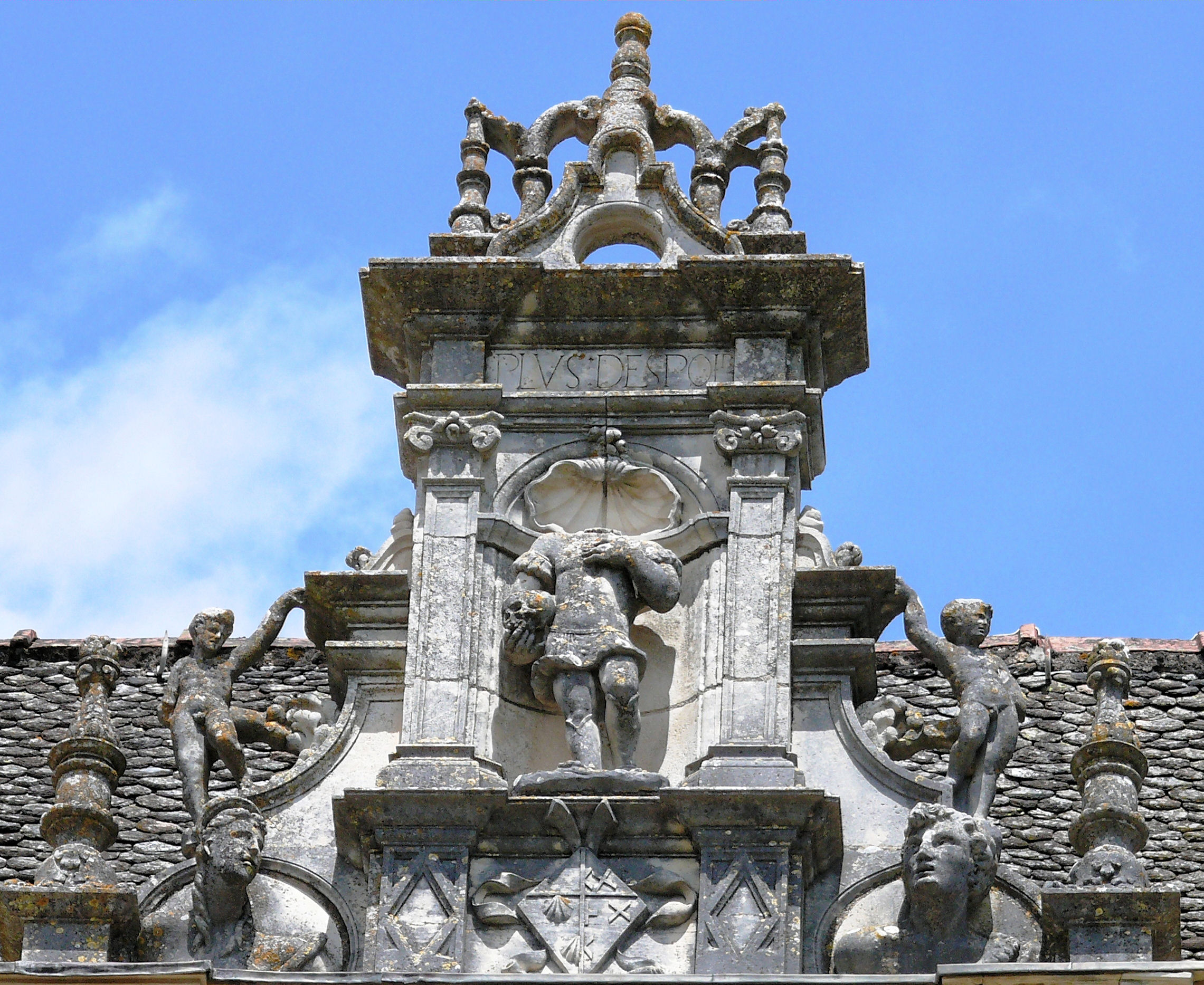
Courtyard skylight

In 1494, a château known as "Saint-Pierre" was acquired by Robert de Balzac, upon his marriage to Antoinette de Castelnau-Caylus. Robert de Balsac was Seigneur (Lord) of Entraygues, Chamberlain to Louis XI and Seneschal of Agenais. In 1495, he accompanied King Charles VIII to Italy, where the King appointed Balzac Governor of Pisa.

In 1496, Balzac's daughter, Jeanne de Balsac d'Entraygues, married Amaury II de Montal, Lord of Laroquebrou and owner of the Château de Laroquebrou. After Montal's death in 1510, Jeanne transformed the medieval residence into the French Renaissance style between 1519 and 1534. She also lost her eldest son Robert in 1523 during the wars in Italy. During the renovations, she included sculpted busts on the façade of Amaury, their two sons Dordet and Robert, their daughter Nine and her husband François de Scorailles, and Jeanne herself. In 1591, the château passed into the Pérusse des Cars family through the 1595 marriage of Rose de Montal to François de Pérusse des Cars, 1st Marquis de Montal, Marquis de Merville. (Note: Rose de Montal, Marquise de Montal and Marquise de Merville, was the daughter and sole heiress of Catherine d'Ornezan-Auradé and Gilles de Montal, Lord of Laroquebrou, Carbonnières, de Saint-Victor, d'Ytrac, de Saint-Jean-Lespinasse.)

In 1771, Count Jean-Jacques de Plas de Tanes acquired the château and the Seigneury of Montal. His son Antoine married a daughter of the Germanic nobility. He was a Deputy for the nobility in the Estates General in 1789, but had to give up his domain once the French Revolution began. He fled in 1792, the château was ransacked, unsuccessfully offered for sale in January 1793, and then turned into an inn. Upon his return, the château was returned to Antoine, but it was without furnishings and uninhabitable. Instead of returning to the château, he turned it over to his cousin from Plas de Curemonte, whose daughter married Boni de Lavergne.

=== 19th century ===
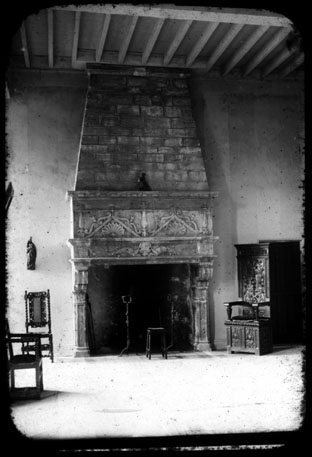
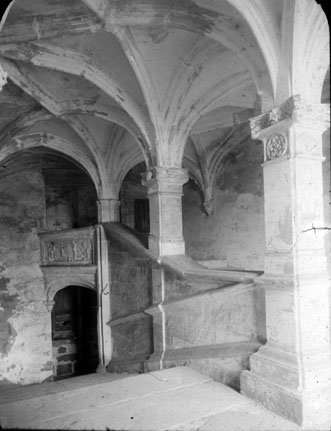
Interior fireplace (left), staircase (right)

The son of Lavergne sold the château to a banker from Saint-Céré. After his widow's death, the château was again sold to the property merchant Macaire du Verdier in 1858. In 1880, the château was dismantled and sold the sculpted decorations, doors, skylights and fireplaces, nearly everything except the staircase which was to be sold at a later date. The sale of the features brought in 142,000 francs. The removal of the stereotomic main staircase, which would have meant the destruction of the building, did not take place. A second sale of interior decorations took place on 11 December 1903, but was less profitable for the sellers, therefore, the château was sold in 1908 to the industrialist Maurice Fenaille.

=== 20th century ===
Between 1908 and 1913, Maurice Fenaille undertook the restoration of the château, using his fortune to find, buy or make copies made of items that were scattered around the world. He furnished it with period furniture. On 13 September 1913, before President Raymond Poincaré and Anatole de Monzie, he donated the restored château to the French State with life tenancy for himself and his three daughters. Through the donation, the state was able to reinstall three busts which had been bought by the Louvre during 1881 and 1903 sales as well as a skylight donated from the Kensington Museum, the bust of Robert de Balzac from the Lyon Museum, and the bust of Jeanne de Balzac from the Berlin Museum.

On 22 May 1940, Princess Joséphine Charlotte, Prince Baudouin, and Prince Albert, the three children of King Leopold III of the Belgians, were sent into exile in the Château de Montal. Prince Baudouin fell ill there. After the Belgian surrender to the Nazis, the royal children left the château in France for San Sebastián in Spain on June 21, 1940.

In March 1943, the Mona Lisa was hidden at the Château de Montal until its relocation to the Louvre in June 1945.

=== 21st century ===
Since 1 October 2006, the Château de Montal has been under the responsibility of the Centre des monuments nationaux and open to visitors.

== Gallery (June 2018) ==
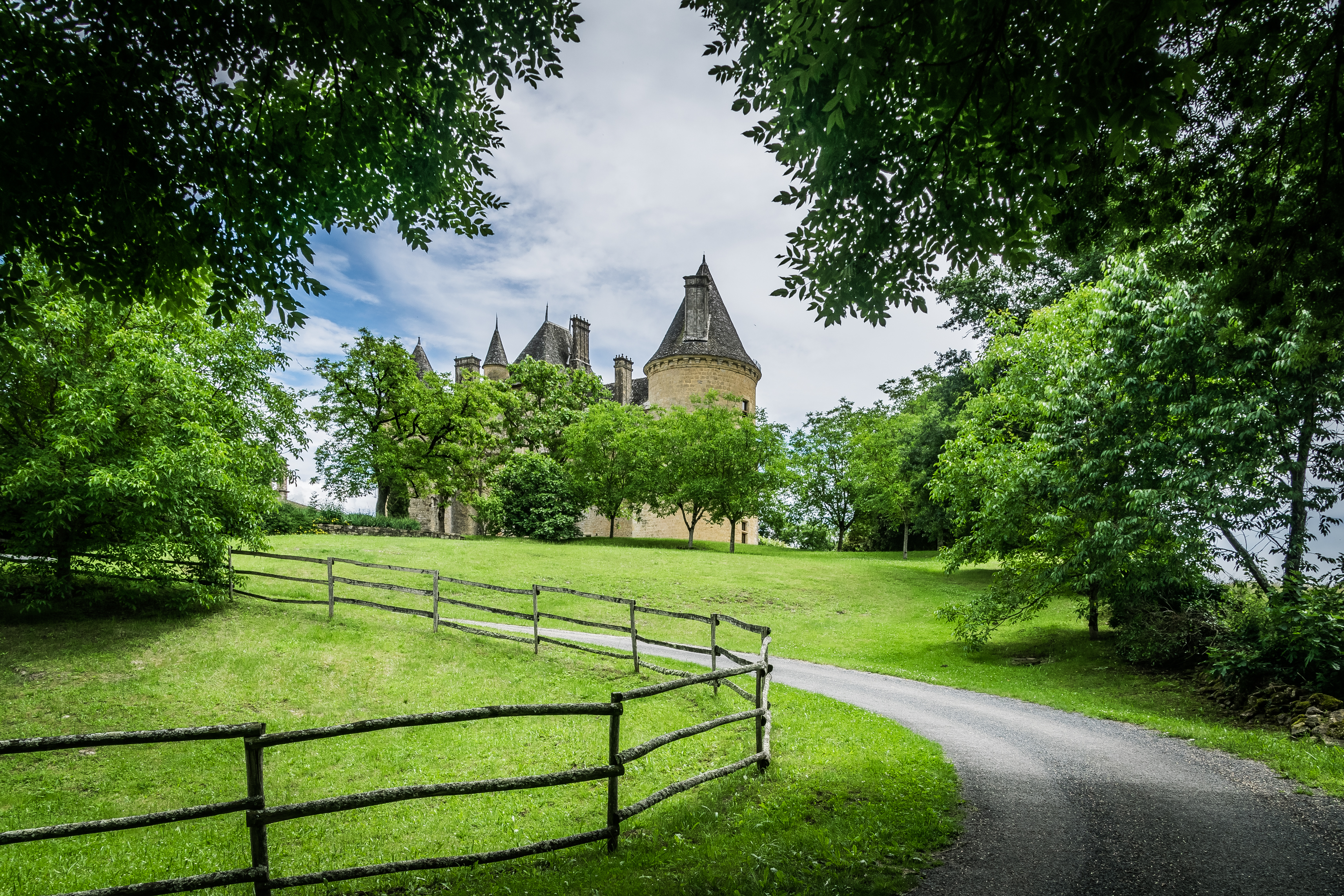

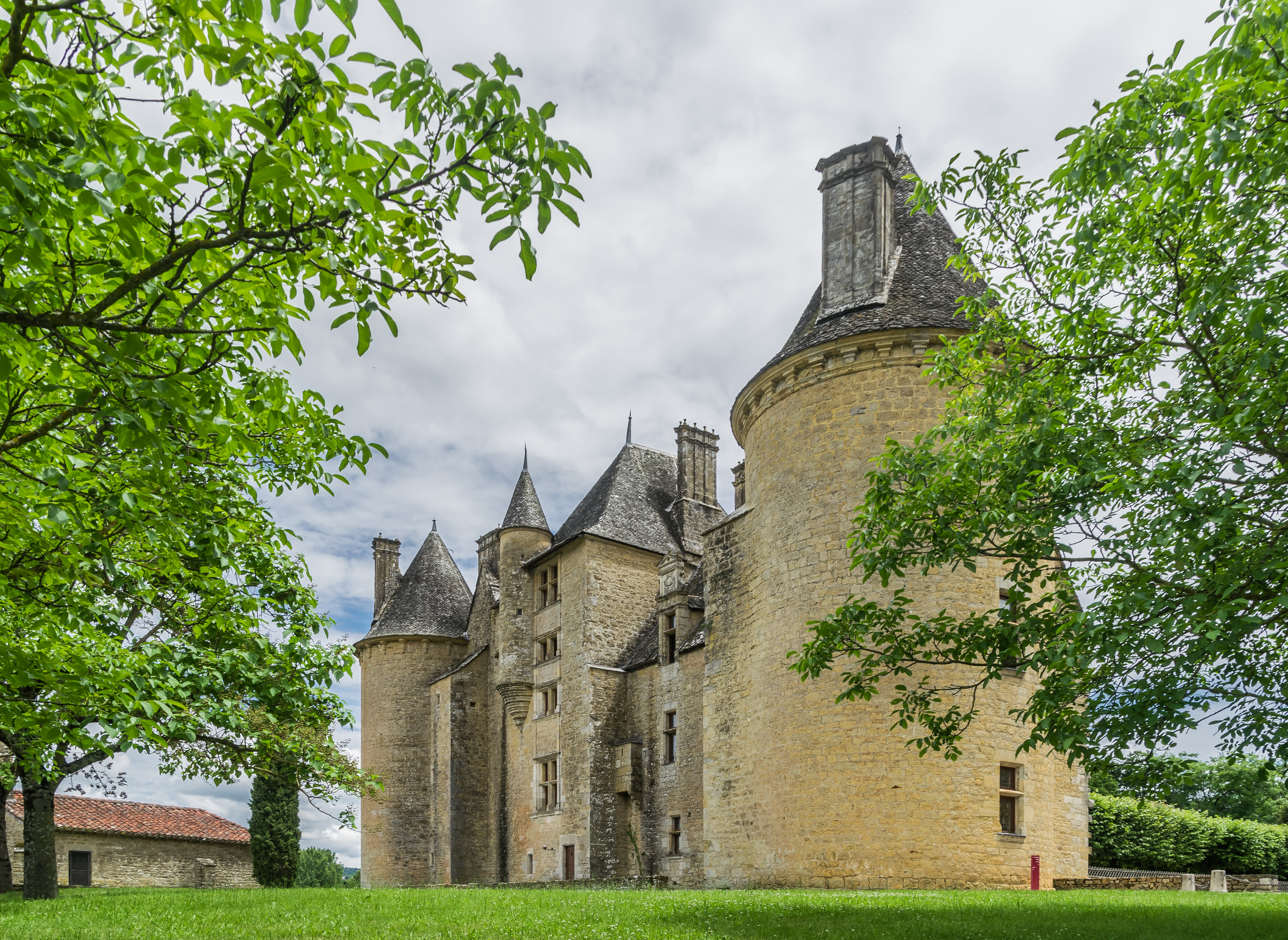

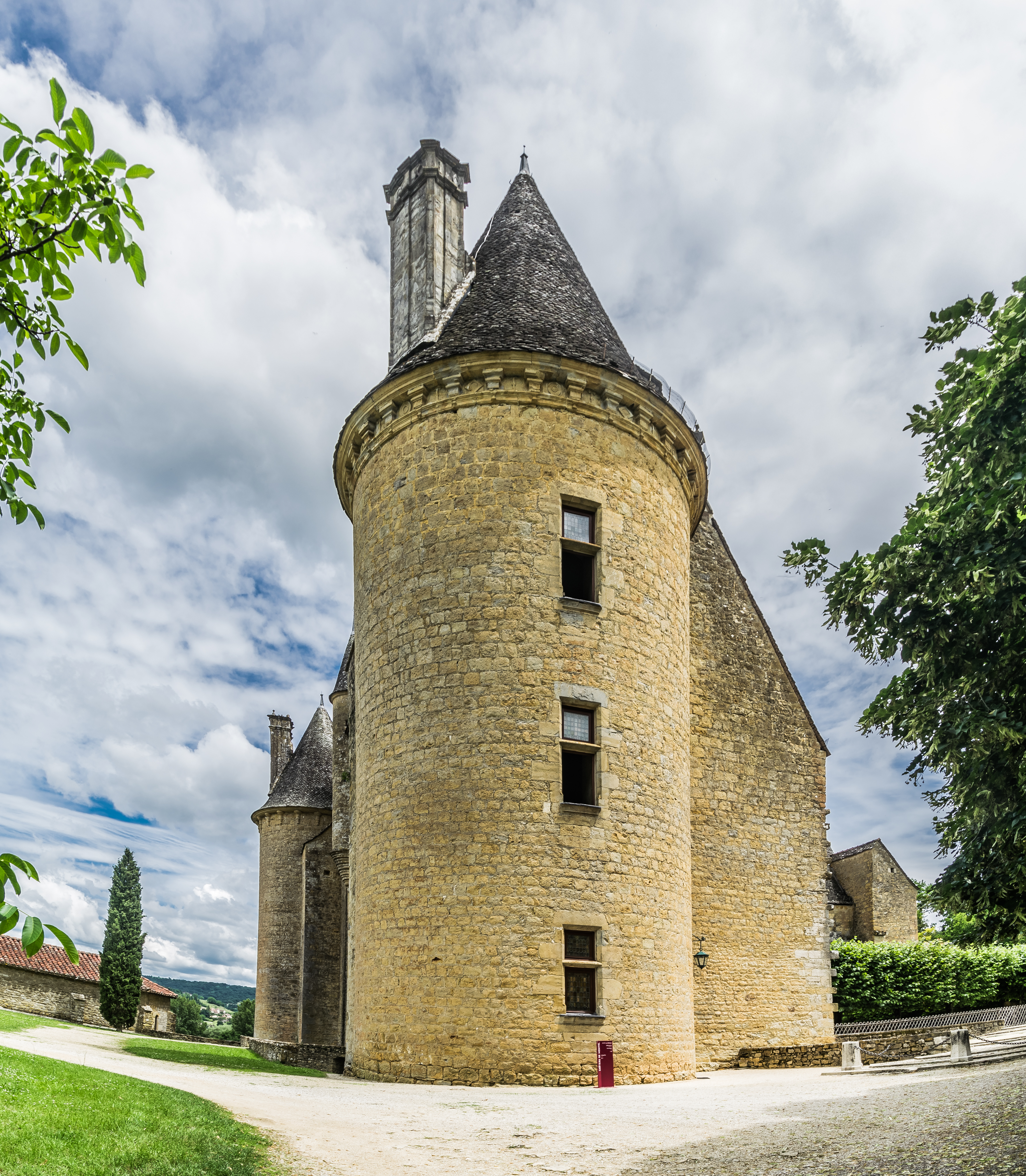

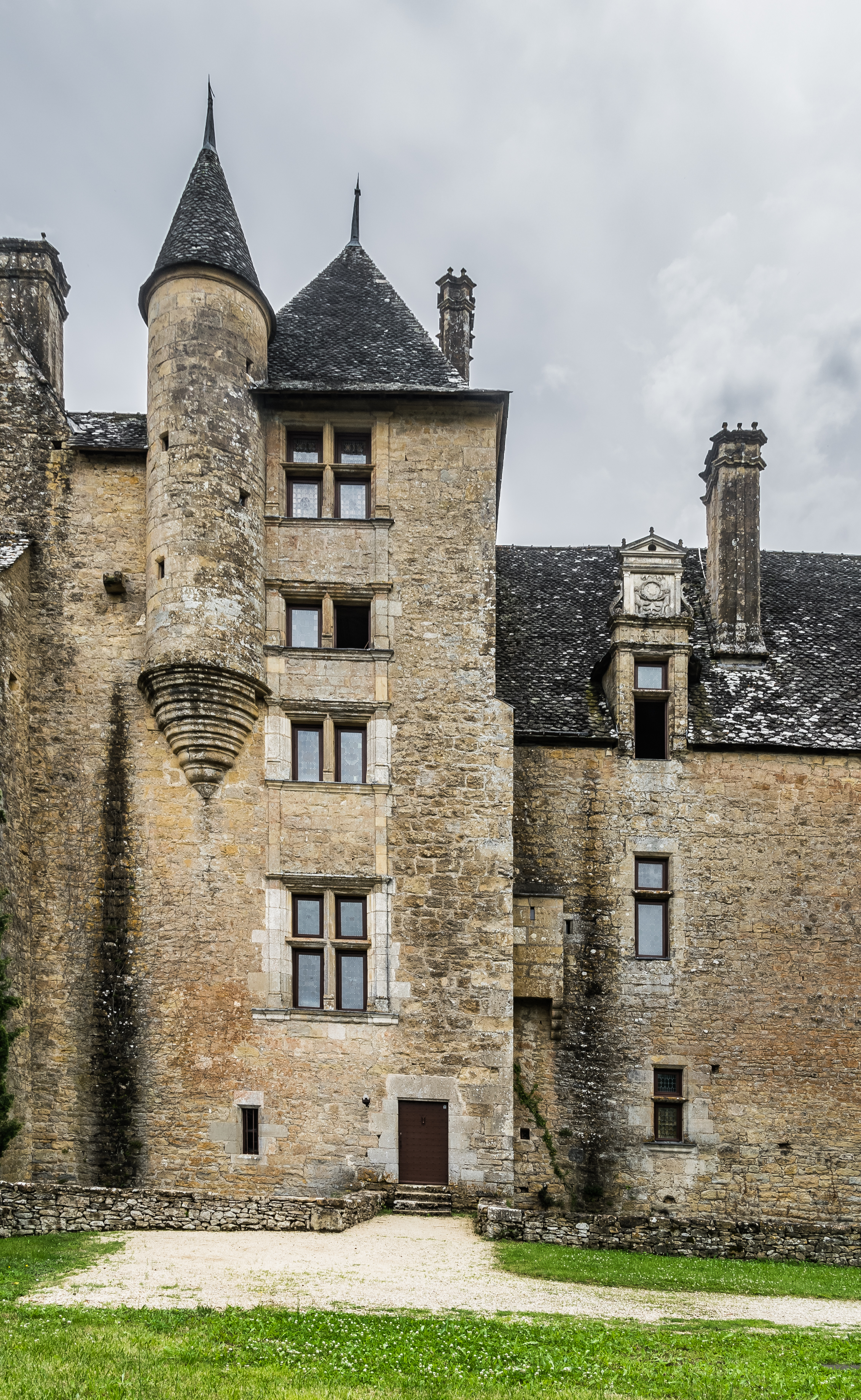

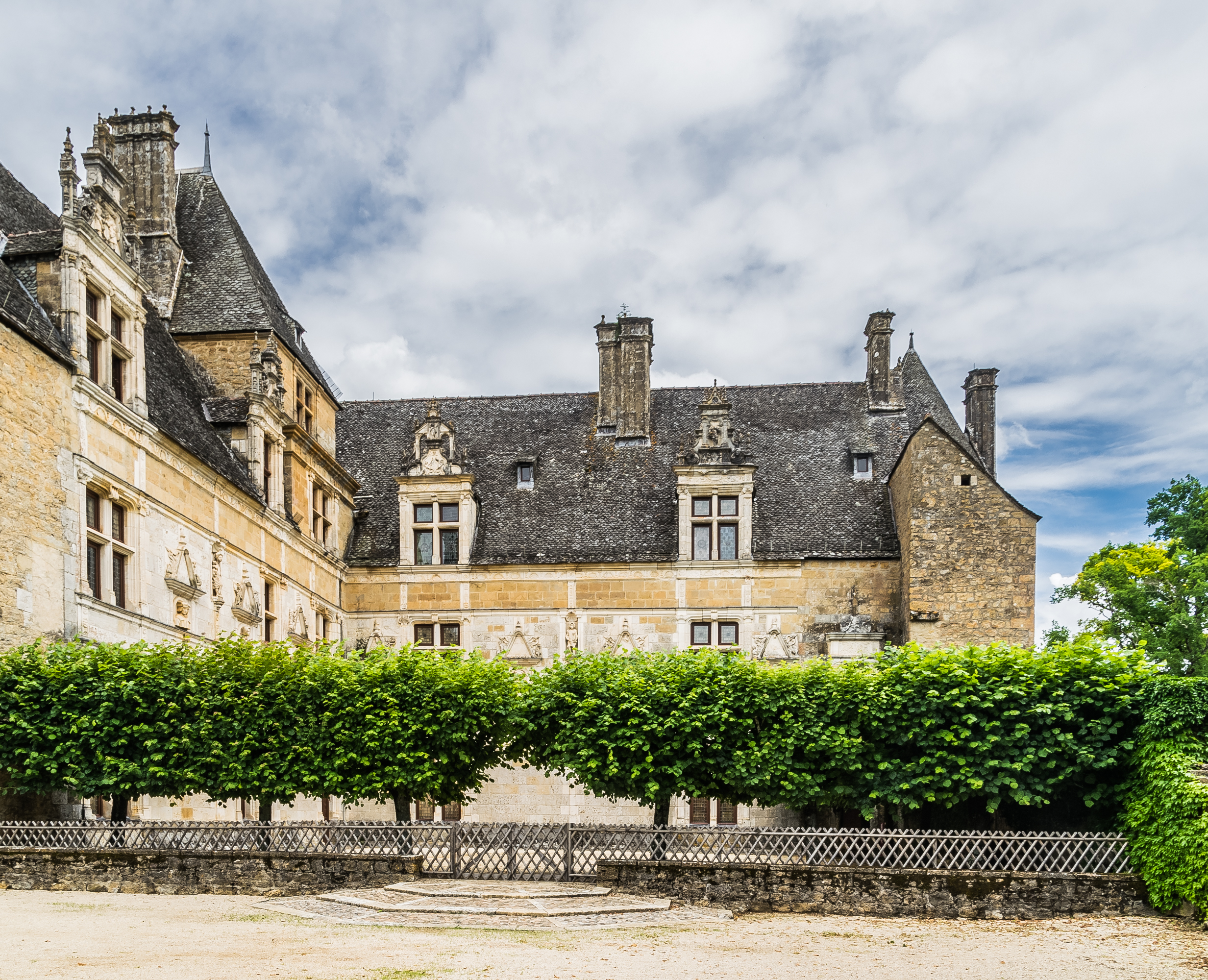

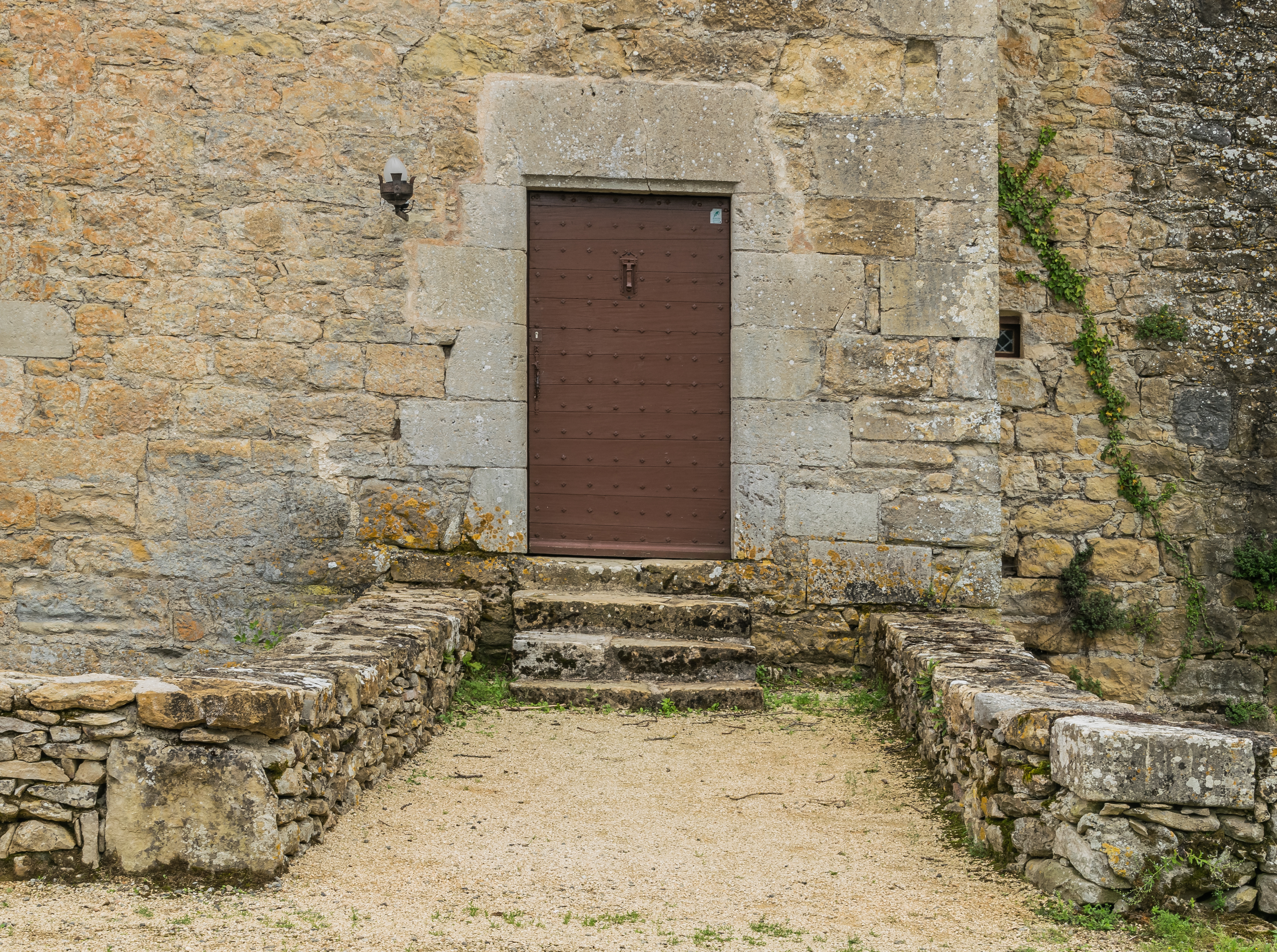

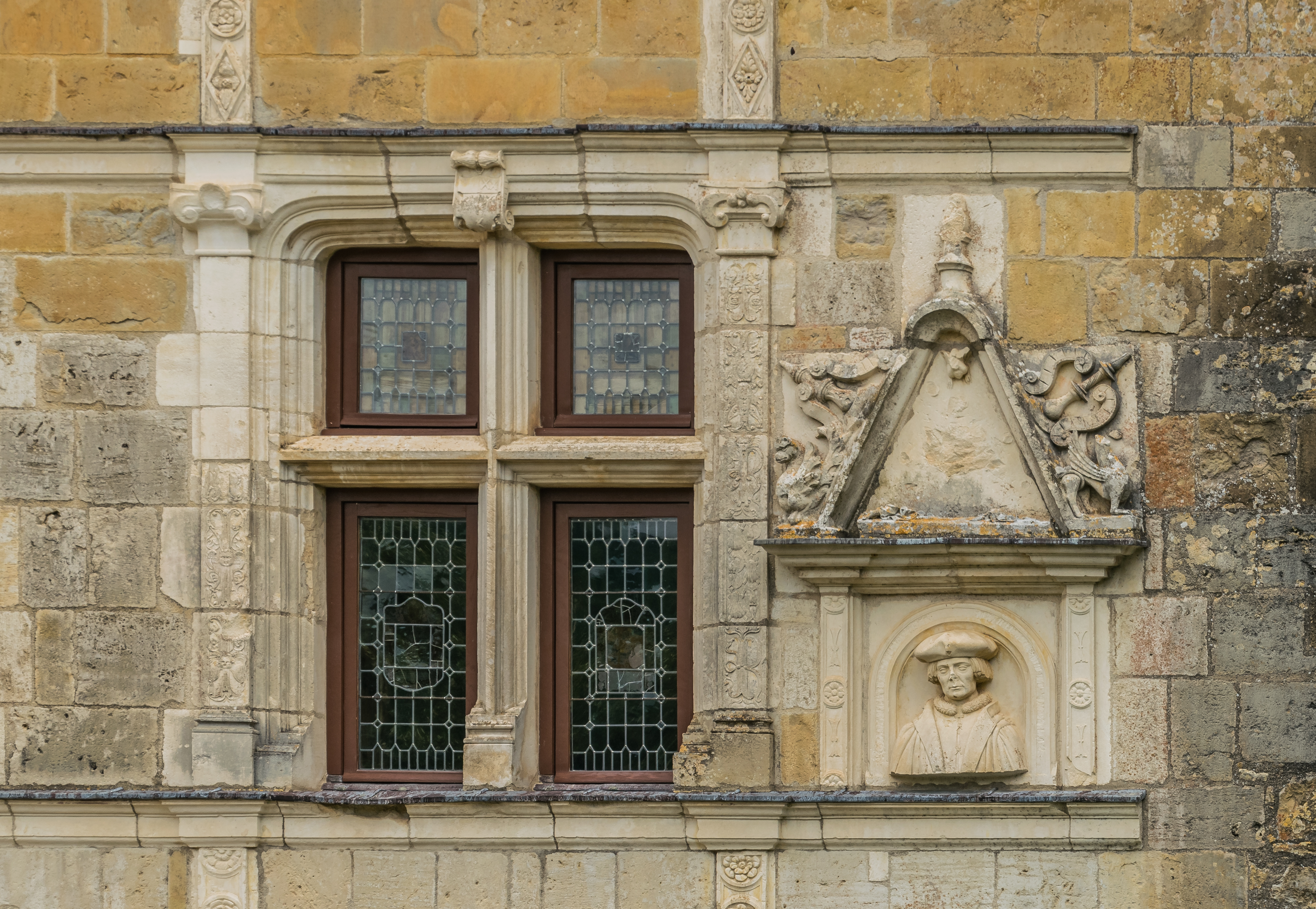

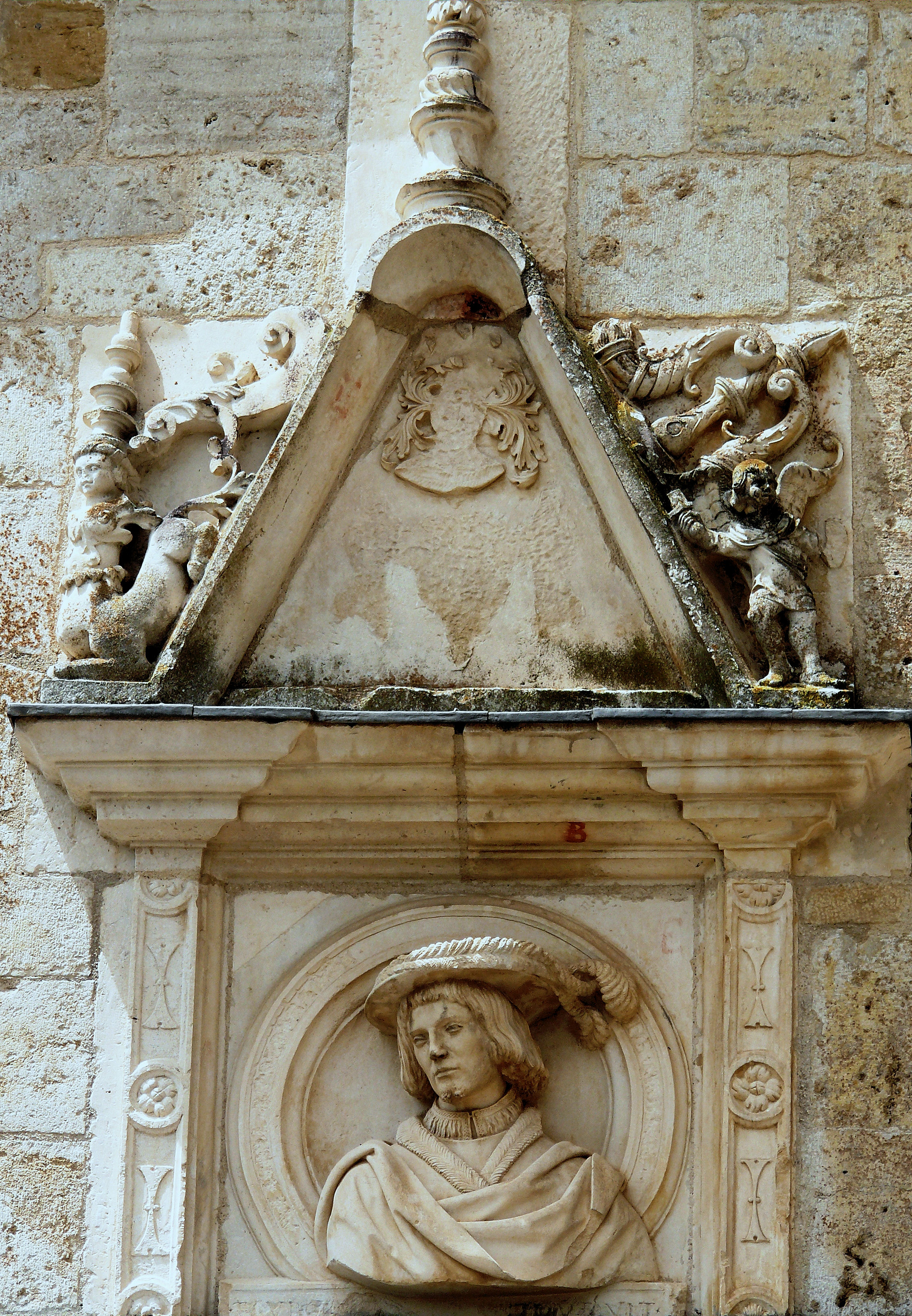

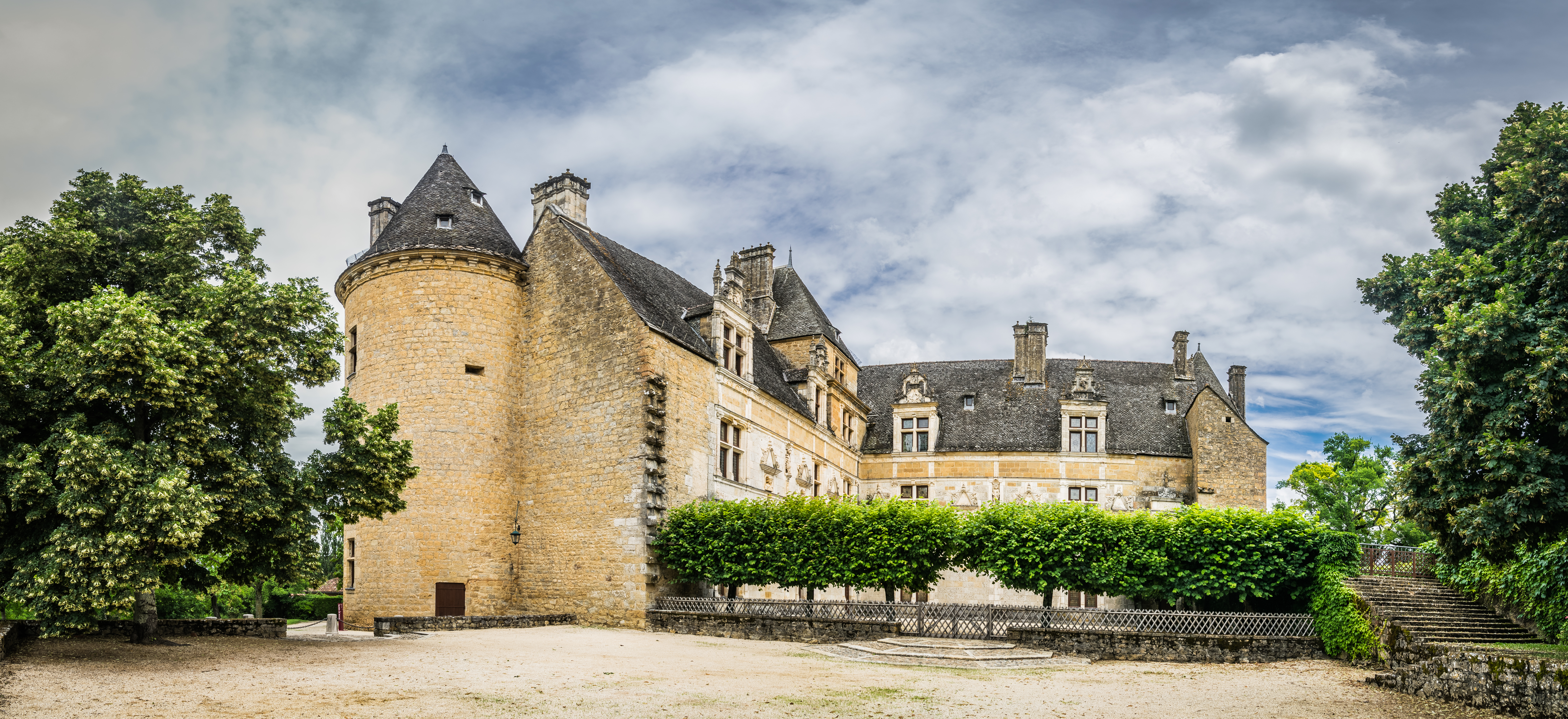

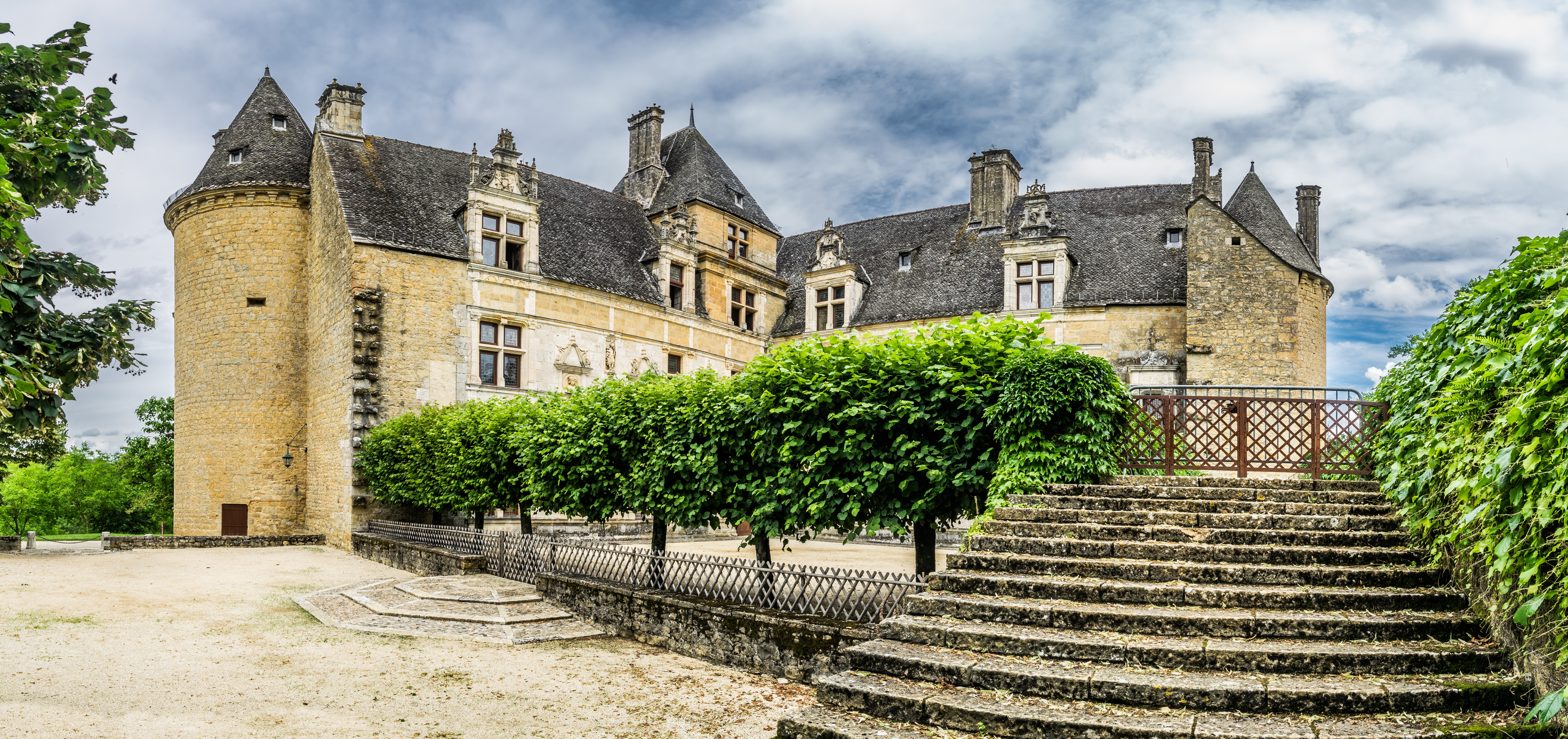
