= Saint-Jean-Lespinasse =

- Commune
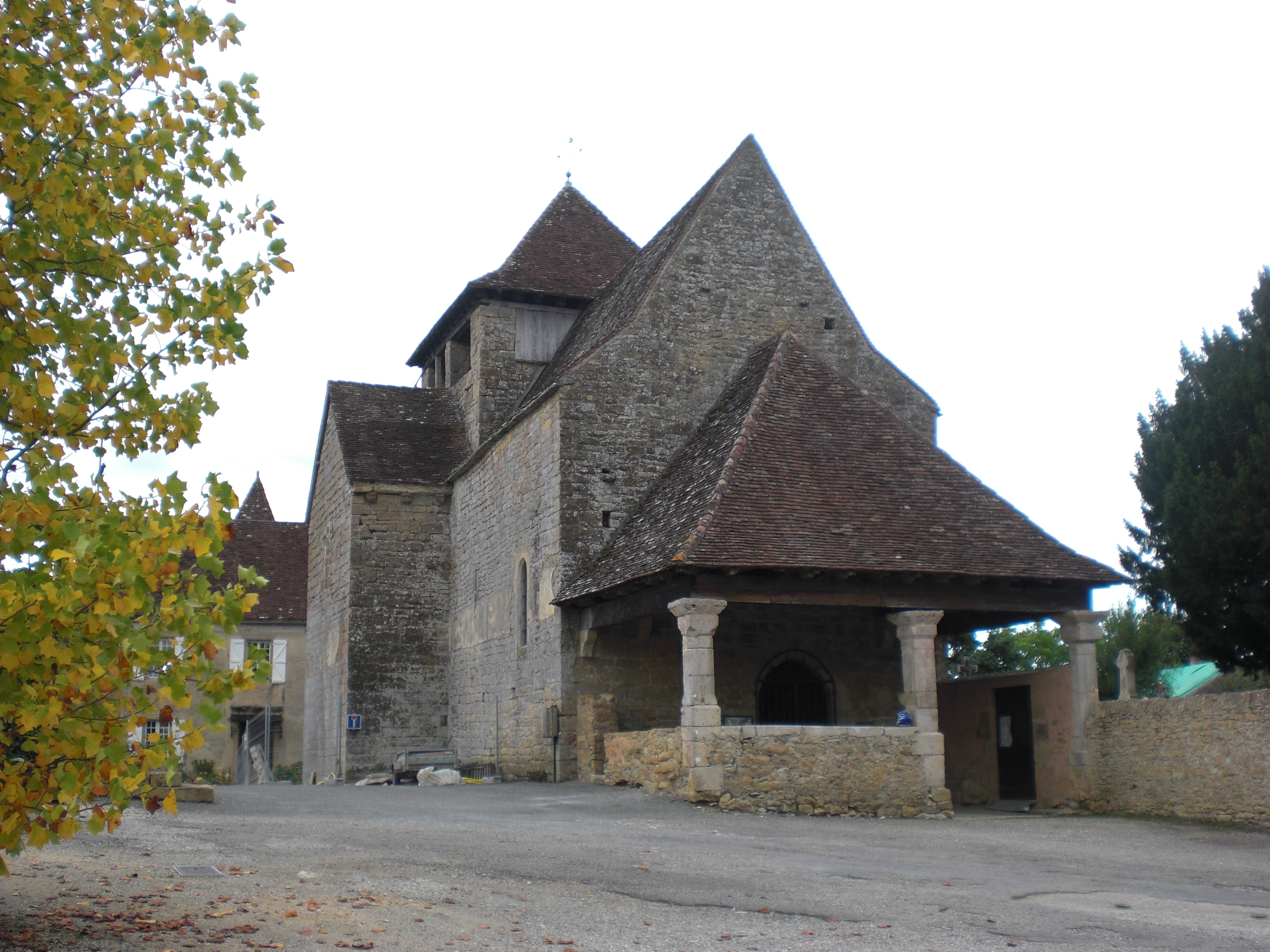
- The church of Saint-Jean-Baptiste
- Location of Saint-Jean-Lespinasse
- Location within France Location within Occitanie
- Coordinates: 44°51′49″N 1°51′42″E
- Country: France
- Region: Occitania
- Department: Lot
- Arrondissement: Figeac
- Canton: Saint-Céré

Government
  - Mayor (2020–2026): Sophie Boin
- Area^{1}: 5.99 km^{2} (2.31 sq mi)
- Elevation: 170 m (560 ft)
- Highest elevation: 407 m (1,335 ft)
- Lowest elevation: 141 m (463 ft)
- Population (2023): 404
  - Density: 67.4/km^{2} (175/sq mi)
- Time zone: UTC+01:00 (CET)
  - Summer (DST): UTC+02:00 (CEST)
- INSEE/Postal code: 46271 /46400
- ^{1} French Land Register data, which excludes lakes, ponds, glaciers > 1 km^{2} (0.386 sq mi or 247 acres) and river estuaries.

Saint-Jean-Lespinasse (French pronunciation: [sɛ̃ ʒɑ̃ lɛspinas]; Languedocien: Sent Joan Lespinassa) is a commune in the Lot department in south-western France.

== Toponymy ==
Espinasse is said to be based on the Occitan Espinassa (lit. large thorn), from the Latin 'spina' al meaning of "hawthorn" or "blackthorn" (also known as 'espina negra').

== Local culture and heritage ==
=== Places and monuments ===
- Château de Montal - Renaissance-style castle, which has been under the responsibility of the Centre des monuments nationaux since 1 October 2006. It is open to visitors. The building was partially classified and registered as a historical monument in 1909, 1955 and 1995.
- Chapelle du Château de Montal de Saint-Jean-Lespinasse;
- Église romane Saint-Jean-Baptiste - The church of Saint-Jean-Baptiste is a beautiful Romanesque building covered with flat tiles. Burned down in 1552. With a Romanesque crypt and a sculpted ensemble, the church received two teams of painters after its fire. It is possible to admire a pietà, the martyrdom of Saint Sebastian and an offering scene inside the building. An eighteenth-century funerary liter is also visible. The building was classified as a historical monument in 1913; Several objects are referenced in the Palissy database. The church has a crypt.
- Golf de Montal - In the commune, and very close to the castle, there is a nine-hole golf course with a lake.
- Césarines - It is claimed that this limestone cliff, where you can actually see walls several meters wide, was fortified by Julius Caesar at the time of the Gallic Wars, hence its name. Once proposed as the site of the battle of Uxellodunum, the Caesarines were quickly set aside in favour of the two major sites of Capdenac and Puy-d'Issolud. The latest archaeological studies have finished proving that the Puy-d'Issolud was indeed the site of Caesar's last and great battle in Gaul.
- Espace Culturel Orlando - Denise and Peter Orlando, artists who took up residence in Saint-Céré in the 1980s, donated some of their works to the municipality of Saint-Jean-Lespinasse. The Espace Orlando, located next to the church, has been open since the summer of 2007. It presents to the public a selection of ceramics by Peter and Denise, paintings by Peter (1921-2009) as well as various activities and exhibitions by artists.

== Notable people ==
- Antoine de Plas de Tanes (1737-?), lord of Montal and a deputy of the nobility to the States-General of 1789.
- Maurice Fenaille (1855-1937): an industrialist in love with the arts, he invested part of his fortune to rebuild the Château de Montal and prevent it from permanent ruin. He had to buy many parts of the castle that had been scattered around France and abroad, for example a fireplace was in the castle of the bishops of Angers in Villevêque, Maine-et-Loire. A patron, philanthropist and enthusiast, he offered this monument to the State after completing all the restorations.
- Anatole de Monzie (1876-1947): as a politician — he was Minister of Public Instruction in 1925 — and as a writer (author of the Tales of Saint Céré, among others) owned a manor house in Saint-Jean-Lespinasse at a place called Revery. His tomb can be seen in the old cemetery.
- Gérald Van der Kemp (1912-2001): a resistance fighter in the Lot maquis during the Second World War, he participated in the preservation of the works of the Louvre Museum — some were hidden for a time at the Château de Montal (including the Mona Lisa); he was married at Saint-Jean Lespinasse during the war. After the war, he was appointed curator of the Palace of Versailles. The Van der Kemp vault remains in the cemetery of Saint-Jean-Lespinasse but it is now empty.

== See also ==
- Communes of the Lot department
