= Arthur et Robert =

Paris-based wallpaper manufacturer

A c. 1800 Arthur et Robert block printed wallpaper border.

Arthur et Robert (also manufacture Arthur et Robert) was a Paris-based wallpaper manufacturer active during the late 18th and early 19th centuries.

Louis Figuier tells the story of how the first French wallpaper factory was set up: "The war with England having suspended trade relations between the two nations, and consequently the importation of wallpaper, a Parisian merchant named Robert, conceived a plan to establish and permanently secure the wallpaper industry in France.

Almost at the same time, an English watchmaker named Arthur, in partnership with one of his compatriots, set up a business in Paris, in the rue de l'Arbalète in which he had designs executed on paper, no longer with simple stencils but with carved woodblocks, as was the practice in England. Arthur and Robert having communicating their methods, they joined forces to carry out both types of production."

John (known in France as "Jean") Arthur was born in Oswestry, England, on March 25, 1716; he married in Paris on September 18, 1756 (with Suzanne Charlotte Dejean (ca 1736–1805), became Master Watchmaker in 1757.

John Arthur, "Papetier-Marchand pour meubles" established before 1772 on quai Conti, not far from the Pont Neuf, manufactured both "papier peint" (painted paper) and velvet paper. His success enabled him to buy land from Mr. d'Angivilliers and build a house on the rue Louis-Le-Grand. The owner of the Pavillon de Hanovre, across the street, the Maréchal de Richelieu, made complications for him. An invoice from 1781 shows that Arthur was still on Quai Conti; in 1784, the store and workshops were (or had been) transferred to the new address. The buildings of the "Manufacture de Papiers Tontisses (or velvet) et Peints" quickly became a tourist attraction featuring in guidebooks: "200 workers are employed there daily in the immense workshops, which allow the curious to follow all the manufacturing operations, whose details Mr. Arthur is pleased to make known to amateurs".

Tourist guides (Note: Luc-Vincent Thiéry, Guide des amateurs et des étrangers voyageurs a Paris, ou Description raisonnée de cette ville, de sa banlieue, & de tout ce qu'elles contiennent de remarquable. Volume 1 (A Guide for amateurs and foreigners travelling to Paris, or a reasoned description of this city, its suburbs, & all their remarkable features enriched with perspective views of the principal modern monuments by M. Thiéry, Paris, chez Hardouin & Gattey, 1787. Réveillon's workshops are also mentioned, pp. 639-639), Gallica:) drew travellers' attention to these attractions. We can read an account of one such visit, on August 10, 1784, in the diary of a Mrs Cradock translated into French. She mentions the exceptional quality of the wallpapers, the astonishing realism of the motifs depicted, the "terrace surrounded by an iron fence and overlooking a part of Paris and its surroundings", and "the six workshops. They are placed one below the other and each has its own specialty: one is for colouring, another for gilding, a third for printing, etc.".

This fits perfectly with a representation of Arthur's workshops by G. Moette. At the very top, one can see the terrace and the hot greenhouse, and below, one can follow all the stages in the manufacture of wallpaper, including the "mill and colour factory". The name of the company is shown on the frame: Arthur père et fils and Grenard.

It seems that "Gouverneur Morris took Thomas Jefferson on a day trip to visit "Old man Arthur's wallpaper factory" when they both lived in Paris" Thomas Jefferson, American Minister to the Court of Louis XVI (October 1785 – September 1789) placed orders at the Arthur et Grenard (and later, Arthur et Robert) shop in 1786 and 1790. In the Memorandum book for 1786, he noted "for Arthur for Paper hangings for hotel" - presumably the Hôtel de Langeac he then rented for his own residence. In 1790, Jefferson seems to have resided at Monticello.

According to John Grand-Carteret (1850–1927), a François Robert was received as a paper merchant in April 1767 and set up business Porte Montmartre, a stone's throw from the rue Louis-le-Grand. It is undoubtedly that shop that was called 'A l'empereur de la Chine'. In 1771, the same author added that Robert was now in the rue de la Place-Vendôme - the name of the rue Louis-le-Grand between 1798 or 1799 and 1814 - and writes that he appeared in the 1771 "Almanach des Marchands", with this indication: " Holds a shop selling velvety, English, Chinese, Indian-style wallpapers, etc." In the same list, Grand-Carteret mentions "Arthur et Robert, fabricants de papiers peints" (the same company), and "Arthur et Grenard, Marchands de papiers peints, on the old Boulevard, opposite the French Guards Regiment building", and he rightly envisages that it the same company. According to the Pop database, it was in 1775 that Arthur joined forces with the merchant René Grenard. (Note: René Grenard: ca 1749 - La Garenne-Colombes - guillotined July 29, 1794 - Paris. "Société entre Jean Arthur, fabriquant de papier peint, quai Conti, et René Grenard, marchand mercier et directeur de la fabrique de Jean Arthur", 1775. Francearchives:) The Pop base also shows some photos of their wallpapers. Grand-Carteret noticed a curious advertisement by the Arthur et Grenard manufacture which "Makes and sells women's belts, which are printed on satin ribbon, in the style of Etruscan paintings, arabesques and antique cameos." This highlights the links between the manufacture of wallpaper and printed fabrics. Both types of businesses employed decorative artists and painters.

Grand-Carteret adds that around 1788 the place took the name of "Manufacture de papiers peints pour Tentures et Décorations". The wallpaper factory became a "manufacture royale" on November 22, 1788. As a "fournisseur de la Maison du Roi", they supplied wallpapers for Versailles and the Tuileries Palace - whose unique wallpaper supplier they were. (Note: Bernard Jacqué notes that Arthur and Grenard were the only wallpaper manufacturer to do business with the King's household and adds ( note 459) that Jean-Baptiste Réveillon did not: .)

When at the end of the Women's March on Versailles, in October 1789, the Royal family were brought from Versailles to the dilapidated Tuileries Palace in Paris, some decorating work was in order. Marie-Antoinette had the walls of her dining room covered with green (cendre verte, or green ash) paper, with all around it hundreds of feet of "Tors de fleurs" floral paper (probably garlands of flowers), along with 229 paper rosettes to adorn the spandrels. This sparked a trend across Europe for plain backgrounds with floral borders. Jacqué also mentions a letter from Nicolas Dollfus's new manufacture in Mulhouse to the great painter Joseph-Laurent Malaine requiring him to provide designs for such decorative paper strips featuring flowers, previously exclusive to Paris (specifically crafted by Réveillon and by Arthur et Grenard). In the first appendix of his PhD thesis, Jacqué gives a complete list of the wallpapers supplied "pour l'Appartement du Roy" aux Tuileries to redecorate the Cabinet de travail du Roy and adjoining library, the antechamber, the King's bedchamber and alcove, the Queen's dining room, etc. And there were other "appartments" that were redecorated at the Tuileries.

In 1789, the factory changed hands when François Robert, who had been Arthur Sr's partner, purchased it. He formed a partnership with Arthur Jr., Jean-Jacques. This may have something to do with the fact that when the duc de Richelieu died, the Folie Richelieu was put on sale for "120.000 livres de principal" (i.e. excluding other costs) and acquired by Jean Arthur and his wife, his son Jean-Jacques Arthur, and René Grenard. They took possession of their new and vast property located only about 1 kilometre North of their current premises, on June 26, 1789, with no doubt some very ambitious plans in mind, but this rather ill-timed investment came to nothing.

During the Revolution, the firm was renamed "Manufacture de papiers peints pour tentures et décorations des citoyens Arthur et Robert, Rue des Piques au coin du boulevard" - the rue des Piques being none other than the old rue Louis-le-Grand. The stability of businesses was always threatened by poor payments, debtors who had disappeared or become insolvent, irregular supplies, etc. The new owner, Robert, also had to meet his financial commitments, since he had had to take out two loans, 1789 and 1791, to buy the company.

In May 1791, the Arthur and Robert Company suffered a serious loss as a result of the circulation of false bills of exchange issued by counterfeiters, including one they employed as printer. The following year, the scarcity of cash made it impossible for them (for a time, at least) to pay the salaries of their 400 employees: the Treasury only agreed to change 1,800 pounds of assignats per week into cash, an insufficient sum.

Another problem was the instability of a workforce that was always too ready to leave the workshops to take part in a riot or join the defence of the country. Robert's workers were particularly involved: following the insurrection of slaves, at the beginning of the Haitian Revolution, which many compared to the storming of the Bastille by the Parisians, L'Auditeur national notes that "The workers at Messrs Arthur and Robert's wallpaper factory gave 600 livres in écus.

The revolutionary period also offered all kinds of opportunities to entrepreneurs clever enough to seize them (like Jean-Démosthène Dugourc who designed "truly republican wallpaper") and respond to the orders of the new powers, with wallpapers showing moving revolutionary symbols. (Note: One of Arthur et Robert's designs displayed Marianne personifying the French Republic: " La France Républicaine Ouvrant son Sein à tous les Français" described as a "Female bust, almost full face, breasts uncovered, surrounded by rays, in an oval; red bonnet adorned with a cockade and surmounted by a rooster, tricoloured sash, a spirit level suspended from a ribbon of the same colour around the neck." Jean Laran, Marcel Aubert and Marcel Roux, Collection De Vinck. 3, La Législative et la Convention, Bibliothèque nationale de France. Département des estampes et de la photographie, 1921, p. 613 (item number 6074). On Gallica: )) Robert thus redecorated the premises of the National Convention and (later) the Directoire au Luxembourg.

The most striking fact of the period is that Jean-Jacques Arthur and René Grenard were very much involved in the Revolution. According to H. Clouzot (p. 106), Jean-Jacques Arthur, who was close to Robespierre, presided over the Jacobins Saint-Honoré district from 21 May 1790. He is remembered for renting part of the château de Bercy in the hope of setting up a wallpaper factory or transferring the other one:, and he received Robespierre, who came there to rest, if we are to believe Mme Campan speaking here to her former pupil Queen Hortense: "This beautiful place was saved during the Terror, by whom? by Robespierre. His friend Arthur, a section leader, had rented it out and Robespierre used to come here to rest after signing the death warrant for so many Frenchmen. There, he went fishing peacefully, and according to the report of the gardeners, he felt sorry for himself when a carp caught on his line struggled on the lawn, and this at the very hour when fifty or sixty heads were separated from their bodies by his order".

Arthur was also charged with the inspection of the Temple tower where the royal family had been relegated: he denounced François Adrien Toulan and Jacques François Lepitre, "who hold conversations in low voices with the prisoners of the Temple and stoop to excite Marie-Antoinette's gaiety". He asked to testify against Danton at the latter's trial but spoke at the Jacobin Club on 5 April (16 Germinal) 1794, immediately after Robespierre, as part of the plot to eliminate Danton, and declared: "I was summoned to testify before the Revolutionary Tribunal regarding important facts incriminating the conspirators. The jury considered itself sufficiently informed, and I was not given the opportunity to speak. In accordance with Robespierre’s motion, I have come to present to you what I was due to say before the tribunal.”

Arthur ended up being dragged along himself, Danton's death being shortly followed by that of Robespierre and Robespierrists: Jean-Jacques Arthur was guillotined on 30 July 1794, and Grenard on 7 August.

Arthur and Grenard had actively participated in the final efforts to save Robespierre. Along with the painter Claude-Louis Châtelet (also from the Section des Piques), they were members of the "Committee of Execution" established by the Paris Commune on 9 Thermidor Year II (27 July 1794). This was an extraordinary body set up to organise an insurrection against the National Convention, following the model of previous revolutionary uprisings. The attempt failed, and Robespierre was arrested.

Arthur also tried (in vain) to rouse the residents of the village of Bercy: “Patriots of Bercy, come at once, armed, to the General Council of the Paris Commune to defend the rights of liberty and the cause of the patriots oppressed by conspirators [those of the Convention].” When the Maison Commune was stormed by the expeditionary force led by Léonard Bourdon, Grenard managed to escape, but only for a short time.

For Robert, the former business partner of a man who "was said to have eaten the blood-dripping heart of a Swiss guard killed in the defence of the Tuileries", getting the company back on its feet after the revolutionary turmoil cannot have been an easy task.

In 1795, Le Journal du Lycée des arts: inventions et découvertes mentions two "wallpaper manufactures", that of Citizen Réveillon, "conducted today with the greatest order and intelligence by Citizens Jacquemard and Bénard" and "that which is brought to the highest degree of prosperity by Citizen Robert. (Mention très-honorable)".

After the worst episodes of the revolutionary period, however, many companies sought help to get back on their feet. In 1797, Robert asked for financial aid, without which, he threatened, it would be impossible to keep all his workers. Jacquemart and Bénard, Réveillon's successors, used the same argument again in 1799. The year 1799 also brought news of an invention by Louis-Nicolas Robert (with no known connection to our Robert): a machine for making rolls of wallpaper up to 15 meters long.

The workshops were once again open to visitors. One of the tourists was a Miss Berry, on March 20, 1802, but she was slightly disappointed: "We went to the paper store on the boulevard. Formerly this store was run by Arthur: now, by Robert. The papers we were shown are velvety, plain, to resemble cassimere; the borders too are velvety and to a very fine effect. But here again, the taste is less good than I expected."

In August 1803, Robert once again requested assistance from the Minister of the Interior. Henri Clouzot admits to not having found out whether Robert received satisfaction, but tells us that the company continued, under the name Robert frères et Cie, and in May 1807 received substantial aid in the form of a loan payable from month to month. We don't know exactly why, but the brothers soon had a successor, Joseph Guillot ... who also asked for help, on July 28, 1809. Clouzot assumes that he was unable to save the company "as he was no longer to be found in the directories after 1814." This is not correct: Guillot does appear in the "Almanach du commerce de Paris" (p. 290) in 1813: "Guillot, successeur d'Arthur et Robert, rue de la Place-Vendôme, 27, au coin du boulevart" and again in 1817: "Guillot, négociant fabricant de papiers peints, manuf. royale, rue Louis-le-Grand, 27". He no longer appears in 1820. (Note: Henri Clouzot, Histoire du Papier peint, pages 142 - 148. Guillot did not change addresses: it is the name of the street that changed back to what it was before the Revolution - a name it has kept since.) So the firm seems to have finally closed down at some point between 1817 and 1820.

At the end of his book, Clouzot recalls a stanza written in honour of the Parisian wallpaper manufacturers who exhibited their products under porticoes at the 1800 Exposition des Produits de l'Industrie Française:

"Les papiers que chacun aime / Sont d'Annonay ou d'Angoulême: / Robert, Jacquemart, Simon, / Ont toujours un grand renom." (Note: "The papers everyone loves / Are from Annonay or Angoulême: / Robert, Jacquemart, Simon, / Still have a great reputation": Le Chansonnier aux Portiques, ou Coup d'œil d'un amateur sur l'Exposition des produits de l'industrie française, 1806. Gallica:)

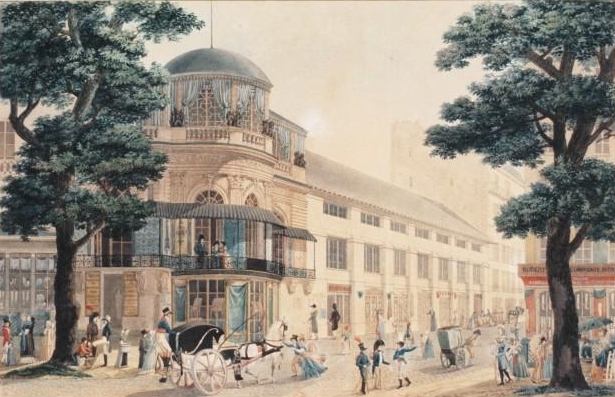
Pavillon de Hanovre (left) and Arthur et Robert (right)

== Style ==
When Mrs Cradock visited the premises, she insisted on the fact that the wallpapers perfectly imitated flowers (obviously, considering that one of the painters working for Arthur et Grenard was Joseph-Laurent Malaine), lanterns, etc., so much so that "you have to touch them to convince yourself of the reality".

As for the subjects, she mentions "fabrics embroidered with flowers", "sculptural subjects", a sky in a wooden frame, more frames seemingly made of glass.

According to Henri Clouzot, Robert printed plain velvety papers and "arabesques of flowers, landscapes, architectural motifs, busts, antique vases, bas-reliefs imitating bronze and marble, allegorical figures of natural size, imitations of sculptures". Grand Carteret notes in particular "a complete decoration in grisaille, with overdoors, printed panels, architectural ornaments" representing mythological scenes ("Apollo and Daphne after Van Loo, Pygmalion and his statue, Orpheus charming the beasts, the Sacrifice of Iphigénie after Delafosse, the Offering to Pan, Pyramus and Thisbe").

== Iconography ==
Apart from the cross-section of the workshops mentioned above, there are at least two representations of Arthur et Robert's premises, one a quick sketch by Eugène Cicéri dated 1839, and the other one a refined drawing by François Debret dated "between 1800 and 1850".

The first one, Rue Louis-le-Grand en 1839, actuel 2ème arrondissement, shows the façades of Arthur et Robert's (on the right) and of the "Pavillon de Hanovre" (on the left). The street in the middle is the rue Louis-le-Grand. Arthur died in 1801, and Robert was probably dead too by 1839, but the name of their business still appears: "Anciennement manufacture royale d'Arthur et Robert". Guillot's name appears too, above, but the shop is now "Béthemont, magazin du bas": a hosier's shop and a factory since 1820.

The second drawing is Pavillon de Hanovre. Boulevard des Italiens. On the left is the Pavillon, and on the right, behind the tree, one can see hoses in the shop window of what used to be Arthur and Robert's - above the door one can read "Robert Frères & Compagnie Fabri" - the word "fabricant" is interrupted. Below is the new business name: Fecon, fabricant de bas de toute espèce. We know of one Fecon or Fecond who was a hosier in 1820 and had a shop minutes away from there. He may have converted the company before Béthemont took over. It is really interesting to notice that across the street from this shop is Charles Simon's wallpaper shop. Simon arrived in 1790 or 1806. On the first floor, under an awning, are displayed a few samples of wallpaper. A little further up the rue Louis-le-Grand is the entrance to the "fabrique" (factory).

== Bibliography ==
- Halsey, R.T. Haines. "Wall-Papers and Paint in the New American Wing ." The Metropolitan Museum of Art Bulletin. Vol. 19, No. 10. The Metropolitan Museum of Art: October 1924, pp. 236–238.
- Jacqué (Bernard), De la manufacture au mur: pour une histoire matérielle du papier peint (1770-1914), sous la direction de Serge Chassagne, Lyon: Université Lumière Lyon 2, 2003
- Kosuda-Warner, Joanne, and Elisabeth Johnson. Landscape Wallcoverings. Scala Publishers in association with the Cooper-Hewitt, National Design Museum, Smithsonian Institution.
- Helen Bieri-Thomson, "Un salon parisien au cœur du Jura", in Passé simple 71, Jan. 2022, pp. 20–22.
