= Bernd Metz =

German artist and curator

Bernd Metz (*1979 in Landau) is a German artist and curator. He works and lives in Frankfurt am Main, Germany.

Bernd Metz studied Art and Cultural Studies at the Goethe University in Frankfurt, Germany from 2004 to 2010 and art and philosophy at the Universitat Autònoma de Barcelona, Spain in 2008. He graduated as Magister Artium and is an alumnus of the German National Academic Foundation.

He is one of the founders of the artist group spezialLabor, co-founder and co-director of the toll ffm – galerie für zeitgenössische kunst in Frankfurt. In 2012 he was a lecturer, pdh-candidate and research assistant for Visual Culture Studies at the Goethe University in Frankfurt. He is working as a freelance curator and art mediator for several institutions.

In 2014, he was resident artist at the art studio of the National Museum of Modern and Contemporary Art, Seoul, South Korea, and in Vienna, Austria, for the Kulturamt Frankfurt am Main.
