= Charles-Frédéric Soehnée =

French painter

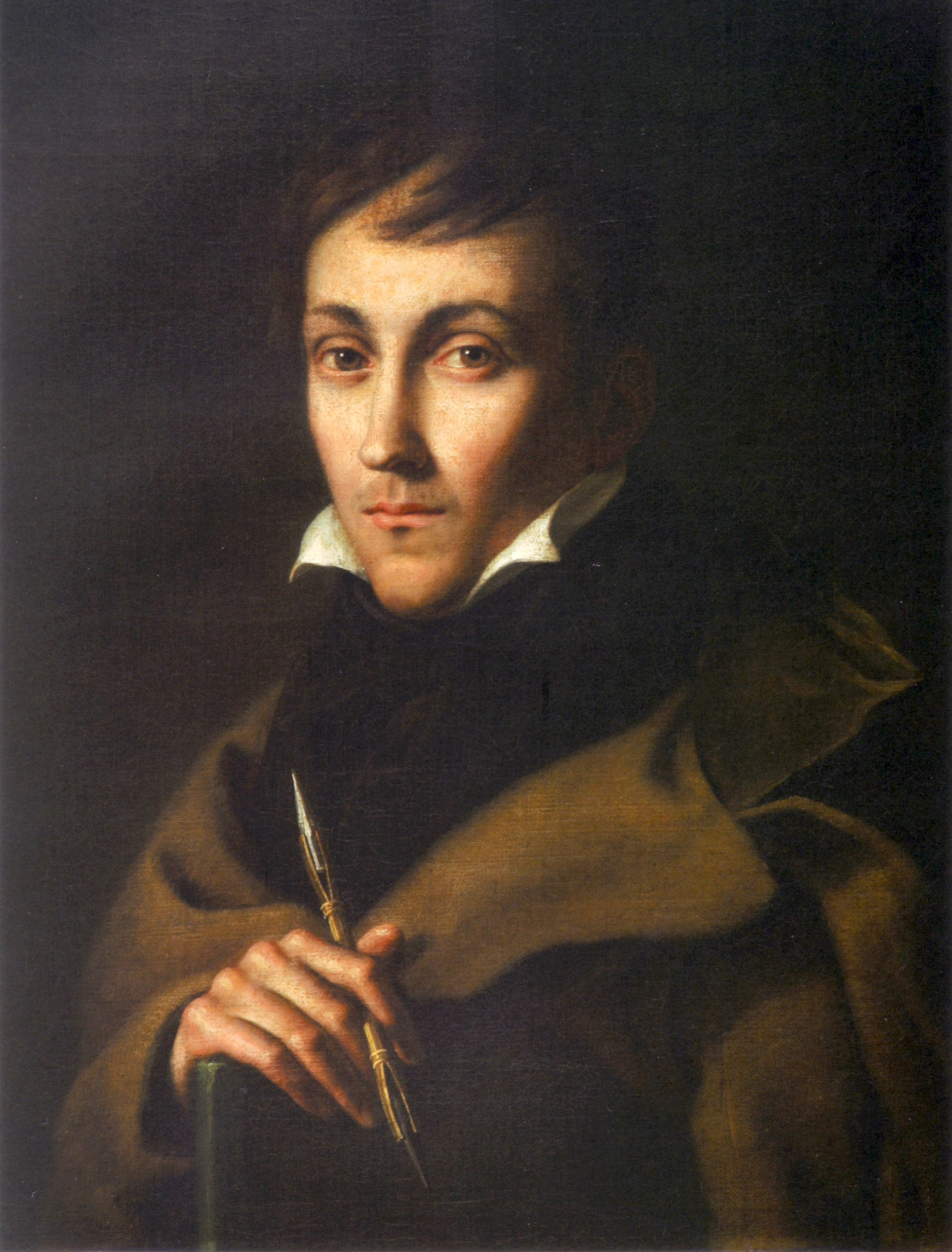
Charles-Frédéric Soehnée, painting by Pierre-Louis Delaval, 1812

Charles-Frédéric Soehnée (3 November 1789, in Landau in der Pfalz as Carl-Friederich Söhne – 1 May 1878, in Le Pré-Saint-Gervais in Paris) was a French painter. He was the fourth child of merchant Jacques Frédéric Soehnée and Caroline Wilhelmine (née Krueger).

In 1797 his family founded the company "Soehnée l'aîné & Cie". Their factories were located in the cities of Mulhouse, Colmar and Munster in Alsace. Their headquarters were in Paris where Soehnée eventually moved with his family.

In Paris Soehnée studied under the neoclassical painter Anne Louis Girodet de Roussy-Trioson. His classmate and friend Pierre Louis de Laval (1790-1842) painted a portrait of him in 1812. In 1818, he executed a group of more than one hundred drawings, watercolors, and at least one lithograph, most of which depict grotesque scenes of imaginary beasts and travelers against the backdrop of desert landscapes.

Soehnée researched and studied the techniques of the old masters, culminating in a technical treatise published in 1822 where he disputed the commonly held belief that Jan van Eyck invented oil painting. In it, he argued that the a mixture of encaustic and varnish could be the only explanation for the existence of much older paintings.

Soehnée went on to make a varnish and co-found the company Soehnée Frères in 1829 with one of his brothers, and became wealthy as a result. As far as is known, he never painted again after 1818.

Soehnée possessed a collection of drawings from Baroque painter Joseph Parrocel (1646–1704), which are now owned by the Louvre.

== Bibliography ==
Mauries, Patrick Charles Frédéric Soehnée. Gallimard / Galerie J-M Le Fell 2006.
