= Landau =

Landau in der Pfalz
- Town
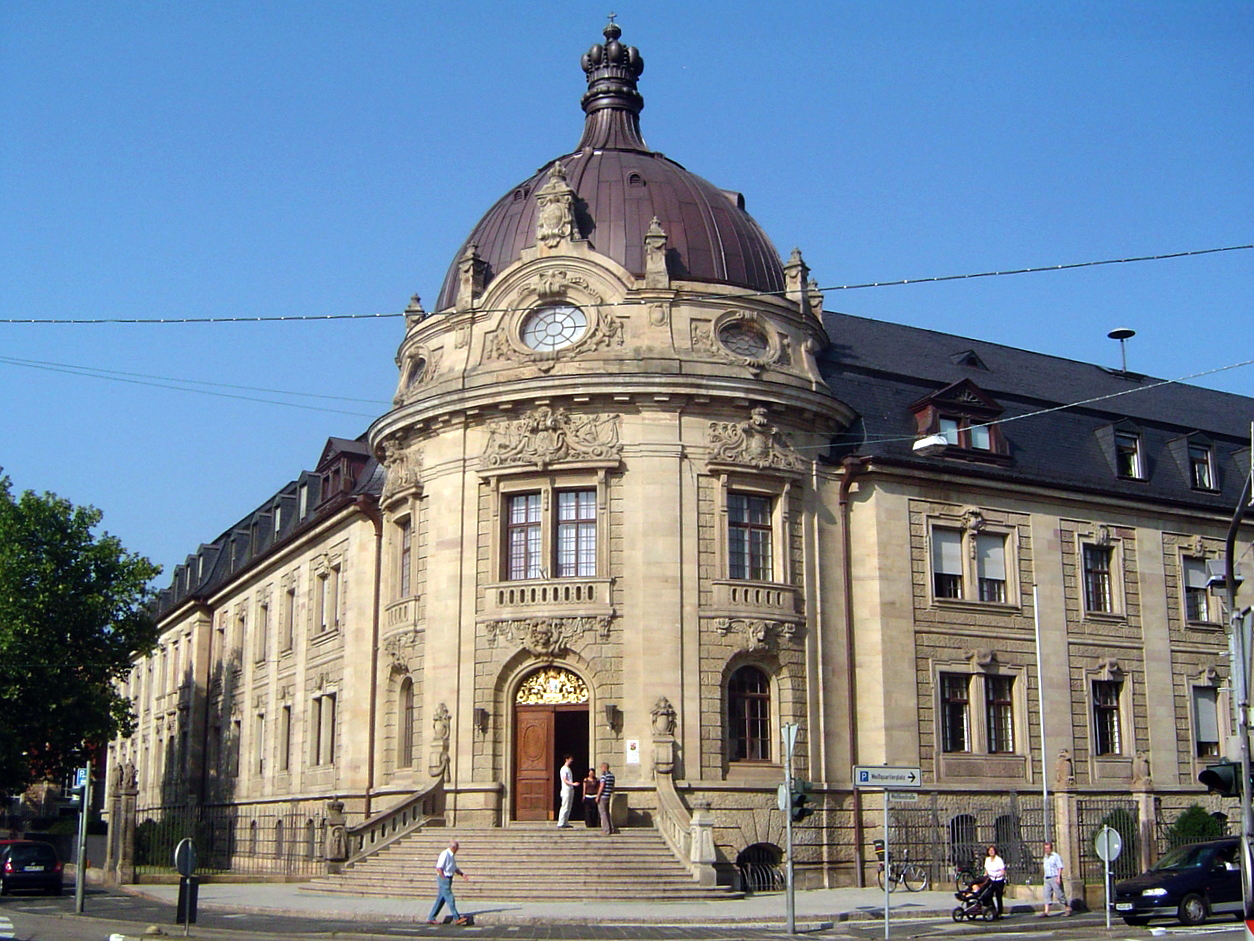
- Courthouse

- Flag Coat of arms
- Interactive map of Landau in der Pfalz
- Location within Germany Location within Rhineland-Palatinate
- Coordinates: 49°12′N 8°7′E
- Country: Germany
- State: Rhineland-Palatinate
- District: Urban district
- Subdivisions: 8 Ortsteile

Government
  - Mayor (2023–31): Dominik Geißler (CDU)

Area
  - Total: 82.94 km^{2} (32.02 sq mi)
- Elevation: 142 m (466 ft)

Population (2025-12-31)
  - Total: 48,280
  - Density: 582.1/km^{2} (1,508/sq mi)
- Time zone: UTC+01:00 (CET)
  - Summer (DST): UTC+02:00 (CEST)
- Postal codes: 76829
- Dialling codes: 06341
- Vehicle registration: LD
- Website: www.landau.de

Landau (Palatine German: Landach), officially Landau in der Pfalz (German pronunciation: [ˈlandaʊ ʔɪn deːɐ̯ ˈpfalts], lit. 'Landau in the Palatinate'), is an autonomous (kreisfrei) town surrounded by the Südliche Weinstraße ("Southern Wine Route") district of southern Rhineland-Palatinate, Germany. It is a university town (since 1990), a long-standing cultural centre, and a market and shopping town, surrounded by vineyards and wine-growing villages of the Palatinate wine region. Landau lies east of the Palatinate Forest, on the German Wine Route.

It contains the districts (Ortsteile) of Arzheim, Dammheim, Godramstein, Mörlheim, Mörzheim, Nussdorf, Queichheim, and Wollmesheim.

== History and other settings ==
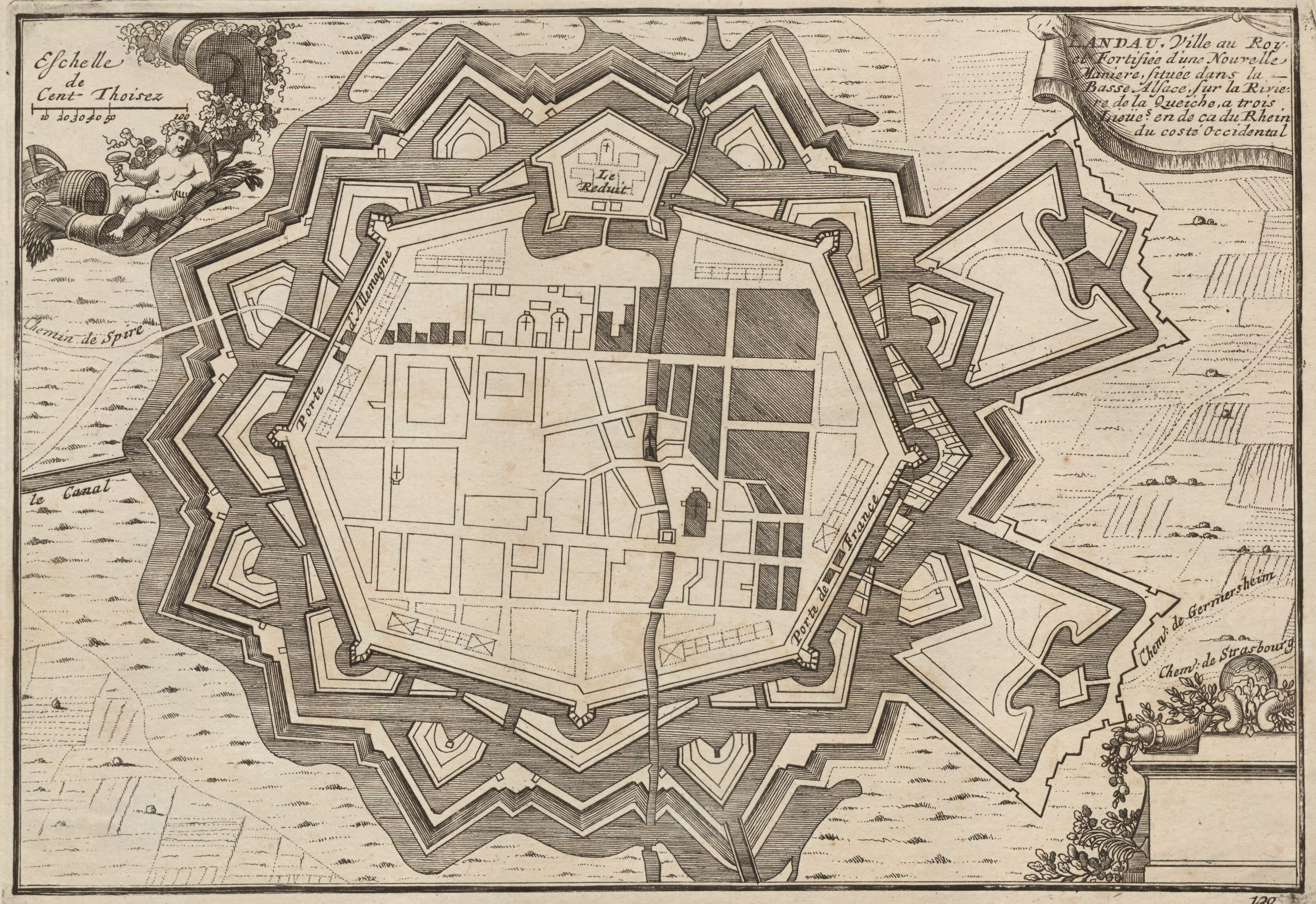
Fortress of Landau 1695

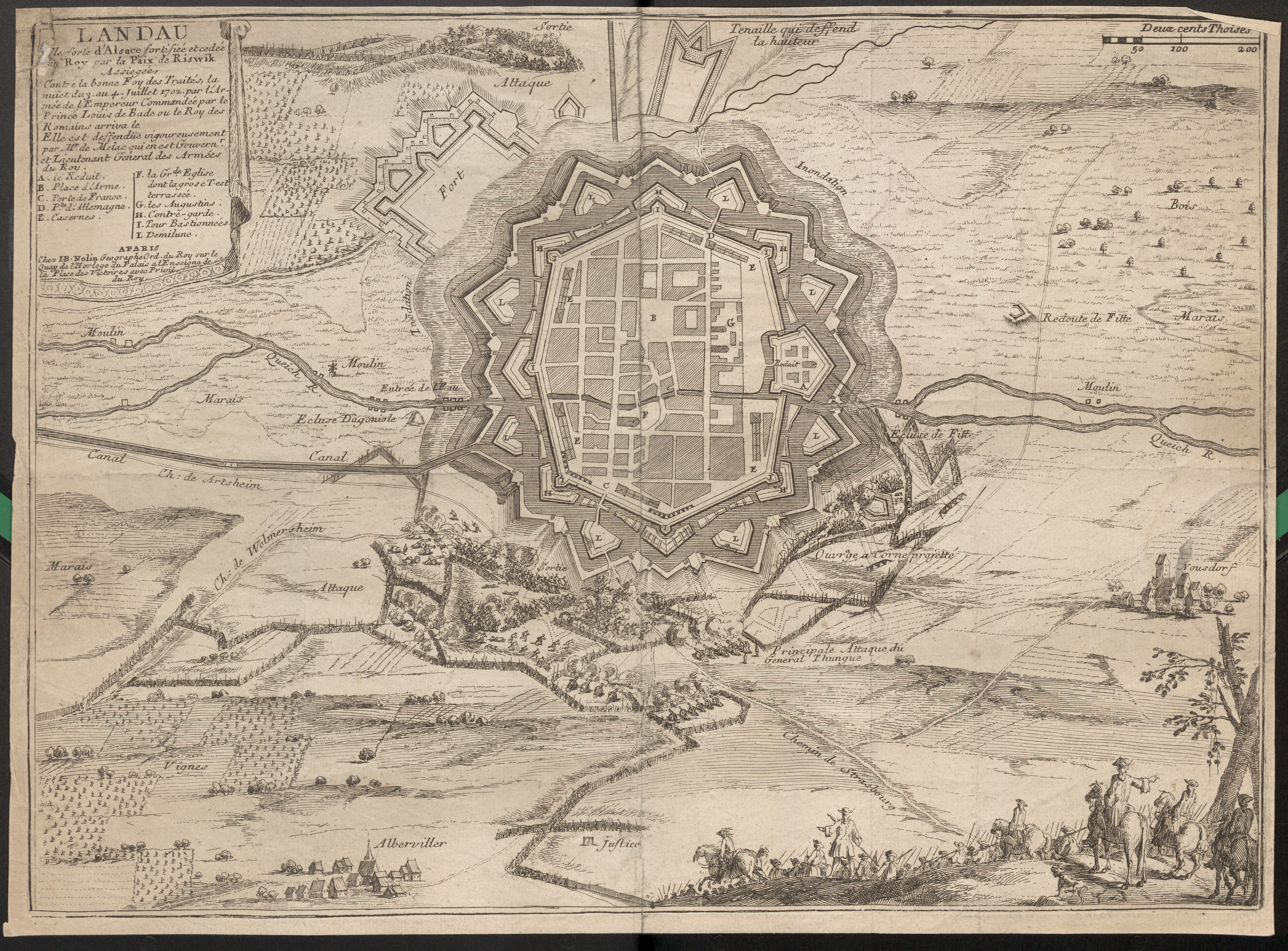
Siege of Landau 1702

Landau was first mentioned as a settlement in 1106. It was in the possession of the counts of Leiningen-Dagsburg-Landeck, whose arms, differenced by an escutcheon of the Imperial eagle, served as the arms of Landau until 1955. The town was granted a charter in 1274 by King Rudolf I of Germany, who declared the town a Free Imperial Town in 1291; nevertheless Prince-Bishop Emich of Speyer, a major landowner in the district, seized the town in 1324. The town did not regain its ancient rights until 1511 from Maximilian I. An Augustinian monastery was founded in 1276. It has also helped provide college education for the past 28 years.

After the Peace of Westphalia in 1648, control of Landau was ceded to France, although with certain ill-defined reservations. Landau was later part of France from 1680 to 1815, during which it was one of the Décapole, the ten free cities of Alsace, and received its modern fortifications by Louis XIV's military architect Vauban in 1688–1699, making the little town (its 1789 population was approximately 5,000) one of Europe's strongest citadels. In the War of the Spanish Succession, it had four sieges. After the siege of 1702 lost by the French, an Imperial garrison was installed in Landau. In a subsequent siege from 13 October to 15 November 1703 the French regained the town, following their victory in the Battle of Speyerbach. A third siege, begun on 12 September 1704 by Louis, Margrave of Baden-Baden, ended on 23 November 1704 with a French defeat. During this siege King Joseph I arrived at Landau coming from Vienna in a newly developed convertible carriage. This carriage would become very popular and was named the landau in English, or Landauer in German. The French recaptured Landau once more in a final siege which lasted from 6 June to 20 August 1713 by Marshal General Villars. Landau was part of the Bas-Rhin department between 1789 and 1815. After Napoleon's Hundred Days following his escape from Elba, Landau, which had remained French, was granted to the Kingdom of Bavaria in 1815 and became the capital of one of the thirteen Bezirksämter (counties) of the Bavarian Rheinkreis, later renamed Pfalz.

In 1840 famous political cartoonist Thomas Nast was born in Landau. Following World War II, Landau was an important barracks town for the French occupation.

== Main sites ==
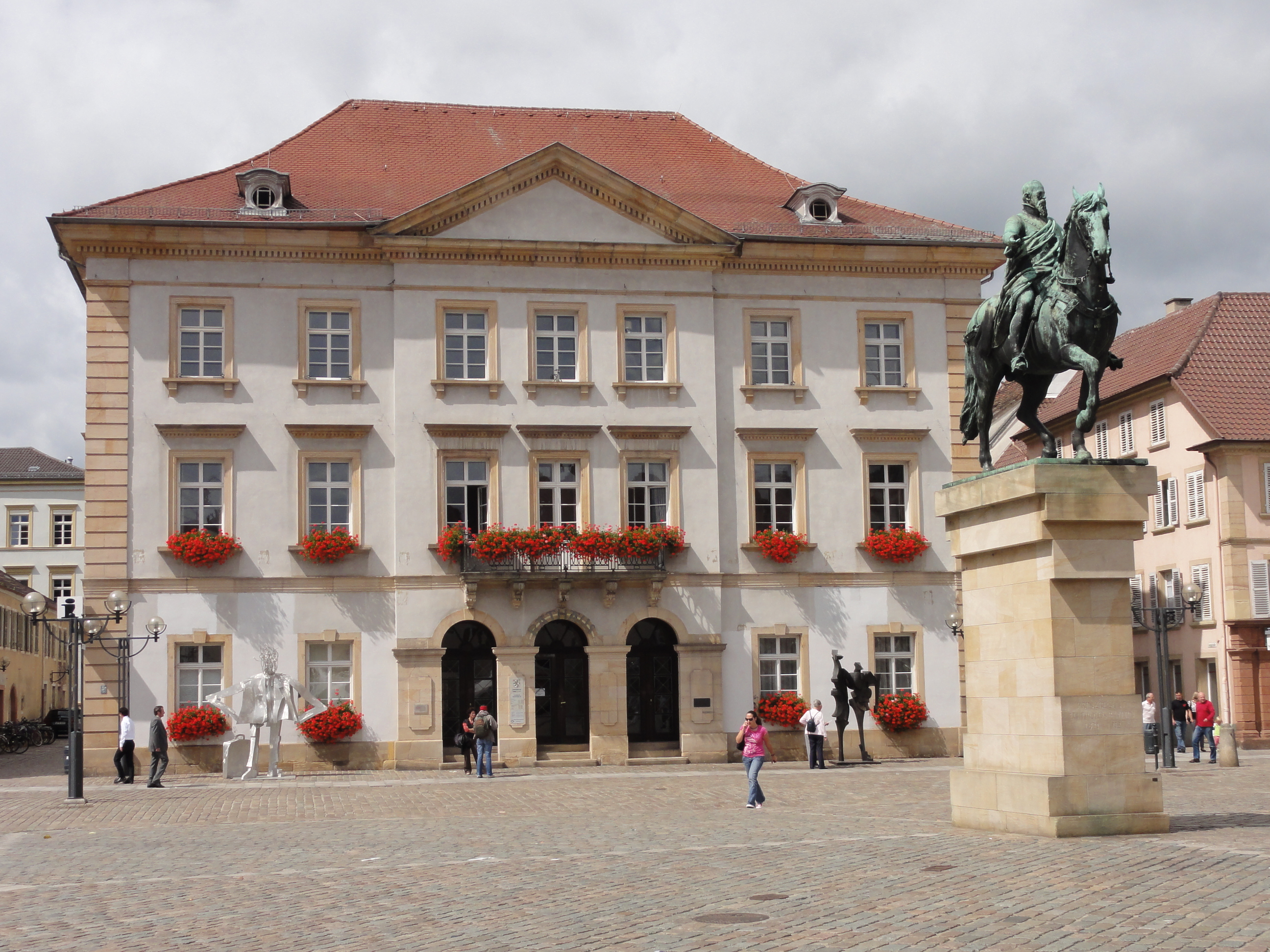
Landau's main square Rathausplatz

Landau's large main square (Rathausplatz) is dominated by the town hall (Rathaus) and the market hall (Altes Kaufhaus). In the 19th century, the former fortifications gave way to a ring road that encircles the old town centre, from which the old industrial buildings have been excluded. A convention hall, the Festhalle, was built in Art Nouveau style, 1905–1907, on a rise overlooking the town park and facing the modernist Bundesamt, the regional government building. The Protestant Collegiate Church (Stiftskirche) in Landau in der Pfalz is one of the oldest buildings in the town. The construction of the church started in the 14th century and was completed in the mid-16th century.

The zoo is located close to the centre of Landau alongside the historical fortifications. Animals are held in natural enclosures. The zoo contains numerous exotic species such as tigers and cheetahs, but also seals, penguins, kangaroos, flamingos and many more.

== Economy ==
Wine-making continues to be an important industry of Landau.

== Transport ==
The nearest airports to Landau are:

- Karlsruhe/Baden-Baden Airport, located 66 km (41 mi) south
- Saarbrücken Airport, located 98 km (61 mi) west
- Strasbourg Airport, located 111 km (69 mi) south west
- Stuttgart Airport, located 114 km (71 mi) south east
- Frankfurt Airport, located 123 km (76 mi) north east

== Culture ==
The "landau," a luxury open carriage with a pair of folding tops, was invented in the town during the War of the Spanish Succession.

A frequent Ashkenazi surname originates in this town. Probably its most famous bearer was Yechezkel Landau, an 18th-century talmudist and halakhist and the chief rabbi of Prague.

== Twin towns – sister cities ==
Landau in der Pfalz is twinned with:

- Haguenau, France
- Ribeauvillé, France
- Ruhango, Rwanda

== Notable people ==
- Jan Boner (1463–1523), German-Polish merchant and banker
- Johann Caspar Bagnato (1696–1757), German-Italian architect
- Johann Christoph Wendland (1755–1828), botanist
- Johann Birnbaum (1763–1832), jurist
- Jacques-Louis Copia (1764–1799), German-French engraver
- Charles-Frédéric Soehnée (1789–1878), German-French painter
- Heinrich Jakob Fried (1802–1870), painter
- François Fleischbein (1804–1878), painter
- Franz Joseph Lauth (1822–1895), egyptologist
- Marcus Otterbourg (1827–1893), American diplomat, lawyer, and judge
- Michel Bréal (1832–1915), German-French philologist
- Ludwig Levy (1854–1907), architect
- Jakob Ritter von Danner (1865–1942), general
- Ludwig Maria Hugo (1871–1935), Roman Catholic bishop in Mainz
- Heinrich Kaspar Schmid (1874–1953), composer
- Franz Ritter von Hörauf (1878–1957), general
- Helmuth Theodor Bossert (1880–1961), art historian, philologist and archaeologist
- Ludwig Kohl-Larsen (1884–1969), physician
- Arnold Metzger (1892–1974), philosopher
- Ferdinand Jodl (1896–1956), general
- Ernst Maisel (1896–1978), general
- Thomas Nast (1840–1902), American caricaturist and editorial cartoonist
- Gustav Harteneck (1892–1984), general
- Lil Picard (1899–1994), German-American cabaret actress
- Richard Rudolf Klein (1921–2011), composer, musician and teacher
- Friedrich Wetter (born 1928), Roman Catholic bishop in Munich
- Fritz Strack (born 1950), psychologist
- Albrecht Hornbach (born 1953), businessman
- Volker Zotz (born 1956), German-Austrian philosopher and writer
- Éric de Moulins-Beaufort (born 1962), French prelate of the Roman Catholic Church
- Anne Lünenbürger (born 1964), operatic soprano
- Charlotte Seither (born 1965), composer and pianist
- Christine Schneider (born 1972), politician (CDU)
- Bas Kast (born 1973), science writer
- Alexander Schweitzer (born 1973), politician (SPD)
- Stefan Raunser (born 1976), scientist
- Bernd Metz (born 1979), artist
- Kris Menace (born 1980), electronic musician
- Benjamin Auer (born 1981), footballer
- Marlene Zapf (born 1990), handball player
- Michael Schultz (born 1993), footballer
- Ricarda Lobe (born 1994), hurdler
- Jan May (born 1995), cyclist
- Niklas Hoffmann (born 1997), footballer
