= Queichheim =

Coordinates: 49°11′50″N 8°08′23″E

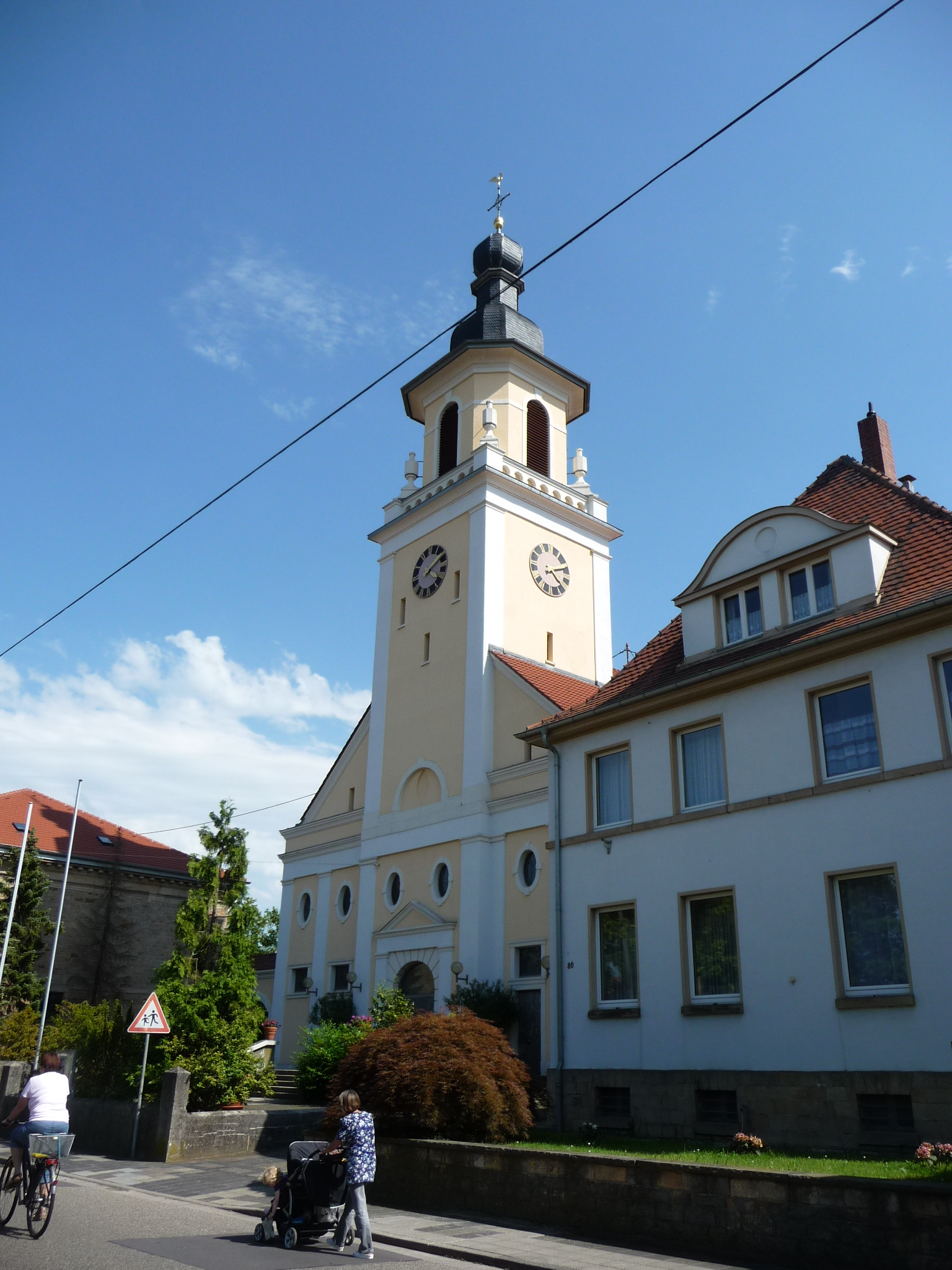

Queichheim (German pronunciation: [ˈkvaɪçhaɪm]) is a quarter of Landau in der Pfalz in the German state of Rhineland-Palatinate. Queichheim, with about 3,100 inhabitants as of 2004, is located east of the railroad line from Karlsruhe to Neustadt, south of the Queich River, and it borders on the inner city.

== History ==
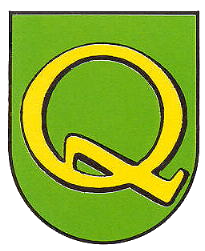
Queichheim's former coat of arms

Queichheim was presumably founded by a Frank named Cogich, Cogin or Cogo, since old manuscripts from the abbey at Weißenburg from the 7th century always mention Cogichheim or Cogisheim. It is almost certain that they refer to today's Queichheim.

Stone coffins found during excavation for today's Evangelical church in 1769 indicate that the area was settled in the time of the Merovingians (7th to 8th century). Later, the name mentioned above, which had no significance to the inhabitants, was changed to Queichheim (village on the Queich).

The oldest documents record the gift of the Daumühlen near Queichheim from the Bishop Guntram of Speyer to the monastery of Hördt. One hundred years later, Diether von Queichheim had a castle in the village. Until 1274, the developing town of Landau belonged to the parish of Queichheim. Since 1937, Queichheim and Mörlheim together have been a quarter of Landau.

As of the beginning of 2004, Queichheim had about 3,100 inhabitants.

== Politics ==
The quarter's chairman (as of 2004) is Jürgen Doll (CDU).
