= Maurice Fenaille =

Maurice Fenaille (12 June 1855 – 11 December 1937) was a French businessman and pioneer in the petroleum industry. He was also a major amateur art historian, collector and patron.

== Bibliography ==
Fenaille (Maurice), État général des tapisseries de la manufacture des Gobelins depuis son origine jusqu'à nos jours, 1907, IV, p. 410.
