= Château de Sourches =

Historical house in Pays de la Loire, France

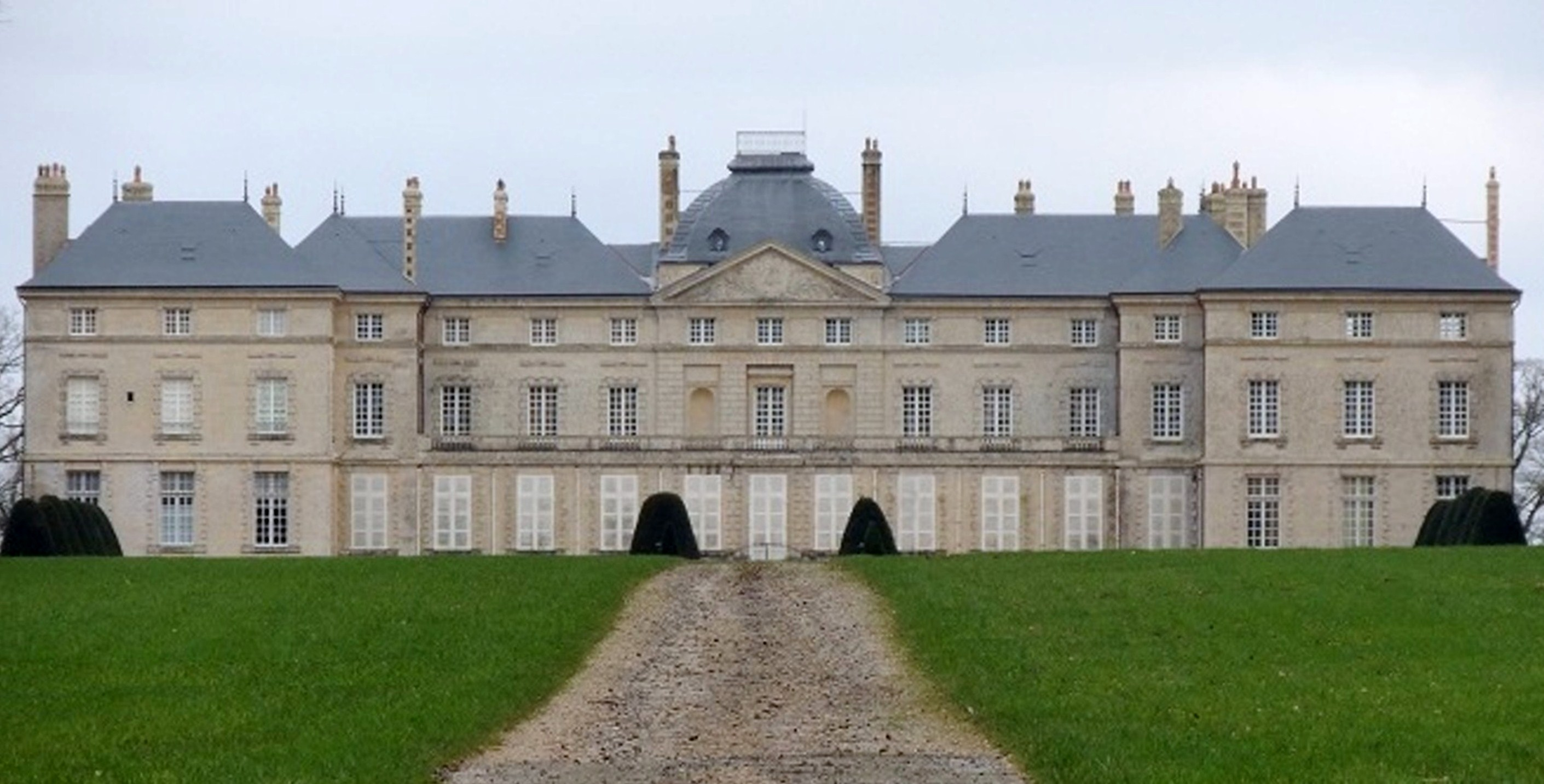
- Château de Sourches, February 2016

- Location within France
- 48°02′43″N 0°03′39″E
- Location: Saint-Symphorien, Sarthe, France

History
- Built: 1761–1786
- Built for: Louis II du Bouchet de Sourches

Site notes
- Architect(s): Gabriel de Lestrade; Jean-François Pradel
- Architectural style: Neoclassical
- Website: chateaudesourches.com

Monument historique
- Designated: 1947

The Château de Sourches is neoclassical château located in the commune of Saint-Symphorien, near Le Mans, in the Sarthe department in the region of Pays de la Loire, in northwestern France.

The château was built between 1761 and 1786 for Louis II du Bouchet de Sourches, Marquis de Sourches, by the King's architect Gabriel de Lestrade with the help of the architect Jean-François Pradrel. It was inherited by Sourches' daughter-in-law, Louise-Élisabeth de Croÿ, Marquise de Tourzel (and future Duchess of Tourzel), Governess of the Children of France from July 1789, who took part in the flight to Varennes and was imprisoned at the Square du Temple with the royal family in August 1792 during the French Revolution. The château passed to the Pérusse des Cars family in 1845 who owned it until 1985.

The roof and façade of the château, as well as its main courtyard, moat and chapel have been classified as historical monuments since 11 April 1947.

== History ==
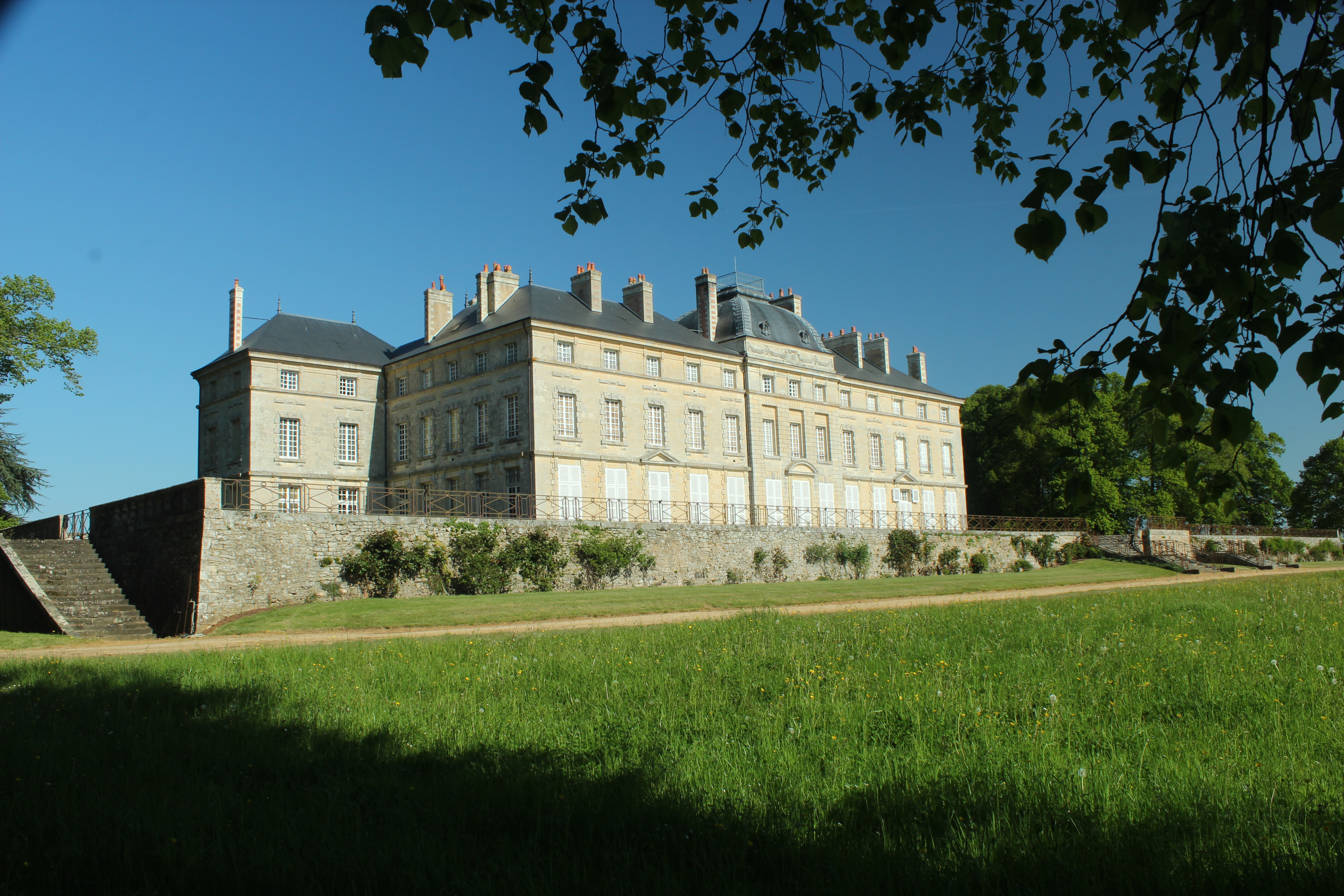
Château de Sourches, April 2017

In 1756, Louis II of Bouchet de Sourches (1711–1788), Marquis de Sourches, Comte de Montsoreau, Grand Prévôt de France, Prévôt de l'hôtel du Roi, worked with architect Gabriel de Lestrade, to construct a new château at Saint-Symphorien, built on the site of an older château which had likely been occupied since Roman Gaul times. Lestrade was a collaborator of the King's architect, Ange-Jacques Gabriel, who had already worked for the Bouchet de Sourches family at the Château du Jonchet in Romilly-sur-Aigre in Eure-et-Loir (later owned by Comte Hubert de Givenchy). Construction of the neoclassical-style château was overseen by Jean-François Pradrel, a prominent architect from Le Mans. As Pradrel was the only one mentioned in the 1761 estimate, so he is sometimes incorrectly referred to as the designer.

After the death of the Marquis de Sourches in 1788, the château passed to his daughter-in-law, Louise-Élisabeth de Croÿ, Marquise de Tourzel (and future Duchess of Tourzel), the Governess of the Children of France from 1789 to 1792 who was widowed two years earlier in 1786. After her 1766 marriage to the Marquis' eldest son, Louis-François du Bouchet de Sourches, Marquis de Tourzel, (Note: Louis-François du Bouchet de Sourches (1744–1786), the Marquis de Sourches' eldest son, used the courtesy title of Marquis de Tourzel, as did Louis-François' wife, Louise-Élisabeth de Croÿ de Tourzel, who was later made Duchess of Tourzel in 1816 by King Charles X. Louise-Élisabeth was the daughter of Duke Louis Ferdinand Joseph de Croÿ of Havré and the Princess Marie Louise Cunégonde de Montmorency-Luxembourg.) and until the French Revolution, Louise-Élisabeth lived between their residence in Paris and the Chateau de Sourches, usually residing, however, at Château d'Abondant at Abondant, in Eure-et-Loir. After the de Tourzel branch died out in 1845, both châteaus passed to the Pérusse des Cars family.

=== 20th Century ===
During the German occupation of France during World War II from 1940 to 1945, the large cellars of the castle were used by the French State to shelter a number of large paintings from the Louvre, some furniture from the Palace of Versailles, the Bayeux Tapestry, and several important private collections belonging to Jewish families, including the Wildenstein and David-Weill families.

In 1956, Louis Charles Marie de Pérusse des Cars (1909–1961), 6th Duke of Cars, put the estate at the disposal of the Sanders company (which had been founded by Belgian chemist Louis Sanders in 1910), of which the Duke was Chairman and CEO, who used it as an animal nutrition research center. In 1957, the center included a dairy station with 50 Normande cows, and by 1960, the size of the research station increased from 140-hectare (350-acre) to 200-hectare (490-acre). In 1998, Sanders was acquired by the André Glon Group, and the Sourches Research Center became the property of the subsequent Glon Sanders group (which became the Glon Group in 2003 and was fully acquired by the Avril Group in 2012). The château and park remained intact and occupied by the Pérusse des Cars family until 1985.

In 1985, however, the château was one of nine estates acquired by the Japanese heiress, Kiko Nakahara, and her Marseillais-born French-American husband, using the name of her family's company Nippon Sangyo Kabushiki Kaisha, as a commercial asset, along with Château de Louveciennes, Château de Rosny-sur-Seine, Château de Millemont, among others. This company caused a scandal by leaving these castles abandoned and, in some cases, stripping them of their furniture and their historic decorations.

=== 21st Century ===
In 2001, the château was bought by Hélène Martin and family, after which the château and the park were immediately reopened to the public. Major restoration work was undertaken with the help of the State, the Region and the Department. Many cultural and sporting events are organized there permanently, hunting festival, the first Sunday in July, agricultural shows, theater, cinema, concert, conferences.

== In popular culture ==
In 2013, the château was the location for the filming of the Francofonia, which was directed by Russian filmmaker Alexandre Sokourov, screened at the 72nd Venice International Film Festival and the 2015 Toronto International Film Festival. The film focuses on the Louvre's status during World War II.

In August and September 2017, filmmaker Emmanuel Mouret shot his ninth film, Mademoiselle de Joncquières (also known as Lady J), which was released in September 2018 featuring Cécile de France, Édouard Baer and Alice Isaaz. The film was an adaptation of the tale Mme de La Pommeraye, a story in Denis Diderot's novel Jacques the Fatalist.
