= Love Affair(s) =

2020 French drama film directed by Emmanuel Mouret

- Film poster
- French: Les Choses qu'on dit, les choses qu'on fait
- Directed by: Emmanuel Mouret
- Written by: Emmanuel Mouret
- Produced by: Frédéric Niedermayer
- Starring: Camelia Jordana; Niels Schneider; Vincent Macaigne; Émilie Dequenne; Jenna Thiam; Guillaume Gouix
- Cinematography: Laurent Desmet
- Edited by: Martial Salomon
- Music by: various composers
- Production company: Moby Dick Films
- Release date: September 16, 2020 (France)
- Running time: 118 minutes
- Country: France
- Language: French
- Box office: $2.5 million

Love Affair(s) (Original title, French: Les Choses qu'on dit, les choses qu'on fait, lit. 'The things we say, the things we do') is a 2020 French drama film written and directed by Emmanuel Mouret. The film stars Camelia Jordana, Niels Schneider, Vincent Macaigne and Julia Piaton.

The film was an official selection for the Cannes Film Festival in 2020 and received 13 nominations for the 46th César Awards, the most of any eligible film.

== Plot ==
While on a rural vacation with his partner, Daphné, who is three months pregnant, François is forced to return to Paris for work. She finds herself on her own when Maxime, a cousin she has never met arrives to stay. For four days, while awaiting François' return, Daphné and Maxime gradually confide to each other their present and past love stories.

Maxime, who is trying to become a novelist, recounts his encounter with Victoire, who was attracted to him. After a brief intimate relationship, she revealed to him that she was married and moving to Japan with her husband. At their farewell party, she introduced Maxime to her sister Sandra, who was in fact his childhood sweetheart, but Sandra had broken off. Maxime’s room-mate Gaspard then came together with Sandra, and they invited Maxime to live with them in the large apartment of Sandra’s aunt. The relationship between Sandra and Gaspard had ups and downs which gave Maxime hope but when he discovered that Gaspard and Sandra still met secretly, he moved out. Daphné tells how she met François; an older documentary filmmaker, for whom she worked as an editor but who did not reciprocate her love.

After sharing their experiences, Daphné and Maxime run into Victoire on one of their walks. She has separated from her husband in Japan, is three months pregnant and staying nearby with her mother. The fact that Maxime visits her at her mother's house, even staying overnight, does not worry Daphné.

In Paris, François learns that his ex-wife Louise has found out about his relationship with Daphné. Daphné and Maxime have begun an affair by the time François arrives back in the country early one morning and confesses his confused feelings to Maxime, but decides to simply remain with Daphné, although no longer sure of his feelings. Maxime does not succeed in keeping with Daphné and leaves by train back to Paris.

Months later, Daphné unexpectedly sees Maxime shopping for Christmas trees in Paris. But she then notices that he is with Victoire, and she turns back to François.

== Cast ==
- Camelia Jordana as Daphné
- Niels Schneider as Maxime
- Vincent Macaigne as François
- Émilie Dequenne as Louise
- Jenna Thiam as Sandra
- Guillaume Gouix as Gaspard
- Julia Piaton as Victoire
- Louis-Do de Lencquesaing as the director
- Jean-Baptiste Anoumon as Stéphane
- Claude Pommereau as the philosopher

== Production ==
Principal filming took place from 29 October to 5 December 2019, mainly in the Île-de-France and the Vaucluse, including the Chateau du Barroux, Vaison-la-Romaine and its hilltop Cathédrale Notre-Dame de Nazareth de Vaison, Crillon-le-Brave, the Avignon-Centre rail station, and Mollans-sur-Ouvèze. The director of photography was Laurent Desmet, who had already worked with Mouret since 2006 on Un baiser s'il vous plaît, Fais-moi plaisir!, L'Art d'aimer, Une autre vie and Mademoiselle de Joncquières.

== Reception ==
=== Box office ===
The film was released in France on September 16, 2020 in 294 theaters, with 11,144 admissions on its first day. The first weekend saw 55,695 admissions. After a week, the film had accumulated 77,092 admissions. Despite 66 additional screens, the second weekend was marked by a 24.5% drop in admissions with 58,182 additional spectators. In January 2021, 279,094 admissions were recorded.

== Music ==
The final credits list a wide range of music used as punctuation between the episodes in the film, by, among others Chopin, Mozart, Satie, Debussy, Haydn, Khactaturian, Granados, Offenbach and Tchaikovsky both in the form of piano pieces and arranged for orchestra.

== Release ==
Les Choses qu'on dit, les choses qu'on fait was released on September 16, 2020 in France.

A DVD of the film published by Moby Dick Films in 2020 also included a 2019 short film written and directed by Mouret entitled Le consentement with Olivier Chantreau and Rebecca Marder.
