= Laurent Stocker =

French actor

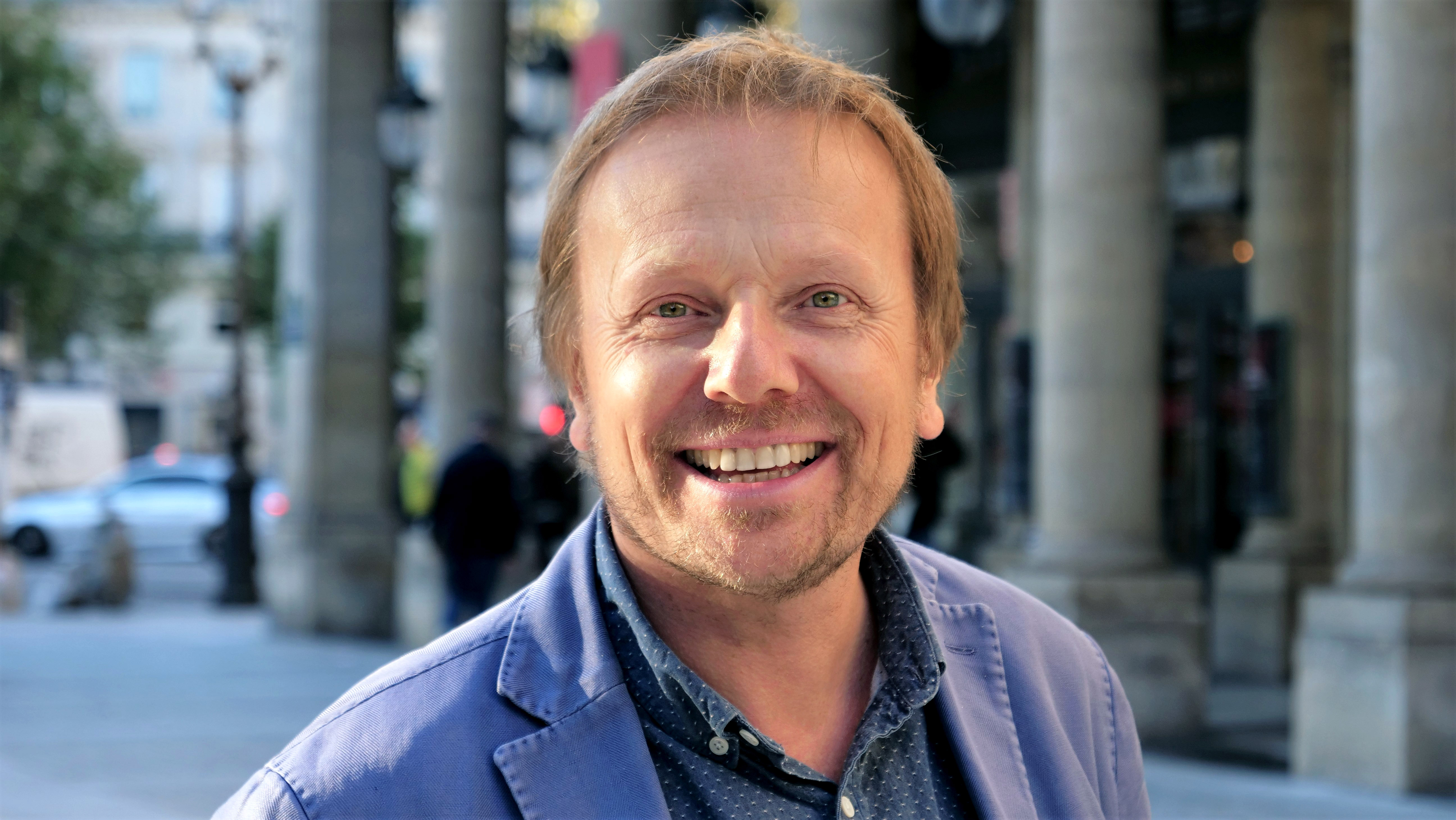
- Born: 27 May 1973 (age 53); Saint-Dizier, France
- Occupation: Actor

Laurent Stocker (born 27 May 1973) is a French theatre and cinema actor, and a sociétaire of the Comédie-Française.

== Life and career ==
He trained at the Ateliers Gérard Philipe and the Conservatoire national supérieur d'art dramatique from 1993 to 1996 in the classes of Madeleine Marion, Daniel Mesguich and Philippe Adrien.

He entered the Comédie-Française on 14 June 2001, where he became the 511th sociétaire on 1 January 2004.

He starred in, among other films, Ensemble, c'est tout by Claude Berri, after the novel of the same name by Anna Gavalda, a role for which he was nominated for the César Award for Most Promising Actor on 22 February 2008. He also starred in Le code a changé by Danièle Thompson with Dany Boon and Karin Viard, and also in Cyprien with Elie Semoun and Catherine Deneuve.

He is also a Chevalier des Arts et Lettres.

== Filmography ==
Cinema

- 2005 : Saint-Jacques… La Mecque by Coline Serreau
- 2005 : Aux abois by Philippe Collin
- 2007 : Miss Oliver a filé à l'anglaise (project) by Claude Zidi
- 2007 : Ensemble, c'est tout by Claude Berri
- 2009 : Change of Plans by Danièle Thompson
- 2009 : Cyprien by David Charhon
- 2009 : Je ne dis pas non by Iliana Lolic
- 2011 : The Art of Love by Emmanuel Mouret
- 2011 : The Minister by Pierre Schoeller (acting Yan)
- 2011 : Nuit Blanche by Frédéric Jardin
- 2014: 1001 Grams
- 2014: Brèves de comptoir by Jean-Michel Ribes
- 2015: Chic! by Jérôme Cornuau
- 2015: Caprice by Emmanuel Mouret
- 2015: Love at First Child by Anne Giafferi
- 2016: Cézanne and I by Danièle Thompson
- 2017: Garde alternée by Alexandra Leclère
- 2018: The Summer House by Valeria Bruni Tedeschi
- 2020: Villa Caprice by Bernard Stora
- 2023: Bernadette
- 2026: Comédie-Française

Television

- 2009 : Un homme d'honneur by Laurent Heynemann
- 2009 : Envoyez la fracture in the Suite noire collection by Claire Devers
- 2010 : Contes et nouvelles du XIXe siècle : L'Écornifleur by Jean-Charles Tacchella
- 2010 : Fracture by Alain Tasma
- 2023 : Bardot by Danièle Thompson and Christopher Thompson

== Theatre ==
- 1992 : Un fil à la patte by Georges Feydeau, directed by Philippe Duclos
- 1996 : La Cour des comédiens by Antoine Vitez, directed by Georges Lavaudant, Festival d'Avignon
- 1996 : Six fois deux, directed by Georges Lavaudant
- 1997 : Histoires de France by Michel Deutsch and Georges Lavaudant, directed by Georges Lavaudant, Théâtre de l'Odéon
- 1997 : Ulysse Matériaux, directed by Georges Lavaudant
- 1999 : Saint Joan of the Stockyards by Bertolt Brecht, directed by Alain Milianti
- 1999 : Victor ou les Enfants au pouvoir by Roger Vitrac, directed by Philippe Adrien
- 1999 : Les Muses orphelines by Michel-Marc Bouchard, directed by Isabelle Ronayette
- 1999 : Henry V by William Shakespeare, directed by Jean-Louis Benoit, Théâtre de l'Aquarium
- 2001 : Le Balcon by Jean Genet, directed by Jean Boillt, Festival d'Avignon
- 2001 : La Fille que j’aime written and directed by Guillaume Hasson
- 2001 : Les Parfums du cheik written and directed by Fawzi Ben Saidi
- 2001 : Cymbeline by William Shakespeare, directed by Mario Gonzalez
- 2001 : Henri VI by William Shakespeare, directed by Nadine Varoutsikos
- 2001 : Lenz, Léonce et Léna, directed by Matthias Langhoff
- 2001 : Henri VI by William Shakespeare, directed by Nadine Varoutsikos
- 2001 : Le Malade imaginaire by Molière, directed by Claude Stratz
- 2001 : Le Bourgeois gentilhomme by Molière, directed by Jean-Louis Benoit
- 2001 : Ruy Blas by Victor Hugo, directed by Brigitte Jaques-Wajeman
- 2001 : Le Dindon by Georges Feydeau, directed by Lukas Hemleb
- 2001 : Fables de La Fontaine by Jean de La Fontaine, directed by Bob Wilson, Comédie-Française
- 2003 : La Forêt by Alexander Ostrovsky, directed by Pyotr Fomenko
- 2008 : Trois Hommes dans un salon by François-René Christiani, directed by Anne Kessler, Studio-Théâtre de la Comédie-Française : Léo Ferré
- 2008 : Juste la fin du monde by Jean-Luc Lagarce, directed by Michel Raskine, Antoine
- 2008 : Le Mariage de Figaro by Beaumarchais, directed by Christophe Rauck : Figaro
- 2009 : Les Précieuses ridicules by Molière, directed by Dan Jemmett, Théâtre du Vieux-Colombier : Jodelet and Du Croisy
- 2009 : Quatre pièces de Georges Feydeau, directed by Gian Manuel Rau, Théâtre du Vieux-Colombier
- 2009 : Amour et Piano : Édouard
- 2009 : Fiancés en herbe : René
- 2009 : Feu la mère de madame : Lucien
- 2010 : Three Sisters (play) by Anton Chekhov, directed by Alain Françon
- 2011 : Three Sisters (play) by Anton Chekhov, directed by Alain Françon

== Awards and nominations ==
- 2008 : Nominated for César Award for Best Supporting Actor for Ensemble, c'est tout
- 2008 : César Award for Most Promising Actor for Ensemble, c'est tout
- 2008 : Nominated for Molière Award for Best Supporting Actor for Juste la fin du monde
