= Léonce de Tarragon =

French ornithologists (1813 -1897)

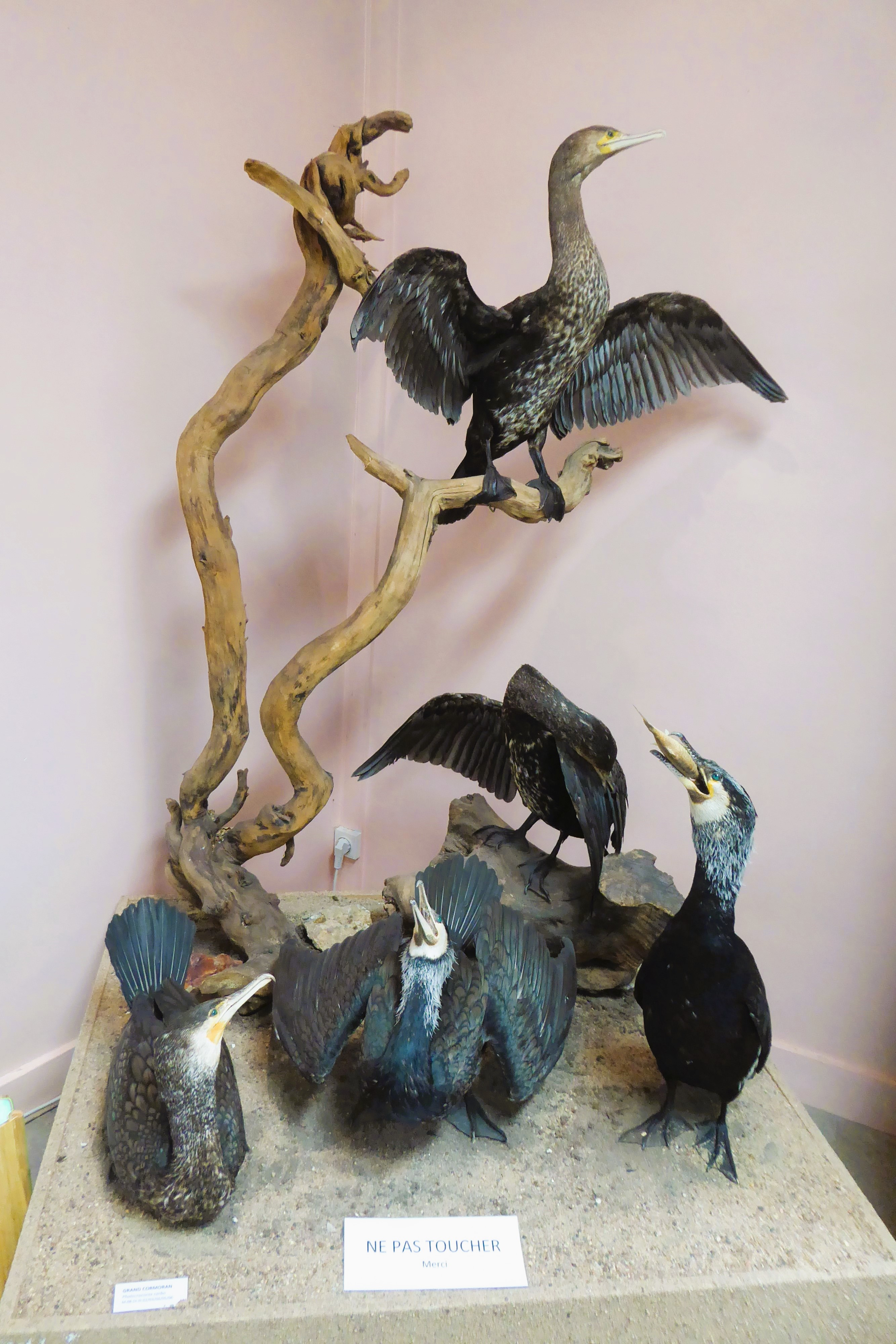
Grand cormoran, musée de Châteaudun, Eure-et-Loir, France.

Louis, Charles, Léonce, marquis de Tarragon (7 November 1813 - 25 January 1897) was a French collector and ornithologist, member of the Société française de numismatique.

== Life ==
Léonce de Tarragon is the son of Armand de Tarragon, owner of the Château du Jonchet, decorated with the Lily in 1814, and of Virginie Goislard de Villebresme.

He bestowed his collection to the city of Châteaudun on January 13, 1897. It includes approximately 2,500 naturalized birds from all over the world. Many exotic species are presented on the first floor of the Museum of Fine Arts and Natural History of Châteaudun.

== Taxa described ==
- Rosy-throated longclaw, 1845
- Red-bellied grackle, 1847
- Dusky indigobird, 1847

== Notes ==
- Annuaire historique et biographique ..., volume 2, partie 5, Direction des archives historiques, 1846
