= Please Please Me (disambiguation) =

Please Please Me is a 1963 album by the Beatles.

Please Please Me may also refer to:

- "Please Please Me" (song), a 1963 song by the Beatles
- "Please Please Me" (Holly Valance song), 2003
- Please, Please Me!, the English title of the 2009 film Fais-moi plaisir!

== See also ==
- Please Me, a 2019 single by Cardi B and Bruno Mars
