= Château du Jonchet =

French renaissance château

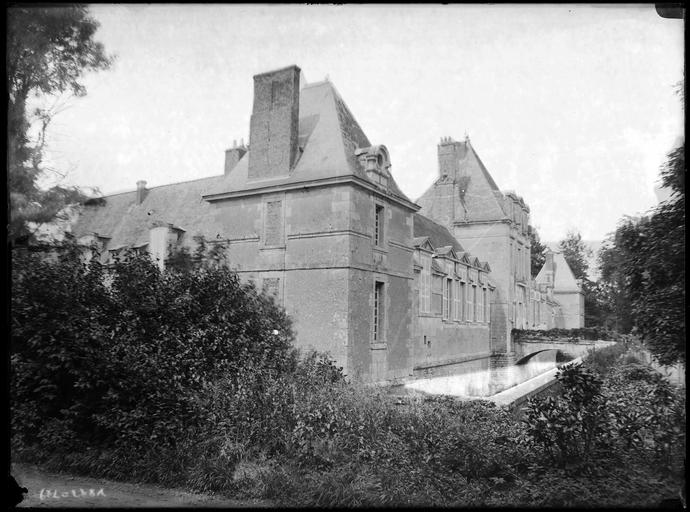
- Château du Jonchet, c. 1900-1920

- Location within France
- 47°59′05″N 1°16′31″E
- Location: Romilly-sur-Aigre, France

Site notes
- Architect: Gabriel de Lestrade
- Architectural style: French Renaissance

Monument historique
- Designated: 1984

The Château du Jonchet (Note: The château is also referred to as "Le Jonchet" or the "Manoir du Jonchet.") is a French Renaissance château located on the banks of the Aigre River in the former commune of Romilly-sur-Aigre (which merged into the new commune of Cloyes-les-Trois-Rivières in 2017) in the Eure-et-Loir department in the region of Centre-Val de Loire, in northern France.

The château was built in the sixteenth century, before being completely transformed by the King's architect Gabriel de Lestrade in the eighteenth century. The château was restored by Fernand Pouillon before it was owned by Roger Bellon and Hubert de Givenchy, who owned the château until his death in 2018.

The château has been designated as a partially protected historical monument since 18 October 1984.

== History ==
The French Renaissance-style château dates from the sixteenth century. In the 18th century, it was transformed by the King's architect Gabriel de Lestrade, who notably built the staircase of Louis-Hilaire du Bouchet, Comte de Sourches. Lestrade, a collaborator of the King's architect, Ange-Jacques Gabriel, later built the Château de Sourches for Louis II du Bouchet de Sourches, Marquis de Sourches, Comte de Montsoreau, Grand Prévôt de France, Prévôt de l'hôtel du Roi.

The château later became the property of Count Lionel de Tarragon (uncle of the sculptor Cyril de La Patellière). Following the end of World War II, the château was badly damaged during the 1950s, but was completely restored by its next owner, the architect Fernand Pouillon. The château then became the property of Roger Bellon, owner of the French pharmaceutical house Laboratoire Roger Bellon, and mayor of Romilly-sur-Aigre. Aristotle Onassis and his partner Maria Callas considered purchasing the château shortly in the early 1960s around the time his divorce was finalized from his first wife Tina.

=== Givenchy years ===
In the early 1970s, the château was acquired by the French couturier Count Hubert de Givenchy (a younger son of Lucien Taffin de Givenchy, Marquis of Givenchy), who owned it with his partner Philippe Venet. When Hubert de Givenchy died in March 2018, Philippe Venet inherited the noble 17th century residence and sold it to Hubert's nephews James and his brother Olivier de Givenchy, shortly before his own death in February 2022.

Under Hubert de Givenchy's ownership, the property featured "labyrinthine boxwood hedges and topiary inspired by the monastery of San Giorgio in Venice, a rose garden designed by the late Bunny Mellon, a greenhouse, an artificial lake, a private chapel, a moat filled with water from the Loir, an indoor pool, and a dog cemetery."

The monument has been classified as a historical monument since 8 October 1984.

== See also ==
- List of châteaux in Eure-et-Loir
