= Frédérique Bel =

French actress

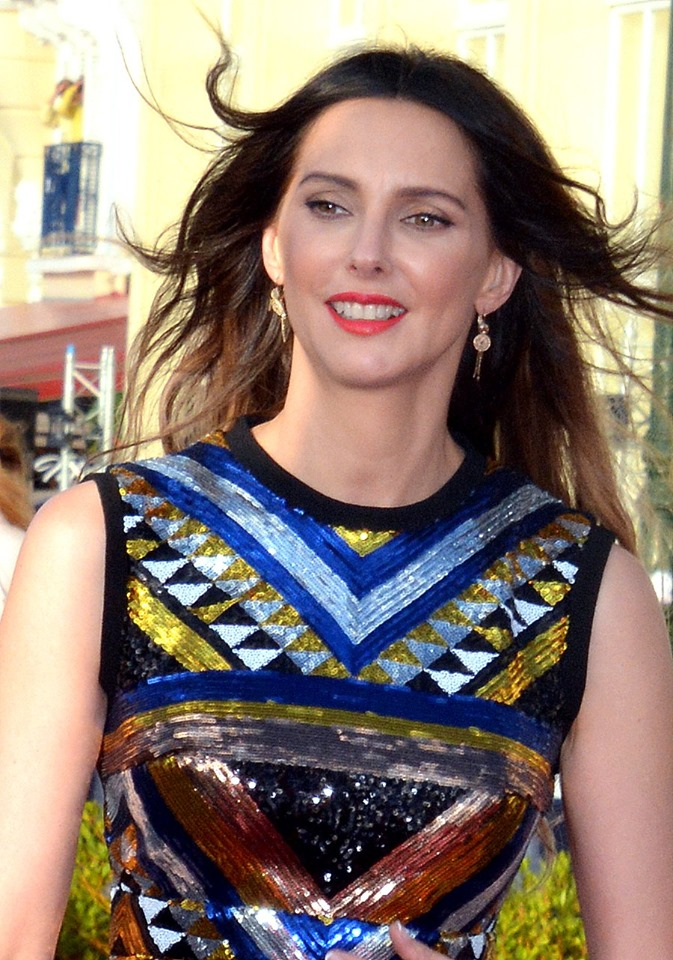
- Bel at the 2019 Cabourg Film Festival
- Born: 24 March 1975 (age 51); Annecy, France
- Occupations: Actress; model
- Years active: 2000–present
- Notable work: Fais pas ci, fais pas ça Serial (Bad) Weddings
- Television: Canal+ (2004–2006)
- Height: 5 ft 9 in (1.75 m)

Frédérique Bel (French: [fʁedeʁik bɛl]; born 24 March 1975) is a French actress and model. A native of Annecy in the French Alps, she became known for her role as Dorothy Doll in the La Minute Blonde sequence from Le Grand Journal on Canal+. She has since played main and supporting roles in many productions.

== Early life and education ==
Frédérique Bel was born in Annecy in the department of Haute-Savoie. After obtaining her baccalauréat, she moved to the region of Alsace where she studied modern literature at the Marc Bloch University of Strasbourg. She then graduated with a master degree and a DEUG in history of arts before joining the University Theater of Strasbourg. She later began a career as a lingerie and body lining model to pay her comedy classes.

== Acting career ==
=== Movie roles ===
Frédérique Bel made her acting debut in 2000 playing a small role in the comedy film Deuxième vie and later in the 2003 comedy film La Beuze. She then had famous supporting roles in comedy and romantic films. These include Tu vas rire, mais je te quitte in 2004, Imposture and The Russian Dolls in 2005. She portrayed Miss France in the 2006 science fiction comedy Un ticket pour l'espace and later featured in the comedy film Camping which had a box office of 5.5 million viewers. The same year, film director Emmanuel Mouret gave her a role in his romantic comedy Change of Address, also featuring himself. She later featured in three other of his films, which are Shall We Kiss? in 2007, Fais-moi plaisir! in 2009, in which she appeared completely naked in one scene, and The Art of Love in 2011.

In 2007, she had supporting roles in comedy films Tel père telle fille and Ma vie n'est pas une comédie romantique. In 2008, she had one of the main roles in the fantastic film Les Dents de la nuit and later that year in the comedy film Vilaine. In 2009, she had a supporting role in comedy film Safari and later in another comedy film La Grande Vie, in addition to the role she had in Fais-moi plaisir! in between. She played in 2010 a small role in the fantastic adventure film The Extraordinary Adventures of Adèle Blanc-Sec directed by Luc Besson. She portrayed the main role in the 2011 thriller Red Nights where she played in Hong Kong the role of Catherine Trinquier, an inspired role of a woman who becomes a criminal. In 2012, she played in the author film L'amour dure trois ans directed by Frédéric Beigbeder, and then had a supporting role in the popular comedy Les Seigneurs directed by Olivier Dahan.

In 2013, she played one of the main roles in the romantic comedy Hôtel Normandy, filmed in the prestigious hotel Normandy Barrière located in the town of Deauville. In 2014, she portrayed one of the main characters in the comedy film Serial (Bad) Weddings with Christian Clavier and Chantal Lauby. The film was a huge success with a box office of over 200,000 viewers on its release date. She then featured the same year in the comedy-drama La Liste de mes envies, which was released soon after and is an adaptation from the novel of the same title, released in 2012.

=== Television roles ===
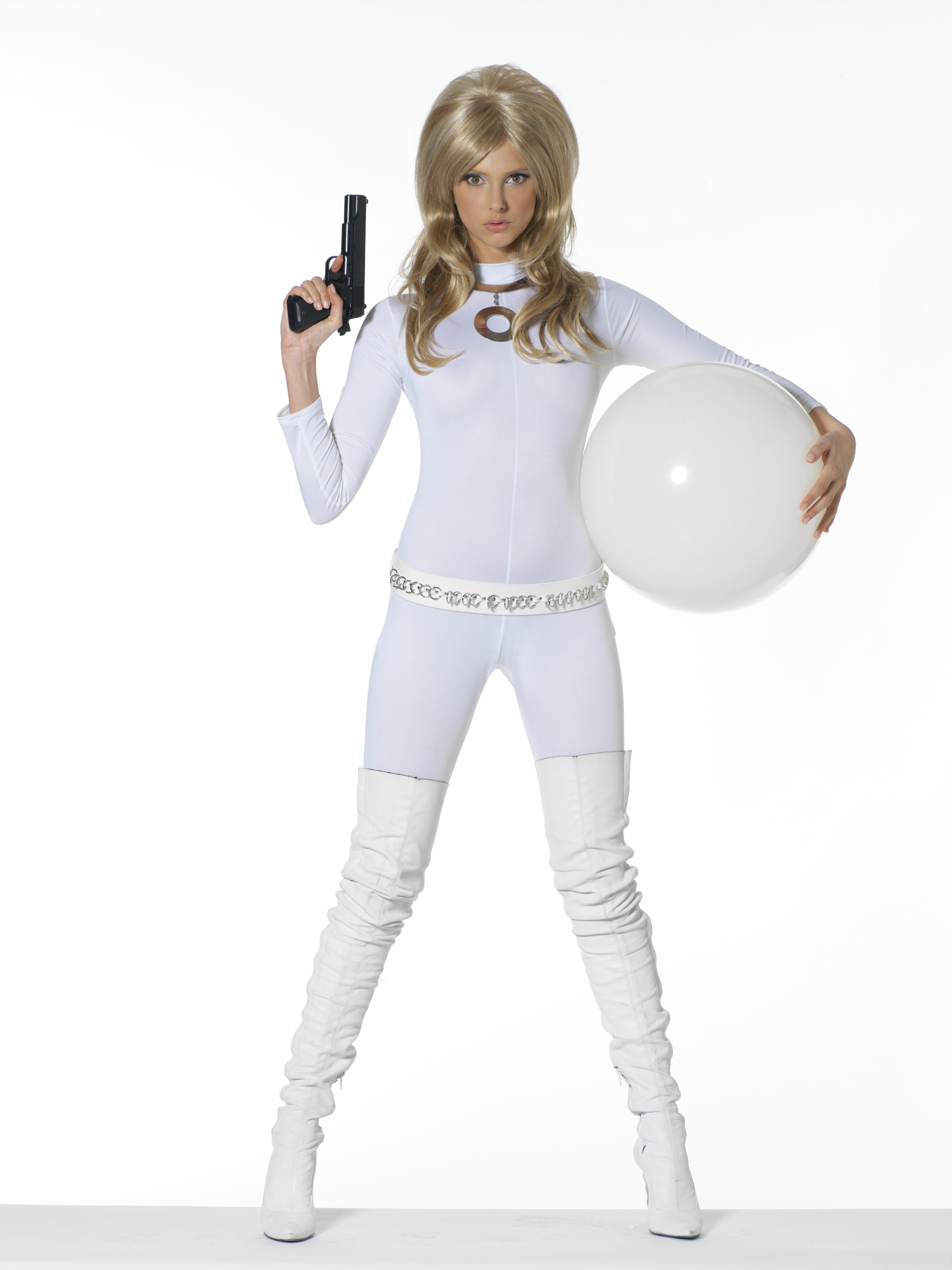
Frédérique Bel portraying her character of Dorothy Doll from La Minute Blonde.

Frédérique Bel began her career on television in 2001 playing a supporting role in the French sitcom Le Groupe which features stories about a group of students and their misadventures. She then rose to fame for creating and portraying the humoristic character of Dorothy Doll, in the sequence titled La Minute Blonde, where she portrays a blond stereotype talking to a celebrity made of cardboard. The sequence was included in Le Grand Journal on Canal+ hosted by Michel Denisot during the first and second season from September 2004 to June 2006.

Frédérique Bel has also played in television films such as the 2006 mini-series Petits meurtres en famille, and later in the 2012 crime series Profilage, where she portrays a manipulating lawyer until the end of the third season. To give the impression of a manipulating character, she even had to lower the tone of her voice to play the role. She had in between a supporting role in the sixth season of the historical fantasy series Kaamelott, where she portrayed Caesar's servant. She later had a regular role from 2011 to 2013 in the comedy series Fais pas ci, fais pas ça from the fourth to the sixth season. She also had a guest role in specials of television series Scènes de ménages in 2013 and Nos chers voisins in 2014. She played as Virginie Delome in the Netflix Original Series La Mante in 2017.

=== Voice roles ===
Frédérique Bel started a career as a voice actress in 2007. Her shrill and particular voice, similar to a doll, gave her the opportunity to voice gentle female characters. She has since voiced in a number of animated films and series in both original and French versions. She began the same year in the third season of Canadian science fiction animated series Tripping the Rift, where she voiced the main character Six in the French version.

She then voiced Rose, the mother of Arthur, in the original versions of animated adventure films Arthur and the Revenge of Maltazard in 2009 and Arthur 3: The War of the Two Worlds in 2010, both directed by Luc Besson. In 2010, she voiced Barbie in the French version of Toy Story 3 and the same character the following year in Hawaiian Vacation, the first short film of the Toy Story Toons series.

== Advertisement ==
From 2001 to 2004, Frédérique Bel appeared in several television advertisements for various brands like Bouygues of Étienne Chatiliez, Darty of Yvan Attal, EDF of Jean-Pierre Jeunet, and also Mir Laine of Philippe Lioret where she portrayed the fairy. She later appeared in an advertisement for the optical brand Krys with other celebrities, including Alain Delon, Jane Birkin, Michel Blanc and Frédéric Beigbeder.

== Activism ==
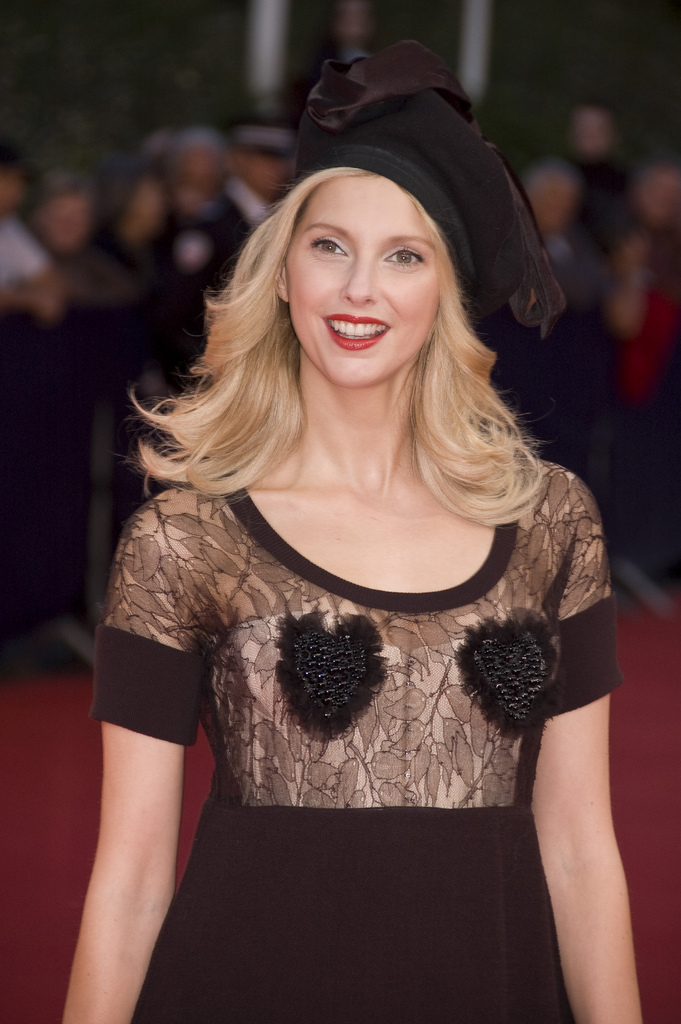
Frédérique Bel at the Deauville American Film Festival in 2009.

Frédérique Bel is the spokesperson of the foundation AMFE (Association Maladies Foie Enfants) that she supports since its creation. She created with her team a national campaign of prevention from liver disease of young children. She portrayed again for that occasion her character of Dorothy Doll from La Minute Blonde.

She is also an avid supporter and defender of women's rights all around the world, a cause that she has often expressed in the media and on the social networks. She posted on her Twitter account a picture of her naked to defend the right for the IVG (Interruption Volontaire de Grossesse, the French equivalent for abortion).

== Controversies ==
Frédérique Bel has posted pictures and comments via social networks which caused a lot of controversy. In 2012 on her official Twitter account, while supporting François Hollande during the 2012 French presidential election, she was suspended after having posted pictures of her naked, only two days after having created her account. Her suspension was over three days later and she was allowed to post again on her account.

In November 2014, her Facebook account was blocked for seven days for the head comment she posted on two articles she shared about trafficking of women in the Islamic State. She then used her Twitter account to express her anger of being censored by Facebook. She also added in an attached link the message she wrote them stating that she defends women's rights in the world and that she was angry for being blocked.

== Filmography ==
Year	Title	Role	Director	Notes
2000	Deuxième vie	Friend of Vincent's father	Patrick Braoudé	
2003	Laisse tes mains sur mes hanches	Girl Pulpo	Chantal Lauby	
2003	La Beuze	Advertising's girl	François Desagnat, Thomas Sorriaux	
2003	Il était une fois Jean-Sébastien Bach	Maria Barbara Bach	Jean-Louis Guillermou	
2003	France Boutique	Beautiful girl	Tonie Marshall	
2004	A Very Long Engagement	A prostitute	Jean-Pierre Jeunet	
2004	L'incruste	Céline's friend	Alexandre Castagnetti, Corentin Julius	
2004	La méthode anglaise	The nurse	Sarah Lévy	Short
2004	Léa Parker	The Blond	Jean-Pierre Prévost	TV series (1 episode)
2004–06	Le Grand Journal	Dorothy Doll	Various	TV short
2005	Russian Dolls	Barbara	Cédric Klapisch	
2005	Tu vas rire, mais je te quitte	Vanessa	Philippe Harel	
2005	Imposture	Braces Student	Patrick Bouchitey	
2006	Un ticket pour l'espace	Miss France	Eric Lartigau	
2006	Camping	Christy Bergougnoux	Fabien Onteniente	
2006	Changement d'adresse	Anne	Emmanuel Mouret	Nominated - Étoiles d'Or - Best Female Newcomer
2006	Petits meurtres en famille	Madeleine	Edwin Baily	TV mini-series
2007	Shall We Kiss?	Câline	Emmanuel Mouret	
2007	Tel père telle fille	Catherine	Olivier De Plas	
2007	Ma vie n'est pas une comédie romantique	The secretary	Marc Gibaja	
2007	La plus belle fille du monde	The girl	Stephane Couston	Short
2007	Un autre monde	The girl	David Haddad	Short
2007	Tripping the Rift	Six (voice)	Bernie Denk	TV series (13 episodes)
2008	Vilaine	Aurore Cahier	Jean-Patrick Benes, Allan Mauduit	
2008	Mes stars et moi	Makeup Artist	Laetitia Colombani	
2008	Les dents de la nuit	Alice Wouhou	Stephen Cafiero, Vincent Lobelle	
2008	Drôle de Noël!	Véronique	Nicolas Picard	TV movie
2008	Temps Mort	Irene	James L. Frachon	TV mini-series
2009	Lascars	Manuella Lardu (voice)	Emmanuel Klotz, Albert Pereira-Lazaro	
2009	Fais-moi plaisir!	Ariane	Emmanuel Mouret	
2009	Arthur and the Revenge of Maltazard	Rose (voice)	Luc Besson	
2009	Safari	Fabienne	Olivier Baroux	
2009	La grande vie	Odile	Emmanuel Salinger	
2009	Une place à prendre	Bus's girl	Charles Meurisse	Short
2009	Sous le fard	Anne-Laure	Maud Ferrari	Short
2009	Kaamelott	Helvia	Alexandre Astier	TV series (4 episodes)
2010	The Extraordinary Adventures of Adèle Blanc-Sec	The Bourgeois	Luc Besson	
2010	Arthur 3: The War of the Two Worlds	Rose (voice)	Luc Besson	
2010	Red Nights	Catherine Trinquier	Julien Carbor, Laurent Courtiaud	
2010	Toy Story 3	Barbie (voice)	Lee Unkrich	
2010	Entre nous deux	Christine	Nicolas Guillou	
2010	Cinémaniac	Veronique	Jousse Alexandre	Short
2010	Je pourrais être votre grand-mère	The neighbor	Bernard Tanguy	Short
2010	Bloody Christmas 2: La révolte des sapins	Isabelle Morin	Michel Leray	Short
2011	The Art of Love	Achille's neighbor	Emmanuel Mouret	
2011	Beur sur la ville	The Blond	Djamel Bensalah	
2011	L'amour dure trois ans	Kathy	Frédéric Beigbeder	
2011	Hawaiian Vacation	Barbie (voice)	Gary Rydstrom	
2011	Au bistro du coin	Fanny	Charles Nemes	
2011	Il faut qu'on parle...	Fred	Raphaël Kenzey	Short
2011	L'âme du mal	Iris	Jérôme Foulon	TV movie
2011–13	Fais pas ci, fais pas ça	Tatiana Lenoir	Various	TV series (14 episodes)
2012	Les seigneurs	Floria	Olivier Dahan	
2012	Profilage	Barbara Cluzel	Julien Despaux, Alexandre Laurent	TV series (5 episodes)
2013	Hôtel Normandy	Isabelle de Castlejane	Charles Nemes	
2013	Igor Tututson ou l'incroyable histoire d'un homme ordinaire	Amandine	Nils De Coster	Short
2014	Serial (Bad) Weddings	Isabelle Verneuil	Philippe de Chauveron	
2014	La liste de mes envies	Danielle	Didier Le Pêcheur	
2014	Scènes de ménages	Pénélope	Francis Duquet	TV series (1 episode)
2014	Métal Hurlant Chronicles	Laerana	Guillaume Lubrano	TV series (1 episode)
2015	Arnaud fait son 2e film	Meetic girl	Arnaud Viard	
2015	The Student and Mister Henri	Valérie Voizot	Ivan Calbérac	
2015	Le chapeau de Mitterrand	Fanny Marquant	Robin Davis	TV movie
2015	Doc Martin	Catherine de Pougeac	Rodolphe Chauvin, Stéphane Kappes	TV series (1 episode)
2016	The Visitors: Bastille Day	Flore	Jean-Marie Poiré	
2016	Cédric	Mademoiselle Nelly	Gabriel Julien-Laferrière	
2017	Sales Gosses	Sophie Bonheur	Frédéric Quiring	
2017	Crash Test Aglaé	Lola	Éric Gravel	
2017	La Mante	Virginie Delome	Alexandre Laurent	Netflix Original Series
2018	Making Love	Woman	Helen Rollins	Short
2019	Serial (Bad) Weddings 2	Isabelle Verneuil	Philippe de Chauveron	
2019	Ibiza	Fleur	Arnaud Lemort	
2020	Ducobu 3	Adeline Gratin	Élie Semoun	UGC
2020	H24	Florence		TV movie
2020	Divorce Club	Sarah	Michaël Youn	SND
