= Frédéric Épaud =

French actor

- Born: 12 May 1970 (age 54); Les Sables-d'Olonne, France
- Occupation: Actor
- Years active: 2004–present

Frédéric Épaud (born 12 May 1970) is a French actor. He was born in Les Sables-d'Olonne.

== Filmography ==
- Kings and Queen (dir. Arnaud Desplechin, 2004).
- Les Fragments d'Antonin (dir. Gabriel Le Bomin, 2006).
- Tel père telle fille (dir. Olivier de Plas, 2007).
- L'Auberge rouge (dir. Gérard Krawczyk, 2007).
- Les Yeux bandés (dir. Thomas Lilti, 2007).
- Coluche, l'histoire d'un mec (dir. Antoine de Caunes, 2008).
- Go Fast (dir. Olivier Van Hoofstadt, 2008).
- Fais-moi plaisir! (dir. Emmanuel Mouret. 2009).
- The Last Flight (dir. Karim Dridi, 2009).
- La Sainte Victoire, (dir. François Favrat, 2009).
- Accomplices (dir. Frédéric Mermoud, 2009).
- Le Paradis des bêtes (dir. Estelle Larrivaz, 2012).
- Superstar (dir. Xavier Giannoli, 2012).
- Une Estonienne à Paris (dir. Ilmar Raag, 2012).
- Vive la France (dir. Michaël Youn. 2013).
- Jappeloup (dir. Christian Duguay, 2013).
- Taj Mahal (dir. Nicolas Saada, 2015).
- Belle & Sebastian: The Adventure Continues (dir. Christian Duguay, 2015).
- Un sac de billes (dir. Christian Duguay, 2017).
