= Louis II du Bouchet de Sourches =

French nobleman and Grand Provost of France

Louis du Bouchet de Sourches
- Marquis of Sourches
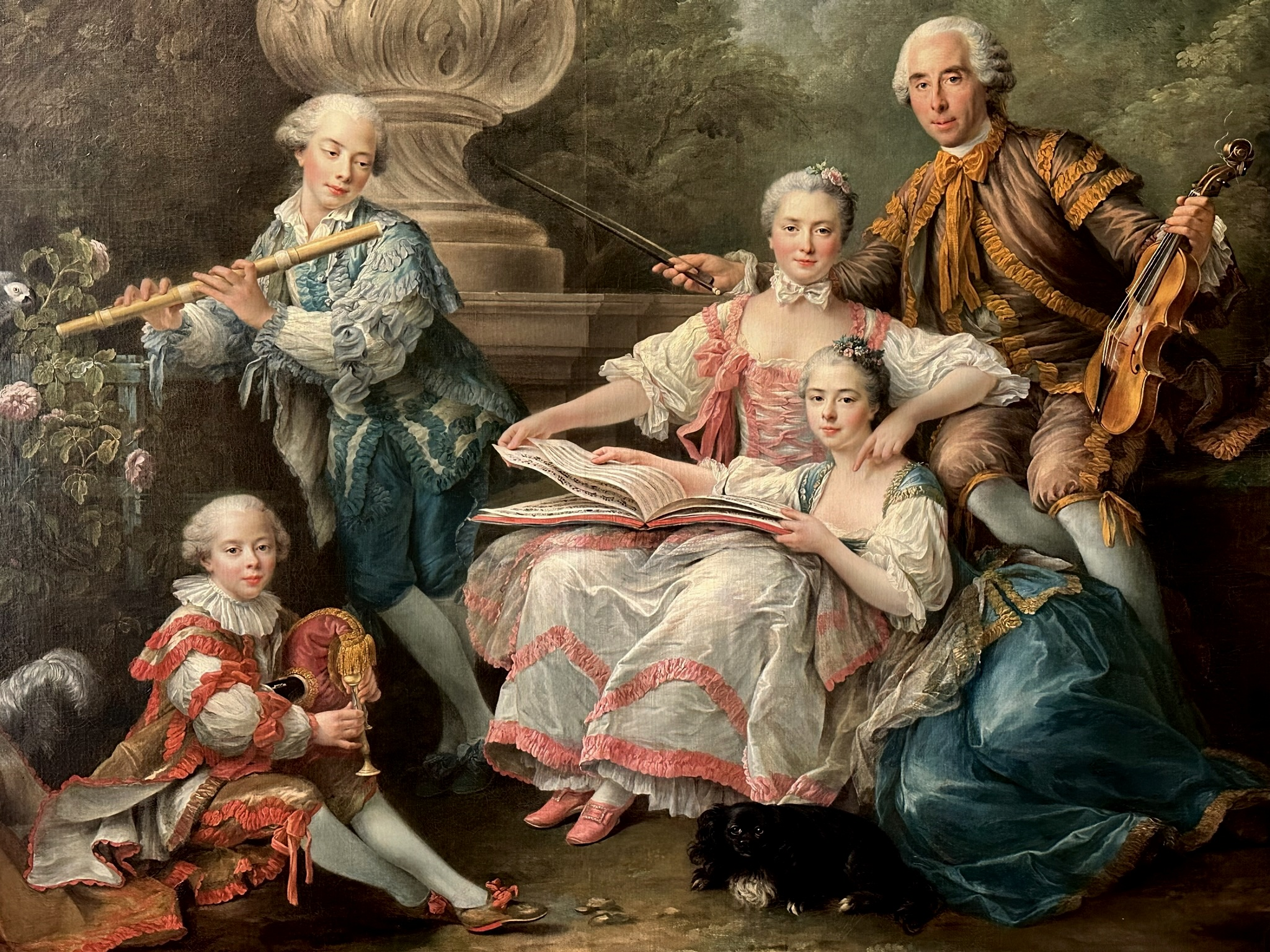
- François-Hubert Drouais, Le marquis de Sourches et sa famille, 1756. Château de Versailles.
- Born: 25 November 1711
- Died: 9 April 1788 (aged 76)
- Father: Louis I du Bouchet de Sourches
- Mother: Jeanne Agnès Thérèse Pocholles du Hamel
- Occupation: Grand Provost of France

Louis II du Bouchet de Sourches, Marquis of Sourches (25 November 1711 – 9 April 1788) was a French nobleman, soldier and senior courtier.

== Biography ==
Sourches was the only son of Louis I du Bouchet de Sourches, Marquis of Sourches (1666–1746) and Jeanne Agnès Thérèse Pocholles du Hamel. From 1719, when aged only eight years old, he received the reversion of the office of Grand Provost of France, and assumed the role fully upon his father's death in 1746. In this capacity Sourches was head of the court police and had jurisdiction over the Maison Militaire du Roi de France under Louis XV. He was a lieutenant general of the king's armies and on 1 January 1773 he was made a knight of the Order of the Holy Spirit. He was also a knight of the Order of Saint Michael. He retained the role of Grand Provost upon the accession of Louis XVI in 1774. He served in the French army during the American Revolutionary War.

Between 1747 and 1750, he had Château d'Abondant in Abondant transformed and redecorated in the Rocaille style, employing the Parisian architect Jean Mansart de Jouy. From 1763 to 1786 he had the Château de Sourches in Saint-Symphorien, Sarthe rebuilt in the neoclassical style, by the king's architect Gabriel de Lestrade.

=== Marriages and children ===
On February 13, 1730, he married Charlotte Antoinette de Gontaut-Biron (1711–1740), daughter of Charles Armand de Gontaut, Marquis then Duke of Biron. The couple had four daughters.

After Charlotte's death, Sourches married secondly Marguerite Henriette Desmarets de Maillebois (1721–1783), daughter of Jean-Baptiste Desmarest, Marquis de Maillebois, in 1741. She was the granddaughter of Yves d'Alègre.
The marriage produced three sons and one daughter. Their second son, Louis-François (1744-1786), married Louise Élisabeth de Croÿ (1749–1832), Governess of the Children of France.

French nobility
Preceded by Louis I du Bouchet	Marquis of Sourches; 1746–1788	Succeeded by Charles du Bouchet
