= Caprice (2015 film) =

- Film poster
- Directed by: Emmanuel Mouret
- Written by: Emmanuel Mouret
- Produced by: Frédéric Niedermayer
- Starring: Virginie Efira; Anaïs Demoustier; Laurent Stocker; Emmanuel Mouret
- Cinematography: Laurent Desmet
- Edited by: Martial Salomon
- Music by: Giovanni Mirabassi
- Production companies: Moby Dick Films; Arte France Cinéma; TF1 Films Production; Malec Productions
- Distributed by: Pyramide Distribution
- Release date: 22 April 2015
- Running time: 100 minutes
- Country: France
- Language: French
- Budget: $3 million
- Box office: $942.000

Caprice is a 2015 French romantic comedy film written and directed by Emmanuel Mouret, and starring Mouret, Virginie Efira, Anaïs Demoustier and Laurent Stocker. Set in Paris, it follows the misadventures of a young teacher who is in love with a famous stage actress but is himself adored by a vivacious aspirant actress. It won the award for Best Film at the 2015 Cabourg Film Festival.

== Plot ==
Clément, a teacher in a primary school, is divorced and on his own. He shares his worries with his headmaster Thomas, whose wife has left him. In the evenings Clément likes to go to the theatre, and in particular to plays featuring Alicia. Her regal beauty and rare acting ability can reduce him to secret tears, which are noticed by the girl in the next seat, She is Caprice, a cheerful would-be actress who also delivers pizzas.

Thomas gets a request for a sympathetic teacher to tutor a youngster, and offers the job to Clément. It is for Alicia's nephew, who is staying in the elegant house where she lives alone. She comes to appreciate his shy charm and strong rapport with children, while he is already in love with her from her stage performances. Things end with Clément moving in.

Going out for drinks with the lonely Thomas, he and Thomas are chatted up by two girls, who turn out to be Caprice and her flatmate. Things end with Clément leaving Caprice's bed at dawn to sneak back into Alicia's. He is seen by the servant who, to Alicia's alarm, leaves. Clément then admits his lapse and is banished to the spare room. Out drinking with theatre friends, Alicia sees Thomas and, when the bars shut, things end with her taking him into the theatre to raid the manager's drinks cupboard. Both conceal their night together from Clément.

Unwilling to accept that Clément can shut her out of his life after one tender night, Caprice keeps finding reasons to contact him. While Alicia is away on a long tour, he breaks a leg in an accident and Caprice looks after him, despite him refusing to be unfaithful again. When he tells her firmly that he is not going to see her any more, she takes an overdose. Going to the hospital, Clément finds that she has a male friend who will look after her.

Back in Alicia's favour, she takes up a play that he started and Caprice improved, which proves to be a success. The actress and the playwright lead a successful life, and Thomas' wife comes back to him. Nobody knows what's happened to Caprice.

== Cast ==
- Virginie Efira as Alicia
- Anaïs Demoustier as Caprice
- Laurent Stocker as Thomas
- Emmanuel Mouret as Clément
- Michaël Cohen as Le comédien au théâtre
- Thomas Blanchard as Jean
- Mathilde Warnier as Virginie
- Olivier Cruveiller as Maurice
- Botum Dupuis as Christie
- Néo Rouleau as Jacky
- Léo Lorléac'h as Victor

== Reception ==
In France, the film averages 3.5/5 on the AlloCiné from 29 press reviews.
