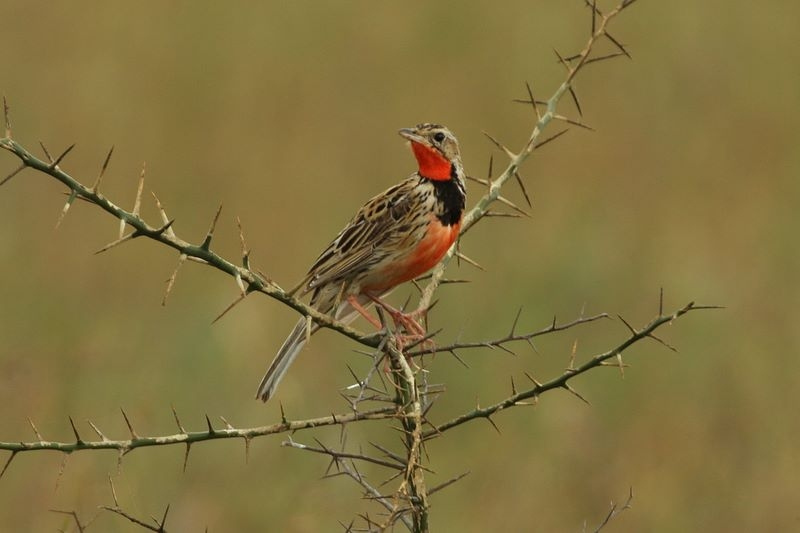
- In East Africa

Conservation status
- Least Concern (IUCN 3.1)

Scientific classification
- Kingdom: Animalia
- Phylum: Chordata
- Class: Aves
- Order: Passeriformes
- Family: Motacillidae
- Genus: Macronyx
- Species: M. ameliae

Binomial name
- Macronyx ameliae de Tarragon, 1845

Synonyms
- Macronyx wintoni, Sharpe

= Rosy-throated longclaw =

Species of bird

The rosy-throated longclaw, also known as the rosy-breasted longclaw (Macronyx ameliae) is a species of bird in the family Motacillidae. It is found in Angola, Botswana, Democratic Republic of the Congo, Kenya, Malawi, Mozambique, Namibia, South Africa, Tanzania, Zambia, and Zimbabwe. Its natural habitat is subtropical or tropical seasonally wet or flooded lowland grassland.

The Marquis Léonce de Tarragon described the species in 1845, its specific name honouring either his wife or mother who were both named Amélie. Richard Bowdler Sharpe named this species M. wintoni in 1891 after William Edward de Winton. Common names include rosy-throated longclaw, pink-throated longclaw and rosy-breasted longclaw.

Three subspecies are recognized: M. ameliae ameliae from Mozambique, Eswatini and eastern South Africa, M. ameliae wintoni from southwestern Kenya and northern Tanzania, and M. ameliae altanus from Botswana, Angola, Malawi, southwestern Tanzania, Zimbabwe and Zambia.

== Description ==
Adult birds are 19–20 centimetres (7.5–7.9 in) long with greyish-brown scalloped upper parts. The male has a pink throat and breast crossed with a broad black band across the chest, which is not evident outside of breeding season. Female birds have pink underparts, but lack the black band. Immature birds have mainly black-streaked pale brown underparts with some pink-red colour centrally.

It makes a chiteet call, resembling that of a pipit.

The rosy-throated longclaw is found in wet grasslands and flood plains, often with lower grasses. Found across central and eastern Africa, it is more patchily distributed in the south of the continent. It is restricted to the Okavango Delta, Linyanti Marshes and Chobe floodplains in Botswana and Namibia, the Zimbabwe highveld in Zimbabwe and coastal areas in KwaZulu-Natal.

Its occurrence in KwaZulu-Natal is threatened by coastal development. The rosy-throated longclaw breeds during the wet season from September to April.

== Sources ==
- Beolens, Bo; Watkins, Michael; Grayson, Michael (2014). The Eponym Dictionary of Birds. Bloomsbury Publishing. ISBN 978-1-4729-0574-1.
- Hancock, Peter; Weiersbye, Ingrid (2015). Birds of Botswana. Princeton, NJ: Princeton University Press. ISBN 978-1-4008-7417-0.
- Sinclair, Ian; Davidson, Ian Hugh (1995). Sasol Southern African Birds: A Photographic Guide. Ztruik. ISBN 978-1-77007-244-2.
- Stevenson, Terry; Fanshawe, John (2004). Birds of East Africa: Kenya, Tanzania, Uganda, Rwanda, Burundi. A&C Black. ISBN 978-0-7136-7347-0.
