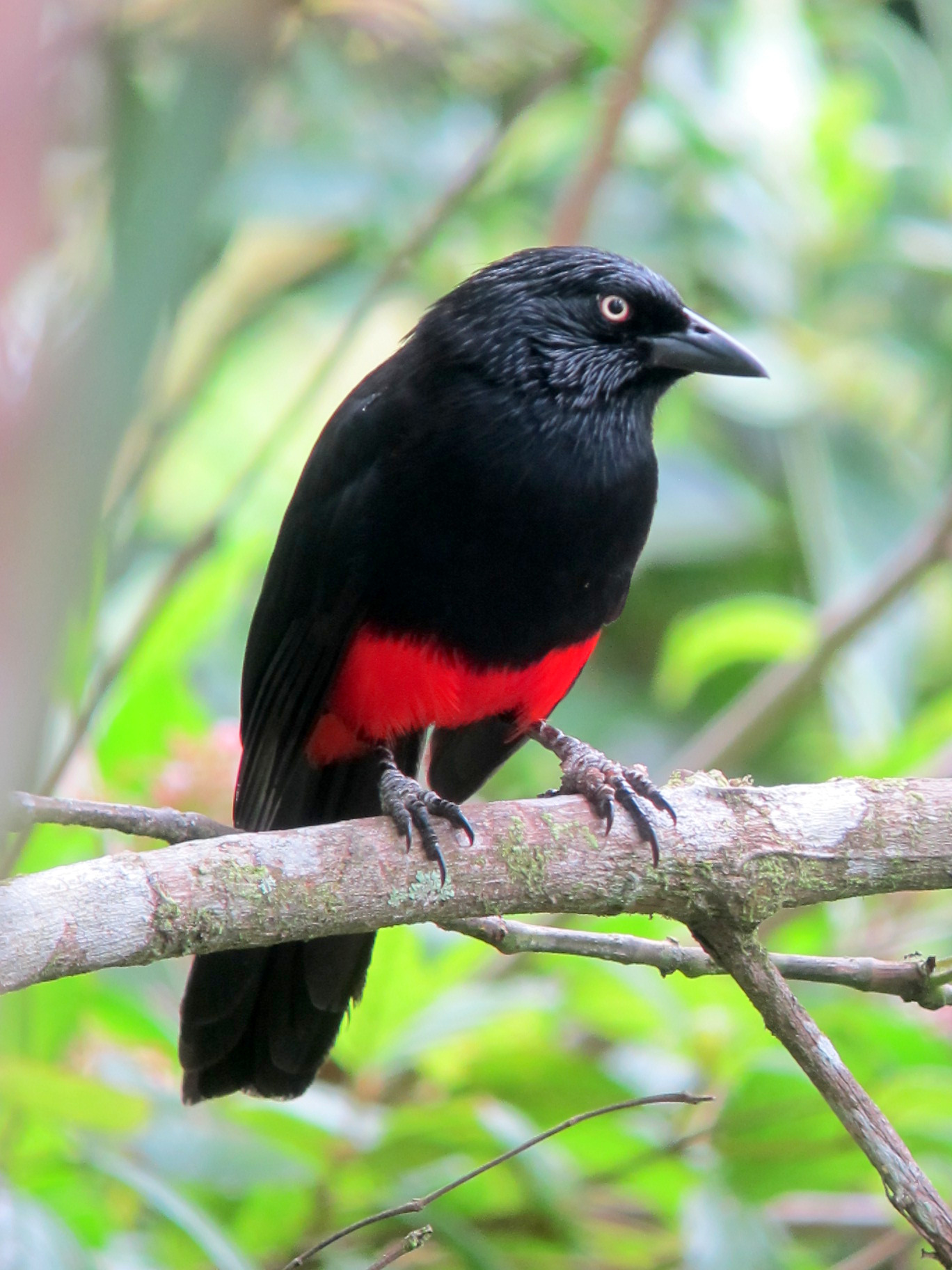
- in Colombia

Conservation status
- Vulnerable (IUCN 3.1)

Scientific classification
- Kingdom: Animalia
- Phylum: Chordata
- Class: Aves
- Order: Passeriformes
- Family: Icteridae
- Genus: Hypopyrrhus; Bonaparte, 1850
- Species: H. pyrohypogaster

Binomial name
- Hypopyrrhus pyrohypogaster (de Tarragon, 1847)

= Red-bellied grackle =

Species of bird

The red-bellied grackle (Hypopyrrhus pyrohypogaster) is a species of bird in the family Icteridae. Its genus, Hypopyrrhus, is monotypic.

One of the grackles, it is endemic to Colombia where its natural habitat is subtropical or tropical moist montane forests. The species is threatened by habitat destruction and the International Union for Conservation of Nature considers it to be a "vulnerable species".

== Description ==
The male red-bellied grackle grows to about 30 cm (12 in) and the female about 27 cm (10.6 in). The sexes are similar in appearance being entirely black apart from a red belly and red under-tail coverts. The bill is conical in shape and the irises are white or yellow. When held in the hand it is possible to see that the feathers of the head, neck and throat have shiny, naked shafts and thick, narrow webs.

== Distribution and habitat ==
The red-bellied grackle is endemic to Colombia where it is found in all three Andean ranges at altitudes of 800 to 2,400 m (2,600 to 7,900 ft) above sea level. Its natural habitat is tropical forest, but the trees are increasingly being felled for timber and to make way for agriculture, and little virgin forest remains within its range. However, it can tolerate some disturbance and can be seen at forest edges, in plantations, on cleared land, in scrub, over pasture and beside roads.

== Behaviour ==
Except during the breeding season, the red-bellied grackle is usually seen in small, noisy groups in the canopy. Sometimes these are mixed flocks with other grackles, and sometimes they may include Oropendolas. The grackles feed on fruit and insects, scrambling about among the branches and foliage, and sometimes clinging upside down. Breeding takes place between March and August. The nest is a cup-shaped structure in the fork of a tree, loosely composed of sticks and dead leaves. The eggs are greenish-grey, blotched and streaked with dark brown and lilac. The giant cowbird (Molothrus oryzivorus) sometimes lays its eggs in the grackle's nest.

== Status ==
H. pyrohypogaster was formerly classified as "endangered" by the International Union for Conservation of Nature but in 2012 the threat level was lowered to "vulnerable". This is on the basis that, although its forest habitat remains under pressure, it has been found at some new locations where it was not known before. The total population is now estimated to be in the range 2,500 to 9,999 individuals, occupying a land area of about 3,700 km^{2} (1,428.6 mi^{2}). The population is believed to be declining due to the continuing decline of the forest cover in the area and the fragmentation of its habitat.
