= Change of Plans =

Change of Plans may refer to:

- Change of Plans (film), a 2009 French film
- Change of Plans (album), a 2026 album by 49 Winchester
- Change of Plans (Chicago Fire), an episode of the TV series Chicago Fire

== See also ==
- Back on My Buck Shit Vol. 2: Change of Plans, a mixtape by Young Buck
