= Lady J =

- Theatrical release poster
- French: Mademoiselle de Joncquières
- Directed by: Emmanuel Mouret
- Written by: Emmanuel Mouret
- Based on: Jacques the Fatalist, a novel by Denis Diderot
- Produced by: Frédéric Niedermayer; Dharam Patwardhan
- Starring: Cécile de France; Édouard Baer; Alice Isaaz
- Cinematography: Laurent Desmet
- Edited by: Martial Salomon
- Production companies: Moby Dick Films; Arte France Cinéma; Reborn Production
- Distributed by: Pyramide Distribution
- Release dates: 7 September 2018 (Toronto); 12 September 2018 (France)
- Running time: 109 minutes
- Country: France
- Language: French
- Box office: $4.1 million

Lady J (French: Mademoiselle de Joncquières) is a 2018 French period drama film written and directed by Emmanuel Mouret, based on a story in Denis Diderot's novel Jacques the Fatalist. Set in the Kingdom of France before 1789, it follows Madame de La Pommeraye (Cécile de France), an attractive widow abandoned by her bachelor lover, the Marquis des Arcis (Édouard Baer).

The film had its world premiere at the Platform section of the 2018 Toronto International Film Festival on 7 September. It was theatrically released in France by Pyramide Distribution on 12 September, and was a box office success.

== Plot ==
Madame de La Pommeraye, a young and pretty widow who boasts that she has never been in love, ends up yielding to the advances of the Marquis des Arcis, a well-known libertine, who is diligently and obsessively courting her. When after two years the Marquis begins to neglect Madame de La Pommeraye, she suggests to him that their feeling for each other has faded. He, instead of denying this, agrees wholeheartedly. Deeply hurt by his rejection, she plots revenge.

She knows of an unfortunate noblewoman and her illegitimate daughter, Mademoiselle de Joncquières, who survive by entertaining men in a nightclub. Moving them into an apartment, she asks them to dress in black like devout Catholics and walk in the park. There she introduces them to the Marquis, who is struck on the spot by the beauty of the girl. Madame de La Pommeraye claims not to know where they live, so he hires detectives and lays siege to the girl. On instructions from Madame de La Pommeraye, she refuses all offers short of marriage.

On the wedding night, the Marquis says he will not take her virginity until she feels ready. The next morning, Madame de La Pommeraye calls to take the bridal pair for a drive. Stopping outside the club, she tells the Marquis that this is where his wife and mother-in-law used to work. In fury and disgust, the Marquis rejects his wife and goes home. There he finds her, saved from the river into which she had thrown herself. The next morning, when she has recovered, he tells her the marriage is over and she is free to go off with whomever she wants.

She asks him to forget the past life into which misfortune had led her and to forgive her part in the cruel trick which Madame de La Pommeraye had played. Her honesty touches his heart, and they are reconciled. Madame de La Pommeraye's friend dares not tell her that the two are now a happy couple.

== Cast ==
- Cécile de France as Madame de La Pommeraye
- Édouard Baer as the Marquis des Arcis
- Alice Isaaz as Mademoiselle de Joncquières
- Natalia Dontcheva as Madame de Joncquières, her mother
- Laure Calamy as Lucienne, friend of Madame de La Pommeraye

== Production ==
Filming took place at the Château de Sourches in Saint-Symphorien (Sarthe).

== Release ==
The film opened in French theaters in September 2018. It also screened at the 2018 Toronto International Film Festival, as part of the Platform program. Netflix obtained rights to stream the film in the US and internationally.

== Reception ==
=== Box office ===
The film grossed $4.1 million at the French box office.

=== Critical response ===
Lady J has an approval rating of 85% on review aggregator website Rotten Tomatoes, based on 13 reviews, and an average rating of 6.8/10. The website's critical consensus states: "Deliciously decadent, Lady J is a surprisingly subversive romance with incredible production values.
