= Taj Mahal (2015 film) =

- Directed by: Nicolas Saada
- Written by: Nicolas Saada
- Produced by: Patrick Sobelman
- Starring: Stacy Martin; Louis-Do de Lencquesaing; Gina McKee; Alba Rohrwacher
- Cinematography: Léo Hinstin
- Edited by: Christophe Pinel
- Music by: Nicolas Godin
- Release date: 4 September 2015 (Telluride Film Festival)
- Countries: France; Belgium
- Language: French
- Budget: $8 million

Taj Mahal is a 2015 French-Belgian thriller film written and directed by Nicolas Saada. It was screened in the Horizons section at the 72nd edition of the Venice Film Festival. The story of the film makes explicit reference to the 2008 Mumbai attacks which have concerned The Taj Mahal Palace Hotel.

== Plot ==
The movie tells the story of a teenager, played by Stacy Martin, who has come to Mumbai with her parents and is staying at the Taj Hotel. She is trapped when the terrorists attack the hotel and her parents are out for dinner.

== Cast ==
- Stacy Martin as Louise
- Louis-Do de Lencquesaing as Louise's Father
- Gina McKee as Louise's Mother
- Alba Rohrwacher as Giovanna
- Frédéric Épaud as Pierre
