= Michaël Cohen =

French actor

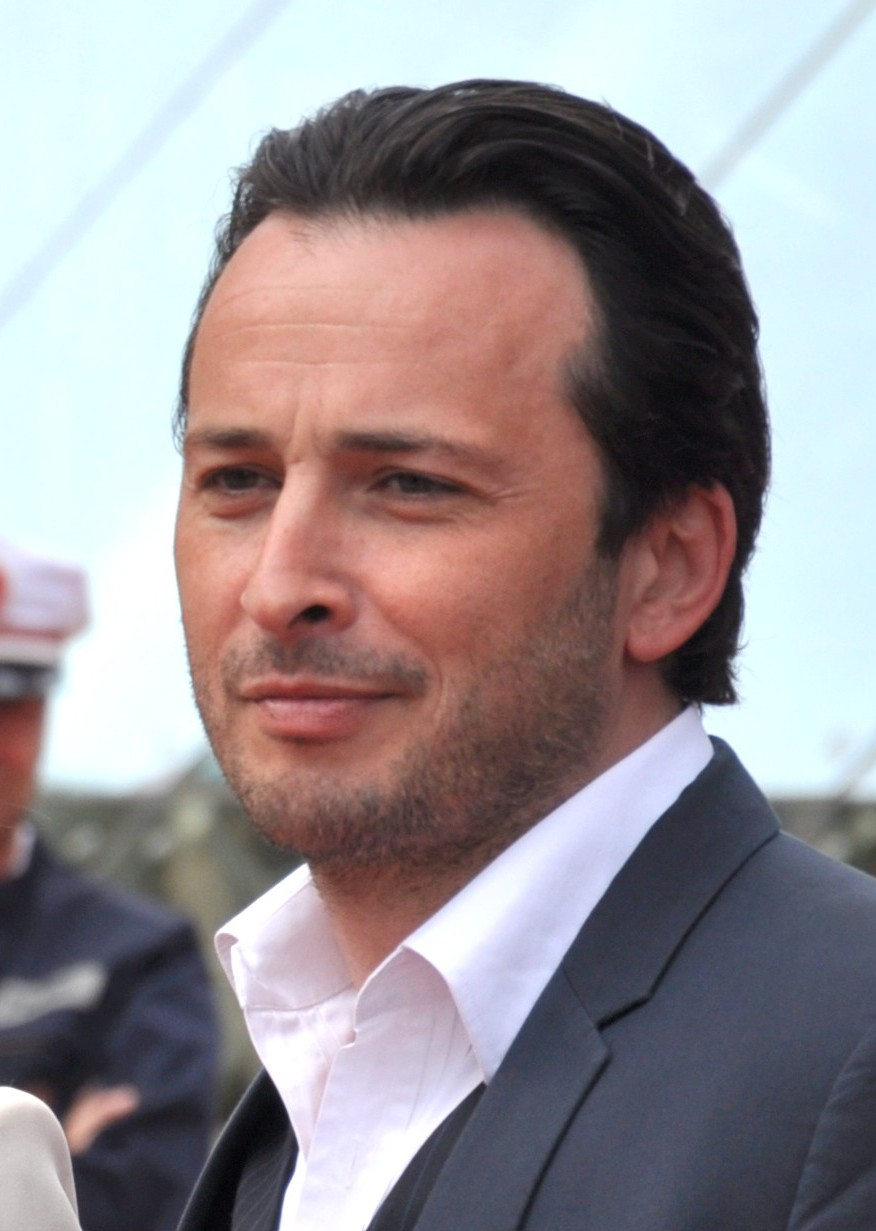
- Born: 13 December 1970 (age 55); Maisons-Laffitte, France
- Occupation: Actor
- Years active: 1991-present
- Partner: Emmanuelle Béart (2008–2011)

Michaël Cohen (born 13 December 1970) is a French actor. He appeared in more than 50 films since 1991.

== Selected filmography ==
Year	Title	Role	Notes
2006	Them	Lucas	
2007	Shall We Kiss?	Gabriel	
2008	Kandisha	Mehdi Jayde	
2011	The Art of Love	Le mari de Zoé (English: Zoe's Husband)	
2015	Caprice	Le comédien au théâtre (English: The actor at the theatre)	
2018	Alad'2	The shrink	
2019	La Belle Époque	Maxime Drumond	
2019	Versus	Léa's father	

1998 La dame aux camélias Armand Duval
