= Jacques the Fatalist =

Novel by Denis Diderot

Jacques the Fatalist and his Master
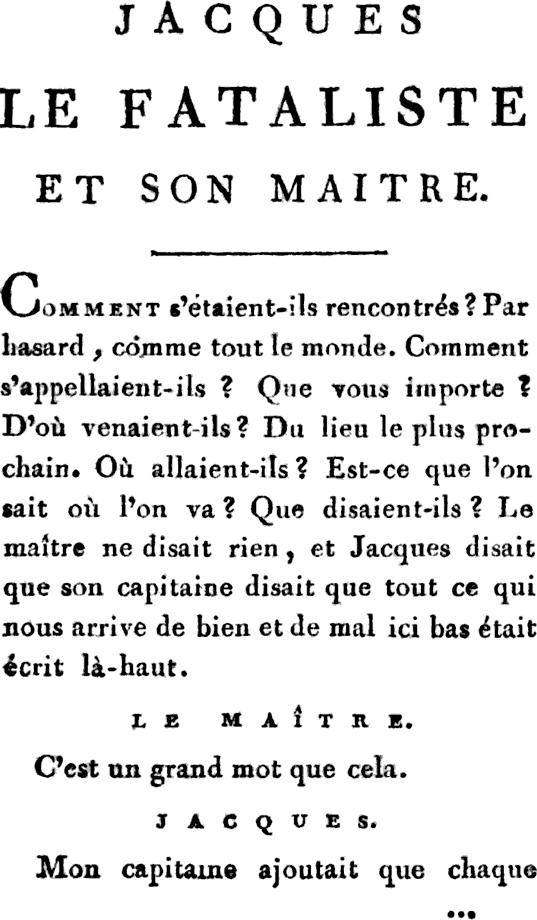
- Title page, 1797 edition
- Author: Denis Diderot
- Original title: Jacques le fataliste et son maître
- Language: French
- Genre: Philosophical novel
- Publication date: 1796
- Publication place: France

Jacques the Fatalist and his Master (French: Jacques le fataliste et son maître) is a novel by Denis Diderot, written during the period 1765–1780. The first French edition was published posthumously in 1796, but it was known earlier in Germany, thanks to Schiller's partial translation, which appeared in 1785 and was retranslated into French in 1793, as well as Mylius's complete German version of 1792.

== Plot ==
The main subject of the book is the relationship between the valet Jacques and his master, who is never named. The two are traveling to a destination the narrator leaves vague, and to dispel the boredom of the journey Jacques is asked by his master to recount the story of his loves. However, Jacques's story is continually interrupted by other characters and various comic mishaps. Other characters in the book tell their own stories and they, too, are continually interrupted, not to mention the narrator's own periodical asides, questions, and remarks to the reader. The tales told are usually humorous, with romance or sex as their overt subject matter. Most tales and anecdotes have, however, a moral or philosophical significance.

Jacques's key philosophy is that everything that happens to us down here, whether for good or for evil, has been written up above ("tout ce qui nous arrive de bien et de mal ici-bas était écrit là-haut"), on a "great scroll" that is unrolled a little bit at a time. Critics such as J. Robert Loy have characterized Jacques's philosophy as not fatalism but determinism. Yet, the story reveals Jacques as a highly moral character who places value on his actions, cares for others, and abides by the mores of his time.

The book is full of contradictory characters and other dualities. One story tells of two men in the army who are so much alike that, though they are the best of friends, they cannot stop dueling and wounding each other. Another concerns Father Hudson, an intelligent and effective reformer of the church who is privately the most debauched character in the book. Even Jacques and his master transcend their apparent roles, as Jacques proves, in his insolence, that his master cannot live without him, and therefore it is Jacques who is the master and the master who is the servant.

The story of Jacques's loves is lifted directly from Tristram Shandy, which Diderot makes no secret of, as the narrator at the end announces the insertion of an entire passage from Tristram Shandy into the story. Throughout the work, the narrator refers derisively to sentimental novels and calls attention to the ways in which events develop more realistically in his book. At other times, the narrator tires of the tedium of narration altogether and obliges the reader to supply certain trivial details.

== Literary significance and criticism ==
The critical reception of the book has been mixed. French critics of the late eighteenth and early nineteenth centuries dismissed it as derivative of Rabelais and Laurence Sterne, as well as unnecessarily bawdy. It made a better impression on the German Romantics, who had had the opportunity to read it before their French counterparts did. Schiller held it in high regard and recommended it strongly to Goethe, who read Jacques in a single sitting. Friedrich Schlegel referred to it positively in his critical fragments (3, 15) and in the Athenaeum fragments (201). It formed something of an ideal of Schlegel's concept of wit. Stendhal, while acknowledging flaws in Jacques, nevertheless considered it a superior and exemplary work. In the twentieth century, critics such as Leo Spitzer and J. Robert Loy tended to see Jacques as a key work in the tradition of Cervantes and Rabelais, focused on celebrating diversity rather than providing clear answers to philosophical problems. As this was contrary to the Catholic Church's point of view, the novel got banned, being listed on the Index Librorum Prohibitorum.

== English translations ==
- Anonymous: James the Fatalist and His Master (G. G. and J. Robinson, 1797, London)
- J. Robert Loy: Jacques the Fatalist and His Master (NYU Press, 1959; revised 1962)
- Wesley D. Camp and Agnes G. Raymond: Jack the Fatalist and His Master (American University Studies, 1984)
- Michael Henry: Jacques the Fatalist (Penguin, 1986)
- David Coward: Jacques the Fatalist (Oxford University Press, 1999)

== Adaptations ==
Jacques le Fataliste is the most commonly adapted of Diderot's works. Robert Bresson adapted a self-contained anecdote, the story of Madame de La Pommeraye, from Jacques le fataliste for his film Les dames du Bois de Boulogne (1945). The dialogue for the film was written by Jean Cocteau. The same episode was the basis of Fritz Wendhausen's film Madame de La Pommeraye's Intrigues (1922). The story was adapted again for film in Emmanuel Mouret's Mademoiselle de Joncquières (2018). Milan Kundera based a play on the novel in 1971, writing in French and using the novel's title, published in an English translation under the title Jacques and His Master: An Homage to Diderot in Three Acts. In his essay The Art of the Novel, Kundera argues that Jacques le Fataliste is one of the masterpieces of the form.

A French-language version for television aired in 1984.

Andrew Crumey's novel Pfitz is a "creative dialogue with Diderot's Jacques the Fatalist". The novel is written in a similar style, but inverts Jacques' determinism, making the servant instead believe that "Everything in this world happens by accident."
