= The Art of Love (2011 film) =

- Film poster
- Directed by: Emmanuel Mouret
- Written by: Emmanuel Mouret
- Produced by: Georges Bermann; Frédéric Niedermayer
- Starring: Emmanuel Mouret; Pascale Arbillot; François Cluzet
- Narrated by: Philippe Torreton
- Cinematography: Laurent Desmet
- Edited by: Martial Salomon
- Music by: Frédéric Norel
- Production company: Moby Dick Films
- Distributed by: Pyramide Distribution
- Release dates: 7 August 2011 (Locarno Film Festival); 23 November 2011 (France)
- Running time: 85 minutes
- Country: France
- Language: French

The Art of Love (French: L'art d'aimer) is a 2011 French comedy film directed and written by Emmanuel Mouret. The film stars Mouret himself, Pascale Arbillot, Ariane Ascaride, Frédérique Bel, François Cluzet, Julie Depardieu, Judith Godrèche, Stanislas Merhar, Elodie Navarre, Laurent Stocker and Gaspard Ulliel, and is narrated by Philippe Torreton.

The Art of Love premiered at the Locarno International Film Festival on 7 August 2011. Although it garnered rather mixed reviews by film critics, it won the Best Screenplay Award at the Montréal World Film Festival, and the Foreign Press Award at Filmfest Hamburg.

== Plot summary ==
The Art of Love is composed of several chapters, which follows a range of Parisian couples. Isabelle (Julie Depardieu) has not had sex in a year. She declines an offer from her friend Zoé (Pascale Arbillot) to "borrow" her husband and instead winds up impersonating Amélie (Judith Godrèche), another friend who cannot bring herself to sleep with her buddy, Boris (Laurent Stocker). The singleton Achille (François Cluzet) thinks his prayers have been answered when his svelte new neighbour (Frédérique Bel) knocks on his door wearing a negligee and suggests they have an affair. In another chapter, a middle-aged couple’s marriage is threatened when wife Emmanuelle (Ariane Ascaride) finds herself lusting after every attractive man she lays eyes upon, while a pair of young lovers (Elodie Navarre and Gaspard Ulliel) discover the pangs of jealousy.

== Cast ==
- Emmanuel Mouret as Louis, Vanessa's colleague
- François Cluzet as Achille
- Frédérique Bel as Achille's neighbor
- Julie Depardieu as Isabelle
- Judith Godrèche as Amélie
- Laurent Stocker as Boris, Amélie's best friend
- Elodie Navarre as Vanessa
- Gaspard Ulliel as William, Vanessa's boyfriend
- Pascale Arbillot as Zoé, Isabelle's best friend
- Ariane Ascaride as Emmanuelle
- Stanislas Merhar as Laurent, a musician looking for true love
- Louis-Do de Lencquesaing as Ludovic
- Philippe Magnan as Paul
- Michaël Cohen as Zoé's husband
- Philippe Torreton as the narrator (voice)

== Release ==
The Art of Love premiered at the Locarno International Film Festival on 7 August 2011. It was then shown at the Namur Francophone Film Festival on 3 October 2011. Two days later, on 5 October, the film had its premiere in Germany at the Hamburg Film Festival. In the United Kingdom, The Art of Love premiered at the BFI London Film Festival on 25 October 2011. The film was released theatrically in France on 27 November. As of March 2012, it was also distributed in Switzerland, Belgium, Canada and Hungary. The film will be theatrically released in Germany on 17 May 2012.

== Reception ==
=== Critical response ===
The Art of Love received mixed to positive reviews. The Première magazine gave it two out of four stars, describing the cast performances as "convincing", but also calling the film "predictable". Isabelle Zirbi of the Les Cahiers du cinéma praised Emmanuel Mouret's directing and writing ideas, awarding the film with three out of four stars. Le Nouvel Observateur reviewed the film more positively, naming it a "delicious patchwork of plots and characters", and gave it four out of five stars. Le Figaro awarded The Art of Love with three stars out of four, as well as Les Inrockuptibles, StudioCiné Live and Télérama. The reviews of Le Parisien, Elle and A voir à lire were more rigid, although they praised the film's comedic situations.

Foreign critiques similarly reviewed the film. Neil Young of The Hollywood Reporter positively reviewed the film, comparing it to the works of Woody Allen, but adding that "some promising ideas in this high-toned romantic comedy get smothered by an over-complicated presentation". Jey Weissberg of the Variety wrote "Mouret's rep and stellar cast mean local biz should be strong [...], but it will take more than art for 'Love' to transcend borders" and gave the film a mixed review. The Time Out gave it three out of five stars, naming it the "frothy fun". Dan Fainaru of the Screen Daily reviewed The Art of Love positively.

=== Accolades ===
On 28 August 2011, Emmanuel Mouret won the Best Screenplay Award at the Montréal World Film Festival. The film was also honoured with the Foreign Press Award at the Hamburg Film Festival.
