= Change of Plans (film) =

- Poster
- French: Le code a changé
- Directed by: Danièle Thompson
- Written by: Danièle Thompson; Christophe Thompson
- Produced by: Alain Terzian; Christine Gozlan; David Poirot-Gozlan
- Starring: Karin Viard; Dany Boon; Marina Foïs; Patrick Bruel; Emmanuelle Seigner; Christopher Thompson; Marina Hands; Patrick Chesnais; Blanca Li; Laurent Stocker; Pierre Arditi
- Cinematography: Jean-Marc Fabre
- Edited by: Sylvie Landra
- Music by: Nicola Piovani
- Production companies: Thelma Films; Alter Films
- Distributed by: StudioCanal
- Release date: 18 February 2009
- Running time: 100 minutes
- Country: France
- Languages: French; Spanish
- Budget: $10.9 million
- Box office: $15 million

Change of Plans (French: Le code a changé; literally, "The Code Has Changed," referring to the entry code for the outer door of the apartment complex where much of the film takes place) is a 2009 French film directed and written by Danièle Thompson.

== Plot ==
The film is centered around a dinner that takes place every year between a group of Parisian friends during the annual "Fête de la Musique" on the 21st of June. Piotr, the husband of Marie-Laurence, who is an overworked lawyer, is on sabbatical leave so it is up to him to organise the dinner party. The dinner does not go as planned: Lucas quarrels with his wife Sarah, Melanie decides that this is the perfect time to confess her extra-marital affair to her husband Alain. Juliette, Marie-Laurence's sister, comes with a surprise guest, Erwann her new companion, who is thirty years older than her. The arrival of Henri, the father of Juliette and Marie-Laurence, is a further upheaval because Juliette is not on speaking terms with him.

== Cast ==
- Karin Viard as Marie-Laurence 'ML' Claverne
- Dany Boon as Piotr
- Marina Foïs as Mélanie Carcassonne
- Patrick Bruel as Doctor Alain Carcassonne
- Emmanuelle Seigner as Sarah Mattei
- Christopher Thompson as Lucas Mattei
- Marina Hands as Juliette
- Patrick Chesnais as Erwann
- Blanca Li as Manuela
- Laurent Stocker as Jean-Louis Mauzard
- Pierre Arditi as Henri
- Jeanne Raimbault as Doris
- Marc Rioufol as Daniel Laurent
- Isabelle Cagnat as Madame Bollet
- Michèle Brousse as Madame Andrieux
- Michel Motu as M. Andrieux
- Guillaume Durand as himself
