= Shall We Kiss? =

- Directed by: Emmanuel Mouret
- Written by: Emmanuel Mouret
- Produced by: Frédéric Niedermayer
- Starring: Virginie Ledoyen; Emmanuel Mouret; Julie Gayet
- Cinematography: Laurent Desmet
- Edited by: Martial Salomon
- Production companies: Arte France Cinéma; Moby Dick Films; TPS Star
- Distributed by: TFM Distribution
- Release dates: 4 September 2007 (Venice); 12 December 2007 (France)
- Running time: 96 minutes
- Country: France
- Language: French

Shall We Kiss? (French title: Un baiser s'il vous plaît) is a 2007 French romantic comedy film directed by Emmanuel Mouret that stars Mouret himself with Virginie Ledoyen, Julie Gayet, Michaël Cohen, Frédérique Bel and Stefano Accorsi. Through frame stories, it light-heartedly explores some of the byways of adulterous passion, ending sombrely.

== Plot ==
On a business trip to Nantes, Émilie is given a lift by Gabriel and agrees to meet him for dinner. When he takes her back to her hotel and asks for a goodnight kiss, she says a kiss can have undesired results and then offers to explain.

In Paris her friend Judith, married to Claudio, shared all her confidences with her bachelor friend Nicolas. One day Nicolas told Judith he was desperate to have a woman, but felt it dishonest to get to know somebody for that sole purpose. Judith suggested trying a prostitute, which Nicolas had never done, but it was an expensive disaster as the girl went crazy when he tried to kiss her. Nicolas then asked if Judith would let him kiss her, just a purely physical thing, and the two ended up in bed.

An intermittent secret affair followed. Even though Nicolas met and started living with Câline, he could not stop seeing Judith. To resolve the burden of guilt each felt towards their innocent partners, the pair decided Câline should be persuaded to seduce Claudio. Unfortunately for their plan, Claudio overheard the plot and told Câline. Left on their own, the two guilty lovers had to face the fact that they had badly wounded their faithful ex-partners, who had done nothing to deserve such treatment.

Ending her story, Émilie says Gabriel can have a proper goodnight kiss, provided he leaves in silence and never tries to see her again.

== Cast ==
- Virginie Ledoyen: Judith (research scientist)
- Emmanuel Mouret: Nicolas (mathematics teacher), Judith's best friend
- Julie Gayet: Émilie (fabric designer), friend of Judith's
- Michaël Cohen: Gabriel (art restorer), attracted to Émilie
- Frédérique Bel: Câline (air hostess), Nicolas' girlfriend
- Stefano Accorsi: Claudio (pharmacist), Judith's husband
- Marie Madinier: Églantine (prostitute)

== Reception ==
The film received mostly positive reviews. On the review aggregator website Rotten Tomatoes, 78% of 74 critics' reviews are positive, with an average rating of 6.6/10. The website's consensus reads: "Shall We Kiss? combines just enough romance and laughs to make for a charming French take on Woody Allen comedies."
