= Prévôt =

Archaic French governmental position

A prévôt (French pronunciation: [pʁevo]) was a governmental position of varying importance during the Ancien Régime in France. Typically referred to a civil officer, magistrate, head of cathedral or church, it is often anglicised as provost. A unit of justice or court overseen by a prévôt was known as a prévôté.

The title is still used on the island of Sark, part of the Bailiwick of Guernsey, to refer to the executive officer of the court.

== Etymology ==
Prévôt is a Middle French term that comes from the Classical Latin praepositus, meaning "person placed in charge" (literally "positioned at the front").

== History ==
The word prévôt (provost) applied to a number of different persons in during the Ancien Régime in France. The term referred to a seignorial officer in charge of managing burgh affairs and rural estates and, on a local level, customarily administered justice.

Therefore, in Paris, for example, there existed both the "Lord Provost of Paris" who presided a lower royal court, as well as the very important and influential "Provost of the Merchants" (prévôt des marchands), i.e. the Dean of the City Guilds, who headed traditionally the City Council and the city's merchant companies, thus being de facto a kind of feudal mayor.

In addition to these two, there were "Provost Marshals", or "Provosts of the Marshals of France" (Prévôts des Maréchaux de France); the "Provost of the Royal Residence" (Prévôt de l'Hôtel du Roi), or later the "Lord High Provost of France" (Grand Prévôt de France); and the "Provost General" (Prévôt général) later, or the "Lord High Provost of the Mint" (Grand Prévôt des Monnaies or de la Monnaie).

The role extended into New France, with Prévôté de Québec and Prévôt de Montréal in the 17th and the 18th centuries.

=== Royal provosts ===
The most important and well-known provosts, as part of the King's personal aids administering the scattered parts of the royal domain, were the "Royal Provosts" (Prévôts royaux). The regional title of those provosts varied widely from province to province for traditional reasons: "castellans" (châtelains) in Normandy and Burgundy and "vicars" (viguiers) in the South. These titles were retained from earlier times when formerly independent provinces were conquered and subsumed under the French Crown. Royal provosts were created by the Capetian monarchy around the 11th century. Provosts replaced viscounts wherever a viscounty had not been made a fief, which made it likely that the domainal provost position was fashioned after the corresponding ecclesiastical provost of cathedral chapters, a charge which was strongly developed in the same era.

Royal provostships were double faceted. Provosts were initially entrusted with royal power and carried out the royal part of local administration, including the collection of the Crown's domainal revenues and all taxes and duties owed to the King within a provostship's jurisdiction. Also, they were responsible for military defense such as raising local contingents for royal armies.

Also, the provosts administered justice with very limited judicial powers. For instance, they never had any jurisdiction over noblemen or feudal tenants (hommes de fief), who instead fell under the jurisdiction of either a regional royal court (parlement) or their respective lord's court where they were tried before a jury of their peers, that is, the lord's other vassals. Provosts had no jurisdiction over purely rural areas, the pies pays, which instead fell to local lordship jurisdiction or lower royal courts. Basically, Provost jurisdiction was restricted to minor and medium delinquency committed in towns under their control, but was often usurped by Burgh/City courts chaired by burgesses.

Until the end of the Ancien Régime, a number of "Military Provost" positions (Prévôts d'épée, literally "Provosts of the Sword") survived until they were replaced by other judging charges (e.g. lord lieutenants or military auditors) in administering military justice.

From the 11th century, the provosts tended increasingly to make their positions hereditary and thus became more difficult to control. One of the King's great officers, the Great Seneschal, became their supervisor. In the 12th century, the office of provost was put up for bidding, and thereafter provosts were farmers of revenues. The provost thus received the speculative right to collect the King's seignorial revenues within his provostship, which remained his primary role. Short-term appointments also helped stem the heritability of offices. Very early, however, certain provostships were bestowed en garde: if the provost regularly rendered accounts to the King for his collections. Farmed provostships (prévôtes en ferme) were naturally a source of abuse and oppression. Naturally, too, the people were discontent. Joinville told of how under St Louis the provostship of Paris became an accountable provostship (prévôté en garde). With the death of Louis XI, farmed provostships were still numerous and spurred a remonstrance from the States General in 1484. Charles VIII promised to abolish the office in 1493, but the office is mentioned in the Ordinance of 1498. They disappeared in the 16th century, by which time the provosts had become regular officials, their office, however, being purchasable.

Further oversight and weakening of provostships occurred when, to monitor their performance and curtail abuses, the Crown established itinerant justices known as bailies (bailli, plural baillis, from which is derived the English word "Bailiff") to hear complaints against them. With the office of Great Seneschal vacant after 1191, the bailies became stationary and established themselves as powerful officials superior to provosts. A bailie's district is called a bailliary (bailliage) and included about half a dozen provostships (prévôtés). When previously impossible appeals of provost judgements were instituted by the Crown, that competence of appeal was given to the bailie.

Moreover, in the 14th century, provosts no longer were in charge of collecting domainal revenues, except in farmed provostships, having instead yielded this responsibility to "royal receivers" (receveurs royaux). Raising local army contingents (ban, draft; and arrière-ban, reserve) also passed to bailies. Provosts, therefore, retained the sole function of inferior judges over vassals with original jurisdiction concurrent with bailies over claims against noblemen and actions reserved for royal courts (cas royaux, royal cases). This followed a precedent established in the chief feudal courts in the 13th and 14th centuries in which summary provostship suits were distinguished from solemn bailliary sessions (assises).

The provost as judge sat a single bench with sole judicial authority over his Court. He was, however, required to seek the advice of legally-qualified experts (cousellors or attorneys) of his choosing, and, in so doing, was said to "summon his council" (appelait à son conseil). In 1578, official magistrates (conseillers-magistrats) were created, but were suppressed by the 1579 Ordinance of Blois. The office was restored in 1609 by simple decree of the King's Council, but it was opposed by the Parlement courts and seems to have been conferred in but few instances.

=== Provost Marshals ===
French Provost Marshals were non-judicial officers (officiers de la robe courte, literally "officers of the short gown") attached to the Marshalcy (Maréchaussée) which under the Old Regime was vested with police authority. It would be replaced after the Revolution of 1789 by the newly-created Gendarmerie nationale.

Originally, they were assigned to judge crimes committed by people in the army, but over the course of the 14th and 15th centuries, they gained the right to judge certain types of misdemeanors and felonies committed by the military and civilians alike. They became fixed with set areas of authority, and the offences falling within their jurisdiction came to be called provost crimes (cas prévôtaux, literally "provostal cases"). Provost crimes included crimes of major violence and crimes committed by repeat offenders (repris de justice), who were familiarly known as the gibier des prévôts des maréchaux (Provost Marshal jailbirds; literally "Game of the Provosts of the Marshalls"). They had military jurisdiction in regiments without "Military Provost" (Prévôt d'épée; see above), and their rulings were not appealable. However, the provost was required to consult a certain number of ordinary judges or "masters of law". As presidial judges had concurrent jurisdiction with Provost Marshals for non-military cases, the two vied openly to be vested.

== See also ==
- Provost (civil), similar post in Scotland
- Provost Marshal
