= Louise Élisabeth de Croÿ =

French writer and noble

- Duchess of Tourzel
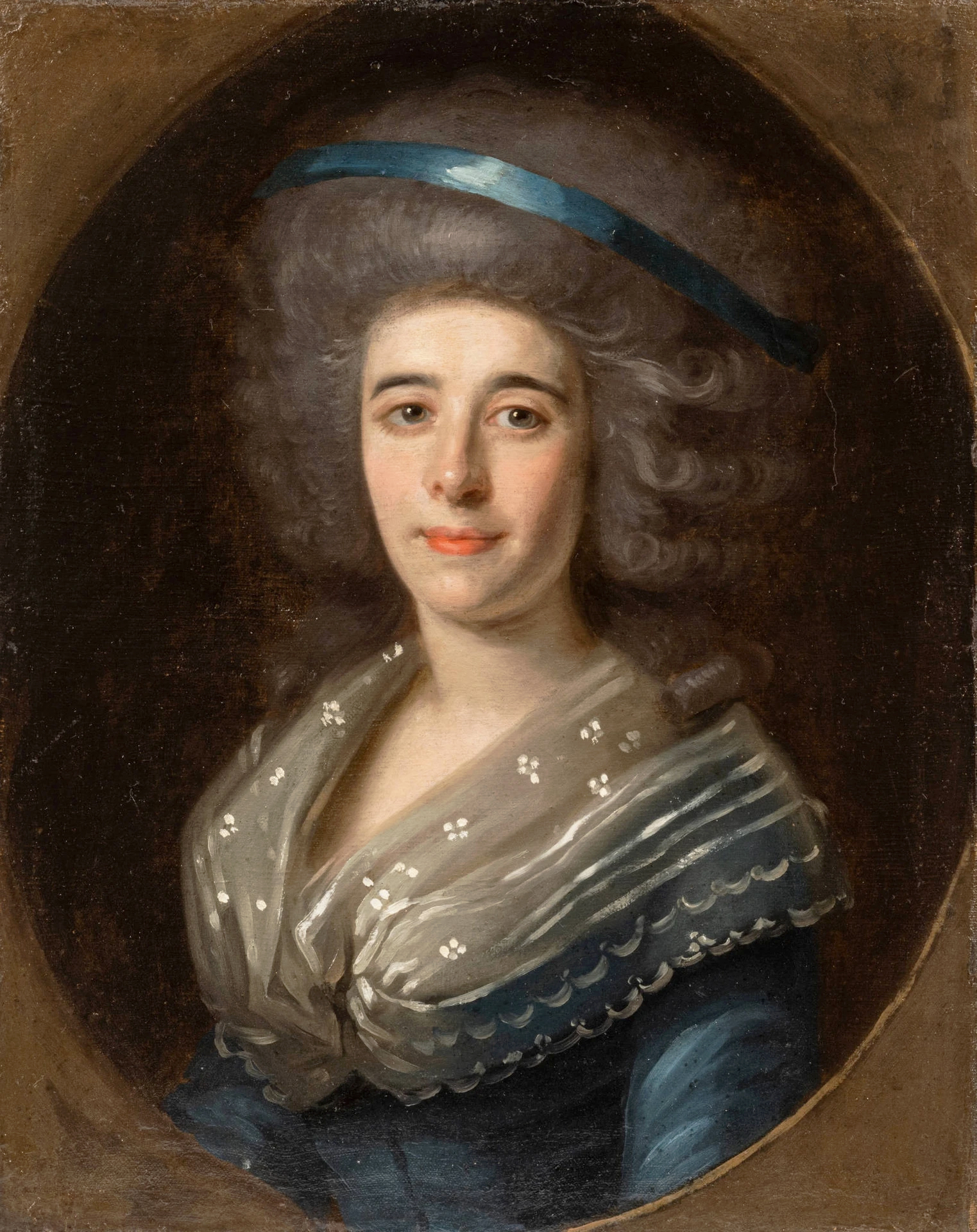
- Born: 11 June 1749; Paris, France
- Died: 15 May 1832 (aged 82); Paris, France
- Spouses: Louis François du Bouchet de Sourches, Marquis of Tourzel (m. 1766–1786)
- Issue: Josephine de Tourzel (daughter); Louise de Tourzel (daughter); Yves de Tourzel (son); Madeleine de Tourzel (daughter); Pauline de Tourzel (daughter)
- Father: Louis Ferdinand Joseph de Croÿ, Duke of Havré
- Mother: Marie Louise Cunégonde de Montmorency-Luxembourg

Louise-Élisabeth de Croÿ (Louise Élisabeth Félicité Françoise Armande Anne Marie Jeanne Joséphine; 11 June 1749 – 15 May 1832) was a French noblewoman and courtier, as the Marquise of Tourzel. She was the Governess of the Children of France from 1789 until 1792. Decades after the French Revolution, Louise-Élisabeth published her memoirs, which presented a unique perspective on the royal family during the French Revolution. She later acquired the title of duchess.

== Life ==
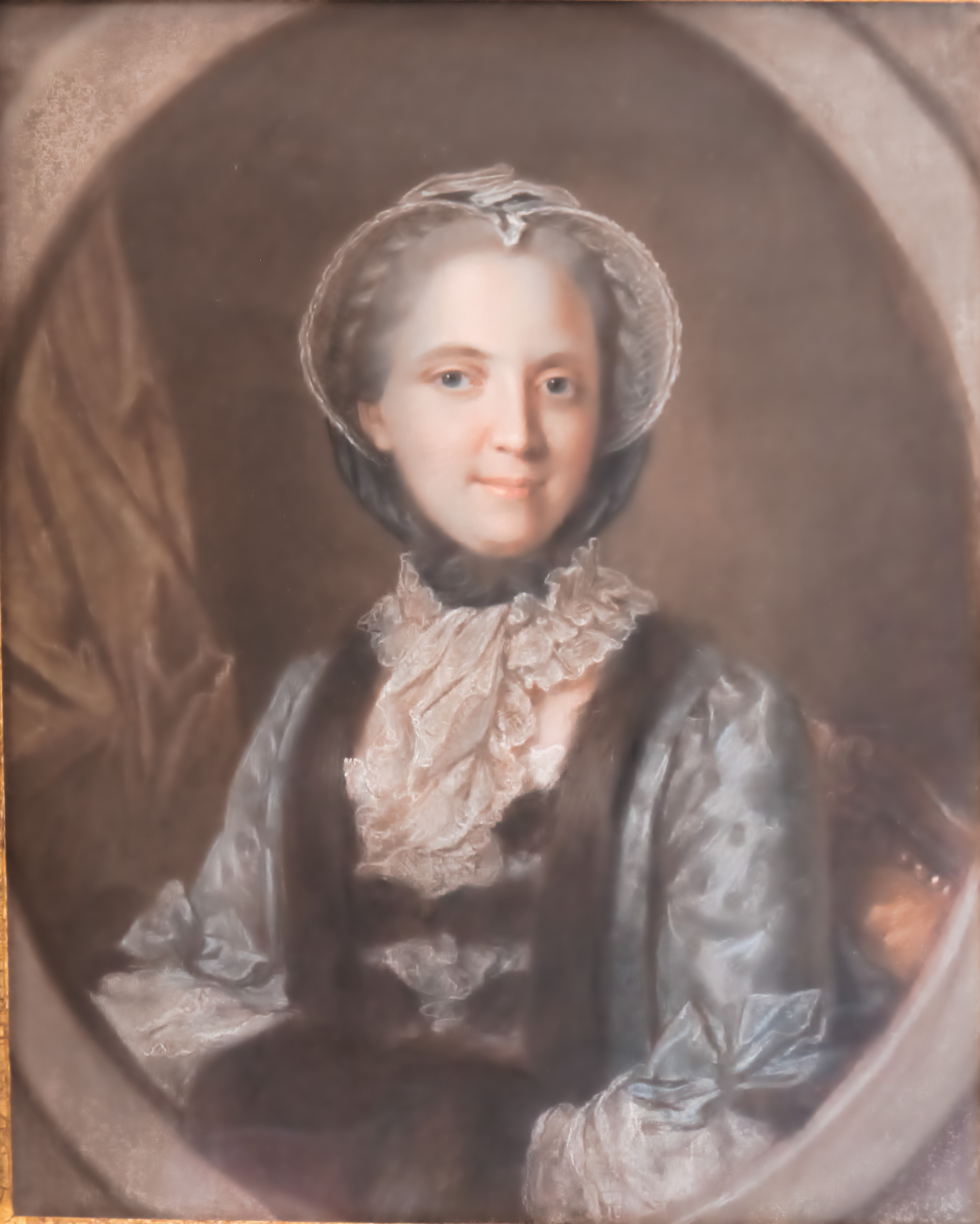
Marie-Louise Cunégonde de Montmorency-Luxembourg, mother of Louise-Élisabeth de Croÿ de Tourzel

Louise Élisabeth was born in Paris, into the illustrious House of Croÿ during the reign of King Louis XV. She was the daughter of Louis Ferdinand Joseph de Croÿ, Duke of Havré and his wife, Princess Marie Louise Cunégonde de Montmorency-Luxembourg.

Louise Élisabeth was married in 1766, at the age of seventeen, to the Marquis de Tourzel. They enjoyed a happy marriage for twenty years, in which Louise Élisabeth bore six children; her husband was, however, killed in a hunting accident in 1786. She was a staunch supporter of the House of Bourbon, and had this motto engraved on a ring she refused to part with: Lord, save the King, the Dauphin, and his sister!.

=== French Revolution ===
After the Storming of the Bastille in 1789, many members of Queen Marie Antoinette’s intimate circle were forced to flee abroad. The duchesse de Polignac, the queen's favourite and the governess to the royal children, was forced to emigrate to Switzerland. Marie Antoinette appointed Louise Élisabeth to the newly vacant post, with particular attention to be paid to the dauphin, Louis-Charles. The marquise was advised to curb the dauphin's fear of loud noises, particularly the barking of the many dogs at Versailles.

After an angry mob of women incited by revolutionaries stormed the Palace of Versailles on 5 October 1789, the marquise accompanied the royal family to live in the Tuileries Palace in Paris. Tourzel's loyalty was strong, and she refused to abandon the royal children as political strife in the nation dramatically increased. She even accompanied the king and his family on the flight to Varennes, for a royalist stronghold in Montmédy. This attempt failed, and the entire party was brought back to Paris.

After the abolition of the monarchy in 1792, Louise Élisabeth was separated from the royal family and imprisoned in the La Force Prison, and soon the Prison Port-Libre. Also imprisoned at the same time was her daughter, Pauline de Tourzel, and Marie Antoinette's personal friend, Princesse de Lamballe.

Shortly after their imprisonment, they found themselves targeted in the September Massacres, when thousands of incarcerated people in Paris were massacred by mobs trying to rid the prisons of jailed aristocrats they suspected of treason. Louise Élisabeth and her daughter were smuggled out of the prison by a mysterious man, but Princesse de Lamballe was not so fortunate. She was murdered, and her severed head was then paraded around the city. Louise Élisabeth and her daughter were advised by their rescuer, a "Monsieur Hardi", to leave Paris because Pauline had escaped the prison illegally and was in danger of arrest, and they left for the countryside, where they lived incognito in Vincennes and at the property of her son in Abondant outside of Dreux.

In January 1793, King Louis XVI was executed. In October, the former queen of France, Marie Antoinette, was also sent to the guillotine. Louise Élisabeth was devastated by their deaths, and she was equally shocked to hear of the death of Louis-Charles in 1795. Several times over the coming decades, Louise Élisabeth was accosted by various men pretending to be "Louis XVII".

=== Later years ===
As soon as Marie-Thérése-Charlotte was allowed visits again by the government, she was among the first who requested to see her in her prison cell in the Temple. It was Louise Élisabeth who informed Marie-Therese that she was to marry her cousin Louis Antoine, Duke of Angoulême, on the request of the latter’s father. She attended the wedding of Marie-Therese and Louis Antoine in Mitau in the June of 1799, and remained in Mitau for some time. Because of her well-known sympathy for the Bourbon family, she was put under secret surveillance of Napoleon I’s secret police.

During the Bourbon Restoration, Louise Élisabeth was made a duchess by King Charles X. She later published her memoirs, which are an invaluable historical account of the final days of the royal household. Her daughter, Pauline, became a lady-in-waiting to Marie Antoinette's only surviving child, Marie-Thérèse-Charlotte.

Hôtel d'Estrées was her residence in Paris.

== Children ==
- Henriette Adélaïde Joséphine de Tourzel (4 November 1765 – 11 March 1837), married Armand Joseph de Béthune, Duc de Charest. She built the Château de Groussay.
- Zoé Anne Louise de Tourzel (24 June 1767 – 3 August 1794), married Pierre François Balthazar of Sainte-Aldegonde, and had a son and a daughter.
- Charles Louis Yves de Tourzel (27 August 1768 – 4 April 1815), Marquis de Sourches de Tourzel, married Augustine Du Pons and had two daughters.
- Joséphine Marie Madeleine de Tourzel (20 October 1769 – 4 May 1838), married the Comte de Saint-Aldegonde, and had two daughters.
- Marie Charlotte Pauline de Tourzel (15 October 1771 – 9 July 1839), lady-in-waiting to the Marie Thérèse of France, married the Comte de Béarn and had a son and a daughter.

== In fiction ==
Louise-Élisabeth de Tourzel has been featured in several novels about the French royal family, including the Marie Antoinette romances by Alexandre Dumas.

The novels include:

- Trianon, by Elena Maria Vidal
- Madame Royale, by Elena Maria Vidal
- Flaunting, Extravagant Queen, by Jean Plaidy
- Ernestine, by Michiel B.L. Korte

The character of Louise-Élisabeth appeared in the 1956 French film Marie-Antoinette reine de France.

Court offices
Preceded by The Duchess of Polignac	Governess of the Children of France; 1789–1792	Monarchy abolished
