= Fais-moi plaisir! =

- Directed by: Emmanuel Mouret
- Written by: Emmanuel Mouret
- Produced by: Frédéric Niedermayer
- Starring: Emmanuel Mouret; Judith Godrèche; Frédérique Bel; Déborah François
- Cinematography: Laurent Desmet
- Edited by: Martial Salomon
- Distributed by: Pyramide Distribution
- Release dates: 24 June 2009 (France); 24 June 2009 (Belgium)
- Running time: 84 minutes
- Country: France
- Language: French

Fais-moi plaisir! is a 2009 French romantic comedy film directed by Emmanuel Mouret, also released under the English title Please, Please Me!. It stars Mouret alongside Judith Godrèche, Frédérique Bel, Déborah François and Jacques Weber. It received generally positive reviews from critics in the French-speaking press.

== Plot ==
Ariane is upset one morning when Jean-Jacques, who she lives with, answers his portable phone and speaks to a woman. When she demands an explanation, he tells her the story. An old friend he met in a bar told him a sure way to arouse a woman's interest: you write a heartfelt note asking her to meet you alone in five minutes time. When Jean-Jacques tried it on a train, it worked. He next tried it in a bar with Élisabeth, the one who had just rung him. Ariane decides he must get this out of his system and see this Élisabeth once again, even if he sleeps with her.

So he agrees to go to a party that evening at Élisabeth's palatial apartment. Before it begins she takes him to see her father, who is the President of the Republic. Jean-Jacques knows nobody at the party and when it ends Élisabeth takes him to her bedroom, where she passes out. Élisabeth's fiancé then turns up, and Jean-Jacques is smuggled out by the sympathetic maid, Aneth. She takes him back to her apartment to sew up his trousers, which had been damaged, and a romantic night is about to begin when her male flatmate wakes up. Smuggled out, Jean-Jacques is arrested on the street and is only freed when Élisabeth confirms his story.

On his way home, he sees Ariane. She says she went to a bar with a girlfriend and was passed a note. Rather full of mojitos, she went out to meet the man and told him off for his cheap misogynistic ploy. He took it very well, bought her some more drinks, and they went back to his apartment. When Jean-Jacques asks what they did, Ariane just says: “The same thing as you”.

== Cast ==
- Emmanuel Mouret as Jean-Jacques
- Judith Godrèche as Élisabeth
- Frédérique Bel as Ariane
- Déborah François as Aneth
- Jacques Weber as the French President
- Frédéric Épaud
- Dany Brillant as Rudolph
