= Saint-Symphorien, Sarthe =

Saint-Symphorien
- Commune
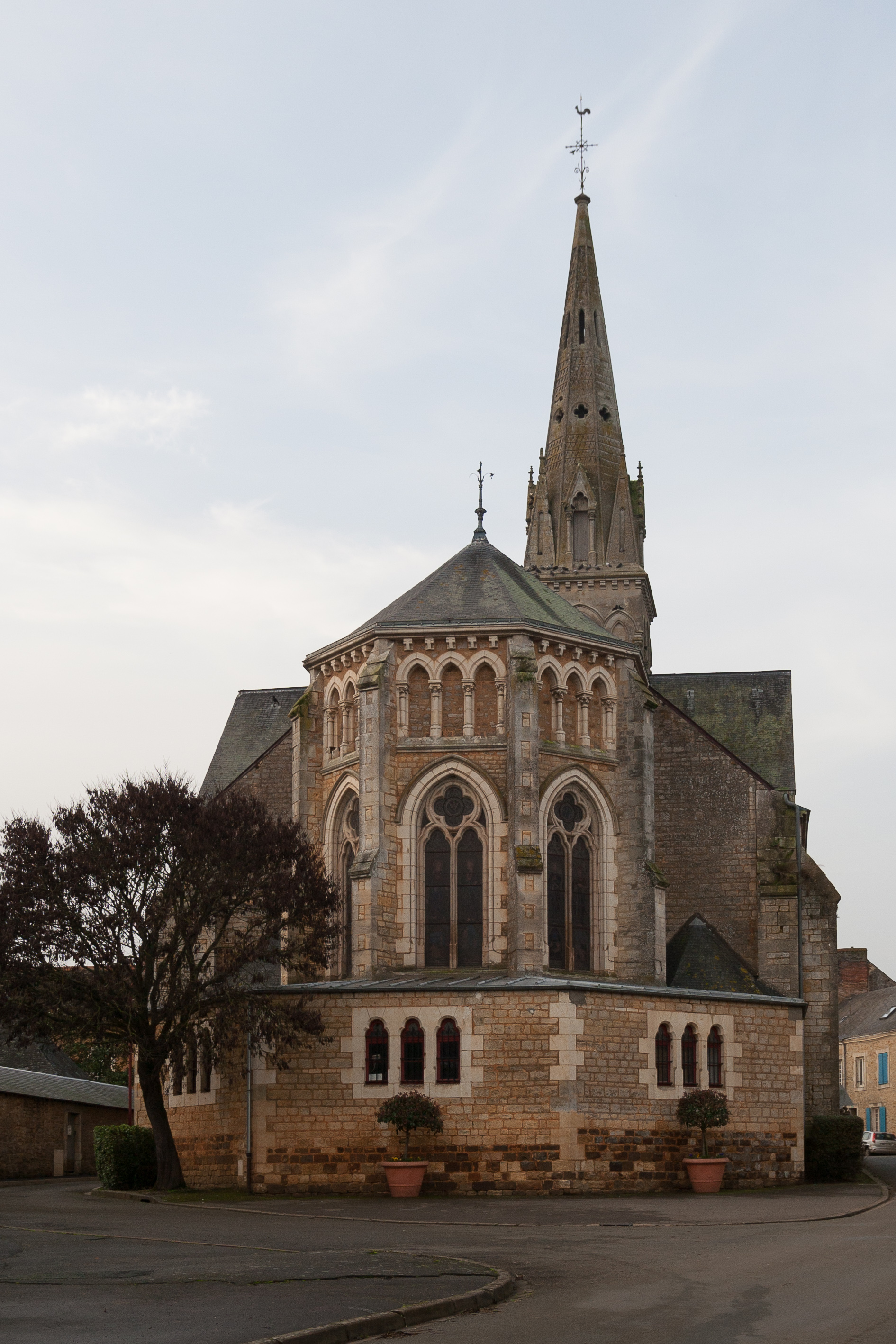
- The church of Saint-Symphorien
- Location of Saint-Symphorien
- Location within France Location within Pays de la Loire
- Coordinates: 48°04′19″N 0°06′46″W
- Country: France
- Region: Pays de la Loire
- Department: Sarthe
- Arrondissement: Mamers
- Canton: Loué
- Intercommunality: Champagne Conlinoise et Pays de Sillé

Government
  - Mayor (2020–2026): Francis Coulon
- Area^{1}: 22.49 km^{2} (8.68 sq mi)
- Highest elevation: 188 m (617 ft)
- Lowest elevation: 83 m (272 ft)
- Population (2023): 509
  - Density: 22.6/km^{2} (58.6/sq mi)
- Demonym(s): Saint-Symphorinois, Saint-Symphorinoise
- Time zone: UTC+01:00 (CET)
  - Summer (DST): UTC+02:00 (CEST)
- INSEE/Postal code: 72321 /72240
- ^{1} French Land Register data, which excludes lakes, ponds, glaciers > 1 km^{2} (0.386 sq mi or 247 acres) and river estuaries.

Saint-Symphorien (French pronunciation: [sɛ̃ sɛ̃fɔʁjɛ̃]) is a commune in the Sarthe department in the region of Pays de la Loire in north-western France.

== See also ==
- Communes of the Sarthe department
