= Emmanuel Mouret =

French actor and director

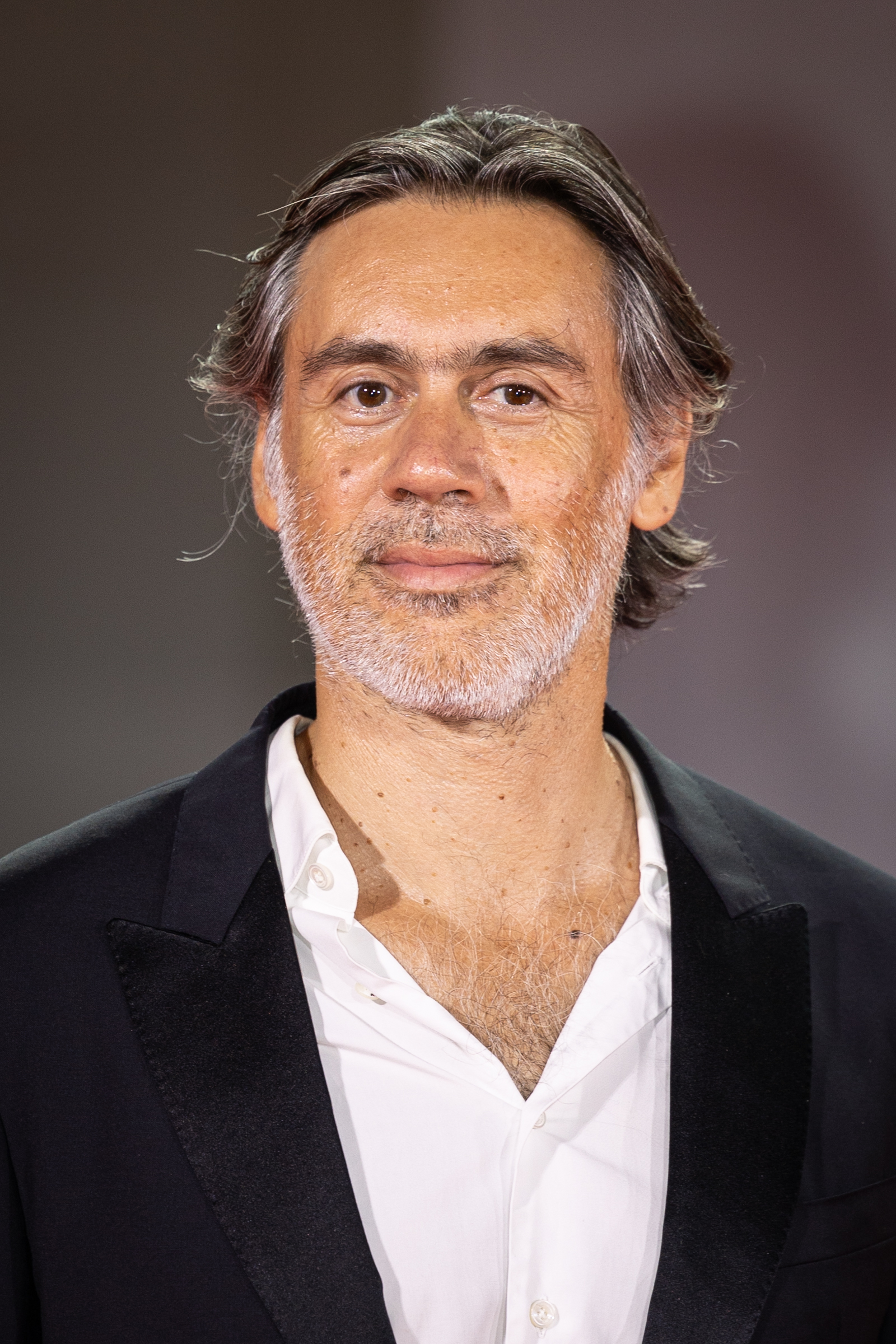
- Mouret in 2024.
- Born: 30 June 1970 (age 56); Marseille, France
- Citizenship: French
- Occupations: Actor, director, screenwriter
- Years active: 1998–present

Emmanuel Mouret (French: [ɛmanɥɛl muʁɛ]; born 30 June 1970) is a French actor, director and screenwriter. Most known for his romantic comedy films Love Affair(s) (2020), Diary of a Fleeting Affair (2022) and Three Friends (2024).

== Life and career ==
He was born on 30 June 1970 in Marseille, Bouches-du-Rhône, Provence-Alpes-Côte d'Azur, France. He graduated from La Fémis (9th promotion, directing department).

== Filmography ==
Year	English Title	Original Title	Notes
1998	Caresse		Also actor
1999	Promène-toi donc tout nu!		Also actor
2000	Laissons Lucie faire!		Also actor
2004	Venus and Fleur	Vénus et Fleur	Also actor
2006	Change of Address	Changement d'adresse	Also actor
2007	Shall We Kiss?	Un baiser s'il vous plaît	Also actor
2008	God's Offices	Les bureaux de Dieu	Also actor
2009	Please, Please Me!	Fais-moi plaisir!	Also actor
2011	The Art of Love	L'Art d'aimer	Also actor
2015	Caprice		Also actor
2018	Lady J	Mademoiselle de Joncquières	
2020	Love Affair(s)	Les Choses qu'on dit, les choses qu'on fait	
2022	Diary of a Fleeting Affair	Chronique d'une liaison passagère	
2024	Three Friends	Trois Amies	
TBA	Dr. Albertini’s Office		Filming

== Awards and nominations ==
- 2006 Tokyo Film Festival Tokyo Grand Prix for Changement d'adresse (2006)
