= John David Miles =

American politician (1947–2024)

Member of the Georgia House of Representatives from the 107th district
- In office 1981–1983
- Preceded by: A. D. Clifton
- Succeeded by: Jimmy Lord

Personal details
- Born: August 15, 1947 Savannah, Georgia, U.S.
- Died: February 22, 2024 (aged 76) Statesboro, Georgia, U.S.
- Party: Democratic
- Spouse: Nancy Miles

John David Miles (August 15, 1947 – February 22, 2024) was an American politician. He served as a Democratic member for the 107th district of the Georgia House of Representatives.

== Life and career ==
Miles was born in Savannah, Georgia on August 15, 1947. He once worked as a businessperson. In 1981, he was elected to represent the 107th district of the Georgia House of Representatives, succeeding A. D. Clifton. He served until 1983, when he was succeeded by Jimmy Lord. Miles died in Statesboro, Georgia on February 22, 2024, at the age of 76.
