= Timothy Barr =

American politician

Tim Barr
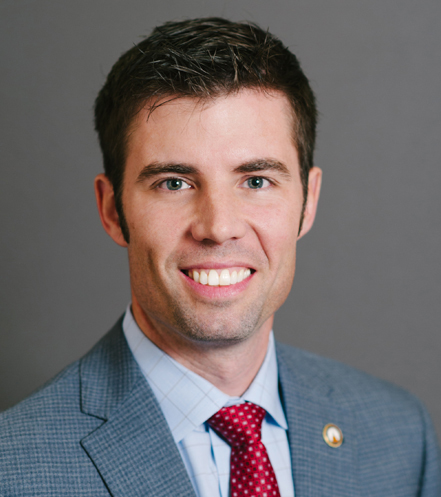
- Official portrait, 2015

Member of the Georgia House of Representatives from the 103rd district
- In office January 14, 2013 – January 9, 2023
- Preceded by: David Casas
- Succeeded by: Derrick McCollum (Redistricting)

Personal details
- Born: Timothy Lee Barr; October 3, 1980 (age 46) Georgia, U.S.
- Party: Republican
- Spouse: Melinda
- Children: 4

Timothy Lee Barr (born October 3, 1980) is an American politician who served as a member of the Georgia House of Representatives from the 103rd District from 2013 to 2023. He is a member of the Republican party and was a member of the Georgia Freedom Caucus.

== Early life ==
Barr was born and raised in northeastern Georgia. In high school, Barr worked as a staffer for members of the Georgia General Assembly.

== Career ==
He learned the construction business from his father and grandfather, eventually starting his own company in 2005.

=== Georgia House of Representatives ===
In 2012, Barr declared his candidacy for a seat in the 103rd district in the Georgia House of Representatives. He defeated Ken Russell in the primary election and won the seat unopposed in the November general election.

During the 2019–2020 legislative session, Barr served as secretary of the House Small Business Development Committee and chair of the House Code Revision Committee.

=== 2022 congressional election ===
On May 14, 2021, Barr declared his candidacy for Georgia's 10th congressional district in the 2022 election.

== Personal life ==
Barr has been outspoken about his Christian faith, saying, "When you get me, you get a man of faith, of deep convictions. For me, it is who I am. I can't split my life. My faith is who I am and it leads my decisions." He and his wife, Melinda, have been involved in Christian missionary work, including the construction of two orphanages in Bolivia. Barr and his wife attend Killian Hill Baptist Church in Lilburn, Georgia.

== Electoral history ==
Georgia House District 103 Republican primary, 2012
Party	Candidate	Votes	%
Republican	Timothy Barr	4,231	62.7
Republican	Ken Russell	2,514	37.3
Total votes		6,745	100.00

Georgia House District 103 election, 2012
Party	Candidate	Votes	%
Republican	Timothy Barr	19,785	100.00
Total votes		19,785	100.00

Georgia House District 103 Republican primary, 2014
Party	Candidate	Votes	%
Republican	Timothy Barr	3,305	100.00
Total votes		3,305	100.00

Georgia House District 103 election, 2014
Party	Candidate	Votes	%
Republican	Timothy Barr	14,698	100.00
Total votes		14,698	100.00

Georgia House District 103 Republican primary, 2016
Party	Candidate	Votes	%
Republican	Timothy Barr	2,059	100.00
Total votes		2,059	100.00

Georgia House District 103 election, 2016
Party	Candidate	Votes	%
Republican	Timothy Barr	23,755	100.00
Total votes		23,755	100.00

Georgia House of Representatives
Preceded by David Casas	Member of the Georgia House of Representatives from the 103rd district 2019–2023	Succeeded by Soo Hong
