= Lussi =

Lussi may refer to:

- Lamar Lussi Athletic Complex, also called "the Lussi", multi-sport high school athletic complex in Lilburn, Georgia
- Swedish celebration of Saint Lucy's Day

== People ==
- Gustave Lussi (1898–1993), Swiss-American figure skating coach
- Nina Lussi (born 1994), American ski jumper
- Rochus Lussi (born 1965), Swiss artist
- Teddy Lussi-Modeste (born 1978), French film director, screenwriter and literature teacher
