= Jimmy Lord =

American politician

Member of the Georgia House of Representatives from the 142nd district
- In office 2005–2009
- Preceded by: Ron Borders
- Succeeded by: Mack Jackson

Member of the Georgia House of Representatives from the 103rd district
- In office 2003–2005
- Preceded by: Lynn Smith
- Succeeded by: David Casas

Member of the Georgia House of Representatives from the 121st district
- In office 1993–2003
- Preceded by: Clinton Oliver
- Succeeded by: Terry E. Barnard (Post 1); Bert Smith Oliver (Post 2)

Member of the Georgia House of Representatives from the 107th district
- In office 1983–1993
- Preceded by: John David Miles
- Succeeded by: John Carlisle

Member of the Georgia House of Representatives from the 105th district
- In office 1977–1983
- Preceded by: Thomas Caswell Carr
- Succeeded by: Bobby Parham

Personal details
- Born: March 24, 1936 Washington County, Georgia, U.S.
- Died: October 14, 2015 (aged 79) Washington County, Georgia, U.S.
- Party: Democratic
- Spouse: Fronie McCoy
- Education: John A. Gupton College
- Occupation: Funeral director

Jimmy B. Lord (March 24, 1936 – October 14, 2015) was an American politician in the state of Georgia.

Lord is an alumnus of the John A. Gupton College, a mortuary science school in Nashville, Tennessee. He was a funeral director (self employed) and businessman. He served in the Georgia House of Representatives from 1977 to 2008. He married Fronie McCoy and has two children.

He died on October 14, 2015, in Washington County.

Georgia House of Representatives
Preceded by Thomas Caswell Carr	Member of the Georgia House of Representatives from the 105th district 1977–1983	Succeeded by Bobby Parham
Preceded by John David Miles	Member of the Georgia House of Representatives from the 107th district 1983–1993	Succeeded by John Carlisle
Preceded by Clinton Oliver	Member of the Georgia House of Representatives from the 121st district 1993–2003	Succeeded by Terry E. Barnard (Post 1); Bert Smith Oliver (Post 2)
Preceded by Lynn Smith	Member of the Georgia House of Representatives from the 103rd district 2003–2005	Succeeded by David Casas
Preceded by Ron Borders	Member of the Georgia House of Representatives from the 142nd district 2005–2009	Succeeded by Mack Jackson
