= The Price of Success =

The Price of Success may refer to:

- The Price of Success (1925 film)
- The Price of Success (2017 film)
