= Friend zone (disambiguation) =

Friend zone is a relationship where one person wishes to enter into a romantic or sexual relationship, while the other does not.

Friend zone or friendzone may also refer to:

- Friend Zone (2009 film), a Spanish film
- Friend Zone (song), a song by Danielle Bradbery
- Friend Zone (TV series), a 2018 Thai television series
  - Friend Zone 2: Dangerous Area, a 2020 Thai television series and sequel
- Friend Zone (2019 film), a Thai romantic comedy
- Friendzone (TV series), a reality television series
- Friendzone (duo), an American musical duo
- Friendzone (film), a 2021 French film
