= A Private Life =

2025 French film by Rebecca Zlotowski

- Theatrical release poster
- French: Vie privée
- Directed by: Rebecca Zlotowski
- Written by: Rebecca Zlotowski; Anne Berest; Gaëlle Macé
- Produced by: Frederic Jouve
- Starring: Jodie Foster; Daniel Auteuil; Virginie Efira
- Cinematography: George Lechaptois
- Edited by: Géraldine Mangenot
- Music by: Rob
- Production companies: Les Films Velvet; France 3 Cinéma
- Distributed by: Ad Vitam
- Release dates: 20 May 2025 (Cannes); 26 November 2025 (France); 16 January 2026 (United States)
- Running time: 103 minutes
- Country: France
- Language: French
- Budget: $5 million
- Box office: $10.3 million

A Private Life (French: Vie privée) is a 2025 French mystery thriller film directed and co-written by Rebecca Zlotowski, starring Jodie Foster, alongside Daniel Auteuil, Virginie Efira, Mathieu Amalric, Vincent Lacoste, and Luàna Bajrami.

The film had its world premiere at the out of competition section of the 2025 Cannes Film Festival on 20 May. It was theatrically released in France by Ad Vitam in 26 November. The film received positive reviews from critics with particular praise for Foster's performance, which earned her nominations for the Lumière Award for Best Actress, becoming the first American to receive a nomination.

== Plot ==
Dr. Lilian Steiner is a Jewish-American psychiatrist, working from her Paris home. Her patient Pierre ends their sessions after he finally quits smoking; crediting a hypnotist, he threatens to sue Lilian for years of unsuccessful therapy. Another patient, Paula, has died, and her daughter Valérie invites Lilian to join the family for the shiva, but Paula's husband Simon furiously demands that she leave.

Lilian has a strained relationship with her son Julien, who helps her order disks for the MiniDisc recorder she uses to document her sessions. Struck by persistent and uncharacteristic crying, she reaches out to her ex-husband Gabriel, an ophthalmologist, who determines that there is nothing wrong with her eyes.

Valérie reveals that her mother committed suicide with pills prescribed by Lilian, and gives her a prescription with a mysterious message found in Paula's hand.

Fed up with her tears, Lilian visits the hypnotist Jessica, who leads her in a surreal hypnotherapy session. The skeptical Lilian experiences a vision of herself as a male Jewish cellist performing in Nazi-occupied Paris; Paula is a fellow musician and Lilian’s pregnant mistress, while Simon is their conductor, armed with a gun. The hypnotist assures Lilian that she is cured and refuses payment, but Lilian accuses her of making an antisemitic joke.

Leaving Paula's burial when Simon notices her, Lilian listens to their sessions, recalling that Paula feared her daughter would kill her if she learned Simon was not her biological father. Lilian confides in Gabriel during a drunken night together, refusing to believe Paula was suicidal. Her suspicions that Valérie murdered her mother grow as she is harassed by anonymous phone calls, her car is vandalized, and her office is ransacked, with the disk of Paula's final session missing.

After an unhelpful visit to the police, Lilian realizes Simon may have murdered Paula. Valérie explains that Paula recently received a sizable inheritance from her late aunt Pearl, now shared between Valérie and Simon. Lilian and Gabriel discover Paula's prescription was doctored, and it was Simon who brought it to the pharmacy. They intercept a package that reveals Simon ordered a women's hair iron after Paula's death, and Lilian steals records to learn more about Pearl.

When the hypnotist refuses to see her, Lilian seeks out her own former psychiatrist, who suggests she is driven by guilt for breaking protocol to prescribe Paula's pills. Lilian relives her hypnotic vision, with Pearl as a wealthy patron and Julien as a member of the Milice; in the dream, Simon shoots Paula before Lilian is told to flee to Chérence. Awakening from her trance, Lilian drives to Chérence, where she sees Simon living with another woman, and steals a hairbrush from their trash.

At dinner with Julien, Lilian tells Gabriel that she believes Simon killed Pearl and then Paula to secure the inheritance. Troubled to see his parents have reunited, Julien is further upset when Lilian drunkenly interprets her hypnotic vision. Gabriel drives Lilian to Chérence, posing as a stranded motorist to distract Simon while Lilian searches for the missing disk in vain. Interrupted by his lover's young son, Lilian uses the hypnotist's techniques to convince him that he is dreaming. She escapes with Gabriel, agreeing that they are better off as friends.

Pierre admits he was behind the anonymous calls and vandalism, and broke into Lilian's office to steal his own disks, but she declines to press charges. She returns home to find Simon, who declares her responsible for Paula's death and leaves her the missing minidisc, refusing to explain if he, Valérie, or Paula herself stole it. Listening to their final session, Lilian realizes Paula altered her own prescription and used the medication to poison Pearl. Stricken with guilt, Paula wrote the message as a confession before taking her own life.

Reconciling with Julien, Lilian remains close with Gabriel. She rebuilds her office but no longer records sessions with her patients, including Pierre, instead committed to truly listening.

== Cast ==
- Jodie Foster as Lilian Steiner
- Daniel Auteuil as Gabriel Haddad
- Virginie Efira as Paula Cohen-Solal
- Mathieu Amalric as Simon Cohen-Solal
- Vincent Lacoste as Julien Haddad-Park
- Park Ji-min as Vanessa Haddad-Park
- Luàna Bajrami as Valérie Cohen-Solal
- Frederick Wiseman as Dr. Goldstein
- Sophie Guillemin as Jessica Grangé, l'hypnotiseuse
- Noam Morgensztern as Pierre Hallan
- Aurora Clément as Perle Friedman

== Production ==
Rebecca Zlotowski co-wrote the film with Anne Berest and Gaëlle Macé. Frederic Jouve of Les Films Velvet serves as the producer.

The cast is led by Jodie Foster, Daniel Auteuil, and Virginie Efira. Principal photography took place in Paris and Normandy, starting on 30 September 2024 and concluding on 22 November 2024.

== Release ==
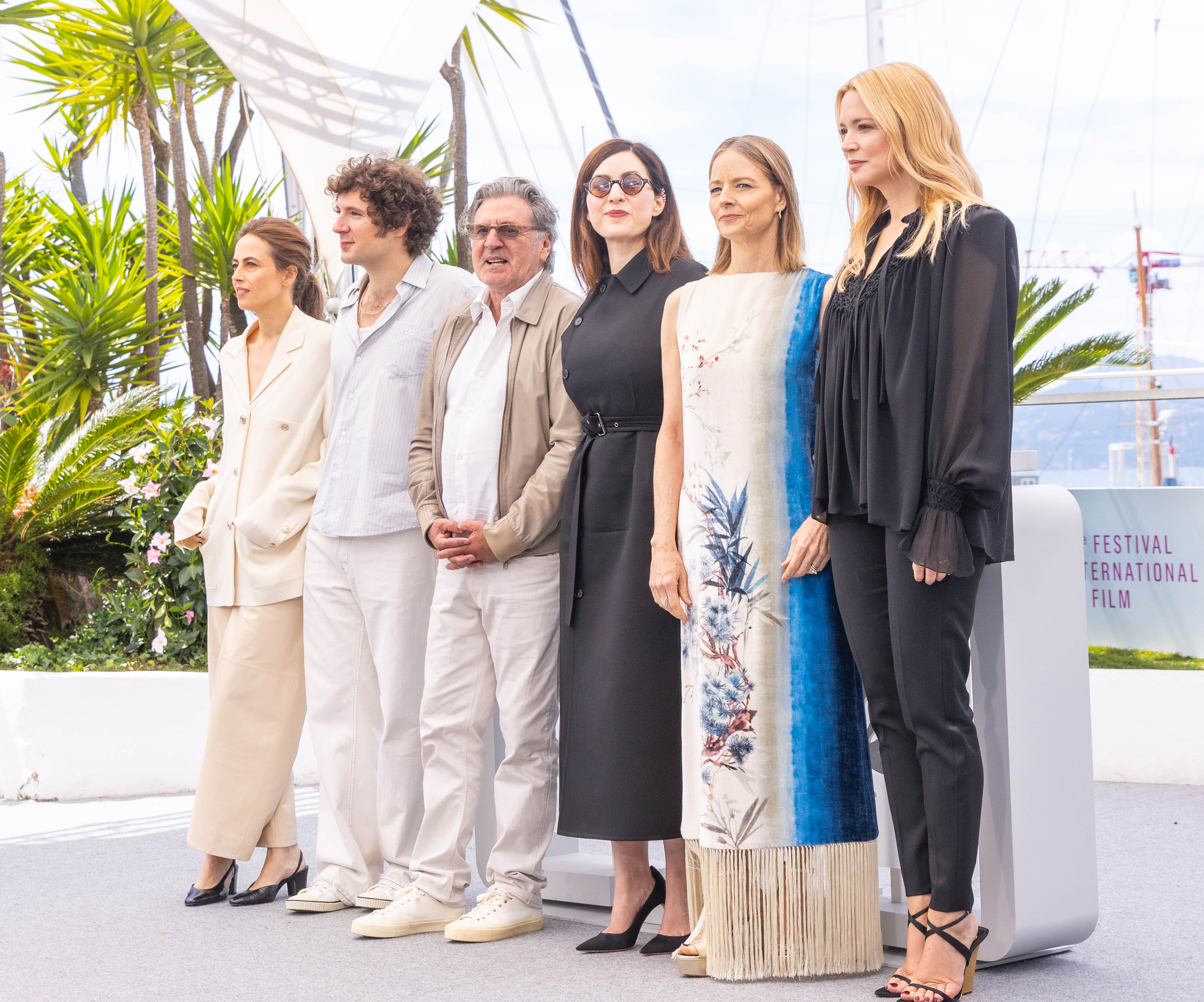
The cast and crew at the film's Cannes premiere.

In April 2025, Vie privée was announced as part of the Out of Competition lineup at the 2025 Cannes Film Festival, where it had its world premiere on 20 May 2025, receiving a 10-minute standing ovation. It received positive reviews, with Foster's performance receiving wide praise. It was also showcased at the 53rd Norwegian International Film Festival in Main the section on 16 August 2025. The film had its North American premiere at the 2025 Toronto International Film Festival on 9 September 2025.

The film was theatrically released in France on 26 November 2025, by Ad Vitam. In February 2025, Sony Pictures Classics acquired North American and Latin American distribution rights. It premiered on 16 January 2026 in the United States after a one-week qualifying run in December 2025. The film also screened at the Toronto International Film Festival and New York Film Festival.

== Reception ==
=== Critical reception ===
On the review aggregator website Rotten Tomatoes, 82% of 146 critics' reviews are positive. The website's consensus reads: "A Private Life mixes Hitchcockian suspense, glossy aesthetics, and a playful streak of camp into an entertaining if somewhat slight mystery that's held together by Jodie Foster's captivating presence." On Metacritic, the film has a weighted average score of 67 out of 100, based on 27 critics, which the site labels as "generally favorable" reviews.

=== Accolades ===
Award	Date of ceremony	Category	Nominee(s)	Result	Ref.
AARP Movies for Grownups Awards	January 10, 2026	Best Actress	Jodie Foster	Nominated	
Lumière Awards	18 January 2026	Best Actress	Jodie Foster	Nominated	
Lumière Awards	18 January 2026	Best Music	Robin Rob Coudert	Nominated	
