= Jordan van den Berg =

South African football player (born 2002)

No. 96 – Chicago Bears
- Position: Defensive tackle
- Roster status: Active

Personal information
- Born: April 12, 2002 (age 24); Johannesburg, South Africa
- Listed height: 6 ft 3 in (1.91 m)
- Listed weight: 310 lb (141 kg)

Career information
- High school: Providence Christian Academy (Lilburn, Georgia, U.S.)
- College: Iowa Western (2020–2021); Penn State (2021–2023); Georgia Tech (2024–2025)
- NFL draft: 2026: 6th round, 213th overall pick

Career history
- Chicago Bears (2026–present)

Awards and highlights
- First-team All-ACC (2025); NJCAA first-team All-American (2020); Second-team All-ACC (2024)

Career NFL statistics as of Week 4, 2026
- Tackles: 1
- Stats at Pro Football Reference

Jordan van den Berg (born April 12, 2002) is a South African professional football defensive tackle for the Chicago Bears of the National Football League (NFL). He played college football for the Iowa Western Reivers, Penn State Nittany Lions and Georgia Tech Yellow Jackets. Van den Berg was selected by the Bears in the sixth round of the 2026 NFL draft.

== Early life ==
Van den Berg was born on April 12, 2002, in Johannesburg, South Africa. His grandmother, Joan Rocci, was a national record-setting swimmer, while his grandfather, Francoise, was a competitive bodybuilder. Growing up in South Africa, he played rugby and cricket. His family moved to the U.S. when he was ten. After moving to the U.S., van den Berg played basketball and baseball but his parents initially opposed the idea of him playing football, only allowing him to start when he was a high school sophomore.

Van den Berg played three years for the football team at Providence Christian Academy in Lilburn, Georgia, breaking a record for most career tackles. After having been a wide receiver in his first year, he gained 40 pounds (18 kg) and switched to linebacker the next season. He was named team defensive MVP as a junior and senior, first-team all-region as a junior and senior, and both all-state and the Region 5-A Private's Defensive Player of the Year in his senior year after totaling 157 tackles. Despite his performance, van den Berg was a zero-star prospect and received little attention as a college recruit. He walked-on to play college football at Iowa Western Community College in 2020.

== College career ==
Van den Berg played his only season for Iowa Western in the spring of 2021, as the 2020 season was postponed due to the COVID-19 pandemic. He appeared in six games and helped Iowa Western to a record of 7–1, posting 13 tackles and four tackles-for-loss (TFLs) while being named first-team junior college All-American and first-team All-Iowa Community College Athletic Conference (ICCAC). His play at Iowa Western drew interest from several major colleges, and later in 2021 he transferred to the Penn State Nittany Lions. After having been a defensive end in junior college, he became a defensive tackle for Penn State and appeared in four games before redshirting during the fall 2021 season, recording two TFLs and a sack.

In his second year at Penn State, van den Berg appeared in 13 games, recording nine tackles, 1.5 TFLs and 1.5 sacks. He then had 11 tackles and 0.5 TFLs in the 2023 season. During his time at Penn State, he earned selection to The Athletic's "freaks" list, highlighting the most athletic college football players, as he was able to bench press 455 pounds (206 kg), back-squat 690 pounds (310 kg), run the 40-yard dash in 4.74 seconds while being able to vertical jump 31 inches (79 cm). Van den Berg graduated from Penn State in December 2023 but had remaining eligibility and transferred to the Georgia Tech Yellow Jackets in 2024.

At Georgia Tech, van den Berg appeared in 13 games, seven as a starter, during the 2024 season, posting 23 tackles, 5.0 TFLs and a sack while being named second-team All-Atlantic Coast Conference (ACC). In his final season, 2025, he was selected first-team All-ACC after recording 44 tackles, 11 TFLs and three sacks in 13 games, all starts. He was Georgia Tech's team leader in TFLs.

== Professional career ==
Pre-draft measurables
Height	Weight	Arm length	Hand span	Wingspan	40-yard dash	10-yard split	20-yard split	20-yard shuttle	Vertical jump	Broad jump	Bench press
6 ft 3 1/4 in (1.91 m)	310 lb (141 kg)	32 1/8 in (0.82 m)	9 3/8 in (0.24 m)	6 ft 5 in (1.96 m)	4.94 s	1.61 s	2.75 s	4.19 s	36.0 in (0.91 m)	9 ft 11 in (3.02 m)	35 reps
All values from Pro Day

Van den Berg was drafted by the Chicago Bears in the sixth round with the 213th overall pick of the 2026 NFL draft. He signed his rookie contract on May 8.
