= Lamar Lussi Athletic Complex =

High school athletic complex in Lilburn, Georgia

The Lamar Lussi Athletic Complex
- "the Lussi"
- Interactive map of The Lamar Lussi Athletic Complex
- Address: 4525 Wynne Russell Dr NW, Lilburn, GA 30047
- Location: Lilburn, Georgia
- Coordinates: 33.9029°N 84.1347°W
- Owner: Providence Christian Academy (Lilburn, Georgia)
- Type: Multi-Sport Athletic Complex
- Surface: Fieldturf
- Acreage: 11 Acres

Construction
- Groundbreaking: May 15, 2015
- Built: 2015-2016
- Opened: 2016 (estimated)
- Cost: $4.5 Million

Tenant
- Providence Christian Academy Storm

Website
- http://www.buildthelussi.com/

The Lamar Lussi Athletic Complex, also called "the Lussi," is a multi-sport high school athletic complex in Lilburn, Georgia. It is the future home of the Providence Christian Academy Storm Football, Soccer, Softball, Track & Field, and Tennis teams. It is named after the Providence Director of Encouragement Lamar Lussi, who had faithfully served the school for more than 30 years before his passing on November 12, 2024.

== Project timeline ==
- The complex was announced on November 30, 2012, at halftime, during the Storm Varsity Boys game against Our Lady of Mercy. It was also announced that the complex would be named for Lamar Lussi.
- Ground was broken on May 18, 2015 and work began on drainage, retention, and leveling.
- In August, September, and October, retention walls were built and concrete was poured for the track and field.
- In November and December, the Fieldturf multi-purpose field was installed along with the pouring of asphalt for the tennis courts and the construction of the dugouts and net posts for the softball field.

== Project components ==
The Complex includes:

- A state of the art Fieldturf multi-purpose field for use by Soccer and Football.
- An eight-lane track surrounding the field with pits for field events.
- A full-size Softball field with dugouts and nets.
- 3 Tennis Courts.
- Additional parking for athletic events.
- A concession stand for food, drinks, and snacks sold during sport events.
