= Three Times Nothing =

2022 Canadian-French comedy film

- French: Trois fois rien
- Directed by: Nadège Loiseau
- Written by: Nadège Loiseau; Niels Rahou
- Produced by: Toufik Ayadi; Christophe Barral; Serge Noël
- Starring: Antoine Bertrand; Philippe Rebbot; Côme Levin
- Cinematography: Julien Meurice
- Edited by: Christophe Pinel
- Production companies: Srab Films; Possibles Média; France 2 Cinéma
- Distributed by: La Pacte
- Release date: January 18, 2022 (L'Alpe d'Huez)
- Running time: 94 minutes
- Countries: Canada; France
- Language: French
- Budget: $2.6 million
- Box office: $505.000

Three Times Nothing (French: Trois fois rien) is a Canadian-French comedy film, directed by Nadège Loiseau and released in 2022. The film centres on Brindille (Antoine Bertrand), Casquette (Philippe Rebbot) and La Flèche (Côme Levin), three homeless men who unexpectedly win the lottery, and struggle to figure out how to claim their winnings without a permanent address.

== Cast ==
- Antoine Bertrand : Nicolas Grenier
- Philippe Rebbot : Casquette
- Côme Levin : Francis Courtebez
- Émilie Caen : Nadia
- Nadège Beausson-Diagne : Vénus
- Bruno Moynot : The neighbor
- Firmine Richard : The ambassad employee
- Karin Viard : The raclette lady

== Production ==
The film premiered in January 2022 at the L'Alpe d'Huez Film Festival, before going into commercial release in March.
