= The Price of Success (2017 film) =

2017 film

- Film poster
- Directed by: Teddy Lussi-Modeste
- Written by: Teddy Lussi-Modeste
- Produced by: Jean-Christophe Reymond; Amaury Ovise
- Starring: Tahar Rahim
- Cinematography: Julien Poupard
- Edited by: Julien Lacheray
- Music by: Robin Coudert
- Distributed by: Ad Vitam Distribution
- Release dates: 24 August 2017 (Angoulême); 30 August 2017 (France)
- Running time: 92 minutes
- Country: France
- Language: French

The Price of Success (French: Le prix du succès) is a 2017 French drama film directed by Teddy Lussi-Modeste. It was screened in the Special Presentations section at the 2017 Toronto International Film Festival.

== Cast ==
- Tahar Rahim as Brahim
- Roschdy Zem as Mourad
- Maïwenn as Linda
- Grégoire Colin as Hervé
- Ali Marhyar as Lenny
- Camille Lellouche as Camille
- Saida Bekkouche as Wassila
- Meriem Serbah as Inès
- Salma Lahmer as Meriem
- Kader Kada as Kader
- Malika Birèche as Malika
- Hocine Choutri as Hocine
- Steve Tientcheu as Doumams
- Akim Chir as Walid
- Abdelkader Hogguy as Mehdi
