= Tom Kirby (politician) =

American politician (born 1961)

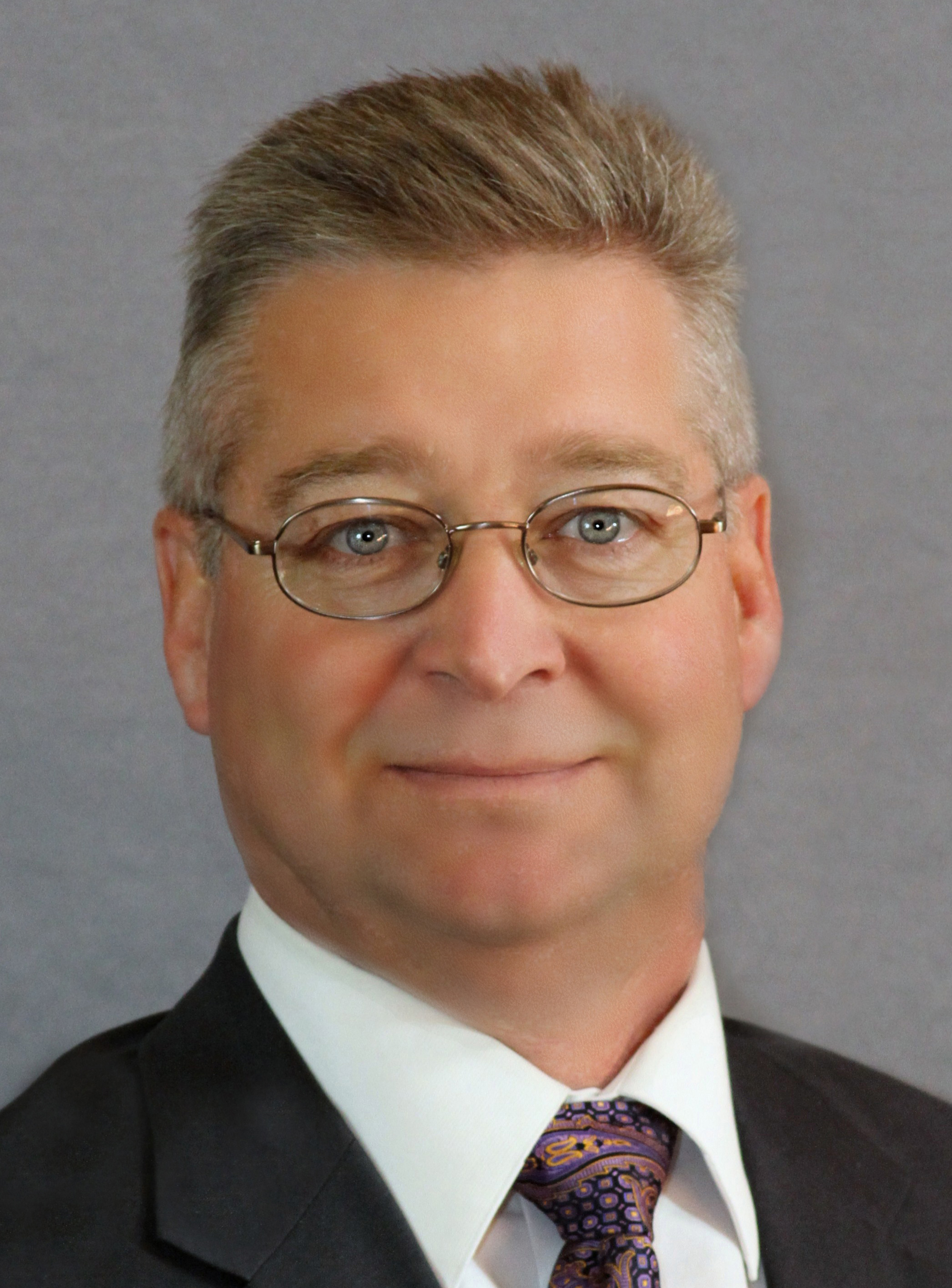

Member of the Georgia House of Representatives
- In office March 12, 2012 – January 9, 2023
- Preceded by: Len Walker
- Succeeded by: Reynaldo Martinez (Redistricting)
- Constituency: 107th District (2012–2013); 114th District (2013–2023)

Personal details
- Born: Lester Thomas Kirby; February 16, 1961 (age 65)
- Party: Republican
- Spouse: Rosemary
- Occupation: Politician

Lester Thomas Kirby (born February 16, 1961) is an American politician. He is a former member of the Georgia House of Representatives from the 114th District, serving from 2013 to 2023. Kirby represented the 107th district from 2012 to 2013. He has sponsored 150 bills. He previously ran for the United States House of Representatives in Georgia's 7th congressional district in 2010. Kirby is a member of the Republican party.

Georgia House of Representatives
Preceded by Len Walker	Member of the Georgia House of Representatives from the 107th district 2012–2013	Succeeded by David Casas
Preceded by Keith Heard	Member of the Georgia House of Representatives from the 114th district 2013–2023	Succeeded by Tim Fleming
