= Brett Harrell =

American politician

Mayor of Snellville, Georgia
- In office 2000–2003

Member of the Georgia House of Representatives from the 106th district
- In office January 10, 2011 – January 11, 2021
- Preceded by: Melvin Everson
- Succeeded by: Rebecca Mitchell

Personal details
- Born: July 1, 1961 (age 65) Georgia, United States
- Party: Republican
- Occupation: Politician

Brett Harrell (born July 1, 1961) is an American former politician from Georgia. Harrell was a Republican member of the Georgia House of Representatives from the 106th District, serving from 2011 to 2021. Harrell sponsored 206 bills. Harrell served as the mayor of Snellville, Georgia, from 2000 to 2003.
