= Soo Hong =

American politician

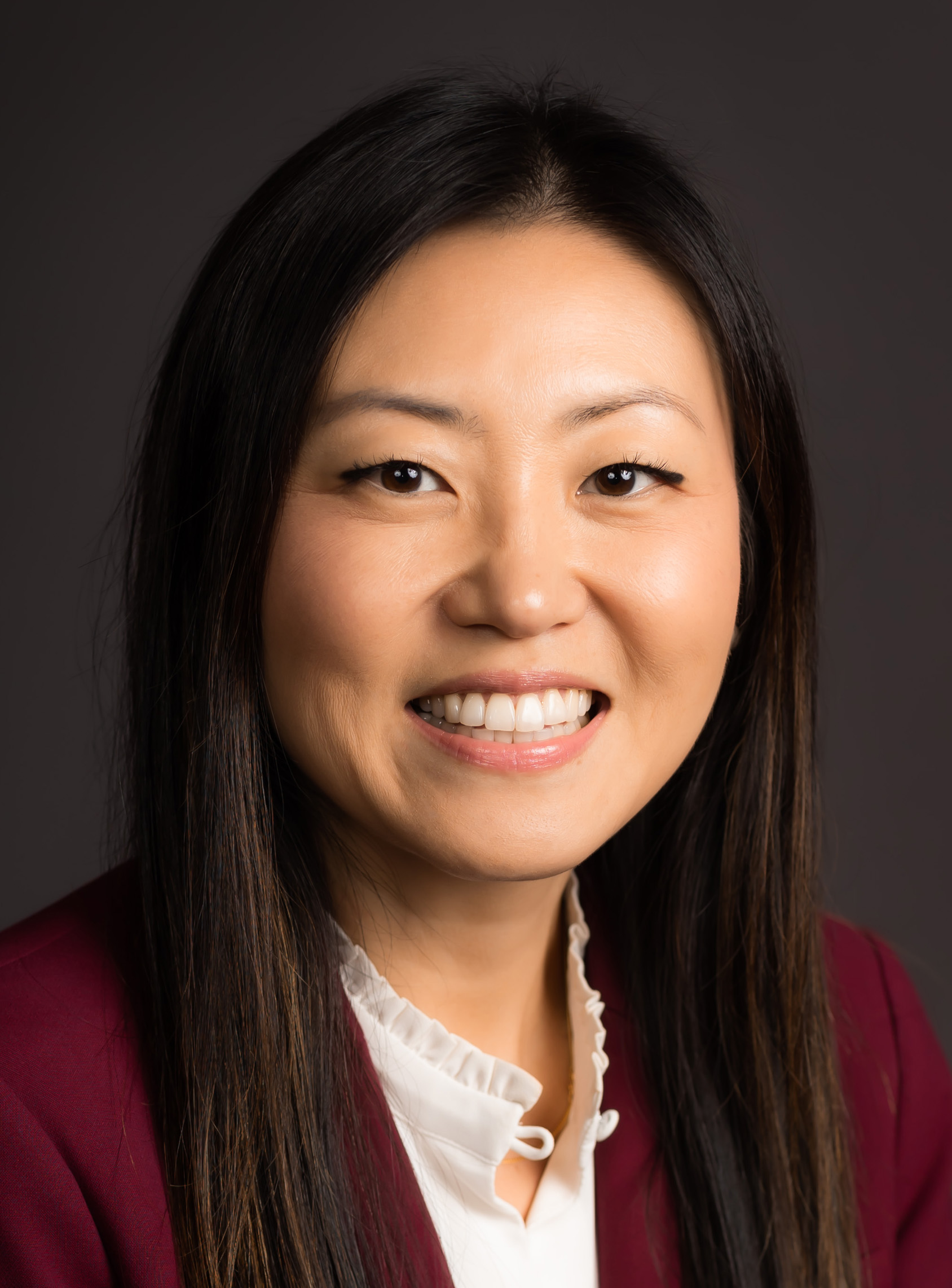
- Official portrait, 2023

Member of the Georgia House of Representatives from the 103rd district
- Incumbent
- Assumed office January 9, 2023
- Preceded by: Constituency established

Personal details
- Born: Seoul, South Korea
- Party: Republican
- Education: Georgia Tech; Mercer Law School (JD)
- Occupation: Attorney, politician

Soo Jung Hong is an American politician and lawyer who is a member of the Georgia House of Representatives, representing the 103rd district. Her district comprises parts of Gwinnett County and Hall County. In addition to serving in the General Assembly, Hong is also a partner at a law firm, Blevins & Hong. She is the first woman of Korean descent to serve in the House.

== Career ==
After college, she interned at the Georgia State Capitol.

== Tenure ==
At the beginning of Hong's first term, Governor Brian Kemp named her one of his legislative floor leaders in the House.

== Elections ==
Hong ran in the 2020 Georgia House of Representatives election in the 102nd district and narrowly lost to Democratic incumbent Gregg Kennard. Hong ran again in 2022, this time in the 103rd district following redistricting. Hong won the Republican primary unopposed, and in the general election, Hong defeated Democrat Ernie Anaya with 61% of the vote in the 2022 Georgia House of Representatives election. She was re-elected in the 2024 Georgia House of Representatives election.

== Personal life ==
At the age of 10, Hong immigrated to the United States with her family from South Korea. She grew up in Cobb County, and attended Georgia Tech and Mercer Law School.

Georgia House of Representatives
Preceded by Timothy Barr	Member of the Georgia House of Representatives from the 103rd district 2023–Present	Incumbent
