= Georgia's 70th House of Representatives district =

State district in Georgia, USA

Georgia's 70th State House of Representatives district
Representative
Lynn Smith; R–Newnan
- Demographics: 67.2% White; 21.2% Black; 6.2% Hispanic; 2.3% Asian
- Population: 58,565

District 70 elects one member of the Georgia House of Representatives. It contains parts of Carroll County and Coweta County.

== Members ==
- Lynn Smith (since 2005)
