= Friendzone (film) =

- Official release poster
- Directed by: Charles Van Tieghem
- Written by: Stanislas Carré de Malberg; Charles Van Tieghem
- Produced by: Clément Birnbaum Joachim Nahum
- Starring: Mickaël Lumière; Manon Azem; Fadily Camara; Eva Danino; Constance Arnoult
- Cinematography: Pierre Dejon
- Edited by: Justine Haouy
- Production company: Nabi Films
- Distributed by: Netflix
- Release date: 29 September 2021
- Running time: 88 minutes
- Country: France
- Language: French

Friendzone is a 2021 French romantic comedy film directed by Charles Van Tieghem; written by Stanislas Carré de Malberg and Charles Van Tieghem; and starring Mickaël Lumière, Manon Azem, Fadily Camara, Eva Danino and Constance Arnoult. It was released on 29 September 2021 by Netflix.

== Plot ==
Pediatric nurse Thibault "Titi" always gets quickly friendzoned by women he’s interested in. On holiday with his three best friends for a bachelorette party, during their last night, he stumbles across Rose.

Recently broken up with her boyfriend, there are sparks between Rose and Titi. They grow closer together, later going on nights out, watching films and giving Rose foot rubs. He takes too long to tell Rose how he feels, and she shows signs of being too comfortable with him.

Convinced that he’s in the friend zone, his three closest friends set out to help him win her affections. They believe he should become a new more mysterious man.

Titi tells Rose he’s going abroad for some weeks volunteering so his girlfriends can coach him. Maud, an independent banker who unapologetically embraces her sexuality, builds his stamina and fitness by running. Goofy Lulu, Titi’s co-worker, teaches him to dance. Alexandra, the sweet girl next door type, gives him advice on communicating more masculinely.

At the end of his ‘training’, Titi successfully gets social influencer Jenni’s number. Feeling he’s ready, they plan to expose Rose to the new-and improved Titi at her baby clothes design show, but he finds she’s back with her troublesome ex-boyfriend Bruno. While Rose is in the back, Bruno shamelessly hits on Maud who he had hit on five years ago, but to no avail as she still prefers women.

Crushed, Titi goes home in a daze. He looks through his phone, calling Jenni. He’s honest to her, but in a sexy way which convinces her. She throws herself at him.

The next day, Titi introduces Jennifer to his friends. They had just been gossiping about the couple’s escapade in the hospital, as well as Bruno harassing Maud with talk of his penis size.

Jennifer monopolises all of Titi’s time. He is expected to be her photographer as well as not being able to spend time with his friends. Rose tries to contact him, only knowing about him through Jenni’s social media.

Jenni's demandingness becomes trying. Titi is woken from a tranquil dream with Rose by her snapping flash photos of them. At work Rose pays him a surprise visit, but he’s rude and she leaves upset. Lulu and the rest of the group propose hatching the plan to get rid of Bruno.

Titi apologizes to Rose, inviting her and Bruno to Jennifer’s party. Maud is to seduce Bruno and show Rose the pictures. Alex asks Rose to take something to Titi’s room. Lulu distracts Jenni so Titi can follow and show her some of the dance moves he’s learned.

On their way downstairs to rejoin the party, Titi and Rose see Bruno showing Maud his penis. Upset, Rose leaves and Titi comforts her, but when he tries to kiss her she accuses him of just trying to get sex. Rejected and dejected, Titi returns to an irate Jenni, breaks up with her, so she beats him up.

Confronting his friends, Titi chews them out for meddling. He points out that Maud is a hypocrite for criticising when she doesn’t have long-term relationships, Lulu for being irresponsible and Alex for naïvely trying to make everything fit into her idea of a perfect world. Reminding them they changed him, he stomps off.

Titi doesn’t talk to his friends for awhile, until Lulu reaches out on their lunch break. Later, she tells him Alex’s pregnant. Going down to meet them all, apologies are given all around.

Alex tells Titi Rose is moving to Spain tomorrow. Initially not responsive, seeing one of his young patient’s with her boyfriend inspires him. Running out of the hospital, he’s hit by an ambulance. His life flashes before his eyes and he wakes up in a hospital bed. Realing he has little time, he has his crew get him to Rose’s.

As Rose won’t let him in, he declares his love for her from atop of her moving van. Promising to be upfront with her from now on, she lets him in. Months later, he has a quick video call with his crew from a beach in Barcelona. Rose gets topless to get Titi into the water he then takes off his shorts and picks Rose up and starts going further in the water

== Cast ==
- Mickaël Lumière as Thibault
- Manon Azem as Maud
- Fadily Camara as Lulu
- Eva Danino as Rose
- Constance Arnoult as Alexandra
- Nada Belka as La Patiente
- Jordan Tortorello as Titi (voice)
- Eloïse Valli as Jennifer Paoli
