= Manon Azem =

French actress (born 1990)

- Born: Manon Alia Azem; 12 October 1990 (age 36); 12th arrondissement, Paris, France
- Education: Cours Florent
- Occupation: Actress

Manon Alia Azem (born 12 October 1990) is a French actress. On television, she is known for her roles in the Disney Channel series Trop la Classe! (2006–2010), the TF1 series Section de recherches (2006), the Phineas and Ferb series (2007–2015; 2025–present), the Netflix series Détox (2022), and the Amazon Prime drama Fifteen-Love (2023). Her films include Gangsterdam (2017).

As a dubbing artist, Azem has performed as the French voice of Debby Ryan and Emma Watson from 2001 to 2015, including in the Harry Potter films, and the French voice for Candace Flynn in the Disney Channel series "Phineas and Ferb".

== Early life ==
Azem was born in the 12th arrondissement of Paris. Her father is of Palestinian origin and worked as a set decorator and key grip at the Théâtre national de la Colline in Paris, while her mother is actress Laurence Jeanneret. After obtaining her baccalaureate, Azem studied at the Cours Florent.

== Career ==
Azem's first dubbing role was that of Tildy in the Disney cartoon Danny le petit mouton noir (So Dear to My Heart), when she was 7 years old.

In 2001 she dubbed the voice of actress Emma Watson in the role of Hermione Granger in the film Harry Potter and the Philosopher's Stone, going on to become the official French voice in all the Harry Potter films until 2015, when she decided her voice had become too deep to portray the British actress. However, in 2021, she reprised her role and dubbed Watson's lines in the documentary Harry Potter 20th Anniversary: Return to Hogwarts, and in August 2022, dubbed Watson's voice in an advertisement for Paradoxe perfume by Prada.

She is also the French voice of Debby Ryan in Jessie and Joy Lauren in Desperate Housewives.

For six seasons, Azem played Dunk, one of the main characters in the Disney Channel series Trop la Classe. She is also known for her role as Officer Sara Casanova in the TF1 series Section de recherches.

In 2017 Azem had a leading role in the film Gangsterdam by Romain Levy, alongside Kev Adams and Côme Levin.

In 2018, she dubbed the character Taelia in the video game World of Warcraft: Battle for Azeroth.

In 2022, she played a leading role in the Netflix series Détox.

In 2023, she played Khalida Lapthorn in the British drama television series Fifteen-Love alongside Ella Lily Hyland and Aidan Turner. It was released on Amazon Prime Video.

== Personal life ==
Azem, whose paternal family are Palestinian, has spoken about what she called "the racism, harassment, and apartheid Palestinians face", even if they hold Israeli passports. In 2024, she reported receiving death and rape threats for defending the Palestinian cause.
