= Georgia's 106th House of Representatives district =

American legislative district

Georgia's 106th State House of Representatives district
Representative
| Akbar Ali; D |

Georgia's 106th House district elects one member of the Georgia House of Representatives. Its representative for the 2021–22 session was Rebecca Mitchell.

== Elected representatives ==
| Representative | Party | Years of service | Hometown | Notes |
|---|---|---|---|---|
| Brett Harrell | Republican | January 10, 2011 – January 11, 2021 | Snellville | |
| Rebecca Mitchell | Democrat | January 11, 2021 | Snellville | |
| Shelly Hutchinson | Democrat | 2023–2025 | 2023–2025 | |
| Akbar Ali | Democrat | 2025 | | |
