= Les Cadeaux =

French Christmas comedy film

- Theatrical release poster
- Directed by: Raphaële Moussafir; Christophe Offenstein
- Written by: Raphaële Moussafir; Stéphane Kazandjian
- Produced by: Antoine Gandaubert; Fabrice Goldstein; Antoine Rein
- Starring: Chantal Lauby; Gérard Darmon; Camille Lellouche
- Cinematography: Christophe Offenstein
- Edited by: Samuel Danési
- Music by: Astrid Gomez-Montoya; Rebecca Delannet
- Production companies: France 3 Cinéma; Karé Productions; Marvelous Productions
- Distributed by: Warner Bros. Pictures
- Release date: 25 December 2024
- Running time: 84 minutes
- Country: France
- Language: French
- Box office: $905,588

Les Cadeaux is a 2024 French Christmas comedy film directed by Raphaële Moussafir and Christophe Offenstein.

The film was released on 25 December 2024 by Warner Bros. Pictures.

== Plot ==
The film follows four generations of the Jewish-French Stain family as they attempt to navigate the pressures of the festive season, set two days before Christmas. The ritual of giving and receiving gifts is the central catalyst for conflict that is displayed, unveiling the long-held tensions and complex dynamics within the family.

The film's structure is a choral comedy, which combines the storylines of many of the characters. The members of the Stain family are seen trying to procure the perfect present, but their efforts are derailed by bizarre ideas, clumsiness, and emotional overload. The plot explores, with dark humor and benevolence, the neurosis of the films' characters, such as the father's hypochondria and the role of a therapist.

The film's main premise is that the gifts, intended to be a source of pleasure and connection, can instead be a source of "unspeakable suffering" and a potential "missile wrapped in floral paper," revealing painful truths and ultimately changing the way the characters view one another.

== Cast ==
- Chantal Lauby as Françoise Stein
- Gérard Darmon as Michel Stein
- Camille Lellouche as Charlotte Stein
- Max Boublil as Jérôme Stein
- Mélanie Doutey as Julie
- Vanessa Guide as Océane
- Gringe as Adrien

== Reception ==
Critical reception was generally negative.
