= Robin Coudert =

French musician and composer (born 1978)

- Born: 15 May 1978 (age 48); Caen, France
- Other name: Rob
- Occupations: Singer-songwriter, composer
- Years active: 1998–present

Robin Coudert (born 15 May 1978), also known by his stage name ROB, is a French pop/rock musician, singer-songwriter, producer and film score composer.

== Life and career ==
Born in Caen, Robin Coudert, alias ROB, is a musician, author, singer, composer, producer. He began learning music with the classical trumpet at the age of 8, and continued his instruction with the synthesizer and the piano, and thus created his first electronic compositions at the age of 10.

Rob discovered performing with a heavy-metal band at 14, then a funk band at 16.

Along with his musical experiences, he entered the Beaux-Arts in Paris in 1996, where he joined the studio of the painter Vladimir Velickovic.

However, it was the Source label that spotted Rob, presented by his friends from the band Phoenix. In 1998, he participated in the Source Rocks compilation, from which his first EP, "Musique pour un enfant jouet", was extracted. In 2001, Source released his first album "Don't Kill", followed by "Satyred Love" in 2002. During the production of these, he met the sound engineer Jack Lahana, with whom he continued for all of his works.

Rob then began a series of collaborations: with Sébastien Tellier or Phoenix, whom he will accompany on stage on keyboards and percussion since then.

He then produced / directed albums for various artists, Melissa Mars (2007), Zaza Fournier (2008 and 2011), Alizée (2010), Adanowsky (2010) or Leon Larregui (2016)…

In 2010, with the Institubes label, he created the “Dodecalogue” project, a series of 12 instrumental discs devoted to the Gospels. The work will be left unfinished in the sixth volume with the closing of Institubes.

His cinematographic experience began in 2005 with the short film "Pink Cowboy Boots" by Maria Larrea, which he married that same year, and has been actively pursued since 2010.

Rob creates the original music for "Belle Épine" by Rebecca Zlotowski (2010), "Populaire" by Régis Roinsard (2012) nominated for the Césars for best original music, "Maniac" by Franck Khalfoun (2012), "Made In France" by Nicolas Boukhrief (2015), “Revenge” by Coralie Fargeat (2018)… In 2015 he began his collaboration with Éric Rochant on “Le Bureau des Légendes”, for which he created the original music for the five seasons, until 2020.

His career continues to continue in cinema, series and documentaries with more than 30 original music composed to date.

The Parisian studio Hippocampus, created with Jack Lahana, houses all of his productions.

== Discography ==
=== Singles ===
- "Musique pour un enfant jouet" (1999)
- "Amours" (2000)
- "Power glove" (2001)

=== Albums ===
- Don't kill (2001)
- Satyred love (2002)

=== EPs ===
- Dodécalogue Vol I : Pierre (2009)
- Dodécalogue Vol II : Jean (2009)
- Dodécalogue Vol III : Jacques Le Majeur (2009)
- Dodécalogue Vol IV : Jude Thadée (2009)
- Dodécalogue Vol V : Matthieu (2010)
- Dodécalogue Vol VI : Philippe (2010)

== Other work ==
=== Musical compositions ===
- 2010 : for French singer Alizée – three songs on the album Une enfant du siècle.

=== Art director / producer ===
- 2007 - Album « À la recherche de l’amour perdu » by Melissa Mars (Polydor)
- 2008 - Album « La vie à deux » by Zaza Fournier (Warner)
- 2010 - Album « Un enfant du siècle » by Alizée (Sony)
- 2010 - Album « Amador » by Adanowsky (Emi)
- 2011 - Album « Regarde-moi » by Zaza Fournier (Warner)
- 2013 - Album « Cute kid » by Junesex (Jia)
- 2016 - Album « Voluma » by Leon Larregui – Disque de Platine (Universal)

=== Original soundtracks ===
- Pink Cowboy Boots by Maria Larrea (Short Film – 2005)
- Belle Épine by Rebecca Zlotowski (2010)
- Jimmy Rivière by Teddy Lussi-Modeste (2011)
- Radiostars by Romain Lévy (2012)
- Populaire by Régis Roinsard (2012)
- Maniac by Franck Khalfoun (2012)
- Je suis un supporter du standard by Riton Liebman (2013)
- Rock the Casbah by Laïla Marrakchi (2013)
- Grand Central by Rebecca Zlotowski (2013)
- Every Secret Thing by Amy J. Berg (2014)
- Tristesse Club by Vincent Mariette (2014)
- Horns by Alexandre Aja (2014)
- The Bureau, 1st season by Eric Rochant (2015)
- Made in France by Nicolas Boukhrief (2015)
- Enragés by Eric Hannezot (2015)
- Down by love by Pierre Godeau (2016)
- Planetarium by Rebecca Zlotowski (2016)
- Amityville: The Awakening by Franck Khalfoun (2016)
- Beautiful Accident by Wi Ding Ho (2016)
- The Bureau, 2nd season by Eric Rochant (2016)
- Sarah Winchester, ópera fantôme - 3ème scène, by Bertrand Bonello (2016)
- Et les Mistrals Gagnants by Anne-Dauphine Julliand (Documentary – 2017)
- Seuls by David Moreau (2017)
- The Bureau, 3rd season by Eric Rochant (2017)
- Un Ciel Radieux by Nicolas Boukhrief (2017)
- Le Prix du Succès by Teddy Lussi-Modeste (2017)
- Feroce by Izu Troin (2017)
- Gangsterdam by Romain Lévy (2017)
- Revenge by Coralie Fargeat (2018)
- Campfire Creepers by Alexandre Aja (2018)
- Troy: Fall of a city, by David Farr (2018)
- The Bureau, 4th season by Eric Rochant (2017)
- Cities of Last Things by Ho Wi Ding (2018)
- Le Plus Beau Pays du Monde, by Frédéric Fougea (2019)
- Papicha, by Mounia Meddour (2019)
- Trois Jours et Une Vie, by Nicolas Boukhrief (2019)
- Les sauvages, by Rebecca Zlotowski (2019)
- Gretel & Hansel by Oz Perkins (2020)
- Run Sweetheart Run, by Shana Feste (2020)
- Oxygène, by Alexandre Aja (2021)
- Never Let Go, by Alexandre Aja (2024)
- The Spiral, by Paolo Strippoli (2026)

=== Remix ===
- Produced a Remix of the title "Playground love" by Air . It is available on the maxi-single "Playground love".

== Honors ==
=== Nomination ===
- 2013 - Césars : nomination for the César Award for Best Music Written for a Film for Populaire
- 2017 - Prix Lumière: Nominated for the Lumière Award for Best Music for Planetarium
- 2017 - Festival de la fiction TV de la Rochelle: Awarded for best music for Un Ciel Radieux
- 2017 - Lauriers de la Radio et de la Télévision: Awarded for the original music of an audiovisual work for Un Ciel Radieux
- 2018 - Prix UCMF (Union des Compositeurs de Musique de Film - Union of Film Music Composers): Awarded for the best original music of an audiovisual work for Un Ciel Radieux
