= Radiostars =

- Film poster
- Directed by: Romain Levy
- Written by: Romain Levy; Mathieu Oullion
- Produced by: Alain Attal
- Starring: Manu Payet; Clovis Cornillac
- Cinematography: Laurent Tangy
- Edited by: Stéphan Couturier
- Music by: Robin Coudert
- Production companies: Les Productions du Trésor; Mars Films; Chaocorp et Picseyes
- Distributed by: Mars Films
- Release dates: 20 January 2012 (L'Alpe d'Huez); 11 April 2012 (France)
- Running time: 100 minutes
- Country: France
- Language: French
- Budget: $6 million
- Box office: $4.5 million

Radiostars is a 2012 French comedy film co-written and directed by Romain Levy.

== Plot ==
Having failed to break into show business in New York as a comedian, Ben returns to Paris with his unaccomplished dream. He meets Alex, the star presenterr of the Blast FM flagship radio show, the "Breakfast Club". Soon, Ben joins the team formed by Alex, Cyril and Arnold, and together they travel the roads of France to meet and win over the listeners to their radio show once again.

== Cast ==
- Manu Payet as Alex
- Clovis Cornillac as Arnold
- Douglas Attal as Ben
- Pascal Demolon as Cyril
- Benjamin Lavernhe as Smiters
- Côme Levin as Jérémy
- Zita Hanrot as Jennifer
- Sam Karmann as J.R. Jablonski
- Jacky Ido as Léonard de Vitry
- Ana Girardot as Sabrina
- Laurent Bateau as Frédérico
- Alice Belaïdi as Nassima
- Juliette Plumecocq-Mech as Daniel(le)
- Anthony Sonigo as Bastien
- Mona Walravens as Sonia
- Marie Lenoir as Marie
- Pom Klementieff as The Pizza Girl
