= Providence Christian Academy (Lilburn, Georgia) =

Private school in Lilburn, Georgia

Location
- 4575 Lawrenceville Highway; Lilburn, Gwinnett, Georgia; United States; 33°54′03″N 84°08′05″W

Information
- Type: Non-denominational Christian school
- Motto: "Providing excellence in Christ-centered education as an extension of the Christian home."
- Established: 1991
- Principal: Lisa Tilly (Johns Creek campus) and Terri West (Lilburn campus), high school; Connie Adams, elementary; Rachel Gillespie, “assistant” middle
- Headmaster: Jason Harrison
- Grades: K–12
- Campus size: 46 acres
- Colors: Navy, red, and grey
- Athletics: GHSA
- Mascot: Storm
- Rivals: Hebron Christian Academy Greater Atlanta Christian Schools, and Woodward
- Accreditation: Southern Association of Colleges and Schools, Association of Christian Schools International
- Region: GHSA Region 8-A
- Athletic Director: Sean West
- Website: www.providencechristianacademy.org

Providence Christian Academy is a private, college preparatory, non-denominational Christian school offering classes from kindergarten to 12th grade. It is located in Lilburn, Georgia, United States. Founded in 1991, Providence has graduated over 1200 students. Providence is not affiliated with any specific church or denomination, and students, faculty, and staff come from a variety of religious backgrounds.

== History ==
Providence opened on September 6, 1991, with an enrollment of just 354 students in K-12th grade. The school occupied two-thirds of a strip shopping center, and all the desks, furniture, and computers were donated. The class of 1992, the first senior class, named the school "Providence".

During its first six years Providence grew by 50 students each year, and in 1993 purchased the building it was in and expanded into the entire building. By 2007, Providence had over 800 students.

In 2011, the school added football and the iProv initiative, which issued iPads to students in 7th-12th grades, and the school changed its mascot from the "Stars" to the "Storm". In 2013, the school announced the construction of the Lamar Lussi Athletic Complex, a multi-sport complex named in honor of PCA Director of Encouragement Lamar Lussi. It was scheduled to be completed in early 2016.

== Athletics ==
Providence Athletics have won a total of five state championships:

- Girls' soccer: 1999
- Softball: 2000
- Girls' soccer: 2007
- Gymnastics: 2009
- Baseball: 2011

== Notable alumni ==
- John Crist, comedian known for his work creating comedy sketch videos for BuzzFeed, and having opened for Jeff Foxworthy, Dave Chappelle, and Seth Meyers
- Andy Hull, lead singer of the indie rock band Manchester Orchestra
- Collin McHugh, MLB pitcher, 2017 World Series Champion (New York Mets, Colorado Rockies, Houston Astros, Tampa Bay Rays, Atlanta Braves)
- Bailey Moody, American wheelchair basketball player
- Jordan van den Berg, NFL defensive tackle for the Chicago Bears
- Garrett Whitlock, MLB pitcher for the Boston Red Sox
