= An Easy Girl =

2019 film by Rebecca Zlotowski

- Theatrical release poster
- French: Une fille facile
- Directed by: Rebecca Zlotowski
- Written by: Rebecca Zlotowski; Teddy Lussi-Modeste
- Produced by: Frédéric Jouve
- Starring: Mina Farid; Zahia Dehar; Benoît Magimel; Clotilde Courau; Nuno Lopes; Loubna Abidar; "Riley" Lakdhar Dridi; Henri-Noël Tabary
- Cinematography: George Lechaptois
- Edited by: Géraldine Mangenot
- Production companies: Les Films Velvet; France 3 Cinéma
- Distributed by: Ad Vitam
- Release dates: 20 May 2019 (Cannes); 28 August 2019 (France)
- Running time: 92 minutes
- Country: France
- Language: French
- Budget: €2.7 million
- Box office: $644,582

An Easy Girl (French: Une fille facile) is a 2019 French comedy-drama film directed by Rebecca Zlotowski, who co-wrote the screenplay with Teddy Lussi-Modeste. It stars Mina Farid, Zahia Dehar, Benoît Magimel, Clotilde Courau and Nuno Lopes. Set in summertime in Cannes, the film follows a 16-year-old girl who is drawn into her visiting cousin's free-spirited lifestyle, despite warnings from her concerned best friend. It had its world premiere in the Directors' Fortnight section of the 2019 Cannes Film Festival, where it won the SACD Award for Best French-language Film.

== Plot ==
Naïma is a naive high school student who lives with her mother in a modest apartment in Cannes and has recently celebrated her 16th birthday. While figuring out her future, she is due to start a summer internship as a chef in the kitchen of the upscale hotel where her mother works as a chambermaid, but she is still unsure about it. She also plans to audition for a school play alongside her gay best friend and classmate Dodo, an aspiring actor.

Naïma's voluptuous 22-year-old cousin Sofia arrives unexpectedly from Paris to spend the summer holidays with her. Naïma finds herself intrigued by Sofia's free-spirited lifestyle, and Sofia becomes a mentor to Naïma, sharing some of her cynical and hedonistic views on life and relationships, including her rejection of romantic love in favour of sensations and adventures. As a birthday gift, Sofia gives Naïma a baby-pink Chanel handbag to match her own.

At a nightclub, Naïma and Sofia meet two older men: Andrès, a wealthy Brazilian businessman and art collector, and his French friend and assistant Philippe, who invite the girls onto their yacht that is docked at the marina, with Dodo tagging along. When Dodo's friends loudly call out to him outside the yacht, Sofia and Stewart, a staff member, both demand that he send his friends away. Dodo argues with Sofia, accusing her of using her body for material gain, before leaving with his friends. Sofia and Andrès flirt with each other and retreat to his cabin. Later, Naïma wanders through the yacht and witnesses Sofia and Andrès having sex, though Sofia remains indifferent.

The next morning, the cousins go to a high-end boutique and buy expensive items on Andrès's tab. One night, Naïma goes to a tattoo studio and gets the same "carpe diem" lower-back tattoo as Sofia's. On the day of her scheduled audition with Dodo, Naïma instead joins Sofia, Andrès and Philippe on a yacht trip to Italy, where they have lunch at the villa of Calypso, Philippe's wealthy friend. Sofia impresses Calypso with her knowledge of the literary works of Marguerite Duras, before Calypso makes an offhand remark about Sofia's plastic surgery. Naïma develops an unlikely friendship with Philippe, and on the trip back to Cannes, he kindly rejects her advances.

That night, Andrès accuses the cousins of stealing a valuable antique sextant and has Stewart throw them out of the yacht. Naïma insists that they prove their innocence, but Sofia tells her to leave her alone and walks away. Philippe observes Andrès placing the sextant back into its box, appalled at his behaviour, but Andrès is nonchalant. Naïma finds Dodo at a nightclub, and he initially rebuffs her, but they quickly make peace as he reveals that he has passed his audition. Returning home in the morning, Naïma finds that Sofia has left without telling her. Before Philippe departs, Naïma goes to say goodbye to him; he assures her that he knows that she is not a thief and tells her that she has "tremendous value".

Naïma receives an email from Sofia saying she has moved to London and is happy. Three months later, Naïma is now training to become a chef. She decides to sell the expensive items she had purchased with Sofia, but keeps her Chanel bag as a souvenir.

== Cast ==
- Mina Farid as Naïma
- Zahia Dehar as Sofia
- Benoît Magimel as Philippe
- Nuno Lopes as Andrès
- Clotilde Courau as Calypso
- Loubna Abidar as Dounia, Naïma's mother
- "Riley" Lakdhar Dridi as Dodo
- Henri-Noël Tabary as Stewart

== Production ==
=== Development ===
Rebecca Zlotowski drew inspiration from an article written in the first person about two young women who spent time with married men on a yacht on the French Riviera; the men would lavish the women with gifts and dinner in exchange for their company. Zlotowski, who had long been intrigued by Zahia Dehar, cast her to star in the film after she liked one of Zlotowski's Instagram posts. Zlotowski wrote the screenplay in three weeks.

=== Filming ===
Principal photography took place in Cannes. Scenes where also shot at the Domaine du Rayol in Rayol-Canadel-sur-Mer in July 2018 over two days, where the poster was photographed.

== Reception ==
The film was released on Netflix in the United States on 14 August 2020, and was the 10th most watched film on the platform on its debut weekend.

On the review aggregator website Rotten Tomatoes, the film holds an approval rating of 95% based on 22 reviews, with an average rating of 7.3/10. Metacritic, which uses a weighted average, assigned the film a score of 79 out of 100, based on reviews from 9 critics, indicating "generally favorable" reviews.
