= Georgia's 103rd House of Representatives district =

American legislative district

Georgia's 103rd State House of Representatives district
Representative
Soo Hong; R–Lawrenceville
- Demographics: 72.1% White; 8.8% Black; 11.8% Hispanic; 5.3% Asian.2% Other
- Population (2010): 56,584

Georgia's 103rd House of Representatives district elects one member of the Georgia House of Representatives. Its current representative is Republican Soo Hong.

The district contains parts of Gwinnett and Hall counties.

== Elected representatives ==
Representative	Party	Years of service	Hometown	Notes
Lynn Smith	Republican	1997–2003	Newnan	
David Casas	Republican	2003–2013	Lilburn	
Timothy Barr	Republican	2013–2023	Lawrenceville	
Soo Hong	Republican	2023–present	Lawrenceville	
