= SMS (2014 film) =

- Theatrical release poster
- Directed by: Gabriel Julien-Laferrière
- Written by: Laurent Bénégui; Gabriel Julien-Laferrière
- Produced by: Alain Attal
- Starring: Guillaume de Tonquédec; Anne Marivin; Franck Dubosc; Géraldine Pailhas
- Cinematography: Axel Cosnefroy
- Edited by: Stéphan Couturier
- Production company: Trésor Films
- Distributed by: Warner Bros. Pictures
- Release date: 20 August 2014
- Running time: 84 minutes
- Country: France
- Language: French
- Budget: €7.9 million
- Box office: $2.2 million

SMS is a 2014 French comedy film directed by Gabriel Julien-Laferrière.

== Cast ==
- Guillaume de Tonquédec as Laurent Demange
- Anne Marivin as Nathalie
- Franck Dubosc as Vincent Demange
- Géraldine Pailhas as Stéphane
- Julien Boisselier as Simon Bartelli
- Philippe Lefebvre as Sampieri
- Timothé Vom Dorp as Milo
- Naidra Ayadi as Leila
- Oleg Kupchik as Fedor
- Vinciane Millereau as Liquasse
- Côme Levin as Kevin
