= Section de recherches =

French television series

- Also known as: Research unit
- Genre: Crime drama
- Created by: Steven Bawol; Dominique Lancelot
- Starring: Xavier Deluc; Virginia Caliari; Kamel Belghazi; Chrystelle Labaude; Linda Hardy; Jean-Pascal Lacoste; Félicité Du Jeu; Bernard Montiel; Vincent Primault; Olivia Lancelot; Franck Sémonin; Manon Azem; Julie Fournier; Stéphane Soo Mongo; Felicite Chaton; Julie Bernard; Raphaël Bouchard; Marine Sainsily; Honorine Magnier
- Country of origin: France
- Original language: French
- No. of seasons: 13
- No. of episodes: 155 (list of episodes)

Production
- Production locations: Bordeaux, France (seasons 1–7); Nice, France (season 8–); Paris, France
- Running time: 52 minutes

Original release
- Network: TF1
- Release: May 11, 2006

Section de recherches ("Investigation Unit") is a French television series first broadcast on TF1 on May 11, 2006.

In Belgium, the series was shown on La Une from November 9, 2013.

== Plot ==
The Investigation Unit is a special unit of the National Gendarmerie, responsible for the most complex cases. In Bordeaux (from 2006 to 2013) and then in Nice (from 2014), it investigates child abductions, disappearances, and vicious or sexual crimes. In search of witnesses, the team is empowered to extend its investigations beyond the borders of France.

== Development ==
Since the series was developed at the same time as another TF1 police show, "R.I.S, police scientifique", the production team made the two differ by portraying gendarmes outside of Paris, in Bordeaux, to present different scenery. The series has a deliberate focus on interpersonal relationships, inspired by American series such as "Cold Case" and "Without a Trace".

The show runner Dominique Lancelot is both producer and screenwriter. The series is one of the few French productions to be written using the writing room process commonly employed by American TV shows: the writers work in two groups to produce two storylines at a time and meet several days a week to work together. One of the writers is then designated to write the step outline, and another to write the dialogue. Each storyline thus passes through several hands before receiving the approval of the show runner for the shoot. The series is therefore in continuous production, with each episode being shot as soon as it is finalised, a style quite rare for French series which are more typically filmed in whole seasons. Each episode has a budget of €900,000, plus a €100,000 fee payable to the Centre national du cinéma et de l'image animée (the National Centre for Cinema and the Moving Image), and therefore totals one million euros per episode.

In 2013, following the seventh season, the production team decided to make a number of changes to the show, including moving the police unit from Bordeaux to Nice. Both technical and creative factors were cited as prompting the changes: the writers wanted to develop the serial format of the show, with an increasing focus on the characters' personal lives; and the occasional inclement weather in the Gironde region had been creating difficulties in filming some of the show's many outdoor scenes. Production schedules benefitted from the milder climate and longer days in the Alpes-Maritimes.

The show was commissioned by TF1 for a tenth series to be broadcast in 2016, but underwent a major upheaval when producer Dominique Lancelot stepped down from her role as show runner and was replaced by Marie Guilmineau (The Shadow Men). at the end of the ninth series.

== Casting ==
In 2008, Linda Hardy joined the cast of the third season as Chief Warrant Officer Claire Linsky. She decides to leave at the end of next season series in 2010 to focus on his family.

In 2011, two new characters appeared in the fifth season: Warrant Officer Fanny Caradec played by Félicité Du Jeu and Officer Marc-Olivier Delcroix played by Vincent Primault.

The seventh season saw many casting changes. Félicité Du Jeu left the series due to pregnancy. Kamel Belghazi also left the series in mid-season. Manon Azem joined the show shortly after in the role of Warrant Officer Sarah Casanova.

In 2013, the relocation of the series from Bordeaux to Nice for the eighth season led to many changes in the cast: except for Xavier Deluc and Chrystelle Labaude and Manon Azem, all the other actors (Jean-Pascal Lacoste, Virginia Caliari and Olivia Lancelot) were written out. Additions included: Franck Sémonin in the role of Lieutenant Lucas Auriol and Julie Fournier in lieutenant Roxane Janin. Stéphane Soo Mongo also joined as Warrant Officer Alexandre Sainte-Rose and Félicité Chaton as Warrant Officer Victoire Cabral. Finally, Manon Azem returned to the cast in the fifth episode of the eighth season.

== Cast ==
Character	Actor	Position	Seasons												
Character	Actor	Position	1	2	3	4	5	6	7	8	9	10	11	12	13
Martin Bernier	Xavier Deluc	Major	Main	Main	Main	Main	Main	Main	Main	Main	Main	Main	Main	Main	Main
Matilde Delmas	Virginia Caliari	Sergeant	Main	Main	Main	Main	Main	Main	Main						
Enzo Ghemara	Kamel Belghazi	Captain (Seasons 1–5); Commander (Seasons 5–7)	Main	Main	Main	Main	Main	Main	Main						
Nadia Angeli	Chrystelle Labaude	Captain	Main	Main	Main	Main	Main	Main	Main	Main	Main	Main	Main		
Léon	Julien Courbey		Main	Main											
Claire Linsky	Linda Hardy	Chief Sergeant			Main	Main									
Luc Irrandonéa	Jean-Pascal Lacoste	Officer	Recurring	Recurring	Recurring	Main	Main	Main	Main						
Fanny Caradec	Félicité Du Jeu	Sergeant					Main	Main	Main						
Alain Berger	Bernard Montiel	Prosecutor					Main	Main	Main						
Nathalie Charlieu	Olivia Lancelot	Lieutenant	Recurring	Recurring	Recurring	Recurring	Recurring	Main							
Marc-Olivier Delcroix	Vincent Primault	Officer					Recurring	Recurring	Main	Guest	Guest				
Sara Casanova	Manon Azem	Sergeant							Recurring	Main	Main	Main	Main	Guest	Guest
Roxane Janin	Julie Fournier	Lieutenant								Main	Main				
Lucas Auriol	Franck Sémonin	Lieutenant									Main	Main	Main	Main	Main
Alexandre Sainte-Rose	Stéphane Soo Mongo	Sergeant									Main	Main	Main	Main	Main
Victory Cabral	Felicite Chaton	Sergeant									Main	Main	Main	Main	Main
Juliette Delage	Julie Bernard	Lieutenant									Main				
Camille Chatenet	Raphaël Bouchard	Lieutenant										Main	Main	Main	
Sophie Walle	Marine Sainsily	Sergeant												Main	
Ariel Grimaud	Élise Tielrooy	Captain												Main	Main
Rose Orsini	Honorine Magnier	Sergeant												Main	Main

== Episodes ==
For the first seven seasons the set was in Bordeaux and from season 8 onward the set is in Nice.

Series	Episodes	Originally broadcast	
Series	Episodes	Series premiere	Series finale
1	4	11 May 2006	18 May 2006
2	8	6 September 2007	28 September 2007
3	10	20 November 2008	29 January 2009
4	14	10 September 2009	11 March 2010
5	14	10 March 2011	28 April 2011
6	10	26 April 2012	24 May 2012
7	16	28 February 2013	18 April 2013
8	12	27 February 2014	3 April 2014
9	12	5 February 2015	19 March 2015
10	13	28 January 2016	31 March 2016
11	14	5 January 2017	13 April 2017
12	14	1 March 2018	26 April 2018
13	14	7 March 2019	2 May 2019

== Shooting ==
The filming of the first six seasons takes place in Bordeaux and in the Aquitaine region for outdoor scenes and in Paris for indoor scenes.

The filming of episodes 67 and 68: from April 3 to April 20 in Angoulême and around, episodes 69 and 70: from May 22 for 3 weeks in Angoulême and surroundings, episodes 71 and 72: from June 18 for 3 weeks in Angoulême and surroundings and episodes 73 and 74: from September 3 for 3 weeks in Angoulême and the surrounding area.

The filming of the final of the fifth season in La Réunion lasted 24 days.

The shooting of the sixth season begins at the end of February 2011 for an expected duration of nine months.

The shooting of the seventh season is from April to December 2012.

Since the eighth season and the relocation of the series to Nice, production has set up its studios in a former perfumery factory in the Grasse (Alpes-Maritimes) zone. The shooting of the eighth season begins in April 2013 in region.

The filming of the ninth season begins March 24, 2014.

The shooting of the tenth season is planned in two stages: a first part from the end of March 2015, and a second part from the summer until the end of December 2015.

The filming of the eleventh season began in March 2016.

The shooting of the twelfth season began on March 13, 2017.
