= Jimmy Rivière =

- Film poster
- Directed by: Teddy Lussi-Modeste
- Written by: Teddy Lussi-Modeste; Rebecca Zlotowski
- Produced by: Jean-Christophe Reymond
- Starring: Guillaume Gouix; Béatrice Dalle; Hafsia Herzi; Serge Riaboukine
- Cinematography: Claudine Natkin
- Edited by: Albertine Lastera
- Music by: Robin Coudert
- Production company: Kazak Productions
- Distributed by: Pyramide Distribution
- Release date: 16 March 2011
- Running time: 90 minutes
- Country: France
- Language: French
- Budget: $2.4 million
- Box office: $145,000

Jimmy Rivière is a 2011 French drama film directed by Teddy Lussi-Modeste in his feature directorial debut.

== Plot ==
Jimmy Rivière is passionate about Muay Thai. He seeks a possible life where he could reconcile his faith and his love for Sonia, a young Muslim girl, also in love with him. But Jimmy is also a nervous young gypsy in search of ideal and plagued by doubts, who lives in his loosely truck fitted a bed, not far from his family of caravans : his mother and "sister love" married without love. His conversion to Pentecostalism, a very assertive and fundamental branch in Protestantism led him to question himself on his two passions : boxing and Sonia. Indeed, Pentecostals believe that to become a better man, they must renounce to violence and desire. Under pressure from the community, Jimmy applies but is struggling to put in agreement his will and acts. Gina, his boxing coach keeps reminding him that he would find battles to fight and tries to make him back to his sporting passion.

== Cast ==
- Guillaume Gouix as Jimmy Rivière
- Béatrice Dalle as Gina
- Hafsia Herzi as Sonia
- Serge Riaboukine as José
- Pamela Flores as Becka
- Jacky Patrac as Ezechiel
- Canaan Marguerite as Mario
- Nadia Desposito as Thérèse
- Kévin Debar as Kevin
- David Ribeiro as Isaac
- Fanny Touron as Nessie
- Abdoulaye Fofana as Alfa Diallo
- Eye Haïdara as Fatim
- Paul Andrei as Rocky
- Djessé Metbach as John
- Marvin Hospice as Nino
- Clément Chevalier-Bousquet as Clément
- Mayli Flores as Cristal
- Marjorie Jalet as Marjorie
- Stéphanie Lussi as Stéphanie
- Jacques Fieschi as The Prefect

== Accolades ==
Year	Award	Category	Recipient	Result	Ref(s)
2011	Angers Premiers Plans Film Festival	Audience Award - Best French Feature Film	Teddy Lussi-Modeste	Won	
2011	Louis Delluc Prize	Best Debut Film	Teddy Lussi-Modeste	Nominated	
2012	César Awards	César Award for Most Promising Actor	Guillaume Gouix	Nominated	
2012	Lumière Awards	Lumière Award for Most Promising Actor	Guillaume Gouix	Nominated	
