= Fabrice Goldstein =

French film producer (born 1972)

- Born: 25 February 1972 (age 53); Paris, France
- Occupation: Film producer
- Years active: 1999–present

Fabrice Goldstein (born 25 February 1972) is a French film producer.

== Career ==
His film The Names of Love (French: Le Nom des gens) produced by Goldstein, Antoine Rein, and Caroline Adrian was awarded two César Awards in 2011, including Best Actress for Sara Forestier and Best Original Screenplay.

== Filmography ==
=== Features ===
- 2024: Les Cadeaux
- 2023: Bernadette
- 2023: Sage-homme
- 2019: La lutte des classes
- 2017 : Just to Be Sure
- 2017: I Got Life!
- 2016: Juillet août
- 2015: The Very Private Life of Mister Sim
- 2015: I'm All Yours
- 2014: Des lendemains qui chantent
- 2013: Queens of the Ring
- 2012: Du vent dans mes mollets
- 2012: Un jour mon père viendra
- 2010: Djinns
- 2010: Les meilleurs amis du monde
- 2010: The Names of Love
- 2009: Rien de personnel
- 2008: Vilaine
- 2007: Les murs porteurs
- 2007: J'veux pas que tu t'en ailles
- 2004: J'me sens pas belle

=== Shorts ===
- 2013: J'aime beaucoup ta mère
- 2013: La femme qui flottait
- 2011: J'aurais pu être une pute
- 2010: Aglaée
- 2010: La coagulation des jours
- 2008: Arrêt demandé
- 2006: Chair fraîche
- 2006: Le Mozart des pickpockets
- 2006: Du pain et des fraises
- 2006: Le Steak
- 2005: 40 mg d'amour par jour
- 2005: Patiente 69
- 2004: Connaissance du monde (drame psychologique)
- 2004: Le droit chemin
- 2004: Frédérique amoureuse
- 2003: Abîmes
- 2003: Après
- 2003: Le tarif de Dieu
- 2003: Wolfpack
- 2002: Mi-temps
- 2002: Bois ta Suze
- 2002: You Sure?
- 2001: Premier nu
- 1999: Touchez pas à ma poule !
