= Akbar Ali (politician) =

American politician (born 2004)

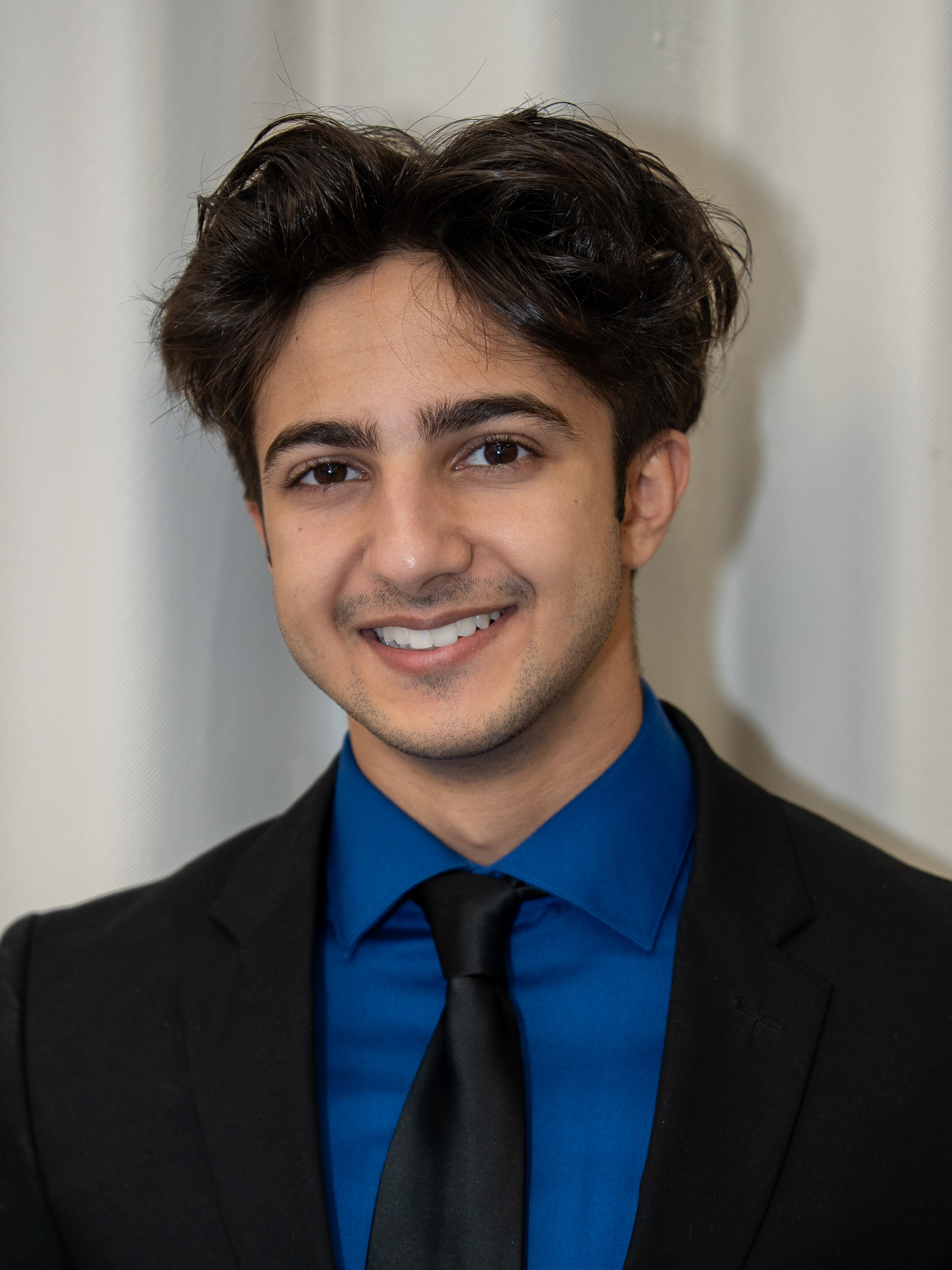

Member of the Georgia House of Representatives from the 106th district
- Incumbent
- Assumed office December 18, 2025
- Preceded by: Shelly Hutchinson

Personal details
- Born: January 29, 2004 (age 22)
- Party: Democratic
- Education: Kennesaw State University
- Website: www.forakbarali.com

Muhammad Akbar Ali (born January 29, 2004) is an American politician who was elected to the Georgia House of Representatives in a special election runoff on December 2, 2025. A member of the Democratic Party, he represents Georgia's 106th district. He previously served as First Vice Chair of the Gwinnett County Democratic Party. He is the youngest elected legislator in Georgia.

== Early political career ==
=== 2025 special election ===
In 2025, Akbar Ali ran against Marqus Cole, a Democratic candidate and local energy nonprofit leader, as well as Jamie Parker, a Republican, for the Georgia House District 106 seat vacated by Shelly Hutchinson upon her resignation. He received endorsements from several state lawmakers, including Roy Barnes, Sam Park, and Hutchinson herself. As no candidate reached over 50% of the vote, the election went to a runoff between Akbar Ali and Marqus Cole, which Ali ultimately won. According to his website, his top campaign priorities included lowering costs, supporting education, and expanding healthcare coverage for low-income Georgians.

Ali was sworn in on December 18, 2025.

== Electoral history ==
Georgia House of Representatives' 106th district special election, 2025
Party	Candidate	Votes	%
Democratic	Marqus Cole	3,171	38.97
Democratic	Akbar Ali	2,611	32.09
Republican	Jamie Parker	2,354	28.93
Total votes		8,136	100.00

Georgia House of Representatives' 106th district special election runoff, 2025
Party	Candidate	Votes	%
Democratic	Akbar Ali	947	54.39
Democratic	Marqus Cole	794	45.61
Total votes		1,741	100.00
