= Gangsterdam =

- Directed by: Romain Lévy
- Written by: Remy Four; Romain Lévy; Mathieu Oullion; Julien War
- Produced by: Alain Attal; Marie Jardillier; Emma Javaux
- Starring: Kev Adams; Manon Azem; Côme Levin; Rutger Hauer
- Cinematography: Léo Hinstin
- Edited by: Thomas Beard
- Music by: Robin Coudert
- Distributed by: Studiocanal
- Release date: 7 March 2017
- Running time: 100 minutes
- Country: France
- Language: French

Gangsterdam is a 2017 French comedy film starring Kev Adams, Manon Azem, Côme Levin and Rutger Hauer.

== Plot ==
A student in Amsterdam tries to win over a young woman by chasing after a packet of drugs, which happens to belong to a Dutch organized crime group.

== Cast ==
- Kev Adams as Ruben Jablonski
- Manon Azem as Nora
- Côme Levin as Durex
- Hubert Koundé as Ulysse Abraham Bakel
- Mona Walravens as June
- Rutger Hauer as Dolph Van Tannen
- Alex Hendrickx as Caspar Van Tannen
- Ido Mosseri as Amos Ben Soussan
- Patrick Timsit as Serge Jablonski
- Manu Payet as Mischka
- Talid Ariss as Jonas Jablonski
- Seno Sever as Souleymane
- Pim Vesters as Invité
