= Shelly Hutchinson =

American politician from Georgia

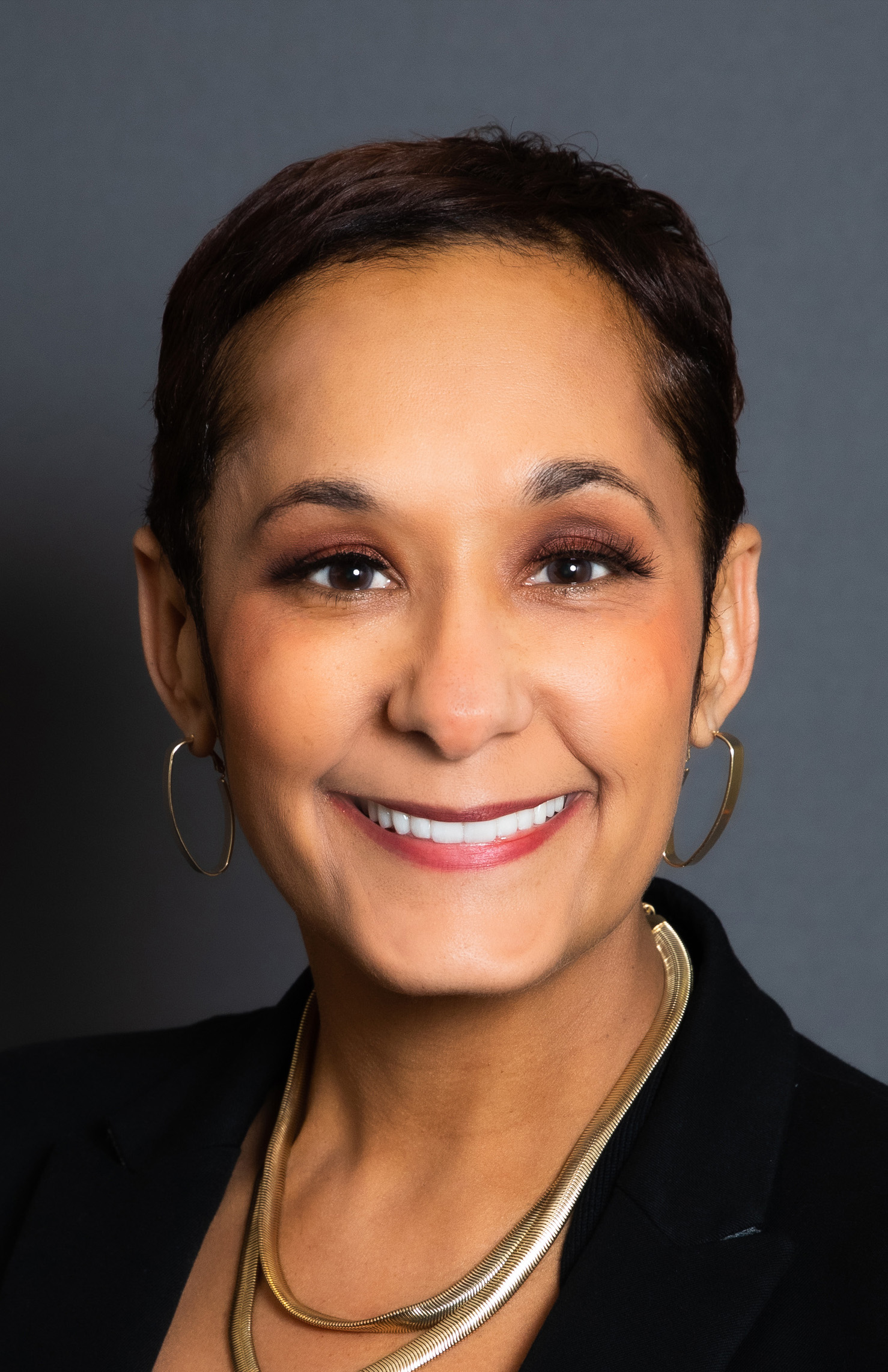

Member of the Georgia House of Representatives
- In office January 14, 2019 – September 4, 2025
- Preceded by: David Casas
- Succeeded by: Akbar Ali
- Constituency: 107th District (2019–2023); 106th District (2023–2025)

Personal details
- Born: December 9, 1971 (age 54) New Orleans
- Party: Democratic
- Education: Louisiana State University, BA University of Georgia, MSW

Rachelle Dinet Hutchinson (born December 9, 1971) is an American politician. A member of the Democratic Party, she served in the Georgia House of Representatives from the 106th District, taking office in January 2019.

== Early life ==
Shelly Hutchinson was born in New Orleans, Louisiana. Hutchinson was raised as a Catholic. She received her bachelor's degree in Criminal Justice from Louisiana State University and her Master's Degree in Social Work from the University of Georgia.

Hutchinson moved to Gwinnett County in 1995. She worked for the Fulton County Division of Family and Child Services before she started her own small business, The Social Empowerment Center.

== Political career ==
In 2018, Hutchinson ran for an open Georgia House of Representative seat in House District 107. During the campaign, she was one of a handful of state legislature candidates in Georgia to be endorsed by former President Barack Obama. She defeated Ken Montano in the Democratic primary and went on to defeat Republican Janet Mihoci in the 2018 midterm general election. Hutchinson is the first member of the Democratic Party to win the district since Nikki Randal in 2002.

In July 2025, Hutchinson announced that she would be resigning in August to care for an ailing family member. Her resignation was later delayed until September.

== Personal life ==
In 1996, she married Edward Hutchinson and later had two children, Rylie and Ellis. Hutchinson is Catholic.

Georgia House of Representatives
Preceded by David Casas	Member of the Georgia House of Representatives from the 107th district 2021–2023	Succeeded by Sam Park
Preceded by Rebecca Mitchell	Member of the Georgia House of Representatives from the 106th district 2023–2025	Vacant
