= Lynn Smith (politician) =

American politician (born 1945)

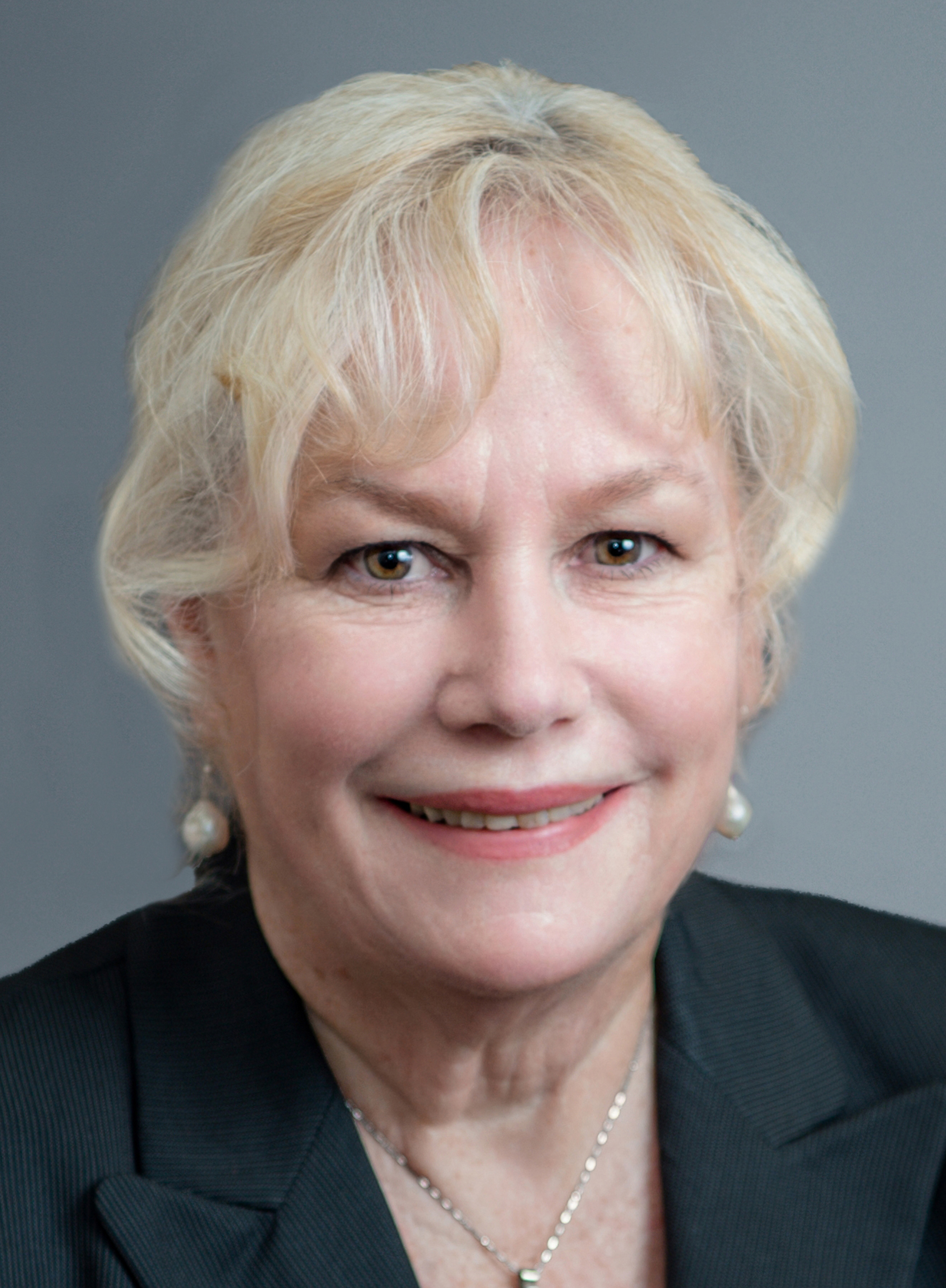

Member of the Georgia House of Representatives
- Incumbent
- Assumed office January 13, 1997
- Preceded by: Donna Staples Brooks
- Constituency: 103rd district (1997–2003); 87th district (2003–2005); 70th district (2005–present)

Personal details
- Born: August 30, 1945 (age 81) Orlando, Florida, U.S.
- Party: Republican

Evelyn Ratigan Smith (born August 30, 1945) is an American former businesswoman, former educator, and current politician from Georgia. Smith is a Republican member of the Georgia House of Representatives since 1997.

== Early life ==
On August 30, 1945, Smith was born in Orlando, Florida.

== Career ==
Smith was a businesswoman and a French and Social Studies teacher at Newnan Schools.

On November 5, 1996, Smith won the election and became a Republican member of Georgia House of Representatives for District 103. Smith defeated Dock H. Davis with 60.13% of the votes. On November 3, 1998, as an incumbent, Smith won the election unopposed and continued serving District 103. On November 7, 2000, as an incumbent, Smith won the election unopposed and continued serving District 103.

On November 5, 2002, Smith won the election unopposed and became a Republican member of Georgia House of Representatives for District 87.

On November 2, 2004, Smith won the election and became a Republican member of Georgia House of Representatives for District 70. On November 3, 2020, as an incumbent, Smith won the election unopposed and continued serving District 70.

== Personal life ==
Smith's husband is Charles. They have two children. Smith and her family live in Newnan, Georgia.

Georgia House of Representatives
Preceded by Donna Staples Brooks	Member of the Georgia House of Representatives from the 103rd district 1997–2003	Succeeded by Jimmy Lord
Preceded by Len Walker	Member of the Georgia House of Representatives from the 87th district 2003–2005	Succeeded by Michele Henson
Preceded by Stan Watson	Member of the Georgia House of Representatives from the 70th district 2005–present	Incumbent
