= Rebecca Mitchell (epidemiologist) =

American politician

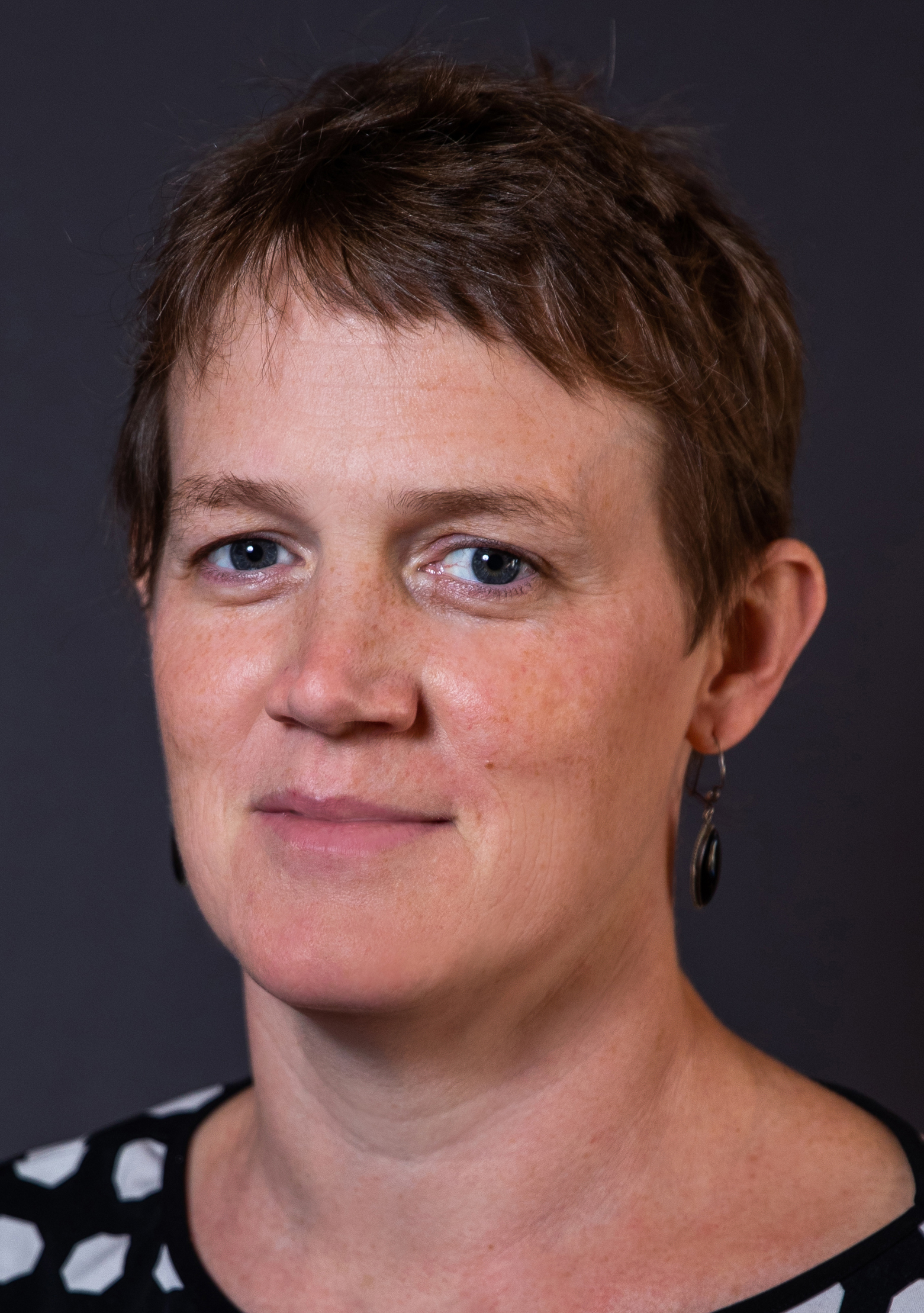

Member of the Georgia House of Representatives from the 106th district
- In office January 11, 2021 – January 9, 2023
- Preceded by: Brett Harrell
- Succeeded by: Shelly Hutchinson

Personal details
- Born: April 22, 1981 (age 45)
- Party: Democratic
- Occupation: Politician

Rebecca Mans Mitchell (born April 22, 1981) is an American epidemiologist, veterinarian, and politician, who served as a member of Georgia House of Representatives for District 106.

== Early life ==
Mitchell grew up in Skaneateles (town), New York. She earned a DVM from New York State College of Veterinary Medicine at Cornell University in 2011, a PhD in Comparative Medical Sciences, in 2011, and an undergraduate degree in biology from Harvard College. For her undergraduate thesis, she researched the biomechanics of growing animals.

Georgia House of Representatives
Preceded by Brett Harrell	Member of the Georgia House of Representatives from the 106th district 2021–2023	Succeeded by Shelly Hutchinson
