= Planetarium (film) =

- Film poster
- Directed by: Rebecca Zlotowski
- Written by: Rebecca Zlotowski; Robin Campillo
- Produced by: Frédéric Jouve
- Starring: Natalie Portman; Lily-Rose Depp; Emmanuel Salinger
- Cinematography: George Lechaptois
- Edited by: Julien Lacheray
- Music by: Robin Coudert
- Production company: Les Films Velvet
- Distributed by: Ad Vitam Distribution (France)
- Release dates: 8 September 2016 (Venice); 16 November 2016 (France)
- Running time: 106 minutes
- Countries: France; Belgium
- Languages: English; French
- Box office: $530,515

Planetarium (released in the UK as The Summoning) is a 2016 French-Belgian drama film directed by Rebecca Zlotowski. Starring Natalie Portman, Lily-Rose Depp and Emmanuel Salinger, it follows two sisters who possess the ability of interacting with the dead, though their lives change forever when they accidentally cross paths with a French film producer. The film had its world premiere at the Venice Film Festival, and was released on 16 November 2016, by Ad Vitam Distribution.

== Plot ==
In the late 1930s, two American sisters, Laura and Kate Barlow, travel to France where they perform séances at cabarets with Laura hosting the session and Kate channeling the spirits. A public performance of theirs is seen by French film producer Andre Korben. Impressed by their act, he books them for a private session and is moved by the spirit that visits him.

Feeling stifled by the lack of innovation in the French film industry, Korben convinces investors and his team to film a séance as it happens. Unfortunately for Korben, the reels look ridiculous. But the director is drawn to Laura, who, despite not being a spiritualist, has a face that photographs well. The film team conceives of a conventional script in which Laura plays a medium who channels the spirit of a widower's wife and the three become locked in a love triangle with the widower unsure if he is falling in love with his former wife or the medium.

Laura and Kate move in with Korben, who is generous and kind to them. However, he continues to hold private séances with Kate, much to Laura's displeasure. (She fears, rightly, that Korben's interest in the spirit world is sexual.) Eventually, Laura is forced to leave for the coast to continue filming. Korben takes Kate to a metaphysical scientist and films their sessions together.

On the coast, Laura realizes that the rise of anti-semitism means the tides are turning against Korben. Rumours that he once performed in porn abound; and someone writes that she is a Jew's whore on her mirror. When Korben and Kate arrive to reunite with Laura, Korben shows his producers and investors the film of him and Kate which shows nothing. The director walks off the film and blames the money Korben has wasted chasing ghosts as an excuse. Meanwhile, Kate falls ill and reveals that she hasn't been faking but really can see ghosts. She believes this is because she is dying. Kate has leukemia, which is a death sentence at the time.

Korben is jailed for his wasted investments and the trial strips him of his French citizenship.

Years later, Kate is dead; and Korben has been sent to a death camp in "the East". Laura runs into Eva, an actress she once knew, who helps her get a part in a film working with her former director. No longer involved with spiritualism or Korben, Laura's film career in Nazi era France is assured.

== Cast ==
- Natalie Portman as Laura Barlow
- Lily-Rose Depp as Kate Barlow
- Emmanuel Salinger as André Korben
- Louis Garrel as Fernand Prouvé
- Amira Casar as Eva Saïd
- Damien Chapelle as Louis
- Pierre Salvadori as André Servier
- David Bennent as Januck
- Benoît Forgeard as Médecin
- Rosa Bursztein as Operator

== Production ==
In May 2015, Natalie Portman and Lily-Rose Depp had been cast in the film as sisters. Rebecca Zlotowski directed the film from a screenplay by her and Robin Campillo, with Frederic Jouve's producing under his Les Films Velvet banner.

Filming began in Paris late September 2015.

== Release ==
Ad Vitam Distribution distributed the film in France. It was screened at the 2016 Toronto International Film Festival.

== Critical response ==
On Rotten Tomatoes, the film has an approval rating of 16%, based on 25 reviews, with an average rating of 4.78/10. The website's consensus reads: "The Summoning (Planetarium) looks out on a constellation of potentially brilliant ideas, but proves fatally unable to find its focus". On Metacritic the film has a score of 44 out of 100, based on 13 critics, indicating "mixed or average reviews".

Owen Gleiberman of Variety gave the film a negative review and wrote: "Planetarium is an inert and slipshod movie — messy and aimless, a period tale told with zero period atmosphere (you have to keep reminding yourself that it’s not taking place in 2016), built around a situation with enough possibilities to make you wish that the director, Rebecca Zlotowski, had taken advantage of at least one of them".
