= Georgia's 107th House of Representatives district =

American legislative district

Georgia's 107th State House of Representatives district
Representative
Shelly Hutchinson; D–Snellville

Georgia's 107th House district elects one member of the Georgia House of Representatives. This district covers a portion of the northeast metropolitan Atlanta area, covering parts of Snellville and Lawrenceville in Gwinnett County. Its current representative is Democrat Shelly Hutchinson. In the 2018 midterm elections, Democrat Shelly Hutchinson defeated Republican Janet Mihochi, and became the district's next representative in January 2019. She is the first Democrat to lead the district in recent years.

== Elected representatives ==
Representative	Party	Years of service	Hometown	Notes
Len Walker	Republican	2005–2011	Loganville	
Tom Kirby	Republican	2012–2013	Lawrenceville	
David Casas	Republican	2017–2019	Lilburn	
Shelly Hutchinson	Democrat	2019–present	Snellville	
