= Côme Levin =

French actor

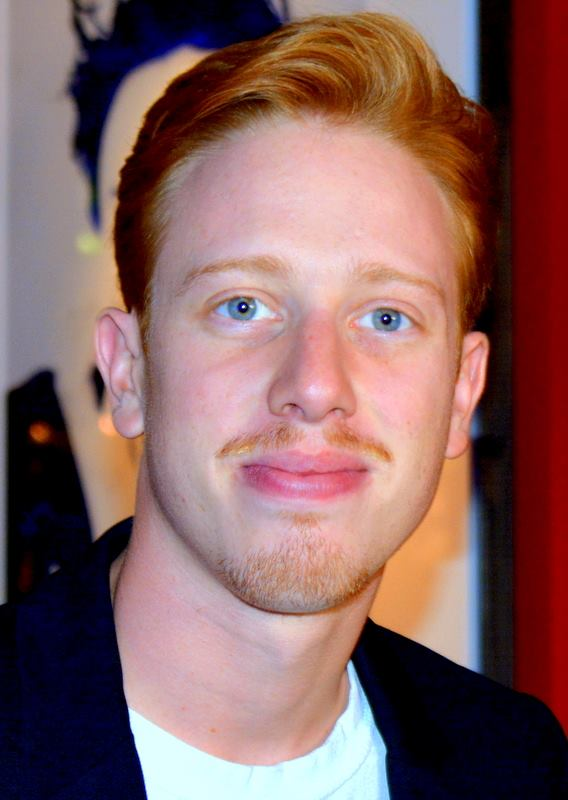
- Born: 11 September 1990 (age 36); Paris, France
- Years active: 2000s–present

Côme Levin (born 11 September 1990) is a French actor.

Following a number of small roles, he first became widely known for his performance as Jérémy in the 2012 comedy film Radiostars, for which he was named to the initial Révélations longlist for the César Award for Most Promising Actor.

== Filmography ==
=== Film ===
Year	Title	Role	Notes
2004	Loser Takes All! (Qui perd gagne !)	Joseph	
2009	The Visit		
2010	Lily Sometimes (Pieds nus sur les limaces)		
2012	Radiostars	Jérémy	
2013	The Family (Malavita)	J.P.	
2013	Pieces of Me (Des morceaux de moi)	Gabin	
2013	Almost Charming (Un prince (presque) charmant)	Seb	
2014	SMS	Kevin	
2016	A Bun in the Oven (Le Petit Locataire)	Damien	
2016	Le Correspondant	Le caïd	
2016	The Fabulous Patars (Cigarettes et Chocolat chaud)		
2016	Five	Pizza deliveryman	
2017	Patients	Eric	
2017	Gangsterdam	Durex	
2020	Papi Sitter	Doudou	
2022	Three Times Nothing (Trois fois rien)	La Flèche	

=== Television ===
Year	Title	Role	Notes
2002	Commissariat Bastille	Ludovic	
2002	Patron sur mesure	Louis-Paul	
2002	PJ	David	
2006–10	Trop la classe!	Nico	
2007–08	Pass the Plate	Himself	Short series; 3 episodes
2008	Vénus et Apollon		
2008	Samantha oups!		
2010	Victoire Bonnot	Thomas	
2011	1788... et demi	Jacques	
2013	Fais pas ci, fais pas ça	Nicolas	
2013	Vive la colo!	Hugo	
2013	Profilage		
2013	Police Log (Main courante)		
2014	Peplum	Josué	
2014	Ceux de 14	Quelo	
2017–19	Missions	Basile Verhoeven	
2018–present	Balthazar	Eddy Drouhot	
2020	Capitaine Marleau	Adjudant Chabert	
