= Killian Hill Christian School =

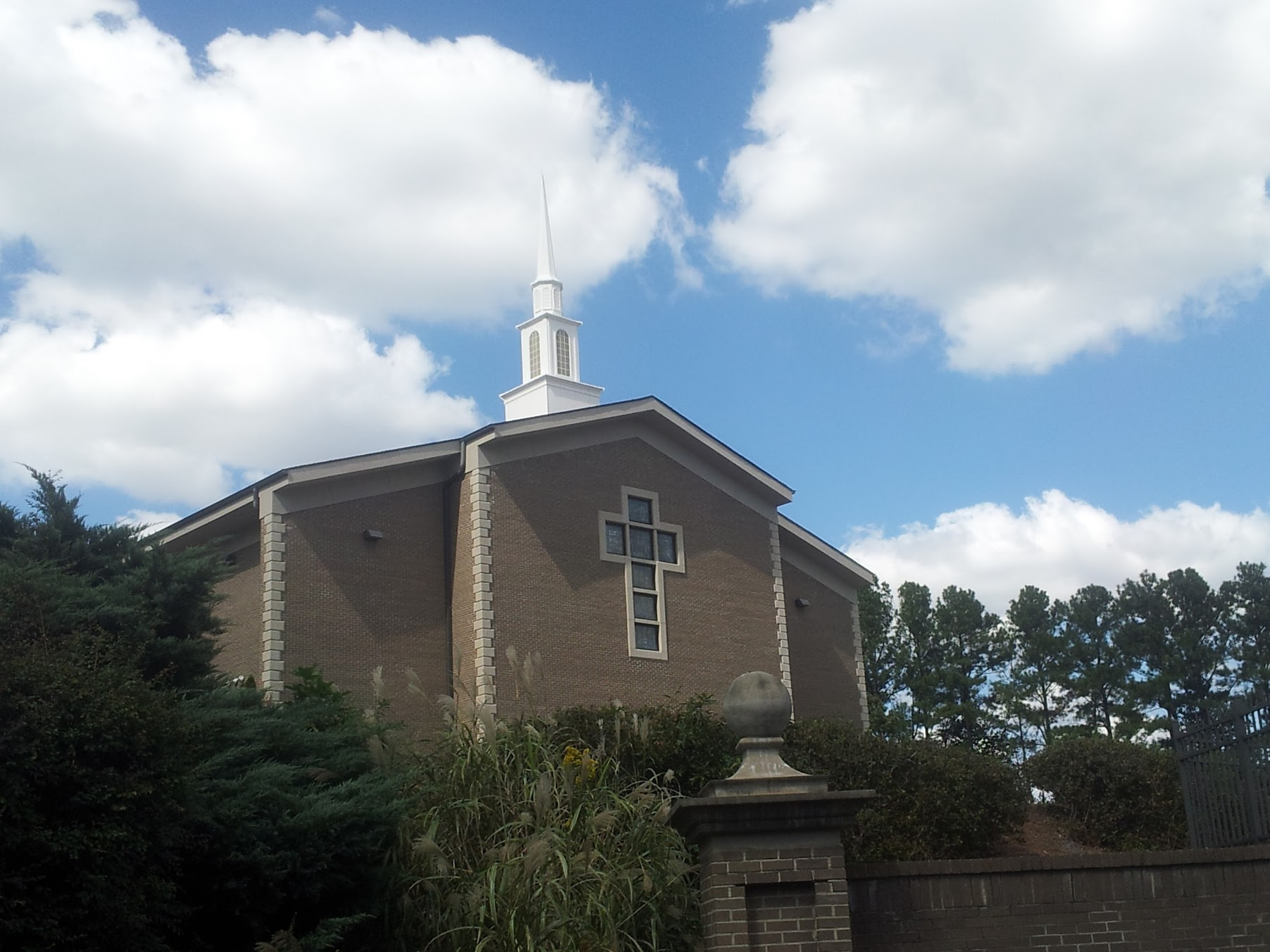

Location
- 151 Arcado Road SW; Lilburn, Georgia 30047-2987; United States; 33.8884°N 84.1141°W

Information
- Type: Private Christian
- Motto: Educating With Purpose
- Established: 1972
- School district: Gwinnett County
- Principal: Dr. Mark Cronemeyer
- Faculty: 42
- Grades: K4 - 12
- Enrollment: 415
- Student to teacher ratio: 14:1
- Colors: Navy Blue and Gold
- Mascot: Cougars
- Nickname: KHCS
- Website: Killian Hill Christian School

Killian Hill Christian School is a private Christian school located in Lilburn, Georgia, United States, that provides K–12 education.

Killian Hill has been ranked in the top 10 for private high school education in the Atlanta area. The school has also earned an A+ rating for diversity.

== History ==
Killian Hill Christian School was established in 1972 as an extension of Killian Hill Baptist Church. The buildings on the property are used for the purposes of both the church and the school.
