= David Casas =

American politician

Member of the Georgia House of Representatives from the 107th district
- In office January 14, 2013 – January 14, 2019
- Preceded by: Tom Kirby
- Succeeded by: Shelly Hutchinson

Member of the Georgia House of Representatives from the 103rd district
- In office January 13, 2003 – January 14, 2013
- Succeeded by: Timothy Barr

Personal details
- Born: September 18, 1971 (age 54) Spain
- Party: Republican
- Occupation: Politician

David S. Casas (born 18 September 1971) is an American politician. He previously served as a member of the Georgia House of Representatives from the 107th District from January 14, 2013 until January 14, 2019. Casas represented the 103rd district from 2003 to 2013. Casas has sponsored 167 bills.

In 2018, Casas chose not to run for reelection. His successor, Shelly Hutchinson, took office on January 14, 2019.
