= Teddy Lussi-Modeste =

French Romani film director, screenwriter and literature teacher

- Born: 25 March 1978 (age 48); Grenoble, France
- Education: La Fémis
- Occupations: Director; screenwriter; teacher
- Years active: 2004–present

Teddy Lussi-Modeste (born 25 March 1978) is a French Romani film director, screenwriter and literature teacher. He wrote and directed the films Jimmy Rivière (2011), The Price of Success (2017), and The Good Teacher (2024).

== Early life ==
Lussi-Modeste grew up in La Tronche, Grenoble, in a Sinti, Manush Romani community in France.

== Career ==
Lussi-Modeste studied cinema at the film school La Fémis in Paris. He later became a literature teacher in high schools and colleges, before devoting himself entirely to cinema in the late 2000s.

Lussi-Modeste started his career as a film director in 2004 with the short film Kissing Tigers. In 2011, he released his feature directorial debut, the drama Jimmy Rivière. He later wrote and directed the drama films The Price of Success (2017), and The Good Teacher (2024). Lussi-Modeste also co-wrote the screenplay of Rebecca Zlotowski's 2019 comedy drama film An Easy Girl, and Maïwenn's 2023 historical drama film Jeanne du Barry.

In the 2020s, Lussi-Modeste kept working as a French teacher at a school in Aubervilliers in the Seine-Saint-Denis department, the northeastern suburbs of Paris.

== Filmography ==
=== As director ===
Year	Title	Notes	Ref(s)
2004	Kissing Tigers	Short film	
2005	Courts mais GAY: Tome 10	Short film, segment Embrasser les tigres	
2007	Dans l'oeil	Short film	
2009	I'm Coming	Short film	
2011	Jimmy Rivière	Also screenwriter	
2017	The Price of Success	Also screenwriter	
2024	The Good Teacher	Also screenwriter	

=== As screenwriter ===
Year	Title	Notes	Ref(s)
2004	Pilou	Short film; directed by Claudine Natkin	
2019	An Easy Girl	Directed by Rebecca Zlotowski	
2023	Jeanne du Barry	Directed by Maïwenn	

=== As actor ===
Year	Title	Role	Notes
2023	Jeanne du Barry	Doctor La Martinière	Directed by Maïwenn

== Awards and nominations ==
Year	Award / Festival	Category	Work	Result	Ref(s)
2011	Angers Premiers Plans Film Festival	Audience Award - Best French Feature Film	Jimmy Rivière	Won	
2011	Louis Delluc Prize	Best Debut Film	Jimmy Rivière	Nominated	
2017	San Sebastián International Film Festival	New Directors Award	The Price of Success	Nominated	
