= Rebecca Zlotowski =

French film director and screenwriter (born 1980

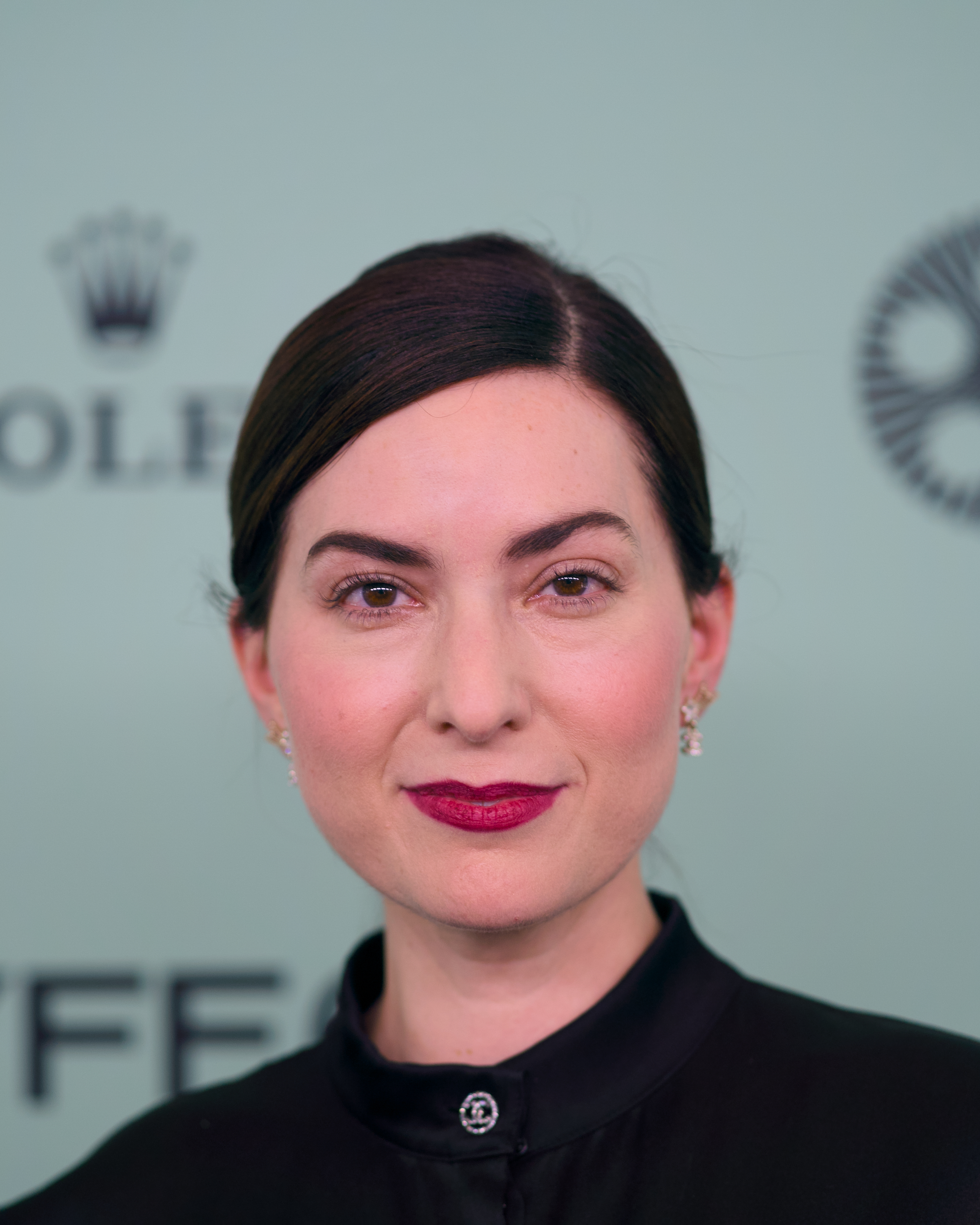
- Zlotowski at the 2025 New York Film Festival
- Born: Rebecca Myriam Clara Zlotowski; 21 April 1980 (age 46); Paris, France
- Education: La Fémis
- Occupations: Film director, screenwriter
- Years active: 2006–present

Rebecca Zlotowski (French: [zlɔtɔfski]; born 21 April 1980) is a French film director and screenwriter.

== Early life ==
Zlotowski is of Jewish descent. Her father, Michel Zlotowski, who was born in Poland, is an English-French interpreter, while her Moroccan (born in Oujda) mother teaches Spanish. A former student at the École Normale Supérieure, Zlotowski received her teaching qualification in French modern literature in 2003. She graduated in 2007 at La Fémis in the scriptwriting section.

== Career ==
Her first feature film, Belle Épine, was her graduation project at La Fémis, written under the guidance of her mentor Lodge Kerrigan. It was presented in competition at the 49th Critics' Week and won the Louis Delluc Prize for Best First Film in January 2011, as well as the French critics' union prize for Best First Film. Léa Seydoux was nominated for a César Award for Most Promising Actress.

In 2013, Zlotowski directed Grand Central, starring Seydoux and Tahar Rahim which premiered at the 2013 Cannes Film Festival in the Un Certain Regard section.

In 2016, Planetarium, starring Natalie Portman and Lily-Rose Depp as sisters, was released. The film screened Out of Competition at the 73rd Venice International Film Festival.

In June 2018, Zlotowski was invited to become a member of the Academy of Motion Picture Arts and Sciences.

Zlotowski's fourth film An Easy Girl premiered at the 2019 Cannes Film Festival in the Directors' Fortnight section where it won the SACD Award for Best French-language Film.

That same year, Canal+ premiered the series Les Sauvages, which she co-created with Sabri Louatah, the author of the novel from which the series is adapted. Zlotowski directed all the episodes of the series. The series won the best prize from the French critics union.

In 2022, her fifth film, Other People's Children, starring Virginie Efira, Roschdy Zem and Chiara Mastroianni is presented in competition at the 79th Venice International Film Festival.

In 2025, her film A Private Life, with a cast led by Jodie Foster, Daniel Auteuil and Virginie Efira, was presented at the 2025 Cannes Film Festival and the 52nd Telluride Film Festival.

== Filmography ==
=== As Filmmaker ===
Year	English title	Original title	Notes
2010	Dear Prudence	Belle Épine	Louis Delluc Prize for Best First Film
2013	Grand Central		Cabourg Film Festival-Grand Prix; François Chalais Prize; Lumière Awards-Special Jury Prize
2016	Planetarium		
2019	An Easy Girl	Une fille facile	
2022	Other People's Children	Les enfants des autres	Nominated—Golden Lion
2025	A Private Life	Vie privée	

=== Only screenwriter ===
Year	Title	Notes
2006	Dans le rang	Short film
2006	Les Garçons	Short film
2007	Dans l'œil	Short film
2007	Parcours d'obstacles	Short film
2009	Just for Sex	Short film
2011	Jimmy Rivière	Co-writer
2013	You and the Night	Scenario consultant
2015	Despite the Night	Co-writer
2024	Emmanuelle	Co-writer

=== Television ===
- Savages (2019)
