= Lilburn, Georgia =

City in Georgia, United States

- City
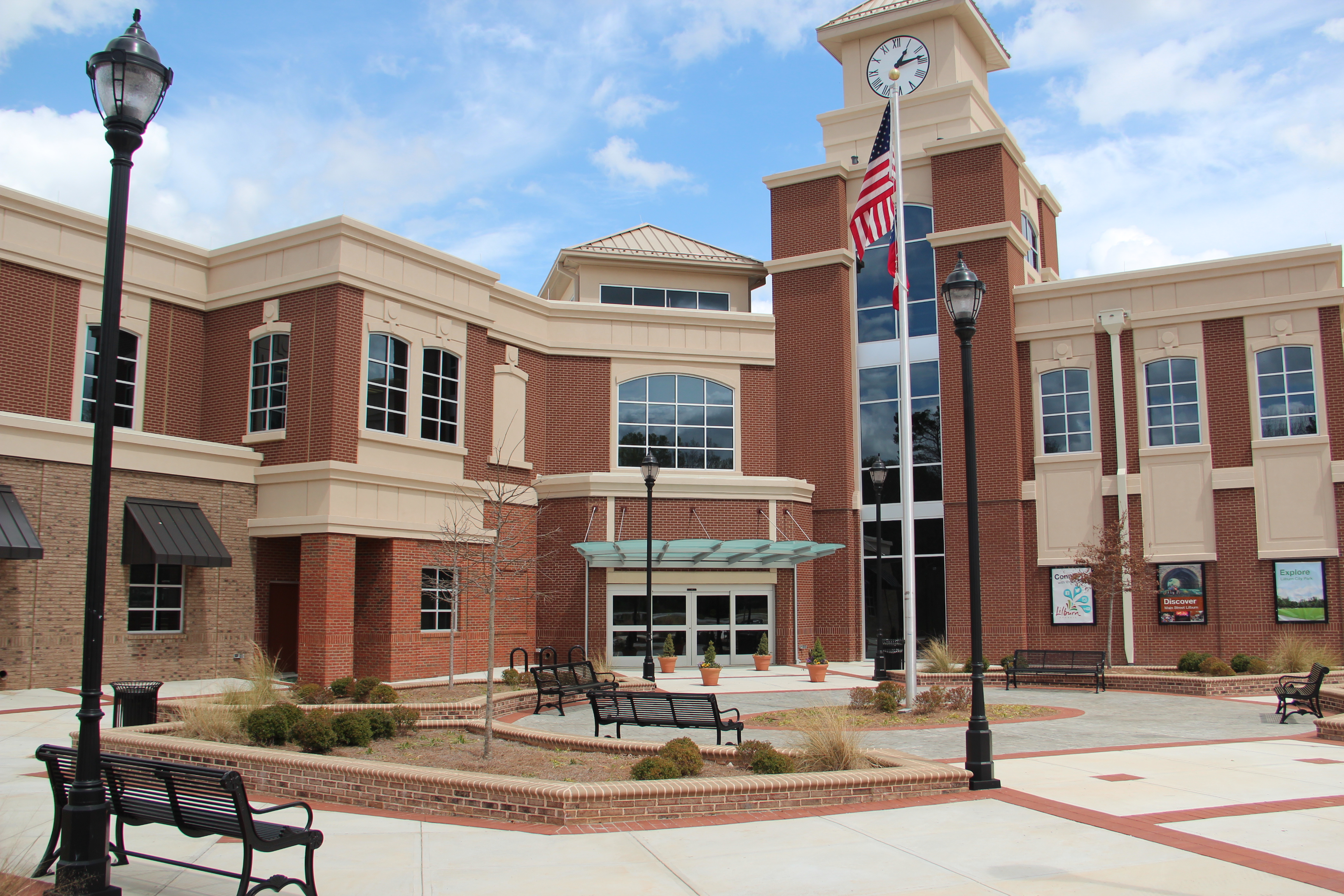
- Lilburn City Hall
- Motto(s): "Small town, Big difference"
- Location in Gwinnett County and the state of Georgia
- Coordinates: 33°53′20″N 84°8′27″W
- Country: United States
- State: Georgia
- County: Gwinnett

Government
  - Mayor: Johnny Crist

Area
  - Total: 6.85 sq mi (17.74 km^{2})
  - Land: 6.80 sq mi (17.61 km^{2})
  - Water: 0.050 sq mi (0.13 km^{2})
- Elevation: 950 ft (290 m)

Population (2020)
  - Total: 14,502
  - Density: 2,133.3/sq mi (823.66/km^{2})
- Time zone: UTC-5 (Eastern (EST))
  - Summer (DST): UTC-4 (EDT)
- ZIP codes: 30047-30048
- Area code: 470/678/770
- FIPS code: 13-46356
- GNIS feature ID: 0332213
- Website: www.cityoflilburn.com

Lilburn is a city in Gwinnett County, Georgia, United States. The population was 14,502 at the 2020 census. The estimated population was 12,810 in 2019. It is a part of the Atlanta metropolitan area.

== History ==
The city of Lilburn was founded in 1890 by the Seaboard Air Line Railway. The area previously known as "McDaniel" was renamed "Lilburn" after the general superintendent of the railroad, Lilburn Trigg Myers of Virginia. The town was incorporated as Lilburn on July 27, 1910.

A devastating fire and hard economic times in the 1920s ended the prosperity. A revitalization of the original historic area has emerged with shopping and restaurants in the Old Town district which has been described as a "slice of history."

== Geography ==
Lilburn is located in western Gwinnett County at 33°53′20″N 84°8′27″W (33.888853, -84.140897). U.S. Route 29 (Lawrenceville Highway) passes through the center of town, leading southwest 19 miles (31 km) to downtown Atlanta and northeast 11 miles (18 km) to Lawrenceville, the Gwinnett County seat.

According to the United States Census Bureau, Lilburn has a total area of 6.4 square miles (16.5 km^{2}), of which 6.3 square miles (16.4 km^{2}) is land and 0.04 square miles (0.1 km^{2}), or 0.82%, is water.

=== Cityscape and landmarks ===
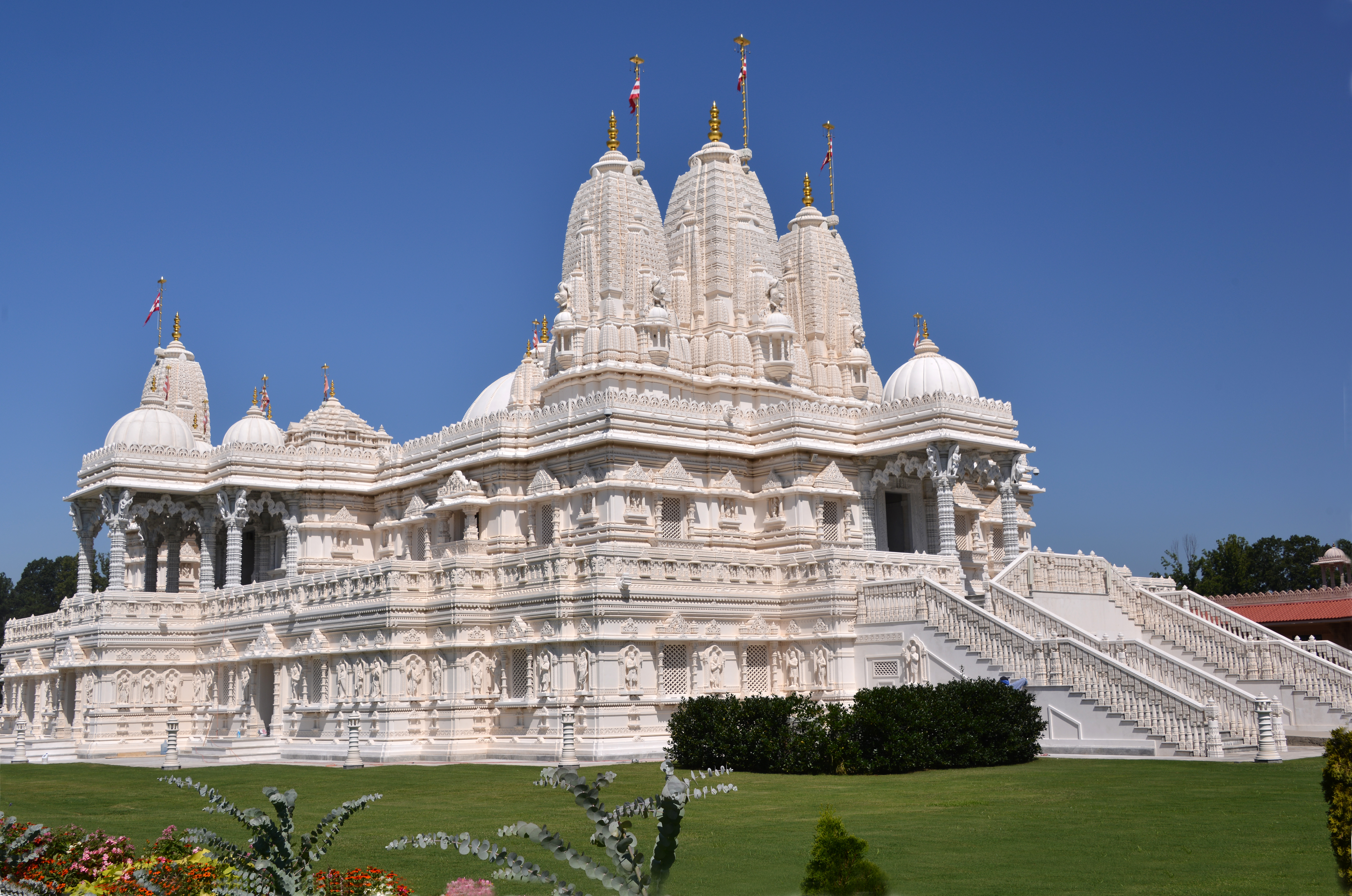
BAPS Hindu temple

Lilburn's downtown is currently undergoing a revitalization project. The city has already constructed a new city hall/library, having already rerouted Main Street's intersection with US 29. This revitalization includes miles of walking/biking paths referred to as the Greenway Trail and the reconstruction of the historic Prohibition Trail Bridges from the early 1900s.

The BAPS Shri Swaminarayan Mandir Atlanta is located in Lilburn, approximately two miles southwest of the city center. It is the tallest building in the city and was the largest Swaminarayan temple outside of India until the Robbinsville, NJ temple opened in 2014.

== Demographics ==
Historical population
Census	Pop.	Note	%±
1930	179		—
1960	753		—
1970	1,668		121.5%
1980	3,765		125.7%
1990	9,301		147.0%
2000	11,307		21.6%
2010	11,596		2.6%
2020	14,502		25.1%
2025 (est.)	16,369	▲	12.9%
U.S. Decennial Census; 2025

=== 2020 census ===
As of the 2020 census, Lilburn had a population of 14,502. The median age was 36.4 years. 26.4% of residents were under the age of 18 and 13.5% of residents were 65 years of age or older. For every 100 females there were 98.3 males, and for every 100 females age 18 and over there were 96.6 males age 18 and over.

100.0% of residents lived in urban areas, while 0.0% lived in rural areas.

There were 4,661 households in Lilburn, of which 40.8% had children under the age of 18 living in them. Of all households, 51.2% were married-couple households, 18.2% were households with a male householder and no spouse or partner present, and 25.4% were households with a female householder and no spouse or partner present. About 20.9% of all households were made up of individuals and 8.6% had someone living alone who was 65 years of age or older.

There were 4,841 housing units, of which 3.7% were vacant. The homeowner vacancy rate was 0.8% and the rental vacancy rate was 4.5%.

Lilburn racial composition as of 2020
Race	Num.	Perc.
White (non-Hispanic)	3,613	24.91%
Black or African American (non-Hispanic)	2,413	16.64%
Native American	25	0.17%
Asian	2,882	19.87%
Pacific Islander	6	0.04%
Other/Mixed	541	3.73%
Hispanic or Latino	5,022	34.63%

== Education ==
=== Primary and secondary schools ===
==== Public schools ====
Gwinnett County Public Schools operates public schools.

The following have Lilburn addresses:

Elementary schools

- Arcado Elementary (Parkview)
- Camp Creek Elementary (Parkview)
- G.H. Hopkins Elementary (Meadowcreek)
- Knight Elementary (Parkview)
- Lilburn Elementary (Meadowcreek)
- Mountain Park Elementary (Parkview)
- R.D. Head Elementary (Brookwood)
- Rebecca Minor Elementary (Berkmar)

Middle schools

- Berkmar Middle School (Berkmar)
- Five Forks Middle School (Brookwood)
- Lilburn Middle School (Meadowcreek)
- Trickum Middle School (Parkview)

High schools

- Berkmar High School (Berkmar) – Lilburn
- Brookwood High School (Brookwood) – Snellville
- McClure Health Science High School (Meadowcreek) – Duluth
- Meadowcreek High School (Meadowcreek) – Norcross
- Parkview High School (Parkview) – Lilburn

==== Private schools ====
- Gwinnett College
- Killian Hill Christian School
- Parkview Christian School
- Providence Christian Academy
- Regina Caeli Academy
- St. John Neumann Regional Catholic School

=== Public libraries ===
Gwinnett County Public Library operates the Mountain Park Branch and the Lilburn Branch.

== Events ==
Lilburn Daze Arts and Crafts Festival, hosted and organized by the Lilburn Woman's Club, an affiliate of the GFWC, is celebrated on the second Saturday in October and features over 200 vendors. This one-day event features local artisans, children's activities, live entertainment, food, hayrides, a health screening tent and a petting zoo.

The annual "Spark in the Park" is a 4 July parade, which features local vendors, live performances, and fireworks

The annual Christmas Parade, held on the first Saturday in December, usually features about 100 entrants marching down Main Street on a route ending at Lilburn City Park. Proceeds from this event fund local scholarships and many other community improvement projects in the greater Lilburn area.

== Transportation ==
=== Major roads ===
- State Route 8
- U.S. Route 29
- State Route 378

=== Pedestrians and cycling ===
- Camp Creek Greenway
- Norcross-Lilburn Trail (Proposed)

== Notable people ==
- Blake Brettschneider, soccer player who represented the United States at a youth level
- Brett Butler, racing driver
- Everton Blair, politician
- Ken Butler III, racing driver
- Alessandro Castro, soccer player who represented Honduras at a youth level
- John Crist, comedian
- Violet Chachki, drag queen
- Kevin Cone, NFL player, Atlanta Falcons
- Andrew Davis, racing driver
- Jeff Francoeur, Major League Baseball player
- Sean Johnson, soccer player
- Kate Michael, Miss District of Columbia, 2006
- Matt Olson, Major League Baseball player
- Michael Palmer, NFL player Atlanta Falcons
- Lennon Parham, actor, writer, and comedian
- Eric Shanteau, Olympic swimmer
- Jon Stinchcomb, football player, All American University of Georgia, NFL New Orleans Saints, Pro Bowler and Super Bowl Champion 2010
- Jack O'Keefe, Youth Musician & Marcher
- Matt Stinchcomb, football player, All American University of Georgia, NFL Oakland Raiders and Tampa Bay Buccaneers
- Don Stone, radio GM, publisher, TV weatherman
- Matt Watkins, NHL player Phoenix Coyotes
- Quavo from the group Migos, Rapper, Actor
- Offset from the group Migos, Rapper, Fashion Designer
- Takeoff from the group Migos, Rapper

== Twin towns and sister cities ==
Lilburn is twinned with:

- Suva Reka, Kosovo
