= List of accolades received by Blue Is the Warmest Colour =

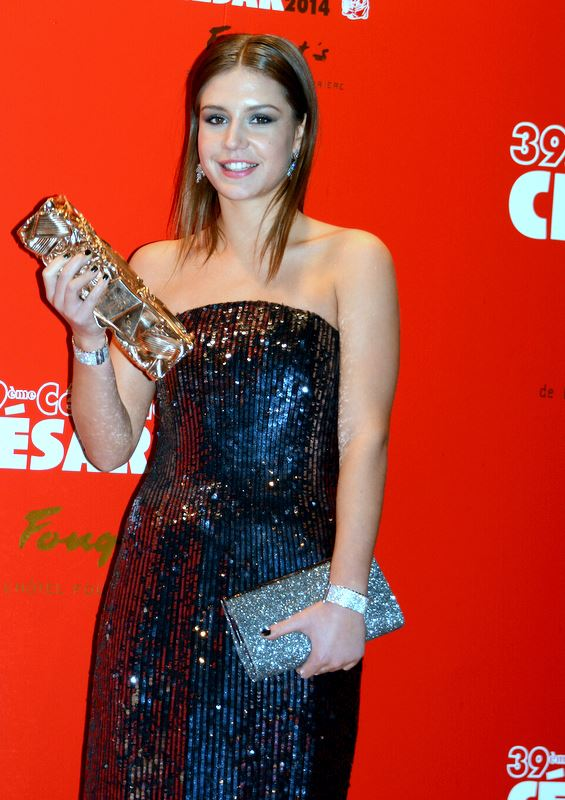
- Adèle Exarchopoulos received several awards and nominations for her performance in the film.
Accolades
Award	Won	Nominated
Austin Film Critics Association	1	1
Belgian Film Critics Association	0	1
Bodil Awards	1	1
Boston Society of Film Critics	0	1
British Academy Film Awards	0	2
British Independent Film Awards	1	1
Cannes Film Festival	2	2
César Awards	1	8
Chicago Film Critics Association	1	4
Critics' Choice Movie Awards	2	2
Dallas–Fort Worth Film Critics Association	1	1
Detroit Film Critics Society	0	1
Dorian Awards	2	5
Dublin Film Critics Circle	1	5
Empire Awards	0	1
European Film Awards	0	2
Florida Film Critics Circle	1	1
French Syndicate of Cinema Critics	1	1
Gaudí Awards	0	1
GLAAD Media Awards	0	1
Globes de Cristal Awards	1	2
Golden Globe Awards	0	1
Gopo Awards	0	1
Goya Awards	0	1
Guldbagge Awards	1	1
Hamptons International Film Festival	1	1
Houston Film Critics Society	0	1
Independent Spirit Awards	1	1
London Film Critics' Circle	1	3
Los Angeles Film Critics Association	2	2
Louis Delluc Prize	1	1
Lumière Awards	4	4
Magritte Awards	2	3
Motion Picture Sound Editors	0	1
National Board of Review	1	1
National Society of Film Critics	1	3
New York Film Critics Circle	1	2
New York Film Critics Online	2	2
Online Film Critics Society	1	4
Polish Film Awards	0	1
Robert Awards	1	1
San Diego Film Critics Society	0	2
San Francisco Film Critics Circle	1	3
Santa Barbara International Film Festival	1	1
Satellite Awards	0	3
St. Louis Gateway Film Critics Association	1	3
Toronto Film Critics Association	0	1
Vancouver Film Critics Circle	0	1
Washington D.C. Area Film Critics Association	0	2
- Total number of awards and nominations
Totals	39	96
- References

Blue Is the Warmest Colour (French: La Vie d'Adèle – Chapitres 1 & 2; French pronunciation: [la vi dadɛl ʃapitʁ œ̃n‿e dø]) is a 2013 French romantic coming-of-age drama film directed by Abdellatif Kechiche, and produced by Kechiche, Brahim Chioua, and Vincent Maraval. The screenplay also co-written by Kechiche was based on Jul Maroh's 2010 graphic novel of the same name. Adèle Exarchopoulos stars as a teenager who falls in love with an older woman played by Léa Seydoux.

The film premiered at the 66th Cannes Film Festival on 23 May 2013 where it won the Palme d'Or. For the first time, the jury at Cannes presented the award to three recipients: Kechiche, Exarchopoulos, and Seydoux. At the age of 19, Exarchopoulos became the youngest recipient of the award. The film grossed over €14 million at the worldwide box office on a production budget of €4 million. (Note: Per average U. S. Dollar to Euro Exchange Rate for 2013 of 0.753045: $19,492,879 = €14,679,015.) Rotten Tomatoes, a review aggregator, surveyed 197 reviews and judged 89% to be positive.

Blue Is the Warmest Colour garnered awards and nominations in a variety of categories with particular praise for Kechiche's direction, and the performances of Exarchopoulos and Seydoux. At the 39th César Awards, the film received eight nominations including Best Film, Best Director for Kechiche, and Best Actress for Seydoux. Exarchopoulous was the sole winner for Most Promising Actress. She also won the Critics' Choice Movie Award for Best Young Performer, Lumière Award for Best Female Revelation, and Best Breakthrough Actress from the National Board of Review. Seydoux garnered the Lumière Award for Best Actress as well as a nomination for the BAFTA Rising Star Award. The film also received an Independent Spirit Award, Bodil Award, Robert Award, and Guldbagge Award.

== Accolades ==
Award	Date of ceremony	Category	Recipient(s)	Result	Ref(s)
Austin Film Critics Association	17 December 2013	Best Foreign Language Film	Blue Is the Warmest Colour	Won	
Belgian Film Critics Association	4 January 2014	Grand Prix	Blue Is the Warmest Colour	Nominated	
Bodil Awards	1 February 2014	Best Non-American Film	Blue Is the Warmest Colour	Won	
Boston Society of Film Critics	8 December 2013	Best Foreign Language Film	Blue Is the Warmest Colour	Runner-up	
British Academy Film Awards	16 February 2014	Rising Star	Léa Seydoux	Nominated	
British Academy Film Awards	16 February 2014	Best Film Not in the English Language	Blue Is the Warmest Colour	Nominated	
British Independent Film Awards	8 December 2013	Best International Independent Film	Blue Is the Warmest Colour	Won	
Cannes Film Festival	26 May 2013	Palme d'Or	Abdellatif Kechiche, Adèle Exarchopoulos, and Léa Seydoux	Won	
Cannes Film Festival	26 May 2013	FIPRESCI Prize	Blue Is the Warmest Colour	Won	
César Awards	28 February 2014	Best Film	Blue Is the Warmest Colour	Nominated	
César Awards	28 February 2014	Best Director	Abdellatif Kechiche	Nominated	
César Awards	28 February 2014	Best Actress	Léa Seydoux	Nominated	
César Awards	28 February 2014	Most Promising Actress	Adèle Exarchopoulos	Won	
César Awards	28 February 2014	Best Adaptation	Abdellatif Kechiche, and Ghalia Lacroix	Nominated	
César Awards	28 February 2014	Best Cinematography	Sofian El Fani	Nominated	
César Awards	28 February 2014	Best Editing	Camille Toubkis, Albertine Lastera, and Jean-Marie Lengellé	Nominated	
César Awards	28 February 2014	Best Sound	Jerome Chenevoy, Fabien Pochet, and Jean-Paul Hurier	Nominated	
Chicago Film Critics Association	16 December 2013	Best Actress	Adèle Exarchopoulos	Nominated	
Chicago Film Critics Association	16 December 2013	Best Supporting Actress	Léa Seydoux	Nominated	
Chicago Film Critics Association	16 December 2013	Best Foreign Language Film	Blue Is the Warmest Colour	Nominated	
Chicago Film Critics Association	16 December 2013	Breakthrough Performance	Adèle Exarchopoulos	Won	
Critics' Choice Movie Awards	16 January 2014	Best Young Performer	Adèle Exarchopoulos	Won	
Critics' Choice Movie Awards	16 January 2014	Best Foreign Language Film	Blue Is the Warmest Colour	Won	
Dallas–Fort Worth Film Critics Association	16 December 2013	Best Foreign Language Film	Blue Is the Warmest Colour	Won	
Detroit Film Critics Society	13 December 2013	Best Actress	Adèle Exarchopoulos	Nominated	
Dorian Awards	21 January 2014	Film of the Year	Blue Is the Warmest Colour	Nominated	
Dorian Awards	21 January 2014	Film Performance of the Year – Actress	Adèle Exarchopoulos	Nominated	
Dorian Awards	21 January 2014	LGBT Film of the Year	Blue Is the Warmest Colour	Won	
Dorian Awards	21 January 2014	Foreign Language Film of the Year	Blue Is the Warmest Colour	Won	
Dorian Awards	21 January 2014	Rising Star Award	Adèle Exarchopoulos	Nominated	
Dublin Film Critics Circle	20 December 2013	Best Film	Blue Is the Warmest Colour	4th place	
Dublin Film Critics Circle	20 December 2013	Best Director	Abdellatif Kechiche	4th place	
Dublin Film Critics Circle	20 December 2013	Best Screenplay	Abdellatif Kechiche, and Ghalia Lacroix	5th place	
Dublin Film Critics Circle	20 December 2013	Best Actress	Adèle Exarchopoulos	Runner-up	
Dublin Film Critics Circle	20 December 2013	Best Newcomer	Adèle Exarchopoulos	Won	
Empire Awards	30 March 2014	Best Female Newcomer	Adèle Exarchopoulos	Nominated	
European Film Awards	7 December 2013	Best Film	Blue Is the Warmest Colour	Nominated	
European Film Awards	7 December 2013	Best Director	Abdellatif Kechiche	Nominated	
Florida Film Critics Circle	18 December 2013	Best Foreign Language Film	Blue Is the Warmest Colour	Won	
French Syndicate of Cinema Critics	23 May 2013	Best French Film	Blue Is the Warmest Colour	Won	
Gaudí Awards	2 February 2014	Best European Film	Blue Is the Warmest Colour	Nominated	
GLAAD Media Awards	3 May 2014	Outstanding Film – Wide Release	Blue Is the Warmest Colour	Nominated	
Globes de Cristal Awards	10 March 2014	Best Film	Blue Is the Warmest Colour	Nominated	
Globes de Cristal Awards	10 March 2014	Best Actress	Adèle Exarchopoulos	Won	
Golden Eagle Award	January 23, 2015	Best Foreign Language Film	Blue Is the Warmest Colour	Nominated	
Golden Globe Awards	12 January 2014	Best Foreign Language Film	Blue Is the Warmest Colour	Nominated	
Gopo Awards	24 March 2014	Best European Film	Blue Is the Warmest Colour	Nominated	
Goya Awards	9 February 2014	Best European Film	Blue Is the Warmest Colour	Nominated	
Guldbagge Awards	20 January 2014	Best Foreign Language Film	Blue Is the Warmest Colour	Won	
Hamptons International Film Festival	12 October 2013	Variety's 10 Actors to Watch	Léa Seydoux (Note: Shared with Michael B. Jordan, Oscar Isaac, Scott Haze, Dane DeHaan, Jack Huston, Tatiana Maslany, Lupita Nyong'o, David Oyelowo, and Brie Larson)	Won	
Houston Film Critics Society	15 December 2013	Best Foreign Language Film	Blue Is the Warmest Colour	Nominated	
Independent Spirit Awards	1 March 2014	Best International Film	Blue Is the Warmest Colour	Won	
London Film Critics' Circle	2 February 2014	Film of the Year	Blue Is the Warmest Colour	Nominated	
London Film Critics' Circle	2 February 2014	Actress of the Year	Adèle Exarchopoulos	Nominated	
London Film Critics' Circle	2 February 2014	Foreign Language Film of the Year	Blue Is the Warmest Colour	Won	
Los Angeles Film Critics Association	8 December 2013	Best Foreign Language Film	Blue Is the Warmest Colour	Won	
Los Angeles Film Critics Association	8 December 2013	Best Actress	Adèle Exarchopoulos (Note: Tied with Cate Blanchett for Blue Jasmine)	Won	
Louis Delluc Prize	17 December 2013	Best Film	Blue Is the Warmest Colour	Won	
Lumière Awards	20 January 2014	Best Film	Blue Is the Warmest Colour	Won	
Lumière Awards	20 January 2014	Best Director	Abdellatif Kechiche	Won	
Lumière Awards	20 January 2014	Best Actress	Léa Seydoux	Won	
Lumière Awards	20 January 2014	Best Female Revelation	Adèle Exarchopoulos	Won	
Magritte Awards	1 February 2014	Best Foreign Film in Coproduction	Blue Is the Warmest Colour	Won	
Magritte Awards	1 February 2014	Best Supporting Actress	Catherine Salée	Won	
Magritte Awards	1 February 2014	Most Promising Actress	Mona Walravens	Nominated	
Motion Picture Sound Editors	17 February 2014	Best Sound Editing: Sound Effects, Foley, Dialogue & ADR in a Foreign Feature Film	Fabien Pochet	Nominated	
National Board of Review	4 December 2013	Best Breakthrough Actress	Adèle Exarchopoulos	Won	
National Society of Film Critics	4 January 2014	Best Actress	Adèle Exarchopoulos	Runner-up	
National Society of Film Critics	4 January 2014	Best Supporting Actress	Léa Seydoux	Runner-up	
National Society of Film Critics	4 January 2014	Best Foreign Language Film	Blue Is the Warmest Colour	Won	
New York Film Critics Circle	3 December 2013	Best Foreign Language Film	Blue Is the Warmest Colour	Won	
New York Film Critics Circle	3 December 2013	Best Actress	Adèle Exarchopoulos	3rd place	
New York Film Critics Online	8 December 2013	Best Foreign Language Film	Blue Is the Warmest Colour	Won	
New York Film Critics Online	8 December 2013	Breakthrough Performance	Adèle Exarchopoulos	Won	
Online Film Critics Society	16 December 2013	Best Picture	Blue Is the Warmest Colour	Nominated	
Online Film Critics Society	16 December 2013	Best Foreign Language Film	Blue Is the Warmest Colour	Won	
Online Film Critics Society	16 December 2013	Best Actress	Adèle Exarchopoulos	Nominated	
Online Film Critics Society	16 December 2013	Best Supporting Actress	Léa Seydoux	Nominated	
Polish Film Awards	10 March 2014	Best European Film	Blue Is the Warmest Colour	Nominated	
Prix Jacques Prévert du Scénario	4 February 2014	Best Adaptation	Abdellatif Kechiche and Ghalia Lacroix	Nominated	
Robert Awards	26 February 2014	Best Non-American Film	Blue Is the Warmest Colour	Won	
San Diego Film Critics Society	11 December 2013	Best Actress	Adèle Exarchopoulos	Nominated	
San Diego Film Critics Society	11 December 2013	Best Foreign Language Film	Blue Is the Warmest Colour	Nominated	
San Francisco Film Critics Circle	15 December 2013	Best Actress	Adèle Exarchopoulos	Nominated	
San Francisco Film Critics Circle	15 December 2013	Best Supporting Actress	Léa Seydoux	Nominated	
San Francisco Film Critics Circle	15 December 2013	Best Foreign Language Film	Blue Is the Warmest Colour	Won	
Santa Barbara International Film Festival	4 February 2014	Virtuosos Award	Adèle Exarchopoulos (Note: Shared with Michael B. Jordan, Brie Larson, June Squibb, Oscar Isaac, Jared Leto, and Daniel Brühl)	Won	
Satellite Awards	23 February 2014	Best Foreign Language Film	Blue Is the Warmest Colour	Nominated	
Satellite Awards	23 February 2014	Best Actress – Motion Picture	Adèle Exarchopoulos	Nominated	
Satellite Awards	23 February 2014	Best Supporting Actress – Motion Picture	Léa Seydoux	Nominated	
St. Louis Gateway Film Critics Association	16 December 2013	Best Supporting Actress	Léa Seydoux	Nominated	
St. Louis Gateway Film Critics Association	16 December 2013	Best Foreign Language Film	Blue Is the Warmest Colour	Won	
St. Louis Gateway Film Critics Association	16 December 2013	Best Art-House or Festival Film	Blue Is the Warmest Colour	Runner-up	
Toronto Film Critics Association	7 January 2014	Best Foreign Language Film	Blue Is the Warmest Colour	Runner-up	
Vancouver Film Critics Circle	7 January 2014	Best Foreign Language Film	Blue Is the Warmest Colour	Nominated	
Washington D.C. Area Film Critics Association	9 December 2013	Best Youth Performance	Adèle Exarchopoulos	Nominated	
Washington D.C. Area Film Critics Association	9 December 2013	Best Foreign Language Film	Blue Is the Warmest Colour	Nominated	

== See also ==
- 2013 in film
