= Sepideh Jodeyri =

Iranian poet

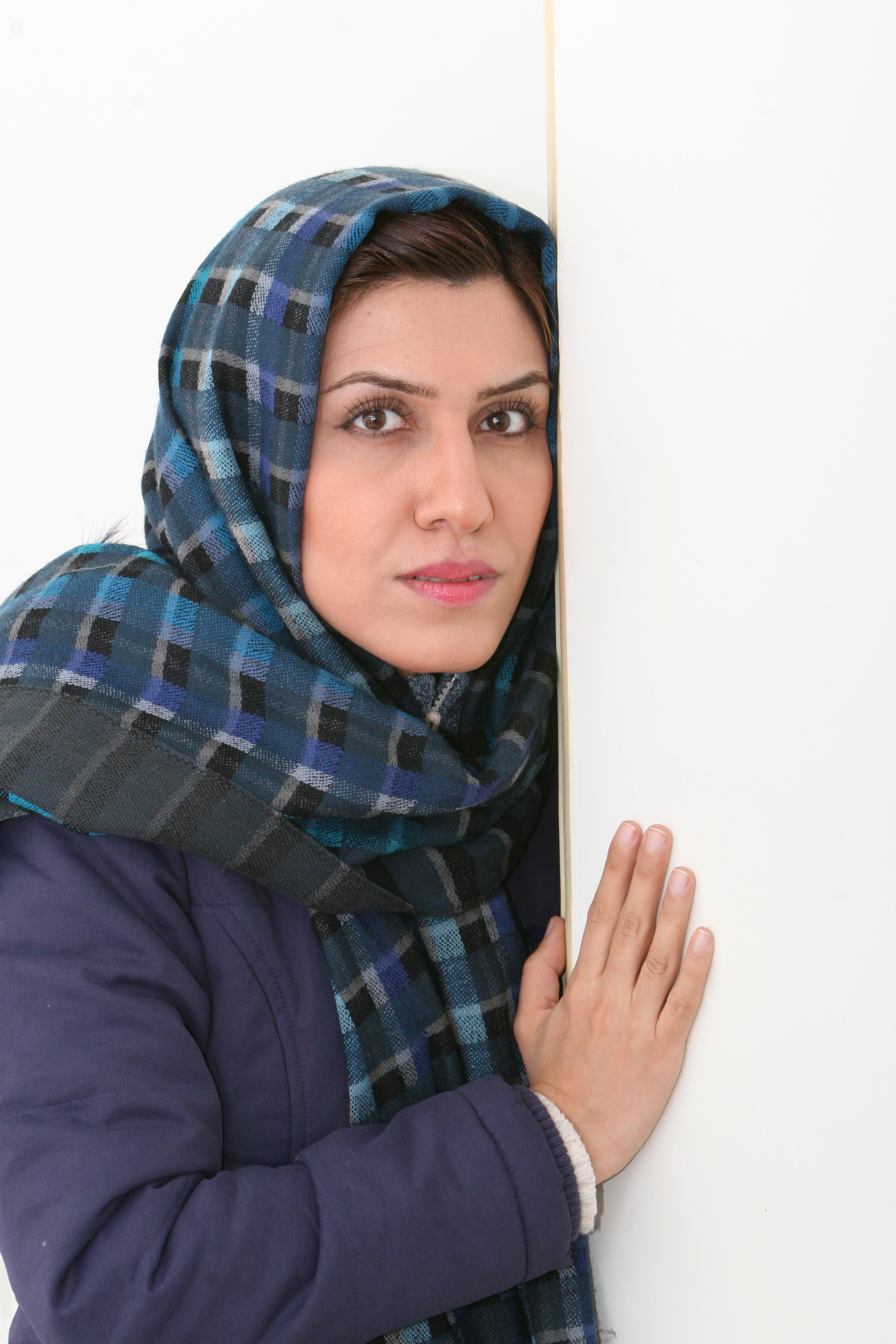

Sepideh Jodeyri (Persian: سپیده جدیری born 23 May 1976, corresponding to 2 Khordâd 1355 by the Iranian calendar, in Ahvaz, Iran) is an Iranian poet, literary critic, translator and journalist living in Washington DC, United States.

A winner of the Jovellanos International Poetry Prize in 2015 for one of her poems, Chãk, and a graduate in chemical engineering from Iran University of Science and Technology, Jodeyri has published several works, including six poetry collections, a collection of short stories and an anthology of her poems. Her articles and interviews have been published in Iranian newspapers and magazines as well as European ones. She has also translated poetry books by Edgar Allan Poe and Jorge Luis Borges as well as the graphic novel, Blue Is the Warmest Color by Jul Maroh into Persian.

In the aftermath of the highly contested 2009 presidential election in Iran, which resulted in the re-election of President Mahmoud Ahmadinejad (2009-2013), Jodeyri spoke publicly in support of the pro-democracy movement (known as Iranian Green Movement). Shortly after, Jodeyri's works were banned inside Iran, her close friends were put in prison, forcing her to leave the country and move to Italy in February 2011. She stayed two years in Italy as the guest writer of ICORN. Jodeyri now lives in Washington DC, the United States.

== Works ==
She translated Blue is the Warmest Color, as Abi Garmtarin Rang Ast. Conservative groups in Iran criticised her. There was a plan for a debut of this translation in Tehran, but it was later canceled.

== Khorshid Prize ==
Because of her belief in Feminism, she founded a feminist prize, the Khorshid Prize in 2008 with the stated aim of recognizing "the best poetry book of the year written by an Iranian woman." The prize included 5 Bahar-e Azadi gold coins (total value at the time about 14.5 million rials, equivalent to $1,400 USD or about 1,050 euros). Sponsored by Alghadir hospital chair Farideh Farhadi, ophthalmologist Fatemeh Haghbin, biologist Azam Paki and poet-critic Fatemeh Salarvand, the judging committee included Jodeyri herself (as the chair), poet-translators Azita Ghahreman and Pegah Ahmadi, poet-critics Roya Tafti, Bahareh Rezaei and Mehri Jafari. The prize was being held for four years inside Iran though it was declared banned after Jodeyri left the country in 2011. The chairwoman she had assigned on behalf of herself and one of their sponsors were being interrogated by Iran's intelligence service agents several times at the time.

== Bibliography ==
- Dreams of an Amphibious Girl. A collection of poems, Meyar Publications, 2000, Tehran, Iran.
- Logical. A collection of short stories, Khorshidsavaran Publications, 2001, Tehran, Iran.
- The Raven. A translation of Edgar Allan Poe's selected poems from English into Persian, Mahriz Publications, 2006, Tehran, Iran.
- Pink Inclined to My Blood. A collection of poems, Saless Publications, 2007, Tehran, Iran.
- An anthology of poems and short stories, Naakojaa Publishing house, 2011, Paris, France.
- A Good Girl Poet. A collection of poems, Negah Publications, 2012, Tehran, Iran.
- And Others. A collection of poems, Butimar Publications, 2014, Mashhad, Iran.
- Abi Garmtarin Rang Ast. Persian translation of Blue is the Warmest Color by Jul Maroh, Naakojaa Publishing house, 2014, Paris, France.
- And Emptiness Is Flowing Under My Skin. A collection of poems, H&S Media Publications, 2015, London, UK.
- The Complete Rooting Up. A collection of poems, Underground publications, 2017, Tehran, Iran.

== Awards ==
- Winner of the Jovellanos International Poetry Prize, ‘The Best Poem in the World’ in 2015 for one of her poems, Chãk. The prize is based in Spain and includes 2000 Euros.
- Nominated for Karnameh Poetry Prize in Iran in 2000, for her first poetry book, Dreams of an Amphibious Girl.

== Lectures and Workshops ==
- Guest poet at the Scottish Parliament on the international Day of the Imprisoned Writer, Edinburgh, Scotland, 15 November 2017.
- The international guest poet for International Women’s Group Glasgow North Many Voices writing group, Glasgow, Scotland, 16 November 2017.
- A lecture on Iranian Resistance Poetry since 2009. SOAS, University of London, 2014.
- An anti-workshop on Poetry, Coquitlam Public Library, British Columibia, Canada, 2014.
- Blue is the Warmest Colour: Sepideh Jodeyri Talk & Screening, International Literature Festival Dublin, 2015.
- Forum 2000 Conference 2015, two panels: "Education as a Tool for Political Manipulation" and "Iran, Today and Tomorrow".
- Guest poet at COSMOPOÉTICA festival 2015, Córdoba (Spain), 9 October 2015.
- COMICS VS FREEDOM, WITH SEPIDEH JODEYRI & KARRIE FRANSMAN, Dundee Literary Festival, Dundee, Scotland, 24 October 2015.
- Guest poet at Rally & Broad, Glasgow, Scotland, 25 October 2015.
- Guest poet at Shore Poets, Edinburgh, Scotland, 25 October 2015.

== Articles and Interviews ==
- Arya – the Victor Jara of my Homeland, Freemuse Website, 2012.
- Iranian translator of Blue Is the Warmest Colour 'declared persona non grata', The Guardian, 2015.
- Poetic Struggles: On Writing and Censorship in Iran (Part 1/2), Fair Observer, 2014.
- Poetic Struggles: On Writing and Censorship in Iran (Part 2/2), Fair Observer, 2014.
- Sepideh Jodeyri: "No soy víctima del gobierno iraní, soy una luchadora", PlayGroundMagazine, Spain, 2015.
- Writer's Block: The Story of Censorship in Iran, Small Media, 2015.
- Iranians Cheated by Rouhani's Failed Promises, Fair Observer, 2015.
- Sepideh Jodeyri and Claire Askew in conversation with Sasha de Buyl, Scottish PEN, SoundCloud, October 2015.
- Poetry, art and 'to dare to talk about my body', Dangerous Women Project, Institute for Advanced Studies in the Humanities, the University of Edinburgh, April 2016.
- Nikdy jsem nedovolila, aby mi cenzura mrzačila básně, Literary magazine, PLAV, Prague, Czech Republic, 2016.
- Iran’s Radical Poetry in the Making, Fair Observer, 2017.

== Samples of Work ==
- A piece of flesh, translated by Dr. Fereshteh Vaziri Nasab, Dangerous Women Project, Institute for Advanced Studies in the Humanities, the University of Edinburgh, April 2016.
- It’s only the heart of Tehran, translated by Dr. Fereshteh Vaziri Nasab, video of the poetry recitation, the International Day of the Imprisoned Writer, the Scottish Parliament, 15 November 2017.
- The corner, translated by Dr. Fereshteh Vaziri Nasab, video of the poetry recitation, the Scottish PEN's Many Voices Project, University of Glasgow, 16 November 2017.
- Fire, take a step..., translated by Sholeh Wolpe, One Night Stanzas. [This translation was originally published in the anthology, "The Forbidden", by Michigan State University Press, February 1, 2012].
- With no pants, published in the anthology, "The Poetry of Iranian Women", CreateSpace Independent Publishing Platform, March 19, 2009.
- A poem that is a cat, translated by Dr. Fereshteh Vaziri Nasab, Fair Observer, 2017.

== Literary criticism ==
- Mohammad Motlagh
- Pegah Ahmadi
- Alireza Behnam
- Mehri Jafari
