= Blue Is the Warmest Color (comics) =

2010 graphic novel by Jul Maroh

Blue Is the Warmest Color (Le bleu est une couleur chaude)
- Original cover of the English-language edition
- Date: March 2010
- Page count: 160 pages
- Publisher: Glénat

Creative team
- Creator: Jul Maroh (credited in earlier printings under their deadname)

Original publication
- Date of publication: March 2010
- Language: French
- ISBN: 978-2723467834

Translation
- Publisher: Arsenal Pulp Press
- Date: 2013
- ISBN: 978-1551525143

Blue Is the Warmest Color (French: Le bleu est une couleur chaude, originally released as Blue Angel) is a French graphic novel by Jul Maroh, (Note: Initially credited as Julie Maroh; Blue Is the Warmest Color was released before Maroh came out as non-binary. Newer printings refer to the author as Jul Maroh.) published by Glénat in March 2010. The English-language edition was published by Arsenal Pulp Press in 2013. The novel tells a love story between two young women in France in the 1990s and 2000s.

Abdellatif Kechiche directed a film adaptation in 2013, titled Blue Is the Warmest Colour, which was awarded the Palme d'Or at the 2013 Cannes Film Festival.

== Summary ==
The story takes place in France between 1994 and 2008. After the death of her partner Clémentine, Emma goes to the home of Clémentine's parents, Daniel and Fabienne, in accordance with Clémentine's will, to request access to Clémentine's personal diary. Emma must face the hostility of Clémentine's father, somewhat offset by Clémentine's welcoming mother. The story then follows Emma as she reads Clémentine's diary, which tells the whole story of the relationship between the two young women from Clémentine's teenage years and her first meeting with Emma to her untimely death.

In the beginning, Clémentine meets a boy, Thomas, who is a student in Terminale (final year of lycée, the French equivalent of senior high school or sixth-form college); they like each other, but soon afterward, Clémentine becomes intrigued by a chance meeting with a blue-haired young woman on the arm of another woman, Sabine Decocq. For Clémentine, it is love at first sight. Unable to forget this encounter, she starts to have doubts about her sexuality, but decides to date Thomas because she wants to feel normal. Six months later, Clémentine is unable to have sex with Thomas and breaks up with him. Feeling depressed, she is helped by one of her male friends, Valentin, to whom she confesses everything; Valentin tells her that he has already dated a boy, which Clémentine finds quite comforting.

One evening shortly thereafter, Valentin takes Clémentine to some gay bars. Clémentine sees the blue-haired young woman again with Sabine at a lesbian bar. The blue-haired girl comes to talk to Clémentine and introduces herself as Emma. The two keep in touch and become friends, while Clémentine secretly falls in love with Emma. Clémentine then has to face the gossip and homophobic taunts from some of her schoolmates when they hear that she and Emma were at a gay bar together. Some time later, while the relationship between Emma and Sabine has somewhat stalled (mainly because Sabine often cheats on Emma), Clémentine eventually confides her feelings to Emma, who in turn says she is in love with her. They have sex and start an affair. Emma eventually finds the strength to break up with Sabine and starts living with Clémentine. One night, when the two spend the evening at Clémentine's place, Emma walks into the kitchen completely naked to get a glass of milk and Clémentine's mother catches her. Clémentine's parents then find both of them nude in the bedroom and their reaction is violently hostile: Clémentine is thrown out of her home, along with Emma.

Clémentine then starts living at Emma's parents' place; the two subsequently get a home of their own and live there happily for several years. Emma becomes an artist, while Clémentine becomes a high school teacher. Emma starts to become politically involved and takes part in LGBT activism, while Clémentine prefers to keep her sexuality private. One day, Emma discovers that Clémentine cheated on her with a male colleague; she angrily breaks up with her and kicks her out. Clémentine, who has taken refuge at Valentin's place, becomes depressed and addicted to pills. Valentin organises a meeting and leaves both women alone on a beach. Still in love with each other, they reconcile, but Clémentine is undone by her addiction, which results in a seizure that puts her in the hospital, where Emma discovers that she is not allowed access to her at first. Clémentine's parents and Emma eventually learn that it is too late to save her; the damage from the drugs is too great. Clémentine writes the final pages of her diary at the hospital, and then dies. As Emma reads the diary's conclusion, she remembers that Clémentine urged her to continue living her life as she knows it.

== History ==
Maroh started the comic at the age of 19 and took five years to complete it. It was supported by the French Community of Belgium.

From 27 to 30 January 2011, the novel was promoted during the 2011 Angoulême International Comics Festival, where it was part of the official selection. During this festival, Blue Is the Warmest Color was awarded the Fnac-SNCF Essential prize, an award selected by the public.

The deal for its English translation, to be released in September 2013, was made at the 2012 Frankfurt Book Fair.

== Editions and translations ==
- (in French) Julie Maroh, Le bleu est une couleur chaude, Glénat – Hors collection, 2010 ISBN 978-2-7234-6783-4
- Julie Maroh, Blue Is the Warmest Colour, Arsenal Pulp Press, 2013 ISBN 978-1-55152-514-3
- (in Spanish) Julie Maroh, El azul es un color cálido, Dibbuks, 2011 ISBN 978-84-92902-44-6
- (in Dutch) Julie Maroh, Blauw is een warme kleur, Glénat – Hors collection, 2011 ISBN 978-90-6969-933-2
- (in Portuguese) Julie Maroh, Azul é a cor mais quente, Editora Martins Fontes – Selo Martins, 2013 ISBN 978-85-8063-125-8
- (in Greek) Julie Maroh, Το Μπλε είναι το πιο Ζεστό Χρώμα, ΚΨΜ, 2013 ISBN 978-96-0675-084-7
- (in German) Julie Maroh, Blau ist eine warme Farbe, Splitter, 2013 ISBN 978-38-6869-695-0
- (in Swedish) Julie Maroh, Blå är den varmaste färgen, Nubeculis, 2015 ISBN 978-91-6378-736-2
- (in Serbian) Žil Maro, Plavo je najtoplija boja, Čarobna knjiga, 2026 ISBN 978-86-300-4154-9

== Awards ==
- Prix Jeune Auteur at the Salon de la BD et des Arts Graphiques of Roubaix 2010
- Prix Conseil Régional at the festival of Blois 2010
- Fnac-SNCF Essential at the 2011 Angoulême International Comics Festival
- Diplôme "Isidor" of the website altersexualite.com
- Prix BD des lycéens de la Guadeloupe
- Prize of the best international album during the 4e Festival international de la BD d'Alger in 2011

== Film adaptation ==
A film adaptation was made by Abdelatif Kechiche, with Léa Seydoux and Adèle Exarchopoulos in the main roles, released in 2013 under the title Blue Is the Warmest Colour. Like the book, it received great critical acclaim, winning several awards, including the Palme d'Or at the 2013 Cannes Film Festival.

While the first two thirds of the film are similar (with Clémentine renamed "Adèle"), the ending is different from the book: Adèle is still alive, and the two lovers split up due to what are strongly suggested to be irreconcilable differences.

== Translations ==
Sepideh Jodeyri, an Iranian poet in the Czech Republic, made a Persian translation, as Abi Garmtarin Rang Ast. Conservative groups in Iran criticised her. There was a plan for a debut of this translation in Tehran, but it was later canceled.
