= France (film) =

2021 film by Bruno Dumont

- Theatrical release poster
- Directed by: Bruno Dumont
- Written by: Bruno Dumont
- Produced by: Rachid Bouchareb; Jean Bréhat; Muriel Merlin
- Starring: Léa Seydoux; Blanche Gardin; Benjamin Biolay; Emanuele Arioli; Juliane Köhler; Gaëtan Amiel; Jewad Zemmar; Marc Bettinelli
- Cinematography: David Chambille
- Edited by: Nicolas Bier
- Music by: Christophe
- Production companies: 3B Productions; Arte; Red Balloon Film; Scope Pictures; Tea Time Film; Ciné+
- Distributed by: ARP Sélection
- Release dates: 15 July 2021 (Cannes); 25 August 2021 (France)
- Running time: 134 minutes
- Countries: France; Italy; Germany; Belgium
- Language: French
- Box office: $1.3 million

France is a 2021 comedy-drama film written and directed by Bruno Dumont. It stars Léa Seydoux, Blanche Gardin, Benjamin Biolay, Emanuele Arioli, Juliane Köhler, Gaëtan Amiel, Jewad Zemmar and Marc Bettinelli.

The film follows the life of a star television journalist caught in a spiral of events that will lead to her downfall. Between drama and comedy, France seeks to compare the intimate and public crisis of a young woman with a portrait of contemporary France. The film had its world premiere at the Cannes Film Festival on 15 July 2021. It was released in France on 25 August 2021 by ARP Selection.

== Synopsis ==
France de Meurs (Léa Seydoux) is the lead studio anchor and field reporter for a high-profile French television news program. Known for her charisma and reporting from global conflict zones, she maintains a public reputation as a fearless, objective journalist. Behind the camera, however, her priority shifts from strict journalistic integrity to the deliberate staging of her footage to maximize her personal brand. She is consistently encouraged in this practice by Lou (Blanche Gardin), her cynical assistant. This singular focus on her career heavily impacts her personal life, leaving her marriage to Fred, an author, and her relationship with their son, Jojo, highly strained.

One morning, while driving her son to school, France knocks down a young man on a scooter. The event is immediately exploited by social networks, and she realizes how fragile her popularity is. Sincerely affected by the fate of Baptiste, whom she has sent to hospital, she goes to visit him and decides to help his family, against her husband's advice. She then sinks into depression and decides to leave the news channel. She heads off to Bavaria, to a health resort in the heart of the snow-capped mountains, where she meets Charles Castro, a young man undergoing treatment. They begin an affair, and France is relieved to meet someone who doesn't know of her fame. However, she discovers that Charles is an unscrupulous journalist who has tricked her into falling in love with him for a magazine piece he is writing on her. Although the young man tells her he's really fallen in love with her, she violently rejects him.

Back in Paris, she resumes her job at the station, and endures harassment from Charles, who has become obsessed with her. She is not really cured of her depression. The sudden death of her husband and son in a car accident takes its toll on her, but strangely enough, after hitting rock bottom, she realizes that her previous problems were rather trivial, and decides to give Charles another chance, as he may be the only one left she can turn to.

== Cast ==
- Léa Seydoux as France de Meurs
- Blanche Gardin as Lou
- Benjamin Biolay as Fred de Meurs
- Emanuele Arioli as Charles Castro
- Juliane Köhler as Mme Arpel
- Gaëtan Amiel as Joseph de Meurs
- Jewad Zemmar as Baptiste
- Marc Bettinelli as Lolo
- Lucile Roche as Chouchou
- Noura Benbahlouli as Baptiste's mother
- Abdellah Chahouat as Baptiste's father
- Emmanuel Macron as Himself (archive footage, uncredited)

== Production ==
In May 2019, it was announced Léa Seydoux, Blanche Gardin and Benoît Magimel had joined the cast of the film, with Bruno Dumont directing from a screenplay he wrote. In June 2020, the film was re-titled from On a Half Clear Morning to France.

Principal photography began in October 2019. The film was shot in France (Paris and the Opal Coast), Germany (Bavaria) and Italy (Apulia and the ghost town of Craco, Basilicata).

== Release ==
The film had its world premiere at the Cannes Film Festival on 15 July 2021. It was released in France on 25 August 2021 by ARP Selection.

=== Critical reception ===
On the review aggregator website Rotten Tomatoes, 66% of 65 critics' reviews are positive, with an average rating of 6.3/10. The website's consensus reads: "France might have benefited from a more passionate approach to its themes, but Léa Seydoux leads an amusing send-up of celebrity culture." Metacritic, which uses a weighted average, assigned the film a score of 57 out of 100, based on 17 critics, indicating "mixed or average" reviews. In France, the film averages 3.3/5 on AlloCiné from 36 press reviews.
