= My Wife's Romance =

- Film poster
- French: Le roman de ma femme
- Directed by: Djamshed Usmonov
- Written by: Djamshed Usmonov; Veronique Marty
- Produced by: Denis Carot; Marie Masmonteil
- Starring: Olivier Gourmet; Léa Seydoux
- Cinematography: Lubomir Bakchev
- Music by: Pierre Aviat
- Production companies: Elzévir Films; Arte France Cinéma
- Distributed by: Ad Vitam Distribution
- Release date: 2 March 2011
- Running time: 100 minutes
- Country: France
- Language: French

My Wife's Romance (French: Le roman de ma femme) is a 2011 French drama film written and directed by Djamshed Usmonov and starring Olivier Gourmet and Léa Seydoux.

== Plot ==
Eve's husband Paul, disappears mysteriously one day and leaves behind a huge debt. As the police investigates the case, Paul's former associate Chollet offers Eve his support. Little later Chollet becomes himself a suspect.

== Cast ==
- Olivier Gourmet as Chollet
- Léa Seydoux as Eve
- Gilles Cohen as the police officer
- Maruf Pulodzoda as Amro
- Kseniya Rappoport as Amro's wife
- Thibault Vinçon as Alexandre
- Sacha Bourdo as the translator
