= Roses à crédit =

- Film poster
- Directed by: Amos Gitai
- Screenplay by: Amos Gitai; Marie-Jose Sanselme
- Based on: Roses à crédit by Elsa Triolet
- Produced by: Nicole Collet; Serge Moati
- Starring: Léa Seydoux; Grégoire Leprince-Ringuet
- Cinematography: Éric Gautier
- Edited by: Isabelle Ingold
- Music by: Louis Sclavis
- Production companies: Ad Vitam Production; Agav Films
- Distributed by: Ad Vitam Distribution
- Release dates: 9 September 2010 (TIFF); 8 November 2011 (France - TV premiere)
- Running time: 113 minutes
- Country: France
- Language: French

Roses à crédit (lit. 'Roses on credit') is a 2010 French drama film co-written and directed by Amos Gitai and starring Léa Seydoux and Grégoire Leprince-Ringuet. It is based on the 1959 novel of the same name by Elsa Triolet. It received its premiere at the 2010 Toronto International Film Festival.

== Plot ==
After the end of the World War, Marjoline, a beautiful teenager, arrives in Paris. Whilst working as a manicurist in a luxury salon, she meets and marries Daniel, a young horticulturalist. They receive a modern apartment as a wedding gift, however when furnishing it, Marjoline goes increasingly into debt against Daniel's will. As she feels the need to consume more and more, their marriage goes downhill.

== Cast ==
- Léa Seydoux as Marjoline
- Grégoire Leprince-Ringuet as Daniel
- Pierre Arditi as Monsieur Georges
- Arielle Dombasle as Madame Denise
- Catherine Jacob as Madame Donzert
- Maud Wyler as Cécile
- Valeria Bruni Tedeschi as Suzette
- André Wilms as Monsieur Donelle
- Ariane Ascaride as the doctor
- Florence Thomassin as Marie
- Elsa Zylberstein as the pharmacist
- Bruno Maquart as the investigator
- Max Denes as the real estate agent
- Louis Sclavis as the clarinettist
- Vincent Peirani as the accordionist

== Production ==
In order to secure a better budget and thus be able to deliver "quality and rich character development," director Amos Gitaï chose to make two versions of his film: one for television and a longer version for theatrical release, fifteen minutes longer than the TV version. The latter was scheduled to be released in theaters on December 15, 2010, five months before its television broadcast on France 2. However, two weeks before the release, the National Center for Cinema and the Moving Image (CNC) refused to grant its approval to the feature film, deeming that there were not enough differences between the two versions. This refusal of approval prevented the theatrical release because it deprived the film of subsidies.
