= The Masque of the Red Death (upcoming film) =

Upcoming film by Charlie Polinger

- Directed by: Charlie Polinger
- Screenplay by: Charlie Polinger
- Based on: "The Masque of the Red Death" by Edgar Allan Poe
- Produced by: Erik Feig; Julia Hammer; James Presson; Lucy McKendrick
- Starring: Mikey Madison; Léa Seydoux; Franz Rogowski; Benedict Wong
- Cinematography: Steven Breckon
- Edited by: Julia Bloch
- Music by: Johan Lenox
- Production companies: A24; Picturestart
- Distributed by: A24
- Release date: 2027
- Country: United States
- Language: English

The Masque of the Red Death is an upcoming American dark comedy film written and directed by Charlie Polinger. The film is a new adaptation of the 1842 short story by Edgar Allan Poe, adapting it with a more revisionist and darkly comedic tone. Mikey Madison and Léa Seydoux star in the film. A24 is set to distribute the film with initial plans to release in 2027.

== Cast ==
- Mikey Madison as Isabel / Duchess Margarita
- Léa Seydoux
- Franz Rogowski as Prince Prospero
- Benedict Wong

== Production ==
Charlie Polinger wrote his screenplay adaptation of Edgar Allan Poe's "The Masque of the Red Death", and it was later voted onto The Black List of the most popular unproduced screenplays at the end of 2023. The script maintained a medieval setting, but took a more revisionist and comedic tone. In January 2025, it was announced that Polinger would direct his screenplay, and A24 would distribute and co-produce with Picturestart. Polinger worked with Steven Breckon to shoot the film and Johan Lenox to provide the music, both of whom had collaborated with him on The Plague.

Plans initially had Sydney Sweeney starring in the film, but by June 2025, she dropped out of the project due to scheduling conflicts, and Mikey Madison replaced her. In January 2026, Léa Seydoux joined the cast alongside Madison. Franz Rogowski and Benedict Wong joined the cast in February.

Principal photography took place Budapest, Hungary in February 2026.

== Release ==
The film is planned for a 2027 release.
