= Liza, Liza, Skies Are Grey =

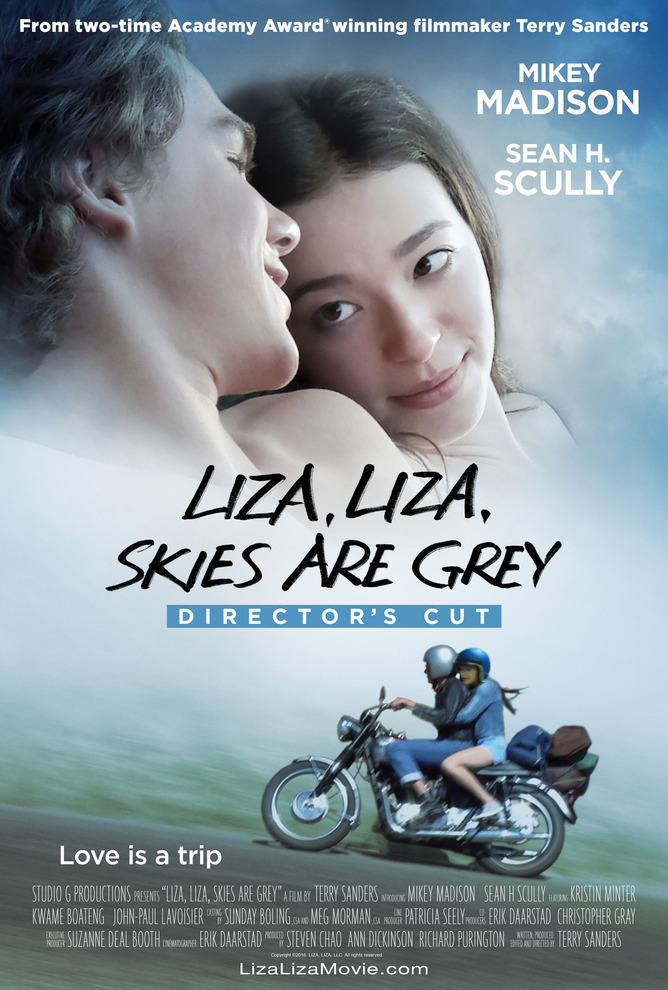
- Promotional poster
- Directed by: Terry Sanders
- Written by: Terry Sanders
- Produced by: Suzanne Deal Booth; Terry Sanders; Steven Chao; Ann Dickinson; Richard Purington; Patricia L. Seely
- Starring: Mikey Madison; Sean H. Scully
- Cinematography: Erik Daarstad
- Edited by: Terry Sanders
- Music by: Charles Bernstein
- Production company: American Film Foundation
- Distributed by: Ocean Releasing
- Release date: August 18, 2017
- Running time: 85 minutes
- Country: United States
- Language: English

Liza, Liza, Skies Are Grey is a 2017 American drama film written and directed by Terry Sanders and starring Mikey Madison in her film debut and Sean H. Scully. The film takes place in the summer of 1966, and focuses on a teenage couple taking a motorcycle trip along the coast of California.

== Plot ==
In the summer of 1966, 15-year-old Liza and her boyfriend, Brett, embark on a four-day road trip along the coast of California. Brett is moving away at the end of summer to live in New York with his father, and the young couple wish to lose their virginities to each other before then. Liza's mother disapproves of Brett because of his fraught family situation and pushes her daughter to suitors. Spurred by the societal shifts of this time, like the draft for the Vietnam War, civil rights movements across America, and the burgeoning sexual revolution, as well as their families splitting them apart, they take this trip in search of personal freedom and to ignore their bleak futures.

As they travel, they encounter various characters and situations that challenge their perceptions of love, independence, and responsibility, wrangling with the complexities of growing up. The movie ends with Liza and Brett having accomplished their goal, but still split apart as her mother berates her and takes her back to reality.

== Cast ==
- Mikey Madison as Liza
- Sean H. Scully as Brett
- Kristin Minter as Mother
- Kwame Boateng as Paul
- John-Paul Lavoisier as Harold
- Valarie Rae Miller as Teresa
- Marina Michelson as Pearl Rubenstein
- Sonya Eddy
- Robert John Brewer as Motel Manager
- Madison Iseman as Nancy
- Sergio Macian as Father

== Release ==
The film was released on August 18, 2017.

== Reception ==
The film has a 33% rating on Rotten Tomatoes based on 10 reviews. Alan Ng of Film Threat rated the film a 3 out of 5.

Sheri Linden of The Hollywood Reporter gave the film a negative review, calling it "a meandering journey, too tepid to stir up the feelings of yearning and rebellion that it aims to evoke."

Kimber Myers of the Los Angeles Times also gave the film a negative review and wrote, "With a résumé primarily populated by documentary films, two-time Oscar winner Sanders might be forgiven for issues with script and actors, but even the basics of filmmaking, such as editing and camerawork fall short."

Ben Kenigsberg of The New York Times also gave the film a negative review and wrote, "the question of whether the couple will consummate their relationship isn't a sufficient source of tension."

Positive reviews praised the intimate atmosphere and debut performance from star Mikey Madison. Barbara Shulgasser of Common Sense Media wrote "There's an overwhelming sweetness and tenderness here that will appeal as much to teens experiencing the usual growing pains as to adults for whom coming-of-age is a distant memory."

Serena Donadoni of The Village Voice wrote "Smitten with his characters, Sanders takes the elements of teen exploitation films and fashions a simple, placid return to innocence."
