= Blue Is the Warmest Colour =

2013 film by Abdellatif Kechiche

- Theatrical release poster
- French: La Vie d'Adèle
- Directed by: Abdellatif Kechiche
- Screenplay by: Abdellatif Kechiche; Ghalia Lacroix
- Based on: Blue Is the Warmest Color by Jul Maroh
- Produced by: Abdellatif Kechiche; Brahim Chioua; Vincent Maraval
- Starring: Léa Seydoux; Adèle Exarchopoulos
- Cinematography: Sofian El Fani
- Edited by: Albertine Lastera; Camille Toubkis; Sophie Brunet; Ghalia Lacroix; Jean-Marie Lengelle
- Production companies: Wild Bunch; Quat'sous Films; France 2 Cinéma; Scope Pictures; Vértigo Films; Radio Télévision Belge Francofone; Eurimages; Pictanovo
- Distributed by: Wild Bunch (France); Cinéart (Belgium); Vértigo Films (Spain)
- Release dates: 23 May 2013 (Cannes); 9 October 2013 (France, Belgium); 25 October 2013 (Spain)
- Running time: 180 minutes
- Countries: France; Belgium; Spain
- Language: French
- Budget: €4 million
- Box office: $19.5 million

Blue Is the Warmest Colour (French: La Vie d'Adèle – Chapitres 1 & 2, lit. 'The Life of Adèle: Chapters 1 & 2'; French pronunciation: [la vi dadɛl ʃapitʁ œ̃ e dø]) is a 2013 erotic romantic drama film co-written, co-produced, and directed by Abdellatif Kechiche and starring Léa Seydoux and Adèle Exarchopoulos. The film follows Adèle (Exarchopoulos), a French teenager, who discovers desire and freedom when Emma (Seydoux), an aspiring painter, enters her life. It depicts their sexual relationship from Adèle's high school years to her early adult life and career as a schoolteacher. The film's premise is based on the 2010 graphic novel of the same name by Jul Maroh.

Production began in March 2012 and lasted five months. Approximately 800 hours of footage were shot, including extensive B-roll footage, with Kechiche trimming the final cut to 180 minutes. The film generated controversy, much of it about allegations by the crew and lead actresses of poor working conditions on set and the film's explicit depiction of sexuality.

At the 2013 Cannes Film Festival, the film unanimously won the Palme d'Or from the official jury and the FIPRESCI Prize. It is the first film to have the Palme d'Or awarded to both the director and the lead actresses, with Seydoux and Exarchopoulos joining Jane Campion (The Piano), Julia Ducournau (Titane), and Justine Triet (Anatomy of a Fall) as the only women to have won the award. It received critical acclaim and was nominated for the Golden Globe Award for Best Non-English Language Film and the BAFTA Award for Best Film Not in the English Language. Many critics declared it one of the best films of 2013.

== Plot ==
Adèle is an introverted 15-year-old high-school student. She passes an older woman with short blue hair in the streets one day and is instantly attracted. She has sex with Thomas, a boy from school, losing her virginity, but is ultimately dissatisfied and ends their relationship. After having vivid sexual fantasies about the blue-haired woman while masturbating and kissing Béatrice, one of her female friends, Adèle becomes troubled about her sexual identity. Béatrice says she does not want to proceed further and tells Adèle to forget the kiss.

Adèle's friend, the openly gay Valentin, takes her to a gay dance bar. Adèle later leaves and enters a lesbian bar, where some women flirt with her. The blue-haired woman, art student Emma, is there and intervenes, claiming Adèle is her cousin. Emma and Adèle become friends. After Emma shows up at the school, Adèle's friends suspect her of being a lesbian and ostracise her.

Adèle and Emma grow closer and kiss at a picnic. They later have sex and begin a passionate sexual relationship. Emma's artsy family welcomes Adèle, but Adèle tells her conservative, working-class parents that Emma is her tutor for philosophy class. Some of Adèle's old friends attend her surprise 18th birthday party, but Emma does not.

In the years that follow, the two women move in together. Adèle becomes a kindergarten teacher, while Emma tries to advance her painting career by throwing frequent house parties. At one party, Adèle meets Emma's pregnant colleague Lise, gallery owner Joachim, and aspiring actor Samir. Samir discusses America with Adèle while the others discuss sex, and the two become friends. Emma spends more time at the party with Lise.

Emma belittles Adèle's career but encourages her to pursue writing, while Adèle insists she is happy the way she is. Their relationship grows tense as it becomes clear they have little in common besides their mutual physical attraction. Emma comes home late, having spent the evening working with Lise. Out of loneliness, Adèle has sex with a male colleague teacher named Antoine. Emma discovers the cheating and furiously breaks up with Adèle.

Three years later, the two meet at a restaurant. Adèle is happy with her job as an elementary school teacher but has not moved on: she is still deeply in love with Emma. Emma is in a committed partnership with Lise and helps raise Lise's three-year-old daughter, but admits that she does not feel sexually fulfilled. Emma and Adèle kiss, but Emma withdraws. She tells Adèle that she no longer loves her, but that their relationship was special and she will always have "infinite tenderness" for her. The two part with apologies and tears.

Adèle attends Emma's art exhibition. On one wall is a nude portrait of Adèle that Emma painted during their time together. Emma acknowledges Adèle but is focused on Lise and the other guests. Adèle congratulates Emma on her success and, after a brief conversation with Samir, leaves. He chases after her but goes in the wrong direction, while Adèle walks off into the distance.

== Cast ==
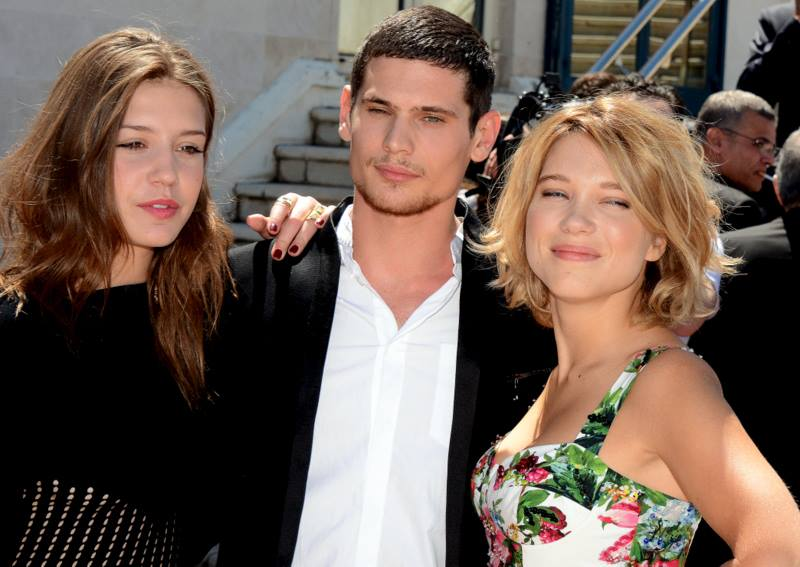
Main cast, from left to right: Adèle Exarchopoulos, Jérémie Laheurte and Léa Seydoux

- Léa Seydoux as Emma
- Adèle Exarchopoulos as Adèle
- Salim Kechiouche as Samir
- Aurélien Recoing as Adèle's father
- Catherine Salée as Adèle's mother
- Benjamin Siksou as Antoine
- Mona Walravens as Lise
- Alma Jodorowsky as Béatrice
- Jérémie Laheurte as Thomas
- Anne Loiret as Emma's mother
- Benoît Pilot as Emma's stepfather
- Sandor Funtek as Valentin
- Fanny Maurin as Amélie
- Maelys Cabezon as Laetitia
- Stéphane Mercoyrol as Joachim
- Aurelie Lemanceau as Sabine

== Themes and interpretations ==
=== Sexuality ===
Lesbian sexuality is one of the film's primary themes, as the narrative deals with Adèle's exploration of her identity in this context. But some academics have questioned the film's treatment of lesbian sexuality, given that it was directed by a heterosexual man. In Sight & Sound, film scholar Sophie Mayer suggests that in Blue is the Warmest Colour, "Like homophobia, the lesbian here melts away. As with many male fantasies of lesbianism, the film centers on the erotic success and affective failures of relations between women".

The issue of perspective was also addressed in a Film Comment review by Kristin M. Jones, who wrote, "Emma's supposedly sophisticated friends make eager remarks about art and female sexuality that seem to mirror the director's problematic approach toward the representation of women".

One critic has suggested that the film is not a lesbian film, highlighting the exploration of Adèle's bisexuality. Paulina Plazas wrote in IndieWire that throughout the film, bisexual erasure is "central to understanding Adèle's particular sense that she does not belong as she comes of age."

=== Social class ===
One recurring thematic element critics and audiences identified is the division of social class and the exploration of freedom and love between the two central characters. The social class division is clear in the two family dinner scenes, with Adèle's conservative, working-class family discussing comparatively banal subjects while Emma's more open-minded, middle-class family mainly discusses more existential matters: art, career, life and passion. Emma's family is aware of their lesbian relationship, while Adèle's conservative parents are led to believe the women are just friends.

Some critics have noted that class difference is an ongoing theme in Kechiche's filmography. One Film Comment critic wrote, "As in Kechiche's earlier work, social class, and the divisions it creates, are a vital thread; he even changed the first name of the story's passionate protagonist from Clémentine to that of his actress, partly because it means 'justice' in Arabic. His fascination and familiarity with the world of pedagogy, as shown here in Adèle's touching reverence for teaching, is another notable characteristic".

=== Food ===
Kechiche explores how food can evoke varying levels of symbolism, for instance through the sexually suggestive food metaphors of Adèle's liking the fat on ham and her learning to eat oysters from Emma. He also looks at how food can be indicative of social class.

== Production ==
=== Adaptation ===
Director and screenwriter Abdellatif Kechiche developed the premise for Blue Is the Warmest Colour while directing his second feature film, Games of Love and Chance (2003). He met teachers "who felt very strongly about reading, painting, writing" and was inspired to develop a script that charts the personal life and career of a female French teacher. But the concept was only finalized a few years later when Kechiche chanced upon Maroh's graphic novel and he saw how he could link his screenplay about a schoolteacher with Maroh's love story between two young women.

Although Maroh's story takes precedence in the adaptation, Adèle's character, named "Clémentine" in the book, differs from the original, as explored by Charles Taylor in The Yale Review: "The novel includes scenes of the girls being discovered in bed and thrown out of the house and speeches like What's horrible is that people kill each other for oil and commit genocide, not that they give their love to someone." In the film, Adèle's parents seem oblivious to her love affair with Emma and politely greet her under the impression that she is Adèle's philosophy tutor. Further themes are explored in Maroh's novel, such as addiction to prescription pills. Of his intention to portray young people, Kechiche said, "I almost wish I was born now, because young people seem to be much more beautiful and brighter than my generation. I want to pay them tribute."

=== Casting ===
In late 2011, a casting call was held in Paris to find the ideal actress for the role of Adèle. Casting director Sophie Blanvillain first spotted Adèle Exarchopoulos and then arranged for her to meet Kechiche. Exarchopoulos described how her auditions with Kechiche over the course of two months consisted of improvisation of scenarios, discussions, and sitting in a café, without talking, while he observed her. It was later, a day before the New Year, that Kechiche decided to offer Exarchopoulos the leading role in the film; he later said in an interview, "I chose Adèle the minute I saw her. I had taken her for lunch at a brasserie. She ordered lemon tart and when I saw the way she ate it I thought, 'It's her!'."

Léa Seydoux was cast as Emma ten months before principal photography began. Kechiche felt that Seydoux "shared her character's beauty, voice, intelligence and freedom" and that she has "something of an Arabic soul". He added, "What was decisive during our meeting was her take on society: She's very much tuned in to the world around her. She possesses a real social awareness, she has a real engagement with the world, very similar to my own. I was able to realise to how great an extent, as I spent a whole year with her between the time she was chosen for the role and the end of shooting." Speaking to IndieWire on the preparation for her role, Seydoux said, "During those ten months [before shooting] I was already meeting with him and being directed. We would spend hours talking about women and life; I also took painting and sculpting lessons, and read a lot about art and philosophy."

=== Filming ===
The film, originally planned to be shot in two and a half months, was shot in five months, from March to August 2012, with a budget of €4 million. Seven hundred and fifty hours of dailies were shot. Shooting took place in Lille, Roubaix, and Liévin.

In terms of cinematography, the shot/reverse shot scenes in the film were simultaneously shot with two different cameras. For Kechiche, this technique not only facilitates editing but also adds beauty to the scene that feels more truthful. Another characteristic aspect of Blue's cinematography is the predominance of close-ups. Cinematographer Sofian El Fani used the Canon EOS C300 camera with Angénieux zoom lenses, and the entire production was undertaken in a digital workflow.

=== Controversies ===
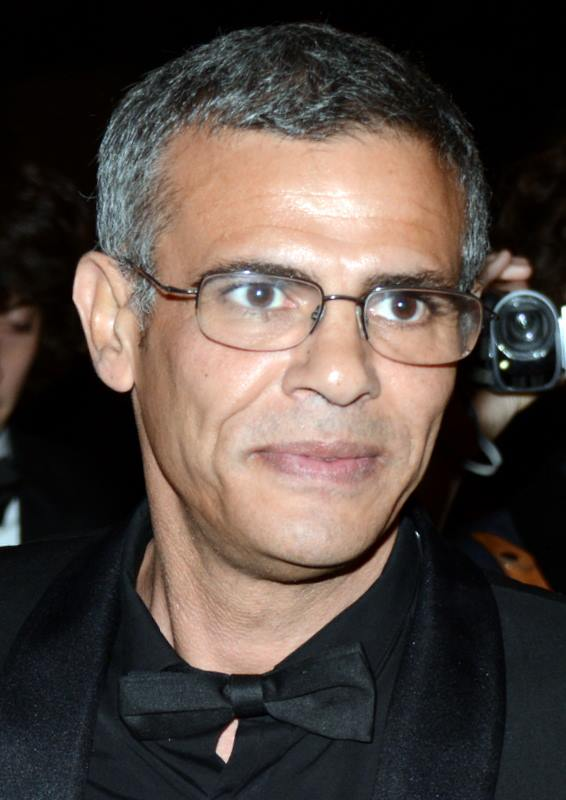
Director Abdellatif Kechiche at the 2013 Cannes Film Festival

Upon its premiere at the 2013 Cannes Festival, a report from the French Audiovisual and Cinematographic Union (Syndicat des professionnels de l'industrie de l'audiovisuel et du cinéma) criticised the crew's working conditions. According to the report, crew members said the production occurred in a "heavy" atmosphere with behaviour close to "moral harassment," which led some to quit. Further criticism targeted disrupted working patterns and salaries. Technicians accused Kechiche of harassment, unpaid overtime, and violations of labor laws.

In September 2013, Seydoux and Exarchopoulos also complained about Kechiche's behaviour during the shooting. They described the experience as "horrible" and said they would not work with him again. Exarchopoulos later said of the rift: "It was real, but it was not as big as it looks. For me, a shoot is a human adventure, and in every adventure you have some conflict." In a January 2014 interview, Seydoux said: "I'm still very happy with this film. It was hard to film it and maybe people think I was complaining and being spoiled, but that's not it. I just said it was hard. The truth is it was extremely hard but that's OK. I don't mind that it was hard. I like to be tested. Life is much harder. He's a very honest director and I love his cinema. I really like him as a director. The way he treats us? So what!"

In September 2013, Kechiche said the film should not be released. He told French magazine Télérama, "I think this film should not go out; it was too sullied", referring to the reports about his on-set behaviour.

== Style ==
The camerawork and many of Kechiche's directorial decisions give the film a true-to-life feel, which has led audiences to read meaning into it that they derive from their personal experiences. In The Yale Review, Charles Taylor wrote: "Instead of fencing its young lovers within a petting zoo... Kechiche removes the barriers that separate us from them. He brings the camera so close to the faces of his actresses that he seems to be trying to make their flesh more familiar to us than his own."

=== Significance of the colour blue ===
Blue Is the Warmest Colour is characterized by visual symbolism. The colour blue is used extensively throughout the film—from the lighting in the gay club Adèle visits to the dress she wears in the last scene and most notably in Emma's hair and eyes. For Adèle, blue represents emotional intensity, curiosity, love, and sadness. Adèle also references Pablo Picasso, who famously went through a melancholy Blue Period. As Emma grows out of her relationship with Adèle and their passion wanes, she removes the blue from her hair and adopts a more natural, conservative hairstyle.

=== Music ===
Reviewer Spencer Wolff noted Adèle's political stance, which changes as her life experiences change and reflect her alternating views: "Framed by black and Arab faces, Adèle marches in a protest to demand better funding for education. The music, 'On lâche rien' ('We will never give up!'), by the Algerian-born Kaddour Haddadi, is the official song of the French Communist Party. Yet, soon after she begins her relationship with Emma, we see Adèle marching again, hip-to-hip with her new lover, at a gay pride parade."

== Distribution ==
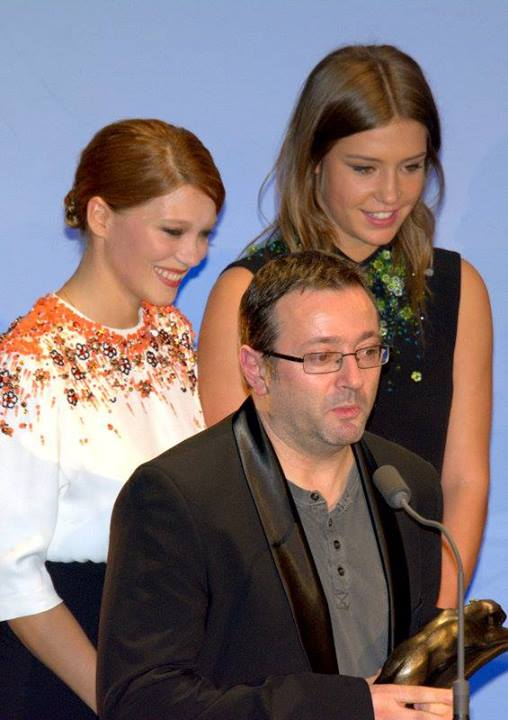
Lead actresses Léa Seydoux and Adèle Exarchopoulos and producer Vincent Maraval accepting the award for Best Film at the 19th Lumière Awards

=== Release ===
Blue Is the Warmest Colour had its world premiere at the 66th Cannes Film Festival on 23 May 2013. It received a standing ovation and ranked highest in critics' polls at the festival. In August 2013, the film had its North American premiere at the 2013 Telluride Film Festival. It was also screened in the Special Presentation section of the 2013 Toronto International Film Festival on 5 September 2013.

The film was screened in more than 131 territories and was commercially released on 9 October 2013 in France by Wild Bunch with a "12" rating. In the U.S., it was rated NC-17 by the Motion Picture Association of America for "explicit sexual content". It had a limited release at four theatres in New York City and Los Angeles on 25 October 2013, and expanded gradually in subsequent weeks. The film was released on 15 November 2013 in the United Kingdom and on 13 February 2014 in Australia and New Zealand.

=== Home media ===
La Vie d'Adèle – Chapitres 1 & 2 was released on Blu-ray Disc and DVD in France by Wild Side on 26 February 2014, and in North America, as Blue is the Warmest Color, through The Criterion Collection on 25 February 2014. As Blue Is the Warmest Colour, the film was also released on DVD and Blu-ray Disc in Canada on 25 February 2014 by Mongrel Media, in the United Kingdom on 17 March 2014 by Artificial Eye and on 18 June 2014, in Australia by Transmission Films.

In Brazil, as of 2014, Blu-ray manufacturing companies Sonopress and Sony DADC were refusing to produce the film because of its content. The distributor was struggling to reverse this situation.

== Reception ==
=== Box office ===
Blue Is the Warmest Colour grossed a worldwide total of $19,492,879. During its opening in France on 9 October 2013, the film debuted with a weekend total of $2.3 million on 285 screens for a $8,200 per-screen average. It took the fourth spot in its first weekend, which was seen as a "notably good showing because of its nearly three-hour length".

The film had a limited release in the U.S. and it grossed an estimated $101,116 in its first weekend ending 25 October 2013, with an average of $25,279 for four theatres in New York City and Los Angeles. The film grossed $2,199,787 in the U.S. theatrically. It had greater success in the U.S. home entertainment market, generating more than $3,500,000 in U.S. Blu-ray/DVD sales alone.

=== Critical response ===
On review aggregation website Rotten Tomatoes, 89% of 204 critics have given the film a positive review, with an average rating of 8.20/10. The site's critical consensus is: "Raw, honest, powerfully acted, and deliciously intense, Blue Is the Warmest Colour offers some of modern cinema's most elegantly composed, emotionally absorbing drama." On Metacritic, which assigned a score of 90 averaged from 57 reviews, the film received "universal acclaim".

More than 40 critics named the film as one of the ten best of 2013. In 2016, the film was named the 45th best film of the 21st century in a poll of 177 film critics from around the world. In France, Cahiers du cinéma placed the film third on its 2013 Top Ten chart.

In The Daily Telegraph, Robbie Collin awarded the film a maximum of five stars and tipped it to win the Palme d'Or. He wrote: "Kechiche's film is three hours long, and the only problem with that running time is that I could have happily watched it for another seven. It is an extraordinary, prolonged popping-candy explosion of pleasure, sadness, anger, lust and hope, and contained within it – although only just – are the two best performances of the festival, from Adèle Exarchopoulos and Léa Seydoux." Writing for The Guardian, Peter Bradshaw added that "it is genuinely passionate film-making" and changed his star rating for the film to five out of five stars after previously having awarded it only four. Stephen Garrett of The New York Observer wrote that the film was "nothing less than a triumph" and "a major work of sexual awakening".

Andrew Chan of the Film Critics Circle of Australia wrote, "Not unlike Wong Kar-wai's most matured effort in cinema, Happy Together, director Abdellatif Kechiche knows love and relationship well and the details he goes about everything is almost breathtaking to endure. There is a scene in the restaurant where two meet again, after years of separation, the tears that dwell on their eyes shows precisely how much they love each other, yet there is no way they will be together again. Blue Is the Warmest Colour is likely to be 2013's most powerful film and easily one of the best."

==== Concerns about graphic sex ====
At Cannes, the film shocked some critics with its long and graphic sex scenes (although fake genitalia were used), leading them to speculate that it might require editing before screening in cinemas. Several critics considered the film the front-runner to win the Palme d'Or. The judging panel, which included Steven Spielberg, Ang Lee, and Nicole Kidman, made an unprecedented move to award the Palme d'Or to the film's two main actresses along with the director. Jury President Spielberg said:

The film is a great love story that made all of us feel privileged to be a fly on the wall, to see this story of deep love and deep heartbreak evolve from the beginning. The director did not put any constraints on the narrative and we were absolutely spellbound by the amazing performances of the two actresses, and especially the way the director observed his characters and just let the characters breathe.

Justin Chang, writing for Variety, said that the film contains "the most explosively graphic lesbian sex scenes in recent memory".

In The Australian, David Stratton wrote, "If the film were just a series of sex scenes it would, of course, be problematic, but it's much, much more than that. Through the eyes of Adèle we experience the breathless excitement of first love and first physical contact, but then, inevitably, all the other experiences that make life the way it is ... All of these are beautifully documented".

Manohla Dargis of The New York Times called the film "wildly undisciplined" and overlong, and wrote that it "feels far more about Mr. Kechiche's desires than anything else".

Conversely, Richard Brody wrote in The New Yorker: "The problem with Kechiche's scenes is that they're too good—too unusual, too challenging, too original—to be assimilated ... to the familiar moviegoing experience. Their duration alone is exceptional, as is their emphasis on the physical struggle, the passionate and uninhibited athleticism of sex, the profound marking of the characters' souls by their sexual relationship."

==== LGBT and feminist response ====
The film received LGBT and feminist criticism for the perceived dominance of the male gaze and lack of female gaze, with some reviewers calling it a "patriarchal gaze." After a test screening of selected scenes for a lesbian audience, one viewer said that it was "hot at the beginning, and then it got ridiculous when they kept switching sex positions every ten seconds" and that it was like an infomercial designed to address all the sexual acts lesbians can engage in. The depiction of scissoring was also debated.

Jul Maroh, the author of the graphic novel upon which the film was based, said, "It appears to me this was what was missing on the set: lesbians." While praising Kechiche's originality, calling his adaptation "coherent, justified and fluid ... a masterstroke", Maroh also felt that he failed to capture the lesbian heart of the story, and disapproved of the sex scenes. In a blog post, Maroh called the scenes "a brutal and surgical display, exuberant and cold, of so-called lesbian sex, which turned into porn, and made me feel very ill at ease", saying that in the movie theatre, "the hetero-normative laughed because they don't understand it and find the scene ridiculous. The gay and queer people laughed because it's not convincing, and found it ridiculous. And among the only people we didn't hear giggling were the potential guys too busy feasting their eyes on an incarnation of their fantasies on screen". Maroh added, "as a feminist and lesbian spectator, I cannot endorse the direction Kechiche took on these matters. But I'm also looking forward to hearing what other women will think about it. This is simply my personal stance."

== Accolades ==
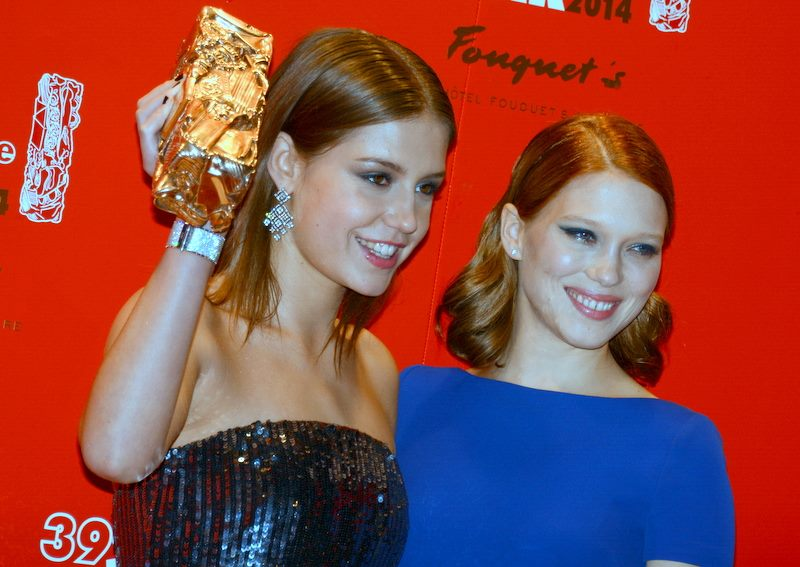
Exarchopoulos and Seydoux at the 2014 César Awards

The film won the Palme d'Or at the 2013 Cannes Film Festival. Exarchopoulos and Seydoux also received the Palme as a special prize. Kechiche dedicated the award to "the youth of France" and the Tunisian Revolution, where "they have the aspiration to be free, to express themselves and love in full freedom". At Cannes it also won the FIPRESCI Prize. This was also the first film adapted from a graphic novel or a comic to win the Palme d'Or. In December 2013, it received the Louis Delluc Prize for best French film.

The film was nominated for the Best Foreign Language Film award at the 71st Golden Globe Awards and the BAFTA Award for Best Film Not in the English Language.

At the 39th César Awards, the film received eight nominations, with Exarchopoulos winning the César Award for Most Promising Actress.

== See also ==
- List of French films of 2013
- List of LGBTQ-related films of 2013
