= Mikey Madison =

American actress (born 1999)

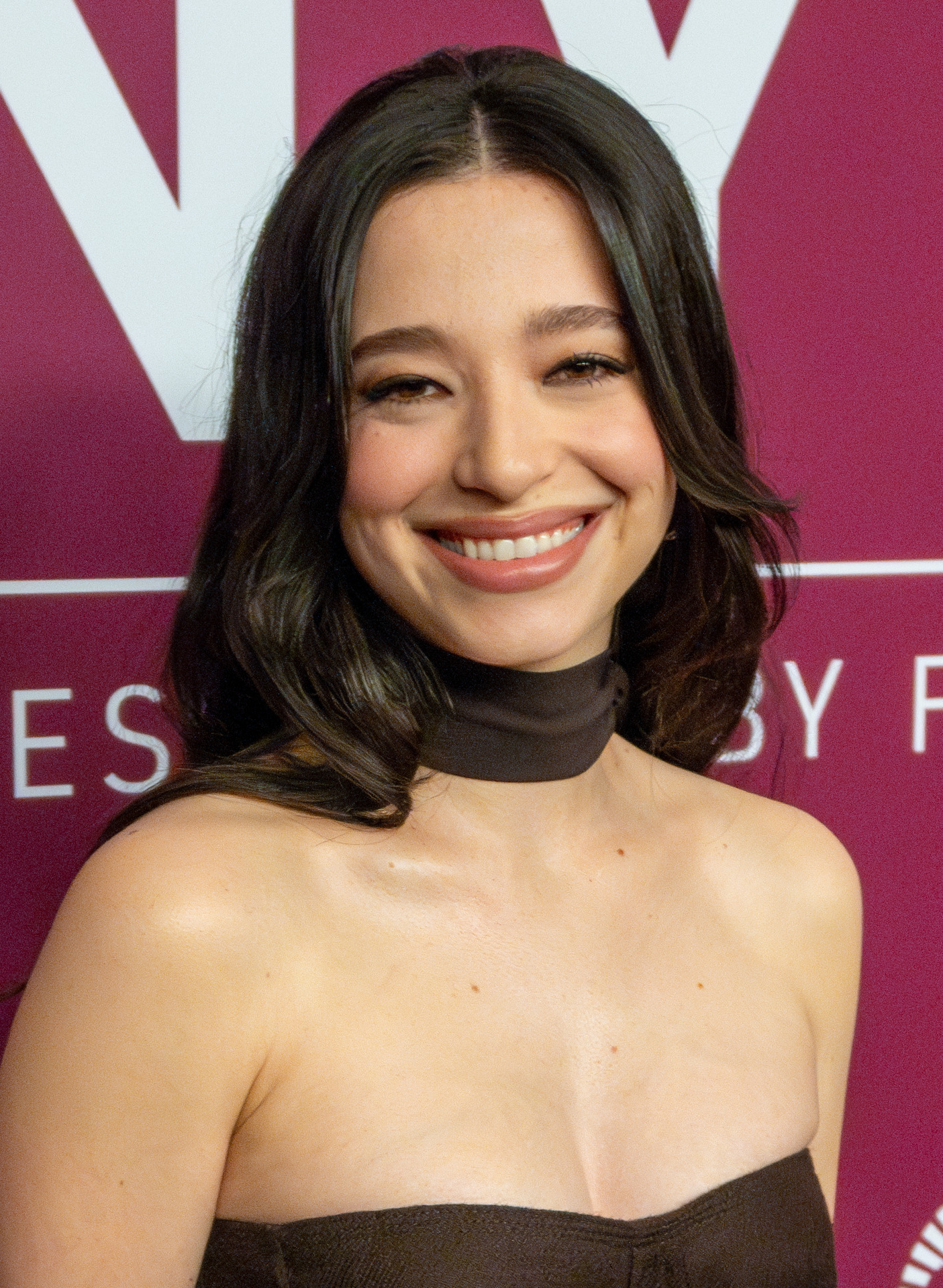
- Madison in 2024
- Born: Mikaela Madison Rosberg; March 25, 1999 (age 27); Los Angeles, California, U.S.
- Occupation: Actress
- Years active: 2013–present
- Awards: Full list

Mikaela Madison Rosberg (born March 25, 1999), known professionally as Mikey Madison, is an American actress. Her accolades include an Academy Award and a BAFTA Award, in addition to nominations for two Actor Awards, three Critics' Choice Awards, and a Golden Globe Award.

Madison began her acting career as a teenager with roles in short films. Her first major role came as a sullen teenager in the FX comedy series Better Things (2016–2022). She made her film debut with a starring role in Liza, Liza, Skies Are Grey (2017), followed by supporting roles in Quentin Tarantino's Once Upon a Time in Hollywood (2019) and the slasher film Scream (2022). Madison's breakthrough role as the strong-willed sex worker in Sean Baker's character drama Anora (2024) received widespread acclaim and earned her the Academy Award for Best Actress and BAFTA Award for Best Actress in a Leading Role.

== Early life ==
Mikaela Madison Rosberg was born on March 25, 1999, in Los Angeles, California, as the third daughter and fourth of five children of Michael and Tracy Rosberg. Both of her parents are psychologists: her father specialized in schizophrenia and her mother in child psychology. She has two brothers, one of whom is her twin, and two older sisters.

Madison lived in Santa Clarita, a Los Angeles suburb, for the first few years of her life before her family moved to the Woodland Hills neighborhood of Los Angeles. She was raised in the San Fernando Valley. Madison initially trained as a competitive horseback rider before switching to acting at age 14. She was homeschooled after the seventh grade. Her grandmother's cousin was a Texas cowboy named Clarence Hailey Long Jr., who appeared on the cover of the August 1949 issue of Life magazine, which served as the main inspiration for the Marlboro Man. She grew up watching films directed by Woody Allen, Quentin Tarantino, Sofia Coppola, and Martin Scorsese.

Madison is Jewish, and she was raised in a secular household.

In several interviews, she has discussed her social struggles, difficulties making eye contact, and being overstimulated by loud noises.

== Career ==
=== 2013–2023: Early work ===
Madison made her acting debut in 2013, appearing in the short films Retirement and Pani's Box. In 2014, after appearing in the short film Bound for Greatness, she filmed her first feature film, Liza, Liza, Skies Are Grey, which was not released until 2017.

In 2016, Madison began a starring role as Max Fox, a sullen teenager, in the FX comedy-drama series Better Things created by Louis C.K. and Pamela Adlon, which ran until 2022. From 2017 to 2018, she guest starred in the Bravo dark comedy series Imposters. In 2018, she appeared in the drama films Monster and Nostalgia.

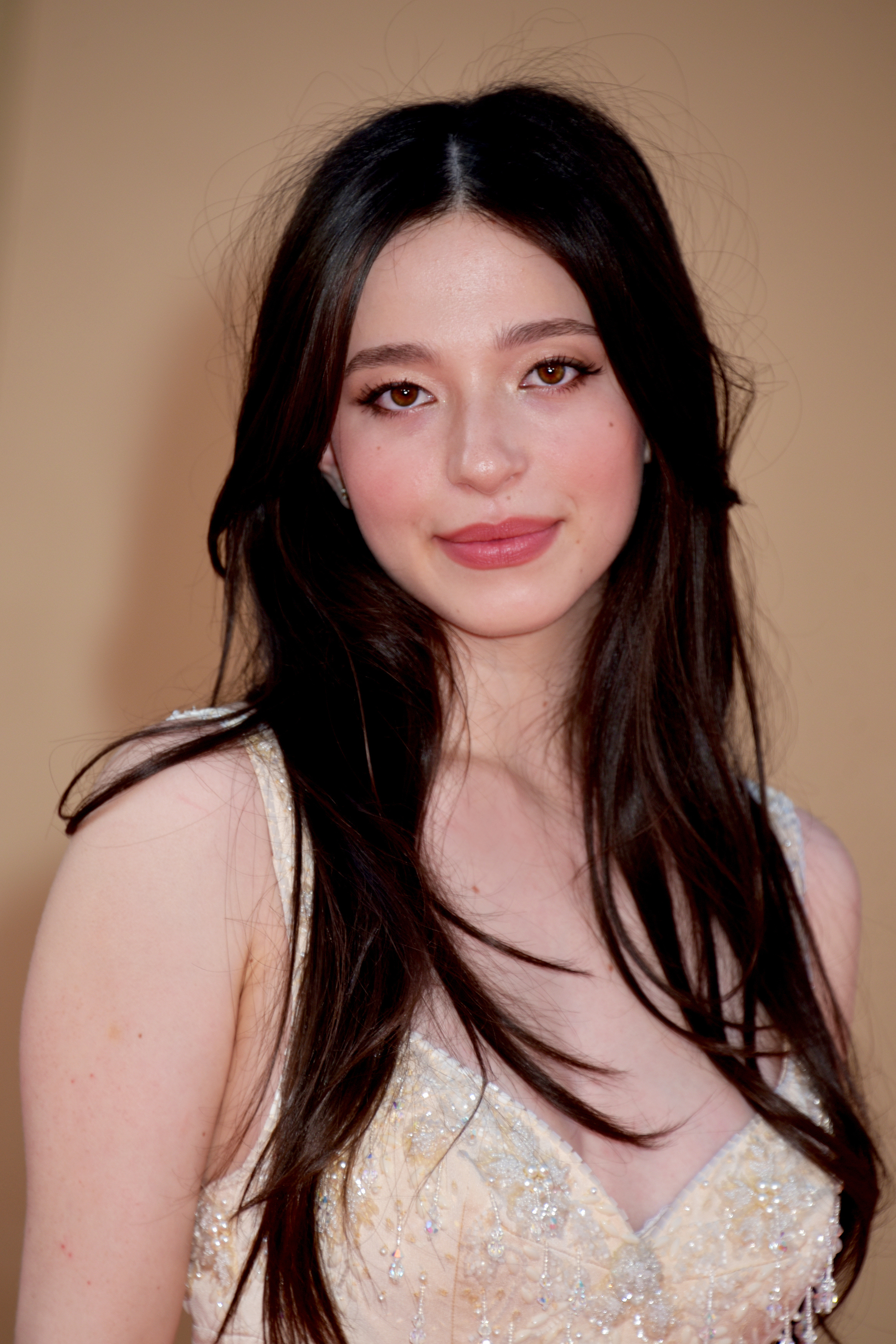
Madison in 2019

Madison earned recognition for her role as the Manson Family member Susan "Sadie" Atkins in Quentin Tarantino's period drama film Once Upon a Time in Hollywood, which premiered at the 2019 Cannes Film Festival and was a commercial success. Also in 2019, she had a voice role as Candi, the Barista, in the animated black comedy film The Addams Family.

The following year, Madison was cast as Amber Freeman in Scream, the fifth film of the Scream franchise, which was directed by Matt Bettinelli-Olpin and Tyler Gillett. The film was released in 2022 to critical and commercial success, becoming the 28th-highest-grossing film of its year. Writing for The A.V. Club, Katie Rife called Madison a standout performer in the film. In 2024, Madison had a supporting role in the miniseries Lady in the Lake.

=== 2024–present: Breakthrough ===
Filmmaker Sean Baker cast Madison in the comedy-drama film Anora as the titular stripper and sex worker. He cast her without an audition after watching her performances in Once Upon a Time in Hollywood and Scream, and wrote the character specifically for her. For the role, she studied Russian and performed her own stunts, including two fight scenes. She also learned pole dancing and temporarily relocated to Brighton Beach, the neighborhood setting of the film, in preparation for the film. The film premiered at the 2024 Cannes Film Festival to critical acclaim, winning the Palme d'Or. It became a critical and commercial success, and Madison was praised for her performance. Richard Lawson of Vanity Fair praised Madison's Brooklyn accent and found her performance "big and vivid, brash but charming". Her performance won her the Academy Award for Best Actress and the BAFTA Award for Best Actress in a Leading Role, in addition to nominations for a Golden Globe and a SAG Award in the same category. In March 2025, she guest hosted an episode of the live sketch comedy show Saturday Night Live.

Following her Oscar win, Madison was in brief negotiations to appear in Resident Evil, Sgt. Rock, and Star Wars: Starfighter. In May 2025, Madison was cast in the film Reptilia, to be directed by Alejandro Landes. In June, she was reported to be negotiating a starring role in The Masque of the Red Death for A24. In September, she was cast as whistleblower Frances Haugen in The Social Reckoning, a follow-up to 2010's The Social Network, released on October 9, 2026. In November, Madison was announced as part of the ensemble cast of Elijah Bynum's My Darling California.

== Personal life ==
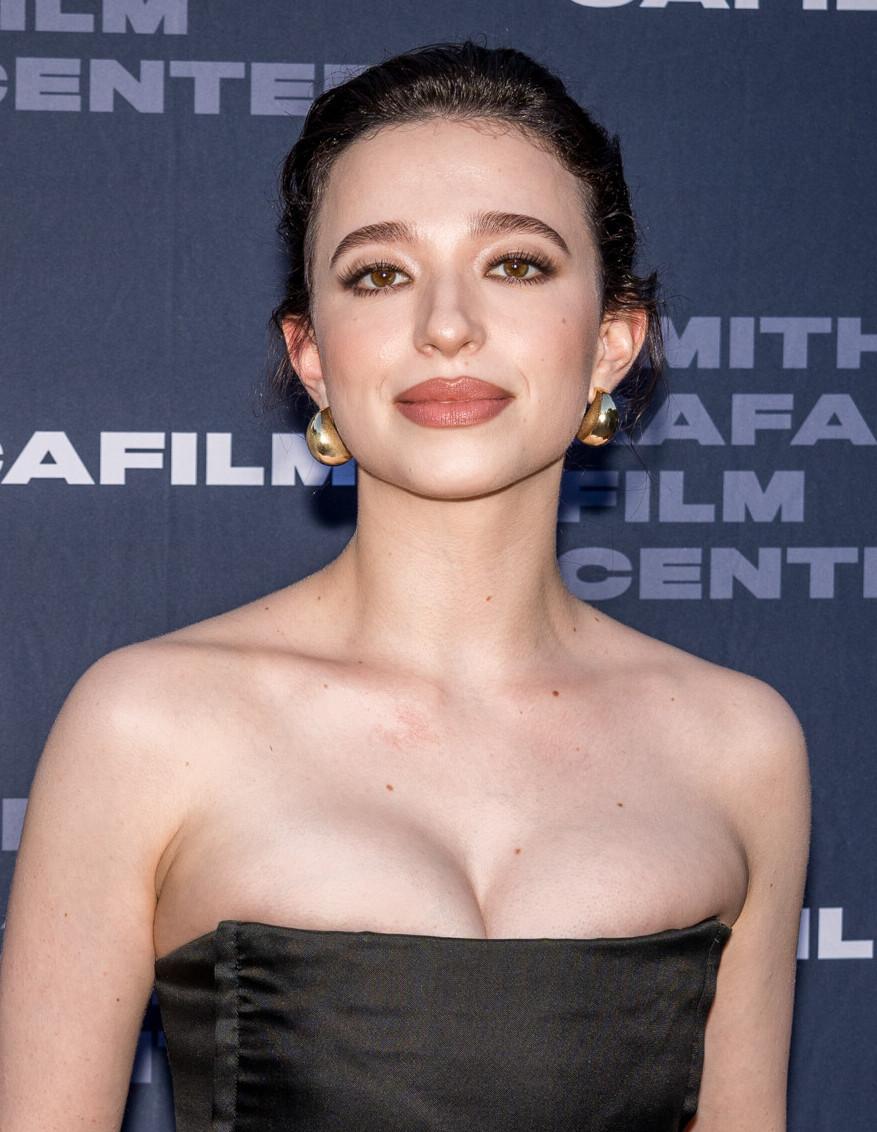
Madison in 2024

Madison lives in her native Los Angeles. She is a vegan and owns three Chihuahua dogs named Strawberry Jam, Birdie and Peaches, as well as a cat and two donkeys. Madison does not use social media, saying in an interview that it does not feel "authentic or natural" to her and that she would not "have anything very impactful to add" to social media. She added that she is a "very sensitive person" who believes people should not read what others are saying about them and thus keeps herself "ignorant to that part of the internet" for her mental health. She describes herself as non-religious but a "very spiritual person".

== Filmography ==
=== Film ===
Key
†	Denotes films that have not yet been released

Year	Title	Role	Notes	Ref.
2017	Liza, Liza, Skies Are Grey	Liza		
2018	Nostalgia	Kathleen		
2018	Monster	Alexandra Floyd		
2019	Once Upon a Time in Hollywood	Susan "Sadie" Atkins		
2019	The Addams Family	Candi the Barista	Voice	
2021	It Takes Three	Kat Walker		
2022	Scream	Amber Freeman		
2023	All Souls	River		
2024	Anora	Anora "Ani" Mikheeva		
2026	The Social Reckoning	Frances Haugen		
2027	The Masque of the Red Death †	Isabel / Duchess Margarita	Post-production	
TBA	My Darling California †	Jodie Taylor	Filming	

=== Television ===
Year	Title	Role	Notes	Ref.
2016–2022	Better Things	Maxine "Max" Fox	Main role	
2017–2018	Imposters	Young Maddie	2 episodes	
2024	Lady in the Lake	Judith Weinstein	Miniseries	
2025	Saturday Night Live	Herself (host)	Episode: "Mikey Madison/Morgan Wallen"	

== Awards and nominations ==
=== Major associations ===
Award	Year	Category	Work	Result	Ref.
Academy Awards	2025	Best Actress	Anora	Won	
Actor Awards	2025	Outstanding Female Actor in a Leading Role	Anora	Nominated	
Actor Awards	2025	Outstanding Cast in a Motion Picture	Anora	Nominated	
British Academy Film Awards	2025	Best Actress in a Leading Role	Anora	Won	
British Academy Film Awards	2025	Rising Star Award	—N/a	Nominated	
Critics' Choice Movie Awards	2020	Best Acting Ensemble	Once Upon a Time in Hollywood	Nominated	
Critics' Choice Movie Awards	2025	Best Actress	Anora	Nominated	
Critics' Choice Movie Awards	2025	Best Acting Ensemble	Anora	Nominated	
Golden Globe Awards	2025	Best Actress in a Motion Picture – Musical or Comedy	Anora	Nominated	

=== Other awards ===
Year	Award	Category	Work	Result	Ref.
2019	Capri Hollywood International Film Festival	Best Ensemble Cast	Once Upon a Time in Hollywood	Won	
2024	Astra Film Awards	Best Actress	Anora	Nominated	
2024	Boston Society of Film Critics	Best Actress	Anora	Won	
2024	Chicago Film Critics Association	Best Actress	Anora	Nominated	
2024	Deauville American Film Festival	Hollywood Rising-Star Award	—N/a	Won	
2024	Dublin Film Critics Circle	Best Actress	Anora	Won	
2024	Gotham Awards	Outstanding Lead Performance	Anora	Nominated	
2024	Los Angeles Film Critics Association	Best Lead Performance	Anora	Won (Note: Shared with Marianne Jean-Baptiste for Hard Truths.)	
2024	Mill Valley Film Festival	MVFF Breakthrough Performance Award	Anora	Won	
2024	National Board of Review	Breakthrough Performance	Anora	Won	
2024	New York Film Critics Online	Best Actress	Anora	Nominated	
2024	San Diego Film Critics Society	Best Actress	Anora	Nominated	
2024	San Diego Film Critics Society	Breakthrough Performance	Anora	Won	
2024	San Francisco Bay Area Film Critics Circle	Best Actress	Anora	Nominated	
2024	SCAD Savannah Film Festival	Breakthrough Award	—N/a	Won	
2024	Seattle Film Critics Society	Best Actress	Anora	Won	
2024	St. Louis Film Critics Association	Best Actress	Anora	Won	
2024	Toronto Film Critics Association	Outstanding Lead Performance	Anora	Won	
2024	Virginia Film Festival	Achievement in Acting Award	Anora	Won	
2024	Washington D.C. Area Film Critics Association	Best Actress	Anora	Won	
2025	AACTA International Awards	Best Actress	Anora	Nominated	
2025	Alliance of Women Film Journalists	Best Actress	Anora	Nominated	
2025	Alliance of Women Film Journalists	Best Women's Breakthrough Performance	Anora	Won	
2025	Georgia Film Critics Association	Best Actress	Anora	Won	
2025	Independent Spirit Awards	Best Lead Performance	Anora	Won	
2025	Irish Film & Television Awards	Best International Actress	Anora	Nominated	
2025	National Society of Film Critics	Best Actress	Anora	Runner-up	
2025	Online Film Critics Society	Best Actress	Anora	Won	
2025	Palm Springs International Film Festival	Breakthrough Performance Award	Anora	Won	
2025	Satellite Awards	Best Actress in a Motion Picture – Comedy or Musical	Anora	Nominated	

== See also ==
- List of youngest Academy Award winners for Best Actress
- List of Jewish Academy Award winners and nominees
- List of Generation Z Academy Award winners and nominees
