= Léa Seydoux =

French actress (born 1985)

- Seydoux in 2026
- Born: Léa Hélène Seydoux-Fornier de Clausonne; 1 July 1985 (age 41); Paris, France
- Occupation: Actor
- Years active: 2004–present
- Partner: Tommaso Bertani (2023–present)
- Children: 2
- Family: Seydoux
- Awards: Dame of the Ordre des Arts et des Lettres; Dame of the National Order of Merit

Léa Hélène Seydoux-Fornier de Clausonne (Note: French: [lea sɛdu]) (born 1 July 1985) is a French actress who has appeared in both French cinema and Hollywood productions. She has been nominated for five César Awards, two Lumière Awards, a Palme d'Or and a BAFTA Award. In 2009, she won the Trophée Chopard Award for Female Revelation of the Year at the Cannes Film Festival. In 2016, she was honoured with appointment as a Dame of the Order of Arts and Letters. In 2022, the French government made her a Dame of the National Order of Merit. In 2026, the Académie des César announced that she will be the president of the 52nd César Awards ceremony, to be held on February 25, 2027.

She began her acting career with her film debut in Girlfriends (2006), with early roles in The Last Mistress (2007) and On War (2008). She won acclaim for her French roles in The Beautiful Person (2008), Belle Épine (2010), and Farewell, My Queen (2012). During this time, she expanded her career appearing in supporting roles in high-profile Hollywood films, including Quentin Tarantino's Inglourious Basterds (2009), Ridley Scott's Robin Hood (2010), Woody Allen's Midnight in Paris (2011) and the action film Mission: Impossible – Ghost Protocol (2011).

Her breakthrough role came with the controversial and acclaimed film Blue Is the Warmest Colour (2013) for which she received the Lumière Award for Best Actress, as well as the Palme d'Or at the Cannes Film Festival along with her co-star Adèle Exarchopoulos and director Abdellatif Kechiche. She received her second Lumière Award within the same year for the film Grand Central. She gained international attention for her role as Bond girl Madeleine Swann in Spectre (2015), and No Time to Die (2021).

She has appeared in the Wes Anderson films The Grand Budapest Hotel (2014) and The French Dispatch (2021). Other notable roles include Beauty and the Beast (2014), Saint Laurent (2014), The Lobster (2015), Zoe (2018), France (2021), Crimes of the Future (2022), One Fine Morning (2022), The Beast (2023), Dune: Part Two (2024), and the video games Death Stranding (2019) and Death Stranding 2: On the Beach (2025).

Seydoux has also worked as a model. She has been showcased in Vogue Paris, American Vogue, L'Officiel, Another Magazine and W magazine, among others. Since 2016, she has been a brand ambassador for Louis Vuitton.

== Early life ==
Léa Hélène Seydoux-Fornier de Clausonne was born on 1 July 1985, in Passy, in the 16th arrondissement of Paris, to parents of partly Alsatian heritage. Her father, Henri Jérôme Seydoux-Fornier de Clausonne, is the founder and CEO of the French wireless company Parrot. Her mother, Valérie Schlumberger, is a philanthropist and former actress who has founded several charitable organisations, including a centre for homeless children in Senegal. Seydoux is one of seven children; her siblings and half-siblings include the stylist Camille Seydoux.

The Seydoux family is widely known in France and is influential in the film industry. Seydoux's grandfather, Jérôme Seydoux, is the chairman of the production company Pathé; her great-uncle, Nicolas Seydoux, is the chairman of the film studio Gaumont; and her other great-uncle, Michel Seydoux, is a film producer and was the former chairman of the football club Lille OSC. Seydoux's godfather is the footwear designer Christian Louboutin. In 2013, responding to suggestions that her family connections helped her career, Seydoux said her family "never lifted a finger" to help her, and that she never asked for their assistance. She said her grandfather had no interest in her acting career. (Note: Attributed to multiple references:)

Seydoux grew up in Saint-Germain-des-Prés, in the 6th arrondissement of Paris. Her parents divorced when she was three years old and often traveled for work, which left the young Seydoux feeling "very lonely" and like an orphan; she also felt like a "misfit" during her youth. Seydoux had a "strict" Protestant upbringing, but stated in 2011 that she is not religious. As a child, she wanted to be an opera singer and studied music at the Conservatoire de Paris. (Note: Attributed to multiple references:) However, she abandoned singing because she found it too difficult, and because she was a shy child. (Note: Attributed to multiple references:) For six years, Seydoux went to summer camp in Maryland, United States, at the behest of her father, who wanted her to learn English.

== Career ==
=== 2005–2007: Career beginnings ===
At age 18, Seydoux decided to become an actress. One of her close friends was an actor, and Seydoux has said: "I found his life wonderful ... you can travel, you're free, you can do what you want, you're the boss.'" An alternate story is that she fell in love with an actor and decided to become an actress to impress him. Years later, Seydoux revealed that this actor was her longtime friend, Louis Garrel. She took acting classes at the French drama school Les Enfants Terribles, having Jean-Bernard Feitussi as her close friend and mentor, and in 2007 she took further training at New York's Actors Studio with Corinne Blue.

In 2005, Seydoux appeared in the music video for Raphaël's single "Ne partons pas fâchés". The following year, she appeared in an award-winning ad for Levi’s jeans. Her first major screen role was in the 2006 French-Belgian comedy film Girlfriends. Seydoux then starred in Nicolas Klotz's short film La Consolation, which was shown at the 2007 Cannes Film Festival.

In these years, she also did her first work as a model for American Apparel, posing for their Pantytime campaign, and had a role in the films 13 French Street and The Last Mistress.

=== 2008–2012: French cinema and Hollywood expansion ===
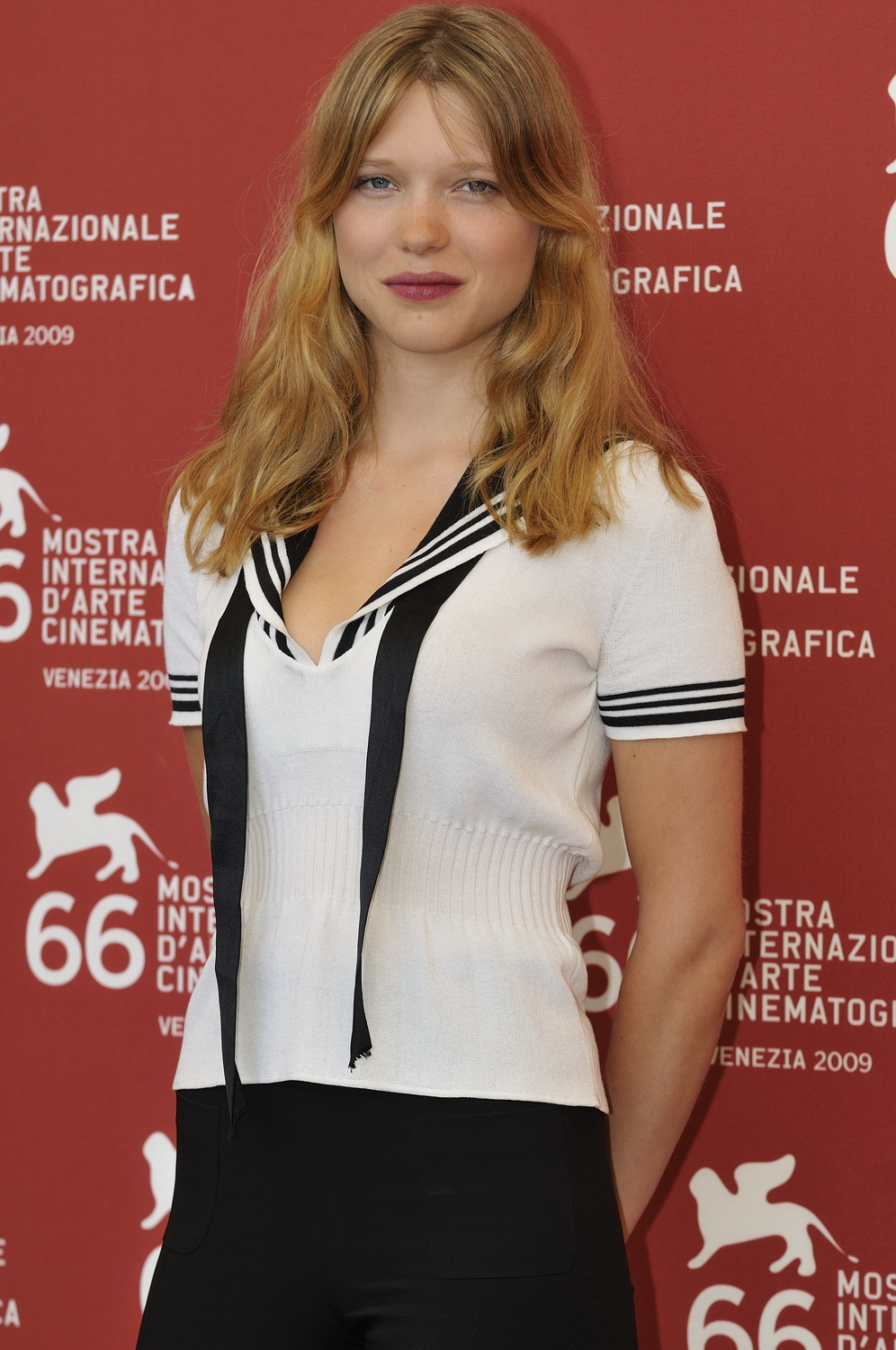
Seydoux at the 66th Venice International Film Festival in 2009

Seydoux came to widespread attention in 2008, when she appeared in Christophe Honoré's The Beautiful Person, a role that earned her the 2009 Chopard Award at the Cannes Film Festival for Best Upcoming Actress and a César Award nomination for Most Promising Actress.

In 2009, she had a major part in Jessica Hausner's Lourdes, and a small role in her first Hollywood film, Quentin Tarantino's Inglourious Basterds. In 2010, she starred alongside Russell Crowe in Ridley Scott's Robin Hood, playing Isabella of Angoulême. That same year, she appeared in Louis Garrel's short-film Petit Tailleur, Rebecca Zlotowski's Belle Épine, which earned her a second César Award nomination for Most Promising Actress, and Raúl Ruiz's Mysteries of Lisbon. Seydoux auditioned and was one of the four finalists, to play Lisbeth Salander in The Girl With the Dragon Tattoo, but the part ultimately went to actress Rooney Mara. Seydoux recalled in an interview: "I got upset, but I don't think I'd be able to do anything to get that part. It was totally against my nature. I worked hard, but Lisbeth was almost anorexic. I wasn't like that".

Seydoux admitted to having had an anxiety crisis during the 2009 Cannes Film Festival, saying: 'I'll never be Sophie Marceau, I'm too weird'. Later, she stated: "In the middle of the Cannes hysteria, I felt fragile and vulnerable. I made this comparison because I'll never be France's "petite fiancée". Sophie Marceau represents anything, while I don't have a definite place.

In 2011, she played Gabrielle in the romantic comedy Midnight in Paris. Later, Seydoux participated in another Hollywood production, Mission: Impossible – Ghost Protocol, in which she played the assassin Sabine Moreau alongside stars Tom Cruise and Jeremy Renner. She also played Elle in the short-film Time Doesn't Stand Still by Benjamin Millepied and Asa Mader. After Mission: Impossible, Seydoux returned to French cinema, starring in My Wife's Romance (Le Roman de ma femme) and Roses à crédit.

More generally, Léa Seydoux's career accelerated from 2012 and allowed the actress to choose her projects from the offers she received, without necessarily having to go through screen tests. According to the specialist press, the young woman then appeared as one of the "essential French actresses in Hollywood", and even as "the most sought-after actress of her generation", who at only 26 years-old, "has always made the right choices and has tackled almost all genres". In the process, she became the image of the perfume Candy for the Italian luxury group Prada.

In 2012, she starred in Farewell, My Queen. The film opened the 62nd Berlin International Film Festival, where it was met with critical acclaim. Critics praised director Benoît Jacquot's decision to cast Seydoux in the key-role of Sidonie, stating "her luminous but watchful eyes suggest a soul wise beyond her years." Kenneth Turan of the Los Angeles Times wrote that Seydoux was an excellent choice for the part, calling her a remarkably versatile young actress and pointed to the stark difference in her characters from her previous roles in Midnight in Paris and Mission: Impossible – Ghost Protocol. That same year, she appeared in the Swiss drama film, Sister. The film competed in competition at the 62nd Berlin International Film Festival, where it won the Special Award, the Silver Bear, and was selected as the Swiss entry for the Best Foreign Language Oscar at the 85th Academy Awards. Critics again praised Seydoux for bringing a strong array of emotions to a highly unsympathetic part and called her performance intensely moving. That year, Seydoux was attached to star in Michael Gondry's Mood Indigo, but had to drop out before filming due to scheduling conflicts with Blue Is the Warmest Colour, being replaced by Charlotte Le Bon. By the end of 2012, she had filmed Blue Is the Warmest Colour by Abdellatif Kechiche, and Grand Central by Rebecca Zlotowski, and both exhibited at the 66th Cannes Film Festival.

"It's true that I'm in high demand and I've learned to say no to higher-paying films so that I can work on projects that are close to my heart, like Sister. And then I had to give up Michel Gondry's Mood Indigo to finish Kechiche's film. In general, I try not to put too much pressure on myself. I know that I'm very lucky. And also that there will be times in my career when I'll have fewer offers."

— Léa Seydoux on how she picks her film roles, in 2012,

=== 2013–2018: Blue is the Warmest Colour and critical acclaim ===
In 2013, Seydoux was nominated for Best Actress at the 38th César Awards for her role as Sidonie Laborde in Benoît Jacquot's Farewell, My Queen. Later that year at the 66th Cannes Film Festival, Blue Is the Warmest Color won the Palme d'Or and the jury, headed by Steven Spielberg, took the unusual move of awarding the prize not just to the director Abdellatif Kechiche, but also to the film's two stars, Seydoux and Adèle Exarchopoulos. Seydoux stated: "Winning that honor was such a thing. It's engraved in me," also remarking that "attending the Cannes Film Festival will always remind me of that big moment of my life".

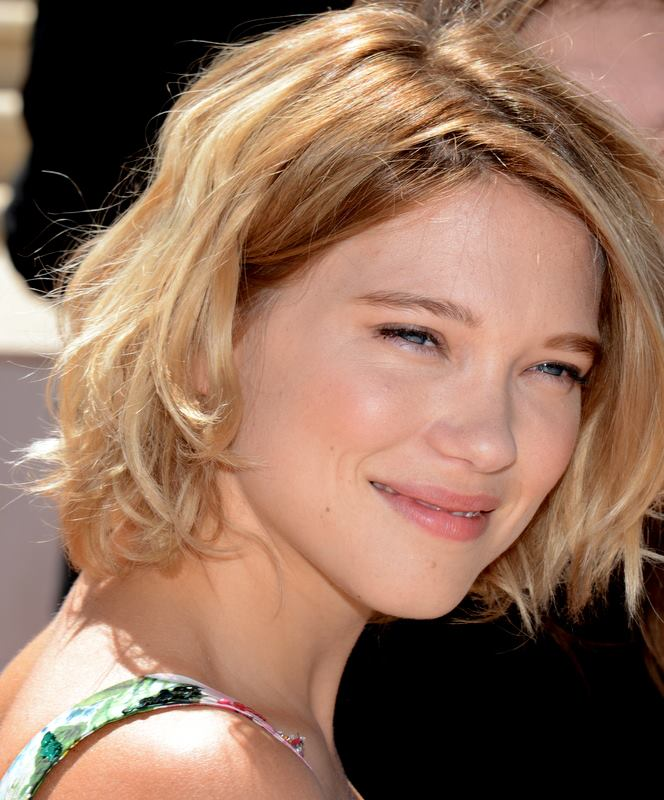
Seydoux at the 66th Cannes Film Festival, 2013

In 2014, Seydoux won the Best Actress award at the 19th Lumière Awards for her roles in Blue Is the Warmest Colour and Grand Central. She was also nominated for the BAFTA Rising Star Award and the César Award for Best Actress in the same year. Her role in Blue Is the Warmest Colour earned her rave reviews, numerous accolades and international attention.

Seydoux co-starred with Vincent Cassel in Beauty and the Beast, a Franco-German romantic fantasy film directed by Christophe Gans. Her other 2014 films were The Grand Budapest Hotel, a Wes Anderson film in which she played Clotilde; and Bertrand Bonello's Saint Laurent, in which she played the role of the titular designer's muse, Loulou de la Falaise. Seydoux was supposed to star in Benoît Jacquot's Three Hearts, alongside Catherine Deneuve and Charlotte Gainsbourg, but ended up dropping out due to the worldwide press tour of Blue Is the Warmest Colour. She was replaced by Deneuve's daughter, Chiara Mastroianni.

In 2015, Seydoux starred with Vincent Lindon in Diary of a Chambermaid, a period piece based on Octave Mirbeau's novel Le Journal d'une femme de chambre. Originally, the film was announced with Marion Cotillard in the leading role, but the script was rewritten specifically for Seydoux, marking her second collaboration with Benoît Jacquot, after the 2012 film Farewell, My Queen. Although the film was screened in competition at the 65th Berlin International Film Festival to mixed reviews, critics were generally receptive to Seydoux's performance. Peter Bradshaw of The Guardian said that it was "a fine central performance from Seydoux", while critic Jordan Mintzer wrote that her performance is "robust and engaging throughout [the film]".

Seydoux appeared alongside Colin Farrell and Rachel Weisz in Yorgos Lanthimos's English-language debut The Lobster (2015), in which she played the ruthless leader of a group of rebels, the loners, who live in the woods. The film had its premiere at the 2015 Cannes Film Festival, where it won the Jury Prize. She also appears as Madeleine Swann, the Bond girl in the 2015 film Spectre, the 24th James Bond film. Seydoux was cast in Valérie Donzelli's Marguerite & Julien, but dropped out before shooting, being replaced by Anaïs Demoustier. In 2022, Seydoux remembered the occasion, saying that she was against the fact that Donzelli seemed to approve the incestuous relationship between the two main roles, "she wanted to do a film where even you can fall in love with your biological brother. I was like, 'No'".

In 2016, Minister of Culture Fleur Pellerin made her a Dame of the Order of Arts and Letters (Ordre des Arts et des Lettres). Seydoux later appeared in Xavier Dolan's It's Only the End of the World, based on Jean-Luc Lagarce's play Juste la fin du monde.

In 2018, Seydoux co-starred alongside Ewan McGregor in Zoe, a sci-fi romance by Drake Doremus. The film had its world premiere at the Tribeca Film Festival on April. She also appeared in Thomas Vinterberg's Kursk, a drama film about the 2000 Kursk submarine disaster. In May 2018, she served as a member of the jury at the 71st Cannes Film Festival. Also in May 2018, it was announced that Seydoux would star in Ari Folman's Horse Boy with Joel Kinnaman. Folman said that it was "a passion project" and that "he felt compelled to explore this important story in a cinematic way", but the movie was never shot.

Seydoux was invited to join the Academy of Motion Picture Arts and Sciences within the same year.

=== 2019–present: Work with auteurs and continued acclaim ===
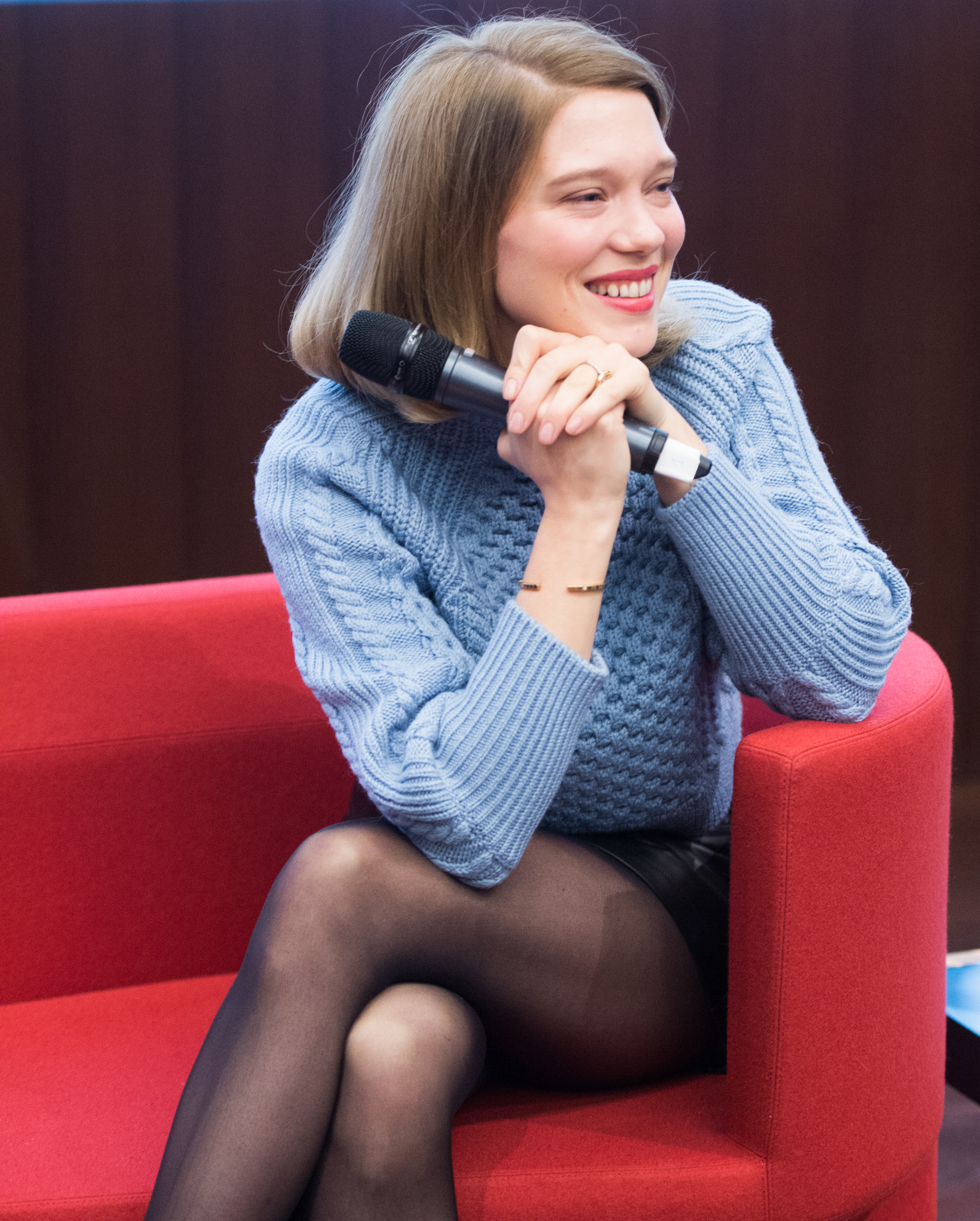
Seydoux in 2018

Seydoux stars in Hideo Kojima's video game Death Stranding. She provided the voice, performance and her likeness to the character Fragile, the head of Fragile Express. Death Stranding released in November 2019 to positive reviews in which critics called her a "marvel", and described her performance as being among some of the "most nuanced performance capture ever seen in the medium". She also stars in the game's sequel, Death Stranding 2: On the Beach (2025). Death Stranding 2: On the Beach released in June 2025 to critical acclaim, with Seydoux being lauded again for her performance as Fragile, which critics called "a layered character that the French actress elevates even further". She also appeared in Oh Mercy!, a French crime drama by director Arnaud Desplechin. The film premiered at Cannes and was selected to compete for the Palme d'Or.

In 2020, Seydoux collaborated with Arnaud Desplechin for the second time on Deception (2021). In June 2020, Seydoux was cast as the lead role in Arnaud des Pallières' Party of Fools (2023), alongside Charlotte Rampling and Cécile de France, but all three actresses dropped out of the movie before filming, with Seydoux being replaced by Mélanie Thierry.

In September 2020, it was announced that Seydoux would be starring in Mia Hansen-Løve's film One Fine Morning. For her performance in One Fine Morning, Seydoux received critical acclaim, Justin Chang from Los Angeles Times praised her: "Walking down the street in a sweater and a short-cropped Jean Seberg haircut, Seydoux dissolves into Sandra's world beautifully. What holds you, as much as the actor's natural magnetism, is her ability to hold things back, her talent for emotional reserve". Hansen-Løve declared herself to be a huge admirer of Seydoux as an actor, as well as her choices throughout her vast filmography, saying: "A lot of [her] characters are very sophisticated, very glamorous. In the past, it felt she was seen by male directors as a bit of a fantasy. I wanted her to be more down-to-earth, closer to us, closer to me. And I had the feeling there was a rawness about her that my film could maybe emphasize". In addition, Seydoux stated that "it's the first time that I really played a normal woman, the girl next door".

In 2021, Seydoux reprised her role as Madeleine Swann in the James Bond film No Time to Die. The film's release was postponed worldwide due to the COVID-19 pandemic. She starred in Wes Anderson's ensemble comedy-drama The French Dispatch (2021). She played Lizzy in Ildikó Enyedi's The Story of My Wife (2021), and starred in the film France (2021) by Bruno Dumont.

In January 2021, it was announced that Seydoux would star in Bertrand Bonello's sci-fi melodrama The Beast (La Bête). Seydoux's performance in The Beast was called a "career-best" from critics, Yasmin Omar from Curzon wrote: "What keeps all of the film's sky-high concepts not only legible, but engrossing, is Seydoux; she is its grounding force, guiding us through the Dantean maze of mahogany-panelled ballrooms and neon-streaked dancefloors". In April 2021, Deadline reported that Seydoux would star alongside Kristen Stewart and Viggo Mortensen in David Cronenberg's sci-fi thriller Crimes of the Future. Seydoux said in the film, she plays a surgeon in a dystopian future "where people eat plastic". The film premiered in competition at the Cannes Film Festival in May 2022.

In January 2022, Seydoux was nominated as Best Actress at the 47th César Awards for her role in Bruno Dumont's France (2021). It was her fifth nomination. In June 2022, it was announced that Seydoux was cast as Lady Margot in Denis Villeneuve's Dune: Part Two, which released in March 2024.

In 2023, Seydoux dropped out of two projects she was cast in 2022: David Cronenberg's The Shrouds, being replaced by Diane Kruger and Audrey Diwan's Emmanuelle, being replaced by Noémie Merlant. A year later, Seydoux said that the reason she dropped out of The Shrouds was because she wanted to have some time for herself, adding: "I loved working with David Cronenberg. I love him. I'm a huge fan, but then I thought, first of all, I was a bit tired. I wanted to have a break".

In January 2024, Seydoux revealed in an interview with Télérama that she had recently completed two weeks of filming for an unannounced new film by Quentin Dupieux, then titled À notre beau métier (To Our Beautiful Profession), which would also star Louis Garrel, Raphaël Quenard and Vincent Lindon. Seydoux read the script in one sitting and quickly accepted the role out of admiration for Dupieux, who she described as an "extraordinary filmmaker" whose style of humour "hides an increasingly social depth, through imperfect and clumsy characters". She described the film as a mise en abyme about "actors who play in a lousy film" and confront their characters and lines, and appraised it as "crazy" and "very, very funny". Production for the film was kept fully secret from beginning to end. The Second Act was selected to be the opening film at the 77th Cannes Film Festival, where it had its world premiere out-of-competition on 14 May 2024. It was released theatrically in France on the same day by Diaphana Distribution and became a box-office hit with nearly 500,000 spectators, making it Dupieux's biggest success to date.

In March 2024, it was announced that Seydoux would reunite for the second time with Ildiko Enyedi in Silent Friend. In the film, she will play a scientist named Alice, opposite Tony Leung. Filming took place in Marburg, from April to May. Also in March 2024, it was announced that Seydoux would reunite with Arnaud Desplechin for the third time, as she signed on to star in The Thing That Hurts, alongside Golshifteh Farahani, John Turturro and Jason Schwartzman.

In April 2024, it was announced that Seydoux will star opposite Josh O'Connor in Luca Guadagnino's Separate Rooms, an adaptation of the 1989 novel Camera separate by Pier Vittorio Tondelli. In May 2025, O'Connor revealed he is no longer attached to the project but that Guadagnino "may well do it". In May 2024, Seydoux signed on to star in The Unknown, the next film by Arthur Harari, after being attached to the project since September 2023. Filming began on March and wrapped in May 2025. Also in May 2024, the French magazine Le Monde revealed that Seydoux will star alongside Adam Driver in Leos Carax's next project, with shooting scheduled for 2026.

In October 2024, it was announced that Seydoux would be part of the ensemble cast for the film Alpha Gang by the Zellner brothers, joining Cate Blanchett, Steven Yeun, Zoe Kravitz, Riley Keough, Channing Tatum and Dave Bautista. Production began in June 2025 in Budapest.

In September 2025, Seydoux signed on to star in Marie Kreutzer's Gentle Monster, alongside Catherine Deneuve, Jella Haase and Laurence Rupp, with production scheduled to begin later that month.

In January 2026, Seydoux joined Mikey Madison in Charlie Polinger's The Masque Of The Red Death, a revisionist and darkly comedic take on the short story of the same name by Edgar Allan Poe.

In September 2026, it was announced that Seydoux is set to reunite with Ursula Meier, who directed her in Sister, in The Quiet Land alongside Bill Murray. Production is expected to begin in Alberta, Canada in early 2027.

== Other endeavours ==
=== Advertising campaigns and endorsements ===
Seydoux has modelled for numerous magazines and brands, but sees herself "always as an actress", not as a model. In 2007, she participated in the Levi's television advert "Dangerous Liaison" alongside Raphael Personaz, and has been seen in several photo editorials, including for Vogue Paris, American Vogue, Numéro, L'Officiel, CRASH, Another Magazine and W magazine. She fronted the 2013 campaign for South Korean-based but French-inspired jewellery line Didier Dubot and appeared in Rag & Bone's Fall 2013 campaign with Michael Pitt.

She also appeared in a nude pictorial for French men's magazine Lui. In addition, Seydoux and her Blue Is the Warmest Colour co-star Adèle Exarchopoulos were featured in Miu Miu's 2014 resort ad campaign. Seydoux advertised for Prada's 2012 Resort line; and is the face of its 2013 campaign for the fragrances Prada Candy (shot by Jean-Paul Goude), Prada Candy L'Eau (directed by Wes Anderson and Roman Coppola), and the 2014 campaign for Prada Candy Florale perfume (shot by Steven Meisel).

For most of the 2010s, the actress was dressed for her red carpet appearances by her own sister, fashion designer Camille Seydoux, whose career took off when she dressed Seydoux for the César Awards ceremony in 2011. The duo then appeared several times in the rankings of the best dressed actresses in France and abroad.

Since 2016, Seydoux has been a brand ambassador for Louis Vuitton.

== Public image ==
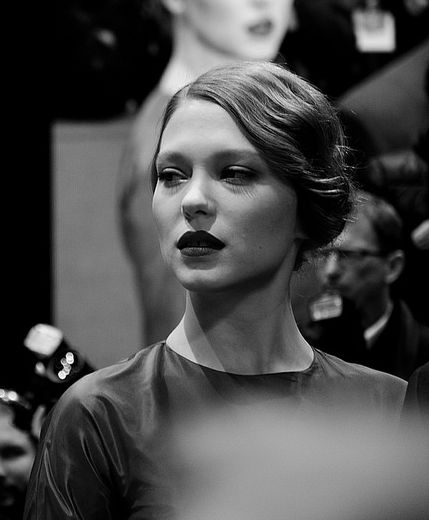
Many film critics compare Seydoux (here in 2014 during the presentation of Beauty and the Beast at the Berlinale) to stars of yesteryear such as Jeanne Moreau, Anna Karina or Brigitte Bardot

Regularly present on the big screen in the 2010s and 2020s with nearly four films shot per year, Léa Seydoux has earned a reputation for excelling in ambiguous and minimalist acting, in restraint, inviting the viewer to invest themselves in trying to unravel the mystery of her characters. Directors, screenwriters and on-screen partners see in her an actress who does a lot with little, and who makes her scenes richer than they appear through her presence and vulnerability. At the beginning of her career, the actress oscillated between two types of characters in particular, "inconsolable melancholic" or "poisonous solar". The precision of her diction, despite the "machine-gun flow" she can adopt is noted, as is her indifference to having to sometimes undress in front of the camera, which she attributes to the fact of having been raised by a mother "with a loving gaze". Her characters are regularly objects of desire, filmed from the point of view of a male fantasy; since the filming of Blue Is the Warmest Colour, however, she has been more attentive to the shots of these nude scenes and checks the shots on the monitor.

According to her directors, the actress has a timeless physique that would allow her to project all kinds of narrative issues and social origins onto her characters, and would particularly facilitate her casting in period films, whether she is a maid to Marie Antoinette or a chambermaid. The variety in her choice of films and roles leads The New York Times to recognize that it is difficult to place her in a single register, even if she is always identified with her "presence at once seductive and discreet".

Seydoux is seen as a "director's actress", whose performance closely follows the direction adopted by the film's director to adapt to the chosen style. This approach explains the fact that a large part of her filmography is made up of collaborations with the same people: Wes Anderson (four), Bertrand Bonello (three), Rebecca Zlotowski (two), Ildikó Enyedi (two), Benoît Jacquot (two), Arnaud Desplechin (two). Several directors design or write their films with Seydoux in mind, such as Anderson, Desplechin or Mia Hansen-Løve. She compares her philosophy to a statement by Isabelle Huppert, in which the actress said that she made her own film within each film she made, and considers the actor as co-author of the film in the same way as the director. The actress does not rely entirely on her instinct, as she continually searches for the character of her character, demanding additional takes to move from one mood to another, and is completely invested in satisfying the director's vision. Ursula Meier, who won the Silver Bear in Berlin as a director in Sister, said that "she has a grace, something unique. You can project whatever you want onto her, as a spectator or as a director. That's why she is so desired".

== Acting style ==
Seydoux has been praised for her versatility and her bold choices as an actor. Yasmin Omar from Curzon wrote in 2024: "You never know what you're going to get when you sit down to watch a Léa Seydoux film. She could be a tattoo-sleeved pothead, a sexually reawakened widow or a gun-toting assassin. She could be a misbehaving nun, a mentally unstable news anchor or a disfigured performance artist".

"When I act, I enter a trance state. I don't know if it's a state of absolute self-forgetfulness or total self-awareness. It's very violent, sometimes it overwhelms me. I'm excessive in the way I feel the world."

— Seydoux, 2016

Stephen Holden of The New York Times has compared Seydoux to the actresses Jeanne Moreau and Paulette Goddard. For the Swiss daily Le Temps, the actress, "at ease in blockbusters and art films, with her undeniably feline beauty, a little lunar, even stubborn, and the veil of melancholy tempering the disapproval of her gaze, is as beautiful as a prey as a predator, as common as an aristocrat". The Village Voice sees her as "always captivating", hiding layer after layer of vulnerability. Physically, Libération detects in her "pale similarities to Anna Karina"; for Télérama, her complexion and her blondness evoke the young women in the paintings of Renoir or Botticelli. Her easily recognizable smile, with a space between the two central incisors, also reminded several newspapers of the appearance and presence of Brigitte Bardot.

Thierry Frémaux, general delegate of the Cannes Film Festival, where Seydoux was one of the most frequent guests in the 2010s, states that she "owes nothing to a recognized lineage, she came out of nowhere and remains unpredictable, inventing herself, according to her wishes, the multiple requests of which she is the subject: from pure French auteur cinema to American blockbusters. Léa is Brigitte Bardot, plus Juliette Binoche, plus Kate Moss, and sometimes all three at the same time".

Seydoux says she is a big admirer of Catherine Deneuve, whose acting she considers "full of instinctive intelligence and self-mockery", and Isabelle Huppert, for the same intelligence, culture and sensitivity. In return, Deneuve sent her congratulations in 2022 for her role in The Story of My Wife.

In interviews, Seydoux says she watches few films, and generally films that are not from contemporary cinema, such as her favourite film, A Place in the Sun by George Stevens. She mentions Stanley Kubrick, Ingmar Bergman, Robert Bresson, Éric Rohmer and Pedro Almodóvar as her favourite directors.

== In the media ==
The most sought-after French actress of her generation, Léa Seydoux is often compared to Marion Cotillard, ten years her senior, with whom she shares a similar international career and critical success. Télérama also unites them by acclaiming them in 2021 as the "two best [French] exports". In the French cinema landscape, the actress emerges as a discreet star, absent from the tabloid press and social media, and uncomfortable in interviews. When campaigning for her films, the actress can be disarming with her spontaneity and her tendency to go beyond promotional conventions, for example by talking about a film other than the one she is supposed to discuss with a journalist or expressing surprise at the marketing resources made available to promote a film.

During the 2010s, Seydoux's career became almost inseparable from the prestigious Cannes Film Festival: the business magazines Le Figaro, The Hollywood Reporter and Deadline noted that she had become one of its biggest regulars, presenting at least one film in competition almost every year, which often won one of the prizes at stake, when she herself was not a member of the jury; appearing in four films selected for the festival in 2021 would also constitute a record of 18. In 2021, Deadline noted that since Seydoux's first invitation to the festival, she had achieved the status of "one of France's most beloved exports". The international news agency Associated Press echoes many media in summarizing in 2022 that Léa Seydoux, who has become one of the most famous faces of European cinema and a notable actress in each of her forays into Hollywood, "reigns at Cannes".

In 2019, Reader's Digest named her in their list of "Amazing French actresses in film history". In 2020, Seydoux was included on Vogue's list of "The most beautiful French actresses of all time".

== Personal life ==
Seydoux began a long-term relationship with André Meyer beginning in 2013, and gave birth to their son in January 2017. As of 2026, she is in a relationship with the Italian film producer Tommaso Bertani, with whom she has a second son, born in December 2024. (Note: Attributed to multiple references: Seydoux lives in Paris as of 2024.)

Amid the Harvey Weinstein sexual abuse cases and the MeToo movement in 2017, Seydoux accused Weinstein of trying to sexually assault her.

In 2021, Seydoux missed the 74th Cannes Film Festival, which was screening four of her films, due to testing positive for COVID-19.

In 2022, she was made a Dame of the National Order of Merit by the French government.

== Advocacy ==
In September 2023, Seydoux declined to attend the premiere of her film The Beast at the 80th Venice International Film Festival, in support of the 2023 SAG-AFTRA strike.

In 2024, she signed a petition addressed to French President Emmanuel Macron demanding that France officially recognize the State of Palestine. The following year, Seydoux signed an open letter criticizing the film industry's "passivity" during the ongoing Gaza genocide.

== Filmography ==
Key
†	Denotes projects that have not yet been released

=== Film ===
Year	Title	Role	Director	Notes	Ref.
2006	Girlfriends	Aurore	Sylvie Ayme		
2007	La Consolation	Camille	Matthew Frost	Short film	
2007	The Last Mistress	Olivia	Catherine Breillat		
2007	13 French Street	Jenny	Jean-Pierre Mocky		
2007	Jalouse	Lauréne	Matthew Frost	Short film	
2008	On War	Marie	Bertrand Bonello		
2008	Des poupées et des anges	Gisèle	Nora Hamdi		
2008	The Beautiful Person	Junie	Christophe Honoré		
2009	Lourdes	Maria	Jessica Hausner		
2009	Des illusions	The subway girl	Étienne Faure		
2009	Inglourious Basterds	Charlotte LaPadite	Quentin Tarantino		
2009	Going South	Léa	Sébastien Lifshitz		
2010	Robin Hood	Isabella of Angoulême	Ridley Scott		
2010	Petit tailleur	Marie–Julie	Louis Garrel	Short film	
2010	Sans laisser de traces	Fleur	Grégoire Vigneron		
2010	Belle Épine	Prudence Friedmann	Rebecca Zlotowski		
2010	Roses à crédit	Marjoline	Amos Gitai		
2010	Mysteries of Lisbon	Blanche de Montfort	Raúl Ruiz		
2011	Midnight in Paris	Gabrielle	Woody Allen		
2011	Mission: Impossible – Ghost Protocol	Sabine Moreau	Brad Bird		
2011	Time Doesn't Stand Still	Elle	Asa Mader; Benjamin Millepied	Short film	
2011	My Wife's Romance	Eve	Djamshed Usmonov		
2012	Farewell, My Queen	Agathe-Sidonie Laborde	Benoît Jacquot		
2012	Sister	Louise	Ursula Meier		
2013	Blue Is the Warmest Colour	Emma	Abdellatif Kechiche		
2013	Grand Central	Karole	Rebecca Zlotowski		
2014	Beauty and the Beast	Belle	Christophe Gans		
2014	The Grand Budapest Hotel	Clothilde	Wes Anderson		
2014	Saint Laurent	Loulou de la Falaise	Bertrand Bonello		
2015	Diary of a Chambermaid	Célestine	Benoît Jacquot		
2015	The Lobster	Loner Leader	Yorgos Lanthimos		
2015	Spectre	Madeleine Swann	Sam Mendes		
2016	It's Only the End of the World	Suzanne	Xavier Dolan		
2018	Zoe	Zoe	Drake Doremus		
2018	Kursk	Tanya	Thomas Vinterberg		
2019	Oh Mercy!	Claude	Arnaud Desplechin		
2021	The French Dispatch	Simone	Wes Anderson		
2021	Deception	The English Lover	Arnaud Desplechin		
2021	The Story of My Wife	Lizzy	Ildikó Enyedi		
2021	France	France de Meurs	Bruno Dumont		
2021	No Time to Die	Madeleine Swann	Cary Joji Fukunaga		
2022	Crimes of the Future	Caprice	David Cronenberg		
2022	One Fine Morning	Sandra Kienzler	Mia Hansen-Løve		
2023	The Beast	Gabrielle Monnier	Bertrand Bonello		
2024	Dune: Part Two	Margot Fenring	Denis Villeneuve		
2024	The Second Act	Florence Drucker	Quentin Dupieux		
2025	Silent Friend	Alice	Ildiko Enyedi		
2026	Gentle Monster	Lucy Weiss	Marie Kreutzer		
2026	The Unknown	Eva / David Zimmerman	Arthur Harari		
2026	Alpha Gang	TBA	David Zellner; Nathan Zellner		
TBA	The Masque of the Red Death †	TBA	Charlie Polinger	Post-production	
TBA	The Quiet Land	TBA	Ursula Meier	Pre-production	

=== Television ===
Year	Title	Role	Notes
2004	Père et Maire	La Lycéenne	Episode: "Responsabilité parentale"
2008	Les Vacances de Clémence	Jackie	Telefilm
2011	Mysteries of Lisbon	Blanche de Monfort	Episode: "Blanche de Monfort"

=== Video games ===
Year	Title	Role	Notes
2019	Death Stranding	Fragile	Voice, 3D model, and motion capture
2025	Death Stranding 2: On the Beach	Fragile	Voice, 3D model, and motion capture

== Accolades ==
In 2016, Seydoux was honoured with the Dame of the Order of Arts and Letters. In 2018, Seydoux was invited to join the Academy of Motion Picture Arts and Sciences.

Year	Award	Category	Nominated work	Result
2009	César Award	Most Promising Actress	The Beautiful Person	Nominated
2009	Étoiles d'or du cinéma français	Female Revelation	The Beautiful Person	Nominated
2009	Festival International du Film Francophone de Namur	Best Actress	The Beautiful Person	Won
2009	Lumière Awards	Most Promising Actress	The Beautiful Person	Nominated
2009	Trophée Chopard Award	Female Revelation of the Year	The Beautiful Person	Won
2010	César Award	Most Promising Actress	Belle Épine	Nominated
2011	San Diego Film Critics Society Award	Best Performance by an Ensemble	Midnight in Paris	Nominated
2011	Prix Romy Schneider Award	Prix Romy Schneider	My Wife's Romance	Nominated
2013	Lumière Awards	Best Actress	Grand Central	Won
2013	César Award	Best Actress	Farewell, My Queen	Nominated
2013	Cabourg Film Festival Awards	Best Actress	Farewell, My Queen	Won
2013	Chicago Film Critics Association Award	Best Supporting Actress	Blue Is the Warmest Colour	Nominated
2013	Glamour Awards	Next Breakthrough	Blue Is the Warmest Colour	Nominated
2013	Hamptons International Film Festival Award	Breakthrough Performer	Blue Is the Warmest Colour	Won
2013	International Cinephile Society Awards	Best Supporting Actress	Blue Is the Warmest Colour	Won
2013	Lumière Awards	Best Actress	Blue Is the Warmest Colour	Won
2013	National Society of Film Critics Award	Best Supporting Actress	Blue Is the Warmest Colour	Nominated
2013	Online Film Critics Society Award	Best Supporting Actress	Blue Is the Warmest Colour	Nominated
2013	Cannes Film Festival Award	Palme d'Or	Blue Is the Warmest Colour	Won
2013	Prix Romy Schneider Award	Prix Romy Schneider	Blue Is the Warmest Colour	Nominated
2013	Portuguese Online Film Critics Circle Award	Best Supporting Actress	Blue Is the Warmest Colour	Won
2013	San Francisco Film Critics Circle Award	Best Supporting Actress	Blue Is the Warmest Colour	Nominated
2013	St. Louis Gateway Film Critics Association Award	Best Supporting Actress	Blue Is the Warmest Colour	Nominated
2013	Village Voice Film Poll Award	Best Supporting Actress	Blue Is the Warmest Colour	Nominated
2014	BAFTA Award	Rising Star Award	Blue Is the Warmest Colour	Nominated
2014	César Award	Best Actress	Blue Is the Warmest Colour	Nominated
2014	Satellite Award	Best Supporting Actress – Motion Picture	Blue Is the Warmest Colour	Nominated
2014	Critics' Choice Movie Award	Best Acting Ensemble	The Grand Budapest Hotel	Nominated
2014	Detroit Film Critics Society Awards	Best Acting Ensemble	The Grand Budapest Hotel	Won
2014	Florida Film Critics Circle Award	Best Cast	The Grand Budapest Hotel	Won
2014	San Diego Film Critics Society Award	Best Performance by an Ensemble	The Grand Budapest Hotel	Nominated
2014	Screen Actors Guild Award	Outstanding Performance by a Cast in a Motion Picture	The Grand Budapest Hotel	Nominated
2014	Washington D.C. Area Film Critics Association Award	Best Ensemble	The Grand Budapest Hotel	Nominated
2016	Teen Choice Awards	Choice Movie Actress: Action	Spectre	Nominated
2017	Riviera International Film Festival	Best Actress	It's Only the End of the World	Nominated
2020	British Academy Games Awards	Performer in a Supporting Role	Death Stranding	Nominated
2022	César Award	Best Actress	France	Nominated
2022	European Film Awards	Best Actress	One Fine Morning	Nominated
2023	Valladolid International Film Festival	Best Actress	The Beast	Won
2024	Seattle Film Critics Society	Best Actress	The Beast	Nominated
2024	Chicago Film Critics Association	Best Actress	The Beast	Nominated
2024	Florida Film Critics Circle	Best Actress	The Beast	Won

== See also ==
- List of atheists in film, radio, television and theater
