= Jul Maroh =

French comic book author

- Born: 1985 (age 40–41) Lens, France
- Areas: Writer, Artist
- Notable works: Blue Is the Warmest Color

Jul Maroh (French: [maʁo]; born Julie Maroh) is a French writer and illustrator of graphic novels who wrote Blue Is the Warmest Color (Le bleu est une couleur chaude, 'Blue is a Warm Colour'), a story about the life and love of two young lesbians that was adapted by Abdellatif Kechiche into the film Blue Is the Warmest Colour.

== Biography ==
Maroh originates from Northern France. After obtaining an applied arts baccalauréat at the École supérieure des arts appliqués et du textile (E.S.A.A.T.) in Roubaix, they continued studies in Brussels, where they lived for eight years. There, they received two diplomas: one in Visual Arts (comics option) at the École supérieure des arts Saint-Luc and the other in Lithography/Engraving at the Académie Royale des Beaux-Arts of Brussels.

Maroh is openly transgender and nonbinary. They started writing Blue is the Warmest Color when they were 19 and it took them five years to complete it.

== Works ==
- Blue Is the Warmest Color (Le bleu est une couleur chaude), Arsenal Pulp Press, 2013 - ISBN 978-1551525143. The title was originally published by Glénat in 2010 and received a prize at 2011 Angoulême International Comics Festival. It has been adapted in film by Abdelatif Kechiche with the title Blue Is the Warmest Colour (Palme d'Or at the 2013 Cannes Film Festival.
- Skandalon (2013)
- Brahms (2015)
- Body Music (French: Corps sonores, 2017)
- You Brought Me The Ocean (2020)
- Hacker la peau, with Sabrina Calvo (2023)
