= Pleasure (disambiguation) =

Pleasure is an experience of happiness, entertainment, enjoyment, ecstasy, or euphoria.

Pleasure and Pleasures may also refer to:

== Film ==
- Pleasure (1931 film), an American romantic drama film
- Pleasure (2013 film), a Swedish short film
- Pleasure (2021 film), a Swedish film
- The Pleasure, a 1985 Italian erotic drama film
- Pleasures, a 1986 American television film
- Pleasure, a 1994 British television film starring Adrian Dunbar and Jennifer Ehle

== Music ==
=== Performers ===
- Pleasure (Oregon band), a late-1970s soul, funk and jazz group
- Pleasure (Norwegian band), a 2000s pop band
- Pleasure (go-go band), a 1980s American all-woman band
- Pleasure P (born 1984), American R&B singer-songwriter

=== Albums ===
- Pleasure (Club 8 album), 2015
- Pleasure (Feist album), or the title song, 2017
- Pleasure (Girls at Our Best! album), or the title song, 1981
- Pleasure (Jolin Tsai album), or the title song (see below), 2025
- Pleasure (Marion Meadows album), 1998
- Pleasure (Ohio Players album), or the title song, 1972
- Pleasure (Pearl album), 2015
- Pleasure, by Sondre Lerche, 2017
- Pleasure (EP), by Semisonic, 1995
- Pleasures (album), by CNBLUE, 2023

=== Songs ===
- "Pleasure" (song), by Jolin Tsai, 2025
- "Pleasure", by Al Jarreau from L Is for Lover, 1986
- "Pleasure", by Argent from Ring of Hands, 1971
- "Pleasure", by Arto Lindsay from Mundo Civilizado, 1997
- "Pleasure", by Billy Ocean from Tear Down These Walls, 1988
- "Pleasure", by Iggy Pop from Party, 1981
- "Pleasure", by Justice from Woman, 2016
- "Pleasure", by Montaigne from Complex, 2019
- "Pleasure", by the Soup Dragons from Hotwired, 1992
- "Pleasure", by Spandau Ballet from True, 1983
- "Pleasure", by Sun Ra from Other Planes of There, 1966

== See also ==
- Western pleasure, a kind of horse-riding competition
- Pleasure Island (disambiguation)
- Pleasure Point (disambiguation)
- Pleasant (disambiguation)
