= List of Mubi films =

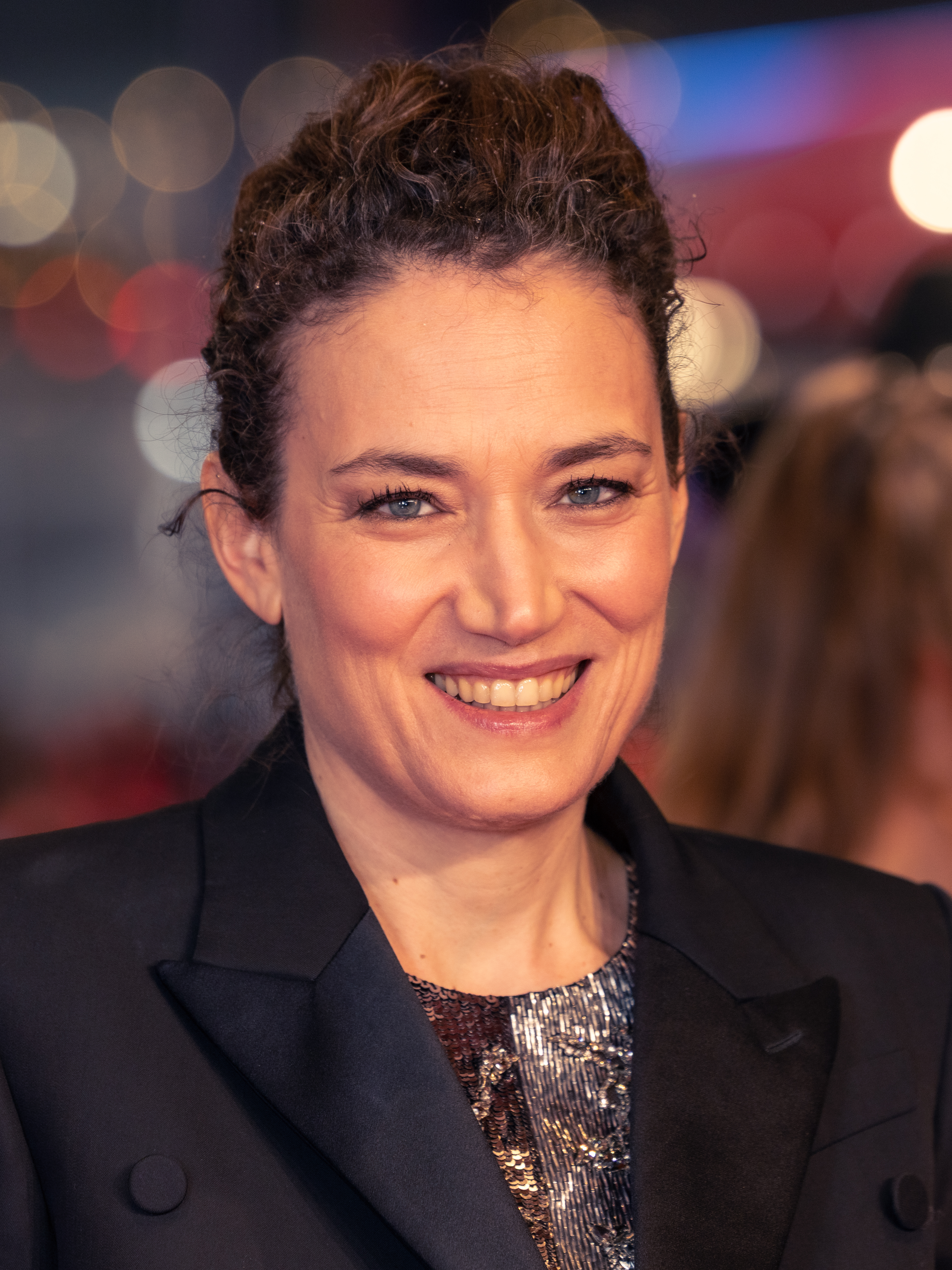
Coralie Fargeat directed The Substance (2024), Mubi's highest-grossing film at the global box office.

This is a list of films originally produced and/or distributed theatrically by the British streaming platform, production and distribution company Mubi. The company was founded in 2007 by Turkish CEO Efe Cakarel. Its first film released in the U.K. was Arabian Nights, on April 22, 2016, while Baden Baden was its first film released in the U.S. on November 25, 2016. The company also started to distribute films in Latin America and Germany in 2021, and in Italy and Spain in 2025.

Ever since, Mubi has been acquiring distribution rights of numerous art house films, generally productions with festival runs in Sundance, Berlin, Cannes, Venice or Toronto. The Substance (2024) is the platform's highest-grossing film, having grossed more than $82 million worldwide at the box office, and was the platform's first film to be nominated for the Academy Award for Best Picture.

Since 2022, the platform has also been acquiring exclusive rights to television series mostly created or directed by renowned auteurs. The first such acquisition was the long-delayed third season of Lars von Trier's The Kingdom, subtitled Exodus, alongside a remaster of the previous two seasons.

== Released films ==
=== 2016 ===
Release date	Film	Director(s)	Countries
April 22, 2016	Arabian Nights	Miguel Gomes	UK
September 9, 2016	The Blue Room	Mathieu Amalric	UK
September 23, 2016 (UK); November 25, 2016 (US)	Baden Baden	Rachel Lang	US and UK
November 18, 2016	I, Olga	Tomás Weinreb & Petr Kazda	UK
December 16, 2016	The Son of Joseph	Eugène Green	UK

=== 2017 ===
Release date	Film	Director(s)	Countries
April 21, 2017 (UK); May 19, 2017 (US)	The Happiest Day in the Life of Olli Mäki	Juho Kuosmanen	US and UK
May 25, 2017	Weirdos	Bruce McDonald	US
June 16, 2017	Slack Bay	Bruno Dumont	UK
August 25, 2017	Mimosas	Oliver Laxe	UK
September 22, 2017	On Body and Soul	Ildikó Enyedi	UK
November 10, 2017	Félicité	Alain Gomis	UK
November 17, 2017	Wet Woman in the Wind	Akihiko Shiota	US
November 24, 2017	Antiporno	Sion Sono	US

=== 2018 ===
Release date	Film	Director(s)	Countries
January 12, 2018 (US); January 19, 2018 (UK)	Lover for a Day	Philippe Garrel	US and UK
March 23, 2018	Have a Nice Day	Liu Jian	UK
July 6, 2018	Ryuichi Sakamoto: Coda	Stephen Nomura Schible	US and UK
August 3, 2018	The Apparition	Xavier Giannoli	UK
October 19, 2018	Touch Me Not	Adina Pintilie	UK
October 26, 2018	Don't Worry, He Won't Get Far on Foot	Gus Van Sant	UK
November 16, 2018	Suspiria	Luca Guadagnino	UK

=== 2019 ===
Release date	Film	Director(s)	Countries
March 8, 2019	Border	Ali Abbasi	UK
March 15, 2019	Under the Silver Lake	David Robert Mitchell	UK
May 10, 2019	Madeline's Madeline	Josephine Decker	UK and Ireland
July 5, 2019	Knife + Heart	Yann Gonzalez	UK and Ireland
August 16, 2019	LETO	Kirill Serebrennikov	UK and Ireland
October 11, 2019	Beanpole	Kantemir Balagov	UK and Ireland
October 18, 2019	Zombi Child	Bertrand Bonello	UK and Ireland
October 30, 2019	Yves Saint Laurent: The Last Collections	Olivier Meyrou	UK and Ireland
November 8, 2019	A Dog Called Money	Seamus Murphy	

=== 2020 ===
Release date	Film	Director(s)	Countries
February 14, 2020	The Staggering Girl	Luca Guadagnino	Worldwide (excl. China, Italy, Japan, Russia, Turkey theatrical)
March 13, 2020	Bacurau	Kleber Mendonça Filho and Juliano Dornelles	Austria, Germany, India, UK and Ireland
May 2, 2020 (CA, IN, KR, UK and IE); May 8, 2020 (FI, NO, SE)	Ema	Pablo Larraín	Canada, India, Latin America (excl. Chile, Mexico, Brazil), Scandinavia, South Korea, UK and Ireland
July 4, 2020	Family Romance, LLC	Werner Herzog	Australia, Japan, New Zealand, North America, Germany, Latin America (excl. Brazil), Turkey
August 28, 2020	Matthias & Maxime	Xavier Dolan	Australia, India, Latin America (excl. Mexico), New Zealand, US, UK and Ireland
October 16, 2020	The Other Lamb	Małgorzata Szumowska	UK and Ireland
October 31, 2020	Swallow	Carlo Mirabella-Davis	Australia, Bulgaria, Czech Republic, Greece, India, Indonesia, Latin America (excl. Mexico), New Zealand, Romania, Scandinavia, Slovakia, South Africa, Turkey
November 27, 2020	Nimic	Yorgos Lanthimos	Worldwide (excl. China)
December 3, 2020	Tripping with Nils Frahm	Benoit Toulemonde	Worldwide
December 11, 2020	Cold Meridian	Peter Strickland	Worldwide
December 18, 2020	Farewell Amor	Ekwa Msangi	Worldwide (excl. Africa, China, Israel, North America)

=== 2021 ===
Theatrical release	Release on Mubi	Film	Director(s)	Countries
January 29, 2021		Beginning	Dea Kulumbegashvili	Austria, Germany, India, Latin America, North America, Turkey, UK and Ireland
February 12, 2021		Dead Pigs	Cathy Yan	Worldwide (excl. China)
March 5, 2021		Notturno	Gianfranco Rosi	India, Latin America, Turkey, UK and Ireland
March 13, 2021		Hey There!	Reha Erdem	Canada, Germany, Turkey
March 19, 2021 (IN and US); March 28, 2021 (LATAM and TR)		Max Richter's Sleep	Natalie Johns	India, Latin America, Turkey, US
April 9, 2021		Songs My Brothers Taught Me	Chloe Zhao	Germany, Italy, Latin America, India, Netherlands, Turkey, UK, Ireland and others
April 17, 2021		Ghosts	Azra Deniz Okyay	Italy, Scandinavia, Turkey, UK and Ireland
May 7, 2021 (US)	May 21, 2021	State Funeral	Sergei Loznitsa	Australia, India, Latin America, New Zealand, North America, Turkey, UK and Ireland
May 28, 2021 (UK and IE)		First Cow	Kelly Reichardt	Worldwide (excl. China and US)
June 11, 2021		Shiva Baby	Emma Seligman	Austria, Benelux, France, Germany, India, Latin America, Switzerland, Turkey, UK and Ireland
June 18, 2021 (US)	July 23, 2021	Sweat	Magnus von Horn	India, Latin America, Turkey, US
July 30, 2021	September 23, 2021	Limbo	Ben Sharrock	UK and Ireland
August 13, 2021		New Order	Michel Franco	UK and Ireland
September 3, 2021	November 26, 2021	Annette	Leos Carax	India, Latin America, UK and Ireland
September 10, 2021 (US); October 29, 2021 (UK)		Azor	Andreas Fontana	India, Italy, Turkey, US, UK and Ireland
October 22, 2021		Cryptozoo	Dash Shaw	Austria, Germany, Turkey, UK and Ireland
November 12, 2021 (US)	January 7, 2022	What Do We See When We Look at the Sky?	Alexandre Koberidze	India, Italy, Latin America, North America, Turkey
November 19, 2021	February 18, 2022	Petite Maman	Céline Sciamma	India, Italy, Turkey, and UK and Ireland
December 10, 2021 (UK)	February 25, 2022	Lamb	Valdimar Jóhannsson	India, Latin America (excl. Mexico), Turkey, UK and Ireland

=== 2022 ===
Theatrical release	Release on Mubi	Film	Director(s)	Countries
January 14, 2022 (UK)	February 11, 2022	Cow	Andrea Arnold	Austria, Germany, India, Italy, Latin America, Turkey, UK and Ireland (excl. free TV rights)
January 28, 2022		Titane	Julia Ducournau	India, Latin America, Turkey
February 4, 2022 (US and UK)	March 8, 2022	Lingui, The Sacred Bonds	Mahamat Saleh Haroun	Latin America, North America, Turkey, UK and Ireland
April 15, 2022 (UK)	February 4, 2022 (TR) July 1, 2022	Benedetta	Paul Verhoeven	India, Turkey, UK and Ireland
March 4, 2022 (US); March 11, 2022 (UK)	May 6, 2022	Great Freedom	Sebastian Meise	India, Latin America (excl. Mexico), North America, Turkey, UK and Ireland
March 17, 2022 (AR, BR, CL, CO, MX)	April 1, 2022	Drive My Car	Ryusuke Hamaguchi	Africa (excl. French-language pay TV rights), India, Malaysia, Latin America (excl. Mexico), Middle East
March 25, 2022 (UK)	May 13, 2022	The Worst Person in The World	Joachim Trier	India, UK and Ireland
April 8, 2022 (UK and IE)	April 29, 2022	Prayers for the Stolen	Tatiana Huezo	France, India, Italy, UK and Ireland
May 5, 2022 (DE)	August 5, 2022	Memoria	Apichatpong Weerasethakul	Austria, Germany, India, Italy, Latin America (excl. Colombia, Bolivia, Peru, Ecuador)
May 27, 2022		Paris, 13th District	Jacques Audiard	India and Turkey
June 3, 2022 (UK and IE)	July 22, 2022	Bergman Island	Mia Hansen-Løve	UK and Ireland
June 15, 2022 (UK)	June 17, 2022	Pleasure	Ninja Thyberg	Italy, Latin America, Turkey, UK and Ireland
June 23, 2022 (DE) July 15, 2022 (UK)	August 26, 2022	A Chiara	Jonas Carpignano	Austria, Germany, Latin America, Turkey, UK and Ireland
June 24, 2022 (UK)	August 10, 2022	Faya Dayi	Jessica Beshir	Austria, France, Germany, India, Italy, Latin America, UK and Ireland
July 14, 2022 (LATAM)	July 29, 2022 (on Mubi)	Crimes of the Future	David Cronenberg	India, Latin America, Malaysia, Turkey
July 14, 2022 (DE)	September 16, 2022	One Second	Zhang Yimou	Austria, Germany, Turkey, UK and Ireland
August 12, 2022		The Humans	Stephen Karam	Austria, Benelux, France, Germany, India, Italy, Latin America, Turkey
August 12, 2022 (US); August 19, 2022 (UK)	October 7, 2022	Free Chol Soo Lee	Julie Ha and Eugene Yi	Austria, Germany, Italy, Latin America, North America, Turkey, UK and Ireland
September 2, 2022 (US)	September 9, 2022	The Cathedral	Ricky D'Ambrose	North America
September 2, 2022 (US)	October 4, 2022	Invisible Demons	Rahul Jain	Austria, Germany, India, Latin America, Malaysia, North America, Turkey, UK and Ireland
September 16, 2022 (US)	October 21, 2022	The African Desperate	Martine Syms	Worldwide
October 14, 2022 (US); October 21, 2022 (UK)	December 9, 2022	Decision to Leave	Park Chan-wook	North America, India, Turkey, UK and Ireland
November 18, 2022 (UK); December 15, 2022 (DE); February 1, 2023 (FR); January 6, 2023 (IN, IT, LATAM, UK and IE)	March 17, 2023 (AT, DE, ES)	Aftersun	Charlotte Wells	Austria, Benelux, France, Germany, India, Italy, Latin America, Malaysia, Spain, Turkey, UK and Ireland

=== 2023 ===
Theatrical release	Release on Mubi	Film	Director(s)	Countries
January 5, 2023 (LATAM); January 6, 2023 (UK and US)	February 24, 2023	Alcarràs	Carla Simón	India, Latin America, North America, Southeast Asia, Turkey, UK and Ireland
January 19, 2023 (LATAM); January 20, 2023 (UK and IE)	March 10, 2023	Holy Spider	Ali Abbasi	Latin America (excl. Mexico), Malaysia, UK and Ireland
February 20, 2023		Robe of Gems	Natalia López Gallardo	Africa, Austria, Baltics, Benelux, Germany, India, Italy, Latin America, Scandinavia, Southeast Asia, Spain, Switzerland
March 2, 2023 (LATAM); March 3, 2023 (UK)	April 21, 2023	Close	Lukas Dhont	India, Latin America, Turkey, UK and Ireland
March 23, 2023 (MX, CL and CO); March 24, 2023 (UK and US); March 30, 2023 (BR, AR and UY); April 13, 2023 (DE); May 12, 2023 (AT)	May 12, 2023 (CA, IN, LATAM, MY, TR, US, UK and IE); June 2, 2023 (AT, DE)	The Five Devils	Léa Mysius	Austria, Germany, India, Latin America, Malaysia, North America, Turkey, UK and Ireland
March 25, 2023		Leila's Brothers	Saeed Roustayi	Turkey
April 14, 2023 (UK and IE)	June 16, 2023	One Fine Morning	Mia Hansen-Løve	India, Turkey, UK and Ireland
May 4, 2023 (SG); May 5, 2023 (UK and IE); May 11, 2023 (IT and TH)	July 7, 2023	Return to Seoul	Davy Chou	India, Italy, Southeast Asia (ex. the Philippines, Cambodia theatrical), Turkey, UK and Ireland
May 17, 2023		Butterfly Vision	Maksym Nakonechnyi	India, Latin America, North America, UK and Ireland
May 26, 2023		Unclenching the Fists	Kira Kovalenko	India, Latin America, North America, UK and Ireland
June 9, 2023 (UK)	August 4, 2023	Medusa Deluxe	Thomas Hardiman	Austria, Germany, India, Italy, Latin America, Switzerland, Southeast Asia, Turkey, UK and Ireland
August 4, 2023 (US); August 10, 2023 (CL and MX); August 11, 2023 (CA); August 16, 2023 (BE and LU); August 17, 2023 (IT); August 17, 2023 (BR); August 24, 2023 (NL); August 31, 2023 (AT and DE); September 1, 2023 (UK and IE)	October 6, 2023 (CA, IN, LATAM, TR, US); October 27, 2023 (UK and NL); November 17, 2023 (DE and IT)	Passages	Ira Sachs	Austria, Benelux, Germany, India, Italy, Latin America, North America, Turkey, UK and Ireland
September 8, 2023 (US)	September 15, 2023	Rotting in the Sun	Sebastián Silva	Austria, Benelux, France, Germany, Italy, Latin America, North America, Spain, UK and Ireland
September 21, 2023	October 20, 2023 (FR, IT, LATAM, UK and IE)	Strange Way of Life	Pedro Almodóvar	Italy, Latin America
October 18, 2023 (US); October 26, 2023 (LATAM); October 27, 2023 (CA); March 21, 2024 (DE); March 22, 2024 (UK and IE); April 11, 2024 (IT)	May 24, 2024	The Delinquents	Rodrigo Moreno	Austria, Benelux, Germany, India, Italy, Latin America, North America, Turkey
November 3, 2023 (UK); November 16, 2023 (LATAM); November 29, 2023 (BE and LU); February 1, 2024 (IT); February 15, 2024 (NL)	April 5, 2024	How to Have Sex	Molly Manning Walker	Benelux, Italy, Latin America, North America, Turkey, UK and Ireland
November 17, 2023 (US); November 24, 2023 (CA); December 1, 2023 (UK and IE); December 7, 2023 (CL and MX)	January 19, 2024	Fallen Leaves	Aki Kaurismäki	India, Latin America, North America, Turkey, UK and Ireland
November 23, 2023 (DE)	December 8, 2023	Dead Girls Dancing	Anna Roller	Austria and Germany
December 1, 2023		Inshallah a Boy	Amjad Al Rasheed	Turkey
December 15, 2023 (IN); December 26, 2023 (LATAM, UK and IE); January 4, 2024 (DE)	March 1, 2024	Priscilla	Sofia Coppola	Austria, Benelux, Germany, India, Latin America, Turkey, UK and Ireland

=== 2024 ===
Theatrical release	Release on Mubi	Film	Director(s)	Countries
January 12, 2024 (US); February 15, 2024 (DE); March 7, 2024 (IT)	March 29, 2024	The Settlers	Felipe Gálvez	Austria, Benelux, Germany, India, Italy, Latin America, North America, Switzerland, Turkey, UK and Ireland
February 15, 2024		The Last Year of Darkness	Ben Mullinkosson	India, Latin America, North America, Turkey, UK and Ireland
February 15, 2024 (AR, CL, CO, MX, PE, VE, UY); February 23, 2024 (UK and IE); March 21, 2024 (CR, DO, HN)	April 12, 2024	Perfect Days	Wim Wenders	India, Latin America, Turkey, UK and Ireland
March 8, 2024 (UK and IE); March 14, 2024 (CL and MX); April 11, 2024 (DE)	April 26, 2024	High & Low – John Galliano	Kevin Macdonald	Austria, Benelux, Germany, India, North America, Southeast Asia, Turkey, UK and Ireland
March 8, 2024	August 10, 2024	Memory	Michel Franco	Turkey
March 22, 2024 (US)	May 3, 2024	Do Not Expect Too Much from the End of the World	Radu Jude	Australia, Austria, Benelux, Germany, India, Latin America, Middle East, New Zealand, North America, South Africa, Southeast Asia, Turkey
April 5, 2024		Yannick	Quentin Dupieux	Worldwide (excl. Baltics, Belgium, Canada, France, Italy, Portugal, Spain and Switzerland)
May 10, 2024 (US)	May 31, 2024	Gasoline Rainbow	Ross Brothers	Worldwide
June 20, 2024 (DE)	June 28, 2024 (LATAM, FR, IT, IN, TR, DE)	Made in England: The Films of Powell and Pressburger	David Hinton	Austria, Benelux, France, Germany, India, Italy, Latin America, Switzerland, Turkey
July 11, 2024 (AR, BR and UY); July 18, 2024 (DE); July 19, 2024 (US, UK and IE); July 26, 2024 (CA); July 2024 (CO, PE, EC and BO)	August 30, 2024	Crossing	Levan Akin	Austria, Germany, Latin America, North America, UK and Ireland
August 22, 2024 (MX)	October 4, 2024	Motel Destino	Karim Aïnouz	Latin America (excl. Brazil)
September 20, 2024 (CA, DE, LATAM, NL, US, UK and IE); November 1, 2024 (TR)	October 31, 2024	The Substance	Coralie Fargeat	Austria, Benelux, Germany, India, Latin America, North America, Turkey, UK and Ireland
September 27, 2024		The Fall (4K restoration)	Tarsem	Austria, Benelux, Germany, India, Italy, Latin America, North America, Switzerland, Turkey, UK and Ireland
October 18, 2024		Self-Portrait as a Coffee Pot	William Kentridge	Worldwide
October 25, 2024 (US, UK and IE); October 2024 (DE, MX, CL and AR); November 1, 2024 (CA)	December 13, 2024	Dahomey	Mati Diop	Austria, Benelux, Germany, India, Italy, Latin America, Middle East, North America, Switzerland, Turkey, UK and Ireland
November 8, 2024 (US, UK and IE)	December 23, 2024	Bird	Andrea Arnold	North America, Turkey, UK and Ireland
November 22, 2024		Witches	Elizabeth Sankey	Worldwide
November 27, 2024	December 11, 2024	Maria	Pablo Larraín	Canada
December 6, 2024		Emilia Pérez	Jacques Audiard	India and Turkey
December 6, 2024 (US, CA); January 9, 2025 (DE, LATAM); January 10, 2025 (UK)	January 24, 2025	The Girl with the Needle	Magnus von Horn	Austria, Germany, India, Italy, Latin America, North America, Turkey, UK and Ireland
December 12, 2024 (MX); December 13, 2024 (UK, IE and CA); December 25, 2024 (DE); January 23, 2025 (NL)	January 31, 2025	Queer	Luca Guadagnino	Austria, Benelux, Canada, Germany, India, Latin America, Spain, Turkey, UK and Ireland

=== 2025 ===
Theatrical release	Release on Mubi	Film	Director(s)	Countries
January 17, 2025	February 21, 2025	Grand Theft Hamlet	Sam Crane and Pinny Grylls	Worldwide (excl. UK and Ireland theatrical)
February 7, 2025 (US, CA, MX, UK and IE)	March 28, 2025	Bring Them Down	Christopher Andrews	Benelux, Italy, Latin America, North America, Turkey, UK and Ireland
February 21, 2025 (UK); March 6, 2025 (DE)	April 11, 2025	September Says	Ariane Labed	Austria, Germany, Turkey, UK
March 28, 2025	May 16, 2025	The End	Joshua Oppenheimer	Austria, Germany, UK and Ireland
March 28, 2025 (US, AR and MX)	April 18, 2025	Grand Tour	Miguel Gomes	Austria, Germany, India, Latin America, North America, Turkey, UK and Ireland
April 25, 2025 (US); May 2, 2025 (CA); May 16, 2025 (UK and IE)	June 6, 2025 (US, CA, UK and IE); November 14, 2025	Magic Farm	Amalia Ulman	Worldwide
May 2, 2025	November 21, 2025	Hysteria	Mehmet Akif Büyükatalay	Turkey
May 22, 2025 (DE); July 18, 2025 (UK, IE, MX and CL); August 1, 2025 (US)	August 8, 2025	Harvest	Athina Rachel Tsangari	Austria, Benelux, Germany, Latin America, North America, UK and Ireland
July 4, 2025 (UK, IE, DE and LATAM)	August 22, 2025	Hot Milk	Rebecca Lenkiewicz	Austria, Germany, India, Italy, Latin America, Spain, Turkey, UK and Ireland
July 11, 2025		Pavements	Alex Ross Perry	Austria, Canada, France, Germany, UK and Ireland
August 1, 2025 (CA, DE, IN, LATAM and TR); August 29, 2025 (AU)		April	Dea Kulumbegashvili	Asia, Australia, Austria, Canada, Czech Republic, Germany, Hungary, Israel, Latin America, New Zealand, Nordics, Romania, South Africa, Switzerland, Turkey
August 22, 2025 (US); August 29, 2025 (CA)	October 10, 2025	Lurker	Alex Russell	North America
August 29, 2025 (TR); October 15, 2025 (IN); January 22, 2026 (NL)		The Ugly Stepsister	Emilie Bliechfeldt	Benelux, India, Turkey
August 29, 2025	April 24, 2026	Agon	Giulio Bertelli	Italy
August 29, 2025 (US, CA, UK, LATAM, DE, FR, IT, NL and IN); September 5, 2025 (TR)		Vice Is Broke	Eddie Huang	Austria, Benelux, France, Germany, India, Italy, Latin America, North America, Turkey, UK and Ireland
September 12, 2025 (US); September 19, 2025 (CA)	November 1, 2025	The History of Sound	Oliver Hermanus	North America
October 2, 2025 (AR and CO); October 9, 2025 (BO, CAM, CL, EC, MX, PE and UY); June 12, 2026 (NY and LA); June 19, 2026 (US)	October 25, 2025 (LATAM); July 10, 2026 (WW)	Amores perros (4K restoration)	Alejandro González Iñárritu	Worldwide
October 16, 2025 (LATAM and DE); October 17, 2025 (US); October 23, 2025 (NL); October 24, 2025 (CA, UK and IE); October 30, 2025 (IT); October 31, 2025 (ES); February 18, 2026 (BE)	December 12, 2025	The Mastermind	Kelly Reichardt	Austria, Benelux, Germany, India, Italy, Latin America, North America, Turkey, UK and Ireland
November 6, 2025 (AU and MX); November 7, 2025 (CA, UK, IE and US); November 13, 2025 (AT and DE); November 14, 2025 (ES); November 20, 2025 (NL); November 27, 2025 (BR, IT and NZ)	December 23, 2025 (AU, CA, LATAM and US); January 23, 2026 (BR, DE, ES, IE, IN, IT, NL, TR and UK)	Die My Love	Lynne Ramsay	Australia, Austria, Benelux, Germany, India, Italy, Latin America, New Zealand, North America, Spain, Switzerland, Turkey, UK and Ireland
December 4, 2025 (LATAM); December 5, 2025 (UK and IE); January 8, 2026 (DE)	March 6, 2026	It Was Just an Accident	Jafar Panahi	Austria, Germany, India, Latin America, Turkey, UK and Ireland
December 5, 2025 (US); December 12, 2025 (CA); March 19, 2026 (DE and NL); March 19, 2026 (LATAM); March 20, 2026 (UK and IE); April 1, 2026 (ES)	February 6, 2026 (CA and US); May 8, 2026 (AU, DE, ES, IN, LATAM, NL, TR, UK and IE)	La grazia	Paolo Sorrentino	Australia, Austria, Benelux, Germany, India, Latin America, New Zealand, North America, Spain, Turkey, UK and Ireland
December 24, 2025 (US); April 9, 2026 (LATAM); April 10, 2026 (UK and IE); April 16, 2026 (NL)	February 27, 2026 (CA, TR and US); May 29, 2026 (IN, LATAM, UK and IE)	Father Mother Sister Brother	Jim Jarmusch	Benelux, India, Latin America, North America, Turkey, UK and Ireland
December 25, 2025 (LATAM); December 26, 2025 (TR, UK and IE)	February 13, 2026	Sentimental Value	Joachim Trier	India, Latin America, Turkey, UK and Ireland
December 31, 2025 (US); February 6, 2026 (CA, IT, UK and IE); March 6, 2026 (ES)	April 10, 2026	My Father's Shadow	Akinola Davies Jr.	Australia, Austria, Germany, Italy, New Zealand, North America, Spain, Turkey, UK and Ireland

=== 2026 ===
Theatrical release	on Mubi	Film	Director(s)	Countries
January 8, 2026 (IT)	February 13, 2026	Sirāt	Óliver Laxe	India, Italy, Turkey
January 9, 2026 (TR); January 13, 2026 (ES); January 15, 2026 (AU and LATAM); January 23, 2026 (UK and IE); February 5, 2026 (NL); February 11, 2026 (BE)	March 13, 2026	No Other Choice	Park Chan-wook	Australia, Benelux, Latin America, New Zealand, SAARC, Spain, Turkey, UK and Ireland
January 16, 2026 (CA and US); March 6, 2026 (UK and IE)	April 24, 2026	Sound of Falling	Mascha Schilinski	India, North America, Turkey, UK and Ireland
February 5, 2026 (CL and MX); February 26, 2026 (BR)	April 10, 2026	Arco	Ugo Bienvenu	Latin America
February 20, 2026 (UK and IE); February 26, 2026 (LATAM excl. BR)	April 17, 2026	The Secret Agent	Kleber Mendonça Filho	Latin America (excl. Brazil), UK and Ireland
March 6, 2026 (US); March 13, 2026 (CA)	March 27, 2026	Pompei: Below the Clouds	Gianfranco Rosi	Australia, Austria, Germany, India, Latin America, New Zealand, North America, Spain, Switzerland, Turkey, UK and Ireland
April 3, 2026		My Undesirable Friends: Part I — Last Air in Moscow	Julia Loktev	Worldwide (excl. Russia and Belarus)
April 23, 2026 (DE); July 8, 2026 (IT); July 10, 2026 (UK and IE); July 24, 2026 (US); August 7, 2026 (CA)	November 13, 2026	Rosebush Pruning	Karim Aïnouz	Australia, Austria, India, Italy, Germany, Latin America, New Zealand, North America, Turkey, UK and Ireland
May 7, 2026 (NL); May 15, 2026 (DE, UK and IE)	June 19, 2026	Orphan	László Nemes	Austria, Benelux, Germany, Italy, Latin America, Switzerland, Turkey, UK and Ireland
May 15, 2026		The Mysterious Gaze of the Flamingo	Diego Céspedes	Australia, India, Italy, Netherlands, New Zealand, Turkey, UK and Ireland
May 22, 2026		Peter Hujar's Day	Ira Sachs	Eastern Europe (excl. Poland and Hungary theatrical), Greece, India, Italy, Latin America, Middle East, Portugal, Turkey
May 28, 2026 (AR); June 4, 2026 (BR, MX and CL)	July 17, 2026	Alpha	Julia Ducournau	India, Latin America
June 12, 2026	TBA	The Fall of Sir Douglas Weatherford	Sean Robert Dunn	UK and Ireland
July 2, 2026 (AR, CL, CO, MX and UY)	September 4, 2026	Flies	Fernando Eimbcke	Latin America
July 24, 2026		A Useful Ghost	Ratchapoom Boonbunchachoke	Australia, India, Italy, Latin America, Spain, Turkey, UK and Ireland
August 6, 2026 (AU); August 7, 2026 (CA and US); August 13, 2026 (AR, BR, CO, CL, MX and UY); August 19, 2026 (IT); August 20, 2026 (DE and NZ); August 21, 2026 (UK and IE); November 20, 2026 (ES)	October 2, 2026	Teenage Sex and Death at Camp Miasma	Jane Schoenbrun	Australia, Austria, Benelux, Germany, India, Italy, Latin America, New Zealand, North America, Spain, Switzerland, Turkey, UK and Ireland
September 18, 2026 (UK and IE); September 23, 2026 (CA); September 24, 2026 (US and MX)	September 25, 2026	Pulp: What Do You Do for an Encore?	Garth Jennings	Worldwide
September 25, 2026 (LATAM, UK and IE); September 30, 2026 (IT); October 23, 2026 (ES)	November 27, 2026	Her Private Hell	Nicolas Winding Refn	Italy, Latin America, Spain, UK and Ireland
October 8, 2026 (DE, BR); October 30, 2026 (ES and LATAM); November 5, 2026 (IT)	December 4, 2026	Hope	Na Hong-jin	Austria, Germany, Italy, Latin America, Spain, Switzerland, Turkey
October 8, 2026 (US)	TBA	My Undesirable Friends: Part II – Exile	Julia Loktev	Worldwide (excl. Russia and Belarus)
October 23, 2026 (US, LATAM, UK and IE); October 29, 2026 (BR); October 16, 2026 (IT); October 30, 2026 (CA); November 12, 2026 (AU); November 19, 2026 (NL); December 4, 2026 (ES)	TBA	Fatherland	Paweł Pawlikowski	Australia, Benelux, India, Italy, Latin America, New Zealand, North America, Spain, Turkey, UK and Ireland
October 23, 2026		Junk	Jack Begert	Worldwide
October 23, 2026 (CA, US, UK and IE)	November 6, 2026	Making Marie Antoinette	Eleanor Coppola	Worldwide
November 5, 2026 (DE); November 20, 2026 (CA, LATAM and US); November 27, 2026 (UK and IE)	TBA	Minotaur	Andrey Zvyagintsev	Austria, Germany, Latin America, North America, Switzerland, UK and Ireland
November 6, 2026 (LA); December 4, 2026 (CA, NY, UK and IE)	TBA	Nuisance Bear	Gabriela Osio Vanden and Jack Weisman	Worldwide
November 20, 2026	TBA	What Remains	Yeşim Ustaoğlu	Turkey

== Upcoming ==
Release date	Film	Director(s)	Countries
December 4, 2026 (NY); January 15, 2027 (UK and IE); January 22, 2027 (US); February 11, 2027 (NL); February 18, 2027 (AT, DE, ES, IT and LATAM)	A Long Winter	Andrew Haigh	Australia, Austria, Benelux, Germany, India, Italy, Latin America, New Zealand, Spain, Turkey, US, UK and Ireland
December 11, 2026 (US); January 21, 2027 (AR); January 28, 2027 (CL and MX); February 4, 2027 (IT); February 5, 2027 (UK and IE)	Rose	Markus Schleinzer	Australia, Italy, Latin America, New Zealand, North America, Turkey, UK and Ireland
December 25, 2026 (CA and US); December 31, 2026 (DE and LATAM); January 1, 2027 (ES, UK and IE); January 5, 2027 (IT); January 7, 2027 (AU)	Coward	Lukas Dhont	Australia, Austria, Germany, Italy, Latin America, New Zealand, North America, Spain, Turkey, UK and Ireland

=== Undated ===
Release date	Film	Director(s)	Countries
2027	Cameron Winter at Carnegie Hall	Paul Thomas Anderson	Worldwide (excl. North America)
TBC	The Illusion of an Everlasting Summer	Alessandra Sanguinetti	North America, UK and Ireland

== In production ==
Release date	Film	Director(s)	Countries	Notes
TBC	Last Days	Matt Copson	Worldwide (excl. Spain)	Post-production
TBC	Let Love In	Felix van Groeningen	TBA	Post-production
TBC	Maniac Cop	Nicolas Winding Refn	Australia, Benelux, France, Italy, Latin America, New Zealand, North America, Spain, Turkey, UK and Ireland	Pre-production
TBC	Unknownia	Dash Shaw	TBA	Post-production

== Series released ==
Release date	Series	Director(s)	Countries	Notes
November 13, 2022 (series 1 remaster); November 20, 2022 (series 2 remaster); November 27, 2022 (Exodus)	The Kingdom	Lars von Trier	Eastern Europe, India, Latin America, Middle East, North America, Southeast Asia, Turkey, UK and Ireland	Drama series
September 10, 2025	Mussolini: Son of the Century	Joe Wright	Belgium, India, Latin America, Luxembourg, New Zealand, North America, Turkey	Miniseries
October 19, 2025	Hal & Harper	Cooper Raiff	France, Latin America, U.S.	Comedy series
December 3, 2025	The New Years	Rodrigo Sorogoyen, Sandra Romero and David Martín de los Santos	Australia, India, Latin America, Netherlands, New Zealand, North America, Turkey, UK and Ireland	Miniseries
February 26, 2026	Blossoms Shanghai	Wong Kar-wai	Austria, Benelux, France, Germany, India, Italy, Latin America, Switzerland, Turkey	Miniseries
September 3, 2026	La mesías	Javier Calvo, Javier Ambrossi	United Kingdom, Canada, Turkey, Netherlands, Germany, Australia	Miniseries
September 19, 2026	JAŸ-Z In 8	Rick Rubin	Worldwide (excl. North America)	Docuseries
