= Frédéric Fiore =

French entrepreneur and film producer

- Education: École Centrale de Lyon
- Occupations: Entrepreneur, film producer, film financier

Frédéric Fiore is a French entrepreneur, film financier and producer. He is the president and chairman of Logical Pictures, a film and television financing and production company established in 2016.

He has served as a producer and executive producer on films including Swallow, Pleasure, Wild Indian and The Weight.

He has also co-founded several businesses, including the creative production company Loveboat and investment firms Capitem Partenaires and Jadel.

== Education and early career ==
Fiore graduated as an engineer from the École Centrale de Lyon in 1998. He began his career in technology and strategic consulting. Fiore founded and managed Garderisettes, a childcare company. In 2009, Garderisettes combined with Paris-based nursery company Babilou, forming a national childcare group. He was the international general manager of Babilou, overseeing its global operations until 2016.

== Film career ==
=== Logical pictures ===
Fiore co-founded Logical Pictures in 2016, with the company focusing on English-language genre films by emerging European directors. At that time, Fiore said the company planned to provide gap financing of around €500,000 to €1 million for third-party projects, while gradually developing and financing projects in-house.

In 2020, it was announced plans for Logical Pictures to launch a film and television investment fund, up to €100 million, with Fiore as the chairman. The fund would support development and production financing, including independent drama series and first features, as well as more prestigious projects with budgets of €12 million to €15 million.

In a 2022 interview with Cineuropa, speaking about private financing, Fiore said that freedom in terms of content was dependent on private financing, which could allow the company to support more atypical projects beyond broadcasters' target audiences.

In 2023, Logical Content Ventures, a fund launched by Logical Pictures Group and managed by Logical Pictures, received an equity investment of up to €25 million through the European Commission and European Investment Fund's MediaInvest programme. Fiore described LCV as "very flexible," stating that the fund invests against worldwide rights and recoups its investments through international minimum guarantees and P&A for a film's domestic-market release.

In January 2021, Fiore co-founded Loveboat, a creative production company based in Los Angeles and Paris, alongside Jeff Baron, Greg Panteix and Nicolas Winding Refn. The company produces projects across advertising, entertainment and fiction and is associated with Logical Pictures Group.

In January 2023, Logical Pictures, with Fiore as the president, entered into a three-year co-production and co-financing deal with Pathé. Through Logical Content Ventures, the partnership was intended to bring private investors into the financing of Pathé's theatrical films, with more than 20 films expected to benefit from Logical's financial input through 2025. In a 2024 interview with Deadline, Fiore said that the company was continuing its co-investment partnership with Pathé and was launching Logical African Stories, a fund intended to invest in films, television series and companies in Africa.

=== Producing ===
Fiore has served as producer, co-producer and executive producer on films financed or produced through Logical Pictures.

In 2018, he produced the psychological thriller film Swallow, directed by Carlo Mirabella-Davis and starring Haley Bennett.

In 2021, Fiore was a co-producer of Pleasure, directed by Ninja Thyberg and an executive producer of Wild Indian, directed by Lyle Mitchell Corbine Jr., both of which premiered at the 2021 Sundance Film Festival. In the same year, he produced A Nightmare Wakes, written and directed by Nora Unkel.

In 2022, Fiore co-produced Tchaikovsky's Wife, directed by Kirill Serebrennikov, which was selected for competition at the 2022 Cannes Film Festival.

In 2026, Fiore served as an executive producer of The Weight, directed by Padraic McKinley and starring Ethan Hawke and Russell Crowe.

=== Industry activities ===
In September 2025, Fiore participated in the fourth annual Creative Investors' Conference at the San Sebastián International Film Festival, which brought together film-industry executives and investors to discuss financing and developments in the audiovisual sector.

In July 2026, Fiore was announced as a speaker at Screen International's "Financing the Future of UK Film" summit, held at the BFI Southbank in London.

== Other activities ==
In 2013, Fiore co-founded Capitem Partenaires, an independent investment firm based in Lyon, alongside Stéphane Grès and Hervé Letoublon. The firm completed the first closing of its Capitem I fund at €20 million, backed by around 20 business leaders. It focused on investing in profitable small and medium-sized companies through minority development-capital and majority LBO transactions.

In May 2021, Fiore co-founded Jadel, an evergreen investment company based in Lyon, with Hervé Letoublon and Laurent Mottet. The company sought to raise €35 million for investment.

== Selected filmography ==
Year	Title	Role
2017	Revenge	Co-producer
2018	Farming	Executive producer
2019	Swallow	Producer
2019	Never Grow Old	Associate producer
2019	Sympathy for the Devil	Co-producer
2020	The Owners	Co-producer
2020	A Nightmare Wakes	Producer
2021	Wild Indian	Executive producer
2021	Pleasure	Co-producer
2021	The Deep House	Producer
2021	Petrov's Flu	Co-producer
2022	Tchaikovsky's Wife	Co-producer
2023	Resurrected	Executive producer
2023	Acid	Co-producer
2024	A Sacrifice	Executive producer
2024	Emmanuelle	Associate producer
2026	The Weight	Executive producer
2026	Faith	Executive producer
