= Anthony Lane bibliography =

British journalist and film critic

A list of works by or about Anthony Lane, British journalist and film critic.

== Books ==
- Lane, Anthony (2002). Nobody's perfect : writings from the New Yorker. New York: Knopf.

== Essays and reporting ==
=== 1992–1999 ===
- Lane, Anthony (November 9, 1992). "Beckett's last book". The Talk of the Town. The New Yorker: 41.
- — (February 1, 1993). "Flights of fancy". The Critics. The Current Cinema. The New Yorker. 68 (50): 96–98. Reviews Maurizio Nichetti's Volere Volare (1991) and Lucian Pintilie's The Oak (1992).
- — (February 15, 1993). "Gotta tango!". The Critics. The Current Cinema. The New Yorker. 68 (52): 95–98. Reviews Baz Luhrmann's Strictly Ballroom (1992) and Tony Bill's Untamed Heart (1993).
- — (March 15, 1993). "Revenge of the nerd". The Critics. The Current Cinema. The New Yorker. 69 (4): 119–121. Reviews John McNaughton's Mad Dog and Glory (1993) and Jacques Dorfmann and Pierre Magny's Shadow of the Wolf (1993).
- — (March 29, 1993). "Crash courses". The Critics. The Current Cinema. The New Yorker. 69 (6).
- — (April 12, 1993). "Drifters". The Critics. The Current Cinema. The New Yorker. 69 (8): 111–112, 114.

=== 2000–2009 ===
- Lane, Anthony (November 3, 2008). "Let's put on a show!". The Critics. The Current Cinema. The New Yorker. 84 (35): 122–123. Reviews Charlie Kaufman's Synecdoche, New York (2008) and Kenny Ortega's High School Musical 3 (2008).
- — (November 24, 2008). "Hard times". The Critics. The Current Cinema. The New Yorker. 84 (38): 130–131. Reviews Danny Boyle's Slumdog Millionaire (2008) and Arnaud Desplechin's A Christmas Tale (2008).

=== 2010–2014 ===
- Lane, Anthony (March 15, 2010). "Under the gun". The Critics. The Current Cinema. The New Yorker. 86 (4): 82–83. Reviews Paul Greengrass' Green Zone (2010) and Bong Joon-ho's Mother (2009).
- — (April 5, 2010). "The 401st blow". Goings on About Town. Critic's Notebook. The New Yorker. 86 (8): 13. Reviews Maurice Pialat's L’enfance Nue (1968).
- — (April 26, 2010). "Street justice". The Critics. The Current Cinema. The New Yorker. 86 (10). Reviews Matthew Vaughn's Kick-Ass (2010) and Banksy's Exit Through the Gift Shop (2010).
- — (May 24, 2010). "Open House". Goings on About Town. Critic's Notebook. The New Yorker. 86 (14): 10. Reviews João César Monteiro's Hovering Over the Water (1986).
- — (May 24, 2010). "Straight Arrows". The Critics. The Current Cinema. The New Yorker. 86 (14): 82–83. Reviews Ridley Scott's Robin Hood (2010).
- — (November 15, 2010). "Long Roads". The Critics. The Current Cinema. The New Yorker. 86 (36). Reviews Todd Phillips' Due Date (2010) and Chris Morris's Four Lions (2010).
- — (March 14, 2011). "And the Oscar will go to ..." Shouts and Murmurs. The New Yorker. 87 (4): 28.
- — (April 4, 2011). "Time bomb". The Critics. The Current Cinema. The New Yorker. 87 (4): 82–83. Reviews Susanne Bier's In a Better World (2010) and James Gunn's Super (2010).
- — (November 7, 2011). "Home movies". The Critics. The Current Cinema. The New Yorker. 87 (35): 90–91. Reviews Brett Ratner's Tower Heist (2011) and Lars von Trier's Melancholia (2011).
- — (November 19–26, 2011). "Theatre on film". The Critics. The Current Cinema. The New Yorker. 87 (41). Reviews Wim Wenders's Pina (2011) and Roman Polanski's Carnage (2011).
- — (January 2, 2012). "Stings of desire". Goings on About Town. Critic's Notebook. The New Yorker. 87 (42): 14. Reviews Otto Preminger's Laura (1944).
- — (February 13–20, 2012). "Fright nights". The Critics. Books. The New Yorker. 88 (1): 105–108.
- — (April 16, 2012). "They, the people". Goings on About Town. Critic's Notebook. The New Yorker. 88 (9): 9. Reviews Boris Barnet's Outskirts (1933).
- — (November 19, 2012). "The war at home". Goings on About Town. Critic's Notebook. The New Yorker. 88 (36): 9.
- — (November 19, 2012). "House divided". The Critics. The Current Cinema. The New Yorker. 88 (36): 82–84. Reviews Steven Spielberg's Lincoln (2012).
- — (December 3, 2012). "Tough times". The Critics. The Current Cinema. The New Yorker. 88 (38): 112–113. Reviews Andrew Dominik's Killing Them Softly (2012) and Jacques Audiard's Rust and Bone (2012).
- — (January 7, 2013). "Love hurts". The Critics. The Current Cinema. The New Yorker. 88 (42): 80–81. Reviews Tom Hooper's Les Misérables (2012), Quentin Tarantino's Django Unchained (2012) and Michael Haneke's Amour (2012).
- — (February 4, 2013). "The evil that men do". The Critics. The Current Cinema. The New Yorker. 88 (46): 78–79. Reviews Paolo and Vittorio Taviani's Caesar Must Die (2012) and Kim Jee-Woon's The Last Stand (2013).
- — (February 25, 2013). "Ways to win". The Critics. The Current Cinema. The New Yorker. 89 (2): 84–85. Reviews John Moore's A Good Day to Die Hard (2012) and Gael García Bernal's No (2012).
- — (March 11, 2013). "Mad about you". The Critics. The Current Cinema. The New Yorker. 89 (4): 80–81. Reviews Park Chan-wook's Stoker (2013) and Cristian Mungiu's Beyond the Hills (2012).
- — (March 18, 2013). "Red shift". Goings on About Town. Critic's Notebook. The New Yorker. 89 (5): 12. Reviews Andrzej Wajda's Ashes and Diamonds (1958).
- — (March 25, 2013). "Fun in the sun". The Critics. The Current Cinema. The New Yorker. 89 (6): 108–109. Reviews Harmony Korine's Spring Breakers (2012) and Matteo Garrone's Reality (2012).
- — (April 8, 2013). "Mind games". The Critics. The Current Cinema. The New Yorker. 89 (8): 88–89. Reviews Danny Boyle's Trance (2013) and Pablo Berger's Blancanieves (2012).
- — (April 22, 2013). "Criminal elements". Goings on About Town. Critic's Notebook. The New Yorker. 89 (10): 26. Reviews Jean-Pierre Melville's Un flic (1972).
- — (April 29, 2013). "Home fronts". The Critics. The Current Cinema. The New Yorker. 89 (11): 82–83. Reviews Joseph Kosinski's Oblivion (2013) and François Ozon's In the House (2012).
- — (May 6, 2013). "Battle weary". The Critics. The Current Cinema. The New Yorker. 89 (12): 88–89. Reviews Shane Black's Iron Man 3 (2013) and Olivier Assayas' Something in the Air (2012).
- — (June 3, 2013). "Never alone". The Critics. The Current Cinema. The New Yorker. 89 (16): 74–75. Reviews Jordan Vogt-Roberts's The Kings of Summer (2013) and Justin Lin's Fast & Furious 6 (2013).
- — (July 8–15, 2013). "In transit". The Critics. The Current Cinema. The New Yorker. 89 (20): 94–95. Reviews Nat Faxon and Jim Rash's The Way, Way Back (2013) and Pedro Almodóvar's I'm so Excited! (2013).
- — (July 22, 2013). "Grim tidings". The Critics. The Current Cinema. The New Yorker. 89 (21): 80–81. Reviews Guillermo del Toro's Pacific Rim (2013), Nicolas Winding Refn's Only God Forgives (2013) and Joshua Oppenheimer's The Act of Killing (2012).
- — (September 30, 2013). "Fast moves". The Critics. The Current Cinema. The New Yorker. 89 (30): 84–85. Reviews Ron Howard's Rush (2013) and Stuart Blumberg's Thanks for Sharing (2012).
- — (October 28, 2013). "New love". The Critics. The Current Cinema. The New Yorker. 89 (34): 82–83. Reviews Abdellatif Kechiche's Blue is the Warmest Color (2013).
- — (November 25, 2013). "Roman conquests". The Critics. The Current Cinema. The New Yorker. 89 (38): 134–135. Reviews Paolo Sorrentino's The Great Beauty (2013) and Stephen Frears' Philomena (2013).
- — (December 23–30, 2013). "Only make believe". The Critics. The Current Cinema. The New Yorker. 89 (42): 130–131. Reviews Spike Jonze's Her (2013), Ben Stiller's The Secret Life of Walter Mitty (2013) and John Lee Hancock's Saving Mr. Banks (2013).
- — (February 10, 2014). "The cost of survival". The Critics. The Current Cinema. The New Yorker. 89 (48): 84–85. Reviews Claude Lanzmann's The Last of the Unjust (2013).
- — (March 3, 2014). "Best bets". The Talk of the Town. Comment. The New Yorker. 90 (2): 23–24.
- — (March 3, 2014). "Following orders". The Critics. The Current Cinema. The New Yorker. 90 (2): 84–85. Reviews Hany Abu-Assad's Omar (2013) and Phil Lord and Christopher Miller's The Lego Movie (2014).
- — (March 17, 2014). "Double trouble". The Critics. The Current Cinema. The New Yorker. 90 (4): 78–79. Reviews Denis Villeneuve's Enemy (2013) and Roger Michell's Le Week-End (2013).
- — (March 24, 2014). "Her again : the unstoppable Scarlett Johansson". Onward and Upward with the Arts. The New Yorker. 90 (5): 56–63.
- — (March 31, 2014). "Candid camera". The Critics. The Current Cinema. The New Yorker. 90 (6): 80–81. Reviews John Maloof and Charlie Siskel's Finding Vivian Maier (2013) and Bertrand Tavernier's The French Minister (2013).
- — (April 14, 2014). "After darkness". The Critics. The Current Cinema. The New Yorker. 90 (8): 86–87. Reviews Jim Jarmusch's Only Lovers Left Alive (2013) and David Gordon Green's Joe (2013).
- — (May 12, 2014). "Road trips". The Critics. The Current Cinema. The New Yorker. 90 (12): 82–83. Reviews Pawel Pawlikowski's Ida (2013) and Jon Favreau's Chef (2014).
- — (August 4, 2014). "Big men". The Critics. The Current Cinema. The New Yorker. 90 (22): 74–75. Reviews John Michael McDonagh's Calvary (2014) and Jonathan Demme's A Master Builder (2013).
- — (August 25, 2014). "Hide and seek". The Critics. The Current Cinema. The New Yorker. 90 (24): 74–75. Reviews Lenny Abrahamson's Frank (2014) and Ira Sachs' Love is Strange (2014).
- — (October 20, 2014). "High fliers". The Critics. The Current Cinema. The New Yorker. 90 (32): 106–107. Reviews Alejandro González Iñárritu's Birdman (2014) and Damien Chazelle's Whiplash (2014).
- — (December 15, 2014). "Swinging Seventies". The Critics. The Current Cinema. The New Yorker. 90 (40): 76–77. Reviews Paul Thomas Anderson's Inherent Vice (2014).

=== 2015–2019 ===
- Lane, Anthony (February 2, 2015). "Adventures in Rothland". The Critics. The Current Cinema. The New Yorker. 90 (46): 62–64. Reviews Barry Levinson's The Humbling (2014) and Abderrahmane Sissako's Timbuktu (2014).
- — (February 16, 2015). "Society of men". The Critics. The Current Cinema. The New Yorker. 91 (1): 64–66. Reviews Matthew Vaughn's Kingsman: The Secret Service (2014) and Taika Waititi and Jemaine Clement's What We Do in the Shadows (2014).
- — (March 16, 2015). "Young love". The Critics. The Current Cinema. The New Yorker. 91 (4): 88–89. Reviews Kenneth Branagh's Cinderella (2015) and David Robert Mitchell's It Follows (2014).
- — (April 13, 2015). "Feelings". The Critics. The Current Cinema. The New Yorker. 91 (8): 82–83. Reviews Alex Garland's Ex Machina (2014) and Asghar Farhadi's About Elly (2009).
- — (April 20, 2015). "Way up high". The Critics. The Current Cinema. The New Yorker. 91 (9): 96–97. Reviews Olivier Assayas' Clouds of Sils Maria (2014).
- — (May 4, 2015). "Fighting on". The Critics. The Current Cinema. The New Yorker. 91 (11): 62–64. Reviews Joss Whedon's Avengers : Age of Ultron (2015) and Thomas Vinterberg's Far from the Madding Crowd (2015).
- — (May 18, 2015). "Distant emotions". The Critics. The Current Cinema. The New Yorker. 91 (13): 102–103. Reviews Andrew Niccol's Good Kill (2014) and John Maclean's Slow West (2015).
- — (May 25, 2015). "High gear". The Critics. The Current Cinema. The New Yorker. 91 (14): 68–70. Reviews George Miller's Mad Max: Fury Road (2015).
- — (June 29, 2015). "Head trips". The Critics. The Current Cinema. The New Yorker. 91 (18): 76–77. Reviews Peter Docter's Inside Out (2015) and Andrea Di Stefano's Escobar : Paradise Lost (2014).
- — (July 20, 2015). "Cold cases". The Critics. The Current Cinema. The New Yorker. 91 (20): 76–77. Reviews Judd Apatow's Trainwreck (2015) and Bill Condon's Mr. Holmes (2015).
- — (July 27, 2015). "Small victories". The Critics. The Current Cinema. The New Yorker. 91 (21): 74–75. Reviews Peyton Reed's Ant-Man and Joshua Oppenheimer's The Look of Silence.
- — (November 23, 2015). "Secret lives". The Critics. The Current Cinema. The New Yorker. 91 (37): 120–121. Reviews Todd Haynes' Carol (2015) and Brian Helgeland's Legend (2015).
- — (December 7, 2015). "Toil and trouble". The Critics. The Current Cinema. The New Yorker. 91 (39): 82–83. Reviews Justin Kurzel's Macbeth (2015) and Paolo Sorrentino's Youth (2015).
- — (February 1, 2016). "Tough girls". The Critics. The Current Cinema. The New Yorker. 91 (46): 74–75. Reviews Gavin O'Connor's Jane Got a Gun and J. Blakeson's The Fifth Wave.
- — (February 22, 2016). "Fashion victims". The Critics. The Current Cinema. The New Yorker. 92 (2): 82–83. Reviews Ben Stiller's Zoolander 2 (2016) and Tobias Lindholm's A War (2015).
- — (February 29, 2016). "Spellbound". The Critics. The Current Cinema. The New Yorker. 92 (3): 78–79. Reviews Robert Eggers' The Witch.
- — (April 25, 2016). "Wild things". The Critics. The Current Cinema. The New Yorker. 92 (11): 102–103. Reviews Jon Favreau's The Jungle Book (2016) and Matteo Garrone's Tale of Tales (2015)
- — (May 23, 2016). "Daring duos". The Critics. The Current Cinema. The New Yorker. 92 (15): 84–85. Reviews Shane Black's The Nice Guys (2016) and Whit Stillman's Love & Friendship (2016).
- — (July 11–18, 2016). "Family ties". The Critics. The Current Cinema. The New Yorker. 92 (21): 88–89. Woody Allen's Café Society (2016) and Roger Ross Williams' Life, Animated (2016).
- — (August 8–15, 2016). "Find yourself". The Critics. The Current Cinema. The New Yorker. 92 (24): 80–81. Reviews Paul Greengrass's Jason Bourne (2016) and Ira Sachs' Little Men (2016).
- — (October 10, 2016). "In deep". The Critics. The Current Cinema. The New Yorker. 92 (32): 108–109. Reviews Andrea Arnold's American Honey (2016) and Peter Berg's Deepwater Horizon (2016).
- — (November 7, 2016). "Good fights". The Critics. The Current Cinema. The New Yorker. 92 (36): 82–83. Mel Gibson's Hacksaw Ridge and Jeff Nichols' Loving.
- — (December 19–26, 2016). "Mother lode". The Critics. The Current Cinema. The New Yorker. 92 (42): 130–131. Mike Mills' 20th Century Women and Pedro Almodóvar's Julieta.
- — (January 2, 2017). "Poets' corner". The Critics. The Current Cinema. The New Yorker. 92 (43): 76–77. Jim Jarmusch's Paterson and Pablo Larraín's Neruda.
- — (January 30, 2017). "Depths of fear". The Critics. The Current Cinema. The New Yorker. 92 (47): 76–77. Reviews Asghar Farhadi's The Salesman (2016) and M. Night Shyamalan's Split (2016).
- — (March 13, 2017). "Animal kingdoms". The Critics. The Current Cinema. The New Yorker. 93 (4): 114–115. Reviews Jordan Vogt-Roberts's Kong : Skull Island (2017) and Julia Ducournau's Raw (2016).
- — (March 13, 2017). "Last laugh : Jane Austen's final, surprising, unfinished novel". The New Yorker. 93 (4): 77–79.
- — (March 20, 2017). "The living dead". The Critics. The Current Cinema. The New Yorker. 93 (5): 100–101. Reviews Olivier Assayas' Personal Shopper (2016) and François Ozon's Frantz (2016).
- — (April 24, 2017). "Poetic license". The Critics. The Current Cinema. The New Yorker. 93 (10): 102–103. Reviews Terence Davies' A Quiet Passion (2016) and F. Gary Gray's The Fate of the Furious (2017).
- — (May 1, 2017). "Keeping cool : Jean-Pierre Melville's cinema of resistance". The Critics. A Critic at Large. The New Yorker. 93 (11): 70–73.
- — (June 19, 2017). "How the other half lives". The Critics. The Current Cinema. The New Yorker. 93 (17): 74–75. Reviews Ken Loach's I, Daniel Blake (2016) and Miguel Arteta's Beatriz at Dinner (2017).
- — (July 3, 2017). "Style and substance". The Critics. The Current Cinema. The New Yorker. 93 (19): 74–75. Reviews Edgar Wright's Baby Driver (2017) and Bertrand Tavernier's My Journey Through French Cinema (2016).
- — (August 21, 2017). "Desperadoes". The Critics. The Current Cinema. The New Yorker. 93 (24): 82–83. Reviews Josh Safdie and Benny Safdie's Good Time (2017) and Bertrand Bonello's Nocturama (2016).
- — (October 30, 2017). "Sacrificial victims". The Critics. The Current Cinema. The New Yorker. 93 (34): 78–79. Reviews Yorgos Lanthimos' The Killing of a Sacred Deer (2017) and Ruben Östlund's The Square (2017).
- — (November 6, 2017). "American conflicts". The Critics. The Current Cinema. The New Yorker. 93 (35): 74–75. Reviews George Clooney's Suburbicon (2017) and Richard Linklater's Last Flag Flying (2017).
- — (December 4, 2017). "Intertwined". The Critics. The Current Cinema. The New Yorker. 93 (39): 82–83. Reviews Luca Guadagnino's Call Me by Your Name (2017).
- — (February 12–19, 2018). "Ties that break". The Critics. The Current Cinema. The New Yorker. 94 (1): 104–105. Reviews Andrey Zvyagintsev's Loveless (2017) and Brian Crano's Permission (2017).
- — (April 2, 2018). "Unusual suspects". The Critics. The Current Cinema. The New Yorker. 94 (7): 94–95. Reviews Steven Soderbergh's Unsane (2018) and Aaron Katz's Gemini (2017).
- — (September 17, 2018). "Extralegal actions". The Critics. The Current Cinema. The New Yorker. 94 (28): 70–71. Reviews Richard Eyre's The Children Act (2018) and Robert Greene's Bisbee '17 (2018).
- — (January 7, 2019). "Togetherness". The Critics. The Current Cinema. The New Yorker. 94 (43): 72–73. Reviews Jon S. Baird's Stan & Ollie (2018) and Karyn Kusama's Destroyer (2018).
- — (February 11, 2019). "Eyes wide open". The Critics. The Current Cinema. The New Yorker. 94 (48): 72–73. Reviews Florian Henckel von Donnersmarck's Never Look Away (2018).
- — (March 4, 2019). "Badlands". The Critics. The Current Cinema. The New Yorker. 95 (2): 70–71. Reviews Ty Robert's The Iron Orchard and Christian Petzold's Transit (2018).
- — (May 20, 2019). "The write stuff". The Critics. The Current Cinema. The New Yorker. 95 (13): 85–86. Reviews Kenneth Branagh's All Is True (2018) and Dome Karukoski's Tolkien (2019).
- — (May 27, 2019). "Awkward ages". The Critics. The Current Cinema. The New Yorker. 95 (14): 76–77. Reviews Olivia Wilde's Booksmart (2019) and Joanna Hogg's The Souvenir (2019).
- — (June 3, 2019). "Wish list". The Critics. The Current Cinema. The New Yorker. 95 (15): 70–71. Reviews Guy Ritchie's Aladdin (2019) and Denys Arcand's The Fall of the American Empire (2018).
- — (November 18, 2019). "Wheels within wheels". The Critics. The Current Cinema. The New Yorker. 95 (36): 68–70. Reviews James Mangold's Ford v Ferrari (2019) and Mike Flanagan's Doctor Sleep (2019).

=== 2020–2024 ===
- Lane, Anthony (January 6, 2020). "Home comforts". The Critics. The Current Cinema. The New Yorker. 95 (43): 68–69. Reviews Greta Gerwig's Little Women (2019).
- — (January 13, 2020). "Witnesses". The Critics. The Current Cinema. The New Yorker. 95 (44): 72–73. Reviews Ladj Ly's Les Misérables (2019) and Chinonye Chukwu's Clemency (2019).
- — (June 1, 2020). "Folies à deux". The Critics. The Current Cinema. The New Yorker. 96 (15): 70–71. Reviews Benjamin Ree's The Painter and the Thief (2020) and Michael Winterbottom's The Trip to Greece (2020).
- — (September 7, 2020). "Mad about the boy". The Critics. The Current Cinema. The New Yorker. 96 (26): 80–81. Reviews Armando Iannucci's The Personal History of David Copperfield (2019).
- — (December 21, 2020). "Under the influence". The Critics. The Current Cinema. The New Yorker. 96 (41): 84–85. Reviews Thomas Vinterberg's Another Round (2020) and Ryan Murphy's The Prom (2020).
- — (January 4–11, 2021). "Mother Courage". The Critics. The Current Cinema. The New Yorker. 96 (43): 86–87. Reviews Andrei Konchalovsky's Dear Comrades! (2020).
- — (January 25, 2021). "Surveillance". The Current Cinema. The New Yorker. 96 (45): 76–77. Reviews Sam Pollard's MLK/FBI (2020) and Lili Horvát's Preparations to be together for an unknown period of time (2020).
- — (February 15–22, 2021). "Small pleasures". The Current Cinema. The New Yorker. 97 (1): 94–95. Reviews Azazel Jacobs' French Exit (2020) and Mona Fastvold's The World to Come (2020).
- — (March 1, 2021). "O lucky man! Tom Stoppard's charmed and haunted life". The Critics. Books. The New Yorker. 97 (2): 57–62.
- — (March 8, 2021). "Closer". Goings on About Town. Movies. The New Yorker. 97 (3): 8. Reviews Mike Nichols' Closer (2004).
- — (March 22, 2021). "Borderlands". The Critics. The Current Cinema. The New Yorker. 97 (5): 74–75. Reviews Dominic Cooke's The Courier (2020) and Anthony Scott Burns' Come True (2020).
- — (March 29, 2021). "The Merchant of Venice". Goings on About Town. Movies. The New Yorker. 97 (6): 12. Reviews Michael Radford's The Merchant of Venice (2004).
- — (April 26 – May 3, 2021). "Ronin". Goings on About Town. Movies. The New Yorker. 97 (10): 16. Reviews John Frankenheimer's Ronin (1998).
- — (June 21, 2021). "With the flow". The Critics. The Current Cinema. The New Yorker. 97 (17): 70–71. Reviews Jon M. Chu's In the Heights (2021) and Christian Petzold's Undine (2020).
- — (September 13, 2021). "Troubled talk". The Critics. The Current Cinema. The New Yorker. 97 (28): 80–81. Reviews Andreas Fontana's Azor (2021) and Natalie Morales's Language Lessons (2021).
- — (September 20, 2021). "Inside stories". The Critics. The Current Cinema. The New Yorker. 97 (29): 82–83. Reviews Paul Schrader's The Card Counter (2021) and Bill Bentz's The Nowhere Inn (2020).
- — (September 27, 2021). "Better selves". The Critics. The Current Cinema. The New Yorker. 97 (30): 90–91. Reviews Maria Schrader's I'm Your Man (2021) and Michael Showalter's The Eyes of Tammy Faye (2021).
- — (May 30, 2022). "Battle ready". The Critics. The Current Cinema. The New Yorker. 98 (14): 76–77. Reviews Joseph Kosinski's Top Gun: Maverick (2022) and Alex Garland's Men (2022).
- — (September 5, 2022). "What you wish for". The Critics. The Current Cinema. The New Yorker. 98 (27): 66–67. Reviews George Miller's Three Thousand Years of Longing (2022) and Fernando León de Aranoa's The Good Boss (2021).
- — (March 27, 2023). "Sin City". Goings on About Town. Movies. The New Yorker. 99 (6): 12. Reviews Robert Rodriguez and Frank Miller's Sin City (2005).
- — (April 3, 2023). "The Talented Mr. Ripley". Goings on About Town. Movies. The New Yorker. 99 (7): 8. Reviews Anthony Minghella's The Talented Mr. Ripley (1999).
- — (July 3, 2023). "The Selfish Giant". Goings on About Town. Movies. The New Yorker. 99 (19): 10. Reviews Clio Barnard's The Selfish Giant (2013).
