= A Nightmare Wakes =

2020 thriller film

- Poster
- Directed by: Nora Unkel
- Written by: Nora Unkel
- Produced by: Frédéric Fiore; Gabriel Rosenstein; Robert Menzies; Devin Shepherd; Eric Tavitian
- Starring: Alix Wilton Regan; Giullian Yao Gioiello; Philippe Bowgen; Lee Garrett; Claire Glassford; Shannon Spangler; Nicholas Freeland Clark
- Cinematography: Oren Soffer
- Edited by: Scott Schuler
- Music by: Jon Cziner
- Production companies: Logical Pictures; Wild Obscura Films; Zed.Film Productions; The Spitting Image; Eggplant Picture & Sound
- Distributed by: Shudder
- Release dates: October 2, 2020 (Salem Horror Fest); February 4, 2021 (USA)
- Running time: 90 min.
- Country: United States
- Language: English

A Nightmare Wakes is a 2020 American psychological thriller film directed and written by Nora Unkel. The film stars Alix Wilton Regan, Giullian Yao Gioiello, Philippe Bowgen, Lee Garrett and Claire Glassford. It premiered on Shudder on February 4, 2021.

== Plot ==
Mary is a young writer whose story comes to life in horribly vivid hallucinations, causing her to question the relationships she maintains with the people she loves and the reality around her.

== Cast ==
- Alix Wilton Regan as Mary Shelley
- Giullian Yao Gioiello as Percy Shelley
- Philippe Bowgen as Lord Byron
- Lee Garrett as Dr. John Polidori
- Claire Glassford as Claire Clairmont
- Shannon Spangler as Harriet Shelley
- Nicholas Freeland Clark as Party Goer

== Critical reception ==
On the review aggregator website Rotten Tomatoes, 55% of 33 critics' reviews are positive. The website's consensus reads: "A Nightmare Wakes revisits the creation of a classic story from an admirably novel perspective; unfortunately, it never quite lumbers to life."
