= Sofia Kappel =

Swedish actress (born 1998)

- Born: 27 April 1998 (age 28)
- Occupation: Actress
- Years active: 2021–present
- Awards: Guldbagge Award for Best Actress in a Leading Role (2022)

Sofia Kappel (born 27 April 1998) is a Swedish actress. She made her feature film debut in Pleasure (2021), for which she received critical praise and won the Guldbagge Award for Best Actress.

== Life and career ==
She was born on 27 April 1998 and raised in Stockholm. She played bandy for ten years and attended Danderyd Gymnasium. She made no acting experience and was working in the financial sector, prior to making her feature film debut in Pleasure (2021), where she played a Swedish woman trying to become a porn star in Los Angeles. Kappel's performance received critical praise and earned her the Guldbagge Award for Best Actress. She played Jossan in Feed (2022), an influencer-themed horror film. In 2024, she appeared in Happy jävla Pride as Nina, a young lesbian woman who becomes homeless after a break-up with her girlfriend.

== Acting credits ==
=== Film ===
Year	Title	Role	Notes	Ref.
2021	Pleasure	Bella Cherry / Linnéa		
2022	Feed	Jossan		

=== Television ===
Year	Title	Role	Notes	Ref.
2024	Happy jävla Pride	Nina		

== Awards and nominations ==
Year	Award	Category	Work	Result	Ref.
2022	Guldbagge	Best Actress in a Leading Role	Pleasure	Won	
