= Feed (2022 film) =

2022 horror film

- Poster
- Directed by: Johannes Persson
- Starring: Molly Nutley; Joel Lützow; Sofia Kappel; Vincent Grahl
- Release date: 2022
- Running time: 100 minutes
- Country: Sweden
- Language: Swedish
- Budget: 20 million (SEK)

Feed is a Swedish horror film, released to cinemas on 28 October 2022. It is distributed by Nordisk Film. The film won the Audience award at the 2023 Guldbaggegalan.

== Plot ==
Elin follows her influencer boyfriend and his influencer friends to a all expenses paid weekend trip to newly established ”eco camping” on a small island. Before being left on the island for the night the owner tells them about Märit the witch, a woman punished for witchery in the 1600s who wears an iron mask and haunts the area. Soon a night of partying and fun turns into a nightmare for them abandoned on the island.
