= Pearl (drag queen) =

American drag queen (born 1990)

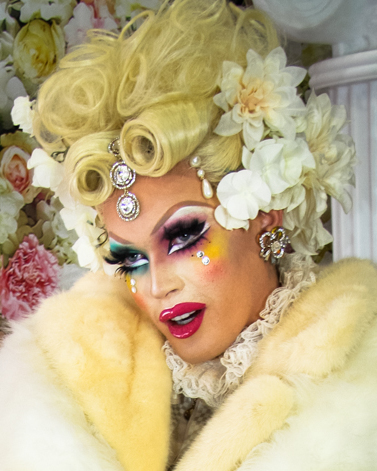
- Pearl at RuPaul's DragCon LA in 2018
- Born: Matthew James Lent; September 11, 1990 (age 36); St. Petersburg, Florida, U.S.
- Other name: Pearl Liaison
- Occupations: Drag queen; record producer
- Years active: 2012–present

Pearl, occasionally known as Pearl Liaison, is the stage name of American drag performer and record producer Matthew James Lent, who came to international attention on the seventh season of RuPaul's Drag Race, finishing joint runner-up.

== Early life ==
Lent grew up in St. Petersburg, Florida with his mother and two sisters. He spent time drawing "rich old ladies with big diamond rings and furs" and female nudes, which eventually morphed into his drag persona. When first beginning her drag career, she was unable to afford anything besides "thrift store lingerie" and "cheap furs"; however, Pearl has stated that she cared more about her makeup and wigs than the quality of her outfits, and that the aesthetics of what she previously illustrated translated easier with her cheaper wardrobe than "fashionable garments".

== Drag career ==
After moving to Chicago, Lent began performing in drag in 2012, alongside Kim Chi and Trixie Mattel, using the stage name Pearl. He first went out in public in drag while wearing a "she-devil" outfit for Halloween alongside Kim Chi. He has described Pearl's persona as a "Stepford wife robot bitch". Lent initially only planned to use drag as a hobby, but quickly began booking gigs at increasing frequency. He later moved to Brooklyn, New York.

In December 2014, after a year and a half of performing in drag, Pearl was announced to be a participant on the seventh season of the Logo TV reality television series RuPaul's Drag Race. She had hired a friend of hers who had produced videos for other Drag Race queens, such as DiDa Ritz, to create her audition video, and received her acceptance call 3–4 weeks after moving to Brooklyn. Despite a slow start to the competition, Pearl rebounded to win two main challenges and eventually became a finalist alongside fellow competitors Ginger Minj and Violet Chachki. In the season finale, Violet Chachki was crowned the winner, leaving Pearl as the runner-up. After the series, Pearl claimed that her lack of enthusiasm towards the show while appearing on it was due to an early negative comment towards her by RuPaul which was off-camera : “Nothing you say matters unless that camera is rolling." As a result, she says she has not been invited back for an All Stars series.

Pearl has been described as the drag mother of Scarlet Envy, who appeared on season 11 of RuPaul's Drag Race. Pearl denied this in an interview in July 2019, describing Scarlet as a good friend of hers.

In mid-2019, she announced the possibility of moving to Hawaii to live with her boyfriend; however, as of 2023, she is located in Phoenix, Arizona.

== Other ventures ==
On June 2, 2015, Lent released the album Pleasure, along with a music video for its first single, "Love Slave". Unlike other albums released by Drag Race alumnae, Pleasure does not feature any vocals from Lent; he instead produced the entire album. The album charted at number eleven on the US Billboard Dance/Electronic Albums chart and number sixteen on the Heatseekers chart.

On June 2, 2015, Lent announced the release of a fragrance, Flazéda, with perfume company Xyrena. In doing so, he became the first Drag Race alumnus member to release a scent. The fragrance started shipping on June 30, 2015.

== Discography ==
Albums

Title	Details	Peak chart positions	
Title	Details	US Dance	US Heat
Pleasure	Released: June 2, 2015; Label: Sidecar Records; Formats: Digital download	11	16

Singles

Title	Year	Album
"Love Slave" (featuring Jaylee Maruk)	2015	Pleasure

Other appearances

Title	Year	Other artist(s)	Album
"Hey Booty"	2015	RuPaul, Miles Davis Moody	RuPaul Presents: CoverGurlz2

== Filmography ==
=== Television ===
Year	Title	Role	Notes	Ref.
2015	RuPaul's Drag Race	Herself (Contestant)	Season 7 - Runner-up	

=== Web series ===
Year	Title	Role	Notes	Ref.
2015	Untucked	Herself	Companion web series to RuPaul's Drag Race	

=== Music videos ===
Title	Year	Director	Ref.
"Hey Booty"	2015	Matthew James Lent	
"Love Slave"	2015	Michael Serrato	

=== Music video appearances ===
Title	Year	Director	Ref.
"Bettie" (Violet Chachki)	2015	Michael Serrato	
"Nerves of Steel" (Erasure)	2020	Brad Hammer	

== See also ==
- LGBT culture in New York City
- List of LGBT people from New York City
- NYC Pride March
