= Swallow (2019 film) =

2019 psychological thriller film by Carlo Mirabella-Davis

- Theatrical release poster
- Directed by: Carlo Mirabella-Davis
- Written by: Carlo Mirabella-Davis
- Produced by: Carole Baraton; Frédéric Fiore; Mollye Asher; Mynette Louie
- Starring: Haley Bennett; Austin Stowell; Elizabeth Marvel; David Rasche; Denis O'Hare
- Cinematography: Katelin Arizmendi
- Edited by: Joe Murphy
- Music by: Nathan Halpern
- Production companies: Charades; Logical Pictures; Stand Alone Productions; Syncopated Films
- Distributed by: IFC Films (United States); UFO Distribution (France)
- Release dates: April 28, 2019 (Tribeca); January 15, 2020 (France); March 6, 2020 (United States)
- Running time: 94 minutes
- Countries: United States; France
- Language: English
- Box office: $274,674

Swallow is a 2019 psychological thriller film written and directed by Carlo Mirabella-Davis and starring Haley Bennett, Austin Stowell, Elizabeth Marvel, David Rasche, and Denis O'Hare. Its plot follows a young woman who, emotionally stifled in her marriage and domestic life, develops an impulse to consume inedible objects.

The film had its world premiere at the Tribeca Film Festival on April 28, 2019. It was released in France on January 15, 2020, by UFO Distribution, and in the United States on March 6, 2020, by IFC Films.

== Plot ==
Hunter Conrad, a young woman from a lower-working-class family, has recently married Richie Conrad, a man from a wealthy family who is set to take over as CEO of his father's Manhattan corporation. This affords Hunter the ability to stay at home in the couple's lavish upstate New York home. Despite this, Hunter finds herself emotionally stifled and isolated in both her marriage and domestic life, while Richie is distant and inconsiderate toward her. For example, at a dinner with Richie's parents to congratulate the young couple on their pregnancy, Hunter is enticed to tell a story, only to be interrupted by her father-in-law zoning out and asking Richie about business. One day while home alone, Hunter develops the impulse to eat a marble. She finds it exhilarating and begins to consume other inedible objects around the house, including thumbtacks, metal figurines, and a battery.

During a routine ultrasound, the sonogram technician notices an anomaly in her abdomen. She is rushed in for emergency surgery to remove a variety of objects trapped in her intestine. Hunter is diagnosed with pica, a psychological disorder that compels individuals to eat inedible objects. Instead of concern and sympathy, Richie responds with anger and contempt. Richie's parents, Katherine and Michael, arrange for her to see a psychiatrist in the city. During therapy, Hunter says she just wants to stop swallowing objects to make Richie happy and that she likes the feel of their textures in her mouth.

Richie hires Luay, a family friend and immigrant from Syria, to monitor Hunter while he is at work. Hunter, feeling smothered, is initially hostile toward Luay, who dismisses her mental illness as resulting from her privileged life. She continues concealing and swallowing objects and, at Richie's birthday party, is upset to learn that he has told his friends about her illness. In therapy, she eventually reveals she was not raised by her biological father and has never met him, though she knows his name, William Irwin, and keeps a picture of him. She was conceived as a result of her mother's rape by this man, though her mother never considered abortion because of her religious convictions. William served time in prison for his crime.

One afternoon, Hunter overhears Richie speaking with her psychiatrist on the phone, and she realizes Richie has bribed the doctor to tell him what was discussed in Hunter's therapy sessions. This sends Hunter into a panic, and she swallows a miniature screwdriver. Luay finds her choking violently and calls 9-1-1. After undergoing surgery to remove the screwdriver, Michael and Katherine arrange to have Hunter committed to a psychiatric hospital for the next seven months until she delivers the baby, threatening that Richie will divorce her if she refuses to consent to hospitalization. Before they can leave for the hospital, Luay, who has warmed to Hunter, allows her to flee into the woods and stages it to appear as though she has escaped.

Hunter hitchhikes to a motel and calls Richie, who begs her to return. She explains she had rushed into their marriage and pregnancy to make him happy. When she refuses to come back, he threatens and insults her. Hunter smashes her cell phone and spends the rest of the night watching television and eating soil from outside. The next day, she hitchhikes to the home of her biological father. At William's house, he is celebrating his birthday with family and friends. He and his wife Lucy assume Hunter is the parent of one of their daughter's friends, but she privately reveals her true identity to William. During an emotional conversation, William professes his shame for raping Hunter's mother. Hunter asks him if he is ashamed of her and whether she is like him, both of which he denies.

Having obtained some closure, Hunter visits a clinic and is prescribed medication to induce an abortion. She takes the pills while eating lunch in a food court and experiences the abortion in a public restroom.

== Cast ==
- Haley Bennett as Hunter Conrad
- Austin Stowell as Richie Conrad
- Elizabeth Marvel as Katherine Conrad
- David Rasche as Michael Conrad
- Denis O'Hare as William Erwin
- Lauren Vélez as Lucy
- Zabryna Guevara as Alice
- Laith Nakli as Luay
- Babak Tafti as Aaron
- Nicole Kang as Bev

== Production ==
In September 2016, it was announced that Carlo Mirabella-Davis would direct the film based on a screenplay that he wrote. He drew inspiration from his grandmother's obsessive-compulsive disorder (OCD) to create the story of a pregnant housewife who develops the disorder pica, which causes her to ingest inedible objects. Mirabella-Davis stated that his grandmother developed various rituals of control due to her unhappy marriage and the increasing sense of powerlessness in her life. She was eventually placed in a mental institution, where she received treatments such as electroshock therapy, insulin shock therapy, and a non-consensual lobotomy. Mirabella-Davis wanted to make a film about his grandmother's experience, but he realized that hand washing, her primary OCD symptom, was not very cinematic. Instead, he chose to focus on pica and explore the attraction that people with this disorder have to ingesting objects.

Mynette Louie and Mollye Asher were slated to produce the film along with Syncopated Films and Standalone Productions. In May 2018, Haley Bennett, Austin Stowell, Elizabeth Marvel, David Rasche and Denis O'Hare joined the cast of the film. Carole Baraton, Frédéric Fiore were also announced as producers under their Charades and Logical Pictures banners, respectively. Joe Wright, Bennett, Constantin Briest, Johann Comte, Pierre Mazars, Eric Tavitian and Sam Bisbee were named executive producers.

=== Filming ===
Principal photography began on April 28, 2018. The film was shot in a glass home in Highland, New York, along the Hudson River, and at a nearby farm. Mirabella-Davis attributes the selection of the home to its Hitchcock-like appearance. He also has compared the home's nearby river to a "mood ring", representing freedom, power and danger, a stark contrast to the powerless life that protagonist Hunter finds herself living.

In a 2020 interview, production designer Erin Magill noted that inspiration for the film's overall aesthetic and strong visual look was taken from films such as Safe and Rosemary's Baby. She was also inspired by famous photographers such as Tina Barney, Philip Lorca-diCorcia and Gregory Crewdson.

== Release ==
Swallow had its world premiere at the Tribeca Film Festival on April 28, 2019, where Bennett received the award for Best Actress. Shortly thereafter, IFC Films acquired American distribution rights. It was released in France on January 15, 2020, by UFO Distribution, and in the United States on March 6, 2020. It tied for the highest-grossing film in the U.S. for the week of April 17, 2020, though earning just $2,490 from a handful of drive-in theaters during the COVID-19 pandemic, with a total of $31,646 in its seven-week run up to that point.

=== Critical reception ===
Swallow received generally positive reviews from film critics. It holds an 87% approval rating on review aggregator website Rotten Tomatoes, based on 143 reviews, with an average of 7.4/10. The site's critical consensus reads, "Swallow's unconventional approach to exploring domestic ennui is elevated by a well-told story and Haley Bennett's powerful leading performance." On Metacritic, the film holds a rating of 65 out of 100, based on 22 critics, indicating "generally favorable reviews".

Justine Smith of RogerEbert.com gave Swallow 3.5 out of 4 stars, and described the film "an uncompromising horror that evokes deeply rooted alienation and dysmorphia" and "a far cry from the 'rah-rah' feminist empowerment stories that end in blood-soaked revenge." She lauds the film for its ability to invert typical horror movie tropes and depict the intimate horror of being a woman fighting for bodily autonomy. Smith also praises the film's director, Carlo Mirabella-Davis, for his ability to create an unsettling and engaging experience, and commends lead actress Haley Bennett for her portrayal of Hunter, noting her ability to convey inner turmoil while maintaining a calm exterior. Smith concludes that Swallow is a powerful and thought-provoking film that ranks among the "best films about the fight for female bodily autonomy in the contemporary era."

Writing for The New York Times, Kristen Yoonsoo Kim praises Haley Bennett's exceptional acting, but finds Swallow's body-horror elements nauseating and the payoff and psychology behind Hunter's actions not illuminating enough. She acknowledges the film's avoidance of pure body-horror sensationalism and its attempt to trace Hunter's need for control to a trauma in her past, but ultimately finds it lacking in its execution, concluding that it falls short in adding anything new to the woman-on-the-verge-of-a-nervous-breakdown genre.

In Katie Rife's review for The AV Club, she describes Swallow as a high-class version of My Strange Addiction. She notes that the film's visuals are impressive and praises lead actress Haley Bennett's performance, which makes the film more than just a "freak show."

Kimber Myers' review for The Los Angeles Times praises the lead actress and the film's feminist themes. Myers compares the film's style and themes to Todd Haynes' works and the melodramas of Douglas Sirk, with its saturated colors, Midcentury furniture, and a story of a woman trying to escape her life. She notes that the film is difficult to watch at times, but that it is "psychologically rich and always feels genuine" despite its stunningly stylized portrayal of the complex protagonist's inner world.

Dissenting opinions included that of critic Barry Hertz of The Globe and Mail, who wrote that "Mirabella-Davis treats Hunter's behaviour with kid gloves — it is a disorder that the film treats as fit for gawking and disgust, not anything close to understanding or empathy."
