= Mark Spiegler =

Pornographic talent agent

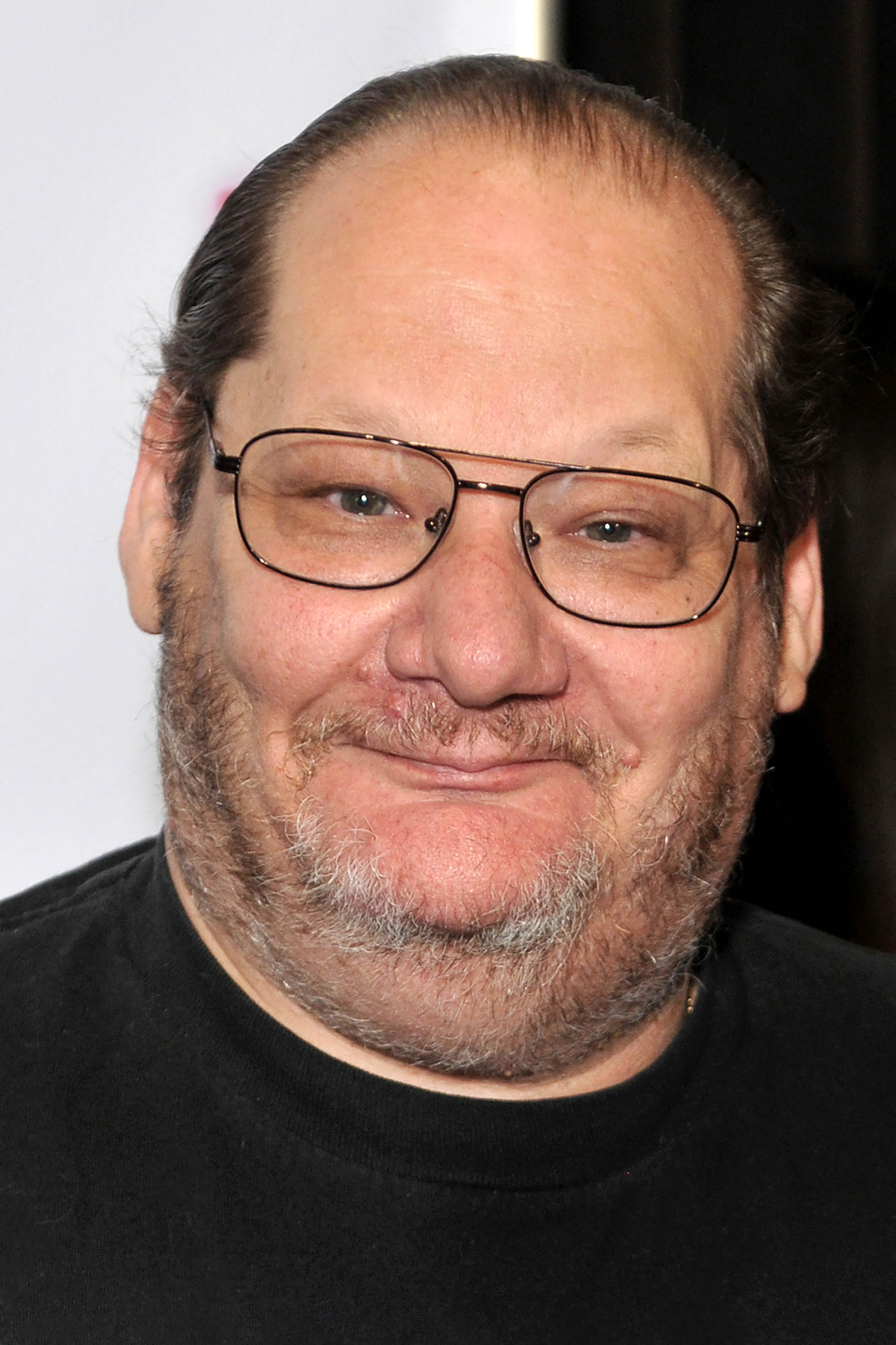
- Spiegler at the XRCO Awards in Hollywood, California on April 25, 2013
- Born: 1958 or 1959 (age 67–68)
- Other name: Shylock
- Occupation: Talent agent
- Website: spieglergirls.com

Mark Spiegler (born 1958/1959) is an American talent agent for pornographic actresses and founder of Spiegler Girls, which is often regarded as being among the adult film industry's top agencies.

Spiegler was inducted into the AVN Hall of Fame in 2012.

== Early life ==
Spiegler was raised in West Hollywood, California and attended Hollywood Professional School and then Hollywood High School. He is Jewish. He graduated from California State University, Northridge with a Bachelor of Arts degree in economics and became a stock trader afterward.

== Career ==
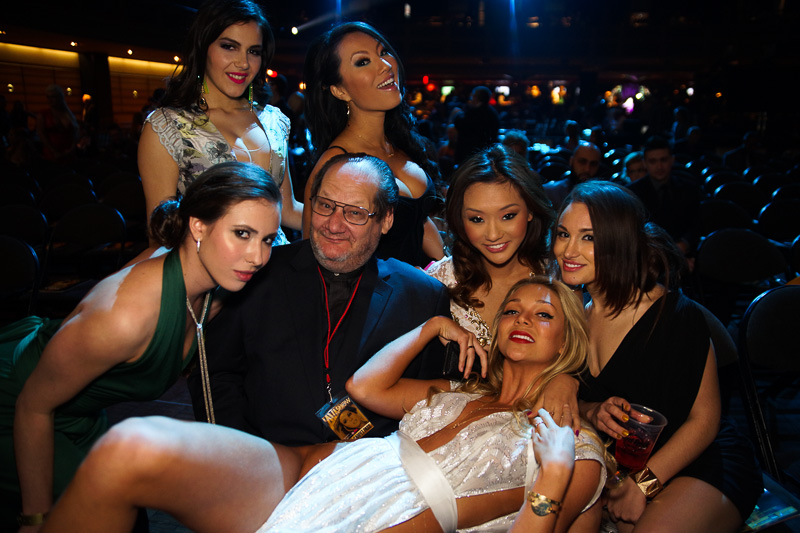
Mark Spiegler (center) with Spiegler Girls (clockwise from top left) Valentina Nappi, Asa Akira, Alina Li, Gabriella Paltrova, Jessie Andrews and Casey Calvert at the 2014 AVN Awards

Spiegler began working in the adult film industry as a production assistant in the 1980s, while in the 1990s he worked as a producer on 96 pornographic films.

Spiegler began working as an agent after French pornographic actress Lisa Crawford asked him to represent her. In 1999, he began working as an agent for Topp Models, but in 2003 he founded his own agency, Spiegler Girls, which is a member of the Licensed Adult Talent Agency Trade Association (LATATA).

Spiegler refers to himself as the "Patron of the Tarts" on his business cards. He has also been referred to as the "Ari Emanuel of porn" by several mainstream media outlets, such as The Hollywood Reporter and The Daily Beast. LA Weekly referred to him as the "Ari Gold of porn".

Spiegler has appeared on The Tyra Banks Show, The Burn with Jeff Ross and the German documentary film 9to5 – Days in Porn. In the 2021 drama film Pleasure, he plays himself.

In February 2009, Spiegler filed a $3 million lawsuit for defamation of character against pornographic film director Skeeter Kerkove. Kerkove had alleged that Spiegler received oral sex from four of his clients (Jayna Oso, Katja Kassin, Melissa Lauren and Katsuni) in exchange for finding them work. All four performers signed declarations stating that the allegations made by Kerkove were false and Spiegler won $85,000 in damages in December 2010.
