= Pleasure Point =

Pleasure Point may refer to:

- Pleasure Point, New South Wales, Australia
- Pleasure Point, California, United States
