= Pleasure (2013 film) =

2013 short film by Ninja Thyberg

Pleasure is a 2013 Swedish short film by Ninja Thyberg. The film tells the story of a girl Marie (played by Jenny Hutton) who agrees to perform a double-anal sex scene in a hard porn video in order to keep her job. The short tells about the darker side of the porn industry.

It won the Canal + Award in the Critics' Week section at the 2013 Cannes Film Festival and was broadcast on Canal + in France. An extended version debuted at the Sundance Film Festival.

Thyberg adapted the short into a feature-length film, released in 2022 by NEON.
