= The Last Year of Darkness =

2023 Chinese documentary film

- CPH:DOX poster
- Directed by: Benjamin Mullinkosson
- Produced by: Sol Ye, Anita Gou, Sam Intili
- Cinematography: Gena Baranov, Yanqiu Fei
- Edited by: Bobby Moser, Jordan Rosenbloom
- Distributed by: MUBI (United States)
- Release date: March 21, 2023 (CPH:DOX)
- Running time: 95 minutes
- Country: China
- Language: Mandarin

The Last Year of Darkness (Chinese: 午夜出走; pinyin: Wǔyè chūzǒu) is a 2023 Chinese documentary film directed by Benjamin Mullinkosson that follows the lives of the queer patrons of a nightclub in Chengdu. The film had its premiere at the 2023 Copenhagen International Documentary Film Festival.

== Premise ==
The film follows the patrons of a now-defunct nightclub named "Funky Town" located in Chengdu. Many of the patrons are queer and use the nightclub as a safe space to interact with other queer people. Interspersed with the scenes of clubbing are scenes from their daily lives, which follow their jobs and their relationships. Among the subjects of the film are Yihao, a drag queen, Kimberly, a guzheng performer with a history of depression, and Gennady, a Russian DJ exploring his sexuality.

== Production ==
The film was directed by American filmmaker Ben Mullinkosson and was filmed in Chengdu. All the subjects of the film were friends with Mullinkosson. The genesis of the film occurred when one of the subjects, Yihao, found out Mullinkosson was a documentary filmmaker, and asked to be filmed. The film was edited from 600 hours of footage shot over 125 nights in five years. Mullinkosson cited the 2009 Canadian film Last Train Home as an influence on The Last Year of Darkness, another documentary made by a North American filmmaker and set in China.

== Reception ==
On review aggregator Rotten Tomatoes, the film holds an approval rating of 100% based on 7 reviews. Peter Bradshaw of The Guardian gave the film 4/5 stars, praising it as "welcoming and reassuring, a neon-detailed night in which nothing matters but youth, beauty and the pleasure of the moment." He also praised the use of David Bowie's "Life on Mars?" in its climax, calling it "a kind of complicated, conditional farewell to hedonism." David Opie of Indiewire gave the film an 'A', praising the film as a "neon-drenched love letter to the Chengdu party scene."

=== Selections ===
- 2023 CPH:DOX (premiere)
- 2023 Beijing Queer Film Festival
- 2023 Camden International Film Festival
- 2023 International Documentary Film Festival Amsterdam
