= Pleasant =

Something pleasant may have associations with happiness, entertainment, enjoyment, ecstasy, or euphoria.

Pleasant may refer to:

- Pleasure, experience that feels good, that involves the enjoyment of something
- Positive affectivity, a human characteristic that describes how much people experience positive affects

Pleasant may also refer to:

- Pleasant, Indiana, an unincorporated community
- Pleasant Township (disambiguation)
- Skulduggery Pleasant, the main character in the eponymous book series by Derek Landy

People with the given name Pleasant:

- Pleasant M. Armstrong (1810–1853), American ship builder
- Pleasant T. Chapman (1854–1931), American politician
- Pleasant Crump (1847–1951), American centenarian
- Pleasant Gehman (21st century), American journalist
- Pleasant Daniel Gold (1833–1920), American publisher and clergyman
- Pleasant Williams Kittrell (1805–1867) American physician, politician, planter
- Pleasant Moorman Miller (died 1849), American politician
- Pleasant Porter (1840–1907), American Indian statesman
- Pleasant Rowland (born circa 1941), American educator, writer, and entrepreneur
- Pleasant Tackitt (1803–1886), American Christian missionary
- Pleasant B. Tully (1829–1897), American politician
- Robert Pleasant Trippe (1819–1900), American politician
- Thomas Pleasant Dockery (1833–1898), Confederate Army general

People with the surname Pleasant:

- Anthony Pleasant (born 1968), American football player
- Frank Mount Pleasant (1884-1937), American track and field athlete
- Frank Pleasant (21st century), American football coach
- Mary Ellen Pleasant (died 1904), American abolitionist
- Ray Pleasant (1928-2022), American politician
- Reggie Pleasant (born 1962), American football player
- Ruffin Pleasant (1871-1937), American politician
- Wally Pleasant (21st century), American musician
