= Pleasure (Pearl album) =

2015 studio album by Pearl

Studio album by Pearl
- Length: 65:12
- Label: Sidecar
- Producer: Matthew Lent

Pleasure is the debut studio album by American drag queen Matthew Lent, released under his character pseudonym Pearl. The album was released on June 2, 2015, through Sidecar Records. As opposed to other albums released by RuPaul's Drag Race alumni, Lent provides little-to-no vocals for the project, and instead produced the entire album.

== Singles ==
On June 2, 2015, the same day as the album was released, "Love Slave" was released as the first single from Pleasure. The single features vocals from Jaylee Maruk. The music video for "Love Slave" was released June 1, 2015, a day before the single and albums release. The single received negative reviews, with Pitchfork Media naming the song as the third worst song by a RuPaul's Drag Race contestant ever.

== Commercial performance ==
Pleasure attained moderate success in the US on Billboard charts. For the week of June 20, 2015, the album debuted at number eleven on the Dance/Electronic Albums chart, and sixteen on the Heatseekers Albums chart.

== Track listing ==
Pleasure
No.	Title	Writer(s)	Length
1.	"Love Slave" (featuring Jaylee Maruk)	Matthew Lent; Jaylee Maruk	4:25
2.	"Die with Me"	Lent	5:16
3.	"Flow So Cold"	Lent	5:00
4.	"Hustler"	Lent	2:27
5.	"Botoxicated"	Lent	5:03
6.	"Pervert"	Lent	3:13
7.	"Bang Bang (All Night)"	Lent	4:29
8.	"Take Off"	Lent	4:42
9.	"God Is Crazy"	Lent	3:27
10.	"Fake Plastic Love" (featuring Rose Wilder)	Lent; Rose Wilder	2:51
11.	"That's F****d Up"	Lent	5:40
12.	"Mission to Mars"	Lent	4:27
13.	"Kick Back"	Lent	4:52
14.	"The Club Goes Pop" (featuring Xander Rushie)	Lent; Xander Rushie	4:43
15.	"Dynamite"	Lent	4:37
Total length:			65:12

== Charts ==
Chart performance for Pleasure
Chart (2015)	Peak position
US Dance/Electronic Albums (Billboard)	11
US Heatseekers Albums (Billboard)	16
