= Pleasure (go-go band) =

Pleasure was the first all-female go-go band, based in the Washington D.C. area.

== History ==
Pleasure featured all-female musicians from the D.C. area, who were in (or recently graduated from) high school, when the band began in the late 1980s. The group was known as "D.C.'s only all-girl go-go band". Michelle Peterson was lead singer/rapper, though other members also provided vocals, Claudia Malcolm played keyboards and Genny Cruz played guitar. Charlie Fenwick was an early manager and the group released their first PA tape in 1989, called Party Tape-Boom Box Edition. Later, after Peterson and others left the band, Liza Figueroa Kravinsky played keyboards for Pleasure.

Some members of Pleasure were chosen to back Salt-n-Pepa as their band, as the trio explained on an appearance on the Arsenio Hall Show in late 1990/early 1991, which contributed to opening up the reputation of go-go to a national audience.

=== Founding ===
Pleasure was founded in 1988 and Fenwick helped organize them. They played many of their early gigs with another group managed by Fenwick called Hot, Cold, Sweat. Lead vocalist Michelle Peterson cited Slick Rick as an early influence on her style.

== Members ==
- Melissa Matthews- vocals/percussion
- Michelle Peterson - vocals
- Natarsha "Little Boogie" Proctor - congas
- Claudia Malcolm - keyboards
- Lashawn "Shawney" Dandy - drums
- Liza Figueroa Kravinsky - keyboards
- Genny "Jam" Cruz - guitars
