= Pleasure Island =

Pleasure Island may refer to:

== Amusement parks ==
- Pleasure Island (Walt Disney World), Orlando, Florida, U.S., closed 2008
- Pleasure Island (Massachusetts amusement park), U.S., closed 1969
- Pleasure Island (Muskegon, Michigan water park), U.S., closed 1991
- Pleasure Island Family Theme Park, in North East Lincolnshire, England, closed 2016

== Other uses ==
- Pleasure Island (North Carolina), U.S., a coastal barrier island
- Pleasure Island (Pinocchio), a fictional location

== See also ==
- The Girls of Pleasure Island, a 1953 film
- Nauru, formerly known as Pleasant Island
