= Acid (2023 film) =

2023 fantasy drama film

- French: Acide
- Directed by: Just Philippot
- Written by: Yacine Badday; Just Philippot
- Based on: Acid by Just Philippot
- Produced by: Yves Darondeau; Emmanuel Priou; Clément Renouvin; Ardavan Safaee
- Starring: Guillaume Canet; Laetitia Dosch; Patience Munchenbach
- Cinematography: Pierre Dejon
- Edited by: Pierre Deschamps
- Music by: Robin Coudert
- Production companies: Bonne Pioche Cinéma; Pathé Films; France 3 Cinéma; Caneo Films; Umedia; Logical Content Ventures
- Distributed by: Pathé
- Release dates: 21 May 2023 (Cannes); 20 September 2023 (France)
- Running time: 99 minutes
- Countries: France; Belgium
- Language: French
- Box office: $2.5 million

Acid (French: Acide; released in the Philippines as Acid Rain) is a 2023 French-language fantasy drama film directed by Just Philippot from a screenplay by Philippot and Yacine Badday. The film is a co-production between France and Belgium. It is an expansion of Philippot's 2018 short film of the same name.

The film premiered at the 76th Cannes Film Festival on 21 May 2023. It was released in France on 20 September 2023.

== Synopsis ==
During a heat wave, strange clouds start pouring down acid rain, wreaking devastation and panic throughout France. In a world teetering on the edge, a girl and her divorced parents must join forces to confront and try to escape this climate catastrophe.

== Cast ==
- Guillaume Canet as Michal
- Laetitia Dosch as Elise
- Patience Munchenbach as Selma
- Marie Jung as Deborah
- Martin Verset as William

== Production ==
=== Development ===
Acid is a feature-length expansion of Just Philippot's short film of the same name. which was released in 2018. Philippot developed Acid in parallel with his debut feature The Swarm (La Nuée), both through the company Bonne Pioche Cinéma. He wrote the screenplay with Yacine Badday.

Acid was produced Yves Darondeau, Emmanuel Priou and Clément Renouvin for Bonne Pioche Cinéma and by Ardavan Safaee for Pathé Films. It was co-produced by France 3 Cinéma, Guillaume Canet's Caneo Films, Belgium's Umedia, and Logical Content Ventures.

=== Filming ===
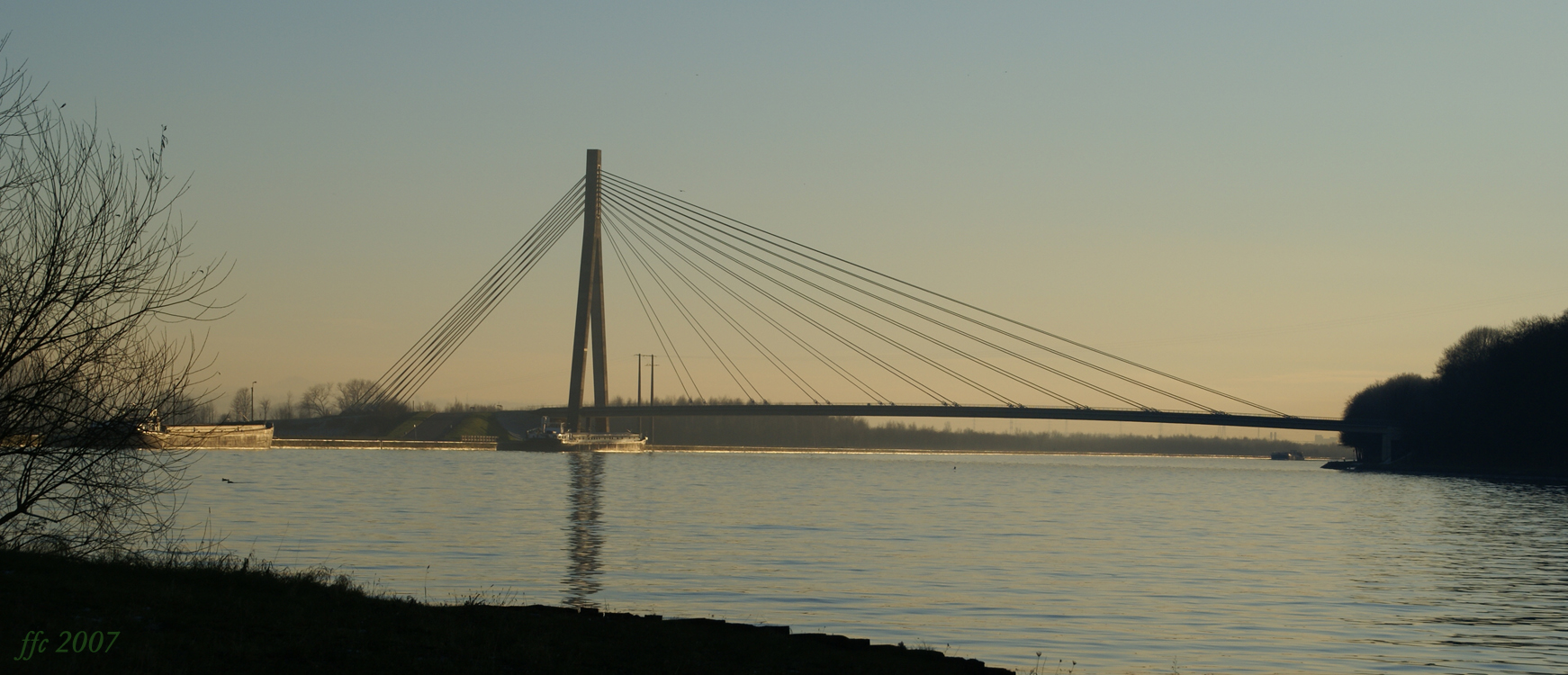
Pont de Lanaye

Principal photography began on 7 March 2022, under the working title Eau-Forte. Between 24 March and 7 April 2022, filming took place in Pecqueuse, Essonne.

Filming also took place in Belgium. Filming took place in Visé between 11 and 26 April 2022, with the Pont de Lanaye closed to facilitate the production. Filming also took place in fort d'Emines, Namur Province, and in Braine-le-Comte, Hainaut Province, including in the Bois de la Houssière on 26 and 27 April 2022. Filming concluded in the middle of the night of 10 May 2022.

=== Music ===
The music for the film was composed by Robin Coudert.

== Release ==
The film was selected to be screened out of competition in the Midnights Screenings section at the 76th Cannes Film Festival, where it had its world premiere on 21 May 2023.

The film was theatrically released in France on 20 September 2023 by Pathé. In the Philippines, the film was released by Pioneer Films as Acid Rain on 17 January 2024.

== Reception ==
=== Critical response ===
On AlloCiné, the film received an average rating of 3.2 out of 5 stars, based on 36 reviews from French critics.

Reviewing the film following its Cannes premiere, Cécile Mury of Télérama praised "a disaster film that haunts with its contemporary realism, in which Guillaume Canet delivers an astonishing performance full of tension". Philippe Guedj of Le Point praised the director who "happily napalms the clichés of the Emmerich genre and maintains until the very end the mark of a film oozing anger". Première included Acid on its "Top 10" list of all films screened at Cannes in May 2023, and later, following its theatrical release, praised the feature: "A grand introspective spectacle that is constantly embodied in movement". L'Écran fantastique devoted its September cover to the film: "Keeping us constantly on our toes, Acid is a real success which, for once, honours our national cinema". Also, the editors of Mad Movies hailed a "gruelling race against time that skilfully combines its socio-climatic themes with its approach to horror", as well as a "mixture of social fantasy that is a clear improvement on The Swarm". In a review by Yal Sadat, Cahiers du cinéma praised the film's inventiveness as a cross between horror and family drama, "inventing a pessimistic, coldly rational (French, in short) counterpoint to the "green" blockbusters bent on the promise of a happy ending".

Among foreign critics, Tim Grierson of Screen International recognized the film's mélange of genres: "Philippot combines aspects of the disaster film and the domestic drama, approaching each genre with understatement to deliver a modest study of personal and societal upheaval – and refusing to offer tidy resolutions on either front." Martyn Conterio of The London Economic lamented the film's unsatisfying conclusion and a lack of budget for grand special effects, but praised the execution of its dread and suspense, as well as the "spiky" personality of Canet's character, which contribute to "excellent interpersonal drama and scenes of high tension".

=== Accolades ===
Award	Date of ceremony	Category	Recipient(s)	Result	Ref.
César Awards	23 February 2024	Best Visual Effects	Thomas Duval	Nominated	
