= Logical Pictures Group =

French film production and financing company

- Type: Private
- Industry: Film and television
- Founded: 2016
- Founders: Frédéric Fiore; Yannick Bossenmeyer
- Key people: Frédéric Fiore (president); Yannick Bossenmeyer (COO)
- Products: Motion pictures; Television programs
- Services: Film and television production; Film and television financing; Film and television distribution
- Divisions: Production; Distribution (France); International sales Technology
- Subsidiaries: Blockframes; Black Mic Mac; Logical Content Ventures; Logical Pictures International; Loveboat; The Joker Films

Logical Pictures Group is a French independent media company founded in 2016 by Frédéric Fiore and Yannick Bossenmeyer. The group activities include operations in film and television including financing, production, sales, distribution and technology.

The group's portfolio has included: Bong Joon-ho's Parasite, distributed in France by The Jokers Films; as well as Emilia Pérez, Limonov: The Ballad and Parthenope, which competed for the Palme d'Or at the 2024 Cannes Film Festival, and The Count of Monte Cristo, which was selected Out of Competition at the same festival.

== History ==
Logical Pictures Group was founded in 2016 by Frédéric Fiore and Yannick Bossenmeyer. The company aimed to make English language elevated genre pictures, by emerging European directors. Its focus also included developing feature films and television series in-house, as well as providing gap financing for third-party projects from the United States, the United Kingdom and Europe.

In February 2017, Logical Pictures raised €20 million to finance a slate of feature films over four years. The financing was intended to support 30 productions, comprising approximately 20 third-party projects and 10 in-house productions. Its third-party slate included Coralie Fargeat's thriller Revenge and Pascal Laugier’s horror thriller Incident in a Ghost Land.

In September 2019, Logical Pictures partnered with Los Angeles-based XYZ Films to handle North American sales and executive produce a selected number of films produced or financed by Logical Pictures. The partnership included the horror film The Deep House, directed by Julien Maury and Alexandre Bustillo.

In January 2023, Logical Pictures entered into a three-year co-production and co-financing partnership with Pathé. Under the agreement, its financing branch, the fund Logical Content Ventures was to participate in financing all films produced or acquired by Pathé from 2022 to 2024. Dany Boon's Life for Real, Just Philippot's Acid, Kirill Serebrennikov's Limonov: The Ballad of Eddie and Matteo Garrone's Io Capitano were among various films to benefit from the deal.

In 2024, Logical Pictures expanded its activities into African markets. The venture was to be run by Frédéric Fiore and Pape Boye, among others. Its activities were structured around financing, production and distribution. The Logical African Stories fund was to invest in content, production and distribution companies, physical facilities, and third-party projects. A production arm was to develop original films and television series and provide production services for in-house and third-party productions, while the group planned distribution activities through the aggregation of television and SVOD rights for African buyers.

Logical Pictures had previously backed the launch of Black Mic Mac, a production company founded by Papa Boye to champion African and Middle Eastern talents, which laid its groundwork for expansion into Africa.

== Expansion ==
=== Distribution ===
==== The Jokers Films ====
In May 2018, Logical Pictures acquired a minority stake in French distributor The Jokers Films, founded by Manuel Chiche. According to its president Frédéric Fiore, the investment was part of Logical Pictures' strategy to build relationships with distributors across Europe.

In May 2022, Logical Pictures acquired French distribution company The Jokers Films and integrated the company within it. Manuel Chiche, who headed The Jokers Films, became a partner in Logical Pictures.

Pulsar Content / Logical Pictures International

In September 2019, Logical Pictures launched Pulsar Content, an international film sales company, in partnership with filmmaker Nicolas Winding Refn.

In January 2026, it was announced that Logical Pictures Group restructured its international sales arm, introducing Logical Pictures International (LPI) to control Pulsar Content. According to its president Fiore, the goal of LPI was to develop "a more synergistic approach with the group's other activities, in particular distribution in France". Andrei Kamarowsky, formerly director of international sales at HanWay Films, was appointed head of international at LPI.

=== Financing/Investment funds ===
In December 2020, it was announced Logical Pictures was set to launch a film and television investment fund capped at €100 million. The fund was described as an open-ended investment fund, with its portfolio to be valued annually based on the revenues generated by each title. Investors were expected to receive annual returns of 4% to 6%.

In September 2023, it was reported that the European Commission and European Investment Fund's MediaInvest initiative made its first equity investment of up to €25 million to Logical Content Ventures (LCV), the investment fund managed by Logical Pictures.

In January 2025, Logical Pictures secured €40 million for its Logical Content Ventures (LCV) film fund, with half of the amount coming from the FEI. According to its founder Frédéric Fiore, apart from the FEI, most of the fund's subscriptions came from family offices and entrepreneurs.

=== Production ===
==== The Jokers Lab ====
During its acquisition of The Jokers Films in 2022, it was reported that The Jokers Films will launch a production division dedicated to documentary features called The Jokers Lab.

==== Loveboat ====
Logical Pictures is associated with Loveboat, a production company founded in 2021 by Jeff Baron, Greg Panteix, Nicolas Winding Refn and Frédéric Fiore. Operating in Los Angeles and Paris, Loveboat produces projects across advertising, entertainment and fiction.

=== Technology ===
==== Cascade8 ====
In February 2022, Logical Pictures announced the launch of Cascade8, a technology subsidiary that develops blockchain and software applications for the entertainment industry. The previous year, it was reported that Cascade8 had released its first software applications, Archipel Market, a film market platform, and Archipel Content, a content market.

In May 2024, Cascade8 partnered with Freeway Entertainment to develop and commercialise Blockframes, a revenue-management platform for the film and television industry. The partnership was announced during the Cannes Film Festival.

==== Blockframes ====
In 2018, it was announced Logical Pictures launched Blockframes, a blockchain-based platform intended to improve chain of title rights management, contract security and revenue distribution. French distributor Bac Films became the first user of the platform with the animated feature Terra Willy.

In an interview with Cineuropa at Cannes 2025, the company's co-CEO Yannick Bossenmeyer spoke about Blockframes partnership with Freeway Entertainment, which was previously announced in Cannes 2024. She stated that Blockframes had introduced AI Magic Import, a tool that uses artificial intelligence to interpret film revenue contracts and automatically generate revenue waterfalls.
