= Pleasure (2021 film) =

2021 film by Ninja Thyberg

- Theatrical release poster
- Directed by: Ninja Thyberg
- Written by: Ninja Thyberg; Peter Modestij
- Based on: Pleasure by Ninja Thyberg
- Produced by: Erik Hemmendorff; Eliza Jones; Markus Waltå
- Starring: Sofia Kappel
- Cinematography: Sophie Winqvist Loggins
- Edited by: Amalie Westerlin Tjellesen; Olivia Neergaard-Holm
- Music by: Karl Frid
- Production companies: Plattform Produktion; Film i Väst; Sveriges Television; Lemming Film; Grand Slam Film; Logical Pictures
- Distributed by: SF Studios (Sweden); The Jokers (France); Gusto Entertainment (Netherlands)
- Release dates: 1 February 2021 (Sundance); 8 October 2021 (Sweden); 20 October 2021 (France); 4 November 2021 (Netherlands)
- Running time: 105 minutes
- Countries: France; Sweden; Netherlands
- Languages: English; Swedish
- Box office: $393,824

Pleasure is a 2021 drama film written and directed by Ninja Thyberg in her feature directorial debut, based on her 2013 short film. It stars Sofia Kappel, Revika Anne Reustle, Evelyn Claire, Chris Cock, Dana DeArmond and Kendra Spade. The film follows a young woman from a small Swedish town who moves to Los Angeles to become a porn star.

Pleasure was selected for the 2020 Cannes Film Festival before premiering at the 2021 Sundance Film Festival on 1 February 2021 in the World Cinema Dramatic Competition section.

== Plot ==
19-year-old Linnéa, working under the stage name "Bella Cherry", is a girl from a small town in Sweden who travels to Los Angeles in the hopes of becoming a famous porn star. Under the guidance of her manager, she begins to navigate the challenging world of the porn industry, determined to achieve more significant roles and video views by pushing herself beyond personal boundaries and limits. Bella shares a house with a group of other young aspiring actresses, and though she is standoffish and private at first, she eventually bonds with one of her housemates, Joy, who supports Bella and helps her build her brand. At a party, the girls spot Mark Spiegler, one of the most successful and demanding agents in the porn industry; he is joined by Ava, one of the biggest names in the local porn scene. Bella starts a conversation with Ava, but does not get past pleasantries. Joy tries to flirt with a famous male actor, Caesar, but when he rejects her, she retaliates by pushing him into the pool.

Bella works on several shoots, including a BDSM scene with a female director who encourages Bella in positive, healthy ways, enforcing safety and consent on the set. However, Bella, determined to push herself further, requests hardcore scenes from her manager. While filming a rape scene with two male actors, she becomes overwhelmed and breaks down, repeatedly interrupting filming. Her co-stars and the director are initially supportive, but they quickly grow hostile and impatient when she struggles to finish the scene. Bella reluctantly agrees to complete the shoot and later confronts her manager, who reminds her that she requested harder material. Upset, Bella fires him as her manager.

Now working independently, Bella attempts to acquire Spiegler as her new manager, but he turns her down, citing her weak social media following and insisting that he only accepts actresses willing to do extreme scenes. In order to prove herself, Bella participates in an unpaid interracial threesome, in which she engages in double-anal penetration (which Bella later points out has never been done before in the industry) despite having never previously shot an anal sex scene, thus boosting her following considerably. Spiegler is impressed and agrees to hire Bella.

As a way to repay her friend, Bella requests that Joy be part of her next scene. Joy is initially thrilled, but hesitates when the lead actor withdraws at the last minute and is replaced by Caesar. Bella implores Joy to go through with the shoot, but soon observes Caesar harassing Joy off-camera. During the scene, which involves degradation and humiliation, Caesar begins to legitimately abuse Joy, who stops the scene in anger. Joy insists to the director that Caesar is harming her, but when she asks Bella to confirm Caesar's earlier harassment, Bella, worried about her reputation, balks. Furious, Joy upbraids Bella for her betrayal and storms off the set.

Bella is given a chance to film a scene with Ava, but Ava humiliates her when she refuses to perform oral sex on Bella, claiming she has a yeast infection. The scene is changed so that Bella will penetrate Ava with a strap-on, but Bella quickly lets her anger and frustration take over, acting violently and aggressively towards Ava without warning or consent, just as many of her male co-stars and directors did to her since her arrival. When Bella tries to apologize to Ava later en route to a party, Ava nonchalantly dismisses her as if nothing had bothered her, which disturbs Bella. Bella is further disillusioned when she spots her former housemates at the party, all of whom are enjoying themselves—unlike Bella, who is now essentially restricted to the VIP area. On the ride back from the party, Bella abruptly asks the car to stop so she can exit.

== Cast ==
- Sofia Kappel as Bella Cherry / Linnéa
- Revika Anne Reustle as Joy
- Evelyn Claire as Ava Rhoades
- Chris Cock as Bear
- Dana DeArmond as Ashley
- Kendra Spade as Kimberly
- Jason Toler as Mike
- Mark Spiegler as himself
- Lance Hart as Caesar
- John Strong as Brian
- Aiden Starr as herself
- Axel Braun as himself
- Bill Bailey as Adam
- Michael Omelko as Jules
- Chanel Preston as herself
- Casey Calvert as herself
- Xander Corvus as Keith
- Steve Holmes as Christian
- Alice Grey as Aliah
- Abella Danger as herself
- Gina Valentina as herself

== Release ==
Pleasure was selected for the 2020 Cannes Film Festival before premiering at the 2021 Sundance Film Festival on 1 February. On 8 February 2021, A24 acquired U.S. distribution rights to the film. However, on 7 October 2021, it was announced that Neon had acquired U.S. distribution rights to the film, reportedly due to conflicts over A24's plans to release an edited, R-rated theatrical cut in addition to an uncensored version; Neon stated it would not mandate any alternate edit. The film was screened at the 2021 AFI Fest in Los Angeles on 13 November. The film was given a limited theatrical release in the United States on 13 May 2022.

The film was released in Sweden on 8 October 2021 by SF Studios, in France on 20 October 2021 by The Jokers, and in the Netherlands on 4 November 2021 by Gusto Entertainment.

== Reception ==
On the review aggregator website Rotten Tomatoes, 88% of 123 critics' reviews are positive, with an average rating of 7.3/10. The website's consensus reads: "Provocative on more than one level, Pleasure peels back the curtain on unsavory aspects of the adult film industry, with Sofia Kappel's powerful performance leading the way." Metacritic, which uses a weighted average, assigned the film a score of 75 out of 100, based on 24 critics, indicating "generally favorable" reviews. At the 57th Guldbagge Awards, the film received seven nominations, including Best Film and Best Director for Thyberg, and won three, including Best Actress for Kappel. Other awards nominations the film has received include the 2021 British Independent Film Award for Best International Independent Film as well as Best Director for Thyberg and Best Supporting Female for Reustle at the 37th Independent Spirit Awards.

== Comments from the cast ==
After the film's release, actors Lance Hart and Axel Braun both tweeted critically of the film, saying they felt "duped" into participating and that the film was "a cheap shot making us look bad". Since then, however, Braun has expressed support for the film and was in attendance for its U.S. premiere. Actress Evelyn Claire defended the film in an interview with adult industry news outlet XBIZ, arguing that it highlights aspects of the industry that need to change. She suggested that some of the negative reactions to the film stemmed from a lack of understanding caused by gender and generational issues. Claire also urged viewers to see the film from a female perspective and to recognize that some of the negative experiences portrayed in it are based on real stories.
