= Azor (film) =

2021 drama film

- Theatrical release poster
- Directed by: Andreas Fontana
- Screenplay by: Andreas Fontana; Mariano Llinás
- Produced by: Eugenia Mumenthaler; David Epiney; Violeta Bava; Rosa Martínez Rivero; Nicolas Brevière
- Starring: Fabrizio Rongione; Stephanie Cléau
- Production companies: Alina Film; Ruda Cine; Local Films
- Distributed by: Mubi
- Release date: March 2021 (Berlin)
- Countries: Argentina; France; Switzerland
- Languages: Spanish; French; English
- Box office: $74,701

Azor is a 2021 drama film directed by Andreas Fontana from a screenplay written by Fontana and Mariano Llinás. The film stars Fabrizio Rongione and Stephanie Cléau.

The film had its worldwide premiere in 2021 at the 71st Berlin International Film Festival in the Encounters section.

== Plot ==
The film takes place in Argentina in the early 1980s, during the military dictatorship. Yvan de Wiel, a Swiss banker, visits Argentina with his wife Inês, to reassure his clients after the disappearance of his business partner René Keys.

== Cast ==
The cast includes:

- Fabrizio Rongione as Yvan
- Stephanie Cléau as Inés
- Elli Medeiros as Magdalena Padel Camon
- Alexandre Trocki as Frydmer
- Gilles Privat as Lombier
- Juan Pablo Geretto as Dekerman
- Carmen Iriondo as Viuda
- Yvain Juillard as Lombier
- Pablo Torre Nilson as Tatoski
- Juan Trench as Padel Camon

== Production ==
Paul Courlet provided the music.

== Release ==
Rights to Azor in the US, UK, Ireland, Italy, India, and Turkey were purchased by streaming platform Mubi following its premiere at the Berlin International Film Festival.

== Reception ==
On the review aggregator website Rotten Tomatoes, 100% of 46 critics' reviews are positive, with an average rating of 8.1/10. The website's consensus reads: "An uncommonly patient thriller, Azor elegantly slips the viewer into its cool grasp and never lets go." On Metacritic, the film has a weighted average score of 88 out of 100, based on 16 critics, indicating "universal acclaim".
