= Andreas Fontana =

Swiss film director and writer

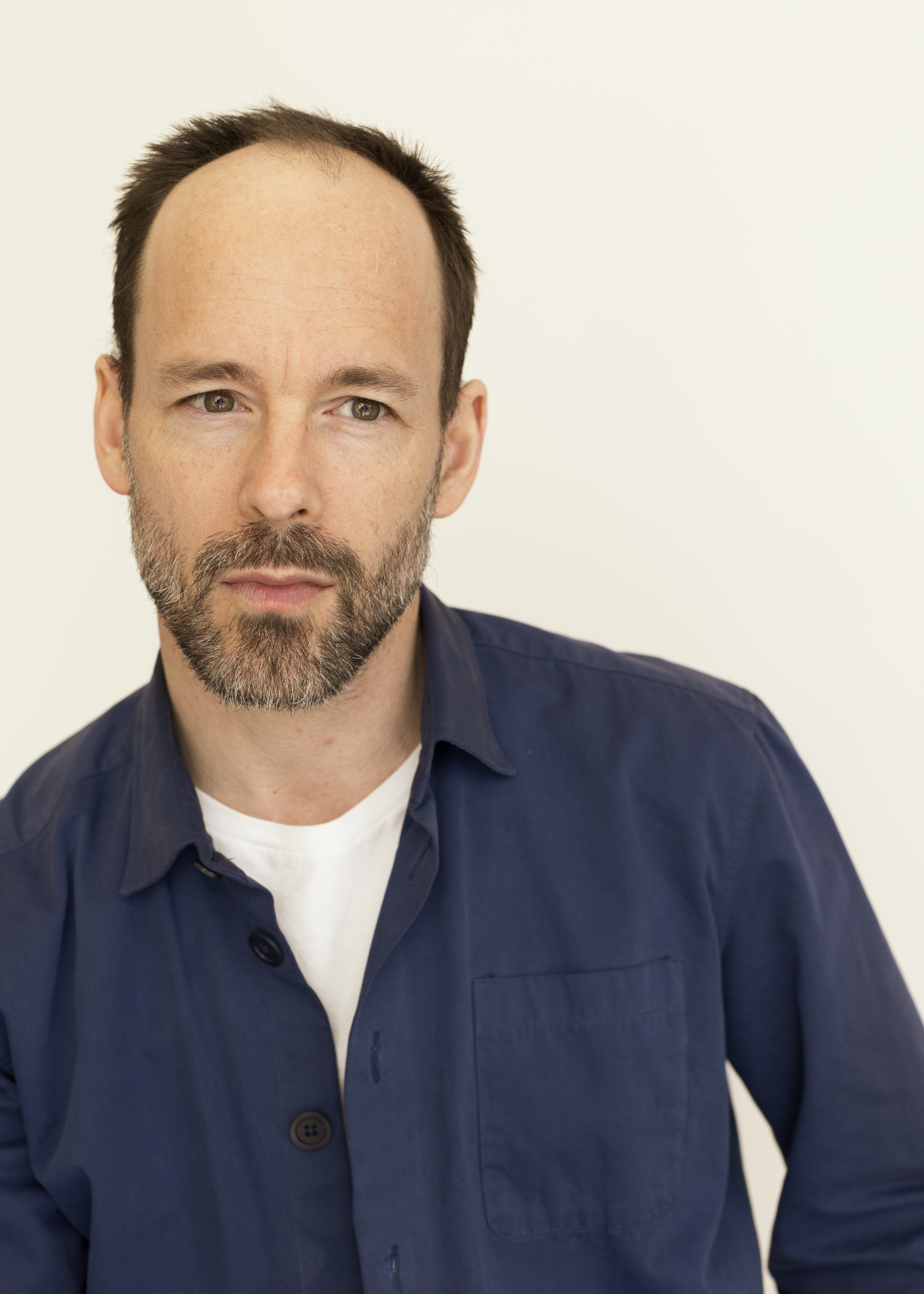
- Born: 1982; Geneva, Switzerland
- Occupations: Director; writer
- Years active: 2009 – present

Andreas Fontana is a Swiss film director and writer. He is best known for his debut feature film Azor.

== Life and career ==
Fontana was born in Geneva. He completed his MA in Comparative Literature at the University of Geneva. In 2009, he directed his first short film Cotonov Vanished, won the First Steps prize at the 2010 Visions du Réel in Nyon. Later in 2010, he graduated with a MA in film production at the École cantonale d'art de Lausanne (ÉCAL) in Lausanne and HEAD in Geneva.

Fontana's debut feature film Azor, starring Fabrizio Rongione, Stephanie Cléau and Elli Medeiros, premiered worldwide at the 71st Berlin International Film Festival. He also won the Emerging Swiss Talent Award at the Zurich Film Festival in 2021.

== Selected filmography ==
Year	Title	Director	Writer	Note
2009	Cotonov Vanished	Yes	Yes	Short film
2011	Dans Nos Campagnes	Yes	Yes	Documentary
2015	Pedro M, 1981	Yes	Yes	Documentary
2021	Azor	Yes	Yes	Feature film

== Awards and nominations ==
Year	Result	Award	Category	Work	Ref.
2010	Won	Visions du Réel	First Steps prize	Cotonov Vanished	
2016	Nominated	Swiss Film Award	Best Short Film	Pedro M, 1981	
2021	Won	Zurich Film Festival	Emerging Swiss Talent Award	Azor	
2021	Nominated	Zurich Film Festival	Best Film	Azor	
2021	Nominated	Taipei Film Festival	International New Talent Competition	Azor	
2021	Nominated	Stockholm International Film Festival	Best Film	Azor	
2021	Nominated	San Sebastián International Film Festival	Horizons Award	Azor	
2021	Nominated	Reykjavík International Film Festival	New Visions	Azor	
2021	Nominated	BFI London Film Festival	First Feature Award	Azor	
2021	Nominated	Jerusalem Film Festival	Best International Debut	Azor	
2021	Nominated	Berlin International Film Festival	Encounters Award	Azor	
2021	Nominated	Gotham Awards	Best International Feature	Azor	
