= Ninja Thyberg =

Swedish film director

- Born: 12 October 1984
- Occupation: Film director

Ninja Maria Thyberg (Swedish: [ˈnǐːnja ˈtŷːbærj]; born October 12, 1984) is a Swedish filmmaker. Since 2010, she has produced a number of short films, often around themes such as sexuality, power and group dynamics.

2015's Girls & Boys is loosely inspired by the feminist book satire Egalia's Daughters. Her 2013 short film Pleasure and the 2021 feature film of the same name are fictional but realistic stories that describe pornography from new perspectives.
