= 19th Lumière Awards =

2014 French film awards ceremony

- Date: 20 January 2014
- Site: Espace Pierre Cardin, Paris, France
- Hosted by: Estelle Martin and Patrick Fabre

Highlights
- Best Film: Blue Is the Warmest Colour
- Best Director: Abdellatif Kechiche
- Best Actor: Guillaume Gallienne
- Best Actress: Léa Seydoux
- Most awards: Blue Is the Warmest Colour (4)
- Most nominations: The French Minister (6)

Television coverage
- Network: TV5Monde

The 19th Lumière Awards ceremony, presented by the Académie des Lumières, was held on 20 January 2014, at the Espace Pierre Cardin in Paris. The ceremony was chaired by actress Carole Bouquet. Television journalist Estelle Martin and director Patrick Fabre were the hosts for the night. Blue Is the Warmest Colour won four awards including Best Film. Other winners included Me, Myself and Mum, The French Minister, Venus in Fur, Grand Central, Horses of God and The Young and Prodigious T.S. Spivet.

== Winners and nominees ==
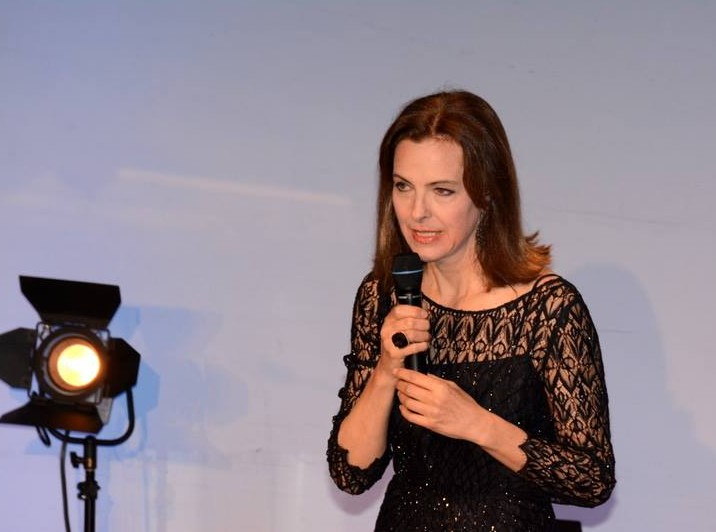
Carole Bouquet, President of the ceremony.

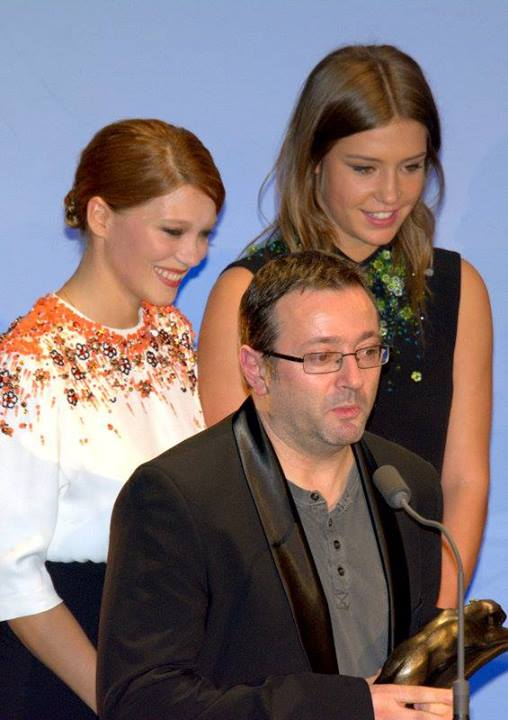
Blue Is the Warmest Colour won the Lumière Award for Best Film.

Winners are listed first and highlighted in bold.

Best Film	Best Director
**Blue Is the Warmest Colour**: Mood Indigo; The French Minister; Renoir; Grand Central; 9 Month Stretch	**Abdellatif Kechiche — Blue Is the Warmest Colour**: Bertrand Tavernier — The French Minister; Albert Dupontel — 9 Month Stretch; Gilles Bourdos — Renoir; Michel Gondry — Mood Indigo; Rebecca Zlotowski — Grand Central
Best Actor	Best Actress
**Guillaume Gallienne — Me, Myself and Mum**: Michel Bouquet — Renoir; Thierry Lhermitte — The French Minister; Romain Duris — Mood Indigo; Guillaume Canet — Jappeloup; Tahar Rahim — Grand Central	**Léa Seydoux — Blue Is the Warmest Colour & Grand Central**: Catherine Deneuve — On My Way; Sandrine Kiberlain — 9 Month Stretch; Emmanuelle Seigner — Venus in Fur; Christa Theret — Renoir; Juliette Binoche — Camille Claudel 1915
Best Male Revelation	Best Female Revelation
**Raphaël Personnaz** — **The French Minister** & **Marius**: Vincent Macaigne — La Fille du 14 juillet; Pierre Deladonchamps — Stranger by the Lake; Niels Schneider — Chaos; Tewfik Jallab — The Marchers; Paul Hamy — Suzanne	**Adèle Exarchopoulos** — **Blue Is the Warmest Colour**: Vimala Pons — La Fille du 14 juillet; Alice de Lencquesaing — Headfirst; Pauline Etienne — The Nun; Miss Ming — Henri; Marine Vacth — Young & Beautiful
Best First Film	Best Screenplay
**Me, Myself and Mum**: Little Lion; Turning Tide; Headfirst; Nous irons vivre ailleurs; Beyond the Blood	**David Ives** and **Roman Polanski** — **Venus in Fur**: Jean-Paul Lilienfeld and Jean Teulé — Arrêtez-moi; Bertrand Tavernier, Christophe Blain and Antonin Baudry — The French Minister; Asghar Farhadi — The Past; Nabil Ben Yadir — The Marchers; Albert Dupontel — 9 Month Stretch
Best French-Language Film	Best Cinematography
**Horses of God**: Today; The Repentant; Dead Man Talking; Gabrielle; The Dismantling	**Thomas Hardmeier** — **The Young and Prodigious T.S. Spivet**: Jérôme Alméras — The French Minister; Christophe Beaucarne — Mood Indigo; Crystel Fournier — A Place on Earth; Stéphane Fontaine — Jimmy P: Psychotherapy of a Plains Indian
Special Jury Prize
**Grand Central** — **Rebecca Zlotowski**

== See also ==
- 39th César Awards
- 4th Magritte Awards
