= 39th César Awards =

Film awards

- The official César Award poster features French actress Isabelle Adjani, in the 1994 film La Reine Margot.
- Date: 28 February 2014
- Site: Théâtre du Châtelet, Paris, France
- Hosted by: Cécile de France

Highlights
- Best Picture: Me, Myself and Mum
- Best Director: Roman Polanski
- Best Actor: Guillaume Gallienne; Me, Myself and Mum
- Best Actress: Sandrine Kiberlain; 9 Month Stretch
- Most awards: Me, Myself and Mum (5)
- Most nominations: Me, Myself and Mum (10)

Television coverage
- Network: Canal Plus

The 39th Annual César Awards ceremony, presented by the French Academy of Cinema Arts and Techniques (Académie des Arts et Techniques du Cinéma), was held on 28 February 2014, at the Théâtre du Châtelet in Paris. Me, Myself and Mum received ten nominations, Stranger by the Lake and Blue Is the Warmest Colour both received eight nominations each.

== Winners and nominees ==
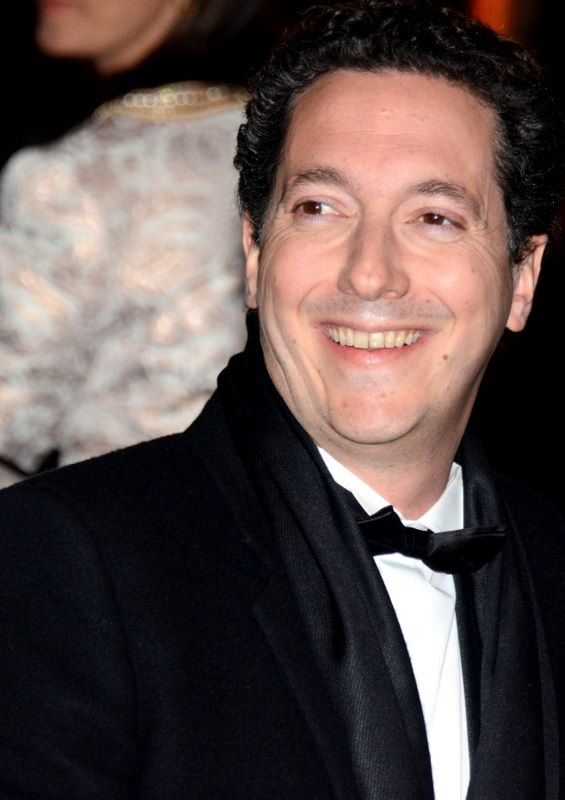
Guillaume Gallienne, director and star of Me, Myself and Mum, won the César Awards for Best Film and Best Actor.

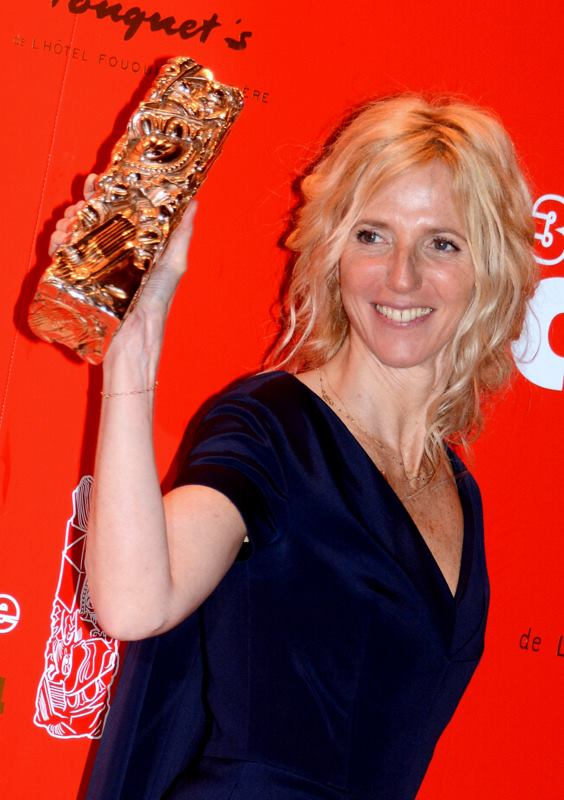
Sandrine Kiberlain, star of 9 Month Stretch, won the César Award for Best Actress.

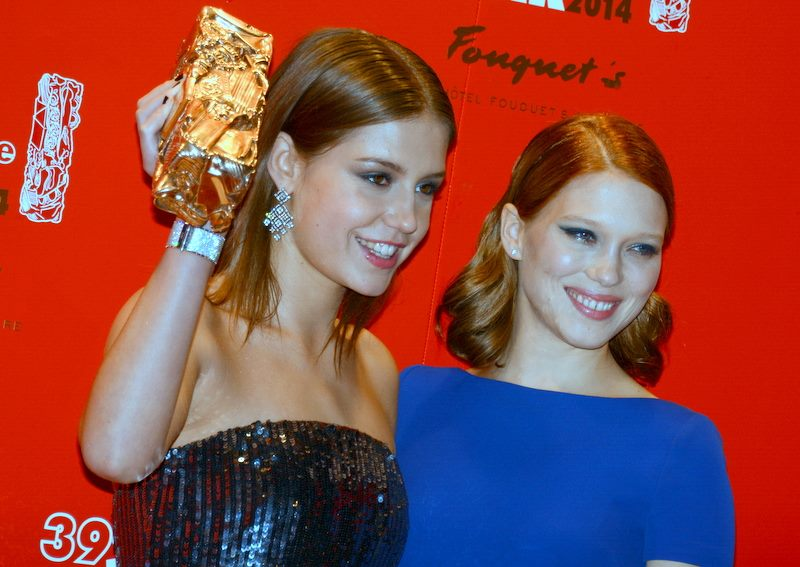
Adèle Exarchopoulos (left), won the César Award for Most Promising Actress and Léa Seydoux was nominated for the Best Actress award, both for Blue Is the Warmest Colour

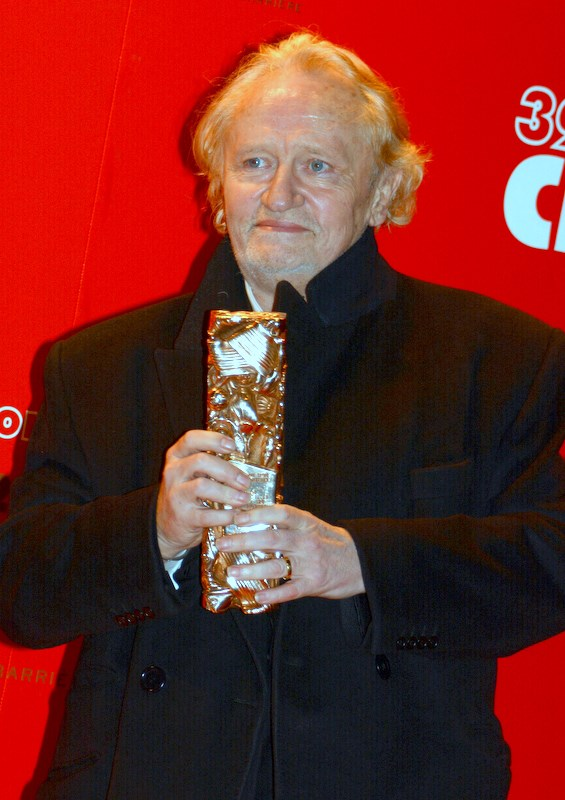
Niels Arestrup, Best Supporting Actor winner.

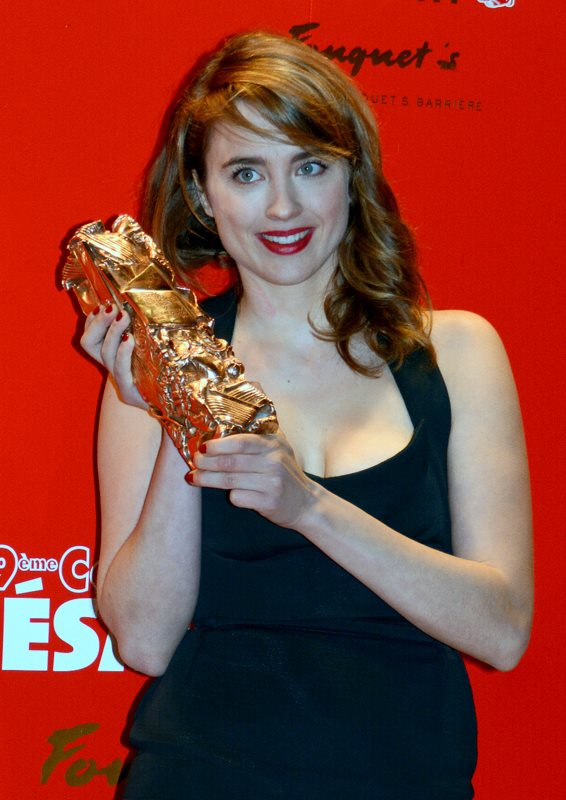
Adèle Haenel, Best Supporting Actress winner.

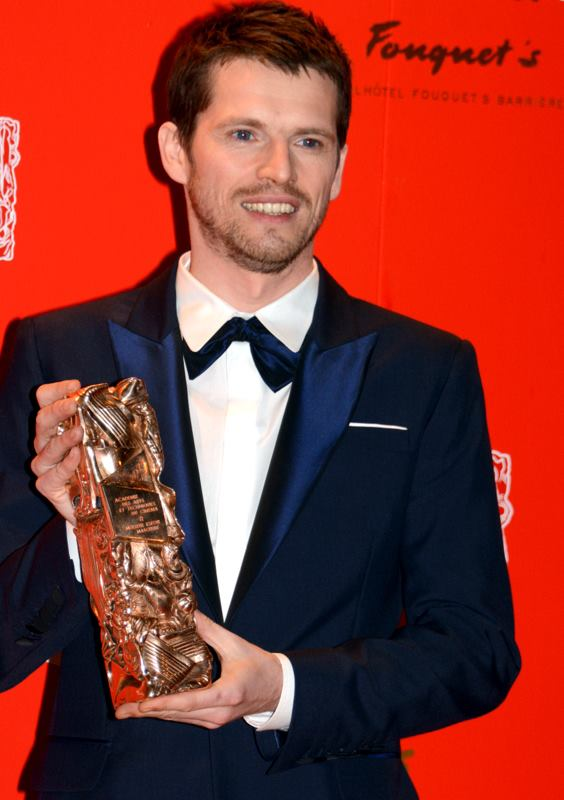
Pierre Deladonchamps, Most Promising Actor winner.

Winners are listed first and highlighted in bold:

Best Film	Best Director
**Me, Myself and Mum**: 9 Month Stretch; Stranger by the Lake; Jimmy P.; The Past; Venus in Fur; Blue Is the Warmest Colour	**Roman Polanski, Venus in Fur**: Albert Dupontel, 9 Month Stretch; Guillaume Gallienne, Me, Myself and Mum; Alain Guiraudie, Stranger by the Lake; Arnaud Desplechin, Jimmy P.; Asghar Farhadi, The Past; Abdellatif Kechiche, Blue Is the Warmest Colour
Best Actor	Best Actress
**Guillaume Gallienne, Me, Myself and Mum**: Mathieu Amalric, Venus in Fur; Michel Bouquet, Renoir; Albert Dupontel, 9 Month Stretch; Grégory Gadebois, One of a Kind; Fabrice Luchini, Cycling with Moliere; Mads Mikkelsen, Michael Kohlhaas	**Sandrine Kiberlain, 9 Month Stretch**: Fanny Ardant, Bright Days Ahead; Bérénice Bejo, The Past; Catherine Deneuve, On My Way; Sara Forestier, Suzanne; Emmanuelle Seigner, Venus in Fur; Léa Seydoux, Blue Is the Warmest Colour
Best Supporting Actor	Best Supporting Actress
**Niels Arestrup, Quai d'Orsay**: Patrick Chesnais, Bright Days Ahead; Patrick d'Assumçao, Stranger by the Lake; Olivier Gourmet, Grand Central; François Damiens, Suzanne	**Adèle Haenel, Suzanne**: Marisa Borini, A Castle in Italy; Françoise Fabian, Me, Myself and Mum; Julie Gayet, Quai d'Orsay; Géraldine Pailhas, Young & Beautiful
Most Promising Actor	Most Promising Actress
**Pierre Deladonchamps, Stranger by the Lake**: Paul Bartel, The Dream Kids; Paul Hamy, Suzanne; Vincent Macaigne, The Rendez-Vous of Déjà-Vu	**Adèle Exarchopoulos, Blue Is the Warmest Colour**: Lou de Laâge, Jappeloup; Pauline Étienne, The Nun; Golshifteh Farahani, The Patience Stone; Marine Vacth, Young & Beautiful
Best First Feature Film	Best Original Screenplay
**Me, Myself and Mum, Guillaume Gallienne**: La Bataille de Solferino, Justine Triet; The Gilded Cage, Ruben Alves; Turning Tide, Christophe Offenstein; The Rendez-Vous of Déjà-Vu, Antonin Peretjatko	**Albert Dupontel, 9 Month Stretch**: Philippe Le Guay, Cycling with Moliere; Alain Guiraudie, Stranger by the Lake; Asghar Farhadi, The Past; Katell Quillévéré, Mariette Désert, Suzanne
Best Cinematography	Best Adaptation
**Thomas Hardmeier, The Young and Prodigious T. S. Spivet**: Claire Mathon, Stranger by the Lake; Jeanne Lapoirie, Michael Kohlhaas; Mark Lee Ping Bin, Renoir; Sofian El Fani, Blue Is the Warmest Colour	**Guillaume Gallienne, Me, Myself and Mum**: Arnaud Desplechin, Julie Peyr, Kent Jones, Jimmy P.; Antonin Baudry, Christophe Blain, Bertrand Tavernier, Quai d'Orsay; David Ives, Roman Polanski, Venus in Fur; Abdellatif Kechiche, Ghalya Lacrois, Blue Is the Warmest Colour
Best Editing	Best Sound
**Valérie Deseine, Me, Myself and Mum**: Camille Toubkis, Albertine Lastera, Jean-Marie Lengellé, Blue Is the Warmest Colour; Christophe Pinel, 9 Month Stretch; Jean-Christophe Hym, Stranger by the Lake; Juliette Welfling, The Past	**Jean-Pierre Duret, Jean Mallet, Melissa Petitjean, Michael Kohlhaas**: Marc-Antoine Beldent, Loic Prian, Olivier Do Huu, Me, Myself and Mum; Philippe Grivel, Nathalie Vidal, Stranger by the Lake; Lucien Balibar, Nadine Muse, Cyril Holtz, Venus in Fur; Jérôme Chenevoy, Fabien Pochet, Jean-Paul Hurier, Blue Is the Warmest Colour
Best Music Written for a Film	Best Costume Design
**Martin Wheeler, Michael Kohlhaas**: Jorge Arriagada, Cycling with Moliere; Loik Dury, Christophe Minck, Chinese Puzzle; Étienne Charry, Mood Indigo; Alexandre Desplat, Venus in Fur	**Pascaline Chavanne, Renoir**: Florence Fontaine, Mood Indigo; Madeline Fontaine, The Young and Prodigious T. S. Spivet; Olivier Beriot, Me, Myself and Mum; Anina Diener, Michael Kohlhaas
Best Production Design	Best Documentary Film
**Stéphane Rozenbaum, Mood Indigo**: Aline Bonetto, The Young and Prodigious T. S. Spivet; Sylive Olive, Me, Myself and Mum; Yan Arlaud, Michael Kohlhaas; Benoit Barouh, Renoir	**Sur le Chemin de l'École, Pascal Plisson**: Comment J'ai Déteste les Maths, Olivier Peyon; Le Dernier des Injustes, Claude Lanzmann; Il Était une Forêt, Luc Jacquet; La Maison de la Raido, Nicolas Philibert
Best Animated Feature Film	Best Animated Short Film
**Loulou l'Incroyable Secret, Éric Omond**: Aya de Yopougon, Marguerite Aboute, Clément Oubrerie; My Mommy is in America and She Met Buffalo Bill, Marc Boréal, Thibaut Chatel	**Mademoiselle Kiki et les Montparnos, Amélie Harrault**: Lettres de Femmes, Augusto Zanovello
Best Foreign Film	Best Short Film
**The Broken Circle Breakdown, Felix Van Groeningen**: Blancanieves, Pablo Berger; Blue Jasmine, Woody Allen; Dead Man Talking, Patrick Ridremont; Django Unchained, Quentin Tarantino; La Grande Bellezza, Paolo Sorrentino; Gravity, Alfonso Cuaron	**Avant Que de Tout Perdre, Xavier Legrand**: Bambi, Sébastien Lifshitz; La Fugue, Jean-Bernard Marlin; Les Lezards, Vincent Mariette; Marseille la Nuit, Marie Monge
Honorary César
**Scarlett Johansson**

== Presenters ==
The following individuals, listed in order of appearance presented awards.

Name(s)	Role
Bérénice Bejo	Most Promising Actress
Audrey Fleurot	Most Promising Actor
Charles Berling	Best First Feature Film
André Dussolier	Best Supporting Actress
Jeremy Irons	Best Actress
Nicole Garcia	Best Actor
Pierre Niney	Best Adaptation
Stéphane De Groodt	Honorary Award

== Viewers ==
The show was followed by 2.3 million viewers. This corresponds to 11.2% of the audience.

== See also ==
- 19th Lumière Awards
- 4th Magritte Awards
- 26th European Film Awards
- 86th Academy Awards
- 67th British Academy Film Awards
- 59th David di Donatello
- 29th Goya Awards
