= Bite the Dust =

Bite the Dust may refer to:

- A figure of speech for death
- "Bite the Dust", a track on the 2005 Pussycat Dolls album PCD
- "Another One Bites the Dust", a 1980 song by Queen
- Bite the Dust (film), a 2013 Russian film
