= Nobody's Hero =

Nobody's Hero may refer to:

- "Nobody's Hero" (song), a song by Rush from the 1993 album Counterparts
- "Nobody's Hero", a song by Stiff Little Fingers from the 1980 album Nobody's Heroes
- "Nobody's Hero", a song by Raven from the 1981 album Rock Until You Drop
- "Nobody's Hero", a song by Bon Jovi from the 2004 album 100,000,000 Bon Jovi Fans Can't Be Wrong
- "Nobody's Hero", a song by Black Veil Brides from the 2013 album Wretched and Divine: The Story of the Wild Ones
- Nobody's Hero (film), a 2022 French film
- Nobody's Hero (1989 film), a 1989 film starring Jing Chen and Kathy Chow Hoi-Mei
- "Nobody's Hero" (Spider-Noir), an episode of Spider-Noir
