= Guillaume Gallienne =

French actor, screenwriter and film director (born 1972)

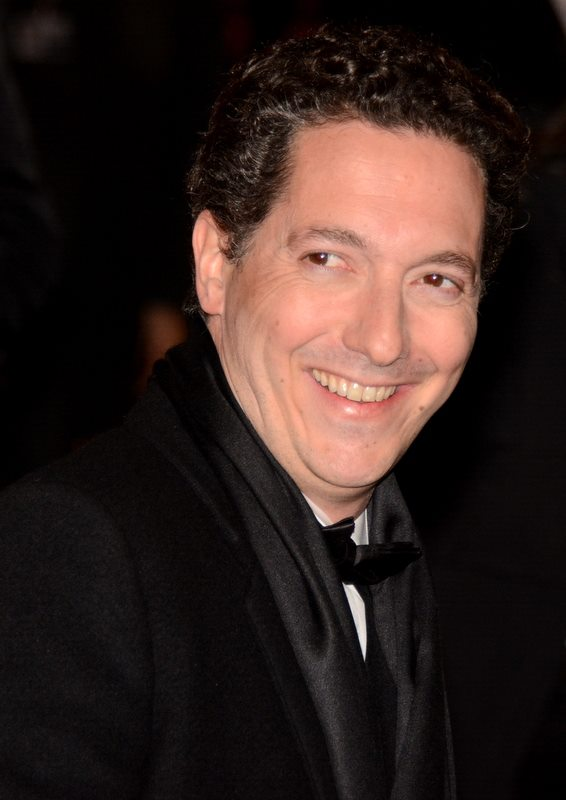
- Gallienne at the 39th César Awards
- Born: Guillaume Jean-Claude Pierre Gallienne; 8 February 1972 (age 54); Neuilly-sur-Seine, Hauts-de-Seine, France
- Occupations: Actor, screenwriter, director, producer
- Years active: 1992–present
- Spouse: Amandine Gallienne (m. 2005)

Guillaume Jean-Claude Pierre Gallienne (French pronunciation: [ɡijom ɡaljɛn]; born 8 February 1972) is a French actor, screenwriter and film director. He has received two Molière Awards for his stagework and has won two César Awards, one for writing and the other for his performance in his autobiographical comedy film Me, Myself and Mum (2013).

== Early life ==
Gallienne was born in the Parisian suburb of Neuilly-sur-Seine to French businessman Jean-Claude and Russian-Georgian aristocrat Melitta Gallienne, the third of four sons. From the age of 10, he attended La Salle Passy Buzenval in Rueil-Malmaison where he was bullied for his effeminate personality. Two years later, after a nervous breakdown, he was sent to St John's College near Portsmouth in England. The death of a close cousin convinced him to take up acting at the age of 19. He attended Cours Florent for three years before studying under Daniel Mesguich, Stéphane Braunschweig and Dominique Valadié at the French National Academy of Dramatic Arts, graduating in 1998.

== Career ==
Gallienne made his film debut in 1992 in Tableau d'honneur and he has starred in Sofia Coppola's 2006 film Marie Antoinette. Between 2008 and 2010, he had a short sketch segment entitled Les Bonus de Guillaume on Le Grand Journal, parodying DVD bonus features. He won a Molière Award for Best Newcomer in 2010 in his one-man stage show Boys and Guillaume, to the table! (Les Garçons et Guillaume, à table!) and another for Best Supporting Actor in 2011 in Un fil à la patte. He collaborated with choreographer Nicolas Le Riche to write the libretto for the 2011 Paris Opera Ballet production of Caligula. He adapted Bolshoi Ballet's 2014 Parisian production of Illusions perdues, choreographed by Alexei Ratmansky.

His 2013 film Me, Myself and Mum, an adaptation of his stage show, was screened in the Directors' Fortnight section at the 2013 Cannes Film Festival where it won the top prize (Art Cinema Award) and the Prix SACD. The film was nominated for ten César Awards, the most in 2014, winning five in total. Individually, he was awarded the César Award for Best Actor and the César Award for Best Adaptation. He also won the César Award for Best Film and César Award for Best First Film with producers.

Gallienne has been a member (Sociétaire) of the Comédie-Française company since 2005, having first entered in 1998. He became a Knight of the National Order of Merit in November 2008 and an Officer of the Order of Arts and Letters at the start of 2013. He has hosted a weekly literature show Ça peut pas faire de mal on France Inter since September 2009.

== Personal life ==
In 2001, Guillaume met his wife Amandine, a stylist, whom he married in 2005.

== Filmography ==
=== As actor ===
==== Film ====
- 1992: Tableau d'honneur (by Charles Nemes): Castagnier
- 1995: Sabrina (by Sydney Pollack): Assistant
- 1996: Un samedi sur la terre (by Diane Bertrand): Apprenti bijoutier
- 1997: Jeunesse (by Noël Alpi): Le lyonnais
- 1997: La Leçon de tango (The Tango Lesson) (by Sally Potter): Pablo's Friend
- 1999: Monsieur Naphtali by Olivier Schatzky: Sommergan
- 1999: Une pour toutes by Claude Lelouch: L'agent immobilier
- 2000: Jet Set by Fabien Onteniente: Evrard Sainte-Croix
- 2003: Fanfan la tulipe by Gérard Krawczyk: Aimé Bonaventure Claudion Dominique de La Houlette
- 2003: Monsieur Ibrahim et les fleurs du Coran by François Dupeyron: Le Vendeur de voitures
- 2004: Narco by Tristan Aurouet & Gilles Lellouche: Samuel Pupkin
- 2005: Tu vas rire, mais je te quitte by Philippe Harel: Pierre-Louis
- 2006: Fauteuils d'orchestre by Danièle Thompson: Pascal
- 2006: Marie-Antoinette by Sofia Coppola: Comte Vergennes
- 2006: La Jungle by Mathieu Delaporte: Mathias Warkhevytch
- 2006: Mon colonel (by Laurent Herbiet) - Sous-préfet
- 2007: Le Candidat by Niels Arestrup: Sam
- 2007: Benjamin Gates et le livre des secrets (National Treasure 2) by Jon Turteltaub: Un officier de police à bicyclette
- 2008: Sagan by Diane Kurys: Jacques Quoirez
- 2008: Musée haut, musée bas by Jean-Michel Ribes: Max Perdelli
- 2009: Le Concert by Radu Mihaileanu: un critique
- 2010: Ensemble, nous allons vivre une très, très grande histoire d'amour... by Pascal Thomas: Hubert
- 2010: L'Italien by Olivier Baroux: Jacques
- 2012: Confession d'un enfant du siècle by Sylvie Verheyde: Mercanson
- 2012: Astérix et Obélix: Au service de Sa Majesté by Laurent Tirard: Jolitorax
- 2013: Les garçons et Guillaume, à table ! by Guillaume Gallienne: Guillaume et la mère de Guillaume
- 2014: Yves Saint Laurent by Jalil Lespert: Pierre Bergé
- 2016: Down by Love by Pierre Godeau: Jean Firmino
- 2016: Cézanne and I by Danièle Thompson: Paul Cézanne
- 2021: Kaamelott: The First Chapter by Alexandre Astier: Alzagar
- 2021: The French Dispatch by Wes Anderson: Mr. B

===== Short films =====
- 1994: Les Flammes du désespoir by Guillaume Husson
- 1996: Putain de voleuses by Edy Garbarski
- 1996: Sans doute lui by Shiri Tsour
- 1997: Fils de personne by Niels Dubost
- 1998: Pop-corn by Yannick Rolandeau: Troisième badaud
- 1999: Mon plus beau mariage by Guillaume Husson: Le prêtre
- 2001: Le Cœur sur la main by Marie-Anne Chazel: Le snob
- 2001: En scène ! by Yvon Marciano
- 2001: L'Élu de Fouad Benamou
- 2006: Le Dernier Épisode de Dallas by Guillaume Husson: François
- 2009: L'Invitation by Niels Arestrup
- 2026: Comédie-Française by Martin Darondeau and Bertrand Usclat

==== Television ====
- 1995: Navarro (1 episode)
- 2002: Patron sur mesure by Stéphane Clavier: Leduc
- 2002: Les Frangines by Laurence Katrian: Edouard
- 2003: La Bête du Gévaudan by Patrick Volson: L'abbé Pourcher
- 2003: Maigret (1 episode)
- 2006: Monsieur Max by Gabriel Aghion: Max Jacob jeune
- 2007: Elles et moi by Bernard Stora: Robert
- 2008: Adieu De Gaulle, adieu by Laurent Herbiet: Bernard Tricot
- 2008–2010: Les Bonus de Guillaume (short program on Canal+)
- 2011: Hard (TV series – season 2) by Cathy Verney: himself
- 2017: Oblomov: Oblomov. He was also the director of the film
- 2021: La Vengeance au Triple Galop (TV film) by Alex Lutz and Arthur Sanigou: Claude Marquinnier
- 2024: The Regime (HBO Miniseries) by Will Tracy

==== DVD ====
- 2009: Les Bonus de Guillaume
- 2011: Les Bonus de Guillaume, Volume 2

==== Voice over ====
- 2005: L'homme de la lune (short film) by Serge Elissalde: voice of Lazare
- 2006: U by Serge Elissalde & Grégoire Solotareff: voice of Lazare
- 2010: Le Voyage extraordinaire de Samy by Ben Stassen: voice of Alphonse le chat
- 2010–2013: The Little Prince (TV series) by Pierre Alain Chartier: voice of Serpent
- 2012: Sammy 2 by Ben Stassen: voice of Lulu la moustache
- 2014: M. Peabody et Sherman: Les Voyages dans le temps by Rob Minkoff: voice of M. Peabody (V. F. de Ty Burrell)
- 2014: Paddington: voice of the bear: Paddington (V. 0. by Ben Whishaw)

== Honours ==
- Chevalier of the Ordre national du Mérite (2008)
- Molière Award for Best Newcomer in Les Garçons et Guillaume, à table! (2010)
- Molière Award for Best Supporting Actor in Un fil à la patte (2011)
- Lumière Award for Best Actor in Me, Myself and Mum (2014)
- César Award for Best Actor in Me, Myself and Mum (2014)
- César Award for Best Adaptation in Me, Myself and Mum (2014)
- Globes de Cristal Award for Best Actor in Me, Myself and Mum (2014)
- Commandeur of the Ordre des Arts et des Lettres (2022)
- Chevalier of the Ordre du Mérite culturel (2022)
- Chevalier of the Légion d'honneur (2025)
