= Wolfy, the Incredible Secret =

2013 French-Belgium animated feature film

- Directed by: Éric Omond
- Screenplay by: Grégoire Solotareff; Jean-Luc Fromental
- Produced by: Valérie Schermann; Christophe Jankovic
- Music by: Laurent Perez del Mar
- Production companies: Prima Linea Productions; Belvision Studios; France 3 RTBF
- Distributed by: Diaphana Distribution; Films Distribution
- Release date: 18 December 2013
- Running time: 80 minutes
- Countries: France; Belgium
- Language: French

Wolfy, the Incredible Secret (French: Loulou, l'incroyable secret) is a 2013 French-Belgian animated film directed by Éric Omond. The film draws on the creations of artist, writer and illustrator Grégoire Solotareff, who created the character Loulou in the eponymous children's book in 1989. The film was released in French theatres on 18 December 2013. It won the César Award for Best Animated Film at the 39th César Awards.

== Cast ==
- Malik Zidi as Loulou
- Stéphane Debac as Tom
- Anaïs Demoustier as Scarlett
- Carlo Brandt as Lou-Andrea
- Marianne Basler as Olympe
- Léonore Chaix as Cornélia
- Sarah-Jane Sauvegrain as Nina and Capitaine N
- Patrick Paroux as Momo
- Marie Berto as Rosetta
- Rémy Roubakha as Simon-Edgar Finkel
- John Arnold as Paul-Loup
