= Elżbieta Benkowska =

Polish film director (born 1988)

Elżbieta Benkowska (born 18 August 1988 in Gdańsk, in Poland) is a Polish film director, screenwriter and film editor. Her film Olena competed at the 2013 Cannes Film Festival. It was nominated for Short Film Palme d'Or.

Benkowska studied at the Gdynia Film School.
