= Grand Central (film) =

2013 film

- French release poster
- Directed by: Rebecca Zlotowski
- Written by: Rebecca Zlotowski; Gaëlle Macé
- Produced by: Frédéric Jouve
- Starring: Tahar Rahim; Léa Seydoux; Denis Ménochet; Olivier Gourmet; Johan Libéreau; Nahuel Pérez Biscayart
- Cinematography: Georges Lechaptois
- Edited by: Julien Lacheray
- Music by: Robin Coudert
- Production companies: Les Films Velvet; France 3 Cinéma; Rhône-Alpes Cinéma; KGP Kranzelbinder Gabriele Production
- Distributed by: Ad Vitam (France)
- Release dates: 18 May 2013 (Cannes); 28 August 2013 (France)
- Running time: 95 minutes
- Countries: France; Austria
- Language: French
- Budget: $3.9 million
- Box office: $1.7 million

Grand Central is a 2013 drama film directed by Rebecca Zlotowski, and co-written by Gaëlle Macé and Zlotowski. Starring Tahar Rahim, Léa Seydoux, Denis Ménochet, Olivier Gourmet and Johan Libéreau, it follows Gary (Rahim), an unemployed young man, who finds a new job and a new lover in nuclear power plant in the French countryside.

The film had its world premiere at the Un Certain Regard section of the 2013 Cannes Film Festival on 18 May, where it won the François Chalais Prize. It was theatrically released in France by Ad Vitam on 28 August. It received positive reviews.

== Plot ==
Gary, an unskilled young man, lands a job as a decontamination sub-contractor at a nuclear power plant in the lower valley of the Rhone. Inducted into the workforce by supervisor Gilles and veteran Toni, Gary discovers that radiation contamination is not just a risk factor but an everyday hazard. At the same time, he begins an illicit affair with Karole, Toni's fiancée.

== Cast ==
- Tahar Rahim as Gary Manda
- Léa Seydoux as Karole
- Denis Ménochet as Toni
- Olivier Gourmet as Gilles
- Johan Libéreau as Tcherno
- Nahuel Pérez Biscayart as Isaac
- Camille Lellouche as Géraldine
- Nozha Khouadra as Maria
- Guillaume Verdier as Bertrand
- Marie Berto as Morali

== Soundtrack ==
Indie pop singer Jeremy Jay recorded the song "Ghost Tracks" for the soundtrack.

== Reception ==
=== Critical response ===
On the review aggregator website Rotten Tomatoes, 90% of 29 critics' reviews are positive, with an average rating of 6.5/10. The website's consensus reads: "Disquieting, smartly scripted, and rounded out by a talented cast, Grand Central finds director Rebecca Zlotowski taking a remarkable step forward." Metacritic, which uses a weighted average, assigned the film a score of 73 out of 100, based on 6 critics, indicating "generally favorable" reviews.

=== Accolades ===
Award / Film Festival	Category	Recipients and nominees	Result
Cabourg Film Festival	Grand Prix	Grand Central	Won
2013 Cannes Film Festival	François Chalais Prize	Grand Central	Won
2013 Cannes Film Festival	Prix Un Certain Regard	Grand Central	Nominated
39th César Awards	Best Supporting Actor	Olivier Gourmet	Nominated
Globes de Cristal Award	Best Film	Grand Central	Nominated
19th Lumière Awards	Best Film	Grand Central	Nominated
19th Lumière Awards	Best Director	Rebecca Zlotowski	Nominated
19th Lumière Awards	Best Actor	Tahar Rahim	Nominated
19th Lumière Awards	Best Actress	Léa Seydoux	Won
19th Lumière Awards	Special Jury Prize	Grand Central	Won
4th Magritte Awards	Best Supporting Actor	Olivier Gourmet	Nominated
