= Thomas Doret =

Belgian actor

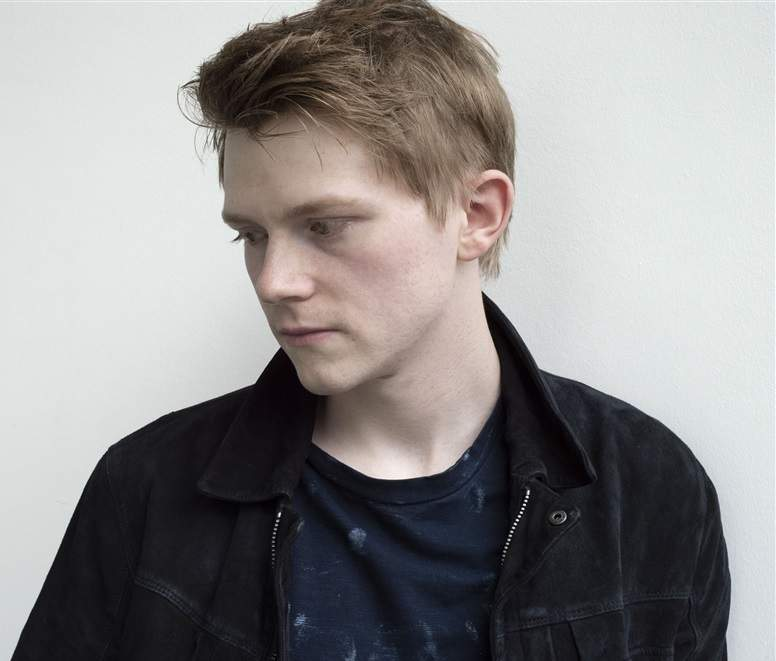
- Born: 10 December 1996 (age 29); Seraing, Belgium
- Occupation: Actor
- Years active: 2011–present

Thomas Doret (born 10 December 1996) is a Belgian actor, best known for playing the role of Cyril in The Kid with a Bike, and as Coco in Renoir.

== Life and career ==
Doret was born in Seraing. His father is a warehouseman while his mother is a printer. He practiced karate and tennis from the age of 6. He studied at the Athénée Royal Air Pur of Seraing.

In 2013 he participated as Président du jury jeune at the Festival international du film policier de Liège and has also received the honor of Ambassadeur d'honneur de la province de Liège

At 13, he played his first starring film role, playing the role of Cyril, in the Dardenne brothers' film The Kid with a Bike, alongside Cécile de France. In 2012, he played the role of Claude Renoir, one of the son of Pierre Renoir, alongside Michel Bouquet, in Gilles Bourdos' Renoir.

He is currently working in a television series of 6 episodes titled Paris, the series tells the story of daily 14 characters, including Doret, in the capital of France.

== Filmography ==
Year	Title	Role	Notes
2011	The Kid with a Bike	Cyril Catoul	
2012	Renoir	Claude 'Coco' Renoir	
2014	Petit homme	David	Short film
2014	Sacré Charlemagne	Jean-François	Short film
2014	Three Hearts	Gabriel	
2014	Witnesses	Jérémie Gorbier	TV mini-series
2015	Paris	Clément Ardent	TV series
2015	Au plus près du Soleil	The accused man's son	
2016	Ambre	Luca	Short film
2016	The Unknown Girl	Lucas	
2017	Zone Blanche	Rudy Guerin	TV series
2025	Silent Rebellion	Husband	

== Awards and nominations ==
Year	Award	Category	Work	Result
2011	Valladolid International Film Festival	Honorable Mention	The Kid with a Bike	Won
2011	Cannes Film Festival	Grand Prix	The Kid with a Bike	Won
2011	Texture Film Festival (Russia)	Prix du meilleur acteur	The Kid with a Bike	Won
2011	L’artiste Liégeois de l'année 2011			Won
2012	Young Artist Awards	Best Performance in an International Feature Film - Leading Young Performer	The Kid with a Bike	Nominated
2012	Magritte Awards	Most Promising Actor	The Kid with a Bike	Won
