= The Boss's Daughter =

- Theatrical release poster
- La Fille du patron
- Directed by: Olivier Loustau
- Written by: Olivier Loustau; Bérénice André; Agnès Caffin
- Produced by: Lisa Azuelos; Julie Gayet; Nadia Turincev; Julien Madon
- Starring: Christa Theret; Olivier Loustau
- Cinematography: Crystel Fournier
- Edited by: Camille Toubkis
- Music by: Fixi
- Production companies: Rouge International; Bethsabée Mucho
- Distributed by: Wild Bunch Distribution
- Release dates: 14 November 2015 (Sarlat); 6 January 2016 (France)
- Running time: 98 minutes
- Country: France
- Language: French
- Budget: $3.2 million
- Box office: $127.000

The Boss's Daughter (original title: La Fille du patron) is a 2015 French romance film directed and co-written by Olivier Loustau and starring Loustau and Christa Theret.

== Cast ==
- Christa Theret as Alix Baretti
- Olivier Loustau as Vital
- Florence Thomassin as Madeleine
- Patrick Descamps as Baretti
- Stéphane Rideau as Marc
- Lola Dueñas as Virginia
- Moussa Maaskri as Azoug
- Sabine Pakora as Gladys
- Pierre Berriau as Frano
- Vincent Martinez as Eddy
- Deborah Grall as Cathy
- Ludovic Berthillot as Lolo
- Élodie Mennegand as Caroline
- Sébastien Chabal as himself

== Accolades ==
Award / Film Festival	Category	Recipients and nominees	Result
Cabourg Film Festival	Swann d'Or for Female Revelation	Christa Theret	Won
