= 9 Month Stretch =

- Film poster
- Directed by: Albert Dupontel
- Written by: Albert Dupontel
- Produced by: Catherine Bozorgan
- Starring: Sandrine Kiberlain; Albert Dupontel
- Cinematography: Vincent Mathias
- Edited by: Christophe Pinel
- Music by: Christophe Julien
- Distributed by: Wild Bunch Distribution
- Release date: 16 October 2013
- Running time: 82 minutes
- Country: France
- Language: French
- Budget: $8.5 million
- Box office: $17.9 million

9 Month Stretch (French: 9 mois ferme) is a 2013 French comedy film written, directed by and starring Albert Dupontel. It was nominated for six categories at the 39th César Awards including Best Film and Best Director and Best Actor for Dupontel, winning Best Actress for its co-star Sandrine Kiberlain and Best Original Screenplay.

== Plot ==
Ariane Felder, a judge in her forties, a little stuck and single, is totally reluctant to date men. On New Year's Eve 2013, strongly encouraged by her colleagues, she drinks more than enough and loses control of herself.

Six months later, Ariane discovers that she is pregnant but not sure who the father is. She first thinks that it is a judge De Bernard, an enterprising colleague who is too sweet with her. However, she conducts an investigation and discovers that the father of her child is the famous Robert Nolan, alias "Bob Nolan", lover of prostitutes and burglar multiple repeat offenders, suspected of having cut the four limbs of an old man.

Being arrested, Nolan seems to recognize the judge during an interview with her, still unaware that the child she is carrying is his. Later, on the run, he breaks into her home, surprises her attempting a "criminal" abortion by intentionally falling on her stomach from a pile of furniture. Finally, he offers a deal: he won't reveal anything about his nights if she helps him demonstrate that he's not the barbaric eye-eater who is making headlines around the world.

== Cast ==
- Sandrine Kiberlain as Ariane Felder
- Albert Dupontel as Robert Nolan
- Nicolas Marié as Attorney Trolos
- Philippe Uchan as Judge Bernard
- Gilles Gaston-Dreyfus as Monsieur De Lime
- Christian Hecq as Lieutenant Édouard
- Philippe Duquesne as Doctor Toulate
- Laure Calamy as Daisy
- Terry Gilliam as Charles Meatson, Famous Man Eater
- Yolande Moreau as Bob's mother
- Bouli Lanners as policeman
- Michel Fau as gynecologist
- Jean Dujardin as sign language interpreter
- Ray Cooper as CNN journalist
- Gaspar Noé as bald inmate #1
- Jan Kounen as bald inmate #2
- Babetida Sadjo as The victim of the sink

== Background ==
Dupontel was inspired by 10e chambre, instants d'audience, a documentary by Raymond Depardon in which judge Michèle Bernard-Requin appears. Bernard-Requin also plays a judge in Neuf mois ferme.

Dupontel originally intended to make Neuf mois ferme his first English-language film, with Emma Thompson playing Ariane Felder.

The name of the coroner Toulate ("too late") character comes from this first intention. He chose to name his main character Ariane in reference to Ariadne as this character loses the thread. Attorney Trolos' name means stutterer in Ancient Greek.

== Awards ==
=== César Awards ===
- Best Actress (Sandrine Kiberlain)
- Best Original Screenplay
