= Renoir (2012 film) =

2012 French drama film by Gilles Bourdos

- Film poster
- Directed by: Gilles Bourdos
- Screenplay by: Jérome Tonnerre; Michel Spinosa; Gilles Bourdos
- Based on: Le Tableau amoureux by Jacques Renoir
- Produced by: Olivier Delbosc; Marc Missonnier
- Starring: Michel Bouquet; Christa Théret; Vincent Rottiers; Thomas Doret
- Cinematography: Mark Lee Ping Bin
- Edited by: Yannick Kergoat
- Music by: Alexandre Desplat
- Distributed by: Mars Distribution
- Release dates: 25 May 2012 (Cannes); 2 January 2013 (France)
- Running time: 111 minutes
- Country: France
- Language: French
- Budget: $6 million
- Box office: $6.7 million

Renoir is a 2012 French drama film based on the last years of Pierre-Auguste Renoir at Cagnes-sur-Mer during World War I. The film was directed by Gilles Bourdos and competed in the Un Certain Regard section at the 2012 Cannes Film Festival. The film is set in the south of France during World War I and stars Michel Bouquet, Christa Theret, Thomas Doret and Vincent Rottiers.

Renoir achieved critical and commercial success both in France and abroad, most notably in the United States where it is on the Critic's Pick list of The New York Times. The film was selected as the French entry for the Best Foreign Language Film at the 86th Academy Awards, but was not nominated. In January 2014, the film received four nominations at the 39th César Awards, winning for Best Costume Design.

== Plot ==
The film tells the forgotten story of Andrée Heuschling, also known as Catherine Hessling, who was the last model of impressionist painter Pierre-Auguste Renoir and the first actress in the films of his son, the film director Jean Renoir. Andrée was the link between two famous and widely acclaimed artists, a father and son. While the father is at the end of his brilliant career, the son is still searching for himself, his great career as one of the most celebrated movie directors having not yet begun.

Director Gilles Bourdos used the services of a convicted art forger, Guy Ribes, to create and re-create the Renoir paintings in live action on screen.

== Cast ==
- Michel Bouquet as Auguste Renoir
- Christa Théret as Andrée Heuschling
- Vincent Rottiers as Jean Renoir
- Thomas Doret as Coco
- Romane Bohringer as Gabrielle Renard
- Michèle Gleizer as Mme Renoir (Aline Charigot)
- Carlo Brandt as Le docteur Pratt
- Hélène Babu as Odette
- Marion Lécrivain as Véra Sergine
- Hervé Briaux as Ambroise Vollard
- Stuart Seide as le docteur Barnes
- Emmanuelle Lepoutre as la Médecine
- Thierry Hancisse as le brocanteur
- Annelise Heimburger as la Boulangère
- Sylviane Goudal as la Grande Louise
- Solène Rigot as Madeleine

== Reception ==
=== Critical response ===
The film received generally favorable reviews from critics. The review aggregator Rotten Tomatoes reported 72% of critics gave the film a positive review based on 69 reviews, with an average score of 6.5/10. The critical consensus is: "Appropriately enough, Renoir offers viewers a drama of sumptuous beauty—which is more than enough to offset its frustratingly slow pace and rather thinly written screenplay." Metacritic, which assigns a standardized score out of 100, rated the film 64 based on 23 reviews, indicating "generally favorable reviews".

=== Accolades ===
Award / Film Festival	Category	Recipients and nominees	Result
AARP Movies for Grownups Awards	Best Foreign Film		Won
American Society of Cinematographers Awards	Spotlight Award	Mark Lee Ping Bin	Nominated
Cannes Film Festival	Prix Un certain regard		Nominated
César Awards	Best Actor	Michel Bouquet	Nominated
César Awards	Best Cinematography	Mark Lee Ping Bin	Nominated
César Awards	Best Production Design	Benoît Barouh	Nominated
César Awards	Best Costume Design	Pascaline Chavanne	Won
Lumière Awards	Best Film		Nominated
Lumière Awards	Best Director	Gilles Bourdos	Nominated
Lumière Awards	Best Actor	Michel Bouquet	Nominated
Lumière Awards	Best Actress	Christa Theret	Nominated
World Soundtrack Award	Soundtrack Composer of the Year	Alexandre Desplat	Nominated

== See also ==
- List of submissions to the 86th Academy Awards for Best Foreign Language Film
- List of French submissions for the Academy Award for Best Foreign Language Film
