= U (film) =

- Directed by: Serge Élissalde and Grégoire Solotareff.
- Starring: Artus de Penguern
- Music by: Stéphane Sanseverino
- Release date: October 11, 2006
- Running time: 75 minutes
- Country: France
- Language: French

U is a 2006 French animated film directed by Serge Élissalde and Grégoire Solotareff. It was at the 2007 Seattle International Film Festival.
