= Me, Myself and Mum =

2013 film

- French theatrical release poster
- Directed by: Guillaume Gallienne
- Screenplay by: Guillaume Gallienne
- Based on: Les garçons et Guillaume, à table! by Guillaume Gallienne
- Produced by: Cyril Colbeau-Justin; Jean-Baptiste Dupont; Edouard Weil
- Starring: Guillaume Gallienne; André Marcon; Françoise Fabian; Nanou Garcia
- Cinematography: Glynn Speeckaert
- Edited by: Valérie Deseine
- Music by: Marie-Jeanne Serero
- Production companies: LGM Productions; Rectangle Productions; Gaumont
- Distributed by: Gaumont
- Release dates: 20 May 2013 (Cannes); 20 November 2013 (France)
- Running time: 85 minutes
- Country: France
- Language: French
- Budget: $8.5 million
- Box office: $25 million

Me, Myself and Mum (French: Les Garçons et Guillaume, à table !) is a 2013 French autobiographical coming-of-age comedy film written, directed by and starring Guillaume Gallienne. Based on his stage show of the same name, it follows Guillaume as a boy as he develops his own identity and his relationship with his mother.

The film premiered at the 2013 Cannes Film Festival and was released in France on 20 November 2013. In January 2014, the film was nominated for 10 César Awards and won 5, including Best Film and Best First Feature Film.

== Plot ==
In a theatre, Guillaume recounts how his life developed as a youth. As a young effeminate boy, his mother casually dismisses his antics. When he asks to go and learn Spanish, his mother sends him to La Línea de la Concepción. There he stays with Paqui, a Spanish woman unable to speak French. As they awkwardly try to communicate, she suggests teaching him how to dance the sevillanas. Becoming proficient, Guillaume dances at a local festival but is subjected to laughter. Oblivious to why, he asks a woman named Pilar to dance with him. She politely refuses, explaining to him how he dances like a girl. He asks her if she thinks he looks like a girl. She agrees and he happily remarks that his mother would be delighted.

Fascinated by his mother, Guillaume imitates her voice to the family cook and his grandmother, Babou. His father, however, is dissatisfied with his son's behaviour. After catching him pretending to be Sissi, his father sends him away to an all-boys boarding school. Unable to withstand the constant taunting, Guillaume writes a plea to his father. Following a psychiatric assessment, his parents decide to transfer him to an English boarding school.

Guillaume revels in his new school, a place where he is no longer judged by his personality. He develops an attraction to a schoolboy named Jeremy, but is heartbroken when he discovers Jeremy having sex with a girl. While his mother tries to console him, she inadvertently blurts out that he is homosexual, a thought that did not initially occur to him. He gains exemption from his national service because of his fragile state.

After a series of psychotherapy sessions, Guillaume decides to visit a Bavarian spa to relax. There he is given a painful sports massage by Raymund and an unexpected colonic by Ingeborg. Still conflicted about his sexuality, he is advised by his aunt to experiment. During his first attempt, he introduces himself to a man named Karim at a nightclub and follows him home. At Karim's flat, he finds two other men waiting to gang bang him. He escapes after Karim realises that he is not an Arab. In his second attempt, he meets a well-endowed man and panics.

Eventually, Guillaume meets a woman named Amandine at a friend's dinner party. He falls in love and they get engaged. When broaching the subject to his mother, she begins to question his sexuality. Guillaume realises that she finds this difficult to accept because she fears losing him to another woman.

== Cast ==
- Guillaume Gallienne as Guillaume/Mother
- André Marcon as Father
- Françoise Fabian as Babou
- Nanou Garcia as Paqui
- Diane Kruger as Ingeborg
- Reda Kateb as Karim
- Götz Otto as Raymund
- Françoise Lépine as Mom theater
- Brigitte Catillon as the American aunt
- Carol Brenner as the multi-lingual aunt
- Charlie Anson as Jeremy
- Hervé Pierre as the Army psychiatrist

== Production ==
Taken from his successful 2008 one-man stage show at the Théâtre de l’Ouest Parisien, Gallienne adapted the script for film with the help of Claude Mathieu and her husband, Nikolas Vassiliev. The film was produced by LGM Productions, Rectangle Productions and Gaumont. Filming took place on location in Paris in July 2012.

In a 2014 interview with The Guardian, Gallienne explained how the concept came to him during therapy session, expressing how "it became the connecting link for all the separate anecdotes in the puzzle of my life; as if all the years of confusion suddenly made sense." In an interview with Le Monde, he described how as a young boy he would be very feminine, giving the impression that he was homosexual. The original French title (”Boys, Guillaume, dinner is served!“) originates from a phrase his mother would use when calling her children to a meal, which Gallienne has suggested was her means of differentiating between himself and her more masculine sons.

The play has been translated into German by Karolina Fell, published by Rowohlt Verlag and will be presented in a first foreign language production as "Maman und ich" at the Theater O-TonArt in Berlin on 30 September 2016. The role of Guillaume is going to be played by André Fischer, directed by Alexander Katt.

== Reception ==
Film reviews were generally positive, with a 3.9 out of 5 rating on AlloCiné based on 23 critics' reviews. Stephen Dalton writing for The Hollywood Reporter described the film as "sweet and sunny and shamelessly sentimental in places", with "shades of Pedro Almodovar". Variety critic, Peter Debruge called it a "self-deprecating crowdpleaser", and considered Galliene a "curly-haired version of American funnyman Tony Hale". Critics particularly praised Galliene's performance in the film. For Les Fiches du cinéma, Cyrille Latour described it as a "remarkable mix of funny, tenderness and cruelty". Comparisons were drawn between Galliene's role as his mother and Dustin Hoffman's performance in the 1982 film Tootsie. However, Julien Kojfer at L'Obs criticised the film for containing numerous clichéd characterisations within the storyline.

Writing for the Slate, Charlotte Pudlowski thought the film was socially relevant at a time when the issue of same-sex marriage in France was being discussed, stating that "there was something very unique to the film's history about a boy who thinks he is a girl, in a family who believes he is gay and who eventually marries a young woman". She also noted that the film, while similarly themed, was not as sexually explicit as 2013 Palme d'Or winner, Blue Is the Warmest Colour.

Me, Myself and Mum grossed $24 million in total worldwide, with $22,479,449 earned in France. It became the fifth best cinematic opening of 2013 in France, debuting at the top of the French box office and selling 69,342 tickets across 406 screens in its first week. The film was screened in the Directors' Fortnight section at the 2013 Cannes Film Festival where it received a standing ovation. It also won the top prize (Art Cinema Award) and the Prix SACD. In January 2014, the film was nominated for ten César Awards at the 39th César Awards and won awards for Best Film and Best First Feature Film.

=== Accolades ===
Award	Category	Nominee(s)	Result
19th Lumière Awards	Best First Film	Me, Myself and Mum	Won
19th Lumière Awards	Best Actor	Guillaume Gallienne	Won
39th César Awards	Best Film	Me, Myself and Mum	Won
39th César Awards	Best First Feature Film	Me, Myself and Mum	Won
39th César Awards	Best Director	Guillaume Gallienne	Nominated
39th César Awards	Best Actor	Guillaume Gallienne	Won
39th César Awards	Best Supporting Actress	Françoise Fabian	Nominated
39th César Awards	Best Adaptation	Guillaume Gallienne	Won
39th César Awards	Best Editing	Valérie Deseine	Won
39th César Awards	Best Sound	Marc-Antoine Beldent, Loic Prian, Olivier Do Huu	Nominated
39th César Awards	Best Costume Design	Olivier Beriot	Nominated
39th César Awards	Best Production Design	Sylive Olive	Nominated
2013 Deauville American Film Festival	Prix Michel d'Ornano (Michel d'Ornano Award for debut French film	Guillaume Gallienne	Won
