= Christa Théret =

French actor

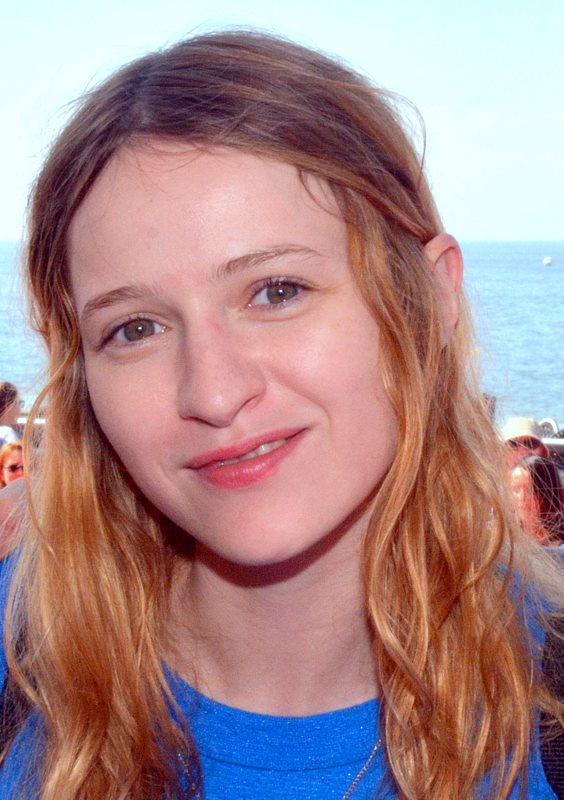
- Théret in 2016
- Occupation: Actor
- Years active: 2005–present

Christa Théret is a French actor, best known for their roles as Lola in LOL (Laughing Out Loud) and as Andrée Heuschling in Renoir.

== Early life ==
As a child, Théret aspired to be a teacher and then an actor.

== Career ==
Théret's acting career began at the age of 11; while playing in a school playground, they were noticed by a casting director, who then hired them for the film The Axe, in 2005. In this film, directed by Costa-Gavras, they play Betty, the daughter of Bruno and Marlène Davert (played by José Garcia and Karin Viard).

In 2007, they played Julie, a gothic teenager, in the film Et toi, t'es sur qui? (selected at the 2007 Cannes Film Festival in the Un Certain Regard category and for the Caméra d'or). While enrolled at the Lycée Jules Ferry in Paris, they dropped out of school at the age of 17. In 2008, they had their first big break with the lead role in Lisa Azuelos' blockbuster LOL (Laughing Out Loud), co-starring with Sophie Marceau. The commercial success of this film brought them to the attention of the general public, and they were nominated for a César for Best Promising Actress.

Theret is currently writing their first short film.

== Personal life ==
Apart from acting, Théret writes experimental poetry, which they illustrate with their own drawings.

Théret is non-binary and queer, and goes by they/them pronouns.

== Filmography ==
Year	Title	Role	Notes
2005	The Axe	Betty Davert	
2007	Et toi t'es sur qui?	Julie dite Batman	Nominated – Lumière Award for Best Female Revelation
2008	LOL (Laughing Out Loud)	Lola	Nominated – César Award for Most Promising Actress; Nominated – Lumière Award for Best Female Revelation
2009	Hôpital	Vanessa	Short
2010	Au siècle de Maupassant: Contes et nouvelles du XIXème siècle	Chiffon	TV Series; 1 Episode
2010	The Clink of Ice	Evguenia	
2011	Mike	Sandy	
2011	Twiggy	Sarah Dol	Nominated – César Award for Most Promising Actress
2012	Free Way	Rachel	
2012	The Man Who Laughs	Déa	
2013	Renoir	Andrée Heuschling	Nominated – Lumière Award for Best Actress
2014	L'Affaire SK1	Elisabeth Ortega	
2015	Marguerite	Hazel	
2015	Long Way North	Sasha	Voice
2015	Deux	Solange	Telefilm
2016	The Boss's Daughter	Alix Baretti	Cabourg Film Festival – Female Revelation
2017	Broers	Josephine	
2017	Maximilian	Mary of Burgundy	
2018	Non-Fiction	Laure	
2018	Gaspard va au mariage	Coline	
2019	Foals - Exits		Music Video
2019	Yung Lean - My Agenda		Music Video
2019	Noces d'or	Célestine Saint-Cast	
2021	The Rope	Leïla	Miniseries 3 episodes
2021	The Adventures of Young Voltaire	Adrienne Lecouvreur	Miniseries 4 episodes
2022	Pachyderme	Louise (Voice)	Animated Short
2023	She Is Conann	Conann at 25	
2023	Luise	Emma	

== Distinctions ==
=== Awards ===
- Berlinale 2013: Shooting Star
- Festival du film de Cabourg 2016: Swann d'or de la révélation féminine for La Fille du patron

=== Nominations ===
- 13th Lumière Awards (2008): Most Promising Actress for Et toi t'es sur qui ?
- 35th César Awards (2010): Most Promising Actress for LOL (Laughing Out Loud)
- 15th Lumière Awards (2010): Most Promising Actress for LOL (Laughing Out Loud)
- 37th César Awards (2012): Most Promising Actress for La Brindille
- 19th Lumière Awards (2014): Best Actress for Renoir
- Prix Romy Schneider 2016
