= Jimmy P: Psychotherapy of a Plains Indian =

2013 French film

- Film poster
- Directed by: Arnaud Desplechin
- Written by: Arnaud Desplechin; Julie Peyr; Kent Jones
- Produced by: Pascal Caucheteux; Grégoire Sorlat
- Starring: Benicio del Toro; Mathieu Amalric
- Cinematography: Stéphane Fontaine
- Edited by: Laurence Briaud
- Music by: Howard Shore
- Production companies: Why Not Productions; Wild Bunch; Orange Studio; France 2 Cinéma; Hérodiade; Le Pacte
- Distributed by: Le Pacte
- Release dates: 18 May 2013 (Cannes); 11 September 2013 (France)
- Running time: 120 minutes
- Country: France
- Language: English
- Box office: $30,283

Jimmy P: Psychotherapy of a Plains Indian is a 2013 French drama film directed by Arnaud Desplechin.

Jimmy P. stars Benicio del Toro as title character Jimmy Picard, a Blackfoot Native American who has returned to Montana from World War II and suffers debilitating symptoms. Mathieu Amalric, who has appeared in most of Arnaud Desplechin’s films, plays George Devereux, a French doctor of Hungarian-Jewish background. He is called in as a specialist in ethnology and psychoanalysis. Jimmy P. is primarily based on Devereux's book, Reality and Dream: Psychotherapy of a Plains Indian (1951). The film is set at a veterans' hospital in Topeka, Kansas, during the pioneering days of psychoanalysis in the United States.

Jimmy P. was released commercially in Europe in September 2013, and was released in the US and Canada in early 2014. It received a nomination for the Palme d'Or at 2013 Cannes Film Festival, and in January 2014, three nominations at the 39th César Awards, including Best Picture, Best Director, and Best Adapted Screenplay.

== Cast ==
- Benicio del Toro as James "Jimmy" Picard
- Mathieu Amalric as Dr. George Devereux
- Elya Baskin as Dr. Hans Jokl
- Gina McKee as Madeleine Steiner
- Joseph Cross as Dr. Robert R. Holt
- Ricky Wayne as Dr. Trygve Braatoy
- Larry Pine as Dr. Karl Menninger
- Gary Farmer as Jack
- Michelle Thrush as Gayle Picard
- Misty Upham as Jane Whitecloud
- A Martinez as Bear Willie Claw
- Jennifer Podemski as Doll
- Michael Greyeyes as Allan
- Lily Gladstone as Sunshine First Circle

== Production ==
Desplechin, Kent Jones, and Julie Peyr wrote the screenplay, adapted from Devereux's 1951 book. The film is set primarily at a veterans' hospital in Topeka, Kansas, where Karl Menninger was among the staff treating men after World War II. With flashbacks to Jimmy Picard's life on the reservation and in Montana, the film was shot in Michigan and Montana.

== Critical reception ==
Jimmy P. received mixed to positive reviews from critics. On Rotten Tomatoes, the film has an approval rating of 52% based on 33 reviews, with an average rating of 5.1/10. The site's critical consensus reads, "Jimmy P. has interesting ideas and talented stars, but director Arnaud Desplechin can't seem to figure out how to bring them together." On Metacritic, the film holds a score of 58 out of 100, indicating "mixed or average reviews".

The film was praised for its sensitive portrayal of Blackfoot Jimmy Picard. Matt Zoller Seitz awarded the film 3.5 out of 4 stars, commenting, "the movie offers the most psychologically complex screen portrait of a Native American character in at least twenty years, probably more" and "those who have undergone such treatment will appreciate how accurately the film portrays the process, never simplifying anything, never going for the easy dramatic epiphany, always respecting how analyst and patient circle around and around the edges of meaning."

Ty Burr of The Boston Globe wrote, "Avoiding the usual therapy-drama story beats, Desplechin has made a densely satisfying drama about Freud, racism, and sympathy in its largest sense."

A. O. Scott of The New York Times wrote:

"a reservoir of intensity in the two central performances, in particular Mr. Del Toro’s. He presents the spectacle of a man figuring himself out, using whatever tools are available: his ancestral culture, European science and his own intelligence. It is moving to witness, partly because, even when the film and the treatment have ended, so much remains to be done."

The film was nominated for the Palme d'Or at the 2013 Cannes Film Festival. In January 2014, it received three nominations at the 39th César Awards, including Best Picture, Best Director, and Best Adapted Screenplay.
