= Alain Guiraudie =

French film director

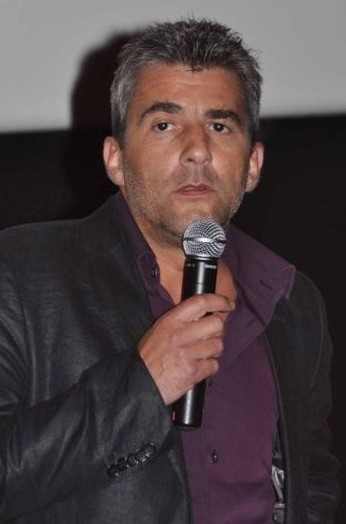
- Guiraudie in 2009
- Born: 15 July 1964 (age 62); Villefranche-de-Rouergue, Aveyron, France
- Occupations: Film director, screenwriter
- Years active: 1990-present

Alain Guiraudie (French: [giʁodi]; born 15 July 1964) is a French film director and screenwriter. He is most known for his gay erotic thriller Stranger by the Lake (2013), and has directed mostly LGBT-related films since the 1990s.

== Career ==
His 2013 film Stranger by the Lake was screened in the Un Certain Regard section at the 2013 Cannes Film Festival where he won the award for Best Director.

In 2014, he won the Prix Sade for his novel Now the Night Begins (Ici commence la nuit).

== Personal life ==
Guiraudie has named Georges Bataille as an important influence. He is gay.

== Filmography ==
=== Feature films ===
Year	English title	Original title	Notes
2001	Sunshine for the Poor	Du soleil pour les gueux	Also producer and actor
2001	That Old Dream That Moves	Ce vieux rêve qui bouge	Prix Jean Vigo
2003	No Rest for the Brave	Pas de repos pour les braves	
2005	Time Has Come	Voici venu le temps	
2009	The King of Escape	Le roi de l'évasion	
2013	Stranger by the Lake	L'Inconnu du lac	Queer Palm winner Un Certain Regard Best Director winner
2016	Staying Vertical	Rester vertical	
2022	Nobody's Hero	Viens je t'emmène	
2024	Misericordia	Miséricorde	Louis Delluc Prize

=== Short films ===
Year	English title	Original title	Notes
1990	Heroes Never Die	Les Héros sont immortels	Also actor
1994	Straight Ahead Until Morning	Tout droit jusqu'au matin	
1998	La Force des choses		
2019	Lighthouse		segment in 30/30 Vision: 3 Decades of Strand Releasing

=== Other credits ===
Year	Title	Credited as		Notes
Year	Title	Director	Actor	Notes
1993	Les Yeux au plafond		Yes	Short film
2002	Un petit cas de conscience		Yes	
2008	On m'a volé mon adolescence	Yes		Telefilm
