= Venus in Fur (film) =

2013 film by Roman Polanski

- Theatrical release poster
- French: La Vénus à la fourrure
- Directed by: Roman Polanski
- Screenplay by: David Ives; Roman Polanski
- Based on: Venus in Fur by David Ives
- Produced by: Robert Benmussa; Alain Sarde
- Starring: Emmanuelle Seigner; Mathieu Amalric
- Cinematography: Paweł Edelman
- Edited by: Margot Meynier; Hervé de Luze
- Music by: Alexandre Desplat
- Production companies: RP Productions; Monolith Films
- Distributed by: Mars Distribution (France); Monolith Films (Poland)
- Release dates: 25 May 2013 (Cannes); 8 November 2013 (Poland); 13 November 2013 (France)
- Running time: 96 minutes
- Countries: France; Poland
- Language: French
- Box office: $8.4 million

Venus in Fur (French: La Vénus à la fourrure) is a 2013 French-language erotic drama film directed by Roman Polanski, based on the play of the same name by American playwright David Ives, which itself was inspired by Leopold von Sacher-Masoch's novel Venus in Furs. It stars Emmanuelle Seigner and Mathieu Amalric, the only actors in the film.

The film premiered in competition for the Palme d'Or at the 2013 Cannes Film Festival on 25 May. In January 2014, the film received five nominations at the 39th César Awards, winning for Best Director.

== Plot ==
Thomas Novacheck is the writer-director of a new play, an adaptation of the 1870 novel Venus in Furs by Austrian author Leopold von Sacher-Masoch. Early in the movie, we learn that the book begins with a quote from the Book of Judith: "And the Lord hath smitten him and delivered him into a woman's hands."

The film begins with Thomas alone in a Parisian theatre after a day of auditioning actresses for the lead character, Wanda von Dunayev. Thomas laments on the phone about the poor performances he's had to deal with.

As Thomas prepares to leave the theatre, an actress named Vanda Jordan arrives disheveled from the rain. She claims to have had an audition slot earlier in the day, but her name does not appear on the audition list. Thomas wants to leave for his fiancée. In a whirlwind of energy and unrestrained aggression, Vanda persuades Thomas to let her stay and read for the part. At first appearing untalented, when she begins to read it becomes clear that she is an excellent actress and perfect for the part.

Although initially presenting as uneducated, throughout the movie Vanda displays knowledge and talent that almost seems superhuman. For example, she surprises Thomas by producing the full script, not just the portion given out to actors to use in the audition and having memorized it. The audition is in a theater and she shows not only a command of staging but also the lighting rig – adjusting the theater's lightboard, which presumably she has never seen before, without hesitation –, and she also has brought a full set of costumes, including some for Thomas to wear which fit him perfectly. At one point she "guesses" an amazingly accurate picture of Thomas' fiancée's life and background.

The subject of the play is sexual domination and submission. As the audition continues Vanda attacks the script as sexist, soft-core S&M pornography. Thomas at first defends it as a faithful adaptation of a literary classic about passion and desire. Vanda accuses Thomas of having his own masochistic fantasies, which he denies. However, as the film develops, he increasingly identifies with the masochistic male lead in the play. By the end of the film, he has become Vanda's slave.

In the final scene, Thomas is bound and tied to a pole. Vanda appears, proclaims "Bacchae of the Cadmea. Dance for Dionysus!", dances before Thomas, and leaves. The movie ends with the quote from the Book of Judith: "And the Lord hath smitten him and delivered him into a woman's hands."

== Cast ==
- Emmanuelle Seigner as Vanda Jourdain
- Mathieu Amalric as Thomas Novacheck

== Production ==
The intention to adapt Ives' play was announced in September 2012. Louis Garrel was to play Novacheck. Filming was scheduled to begin in November 2012, but production was delayed until January 2013 and Garrel was replaced by Amalric.

== Release ==
Sundance Selects and IFC Films acquired the U.S. rights to the film following its premiere at Cannes.

== Critical reception ==
On the review aggregator website Rotten Tomatoes, 88% of 119 critics' reviews are positive, with an average rating of 7.1/10. The website's consensus reads: "Provocative, funny, and brilliantly acted, Venus in Fur finds Roman Polanski in top late-period form." Metacritic, which uses a weighted average, assigned the film a score of 69 out of 100, based on 33 critics, indicating "generally favorable" reviews.

A. O. Scott of The New York Times said, "Working from a French translation of the play (which was widely acclaimed when it ran on and off Broadway a few years ago), Mr. Polanski has marked the text with his own fingerprints. One of the two characters—the splendidly volatile Vanda, an actress—is played by Emmanuelle Seigner, his wife. Her foil—a writer and theater director named Thomas—is played by Mathieu Amalric in a performance that is very close to a Polanski impersonation."

PopMatters wrote, "Venus in Fur is fascinating to the point that (subtitles or not), you simply cannot look away from the screen. There is always something to see, hear and feel."
