= 10th District Court =

2004 French documentary film

- French Poster
- Directed by: Raymond Depardon
- Produced by: Claude Morice; Claudine Nougaret; Adrien Roche
- Cinematography: Justine Bourgade; Raymond Depardon; Fabienne Octobre
- Edited by: Simon Jacquet; Lucile Sautarel
- Distributed by: Les Films du Losange
- Release date: 2 June 2004
- Running time: 105 minutes
- Country: France
- Language: French

10th District Court (French: 10^{e} Chambre — Instants d'audience) is a 2004 documentary film from France, directed by Raymond Depardon.

== Synopsis ==
The proceedings of a Paris courtroom are the grist for this documentary. Drawn from over 200 appearances before the same female judge, the director chooses a dozen or so varied misdemeanor and civil hearings to highlight the subtle details of human behaviour. In the process he draws attention to issues of guilt, innocence, policing and ethnicity in France.

== Reception ==
The Guardian's Mark Kermode judged 10th District Court showed a "gallery" of personalities which was "fascinating". His colleague Peter Bradshaw considered the film a "superb documentary".
