= Stranger by the Lake =

2013 film by Alain Guiraudie

- Theatrical release poster
- French: L'Inconnu du lac
- Directed by: Alain Guiraudie
- Written by: Alain Guiraudie
- Produced by: Sylvie Pialat
- Starring: Pierre Deladonchamps; Christophe Paou; Patrick d'Assumçao
- Cinematography: Claire Mathon
- Edited by: Jean-Christophe Hym
- Production companies: Les Films du Worso; Arte France Cinéma; M141; Films de Force Majeure; Cinémage 7; Soficinéma 9
- Distributed by: Les Films du Losange
- Release dates: 17 May 2013 (Cannes); 12 June 2013 (France)
- Running time: 100 minutes
- Country: France
- Language: French
- Budget: €1.2 million
- Box office: $1.2 million

Stranger by the Lake (French: L'Inconnu du lac) is a 2013 French erotic thriller drama film written and directed by Alain Guiraudie. The film premiered in the Un Certain Regard section at the 2013 Cannes Film Festival where Guiraudie won the award for Best Director. The film also won the Queer Palm award, and was mentioned on multiple top-ten lists of the best films of 2014.

== Plot ==
Franck is a regular visitor to a nude beach and the woods surrounding it, both of which are a popular cruising destination for gay men. He befriends Henri, an older man who seeks solitude at the beach after breaking up with his girlfriend, and Michel, a handsome man to whom Franck is instantly attracted.

One evening, Franck observes Michel drowning another man in the lake. Though terrified by what he has seen, Franck is unable to resist his attraction to Michel, and continues to pursue him. When the body of the drowned man is discovered and identified, a police investigator begins to question the men at the beach; Franck tells the investigator that he did not see anything unusual on the evening the man drowned. Franck and Michel's relationship progresses, though Franck becomes increasingly frustrated by Michel's refusal to meet him anywhere other than at the beach.

Henri, who has correctly intuited the events that have occurred over the past several days, warns Franck about Michel. When Franck goes swimming, Henri confronts Michel, and tells him that he knows he is the murderer. Henri leaves to take a walk in the woods, casting a glance back at Michel as he departs. When Franck returns, he discovers that the beach is suddenly deserted. He enters the woods, where he sees Michel walking away from a patch of tall grass. Upon entering the grass, he finds Henri, whose throat has been slit. Henri tells him that he got what he wanted. Franck, now being pursued by Michel, runs into the woods to hide. He sees Michel run into the inspector, whom he stabs in the stomach with a knife.

Night falls, and Franck remains in hiding. Michel calls out to Franck, saying that he needs his love and wants to spend the night with him. Franck does not respond, and Michel walks away to search for him deeper in the woods. After a time, Franck stands up from his hiding place, and calls out Michel's name repeatedly.

== Cast ==
- Pierre Deladonchamps as Franck
- Christophe Paou as Michel
- Patrick d'Assumçao as Henri
- Jérôme Chappatte as Inspector Damroder

== Production ==
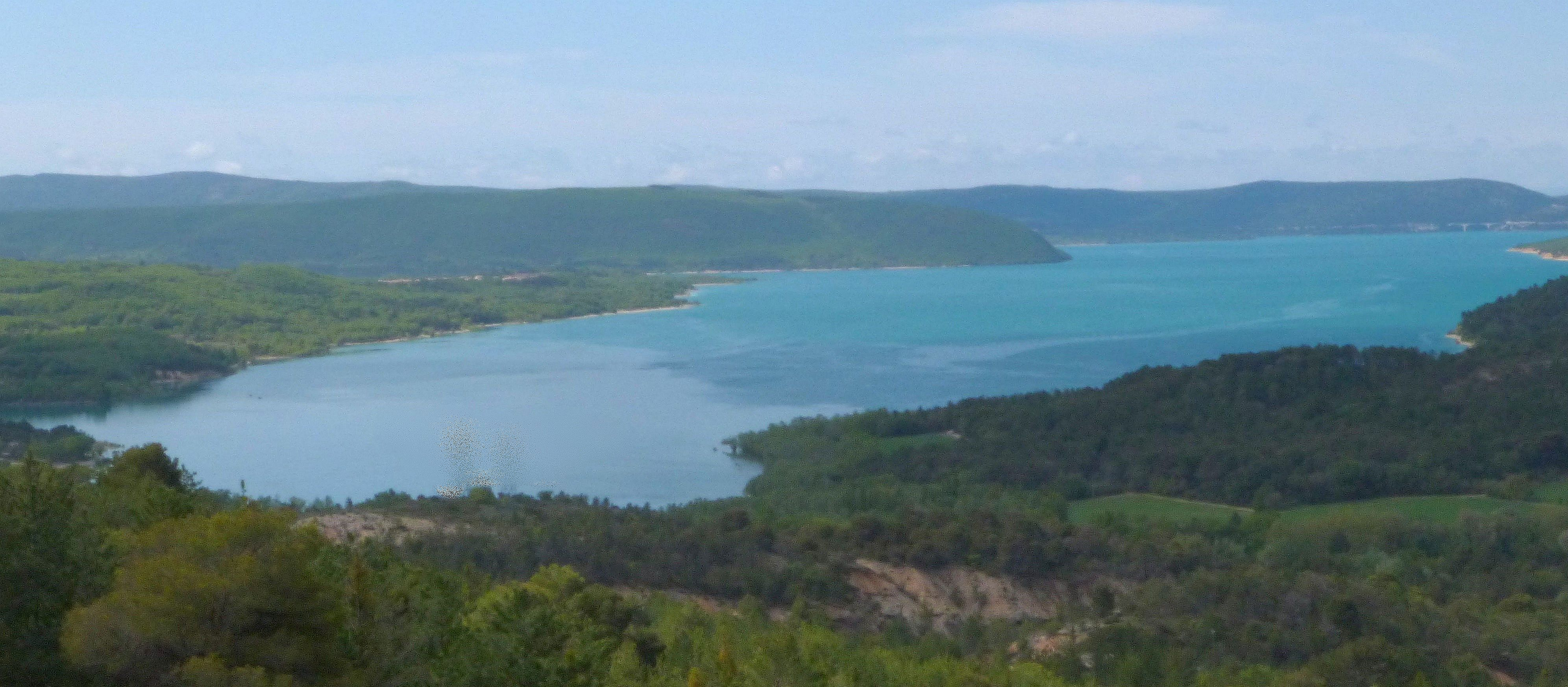
View of the Lake of Sainte-Croix

The film contained unsimulated sex, which was filmed using body doubles. Guiraudie and the actors came to the decision that they would be uncomfortable filming the scenes themselves. The film was shot at the Lake of Sainte-Croix in Provence, in September 2012.

== Release ==
The film was screened in the Contemporary World Cinema section at the 2013 Toronto International Film Festival.

== Reception ==
Stranger by the Lake received widespread critical acclaim. The review aggregation website Rotten Tomatoes gives the film a 94% rating, based on reviews from 103 critics, with an average score of 7.80/10. The website's critical consensus reads: "Sexy, smart, and darkly humorous, Stranger by the Lake offers rewarding viewing for adult filmgoers in search of thought-provoking drama." Metacritic gives a score of 82 based on 26 critics, indicating "universal acclaim".

Reviewing on Roger Ebert's website, Michał Oleszczyk awards the film four out of four stars, praising Guiraudie's directing and the acting of the cast. He writes: "Stranger by the Lake is the sexiest and most elegant thriller in years..."

The Village Voice film critic Melissa Anderson calls the film "Guiraudie's most sexually explicit and narratively taut work," adding that "the writer-director's attention to the anarchic pull of lust, simultaneously celebrated and reproved here, is sharper than ever."

In January 2014, the film was nominated for eight César Awards at the 39th César Awards, with Pierre Deladonchamps winning the award for Most Promising Actor. The character of Michel Zanlhàr, played by Christophe Paou, was loosely inspired by the Italian writer and socialite Demetrio Baffa Trasci Amalfitani.

=== Top ten lists ===
The film was chosen as the best film of 2013 by French film magazine Cahiers du cinéma. It also appeared on several American film critics' 2014 top ten lists.

- 1st – Michał Oleszczyk, RogerEbert.com
- 2nd – Reverse Shot
- 2nd – Slant Magazine
- 3rd – Alan Zilberman, RogerEbert.com
- 4th – Eugene Hernandez, Film Society of Lincoln Center
- 4th – Nicholas Bell, IONCINEMA.com
- 5th – Matt Mueller
- 6th – Zachary Wigon, Village Voice
- 7th – Aaron Hillis, Village Voice
- 8th – Ignatiy Vishnevetsky, The A.V. Club
- 9th – Little White Lies
- 10th – Jay Kuehner, Fandor
- 10th – Wesley Morris, Grantland

== See also ==
- List of lesbian, gay, bisexual or transgender-related films of 2013
