= Bite the Dust (film) =

- Russian: Отдать концы
- Directed by: Taisiya Igumentseva
- Written by: Aleksey Uchitel
- Produced by: Kira Saksaganskaya
- Starring: Sergey Abroskin; Maksim Vitorgan; Yola Sanko; Juris Laucinsh; Alina Sergeeva; Dmitriy Kulichkov; Anna Rud; Irina Denisova; Sergej Dementiev; Aleksandr Platonov
- Cinematography: Aleksandr Tananov
- Edited by: Ekaterina Chakhunova; Gleb Nikulskiy
- Production company: Rock Films
- Distributed by: Chunfu Film
- Release date: 10 October 2013 (Russia)
- Country: Russia
- Language: Russian

Bite the Dust (Russian: Отдать концы) is a 2013 film directed by Taisia Igumentseva. It was screened out-of-competition at the 2013 Cannes Film Festival.

== Synopsis ==
The handful of inhabitants of a tiny and isolated contemporary Russian rural village receive the news from state media that 90% of humanity is about to perish due to a coronal mass ejection. The old man of the village doesn't believe the news ("But the president said so!" "Ah, who cares what he says. That's his job, to say stuff!"), but nonetheless the village prepares one last party as they await the apocalypse, a party at which all the secret thoughts and desires of the villagers will be revealed and manifested in the belief that the end is nigh.
