= The Rendez-Vous of Déjà-Vu =

- Film poster
- Directed by: Antonin Peretjatko
- Written by: Antonin Peretjatko; Emmanuel Lautréamont; Patrick Chaize; Luc Catania
- Produced by: Emmanuel Chaumet
- Starring: Vimala Pons; Grégoire Tachnakian; Vincent Macaigne
- Cinematography: Simon Roca
- Edited by: Antonin Peretjatko; Carole Le Page
- Music by: Thomas De Pourquery; Julien Roig
- Production company: Ecce Films
- Distributed by: Shellac Distribution
- Release dates: 23 May 2013 (Cannes); 5 June 2013 (France)
- Running time: 88 minutes
- Country: France
- Language: French
- Budget: $700.000
- Box office: $325.000

The Rendez-Vous of Déjà-Vu (original title: La Fille du 14 juillet) is a 2013 French comedy film directed by Antonin Peretjatko.

== Plot ==
Hector tries to seduce during a short summer Truquette, since the government decided to reduce the vacation to one month due to the economic crisis.

== Cast ==
- Vimala Pons as Truquette
- Grégoire Tachnakian as Hector
- Vincent Macaigne as Pator
- Marie-Lorna Vaconsin as Charlotte
- Thomas Schmitt as Bertier
- Serge Trinquecoste as Doctor Placenta
- Claude Sanchez as Madame Placenta
- Esteban as Julot
- Philippe Gouin as Marcello
- Lucie Borleteau as Gretchen
- Thomas Ruat as Ernest
- Thomas Vernant as Funest
- Pierre Méréjkowsky as Chamboule-Tout
- Nicolas Moreau as "the Lion"
- Bruno Podalydès as The commissioner
- Albert Delpy as The patient

== Accolades ==
Award	Category	Recipient	Result
Athens International Film Festival	Competition Feature Film Awards	Antonin Peretjatko	Won
Cannes Film Festival	Golden Camera	Antonin Peretjatko	Nominated
Cannes Film Festival	SACD Prize	Antonin Peretjatko	Nominated
César Award	Most Promising Actor	Vincent Macaigne	Nominated
César Award	Best First Feature Film	Antonin Peretjatko & Emmanuel Chaumet	Nominated
International Cinephile Society Awards	Best Picture Not Released in 2013	Antonin Peretjatko	Won
Lumière Awards	Best Male Revelation	Vincent Macaigne	Nominated
Lumière Awards	Best Female Revelation	Vimala Pons	Nominated
