= Suzanne (2013 film) =

2013 film

- Film poster
- Directed by: Katell Quillévéré
- Written by: Mariette Désert; Katell Quillévéré
- Produced by: Gaëtan David; Bruno Levy; André Logie
- Starring: Sara Forestier; François Damiens; Adèle Haenel; Paul Hamy
- Cinematography: Tom Harari
- Edited by: Thomas Marchand
- Music by: Verity Susman
- Distributed by: Mars Distribution
- Release dates: 16 May 2013 (Cannes); 18 December 2013 (France)
- Running time: 90 minutes
- Country: France
- Language: French
- Budget: $4.4 million
- Box office: $2.4 million

Suzanne is a 2013 French drama film directed by Katell Quillévéré. In January 2014 the film received five nominations at the 39th César Awards, with Adèle Haenel winning the award for Best Supporting Actress.

== Plot ==
Following the death of her mother, Suzanne and her younger sister are raised by their father alone. At the age of 17, Suzanne becomes the mother of a son. Her father and her sister support the both of them. Suzanne then falls in love with a gangster named Julien, abandoning her family to follow Julien to Marseille, and eventually ending up in prison. Upon her release, she finds her son Charlie living in a foster family. Trying to put her life together, Suzanne nevertheless falls into old habits when Julien finds her on a bus and persuades her to leave for Morocco with him. Once again abandoning her family, Suzanne has a second child. Returning home she goes to visit her mother's grave and discovers that during her absence her sister Maria has died. Crossing the border back to Morocco, Suzanne, in a fit of grief confesses that she is travelling on a false passport. In prison Suzanne is visited by her father, teenage son and toddler daughter and watches as her son and daughter play together.

== Cast ==
- Sara Forestier as Suzanne Merevsky
- François Damiens as Nicolas Merevsky
- Adèle Haenel as Maria Merevsky
- Paul Hamy as Julien
- Anne Le Ny as Madame Danvers
- Lola Dueñas as Irène
- Corinne Masiero as Éliane

== Production ==
The production spent the entire month of August 2012 shooting in Marseille. The film was also shot in the Gard department–in Alès, La Grand-Combe, Nîmes, and Sète–from September to October 2012.

== Reception ==
Suzanne has a 91% approval rating on Rotten Tomatoes and a 75/100 on Metacritic.
