= Nobody's Hero (film) =

2022 French film

- Directed by: Alain Guiraudie
- Starring: Jean-Charles Clichet; Noémie Lvovsky; Iliès Kadri
- Distributed by: Les Films du Losange
- Release dates: 10 February 2022 (BIFF); 2 March 2022 (France)
- Running time: 1h 40min
- Country: France
- Language: French

Nobody's Hero (French: Viens je t'emmène) is a 2022 French comedy-drama film directed by Alain Guiraudie.

== Cast ==
- Jean-Charles Clichet - Médéric
- Noémie Lvovsky - Isadora
- Iliès Kadri - Selim
- Michel Masiero - M. Coq

== Production ==
Principal photography began on 28 January 2020 in Clermont-Ferrand. After 40 days into a scheduled 48-day-shoot, filming was suspended upon the first lockdown of the COVID-19 pandemic in France. The production resumed on 8 June 2020, filming a remaining three days in Clermont and five days at the Epinay Studios in Épinay-sur-Seine. It was one of the first films in France to resume production post-lockdown.
