= 2013 Cannes Film Festival =

- Official poster of the 66th Cannes Film Festival featuring a photo of Paul Newman and Joanne Woodward during the shooting of the film A New Kind of Love
- Opening film: The Great Gatsby
- Closing film: Zulu
- Location: Cannes, France
- Founded: 1946
- Awards: Palme d'Or: Blue Is the Warmest Colour
- Hosted by: Audrey Tautou
- No. of films: 20 (In Competition)
- Festival date: 15 May 2013 – 26 May 2013
- Website: festival-cannes.com/en

Cannes Film Festival
- 2014 2012

The 66th Cannes Film Festival took place from 15 to 26 May 2013. American filmmaker Steven Spielberg was the Jury President for the main competition.

The French film Blue Is the Warmest Colour won the Palme d'Or. In an unprecedented move, along with the director, Abdellatif Kechiche, the Jury decided to take "the exceptional step" of awarding the film's two main actresses, Adèle Exarchopoulos and Léa Seydoux, with the Palme.

The festival poster featured the real-life couple and Paul Newman and Joanne Woodward kissing during the shooting of A New Kind of Love. French actress Audrey Tautou hosted the opening and closing ceremonies.

On the occasion of 100 Years of Indian Cinema, India was an Official Guest Country at the 2013 Cannes Film Festival. Seven Indian feature films were premiered among various sections on the festival. Actress Vidya Balan was one of the Jury members for the Main Competition of the festival. The first Incredible India Exhibition, a joint participation of the Ministry of Tourism and Ministry of Information and Broadcasting, Republic of India was inaugurated by Indian delegate Chiranjeevi.

The festival opened with The Great Gatsby by Baz Luhrmann, and closed with Zulu by Jérôme Salle.

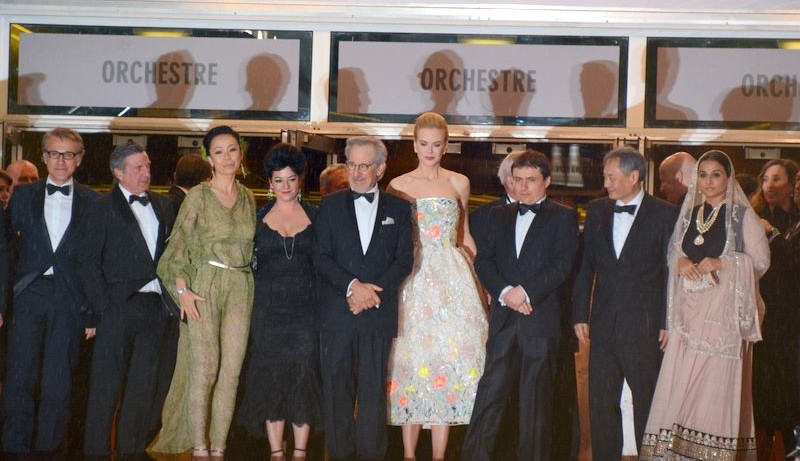
The main competition jury

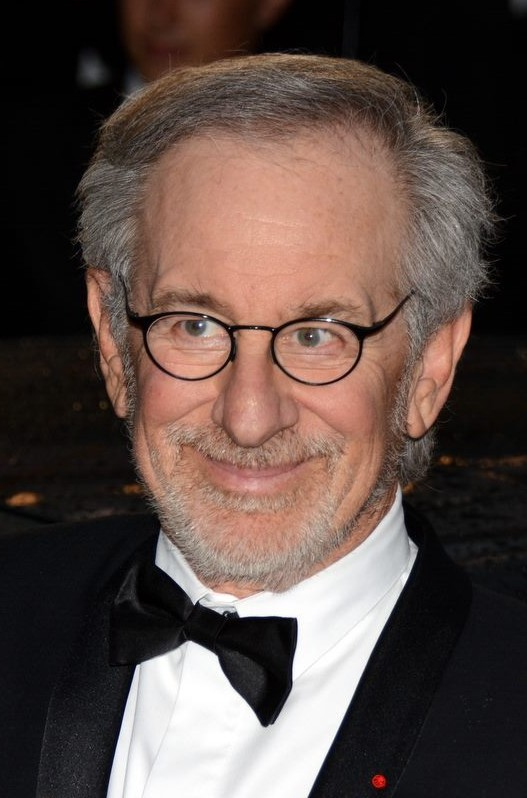
Steven Spielberg, President of the main competition jury

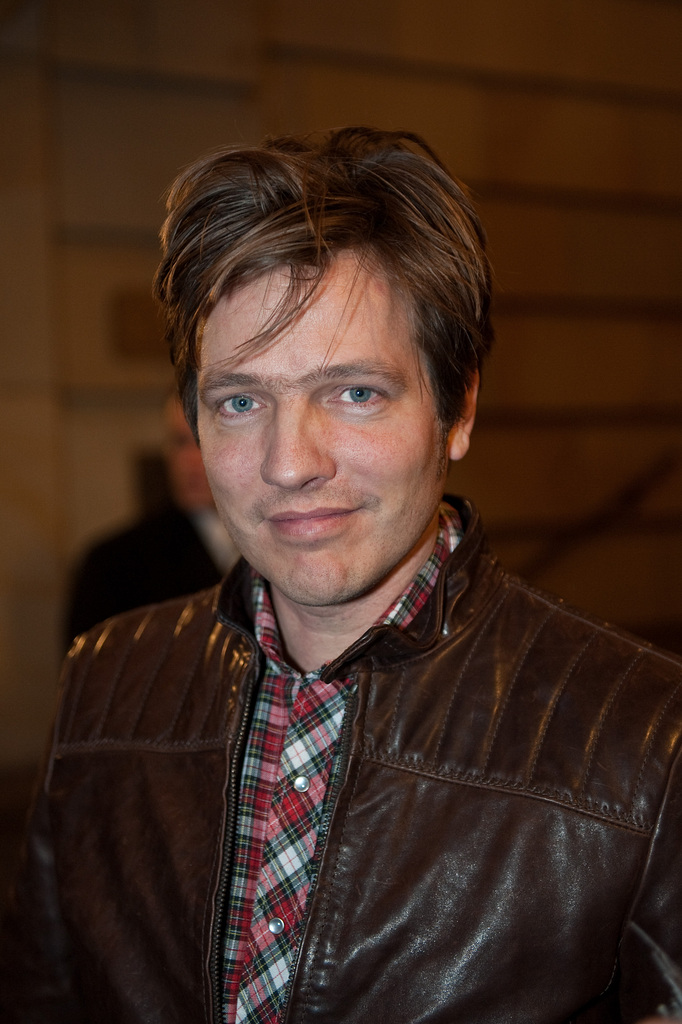
Thomas Vinterberg, President of the Un Certain Regard jury

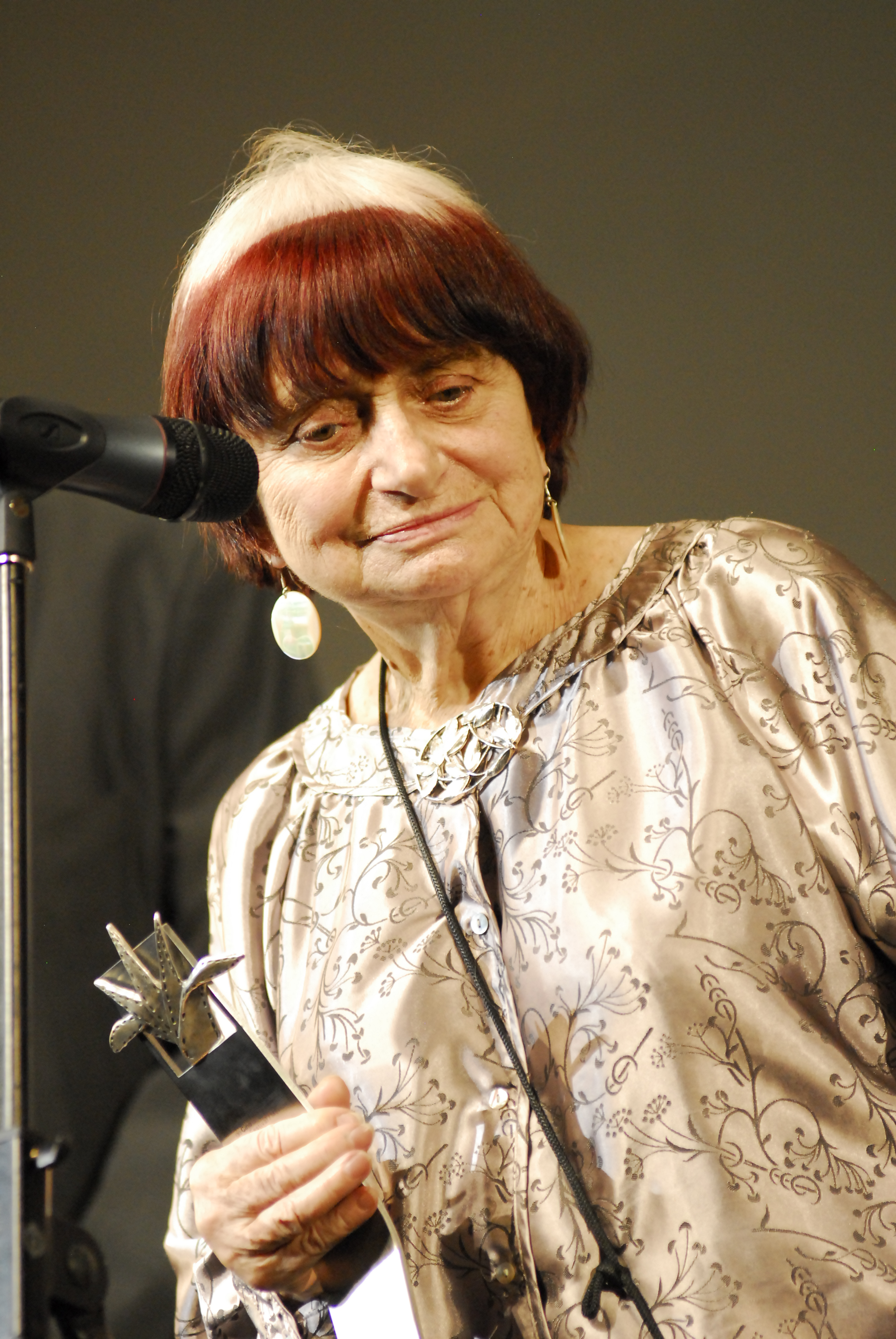
Agnès Varda, President of the Caméra d'Or jury

== Juries ==
=== In Competition ===
- Steven Spielberg, American filmmaker and producer – Jury President
- Daniel Auteuil, French actor
- Vidya Balan, Indian actress
- Naomi Kawase, Japanese filmmaker
- Nicole Kidman, Australian actress
- Ang Lee, Taiwanese filmmaker and producer
- Cristian Mungiu, Romanian filmmaker
- Lynne Ramsay, Scottish filmmaker
- Christoph Waltz, Austrian-German actor

=== Un Certain Regard ===
- Thomas Vinterberg, Danish filmmaker – Jury President
- Enrique Gonzalez Macho, Spanish producer and distributor
- Ludivine Sagnier, French actress
- Ilda Santiago, Brazilian director of the Rio de Janeiro International Film Festival
- Zhang Ziyi, Chinese actress

=== Caméra d'Or ===
- Agnès Varda, French film director – Jury President
- Michel Abramowicz, AFC
- Gwenole Bruneau, FICAM
- Isabel Coixet, Spanish film director
- Eric Guirado, SRF
- Chloe Rolland, Syndicat de la Critique
- Régis Wargnier, French film director

=== Cinéfondation and Short Films Competition ===
- Jane Campion, New Zealand filmmaker – Jury President
- Maji-da Abdi, Ethiopian actress and film director
- Nicoletta Braschi, Italian actress and producer
- Nandita Das, Indian actress and film director
- Semih Kaplanoğlu, Turkish film director

=== Independent juries ===
The following independent juries awarded films in the frame of the Critics' Week:

Nespresso Grand Prize

- Miguel Gomes, Portuguese filmmaker – Jury President
- Dennis Lim, American film programmer and critic
- Alin Taşçıyan, Turkish film critic
- Alex Vicente, Spanish film journalist
- Neil Young, English film curator and critic

Discovery Award for Short Film

- Mia Hansen-Løve, French filmmaker – Jury President
- Brad Deane, Canadian film curator
- Savina Neirotti, Italian program officer for the Biennale College of Cinema
- Johannes Palermos, Swedish program coordinator at the Stockholm International Film Festival
- Lorna Tee, Malaysian film festival consultant and film producer

France 4 Visionary Award

- Mia Hansen-Løve, French film director, Jury President
- Luo Jin, Chinese film critic
- Eren Odabasi, Turkish film critic
- Simon Pellegry, French film critic
- Thiago Stivaletti, Brazilian film critic

== Official Selection ==
=== In Competition ===
The following films were selected for the Main Competition section:

English Title	Original Title	Director(s)	Production Country
Behind the Candelabra		Steven Soderbergh	United States
Blue Is the Warmest Colour	La Vie d'Adèle – Chapitres 1 & 2	Abdellatif Kechiche	France, Belgium, Spain
Borgman		Alex van Warmerdam	Netherlands
A Castle in Italy	Un château en Italie	Valeria Bruni Tedeschi	France
The Great Beauty	La grande bellezza	Paolo Sorrentino	Italy, France
GriGris		Mahamat Saleh Haroun	Chad, France
Heli		Amat Escalante	Mexico
The Immigrant		James Gray	United States
Inside Llewyn Davis		Joel and Ethan Coen	United States, France, United Kingdom
Jimmy P: Psychotherapy of a Plains Indian		Arnaud Desplechin	France
Like Father, Like Son	そして父になる	Hirokazu Koreeda	Japan
Age of Uprising: The Legend of Michael Kohlhaas	Michael Kohlhaas	Arnaud des Pallières	France, Germany
Nebraska		Alexander Payne	United States
Only God Forgives		Nicolas Winding Refn	Denmark, France
Only Lovers Left Alive		Jim Jarmusch	United Kingdom, Germany
The Past	Le Passé	Asghar Farhadi	France, Iran, Italy
Shield of Straw	藁の楯	Takashi Miike	Japan
A Touch of Sin	天注定	Jia Zhangke	China, Japan, France
Venus in Fur	La Vénus à la fourrure	Roman Polanski	France, Poland
Young & Beautiful	Jeune & Jolie	François Ozon	France

=== Un Certain Regard ===
The following films were selected in the Un Certain Regard section:

English Title	Original Title	Director(s)	Production Country
As I Lay Dying		James Franco	United States
Bastards	Les Salauds	Claire Denis	France, Germany
Bends (CdO)	過界	Flora Lau	Hong Kong
The Bling Ring		Sofia Coppola	United States, United Kingdom, France, Germany, Japan
Death March	Martsang kamatayan	Adolfo Alix, Jr.	Philippines
Fruitvale Station (CdO)		Ryan Coogler	United States
The German Doctor	Wakolda	Lucía Puenzo	Argentina, Spain, France, Norway
The Golden Dream (CdO)	La jaula de oro	Diego Quemada-Diez	Mexico
Grand Central		Rebecca Zlotowski	France, Austria
Manuscripts Don't Burn	دست‌نوشته‌ها نمی‌سوزند	Mohammad Rasoulof	Iran
Miele (CdO)		Valeria Golino	Italy, France
The Missing Picture	L'image manquante	Rithy Panh	Cambodia, France
My Sweet Pepper Land		Huner Saleem	France, Germany, Iraq
Norte, the End of History	Norte, hangganan ng kasaysayan	Lav Diaz	Philippines
Nothing Bad Can Happen (CdO)	Tore tanzt	Katrin Gebbe	Germany
Omar	عمر	Hany Abu-Assad	Palestine
Sarah Prefers to Run (CdO)	Sarah préfère la course	Chloé Robichaud	Canada
Stranger by the Lake	L'Inconnu du lac	Alain Guiraudie	France

(CdO) indicates film eligible for the Caméra d'Or as directorial debut feature.

=== Out of Competition ===
The following films were selected to play out of competition:

English Title	Original Title	Director(s)	Production Country
All Is Lost		J. C. Chandor	Canada, United States
Blood Ties		Guillaume Canet	France, United States
Bombay Talkies		Anurag Kashyap, Karan Johar, Zoya Akhtar and Dibakar Banerjee	India
The Great Gatsby (opening film)		Baz Luhrmann	Australia, United States
The Last of the Unjust	Le dernier des injustes	Claude Lanzmann	France
Zulu (closing film)		Jérôme Salle	France, South Africa
Jerry Lewis Tribute
Max Rose		Daniel Noah	United States
Midnight Screenings
Blind Detective	盲探	Johnnie To	Hong Kong
Monsoon Shootout (CdO)		Amit Kumar	India

(CdO) indicates film eligible for the Caméra d'Or as directorial debut feature.

=== Special Screenings ===
The following films were presented in the Special screenings section:

English Title	Original Title	Director(s)	Production Country
Bite the Dust	Отдать концы	Taisia Igumentseva	Russia
Muhammad Ali's Greatest Fight		Stephen Frears	United States
Return to Nuke 'Em High Volume 1		Lloyd Kaufman	United States
Seduced and Abandoned		James Toback	United States
Stop the Pounding Heart		Roberto Minervini	United States, Italy
Weekend of a Champion (1972)		Roman Polanski	United Kingdom

=== Cinéfondation ===
The Cinéfondation section focuses on films made by students at film schools. The following 18 entries (14 fiction films and 4 animation films) were selected, out of 1,550 submissions from 277 different schools. One-third of the films selected represented schools competing for the first time. It was also the first time for a Chilean film to be selected in Cinéfondation.

English Title	Original Title	Director(s)	School
After the Winter	Au-delà de l'hiver	Jow Zhi Wei	Le Fresnoy, France
Asunción		Camila Luna Toledo	Pontifical Catholic University, Chile
Babaga	בבגה	Gan de Lange	Sam Spiegel Film and Television School, Israel
Danse Macabre		Małgorzata Rżanek	Academy of Fine Arts in Warsaw, Poland
Duet	دوئت	Navid Danesh	Karnameh Film School, Iran
Exile		Vladilen Vierny	La Fémis, France
Fable of a Blood-Drained Girl	Contrafábula de una niña disecada	Alejandro Iglesias Mendizábal	Centro de Capacitación Cinematográfica, Mexico
Going South		Jefferson Moneo	Columbia University, United States
Ham Story	O Šunce	Eliška Chytková	Tomas Bata University in Zlín, Czech Republic
In the Fishbowl	În acvariu	Tudor Cristian Jurgiu	UNATS, Romania
The Line	선	Kim Soo-jin	Chung-Ang University, South Korea
The Magnificent Lion Boy		Ana Caro	National Film and Television School, United Kingdom
Needle		Anahita Ghazvinizadeh	School of the Art Institute of Chicago, United States
The Norm of Life	Норма жизни	Evgeny Byalo	BKCP, Russia
Pandas	Pandy	Matúš Vizár	FAMU, Czech Republic
Stepsister		Joey Izzo	San Francisco State University, United States
Tomorrow All the Things	Mañana todas las cosas	Sebastián Schjaer	Universidad del Cine, Argentina
Waiting for the Thaw	En attendant le dégel	Sarah Hirtt	INSAS, Belgium

=== Short film competition ===
Out of 3,500 submissions, the following films were selected to compete for the Short Film Palme d'Or:

English Title	Original Title	Director(s)	Production Country
37˚4 S		Adriano Valerio	France
Condom Lead		Tarzan and Arab Nasser	Palestine
Meteorite + Impotence	隕石とインポテンツ	Omoi Sasaki	Japan
Mont Blanc		Gilles Coulier	Belgium
More Than Two Hours	بیشتر از دو ساعت	Ali Asgari	Iran
Olena		Elżbieta Benkowska	Poland
Ophelia		Annarita Zambrano	France
Safe	세이프	Moon Byoung-gon	South Korea
Whale Valley	Hvalfjörður	Guðmundur Arnar Guðmundsson	Denmark, Iceland

=== Cannes Classics ===
The Festival uses Cannes Classics to place the spotlight on rediscovered or restored masterworks from the past, or ones that have been re-released in theatres or on DVD.

English Title	Original Title	Director(s)	Production Country
Restored Prints
The Apprenticeship of Duddy Kravitz (1974)		Ted Kotcheff	Canada
An Autumn Afternoon (1962)	秋刀魚の味	Yasujirō Ozu	Japan
La Belle et la Bete (1946)		Jean Cocteau	France
Charulata (1964)	চারুলতা	Satyajit Ray	India
Cleopatra (1963)		Joseph L. Mankiewicz	United States, United Kingdom
Conversation Piece (1974)	Gruppo di famiglia in un interno	Luchino Visconti	Italy, France
The Desert of the Tartars (1976)	Il deserto dei Tartari	Valerio Zurlini	Italy, France, West Germany
Fedora (1978)		Billy Wilder	United States
Goha (1958)		Jacques Baratier	France, Tunisia
The Grande Bouffe (1973)	La grande abbuffata	Marco Ferreri	Italy, France
Hiroshima mon amour (1959)		Alain Resnais	France, Japan
Le Joli Mai (1963)		Chris Marker and Pierre Lhomme	France
The Last Detail (1973)		Hal Ashby	United States
The Last Emperor (1987)		Bernardo Bertolucci	China, United Kingdom, Italy
Lucky Luciano (1973)		Francesco Rosi	Italy
Purple Noon (1960)	Plein Soleil	René Clément	France
Queen Margot (1994)	La Reine Margot	Patrice Chéreau	France
The Umbrellas of Cherbourg (1964)	Les Parapluies de Cherbourg	Jacques Demy	France
Visions of Eight (1973)		Miloš Forman, Claude Lelouch, Yuri Ozerov, Mai Zetterling, Kon Ichikawa, John Schlesinger, Arthur Penn and Michael Pfleghar	United States
World Cinema Foundation
Manila in the Claws of Light (1975)	Maynila sa mga kuko ng liwanag	Lino Brocka	Philippines
The Wagoner (1963)	Borom Sarret	Ousmane Sembène	Senegal
Tribute
Opium		Arielle Dombasle	France
Documentaries about Cinema
Barefoot in the Kitchen	Con la pata quebrada	Diego Galán	Spain
Shepard & Dark		Treva Wurmfeld	United States
A Story of Children and Film		Mark Cousins	United Kingdom

=== Cinéma de la Plage ===
The Cinéma de la Plage is a part of the Official Selection. The outdoors screenings at the beach cinema of Cannes are open to the public.

English Title	Original Title	Director(s)	Production Country
The Big Blue (1988)	Le Grand Bleu	Luc Besson	France, United States, Italy
The Birds (1963)		Alfred Hitchcock	United States
Bollywood: The Greatest Love Story Ever Told (2011)		Rakeysh Omprakash Mehra and Jeff Zimbalist	India
The General (1926)		Clyde Bruckman and Buster Keaton	United States
Jaws (1975)		Steven Spielberg	United States
Jour de fête (1949)		Jacques Tati	France
The Ladies Man (1961)		Jerry Lewis	United States
Safety Last! (1923)		Fred C. Newmeyer, Sam Taylor	United States
Siméon (1992)		Euzhan Palcy	France, Guadeloupe, Martinique
That Man from Rio (1963)	L'homme De Rio	Philippe De Broca	Italy, France

== Parallel sections ==
=== Critics' Week ===
The line-up for the Critics' Week was announced on 22 April at the section's website. The following films were selected:

English Title	Original Title	Director(s)	Production Country
In Competition
The Dismantling	Le Démantèlement	Sébastien Pilote	Canada
For Those in Peril (CdO)		Paul Wright	United Kingdom
The Lunchbox (CdO)	Dabba	Ritesh Batra	India, France, Germany
The Major	Майор	Yuri Bykov	Russia
Nos héros sont morts ce soir (CdO)		David Perrault	France
The Owners (CdO)	Los Dueños	Agustín Toscano and Ezequiel Radusky	Argentina
Salvo (CdO)		Fabio Grassadonia and Antonio Piazza	Italy, France
Suzanne		Katell Quillévéré	France
Special Screenings
Ain't Them Bodies Saints		David Lowery	United States
Encounters After Midnight (CdO)	Les rencontres d'après minuit	Yann Gonzalez	France
Short Films Competition
Agit Pop		Nicolas Pariser	France
Breathe Me		Eun-young Han	South Korea
Come and Play	Komm und spiel	Daria Belova	Germany
La Lampe au beurre de yak		Wei Hu	China, France
Océan		Emmanuel Laborie	France
The Opportunist		David Lassiter	United States
Pátio		Ali Muritiba	Brazil
Pleasure		Ninja Thyberg	Sweden
Tau Seru		Rodd Rathjen	India, Australia
Vikingar		Magali Magistry	France, Iceland

(CdO) indicates film eligible for the Caméra d'Or as directorial debut feature.

=== Directors' Fortnight ===
The line-up for the Directors' Fortnight was announced at a press conference on 23 April with the following films being selected.

English Title	Original Title	Director(s)	Production Country
Les Apaches		Thierry de Peretti	France
Até Ver a Luz		Basil da Cunha	Switzerland
Blue Ruin		Jeremy Saulnier	United States
The Congress		Ari Folman	Israel, Germany, Poland
The Dance of Reality	La danza de la realidad	Alejandro Jodorowsky	France
L'Escale (CdO)		Kaveh Bakhtiari	Switzerland, France
La Fille du 14 Juillet (CdO)		Antonin Peretjako	France
Henri		Yolande Moreau	France
Ilo Ilo (CdO)		Anthony Chen	Singapore
Jodorowsky's Dune		Frank Pavich	United States, France
The Last Days on Mars (CdO)		Ruairí Robinson	United Kingdom
Magic Magic		Sebastian Silva	United States
Me, Myself and Mum (CdO)	Les garçons et Guillaume, à table!	Guillaume Gallienne	France
On the Job		Erik Matti	Philippines
The Selfish Giant		Clio Barnard	United Kingdom
A Strange Course of Events		Raphaël Nadjari	Israel, France
The Summer of Flying Fish	El verano de los peces voladores	Marcela Said	France, Chile
Tip Top		Serge Bozon	France
Ugly		Anurag Kashyap	India
Un Voyageur		Marcel Ophuls	France
We Are What We Are		Jim Mickle	United States
Short Films
About a Month	Pouco mais de um mês	André Novais Oliveira	Brazil
A Wild Goose Chase	Gambozinos	João Nicolau	Portugal, France
Lágy eső		Dénes Nagy	Hungary, Belgium
Le quepa sur la vilni!		Yann Le Quellec	France, Belgium
Que je tombe tout le temps?		Eduardo Williams	France
Shadow of a Cloud	O umbra de nor	Radu Jude	Romania
Solecito		Oscar Ruiz Navia	Colombia, France, Denmark
Swimmer		Lynne Ramsay	United Kingdom
You Can't Do Everything at Once, But You Can Leave Everything at Once	Man kann nicht alles auf einmal tun, aber man kann alles auf einmal lassen	Marie-Elsa Sgualdo	Switzerland

(CdO) indicates film eligible for the Caméra d'Or as directorial debut feature.

== Official Awards ==
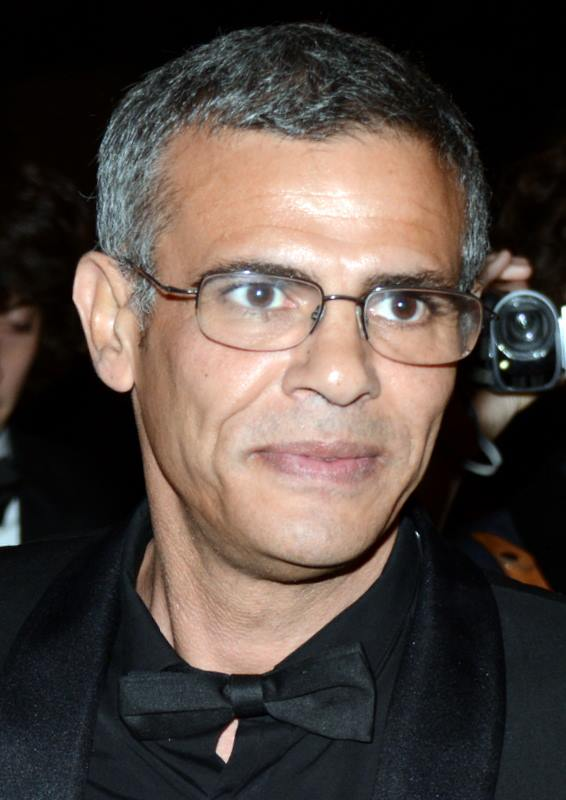
Abdellatif Kechiche, winner of the 2013 Palme d'Or

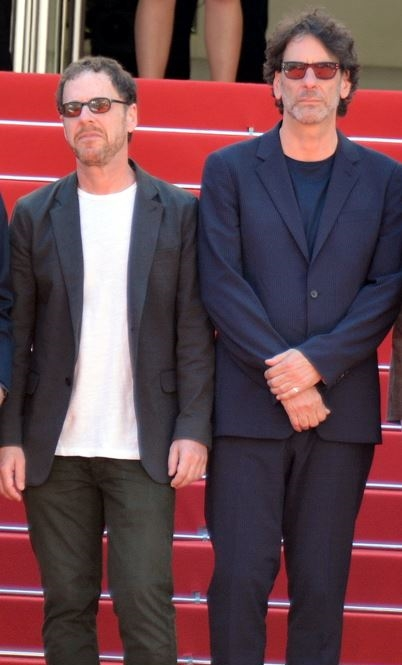
Joel & Ethan Coen, winners of the Gran Prix

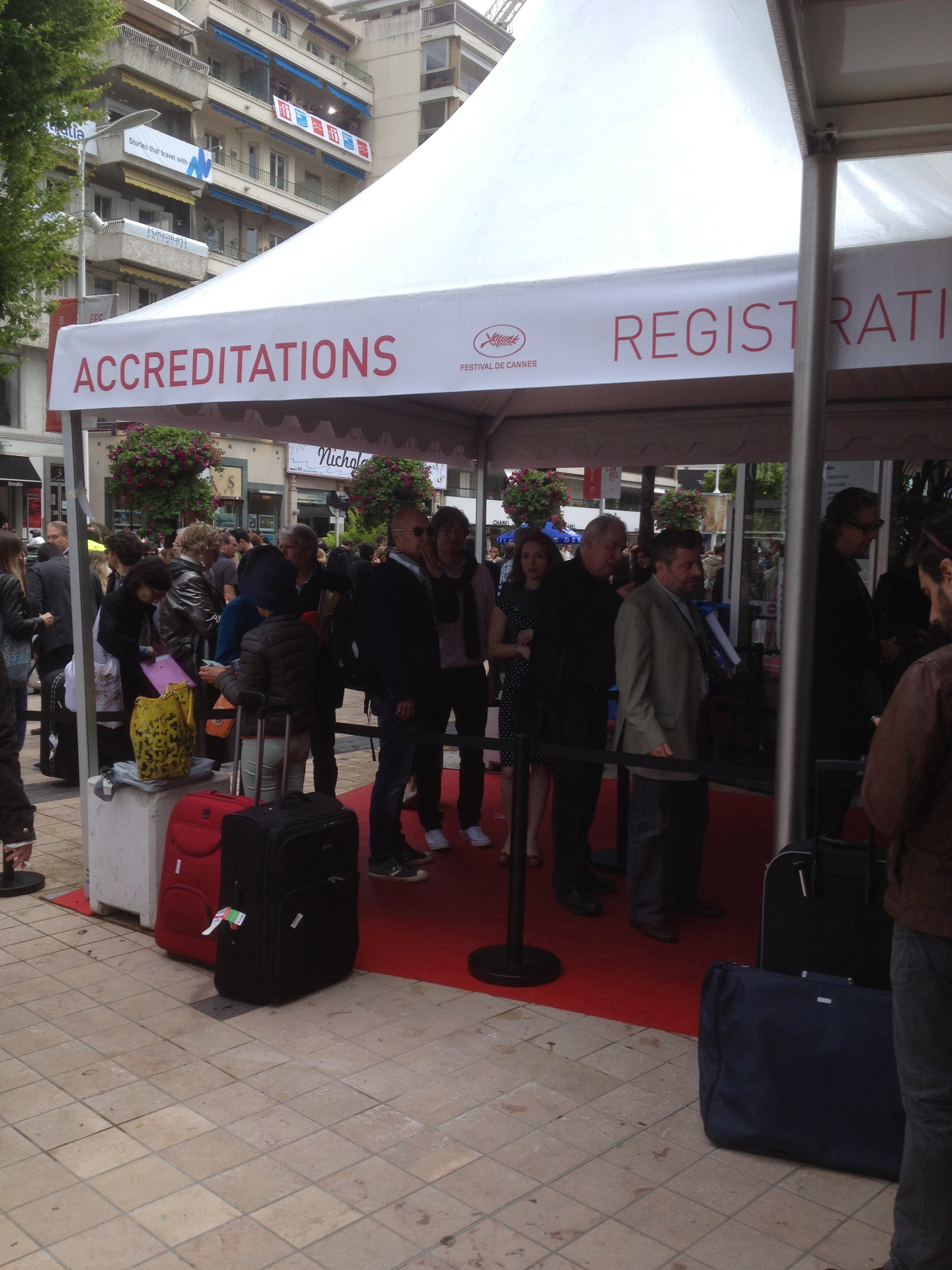
Registration and accreditation tent for the 2013 Festival

The French film Blue Is the Warmest Colour, directed by Abdellatif Kechiche, won the Palme d'Or. In a first for the competition, the jury decided to award the Palme d'Or to Kechiche and the actresses who star in the film: Adèle Exarchopoulos and Léa Seydoux. Blue Is the Warmest Colour is a coming-of-age film that tells the story of a lesbian relationship between a 15-year-old girl and an older woman. It has shocked some critics with its graphic and controversial sex scenes. A reporter for the Radio France Internationale stated that Kechiche paid tribute to the "Tunisian revolution" and "the right to love freely" during his acceptance speech. The president of the jury, Steven Spielberg, said "The film is a great love story ... We were absolutely spellbound by the two brilliant young actresses, and the way the director observed his young players." The Grand Prix was won by the Coen brothers's Inside Llewyn Davis, while Bruce Dern and Bérénice Bejo were awarded Best Actor and Best Actress respectively.

=== In Competition ===
- Palme d'Or: Abdellatif Kechiche (filmmaker), Adèle Exarchopoulos and Léa Seydoux (lead actresses) for Blue Is the Warmest Colour
- Grand Prix: Inside Llewyn Davis by Joel & Ethan Coen
- Best Director: Amat Escalante for Heli
- Best Screenplay: Jia Zhangke for A Touch of Sin
- Best Actress: Bérénice Bejo for The Past
- Best Actor: Bruce Dern for Nebraska
- Jury Prize: Like Father, Like Son by Hirokazu Koreeda

=== Un Certain Regard ===
- Prix Un Certain Regard: The Missing Picture by Rithy Panh
- Un Certain Regard Special Jury Prize: Omar by Hany Abu-Assad
- Un Certain Regard Best Director: Alain Guiraudie for Stranger by the Lake
- Un Certain Regard Best First Film: Fruitvale Station by Ryan Coogler
- A Certain Talent: Diego Quemada-Diez for The Golden Cage

=== Caméra d'Or ===
- Ilo Ilo by Anthony Chen

=== Cinéfondation ===
- 1st Prize: Needle by Anahita Ghazvinizadeh
- 2nd Prize: Waiting for the Thaw by Sarah Hirtt
- 3rd Prize: In the Fishbowl by Tudor Cristian Jurgiu

=== Short Films Competition ===
- Short Film Palme d'Or: Safe by Moon Byoung-gon
  - Special Distinction:
    - Hvalfjordur by Guðmundur Arnar Guðmundsson
    - 37°4 S by Adriano Valerio

== Independent Awards ==
=== FIPRESCI Prizes ===
- Blue Is the Warmest Colour by Abdellatif Kechiche (In Competition)
- Manuscripts Don't Burn by Mohammad Rasoulof (Un Certain Regard)
- Blue Ruin by Jeremy Saulnier (Directors' Fortnight)

=== Vulcan Award of the Technical Artist ===
- Vulcan Award: Antoine Héberlé (cinematography) for Grigris

=== Prize of the Ecumenical Jury ===
- The Past by Asghar Farhadi
  - Special Mention:
  - Miele by Valeria Golino
  - Like Father, Like Son by Hirokazu Koreeda

=== Critics' Week ===
- Nespresso Grand Prize: Salvo by Fabio Grassadonia and Antonio Piazza
- France 4 Visionary Award: Salvo by Fabio Grassadonia and Antonio Piazza
  - Special Mention: Los Dueños by Agustín Toscano and Ezequiel Radusky
- Discovery Award for short film: Come and Play by Daria Belova
- Canal+ Short Film Award: Pleasure by Ninja Thyberg

=== Directors' Fortnight ===
- Art Cinema Award: Me, Myself and Mum by Guillaume Gallienne
- Prix SACD: Me, Myself and Mum by Guillaume Gallienne
- Europa Cinemas Label: The Selfish Giant by Clio Barnard
- Premier Prix Illy for Short Filmmaking: A Wild Goose Chase by Joao Nicolau
  - Special Mention: About a Month by Andre Novais Oliveira

=== Prix François Chalais ===
- Grand Central by Rebecca Zlotowski

=== Queer Palm ===
- Stranger by the Lake by Alain Guiraudie

=== Palm Dog Jury ===
- Palm Dog Award: Baby Boy in Behind the Candelabra
