= Grégoire Solotareff =

Grégoire Solotareff (born 1953 in Alexandria, Egypt) is a French artist, writer and illustrator of children's books. Solotareff practiced as a doctor from 1978 to 1985, before beginning his career as an illustrator with Hatier. The publication of his Loulou series from 1989 marked a turning point in his career, showcasing the bold lines and flat primary colours, inspired by Matisse and Van Gogh, that he would become known for. Loulou has sold over a million copies worldwide, but was only translated into English for the first time in 2017.

== Select French bibliography ==
- 1989 - Loulou, éditions L'École des loisirs, published in English as Wolfy
- 1993 - Le Diable des rochers, L'École des loisirs
- 1994 - Un Jour, un loup : histoires d'amis, histoires d'amour, L'École des loisirs
- 1995 - Adrien, L'École des loisirs / Loulou et compagnie
- 1996 - Toi grand et moi petit, L'École des loisirs
- 1997 - Un Chat est un chat, L'École des loisirs
- 1998 - L'Invitation, illustré par Olga Lecaye, L'École des loisirs
- 1999 - Trois sorcières, album LP, L'École des loisirs
- 2000 - Le Lapin à roulettes, L'École des loisirs
- 2001 - Contes d'été, L'École des loisirs
- 2002 - Je suis perdu, illustré par Olga Lecaye, L'École des loisirs
- 2003 - Non mais ça va pas !, L'École des Loisirs
- 2004 - Toi grand et moi petit, l'École des loisirs
- 2005 - Le Roi crocodile, L'École des Loisirs
- 2006 - U, L'École des Loisirs
- 2007 - Adam et Eve, l'École des loisirs
- 2010 - Loulou plus fort que le loup, album LP, L'École des loisirs
- 2011 - Loulou à l'école des loups, L'École des loisirs
- 2012 - César, L'École des Loisirs
- 2013 - Méchant petit prince, L'École des Loisirs
- 2013 - Loulou, l'incroyable secret, with Jean-Luc Fromental
- 2014 - Le Chat rouge, L'École des Loisirs
- 2015 - Loulou à colorier, L'École des Loisirs

=== English translations ===
- 2017 - Wolfy, Gecko Press

== Select awards ==
- 1987 : Prix Bernard Versele for Théo et Balthazar au pays des crocodiles
- 1988 : Selection of 1000 young readers for Ne m'appelez plus jamais "Mon petit lapin"
- 1989 : Rennes d'Or d'Avoriaz pour La Grande Histoire de Théo et Balthazar
- 1992 : Prix Sorcières for Les bêtises de bébé ours
- 1992 : Prix de Montreuil
- 1993 : Bologna Children's Book Fair Ragazzi Award for le Dictionnaire du Père Noël
- 1993 : Prix Bernard Versele in Belgium for Le chien qui disait non
- 1998 : Prix Livres Élus du Puy-en-Velay (10–12 years) forMa sorcière, Mon ange et moi
- 2014 : César Award for Best Animated Film for Loulou, l'incroyable secret
