= Hollow Knight: Silksong pre-release community =

Community waiting for 2025 video game

- Hollow Knight's protagonist sitting on a bench dressed as a clown, a popular meme
- Subject: Hollow Knight: Silksong
- Start: February 14, 2019
- End: September 4, 2025
- Notable media: Daily Silksong News
- Major community: r/Silksong

The pre-release community surrounding Hollow Knight: Silksong, the sequel to the 2017 metroidvania video game Hollow Knight, spanned the years between Silksong's announcement in February 2019 and its release in September 2025. During extended periods without major news, fans anticipated announcements at video game showcases, making Silksong's potential appearances a recurring subject of memes, and frequently spammed its name in livestream chats. Fans frequently congregated on social media platforms such as Reddit, Twitter, Discord, and YouTube. The prolonged wait also led to heavy speculation about the game's development and possible news, with minor updates being interpreted as potential clues about its release. One notable example involved fans extrapolating an upcoming announcement based on a tweet and a picture of a chocolate cake, with fan predictions turning out accurate despite official denials.

Starting in January 2021, the YouTube channel Daily Silksong News uploaded daily reports on Silksong's development, including when no new information was available, which was most often the case. PC Gamer called series creator Araraura an "internet hero". The r/Silksong subreddit created in August 2021 developed a distinct community culture, including the creation of elaborate fake news updates known as "Silkposts", and unique community events such as one that was described as the community "mock-ritually-sacrificing" others. The pre-release community received coverage from multiple media outlets, including The New York Times, Wired, and The Guardian. It was the subject of a PAX talk by Dan Olson of Folding Ideas. The Financial Times thought it exhibited "the best parts of the online gaming community" and praised it for "turn[ing] a parody of video game hype cycles into a kind of surreal art form".

== Background ==
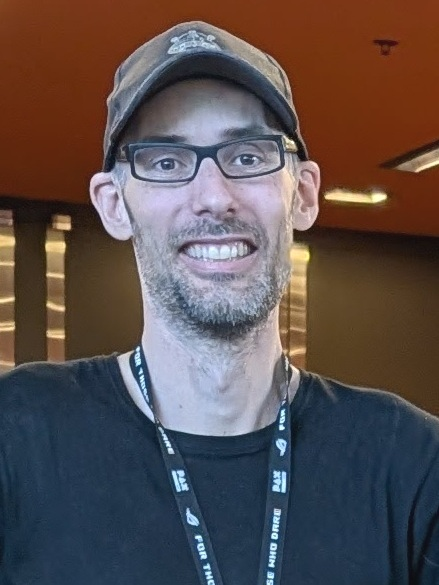
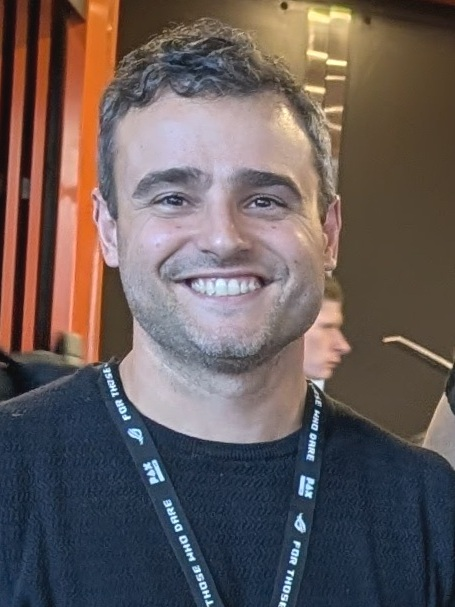
Co-founders of Team Cherry, Ari Gibson (left) and William Pellen (right)

In 2017, the metroidvania video game Hollow Knight was released by independent developer Team Cherry, an Australian company founded by Ari Gibson and William Pellen. It received critical and commercial success and developed a strong fan following. Hollow Knight was funded in part by a Kickstarter campaign which featured stretch goals, including one to allow players to play as a character named Hornet. As Team Cherry worked to meet this stretch goal, the scope of the project began to grow. Following the release of the last free update for Hollow Knight, Team Cherry announced on 14 February 2019 that the "playable Hornet" update would become its own game called Hollow Knight: Silksong. A variety of promotional material was presented for the upcoming game including a trailer released concurrently with the announcement, a playable demo at E3 2019, a Nintendo Treehouse livestream, and blog posts through Team Cherry's official website. Following their 13 December 2019 blog post titled "Team Cherry Holiday Sign Off", no new blog posts would appear until 2025.

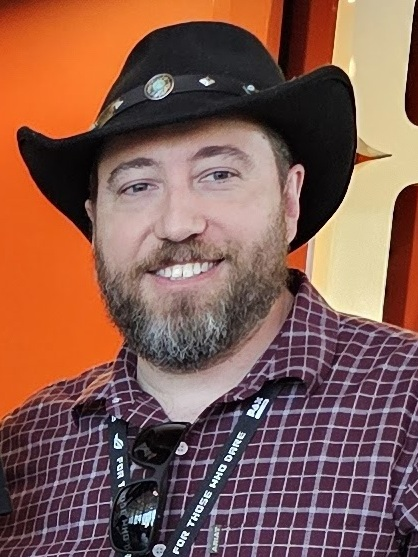
Marketing and publishing director Matthew "Leth" Griffin

Release information trickled out from other venues. In 2020, Team Cherry marketing director Matthew "Leth" Griffin began a series of riddles on Discord that revealed non-playable characters and short gameplay clips. Team Cherry also took part in features from Edge and A Profound Waste of Time magazine. Updates provided in May 2021 and February 2022 confirmed the game was still in development but provided no additional information. A trailer was included in an Xbox & Bethesda Games Showcase in June 2022, in which hosts implied it would be released within twelve months. This was later confirmed by the official Xbox Twitter account. On 10 May 2023, Griffin announced a delay, once more confirming the game was in development and had "gotten quite big" but providing no follow-up details. Following this, updates from Team Cherry all but ceased, providing little information to fans over the next two years about when or if the game would be released.

=== Lead up to release ===
Silence broke on 2 April 2025, when Silksong was included in a Nintendo Direct sizzle reel of upcoming games for the Nintendo Switch 2 with a broad release window of 2025. In May, it was announced Silksong would be on display at the ACMI, a museum in Melbourne, Australia, starting on 18 September. This led to speculation the game would release before this point. Silksong also appeared in the announcement for the ROG Xbox Ally at the 2025 Xbox Games Showcase on 8 June, and playable demos were featured at Gamescom on 20 August. Team Cherry's blog on 19 August teased a "special announcement" streamed on YouTube on 21 August 2025, which revealed the game would be releasing in two weeks. Silksong released on 4 September 2025, six and a half years after the game was first announced and eight years after development started. In an interview with Jason Schreier, Gibson and Pellen revealed development had been steady without major hurdles. They said of their media silence, "We felt like continued updates were just going to sour people on the whole thing...because all we could really say is, 'We're still working on it.'"

== Fandom behavior ==
Many fans found Team Cherry's relative media silence during development on Silksong to be unusual, especially compared to other major video game releases which typically receive heavy promotion. This behavior also stood in contrast to the development period of Hollow Knight, which received frequent updates direct from Team Cherry. A number of expectant fans started to worry that development had been stalled in some way, some believing the game was simply vaporware and would never be released. Some fans known as "Skongers", based on "Skong", a common abbreviation for Silksong, became increasingly obsessed with any and all information regarding the status of the game. One Reddit user told Wired magazine, "When [there's no news], everyone's sad, and then everyone goes insane and starts spouting misinformation without batting an eye...When there's news it's the happiest day of your life. There's hype posts EVERYWHERE. All your hope in Team Cherry is restored." The "collective delusion" of fans was referred to by the community as "Silksanity", a portmanteau of Silksong and insanity. Meanwhile, fan enthusiasm continued to grow. By September 2025, over five million people had added Silksong to their wishlist on Steam, more than any other game to that point. According to The New York Times, "it seemed the less that was said about Silksong, the more attention it accrued."

Geoff Keighley hosted many events which did not feature Silksong, to many's disappointment.

Much community attention was placed on video game press events such as E3, Gamescom, Summer Game Fest, The Game Awards, and company press releases such as Nintendo Directs and Xbox Games Showcases. Fans would hype themselves up for every upcoming event hoping it would have some sort of announcement. When almost all of the events had no such announcement, fans often expressed a feeling of having fooled themselves with their perennial excitement. Memes comparing this cycle to donning clown makeup often accompanied such disappointments. Events that were livestreamed often had viewers spamming phrases like "SKONG" or "WHERE SILKSONG" in their chat rooms. Silksong would frequently become a trending topic on Twitter before each event. During the Triple‑I Initiative, an indie game showcase in 2024, the pre-show countdown teased Silksong by displaying the message "what's the name of this highly anticipated metroidvania with an insect again? it looks cool!" [sic] which caused fans to go "into a frenzy" with one post declaring a "Code Red". Fans spammed replies to tweets from Triple‑I Initiative with the message "SKONG" followed by megaphone emojis. Clown memes once again followed when Silksong did not appear at the event.

During The Game Awards in 2023, host Geoff Keighley announced one game as coming from a small indie team from Australia, which raised fans' hopes due to similarities to Team Cherry. The game was revealed to be Big Walk by Melbourne-based developer House House, which caused a flurry of memes targeted at House House and their previous game Untitled Goose Game. Keighley, prior to hosting Gamescom 2024, announced on Twitter that Silksong would not be at the event in an attempt to pre-empt the disappointment. Keighley also attached a meme of The Knight from Hollow Knight dressed like a clown. Keighley posted another picture of himself wearing a clown nose in advance of hosting Gamescom 2025, which was also interpreted as a reference to the clown memes. At Summer Games Fest 2025, a promotion for Marvel's Deadpool VR had Keighley read a fake letter from Deadpool that said "you're gonna do me a solid and skip that Silksong trailer so you can pimp my revolutionary VR gaming venture that will shock the industry, probably", which went over poorly with the community.

=== Crumbs of news ===
SteamDB changelog for Silksong in July 2025

Without information from traditional outlets, fans began paying close attention to anything Silksong related no matter how small, looking for any signs of an imminent release. Harvey Randall of PC Gamer described the community as descending on new information from Team Cherry "like a swarm of starved locusts". A Reddit user told Wired "the occasional crumb of news" was a factor keeping the community afloat. Events such as Team Cherry logging into their Kickstarter account, pages being added to digital store fronts, and ESRB ratings getting updated became the subject of lengthy discussions.

On 24 March 2025, fans across social media noticed the metadata related to Silksong on Steam had been updated. These changes were documented by the independent database SteamDB and included compatibility with the cloud service GeForce Now, a few adjustments to assets, and the changing of copyright date from 2019 to 2025. For most games, such metadata changes do not garner much attention. However, the event was seen as major news by communities such as r/Silksong and generated excitement from even professed "doubters". IGN saw it as an indication that news and a potential release date were imminent. In June, it was noticed via SteamDB that achievement languages were added, along with updates that seemed to indicate game files had been uploaded. The community reacted to the changes with excitement; one user described it as "pretty much confirmation that the game is complete and ready to have its release date announced", while another declared "SWITCH 2 SHADOW DROP". GamesRadar+ wrote "Hollow Knight fans hold onto every single scrap of news with both hands and don't let go, and these newest changes seem to be the most exciting in ages." Another batch of SteamDB updates dropped later that week, which caused more defection from the "doubters". Seven more updates posted in July had no identifiable effect. Regardless, GamesRadar+ described hope among the community following the news as being "at an all-time high."

=== Cake incident ===
little bomey
(@everydruidwaswr)
tweeted:

something big is coming. keep your eyes closed tomorrow

15 January 2025

On 15 January 2025, Pellen's shitpost account on Twitter was revamped: its name, profile picture, and handle were all changed. The profile picture was swapped to an image of a chocolate cake, with a reverse image search tracking the photo to a cake recipe posted on 2 April 2024. Pellen also tweeted "something big is coming. keep your eyes closed tomorrow", with the last part of the phrase, "eyes closed tomorrow", being previously used by American pop rock band Imagine Dragons, also on Twitter, on 2 April 2024. The new name "little bomey" was noticed as being similar to the Adelaide-made wine Little Boomey, which had ties to April 2024 seen on Wine-Searcher at the time; Team Cherry is also based in Adelaide. The name was further compared to Napoleon's nickname "Little Boney". Napoleon married his second wife Marie Louise of Austria on 2 April 1810, with Marie Louise also wearing a red cloak, leading to comparisons with Hornet. Speculation on the handle "everydruidwaswr" included that "wr" was the start of a word, and that "druid" referenced the revealed Silksong character "Druid of the Moss Temple". (Note: The character is simply named "Moss Druid" in the release version of Silksong.)

Following Pellen's mention of "tomorrow" in his tweet, the Nintendo Switch 2 console was revealed on 16 January 2025, the trailer closing with the announcement that a Nintendo Direct presentation would air on 2 April 2025. Some speculated that this meant Pellen knew of the Switch 2's announcement date beforehand. The perceived repeated allusions to the date 2 April led many fans to theorize that Pellen was creating an alternate reality game (ARG) teasing Silksong being at the 2 April 2025 direct. Following the reaction, Hollow Knight content creator fireb0rn stated on Twitter that Griffin had told him Pellen's changes were a "nothingburger", fireb0rn ending his tweet with "the cake was a lie". Griffin himself confirmed this on Discord and stated via Twitter that Silksong was still in development. The event was dubbed the "cake incident". Ultimately, however, Silksong appeared at the 2 April 2025 direct, leading many to declare "THE CAKE WAS REAL!!!!", with those "kept on believing" celebrating. PC Gamer speculated that the cake incident may have been "in fact, a truth—one [Team Cherry] had to walk back on", following Silksong's appearance at the direct.

=== Interactions with playtester ===
I see TC work so hard to get this game out and its annoying to see people disrespect them so much because they don;t care for attention whoring with fake updates every week like most other indies. There simply ARE NO FUCKING UPDATES. the game is being made WHEN THERE ARE UPDATES YOU WILL GET THEM [sic]

— Graig on Discord, December 2023

In February 2023, reported Silksong playtester Graig stated on Discord that he "[felt] for [the community]", stating, "I really want this game to release ASAP and the testers are working hard to get it out to you, as well as [Team Cherry], of course [...] It will come and it is a glorious game worth the wait." This followed numerous memes about "hopium" and "copium" that day, and while PC Gamer described the Discord chat as more "lively" than "upset", one user joked about setting fire to Team Cherry's office. In December of that year, Graig responded to community frustration at the lack of Silksong at The Game Awards 2023 with "I see [Team Cherry] work so hard to get the game out and it's annoying to see people disrespect them so much", and "there simply are no fucking updates. The game is being made—when there are updates, you will get them." While the community at large did not fully appreciate his comments, plenty of fans were understanding, admitting that their longing for Silksong could be irritating to others. Graig apologized on r/Silksong in the same month for his "outburst", calling it "immature", and writing "I was emotional after reading about three days' worth of posts being angry at my friends", which was met with praise by fans. He further clarified that he "do[esn't] work in-house at Team Cherry", but have "[contracted] to them in the past."

Interactions were more hostile the following year. On 18 June 2024, following Silksong's complete absence from Summer Game Fest and Nintendo Direct, Graig, who was known to have stopped his work as a playtester to work on his own game "some time ago", stated that he "literally know[s] they are not in dev hell", referring to Team Cherry and development hell. The community was described as "eviscerating" him over this statement, with some accusing him of having a history of "toying with people", some further "turn[ing] on each other" for trusting Graig. Believing him was described by some as "cope [they] didn't think was possible." PC Gamer described Graig as having "a reputation for being a bit of a troll", while also having "far more sympathetic moments towards the fanbase". He responded to the community's reaction negatively, stating he "thought [he] would help people feel better" and "[got] abused" for trying to do so, also agreeing that Team Cherry's communication could be better.

== Daily Silksong News ==
The first episode of Daily Silksong News

The YouTube channel Daily Silksong News was started by Araraura on 16 January 2021, some 702 days following the reveal of Silksong. It provided daily video updates to inform viewers on the latest news regarding Silksong, even when there is no such news. Videos were typically around 25 seconds in total length due to most of them containing the declaration that "there is no news" although some special episodes were longer and more elaborate, such as a recreation of Team Fortress 2's "Meet the Spy", and a recount of all pre-2021 days. Araraura, also abbreviated as Ara, credited the following people for helping the channel: "Dai Locke, Kishan, Tinta, Pupe, Suscat, Axo and the rest of the 17 souls". Almost every video consisted of the script, "Today is [date]. This is [host name], your host for today bringing you your daily Silksong news. There has been no news to report for Silksong today. This has been your daily news for Silksong for today, [date]." Many episodes of Daily Silksong News were also guest-hosted by other social media personalities. Video categories included "yes", when there was news, and "maybe" and "no, but..." news days where there was not any major news, but something Silksong related still occurred.

Araraura said that he did not expect to reach even 500 days of providing updates. By January 2024, the channel's video count had reached the same number of chapters as the manga One Piece. A month later, Daily Silksong News was reported to have grown more pessimistic regarding the future of the game. In March 2025, Araraura expressed skepticism at a blog post by Xbox which said that the game would be releasing soon, commenting, "It's not a very concrete confirmation that Silksong will be releasing next month, or anything". Araraura further reacted despondently when he unsuccessfully predicted one day before that month's Nintendo Direct that Silksong would be mentioned. When the release window of Silksong was finally announced on 2 April 2025, the channel was described as "spiralling" with excitement. The day before, the channel had uploaded a video for April Fools Day claiming the channel was to be disbanded after a cease and desist notice. Even so, the channel tweeted that "there's a part of me that's not ready for the end". Following the announcement of Silksong's release date, episodes of Daily Silksong News featured a countdown to its release. The final video for the series on Silksong's base game, titled "The End", premiered as Silksong released on 4 September 2025. It featured a stop-motion skit that ended with a face reveal of Araraura. The final video had over 15,000 viewers, with the channel as a whole accruing over 234,000 subscribers as of its release. On Silksong's release, Araraura called it "surreal", further stating: "It feels unreal in a way, I got so used to Silksong just being 'a game that's not out' now that it's about to be it almost feels like I'm about to experience something that was out of my reach for so long".

=== News statistics ===
Number of Daily Silksong News videos with Yes, Maybe, or Kinda News by month
- Maybe or Kinda news
- Yes news

== r/Silksong ==
Prior to its release, a subreddit for Silksong, called r/Silksong, was created on Reddit. The subreddit was created on August 9, 2021. As of September 2023, the subreddit had a little under 20,000 members; by 5 August 2025, the number had risen drastically to around 165,000. Community members turned the lack of Silksong news into a meta culture of jokes, memes, and factions. By 2025, many users had faction labels such as doubter, denier, or "beleiver" [sic], the latter of which being purposefully misspelled because "there is no lie in be[lie]ving." In one March 2025 instance following the lack of Silksong news at the month's Nintendo Direct, the subreddit was described by PC Gamer as having a "downright mythological conflict" between the "beleivers" and "doubters", the two factions also being called a "twin cult" and having a "tribalistic divide" by the outlet. IGN summarized the divide between the two factions with "the believers hold out hope, while the doubters sow doubt."

A mockup of a type of text-based Silkpost, featuring humorous discussion about a fabricated meeting with Gibson and Pellen

As the hype for Silksong kept building, the subreddit "filled up with nonsensical blabber and made-up tweets", which were called "Silkposts" by the community, a play on the term shitpost. Described as "false-news shitpost[s]", posts are signified as being Silkposts through using the Silkpost flair, and contain false information framed in a joking manner, often aimed at tricking fans seeking Silksong news. PC Gamer described the aftermath of a Silkpost being posted as "everyone who reads it can briefly exist in a world where something ever happens before seeing the flair and realising they've been got." TheGamer noted that "almost every post" on the subreddit as of May 2025 was a Silkpost. Examples of Silkposts include fictional last-minute delays from Team Cherry, fake livestreams and announcements presenting as official, and posts pretending that the game had already been released. One Silkpost was reported to have correctly predicted the game's release date before its announcement. In August 2023, many of the subreddit's top posts related to a fishing minigame in Silksong, a joke that spawned around 2021. The posts ranged from simple comedic shitposts to high-effort artwork. Many Silkposts edited Hornet into other, unrelated things, including "political debates, fast food ads, [and] biblical scripture." Upon the announcement of Silksong being at Gamescom 2025, some users were in disbelief, initially expecting the news to be a Silkpost, with one stating "Bait used to b- holy shit this is real." The user "E1331" was a noted member and poster of Silkposts on the subreddit.

=== Community events ===
The r/Silksong subreddit also had notable community events. In February 2024, "dozens" of posts were made advocating for the subreddit's deletion, reportedly to get Team Cherry's attention. One post read, in part: "DELETE THE SUBREDDIT ON FEBRUARY 14TH [...] THE ERA OF SILENCE MUST COME TO AN END." On 14 February 2024, Griffin reconfirmed that the game was still in development. In June of that year, user E1331 was jokingly "publicly sacrificed via hanging" by the subreddit moderators, due to E1331 "taking a bite out of the Team Cherry logo". As the 4 September 2025 release date approached, users began joking about banishing each other back to 2019 to "endure the wait for Silksong all over again."

In subs beyond they speak your username with hope and bait, / For none could tame our coping souls yet you silkposted anyway, / Under believer watch, you doubted, we accepted, deniers were redeemed, / A subreddit you gave to believer and doubter as they had never dreamed

— "Elegy" following user sacrifice, July 2025

In July 2025, four prominent users were "sealed" away to provide hope to those waiting for Silksong news, being set to be "unsealed" upon its release. This represented them being banned from the Silksong subreddit, with some of the banned users self-restricting themselves from interacting with any Silksong content at all while being banned. Three of the chosen users were "democratically elected" via voting, with the fourth being the user who suggested the event. The banned users were called "dreamers", a reference to the set of characters from Hollow Knight that entered an eternal sleep. The incident was described by The Guardian as a "mock [ritual sacrifice]". Later that month, a subreddit moderator was stated to have been sacrificed by the mod team as "an ultimate sacrifice"; the announcement post garnered over 3,000 upvotes. Similar to the "dreamer" label, they were declared the subreddit's "Hollow Knight". (Note: Done in alignment with Hollow Knight's lore surrounding the "Hollow Knight" character) A user also petitioned for a sacrifice of 5% of r/Silksong.

Also in July, subreddit members created "Snosk", a boogeyman character based on the boss fight Nosk from Hollow Knight. Similar to how Nosk, a shapeshifter, aims to lure in the player, Snosk was characterized as using a copy of the then-unreleased Silksong to lure victims into the dark. Fictional public service announcements were released, along the lines of "do not approach or attempt to pick up any copy of Silksong outdoors, or one that isn't yours". Community members pretended that they had encountered Snosk out in the wild. Users offered fictional "containment ideas" to imprison the creature. Subreddit moderators called for "anti-Snosk fan art" in order to "banish the Snosks for good". This resulted in numerous artworks of the character, and the trend eventually faded.

== Coverage and analysis ==
Jason Schreier of Bloomberg asked Team Cherry about Silkposts in an exclusive interview.

Dan Olson analyzed Silkposting in a talk at PAX East in 2025.

Team Cherry marketing director Matthew Griffin recognized Silkposting, joking in a June 2025 livestream chat that he believed Silkposting would continue even after Silksong released, because "there's always DLC". Bloomberg journalist Jason Schreier covered Silkposts in his interview piece with Team Cherry, reporting that Gibson and Pellen "tuned it all out, rarely going online" on platforms like Reddit, though their friends and family would sometimes "send them some of the funniest [comments]." Gibson told Schreier, "It's nice that people are passionate about the game, and that they've obviously formed their own strange or very exciting communities around it", with Pellen jokingly adding "Feels like we're going to ruin their fun by releasing the game".

Writing for Polygon, Ana Diaz compared the wait for Silksong to EarthBound fans asking for an English translation of Mother 3, also noting that the "avid fandom can spark the ire" of other viewers in livestreams, and arguing that the community had "inadvertently psyched up others excited for the game" due to repeatedly causing it to trend online. Stating that a "mythology" materialized around Silksong, The New York Times's Jackson Ryan described the community as "obsessed". Writing for PC Games Insider, Alex Forbes-Calvin described the community as "rabid and, er, 'enthusiastic'", and called the experience of visiting r/Silksong "a fun time." Tom Faber of the Financial Times praised the community for "turn[ing] a parody of video game hype cycles into a kind of surreal art form", writing that the community exhibited "the best parts of the online gaming community: camaraderie, creativity and passion."

Engadget journalist Jessica Conditt called r/Silksong "a fascinating little universe" that consistently made her laugh when visited, characterizing the community as a "hyper-focused cult fandom". Keller Gordon of NPR stated that r/Silksong was more about "coping" than it was about news, and described it as "relentless[ly] creativ[e]". Gordon also noted the similarity between the "devotion" of Silkposting and Silksong's plot, which is "steeped in religious imagery". The PC Gamer journalist Harvey Randall published numerous articles focused on the community. (Note: Articles included: 2024: April, May, June; 2025: January, March, April, May, June, July, August, September) He described himself in April 2025 as "being PC Gamer's resident 'the Silksong community's having a bad time' writer". Randall interviewed Daily Silksong News host Araraura multiple times. He praised the channel, calling it "ever-reliable", with colleague Tyler Corp also calling Araraura an "incredible internet hero". PC Gamer writer Robin Valentine predicted that Silksong itself would not live up to expectations set by its fans and suggested the level of pressure created by the hype might have been one of the reasons development was prolonged.

The core of a good Silkpost [...] what you're attempting to do is bait people into having hope and then crush it. You want it to be just real enough that they look, and they go, "Oh." And then it's like, "Wait, I can't find the VOD. Where is it? I need it. I want it. Why can't I find it?"

— Dan Olson at PAX, May 2025

In 2025, Canadian documentarian Dan Olson held a talk about the culture of Silkposting at PAX. Finding every community to have "in-jokes, internal humor, [and] self-deprecation", Olson described the Silksong community's manifestation of this as "delightful". He described the core of a good Silkpost as baiting readers "into having hope and then crush[ing] it", with the post needing to be "just real enough that they look". Olson posited that many Silkposts imagining the game as "weird and bad" stemmed from a "real anxiety that exists within any community anticipating something", namely "what if it comes out and then it's not any good", and that such posts relieved that stress. He analyzed the cake incident as an example of "humans [being] pattern seeking animals [that] invent patterns where they don't exist". Olson cited the fact that Hollow Knight was Kickstarted, stating that "there's [...] a tremendous amount of social co-ownership in the community", arguing "that sort of perceived co-ownership [...] that closeness to the production of it has kind of led to the very peculiar strain of derangement that is a lot closer to how you would roast your like immediate friends." He noted this closeness "likely put incalculable stress" on Team Cherry as "the dark side of all of this."

== Legacy ==
The community's culture continued even after Silksong's release. In December 2025, Team Cherry announced the first expansion for Silksong, Sea of Sorrow, setting it for a 2026 release. Months later by September 2026, a release date had still not yet been announced, with the last official major update being a Silksong patch announcement in March, which briefly mentioned that it was the last "significant" patch before Sea of Sorrow. Kotaku noted "that familiar 'Silksong when??' panic is starting to set in again among some fans." Some fans continue to scavenge for news, and Silkposting still remains a prominent feature of r/Silksong culture.
