= Hollow Knight: Silksong – Sea of Sorrow =

Upcoming video game expansion

- Promotional art
- Developer: Team Cherry
- Publisher: Team Cherry
- Directors: Ari Gibson; William Pellen
- Designers: Ari Gibson; William Pellen
- Programmers: William Pellen; Jasmine Vine
- Artist: Ari Gibson
- Writers: Ari Gibson; William Pellen
- Composer: Christopher Larkin
- Series: Hollow Knight
- Release: 2026
- Genre: Metroidvania
- Mode: Single-player

Hollow Knight: Silksong – Sea of Sorrow is an upcoming 2026 free expansion for the 2025 Metroidvania game Hollow Knight: Silksong, developed and published by Australian independent developer Team Cherry. It was announced in December 2025 as Silksong's first expansion, for a 2026 release.

Sea of Sorrow has been described by Team Cherry as a "giant expansion", and it is nautical-themed, with new areas, bosses, and tools promised. Based on aspects of the trailer and announcement, it has been speculated to feature content initially cut from Silksong by video game journalists and the Silksong community. The expansion's release has been heavily anticipated, akin to Silksong pre-release.

== Background ==
Hollow Knight: Silksong was released in September 2025, over six years after its announcement. Shortly before its release, Team Cherry co-founders and co-directors Ari Gibson and William Pellen were interviewed by Bloomberg journalist Jason Schreier, revealing plans to add new content for Silksong after its release. These plans were reiterated in a follow-up interview with Schreier in November, in which Pellen also promised new information "soon". The same month, Silksong composer Christopher Larkin told Bandcamp in an interview that he was "still doing some stuff for Team Cherry".

== Gameplay and plot ==
Team Cherry has described Sea of Sorrow as a "giant expansion", in which protagonist Hornet will "voyage across and beneath a salt-stricken ocean brimming with mystery and menace". The developers promise "new areas, bosses, tools, and more". The expansion is nautical-themed.

== Development and release ==
On 15 December 2025, Team Cherry announced Sea of Sorrow in a blog post, alongside an animated teaser trailer. Team Cherry confirmed that Sea of Sorrow would be released sometime in 2026, with no exact date given. It was said to release at no additional cost, and serve as Silksong's first expansion. Team Cherry then took a few weeks off that month to prepare for 2026.

In March 2026, Team Cherry released a patch for Silksong, which they described in a blog post as the last "significant" update for Silksong before Sea of Sorrow's release. In May, Fangamer announced a physical release for Silksong. The product's store listing mentioned that "Sea of Sorrow DLC is not included on game media but will be available to download for free". The physical edition released that November, which also included an accompanying video game manual, in which Sea of Sorrow is briefly overviewed as a "content pack" and is stated to be "coming soon".

== Reception ==
=== Pre-release ===
Like the base game, Sea of Sorrow has been heavily anticipated by the Silksong community, which Kotaku described in September 2026 as "that familiar "Silksong when??" panic is starting to set in again among some fans". The brief mention of Sea of Sorrow in the physical edition's product description received attention from the community, with the wording interpreted as implying both that Sea of Sorrow would or would not be released before the physical edition's release by different fans. In May 2026, Team Cherry marketing and publishing contractor Matthew "Leth" Griffin replied to a fan jokingly stating "Reliable sources tell me Sea of Sorrow this month" on Twitter with a monocle emoji, which GamesRadar+ described as "[setting] the community off", causing speculation about a release in May.

The relatively limited information on the expansion as of yet has been the subject of analysis by the community and video game journalists. GameSpot writer Hayley Williams wrote that "Based on the small vignettes shown in the trailer, it seems likely that Sea of Sorrow will be set in Pharloom Bay, a seaside area featured in Silksong's reveal trailer that was cut from the final game", further noting that an image in the trailer resembled "The Lab", a location visible on early maps and concept art for Silksong. James Archer of Rock Paper Shotgun theorized similarly, citing community discussion including the fact that old footage of Pharloom Bay contains "distinct scythe-shaped bell lamps of an almost identical design to the lashed structures we see in the very first shot of Sea of Sorrow's own teaser". Archer also stated that he was not "disdaining" the practice of "recycling ideas" for expansions, stating "it's quite cool to see individual concepts float in and out of the gamesmaking process". Writing for Inverse, Robin Bea speculated alike, also mentioning the fact that the Silksong character Alchemist Zylotol seemingly refers to Pharloom Bay in-game as "the birthplace of Lifeblood", which is a glowing blue substance appearing in both Silksong and the original Hollow Knight. She further called the mention of "new areas" in Team Cherry's announcement blog post as making "the teaser so intriguing".

In late December 2025, an unused cutscene internally named "Submersible_Travel.mp4" was found in the files of the Nintendo Switch release of Silksong by a Reddit user. George Foster of TheGamer described the cutscene as showing "a submarine travelling through some water in a similar manner to the Bell Beast when you fast-travel". According to the file's metadata, the cutscene is dated to 14 December 2020. Despite interpreting this date as indicating that the scene may be cut content, Diana Golenko of VGTimes speculated "it's possible that the cutscene could finally find a proper use" in Sea of Sorrow, due to the expansion's "focus on maritime themes". Foster took the cutscene's discovery as suggesting "some kind of underwater transport was planned for Silksong at some point in development", further stating "the underwater theme makes it fit right in with [...] Sea of Sorrow", and speculating it is "possible that Team Cherry is revisiting the idea in the DLC".
