= Pale Court =

2023 video game mod

- Platforms: Windows, macOS, Linux
- Release: 1 July 2023
- Genre: Gameplay mod

Pale Court is a 2023 fan-made video game mod for the 2017 metroidvania game Hollow Knight by Team Cherry. Developed by a large group of modders, it was released in July 2023. The mod adds five main boss fights based on the "Five Great Knights", as well as new charms, music, dialogue, and artwork.

Pale Court was announced in 2020. Upon release, it received praise from video game journalists and the Hollow Knight community. Critics praised its additions, with some comparing its quality to Team Cherry's work and akin to official downloadable content (DLC) for Hollow Knight. It was also described as a way for players to pass the time while waiting for Hollow Knight: Silksong, Hollow Knight's sequel announced in 2019, which had not yet received a release date.

== Overview and background ==
Gameplay screenshot of the player fighting the boss Kindly Isma

Pale Court is a fan-made video game mod for the 2017 metroidvania Hollow Knight by Team Cherry. The mod introduces new boss battles against the Five Great Knights, characters in Hollow Knight's plot. They can be battled by using the Dream Nail at specific locations, an item obtained during Hollow Knight's progression.

In Hollow Knight, the Five Great Knights are referenced, but not all of them are met during the events of the game. In the game's lore, the Five Great Knights comprise Ze’mer (also known as Grey Mourner), Ogrim (aka the Dung Defender), Dryya, Hegemol, and Isma, the former two being alive and met during the events of the game.

Pale Court features five primary challenging boss fights, such as the bosses Kindly Isma and Fierce Dryya. A secret extra boss fight is also included, Tiso, who is a supporting character character in Hollow Knight. Beyond bosses, Pale Court additionally adds new artwork, music, and dialogue. New charms are also added, which are a key mechanic in Hollow Knight, being items that can be equipped by the player, giving unique effects.

== Development and release ==
Pale Court's credits feature more than fifty people. The mod was developed over the course of multiple years. In a pre-release statement, the developers stated that "From attack design, animations, VFX, and character [voice acting] we want to make sure we're doing everything to the best of our ability for the player in mind". The popular Hollow Knight content creator mossbag was featured as a voice actor. During development, the team had to also split their focus between development and their education and work. Pale Court was announced in May 2020. In June 2023, the development team released a trailer for Pale Court, revealing that the mod would release on 1 July 2023. The mod was made available to download via Hollow Knight mod managers such as Scarab.

== Reception ==
The art, the music, the voicework—everything is so on-point that it could pass for official DLC. The modders behind The Pale Court nailed the Hollow Knight vibe so well that the transition into these modded areas is completely seamless. Upon entering Isma's arena, I felt like I'd stumbled into some secret corner of the game I'd just missed my first go around. That was before she took a bow and thrashed me to death with her vines.

— Harvey Randall of PC Gamer

Pale Court was praised by many video game journalists. PC Gamer writer Harvey Randall praised the mod's art, music, voicework, and boss battles, stating "the modders behind The Pale Court nailed the Hollow Knight vibe so well that the transition into these modded areas is completely seamless." He cited Pale Court as a "great example of why mods are at the heart of PC gaming", and believed the mod was quality enough to pass off as official downloadable content (DLC) for Hollow Knight. In IGN España, journalist Raquel Morales wrote analogously, calling the art and music "faithful", further stating that the mod's June 2023 trailer looks as if it was made by Team Cherry themselves, and that it feels just like the base game. Austin Wood of GamesRadar+ called Pale Court "so big and beautiful that [it] legitimately looks official", writing that its art and music fit right in with Team Cherry's style, and that its art and bosses are "top-shelf". However, he also pointed out that some of the new charms are "overtuned". Bruno Ouviña of 3DJuegos praised the gameplay, stating that the mod offers an experience that could last for several hours, and that its charms allow players to re-experience Hollow Knight's combat.

Writing for Multiplayer.it, Giorgio Melani praised how Pale Court follows Team Cherry's style and respects the game's lore, also stating that it could pass as official DLC. Gerard Martí of Vandal praised alike, noting its charms, music, and artwork as complementing Hollow Knight's aesthetic. Journalist Adam Celarek In Gry-Online noted each boss' unique behavior, praising them as on par with the base game's battles. Game Rant's Nickolas Davis wrote that the bosses "look like they can challenge even veteran players of [Hollow Knight] and could possibly rate with some of the best Hollow Knight bosses ever". He hoped that Team Cherry would eventually do an "officially sanctioned version" of the mod. Writing for TheGamer, Joshua Robertson called Pale Court "one of the most impressive fan made creations since the game was released" and passable as an official expansion, though stated on its new charms that players "may want to avoid them if [they] don't want to upset the balance". In an update to their March 2023 list of the best Hollow Knight mods, the outlet additionally listed Pale Court as one of the game's best mods, writing "If you loved Hollow Knight, and you've played it so many times that you can't help but wish for more, then you need to play [it]. In September 2025, Game Rant also mentioned Pale Court as an example of the "tremendous ways for players to alter the experience" of Hollow Knight, a reason to play the game on PC.

Pale Court was also praised by the Hollow Knight fandom. According to Ouviña, it received overwhelmingly positive feedback from players and content creators. Content creator and speedrunner fireb0rn heavily praised the mod. Ouviña described discussions about Silksong as being overshadowed at times as focus shifted to Pale Court. He described it as something to play while waiting for Silksong. David Rodriguez in HobbyConsolas likewise called playing the mod something to do while waiting for Silksong, calling it "fantastic", and Martí believed it would help pass time for the sequel. Similarly, VG247 writer Kelsey Raynor stated "given that we're still enduring the wait for any sign of Silksong news, [Pale Court] looks to be a great way of revisiting Hollow Knight in the meantime", additionally praising the "plenty of passion" put into the mod that he felt was clear. Graham Smith of Rock Paper Shotgun thought that "if you're one of the bajillion people who yell "where's Hollow Knight: Silksong" during every video game livestream, maybe [Pale Court will] tide you over", alluding to the behavior of the Silksong community at the time. Prior to its release, PCGamesN's Anna Koselke predicted based on its June 2023 trailer and other materials that Pale Court would be "big enough to stand on its own as the precursor to Silksong while we wait for [it]", and expressed excitement towards its release.
