= Uncle Chop's Rocket Shop =

2024 video game

- Developer: Beard Envy
- Publisher: Kasedo Games
- Platforms: Windows; Nintendo Switch
- Release: December 5, 2024
- Genres: Simulation, Roguelite
- Mode: Single-player

Uncle Chop's Rocket Shop is a 2024 simulation and roguelite video game developed by Beard Envy and published by Kasedo Games. The player takes the role of Wilbur, a fox-headed mechanic working for the exacting Uncle Chop, repairing damaged starships against escalating rent deadlines. It was released for Windows and Nintendo Switch on December 5, 2024.

The game received generally favorable reviews, holding a "Strong" aggregate score of 78 out of 100 on OpenCritic from 16 critic reviews.

== Gameplay ==
Uncle Chop's Rocket Shop casts the player as Wilbur, a mechanic who must repair broken starship modules brought into the shop while meeting recurring rent payments. Repairs are deliberately intricate: each module has an accompanying in-game manual that the player must consult to diagnose faults, and the process involves manually loosening and tightening bolts, swapping components and managing a limited inventory. The speed and quality of the player's work determine profitability, and failure to meet deadlines carries roguelite consequences.

The game offers two modes, "Frantic Fixing" and "Focused Fixing", the latter allowing players to work through repairs methodically rather than under time pressure.

== Reception ==
Uncle Chop's Rocket Shop holds a "Strong" aggregate score of 78 out of 100 on OpenCritic from 16 critic reviews, with 75% of critics recommending it. Scores varied widely, from a maximum 5 out of 5 from TheGamer and 9 out of 10 from The Games Machine down to 5 out of 10 from Nintendo Life. PC Gamer described the game as "weird and wonderful", and Destructoid scored it 8.5 out of 10.

Reviewing the game for Rogueliker, Kirsty Holmes praised its difficulty balance, writing that "the learning curve is steep enough to require effort, but not so steep it felt Sisyphean", and highlighted the availability of the less time-pressured "Focused Fixing" mode as helping the game remain engaging rather than frustrating.
