= Team Cherry =

Team Cherry may refer to:

- Team Cherry, an Australian video game developer known for the Hollow Knight franchise
- Team Cherry, an ice hockey team in the CHL/NHL Top Prospects Game
