= Hollow Knight: Silksong =

2025 video game

- Developer: Team Cherry
- Publisher: Team Cherry
- Directors: Ari Gibson; William Pellen
- Designers: Ari Gibson; William Pellen
- Programmers: William Pellen; Jasmine Vine
- Artist: Ari Gibson
- Writers: Ari Gibson; William Pellen
- Composer: Christopher Larkin
- Series: Hollow Knight
- Engine: Unity
- Platforms: Linux; macOS; Nintendo Switch; Nintendo Switch 2; PlayStation 4; PlayStation 5; Windows; Xbox One; Xbox Series X/S
- Release: 4 September 2025
- Genre: Metroidvania
- Mode: Single-player

Hollow Knight: Silksong is a 2025 Metroidvania game developed and published by Australian independent developer Team Cherry. The sequel to Hollow Knight (2017), the story follows Hallownest's former princess-protector, Hornet—a major secondary character in Hollow Knight—after she is captured and transported to the unfamiliar land of Pharloom. Gameplay sees the player navigating through the interconnected areas of this kingdom, where they must battle enemies, traverse platforming challenges, and complete quests using various skills, tools, and movement mechanics.

It was originally planned as downloadable content (DLC) for Hollow Knight, part of a stretch goal to make Hornet playable from the game's 2014 Kickstarter campaign. The project grew in scope over time, prompting Team Cherry to announce in February 2019 that it would instead become a standalone sequel. Following publicized plans to launch by June 2023, Silksong was released on 4 September 2025 for Linux, macOS, Nintendo Switch, Nintendo Switch 2, PlayStation 4, PlayStation 5, Windows, Xbox One, and Xbox Series X/S. During the seven years between announcement and release, Team Cherry's limited press communication led to heavy speculation over the game's release, and online communities developed a culture around this uncertainty.

Silksong received critical acclaim for its graphics, soundtrack, story, world design, and gameplay, though opinions on its high difficulty were mixed. The game has been nominated for numerous accolades, including multiple for game of the year. It had sold over seven million copies by December 2025. A free DLC expansion titled Sea of Sorrow is set to release in 2026, with more expansions planned in the future.

== Gameplay ==
Gameplay screenshot showcasing Hornet in combat with three enemies

Hollow Knight: Silksong's gameplay is similar to its predecessor Hollow Knight, featuring 2D platforming and combat. Some changes are made from the original, such as the player character moving more acrobatically and healing faster. Side-quests (called "Wishes") are tracked in a menu. These quests are provided by non-player characters or found at quest boards.

Equippable "Tools" are divided into three categories: blue and yellow Tools are passive and support-oriented, while red Tools are typically offensive weapons. Red Tools are manually activated and have a limited number of charges which must be replenished with Shell Shards, an in-game currency, at Benches. Hornet is limited in how many Tools of each colour she can equip, with her maximum capacity modified when changing between different gameplay styles, known as "Crests". In addition to their varying tool makeups, the speed and range of Hornet's attack move-set differs between Crests. Each Crest also possesses a unique mechanic, such as boosting damage dealt if hits are avoided or allowing for tools to be replenished without resting at a Bench.

When attacking enemies or interacting with certain objects and locations, Hornet adds "Silk" to her reservoir. Silk can be used for healing, with three hit points (called "Masks") recovered in a single heal. Silk can also be expended to use "Silk Skills", additional attacks which are unlocked by locating remnants of the Weavers and their society when progressing through the game. Tools, Crests and Silk Skills can be adjusted when sitting at Benches, which also serve as a source of healing and act as respawn points after all hit points are lost.

Throughout the game, Hornet also unlocks different movement options that expand her mobility and aid in combat. These include a grappling hook-like "Clawline", a "Drifter's Cloak" that catches wind currents and allows Hornet to travel upward when over updrafts or fall slowly, wall climbing ("Cling Grip"), and a vertical leap that launches her upward with her Needle ("Silk Soar").

== Plot ==
Hollow Knight Silksong takes place some time after the events of Hollow Knight. A group of veiled bugs capture Hornet, taking her to the land of Pharloom, a kingdom populated by many pilgrims seeking to reach the Citadel, a religious society located at its peak. Hornet escapes and falls into the depths of Pharloom, deducing that the veiled bugs sought to bring her to the Citadel due to her ability to produce silk, a substance used by the society for various purposes. She journeys to the Citadel to confront the veiled bugs, along the way fighting many creatures afflicted by "the Haunting" an otherworldly force found in Pharloom's silk which reanimates bugs and drives them to madness. Hornet repeatedly encounters Lace, a child-like fencer who taunts her as she approaches her destination.

Through dialogue with non-player characters and environmental imagery, the player is given insight into the history of Pharloom. In the distant past, a godlike "higher being" named Grand Mother Silk became monarch of Pharloom. She used her powers to evolve a primitive species of arachnid into the Weavers, an advanced civilisation that could produce silk, intending to have them maintain her rule. The Weavers eventually turned against Grand Mother Silk and created the Citadel, which would play a magical song used to keep the higher being dormant. They lured pilgrims to the Citadel to have them continue the song, but learned that it could not be sustained forever. Failing to find a way to eliminate Grand Mother Silk, the Weavers abandoned the kingdom. Some of the Weavers left Pharloom for the kingdom of Hallownest, with one of them eventually giving birth to Hornet.

Hornet eventually reaches the Citadel, learning that nearly all of its inhabitants, including the veiled bugs, are possessed by the Haunting. She infers that Grand Mother Silk is beginning to awaken, and has manifested the Haunting as a way to control the minds of Pharloom. She defeats Lace, who is revealed to be a creation of Grand Mother Silk that she considers her daughter, and confronts the monarch at the apex of the Citadel. Depending on the player's actions throughout the game, multiple endings can be achieved. One involves Hornet defeating Grand Mother Silk and taking her place as monarch, while another results if Hornet defeats her while infected with a parasite, which manifests and kills them both. Alternatively, if the player performs a number of wishes and other objectives, a third ending is unlocked. Hornet gains the service of a bug called the Caretaker and his family of Snail Shamans, who create a trap designed to kill Grand Mother Silk. Hornet activates the trap, which summons a destructive power called the Void. Grand Mother Silk falls into the Void followed by Lace, who betrays her mother and saves Hornet at the last moment.

If the player reloads their save file after the third ending, they can continue playing. Hornet learns that Pharloom is under attack by creatures controlled by the Void, and she descends into its source in an area called the Abyss. She learns that Grand Mother Silk is still alive and using her power to protect Lace from a sea of Void, and as a result the Void is taking control of the Haunting. Hornet resolves to descend into the sea to ensure Grand Mother Silk dies before the Void fully destroys the kingdom. She works with the Snail Shamans to acquire the Everbloom, a flower used to resist the Void, diving into the sea using it. She defeats a Void-possessed Lace, and Grand Mother Silk uses her remaining power to help Hornet take an unconscious Lace to safety. The Void destroys the Everbloom, but the protagonist from the original Hollow Knight appears and saves the two, causing the Haunting and Void to disappear from Pharloom.

== Development and release ==
Hollow Knight: Silksong was primarily developed by Team Cherry's three members: Co-founders Ari Gibson and William Pellen were the co-directors, with Gibson additionally providing most of the game's art, and Jasmine Vine served as the Technical Director. Marketing and publishing was handled by contractor Matthew "Leth" Griffin, while Christopher Larkin returned to compose the soundtrack.

=== Development timeline ===
==== 2014–2019: Conception and announcement ====
A July 2017 concept sketch of Pharloom

Hollow Knight: Silksong spawned from a Kickstarter stretch goal met during Hollow Knight's 2014 Kickstarter. During the campaign, the goal for a "Playable Hornet" was met; Team Cherry planned for it to be released as downloadable content (DLC) for Hollow Knight. Initially, Team Cherry's plan for the DLC was for it to introduce a character swapping mechanic for the base game, or a separate small "sub-chapter", but their ideas transitioned into introducing a "new land", with a major reason being that Hornet's height made her difficult to use as a player character in Hollow Knight's world of Hallownest. During this early development, the DLC grew "too large and too unique to stay a DLC", leading them to decide to make it a standalone game, which began development around 2017.

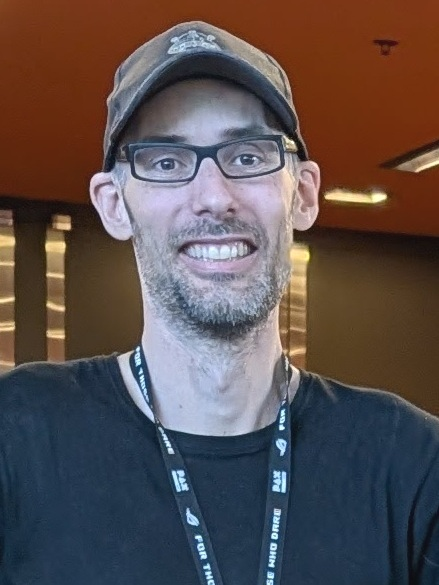
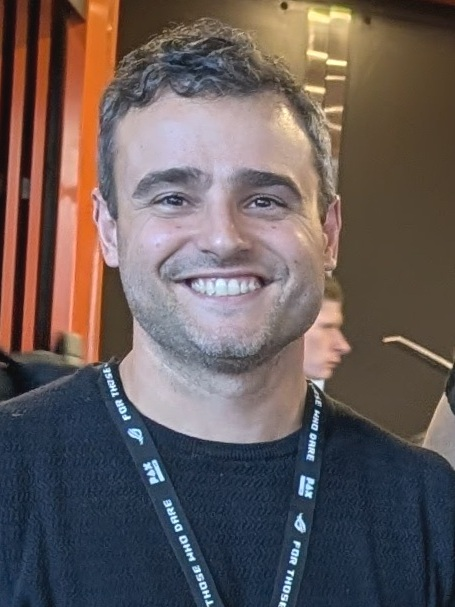
Co-directors Ari Gibson (left) and William Pellen (right)

In July 2017, Team Cherry created the first known sketch for Silksong's world of Pharloom, then known as "Loomland". It featured early concepts of areas that remained in the final game, such as Greymoor and the Marrow (Boneforest), alongside ones that were later scrapped or reworked. The Citadel, then known as the "City of Song", the central location of Silksong's narrative, existed in this original concept map. Throughout the rest of 2017 and 2018, Team Cherry continued expanding Silksong's map and developed the game while also working on Hollow Knight's announced final expansion, Godmaster, which released in August 2018.

On 14 February 2019, Team Cherry announced Silksong for Nintendo Switch and PC in a trailer, with a developer diary video sharing more information. The developers released an update in March 2019, sharing descriptions and images of characters set to appear in Silksong. They thanked the game's fans for supporting them regarding the announcement of the sequel. Silksong was playable during E3 2019, at the Nintendo booth, and a Nintendo Treehouse livestream additionally showed off the game. Post-E3, Team Cherry released a blog post, which overviewed the area "Greymoor", noting it as one of the biggest areas they ever created; the post also explained further gameplay details. In December 2019, Team Cherry posted another blog post, containing a two-track preview of the soundtrack, composed by Christopher Larkin, as well as an update on the total number of enemies developed (which was 165 at the time), with a focus on a trio, described as "members of a scholarly suite."

==== 2020–2021: Further development and major reworks ====
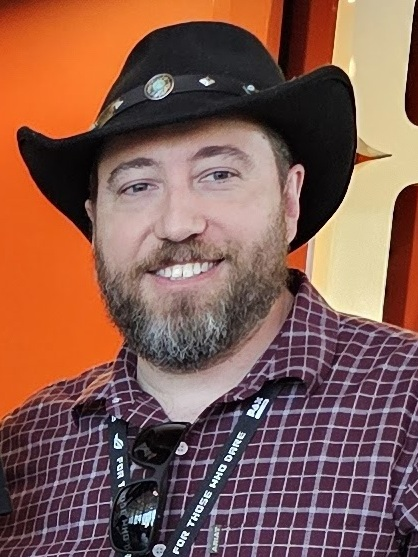
Matthew "Leth" Griffin

In early 2020, during development, Seth Goldman, a Hollow Knight fan with cancer, met Team Cherry multiple times through the Marty Lyons Foundation. Gibson and Pellen offered him to create a character design and name, which Team Cherry implemented in-game as Shrine Guardian Seth, a boss character. In June of that year, Team Cherry marketing and publishing director Matthew "Leth" Griffin began a series of riddles in Discord that revealed non-player characters and short videos of Silksong once solved; these riddles continued into July. One of the characters revealed was Shrine Guardian Seth. An interview with Team Cherry for A Profound Waste of Time's second issue, which included discussion of Silksong, was conducted in July 2020 and released in 2021. In December 2020, an issue of the magazine Edge that featured Silksong as the cover story released, containing screenshots, gameplay information, and quotes from Gibson and Pellen discussing Silksong and its development.

In May 2021, Griffin stated that Team Cherry was still working on the game, and had no plans for announcements at E3 2021 and its general period. Throughout 2021, Team Cherry reworked large portions of Silksong's map, cutting multiple areas and reworking others. Removed or reworked areas include the Red Coral Gorge, the Gloom, and the Hunters' Nest, the latter being transformed into the smaller Hunter's March. The Red Coral Gorge, a lush, "massive" coral-themed area, was heavily altered and split into two areas: the Sands of Karak and Blasted Steps. According to Gibson, having "beautiful lush [areas] went against the narrative that [they] were trying to tell [about] a place where the Citadel has really consumed the lands beneath it"; noting that "it reduces the drive of the story and the character if the world is beautiful and fine". Therefore, its replacements were made to be much darker and damaged, both acting as parts of a canonical "eroded" version of the area to align with their vision.

==== 2022–2024: Platform expansion and delay ====
By 2022, Silksong's map reached a more stable state, one roughly similar to how it appears in the final release, with comparatively minimal map reworks occurring in later months. The Abyss, the late-game area unlocked in the hidden act three, began receiving development focus from Team Cherry this year, with a very early version of it appearing on a development map dated to April. An article in PC Gamer from February 2022 showcased Pellen stating that Silksong was still in development, with him further explaining that more details would be revealed as Silksong got closer to its release.

A new action-focused trailer for Silksong was showcased at the Xbox & Bethesda Games Showcase in June 2022, revealing that the game would be released on Xbox Game Pass at launch, with the game being available through the service for PC, Xbox One, and Xbox Series X/S. While no release date or window was announced in the trailer, then Xbox president Sarah Bond during the event and the Xbox Twitter account both stated that all games in the showcase will be released within twelve months, implying they expected a release by 12 June 2023, which the account later confirmed in a reply.

In September 2022, Sony confirmed in a tweet that the game would come to PlayStation 4 and PlayStation 5. On 10 May 2023, Griffin declared that Silksong was delayed, explaining on Twitter that "[they] had planned to release in the first half of 2023", that "development is still continuing", that the game "[has] gotten quite big", and to "expect more details [...] closer to release." During the rest of 2023 and 2024, news was minimal and mostly came from Griffin, who, per PC Gamer, "[didn't share] too much". Throughout 2024, he reconfirmed that Silksong was in development multiple times, and posted about minor updates such as the Microsoft Store page for Silksong going live in April. According to Pellen, recounting development, Team Cherry was mainly polishing the game in 2024.

==== 2025: Release and impact ====
In early 2025, Gibson and Pellen began targeting a fall 2025 release internally. In January 2025, in response to rumors regarding a Silksong appearance at the then-upcoming April Nintendo Switch 2 Nintendo Direct, (Note: See Hollow Knight: Silksong pre-release community for more information.) Griffin denied the rumors and said that Silksong was still in active development, was progressing, and was still planned for release.

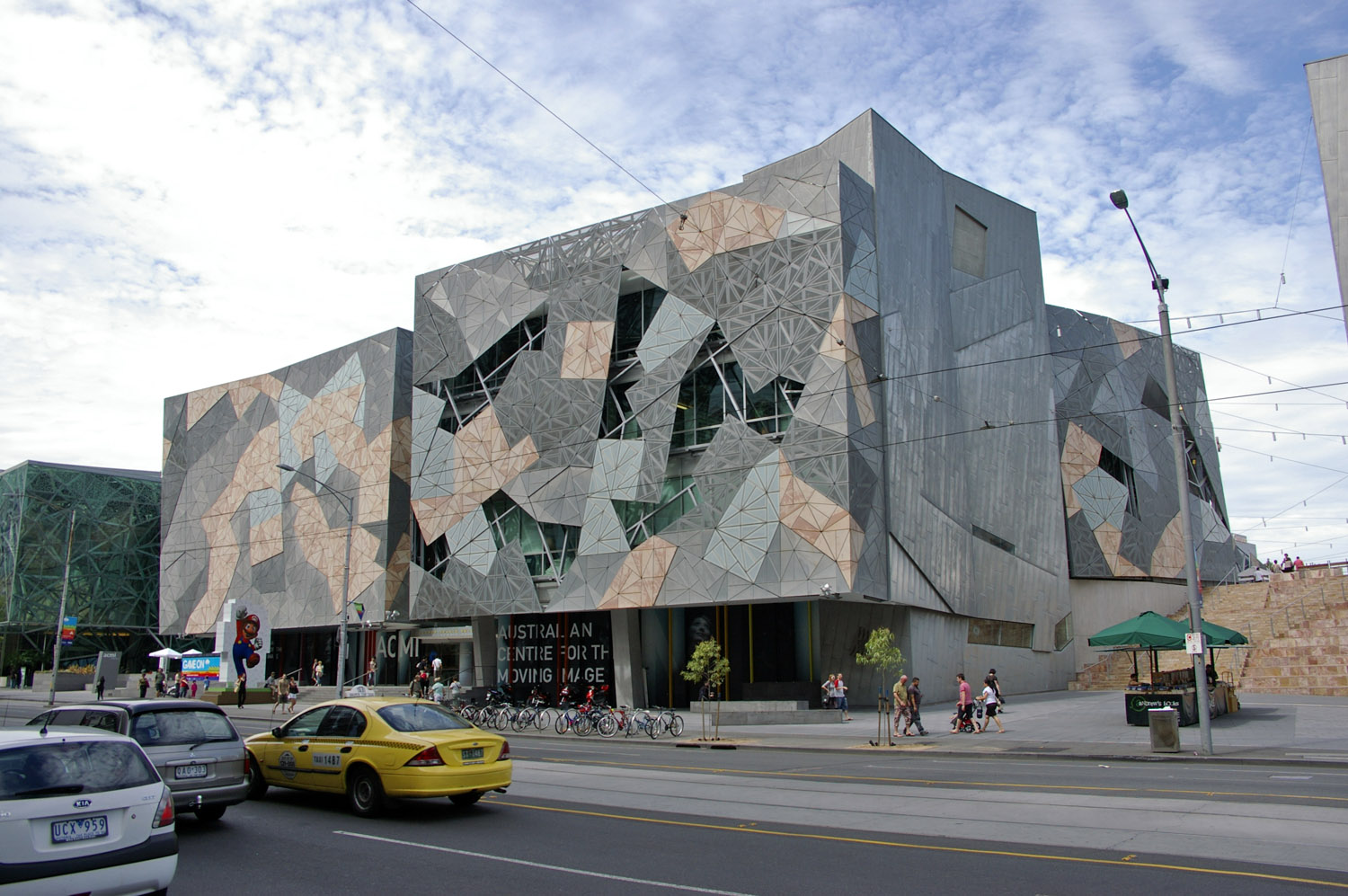
In May 2025, Silksong was confirmed to appear at the 18 September-opened Game Worlds exhibit hosted by ACMI (museum pictured in 2008), leading to speculation on a possible pre-18 September release.

During the 2 April 2025 Nintendo Direct for the Nintendo Switch 2, Silksong was presented in a sizzle reel, where it was given a 2025 release date, alongside some new footage. Soon after, Nintendo sent new screenshots of the game to press. On 1 May, IGN announced that Silksong would appear at ACMI's then-upcoming Game Worlds showcase, which opened on 18 September 2025. The exhibit was confirmed to include sprites from the game, information on boss fights, and the ability to play Silksong. They also shared a partial spritesheet of Hornet. On 8 June, Silksong appeared at the 2025 Xbox Games Showcase, as part of the reveal trailer for the ROG Xbox Ally. It was confirmed to be available on the console day one; the console was planned to release in Holiday 2025. Soon after this announcement, Griffin clarified that the game would release before Christmas 2025, and that it was "...not tied to a console release."

On 28 July, a new demo was announced to be playable at the Xbox booth during Gamescom 2025, which started on 20 August; it was later confirmed to be playable at the Nintendo booth as well. On 19 August, Team Cherry announced that they would have a "special announcement" on 21 August. A Bloomberg interview with Gibson and Pellen was also announced to release on that day; it was stated to "explore why Silksong has taken seven years to develop." Also on 19 August, Silksong appeared at Gamescom Opening Night Live, where it received new footage. Two days later, the Bloomberg interview was published, and the "special announcement" aired on YouTube; it was the game's release trailer, which revealed the game's 4 September 2025 release date.

During the first three days of its release in early September 2025, Silksong had over five million players, including one million playing via Xbox Game Pass and three million via Steam. Team Cherry did not send out review codes, with the Bloomberg interviewer Jason Schreier stating they told him this was due to the difficulty of organizing them as a small team and the view that it would be unfair for critics to play it before Kickstarter backers and other players.

When the game released, Steam, the Nintendo eShop, the Microsoft Store, and the PlayStation Store all experienced errors, which Team Cherry later recounted in November 2025 as having been unexpected. The announcement of the game's release date just two weeks prior to its release caused several other indie games originally set to release around the same time to be delayed for fear of being overshadowed by Silksong, while others, such as Hell Is Us, Daemon X Machina: Titanic Scion and Cronos: The New Dawn, kept their release dates as intended. When asked about the delays, Gibson explained that while they were "unfortunate", Team Cherry "felt like [they] didn’t have a lot of control over [their] own date because [they were] basically were rushing, rushing, rushing toward the end, working right up until the last point." "[T]he minute [they] thought [it] was ready to release", they released it, in part due to the lengthy development cycle and fan expectations.

==== 2025–present: Post-release content ====
In the August 2025 Bloomberg interview, Pellen stated, "Launching it is obviously quite exciting. What comes after for us is equally as exciting", with Gibson adding, "The most interesting thing now is what can we add to it next. We got a plan. Admittedly, some of the plans for that stuff are kind of ambitious as well, but hopefully we can achieve some of it." Development on more Silksong content was further discussed in a second interview with Bloomberg in November, in which Pellen clarified, "We’ll start talking about [new content] soon, but maybe we won’t mention a timeframe right now.

On 15 December 2025, the first free expansion, titled Sea of Sorrow, was announced in an animated teaser trailer. It is scheduled for release in 2026 and will feature Hornet's "voyage across and beneath the salt-stricken seas", with "new areas, bosses, tools, and more" being added upon release. Team Cherry has described Sea of Sorrow as a "giant expansion".

=== Development vision and philosophy ===
==== Vision ====
Team Cherry's original vision for the standalone Silksong title involved a smaller world than that of Hollow Knight and a quest system to encourage revisiting areas, but the map greatly expanded during development. They were also not attempting to "create a more difficult sequel", with Pellen stating in 2020 that "they're hoping for it to be a comparable test of skill to Hollow Knight". Despite this goal, Team Cherry made more enemies deal two points of damage when compared to Hollow Knight—two-fifths of Hornet's starting health—which Pellen stated was in order to have the player "spend more time at either full health or almost dead, [with] the gameplay ... snapping between these states." They decided to make Hornet's heal faster and stronger than the Knight's to combat this.

Since Hornet is "faster and more skillful than the Knight", Team Cherry believed that "the base level enemy had to be more complicated, more intelligent". To alleviate this, their vision was for "[players to] have ways to mitigate the difficulty via exploration, or learning, or even [circumvent] the challenge entirely, rather than getting stonewalled." Traditional difficulty options and sliders were excluded since they felt that "not giving the player an out to fiddle with things" helped players "focus" on finding ways to circumvent challenge, with mitigation methods being added throughout development.

They also thought this helped them focus on making challenges fair, with Gibson stating in a post-release interview: "I feel like limiting it in that way [...] means when we’re making it, we don’t have an out either. We have to be quite considerate about that stuff". Pellen further explained that, due to excluding difficulty options, "when you’re thinking about what the player’s options are, and how they might react to the world, you’re not thinking about them backing out to the options and changing the world [..] all of your thinking is in the world itself rather than on a meta level", which he enjoyed.

==== Philosophy ====
Gibson and Pellen describe Silksong's development philosophy as being a "controlled scope creep", with Gibson stating in 2020 "the way we approach these games ... is that they are just a web of ideas, and notions", and Pellen adding "with destinations that we're comfortable with not knowing what they are for a while – just building up or down to them." Gibson described the development of Silksong as "enjoyable" and "very satisfying". He and Pellen both recounted in August 2025 that they could have continued expanding the game but forced themselves to stop in order to avoid delaying its release further than necessary. According to Gibson, due to their development style, "ideas turn into something that exist[s] in the game [quickly]", which he described as "very satisfying."

Team Cherry did not expand in size at all during the development of Silksong, due to them enjoying their development "formula". They rarely used traditional development software such as Trello or Jira. The team decided to limit their communication about the game's progress during development, explaining post-release that they wanted to focus their energies on the development process itself and that they wanted to avoid revealing too many of Silksong's secrets before release. Primarily, Team Cherry were able to take their time due to the large financial success of Hollow Knight.

== Reception ==
=== Pre-release ===
The playable Silksong demo at E3 2019 received critical praise. IGN writer Tom Marks liked "its combat and movement even more than the original", and said "Silksong has the potential to be even better than the original." Ozzie Mejia of Shacknews praised the "tremendous amount of detail in the environments and in the backgrounds". Writing for Game Informer, Matt Miller prematurely called Silksong a "worthy sequel", stating "the portion of Hornet's adventure on display maintains the tradition of excellence established by the original." Nintendo World Report writer Melanie Zawodniak praised the speed in which Hornet could traverse vertically, as she believed such movement was "a bit too sluggish in Hollow Knight." Despite the short play-time, the demo made her certain that "Team Cherry [is] putting just as much of their skill and passion into the project as [in] their debut title".

The demo at Gamescom 2025 was given similar praise. Writing for Destructoid, Adam Newell called the demo "stunningly beautiful with its lush visuals and animations", and stated that he was "hooked from the start." GamesRadar+ writer Josh West stated "there's an attention to detail in its visual and audio design that's scintillating to experience. The play itself is smooth, Hollow Knight's occasional sharp edges sanded down to ensure that movement and motion is the star." Writing for Game Informer, Wesley LeBlanc stated "if what I played today is any indication, Silksong will follow in [Hollow Knight's] steps – I really enjoyed what I played." As of 15 August 2025, Silksong was on roughly 4.8 million Steam users' wishlists, by far the most-wishlisted game on the service at the time.

==== Community ====
During extended periods without major Silksong news, fans anticipated announcements at video game showcases, making the game's potential appearances a recurring subject of memes, and frequently spammed its name in livestream chats. The prolonged wait also led to heavy speculation about the Silksong's development and possible news, with minor updates being interpreted as potential clues about its release. One notable example occurred in January 2025, when fans expected an upcoming announcement on 2 April 2025 based on a cryptic tweet from Pellen and a picture of a chocolate cake, with fan predictions turning out accurate despite Griffin denying the changes meant anything. Starting in early 2021, the YouTube channel Daily Silksong News, created by Araraura, uploaded daily reports on Silksong's development, including when no new information was available, which was most often the case. The r/Silksong subreddit developed a distinct community culture, including the creation of elaborate fake news updates known as "Silkposts", and unique community events such a July 2025 event in which four users were "sacrificed" via being banned.

=== Post-release ===
Reception

Aggregate scores
Aggregator	Score
Metacritic	(PC) 90/100 (Note: Based on 48 reviews) (PS5) 92/100 (Note: Based on 21 reviews) (XSXS) 90/100 (Note: Based on 11 reviews) (NS2) 91/100 (Note: Based on 21 reviews) (NS) 94/100 (Note: Based on 5 reviews)
OpenCritic	97% recommend

Review scores
Publication	Score
Destructoid	9/10
Eurogamer	5/5
Game Informer	9/10
GameSpot	9/10
GamesRadar+	4/5
IGN	9/10
Nintendo Life	10/10
NME	5/5
PC Gamer (US)	90/100
Push Square	9/10
Video Games Chronicle	3/5

==== Critical reception ====
Hollow Knight: Silksong received "universal acclaim" according to review aggregator website Metacritic. OpenCritic reported that 97% of critics recommended the game.

Several critics felt that the game was a worthy sequel to the original and praised its larger, more ambitious scope, while others appreciated the low price point for such an expansive title. The art design of Silksong was positively received by critics, with many describing it as beautifully crafted. Likewise, Ashley Schofield of Video Games Chronicle noted the game as having gorgeous layering and intricately placed background details throughout, which she said gave Pharloom a strong sense of scale and depth. The game's soundtrack was also well received, with Christian Donlan of Eurogamer describing it as "haunted, playful, and endlessly beckoning", and Simon Fitzgerald of Push Square noting its ability to create the proper mood for a range of different situations. For its story, Tom Marks of IGN praised Silksong's writing as being consistently strong throughout. Will Bedingfield of NME regarded Hornet's "sharp, amusingly standoffish dialogue" as much more compelling compared to the original game's silent protagonist. Similarly, Marks of IGN called her an excellent hero that had a notably different tone from the original. Schofield of Video Games Chronicle described the elements of characterisation and humour given to NPCs during side-quests as highlights of the game's writing.

Reviewers noted the quicker, more nimble nature of Hornet during gameplay as compared to Hollow Knight's protagonist. Will Bedingfield of NME described her as "slashing her needle in bouncy flourishes", while Ashley Schofield of Video Games Chronicle complimented the sense of fluidity and exactness in Hornet's controls. The game's world was praised for being highly detailed and rewarding to explore. Critics such as Tyler Colp of PC Gamer appreciated how the world design contextualised the broader narrative and how its details incentivised exploration. Additionally, the world's boss battles were received positively by Oscar Taylor-Kent of GamesRadar+, who described them as being universally well-designed with a range of different fight structures.

Critics considered Silksong to be a more difficult game than its predecessor. Some elements of its difficulty were particularly contentious, such as the long "runbacks" to return to bosses, increased enemy damage as compared to Hollow Knight, scarcity of currency, and the difficulty of using Hornet's diagonal "pogo" ability, (Note: Hornet's "pogo" is not always diagonal; it can be changed by swapping "crests".) especially for platforming sections. Some reviewers appreciated how the difficulty gave the game "character", integrated the gameplay with the story and world, and provided a sense of mastery when overcoming the challenges of the game. Others, like Ashley Schofield of Video Games Chronicle, considered the difficulty tiring and demoralizing, feeling it inhibited the feeling of exploration. Reviewers were also more mixed on the game's side-quests, some of which were praised for their world-building while others were criticized as "uninspired" and "monotonous".

==== Audience response and sales ====
Due to its highly anticipated release and absence of pre-orders, Silksong caused Steam, the Nintendo eShop, the Microsoft Store, and the PlayStation Store to crash upon its launch, leading to players being unable to buy or download the game. The game reached over 100,000 concurrent players within 45 minutes after release, peaking at over 500,000 active players during the first day, reaching third place on the list of the concurrent most played games on Steam and, as of launch, the 29th of all time. The game also topped sales charts on Steam and the eShop. According to Team Cherry, the game had sold over seven million copies as of December 2025, with "millions more" playing on Xbox Game Pass.

The increased difficulty of Silksong compared to its predecessor received polarised reactions from players. Various mods to make the game easier were created a few days after release. The game initially received negative reviews from Chinese players on Steam, owing to significant quality concerns with the game's Simplified Chinese localisation. Following a still-criticized update to the translation, Team Cherry released a public beta that implemented a fan translation by "Team Cart Fix". Similar to its predecessor, the game immediately spawned a significant speedrunning community after its launch, with a speedrun completing the game in under an hour being performed less than a month after its release.

=== Awards ===
Year	Award	Category	Result	Ref.
2021	Unity Awards	Most Anticipated Game	Won	
2022	Golden Joystick Awards	Most Wanted Game	Nominated	
2023	Golden Joystick Awards	Most Wanted Game	Nominated	
2024	Golden Joystick Awards	Most Wanted Game	Nominated	
2024	Unity Awards	Most Anticipated Game	Won	
2025	Golden Joystick Awards	Ultimate Game of the Year	4th place	
2025	Golden Joystick Awards	Best Indie Game – Self-Published	Won	
2025	Golden Joystick Awards	PC Game of the Year	Won	
2025	The Game Awards 2025	Game of the Year	Nominated	
2025	The Game Awards 2025	Best Art Direction	Nominated	
2025	The Game Awards 2025	Best Score & Music (Christopher Larkin)	Nominated	
2025	The Game Awards 2025	Best Independent Game	Nominated	
2025	The Game Awards 2025	Best Action/Adventure Game	Won	
2025	The Game Awards 2025	Players' Voice	Nominated	
2026	The 2025 Steam Awards	Game of the Year	Won	
2026	The 2025 Steam Awards	Best Game You Suck At	Won	
2026	Ultra Game Awards 2025	Independent Game of the Year	Won	
2026	Ultra Game Awards 2025	Phenomenon of the Year (Independent Game)	Won	
2026	Ultra Game Awards 2025	Surprise of the Year (Independent Game)	Nominated	
2026	Ultra Game Awards 2025	Independent Game of the Year (Players' Voice)	Won	
2026	15th New York Game Awards	Statue of Liberty Award for Best World	Nominated	
2026	15th New York Game Awards	Off Broadway Award for Best Indie Game	Nominated	
2026	29th Annual D.I.C.E. Awards	Adventure Game of the Year	Nominated	
2026	7th Pégases	Best International Game	Nominated	
2026	7th Pégases	Best International Indie Game	Won	
2026	26th Game Developers Choice Awards	Game of the Year	Nominated	
2026	22nd British Academy Games Awards	Best Game	Longlisted	
2026	22nd British Academy Games Awards	Animation	Nominated	
2026	22nd British Academy Games Awards	Artistic Achievement	Nominated	
2026	22nd British Academy Games Awards	Music	Nominated	
