= William Pellen =

Australian game designer (born 1985 or 1986)

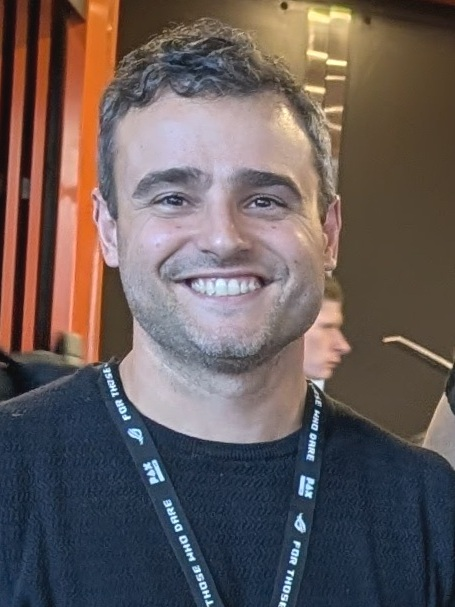
- Pellen at PAX Australia 2024
- Born: William Adam Victor Pellen; 1985 or 1986 (age 40–41); Adelaide, South Australia, Australia
- Education: TAFE SA
- Occupations: Web designer; game designer
- Years active: 2008-present
- Notable work: Hollow Knight; Hollow Knight: Silksong
- Children: 2 (Note: A third expected as of August 2025)

William Adam Victor Pellen (born 1985 or 1986) is an Australian video game designer and former web designer. He is the co-founder and co-director of the indie game development studio Team Cherry, which developed the highly successful and acclaimed titles Hollow Knight (2017) and Hollow Knight: Silksong (2025).

From 2008 to 2011, Pellen worked at Optus, later working as a freelance and employed web designer. As a hobby, he developed small indie games such as the flash game Return to Booty Grotto (2012) and the cancelled Stencyl-developed Lulanda. Pellen co-founded Team Cherry alongside Ari Gibson in 2014.

== Early life and education ==
William Adam Victor Pellen was born in Adelaide, South Australia, in 1985 or 1986.

Pellen's love for video games began when his father helped him find the wing boots item in Zelda II: The Adventure of Link (1987). He became interested in creating video games even as a child, spending "a lot of time drawing imaginary video game levels", which got him interested in the industry. He notes that one of his earliest forays into actually creating games was using software like RPG Maker. He played around with such software for "years", "without any notion that one day [he] could actually get a job doing it". Pellen earned diplomas of Digital Media and of Website Development from TAFE SA in 2013.

== Career ==
=== 2008–2014: Early work, flash games, and web design ===
Pellen worked for the company Optus from 2008 to 2011, in multiple roles. From 2012 to 2014, he also was a freelance web designer under the website name "Wilco Design", creating websites for clients such as the Lake Albert Caravan Park. Pellen additionally worked for the company Inprint Design Adelaide as a web designer from 2013 to 2014. In a 2021-published interview, Ari Gibson recalled him as being the "lynchpin [of] the entire operation" at an unnamed company he formerly worked for as a web designer, which Pellen stated he believed had closed by then.

As a hobby, Pellen created small indie games, not expecting game development "to become much more than that". His first released game was Return to Booty Grotto (2012), an action game where players control a fish. Made in Adobe Flash, It was the only completed game he released prior to co-founding Team Cherry. Lulanda, a Stencyl-made 2D platformer with two demos released, and the Game & Watch-inspired Wilco LCD Classics were also in development, but went unreleased. Pellen later recounted that he had been working "part-time for a while" by 2014.

=== 2013–present: Team Cherry and professional game design ===
In 2013, Pellen was contacted by his longtime friend Ari Gibson, who, after seeing his work on small platformers, suggested that they enter the 27th Ludum Dare. Its theme was 10 seconds, leading them and friend Rohan Fraser to develop Hungry Knight under the team name "Team Cherry", to poor reception. Later in 2013, they released the small game Tomb Cat. In 2014, a game jam with the theme of "Beneath the Surface" began, with Pellen and Gibson planning to reuse Hungry Knight's protagonist for it. Despite missing the deadline, Pellen and Gibson kept discussing possibilities of games they thought could fit. They remained invested in the idea, resulting in the development of a full game, Hollow Knight, starting. In November, they started a Kickstarter project for Hollow Knight; it was a success. The game was released in February 2017 to critical acclaim. Described by Game Informer as "Hollow Knight's game designer", Pellen co-directed and co-wrote with Gibson.

Prior to the release of Hollow Knight, Pellen and Gibson began early work on a piece of downloadable content starring Hornet as the protagonist, which eventually evolved into a sequel, Hollow Knight: Silksong. The game's development took over seven years, though Pellen described the process as enjoyable. Silksong released in September 2025, also to critical acclaim. Both titles' large success has given Pellen substantial wealth and an "inestimable peace of mind", with Hollow Knight and Silksong having sold roughly 15 and 7 million copies by late 2025 respectively.

In a 2020 interview with Edge, it was confirmed that Pellen and Gibson were in the very early stages of developing a non–Hollow Knight game, one then only existing through ideas shared in a Google Doc. Pellen described the game as "something we get to explore". In a 2025 Bloomberg interview, it was implied that his and Gibson's next game would not be a Hollow Knight one. In 2019 and 2023, Team Cherry filed trademarks for "Fearless Fox", which gaming news journalists took as a likely indication of an upcoming non–Hollow Knight game project by Pellen and Gibson with this title.

== Personal life ==
Pellen is married, and has two children, with a third on the way as of August 2025. His future-wife supported him financially during development of Hollow Knight. He maintains a close relationship with his parents, with them both being active in Hollow Knight Facebook groups, and involved in voice acting for his games. He met Gibson through mutuals in the early 2000s.

Pellen owns a Twitter account, "little bomey", that he uses to shitpost. In January 2025, the account posted a cryptic tweet and changed multiple other aspects, leading fans to believe he was creating an ARG hinting at April 2nd, the date of a then-upcoming Nintendo Direct. While later denied by Team Cherry marketing manager Matthew Griffin, Silksong did appear at the direct.

=== Philanthropy ===
In 2021, Pellen co-founded The Trustee for Team Cherry Foundation alongside Gibson and Edward Bernard; they serve as directors, and the foundation consistently reports A$1,000,000 in "donations and bequests" annually, alongside occasionally investment revenue. The foundation is self-described as "providing funds to underprivileged and vulnerable South Australians through other charities".

== Ludography ==
Year	Title
2012	Return to Booty Grotto
2013	Hungry Knight
2013	Tomb Cat
2017	Hollow Knight
2025	Hollow Knight: Silksong
TBA	Untitled non–Hollow Knight game

Cancelled games

Title
Lulanda
Wilco LCD Classics
