= Hornet (Hollow Knight) =

Character from Hollow Knight

- Hollow Knight character
- Promotional art by Ari Gibson (2017)
- First appearance: Hollow Knight (2017)
- Created by: Ari Gibson; William Pellen
- Designed by: Ari Gibson
- Voiced by: Makoto Koji

In-universe information
- Species: Arachnid hybrid
- Gender: Female

Hornet is a fictional character created by Australian independent developer Team Cherry, who first appears as a boss in the video game Hollow Knight (2017), and later as the playable protagonist of its sequel, Hollow Knight: Silksong (2025). She is a warrior arachnid and princess of Hallownest, who acts as its protector.

Hornet was created and is written by Team Cherry's co-founders and co-directors, Ari Gibson and William Pellen. She is drawn by Gibson, and voiced by Makoto Koji. Team Cherry have stated her role as the Silksong protagonist drove many aspects of the game, such as its enemy design and characters.

Since her introduction in Hollow Knight, Hornet has been given praise, especially for her role as the protagonist of Silksong. Critics laud elements such as her character development, her having more personality than Hollow Knight's protagonist, and her showcase of both ruthless and compassionate aspects.

== Appearances ==
In the lore of Hollow Knight, prior to the events of the first game, Hornet was born from a cross between the wyrm king of Hallownest, the Pale King, and the weaver Herrah the Beast, as a result of a deal made between them, where Herrah would be able to have a child, but in turn become a "Dreamer", one of three beings who entered an eternal sleep to seal the Hollow Knight and contain the Infection. This led her to spend little time with her mother. Unlike the Pale King's other children, who are genderless, empty "vessels" born to contain the mind-controlling Infection, Hallownest's plague, she is referred to as "the Gendered Child", and cannot contain the infection. She was raised in Deepnest, and was trained in the Hive by its late Hive Queen Vespa. Hornet survived the fall of the Kingdom and remained unaffected by the Infection, staying sane.

=== Hollow Knight ===
A screenshot of the Knight battling Hornet for the first time in Hollow Knight

In Hollow Knight, Hornet wanders the kingdom, testing escaped vessels to see if they can successfully defeat the Hollow Knight, the current vessel holding the Infection, and replace it, while also protecting the kingdom from invaders. She confronts the protagonist (often known as "the Knight" (Note: This is the name that developers use when referring to the protagonist outside of the game.)) on two occasions, starting boss battles. After her second defeat, she places her trust in the Knight, soon saving it from getting crushed by rubble.

Once the Knight kills Herrah in order to remove her seal on the Black Egg during traditional progression, Hornet can be seen mourning her depending on the player's progress through other parts of the game. If the player has achieved certain steps to unlock the alternate endings, Hornet later decides to help the protagonist defeat the Hollow Knight, which is located in the Black Egg, appearing near the end of the fight to open part of the Hollow Knight's shell.

Hornet's fate from that point on depends on the player's choice. If the Knight uses the Dream Nail on the Hollow Knight, entering the Hollow Knight's dreams to defeat the Radiance, Hornet later awakens and discovers the Knight's broken mask near her, its fate implied. In an alternate ending, if the Knight does not use the Dream Nail and continues attacking the Hollow Knight, Hornet and the Knight are sealed with the infection in the Temple, with her face appearing on the entrance. In the "Embrace the Void" DLC ending, which ends without entering the Black Egg, Hornet readies her guard upon seeing the Hollow Knight leave the Egg, before the cutscene fades to black.

=== Hollow Knight: Silksong ===
In Silksong, Hornet is kidnapped and brought to the unfamiliar kingdom of Pharloom. Throughout the game, she discovers her connection to the kingdom, grows attached to and assists the bugs of Pharloom, battles foes such as Lace—whom she later saves—and eventually is able to leave and free Pharloom from its "Haunting", getting rescued by the Knight and its fellow vessels in the game's "true" ending, "Sister of the Void". Alternatively, her fate differs in other endings: she becomes the new ruler of Pharloom in "Weaver Queen", replacing the antagonist Grand Mother Silk, and in "Twisted Child", which occurs when the game is completed while Hornet is under the effect of a dangerous curse, she intertwines with Grand Mother Silk, creating a tree with petrified versions of them both.

== Concept and creation ==
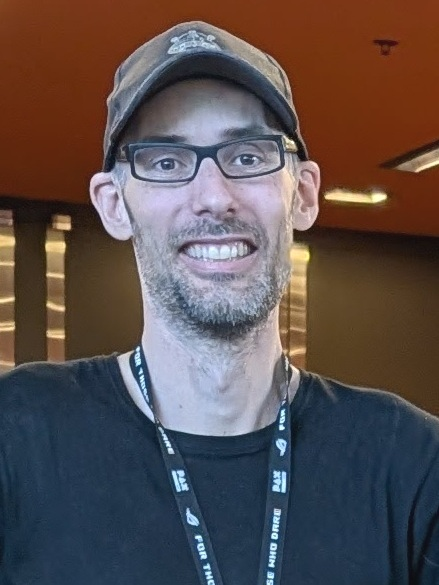
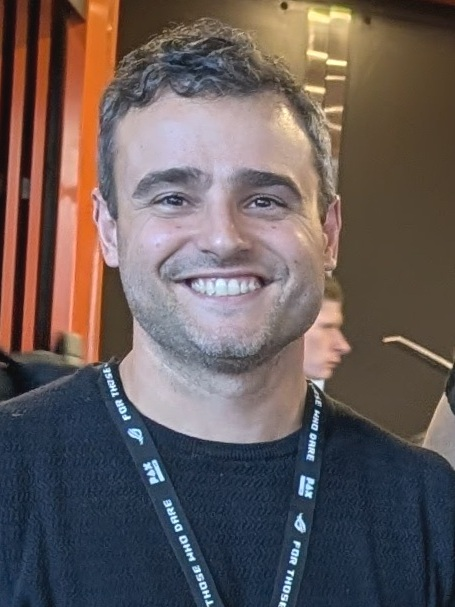
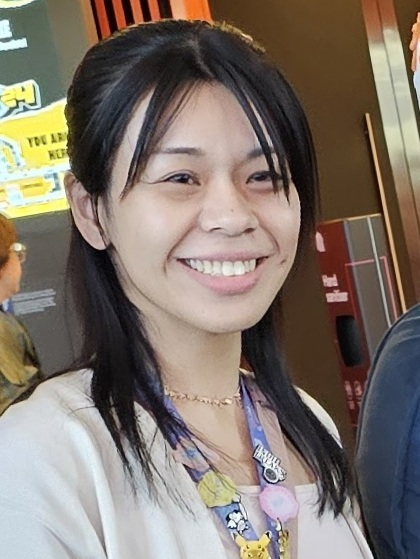
Ari Gibson (left), William Pellen (center), Makoto Koji (right).

Hornet was created by Ari Gibson and William Pellen, the co-founders and co-directors of Team Cherry, who also wrote her dialogue, and was drawn by Gibson. She is voiced by Japanese animator and Gibson's partner Makoto Koji, who voiced her by "making up [her] own gibberish" that felt "natural" and "instinctual". She believes that "the voice [and] sounds of the character ... is only the final icing on the cake". Gibson and Pellen state that Hornet's voice lines are meant to be in a fictional language, with lines like "Gek tu".

Sketches of Hornet by Gibson.

Pellen describes Hornet as being a "natural rival character", which made him feel like she was a "natural pick" for a playable character, also calling her the "secondary protagonist" of Hollow Knight, due to her being "closely linked to [the] core narrative thread", and Gibson describes her as having "natural qualities that lend her to being a fun video game character, [such as her] agile, quick, deadly style", which made him want to make her playable, also calling her a "character of extremes", which influenced her healing in Silksong. Her height is cited as being a major reason why Silksong was expanded from a Hollow Knight DLC to its own game, as she would not naturally fit as the player character in Hollow Knight's world of Hallownest. Her speed and skillset are described as being why enemies in Silksong were more complex than enemies in Hollow Knight, with Gibson stating "Hornet is inherently faster and more skillful than the Knight—so even the base level enemy had to be more complicated, more intelligent". Pellen stated that she is "quite different [to the Knight] because she can speak; she's a much more direct character", making Silksong have traditional quests and more characters.

== Reception ==
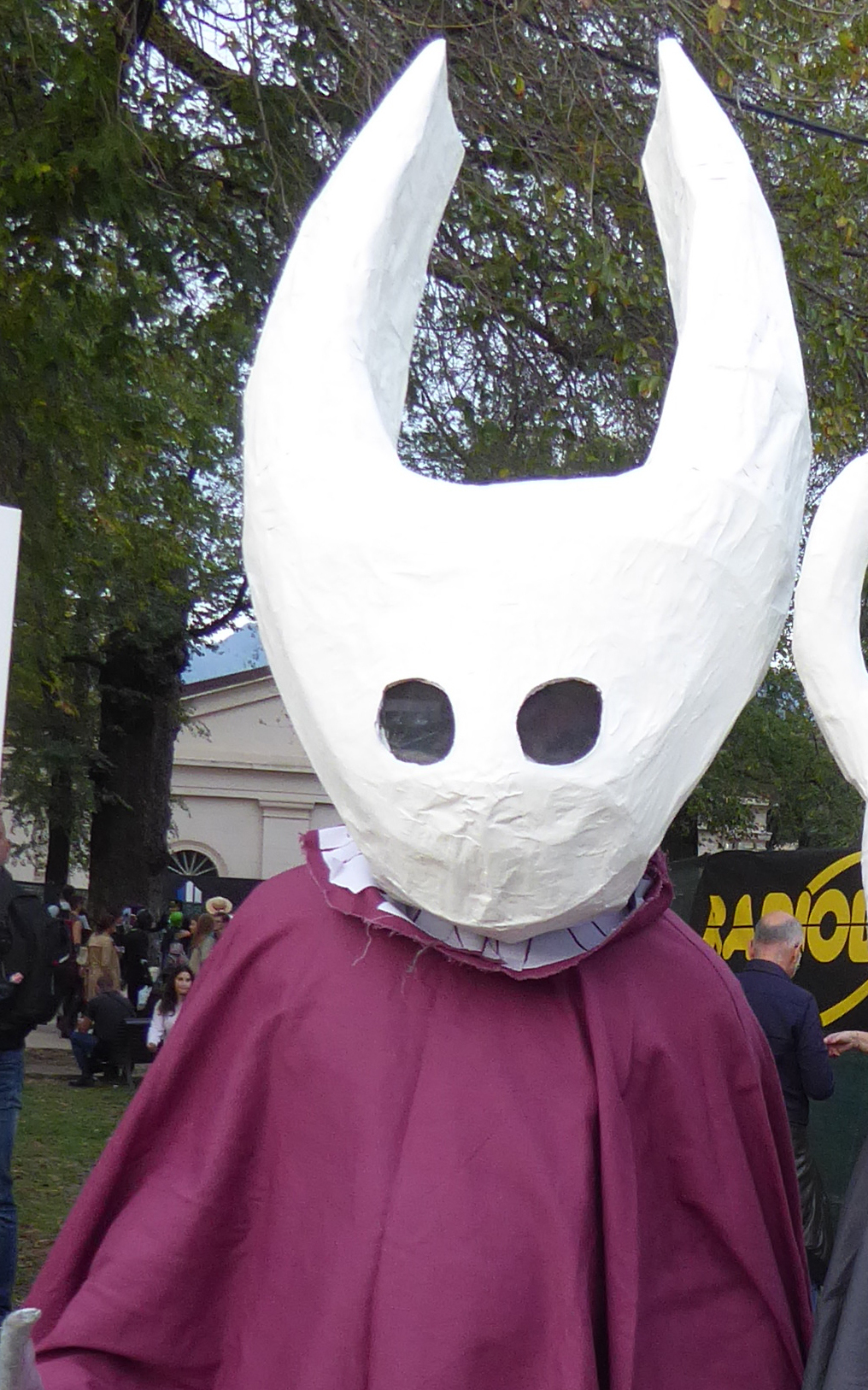
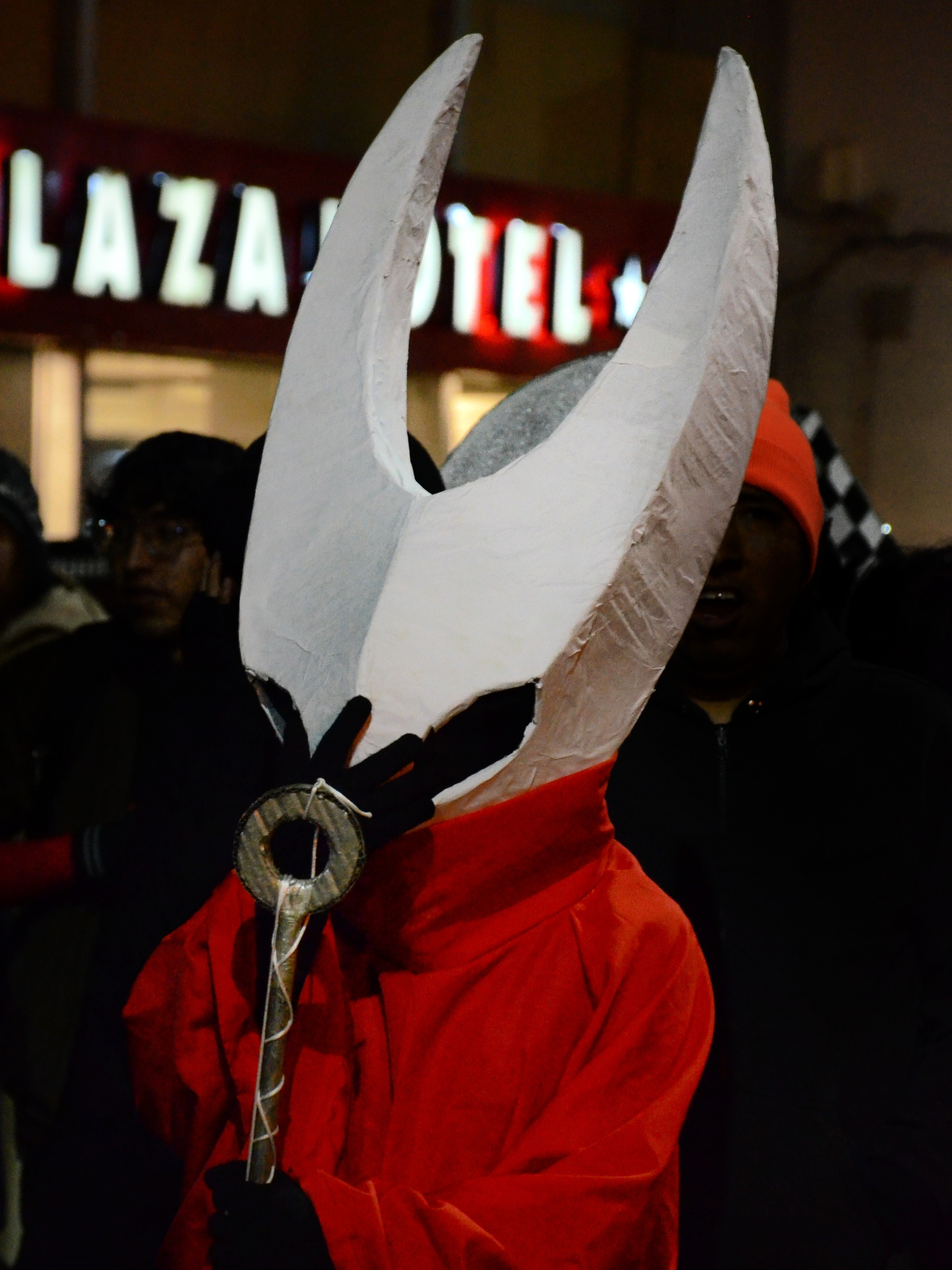
Cosplay of Hornet in 2019 and 2026 respectively

Hardcore Gamer writer Callum Marshall called Hornet's first battle in Hollow Knight "a real rite of passage", stating that it "forces you to master all your basic controls and movement mechanics", and ranking it as the game's 22nd hardest battle, calling her attacks "all quite hard to read". TheGamer ranked Hornet's second fight as the game's 12th hardest, believing that it "is putting your skills to the test to decide if you're actually worthy enough to proceed forward and into the final steps of the game." Rachel Watts of PCGamesN described Hornet's first encounter as being what made her take a break, and later install cheats. GameSpot's Jordan Ramée believed that "a huge part of [the plot] is the slow realization that Hornet should be Hallownest's savior", writing "her qualifications far outpace the [Knight]. But she can't be the one who saves Hallownest because she's a person with a mind, a will, and a voice. [She] cannot ever be a true hollow knight. The aspects that make her special make her a liability".

IGN writer Tom Marks called Hornet an "excellent hero" in Silksong, describing her as "polite but stern, reserved but not cold", and praising her "top-notch writing". Writing for NME, Will Bedingfield enjoyed her "sharp, amusingly standoffish dialogue", stating that it makes her a much more compelling protagonist than the silent Knight. Likewise, Digital Spy writer Jess Lee found Hornet to be "more interesting" compared to the Knight, calling her one of the main reasons she connected with Silksong. Austin Wood of GamesRadar+ wrote that the optional Slab kidnapping sequence built her character, writing "recovering who and what she was is a guiding theme for Hornet's character in many ways, and The Slab is a major milestone here. In a world that tries to take from her from the onset, Hornet finds ways to give back, repaying kindness and attacks in kind."

AV Club writer Maddy Myers praised her character development throughout Silksong, writing "although she starts off wary of almost everyone—even the bugs who try to help her—Hornet learns, over time, that there are bugs she can trust in this strange world, and that helping people feels good, actually", calling her a protagonist "who's so easy to relate to", and stating that her constant dialogue "significantly improves [Silksong's] storytelling and emotional pull". PC Gamer's Tyler Colp enjoyed "Hornet's tendency to soften from cold-blooded warrior to empathetic survivor when confronted with a bug-in-need or a fluffy flea", stating it "added a tender counterpoint to the most abrasive moments [of Silksong]". GamingBolt writer Ravi Sinha thought that "much of [Silksong's] success lies with Hornet's character", noting that "she's chivalrous and polite [but] can also be blunt and downright threatening". Nicole Clark of Mothership described her "compassion" as being "the heart of Silksong".

Alana Hagues, writing for Nintendo Life, described Hornet as one of the main reasons Silksong is "so gosh-darned cute", stating "she’s cool, she's stoic, and she's both elegant and direct in her speech [but] she's also a massive goofball." Hagues highlighted lighthearted aspects of her character, such as her love of "fluffy" creatures. In a separate piece about how "women are the heart of Hollow Knight: Silksong", Hagues writes that "Hornet herself is the perfect hero for Silksong's narrative, [as she is] one defined by systems of oppression, of familial and generational trauma", and that she "display[s] confidence and pragmatism while always treating everyone with respect", noting that "even when her eventual rival, Lace, taunts her on their first meeting, she does not mock her back".

Josh Broadwell of Polygon criticized Hornet, mainly for the ludonarrative dissonance between the player and her. In his article, Broadwell states that "Hornet isn't learning or changing on her journey", having no purpose beyond getting home and developing no attachment to any character the player chooses to help. He also writes that Team Cherry "cast Hornet as a passive participant in almost every case", which he called their "biggest misstep"; and that "she's just along for the ride, in the passenger seat of her own story". Broadwell describes her observations in her "few" dialogue lines as "terribly bland".

Writing for Rock Paper Shotgun, Oisin Kuhnke praised Hornet's voice lines in Hollow Knight, discussing a "charming" mod that reimplements them into Silksong, while also admitting that hearing the lines for a long period of time could get grating. On this topic, PC Gamer's Joshua Wolens initially disliked their removal and praised the mod, but later stated "if there's one thing I've taken from [it], it's that actually Team Cherry might have had a reason for yoinking her voice away when players are in control of her", calling them "annoying" during combat. Wood solely praised the mod, calling it "essential".

Alessandro Barbosa of GameSpot thought that Team Cherry took inspiration from Alucard's animations in Castlevania: Symphony of the Night (1997)—a game they have played—for Hornet's animations, noting her backstep as especially "look[ing] almost ripped out of Konami's classic and endearingly recreated." Polygon's Patricia Hernandez praised her "silly" Silksong float animation used for the Drifter's Cloak ability, calling it "outstanding" despite it not being "technically impressive", stating that it "brings some much-needed whimsy to a game that is otherwise full of cruelties".
