= Folding Ideas =

Canadian documentarian

Dan Olson
- Olson in 2025
- Born: June 22-25, 1981 or 1982 (age 43–44); Calgary, Alberta
- Education: Southern Alberta Institute of Technology
- Years active: 2010–present

YouTube information
- Channel: @FoldingIdeas
- Genres: Video essay, Documentary
- Subscribers: 1.06 million
- Views: 127 million
- Dan Olson's voice Recorded 2013
- Last updated: March 21, 2026

Dan Olson (born June 1981 or 1982), known online as Folding Ideas, is a Canadian documentarian who covers topics including media criticism, conspiracies, and financial culture. Olson's work has been received positively by critics, with Line Goes Up – The Problem with NFTs as a noted work. Scholar Christina Wurst labeled Folding Ideas a part of LeftTube.

== Content ==
Olson published his first video in 2010, beginning as a pop culture YouTuber. He analyzed the way films, such as Triumph of the Will and Fight Club, communicated certain moral values. In the videos "Annihilation and Decoding Metaphor" and "The Thermian Argument", Olson criticized tendencies to focus on the literal elements of a creative work to the detriment of less literal elements like metaphor. Vox writer Emily St. James and Polygon writer Ben Kuchera praised "Folding Ideas - #GamerGate", a video where Olson analyzed the motives of the Gamergate movement. In 2018, Olson published a three-part series analyzing Fifty Shades franchise, where Olson argued that the films promoted unsafe kink practices and dynamics. Polygon writer Wil Williams included it in their list of the "best of the best" video essays, calling it "refreshingly kink-positive" and praising its analysis of the first film as "shockingly fair".

Fellow YouTubers Doug Walker and James Rolfe were also the subjects of Folding Ideas videos. In his video reviewing Rolfe's work, Olson also reflected on his own position relative to Rolfe and why he felt the need to review Rolfe's work. Reviewer Jack Benjamin called its commentary "empathetic and insightful" and "exemplary to critics on YouTube and beyond".

In 2020, Olson published "In Search of a Flat Earth", where he performs an experiment at Lake Minnewanka showing the Earth's curvature before pivoting into the origins of flat Earth theories, linking them to QAnon-style conspiracies. Williams and Jef Rouner of Datebook noted the video's shots of the Canadian landscape as beautiful. Rouner compared the video to Q: Into the Storm, calling Olson's video a "far more useful take".

Olson has also covered financial culture. In 2022, Olson investigated Publishing.com, which provides a course that purportedly allows its students to earn passive income through the use of a ghostwriter. Olson argued that the books produced through this process had poor factual accuracy and gave the ghostwriters extremely low pay.

In April 2026, Olson released a video about his October 2025 tour of MrBeast's studios where he and other invitees watched the then-unreleased season 2 of Beast Games. He explains his confusion over why he specifically was invited, discusses many criticisms of Beast Games and other MrBeast ventures, and points out how a staff member asked "How do you create fandom?" which Olson argues highlights an anxiety of lack of lasting engagement and impact with the MrBeast brand.

=== Line Goes Up – The Problem with NFTs ===
Line Goes Up, Olson's most viewed work, criticized the utility of non-fungible tokens, decentralized autonomous organizations, and cryptocurrency. The video was published to his YouTube channel on January 21, 2022.

Olson traces the early history of Web3 through the 2008 Great Recession and the creation and early history of Bitcoin and Ethereum before reviewing concepts, technologies, and economics of cryptocurrency. Olson then covers the history and technologies behind NFTs while arguing that they mainly exist to bring more people into the cryptocurrency industry. Olson criticizes the quality of NFT art. In the latter half of the video, Olson examines the Crypto and NFT community while also criticizing blockchain games, the "play to earn" gaming business model (focusing on Axie Infinity in particular), and decentralized autonomous organizations (DAOs). He concludes the video by arguing that the core of the Web3 movement is a "turf war" between the top 5% and 1%, and the market is based on a multi-level marketing style of pitch that if you "buy in now, you can be the next tech millionaire." He takes the stance that no matter how bad the current system is, NFTs, cryptocurrencies, and blockchains are the beginning of a worse system intent on making everything have a speculative price.

In an interview with Vice, Olson stated he followed the rise of Bitcoin hearing claims that it would reach mass adoption, though after using it, he believed that cryptocurrency was not functional and that it was only viable because its price kept on increasing over time. Olson later came to believe that the history of cryptocurrency was a story about the evolution of fraud. He later became skeptical of new developments in crypto technology, viewing them as overpromising, and this drove feelings of frustration and anger that drove the creation of the video. Olson stated he started writing the video in April 2021, only to shelve it until the fall of 2021 because of rapid developments during this period, which made his written material quickly obsolete. The video was released in January 2022.

==== Release and reception ====
As of November 2026, the documentary had 19 million views with 444 thousand likes. After the video essay's release it trended on Twitter and several media outlets such as NPR and The Verge interviewed Olson for his expertise on NFTs and cryptocurrency. The Verge's Casey Newton noted "few of Olson's criticisms are entirely new, though the collective force of Olson's arguments is substantial." The New York Times calls it "a two-hour exegesis on the flaws with NFTs and crypto."

Two critics highlighted it in the 2022 Sight and Sound video essay poll. José Sarmiento said it was the best video essay of the year; Jason Mittell reviewed that it was prescient, comprehensive and "utterly captivating and convincing" but questioned whether its length was necessary. The following year, Olson's essay on a related topic—"The Future is a Dead Mall"—was nominated in the poll.
