= Matthew Griffin (game designer) =

American game designer and marketer (born 1979)

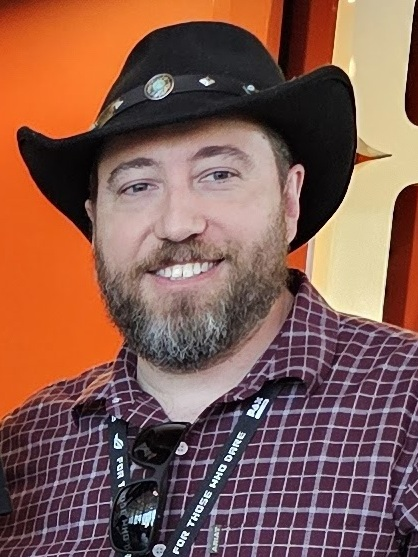
- Griffin at PAX Australia 2024
- Born: Matthew Alexander Griffin; March 27, 1979 (age 47); United States
- Education: CSU Sacramento; Cosumnes River College
- Occupations: Game designer; marketer
- Years active: 1998-present
- Children: 1

Matthew Alexander "Leth" Griffin (born March 27, 1979) is an American video game designer, marketer, and former teacher. He is best known for working as a marketing contractor for indie games such as Team Cherry's Hollow Knight and Hollow Knight: Silksong and Mongoose Rodeo's Crowsworn.

Early in his career, Griffin worked in sales and customer service, later becoming a full-time mathematics teacher. Griffin began creating video games using Game Maker in the early 2000s, and started working Jason Gordy. In 2006, they formed Team Wanderlust (later Yeti Trunk), which released multiple games between 2011 and 2015. Outside of his own games, Griffin worked with the game publisher Chucklefish on titles such as Risk of Rain (2013). In 2015, they hired him as a publishing manager. After departing the company, he began working as a marketing contractor for indie studios like Team Cherry.

== Early life and education ==
Matthew Alexander Griffin (Note: Resume file linked in "Wanderlust: Rebirth Official Website". Archived from the original on 30 May 2012.) was born in the United States on March 27, 1979.

Growing up in a small town in central California, he initially self-taught himself how to program with a game creation system and QBasic at a young age, later taking programming classes with C++ after graduating high school. He obtained a bachelor's degree in philosophy and minor in mathematics from CSU Sacramento with honors, and a two-year associate's degree in programming from Cosumnes River College.

== Career ==
=== 1998–2015: Early work and game design ===
Before entering the gaming industry full-time, in the late 1990s–2000s, Griffin worked in sales and customer service before becoming a mathematics educator, his job as of 2012.

A "fairly well-known member of the Game Maker Community" in the early 2000s, Griffin began working with pixel artist Jason Gordy on the RPG Wanderlust: The Online Adventure in 2004, which was cancelled due to a lack of direction. In 2006, Griffin and Gordy formed Team Wanderlust, later renamed Yeti Trunk, which released Wanderlust: Rebirth (2011), a redesigned successor to the cancelled title, Gubs (2012), Puck Bang (2013), and Wanderlust Adventures (2015). The company Chucklefish published Wanderlust Adventures, and Griffin also worked on games it partnered with, including Risk of Rain (2013) and Witchmarsh (TBA). For Risk of Rain, he worked on adding online multiplayer to the game, an addition the developers said was made possible due to him.

=== 2015–present: Marketing and publishing ===
In June 2015, Chucklefish brought on Griffin as their publishing manager. At Chucklefish, he helped publish and market Interstellia (2015) and Stardew Valley (2016). He also led the localization for Stardew Valley. Griffin later left Chucklefish, and in mid 2016, Australian independent developer Team Cherry brought him on as their marketing and publishing manager for their then-upcoming Kickstarter-backed title, Hollow Knight, later released in February 2017. He also led the localization of the game, playtested it, and voice acted some characters.

He continued his partnership with Team Cherry for their next game, Hollow Knight: Silksong (2025), where he managed marketing and publishing, helped playtest the game, and voice acted. He also gave updates on the game's development over the years, and revealed information about it, as Team Cherry themselves stayed mostly silent during development. In mid 2021, Canadian independent developer Mongoose Rodeo brought on Griffin to manage marketing and publishing for their upcoming Kickstarter-backed game Crowsworn (TBA). In 2026, he formally announced that he is marketing for NEO TITAN (TBA), developed by British independent developer idoz & phops. He joined the team after contacting them once seeing an early build online in 2023.

== Public image ==
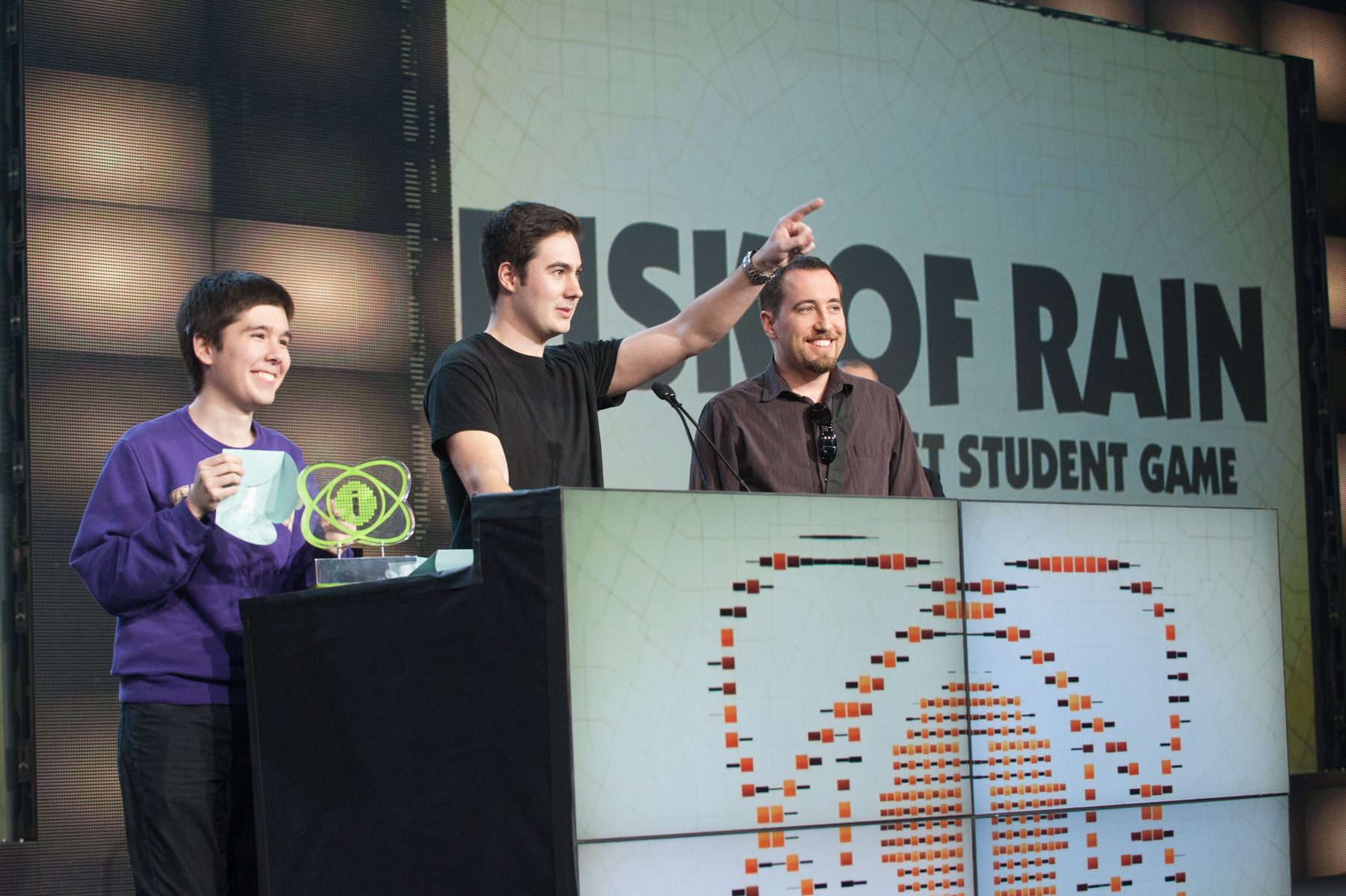
Griffin (right) and other Risk of Rain developers accepting an award at the 2014 Independent Games Festival.

Griffin's early games received mixed reviews. Andrew Barker of RPGFan gave Wanderlust: Rebirth a 60/100, criticizing its combat, soundtrack, and lack of character progression. Wanderlust Adventures received positive attention in previews from Rock Paper Shotgun: Emily Gera praised its variety of environments, while Adam Smith described its presentation as "absolutely smashing". Griffin's multiplayer work on Risk of Rain was also received positively, with Quintin Smith of Eurogamer calling the multiplayer "robust", although Philip Kollar of Polygon criticized its lag and setup requirements. The game received the Best Student Game award at the 2014 Independent Games Festival, an award that he accepted at the event (pictured).

During Silksong's lengthy development, Griffin's communication drew coverage from gaming news outlets. Imogen Beckhelling, writing for Rock Paper Shotgun, praised his Discord riddles in mid 2020 that revealed Silksong characters, calling it "a nice way to keep fans entertained until bigger news comes out." IGN reported that in May 2021, Griffin deconfirmed any possible Silksong appearances at E3 of that year, which they said was praised for its transparency. TheGamer reported on reactions to Griffin indirectly deconfirming a theorized ARG via a YouTuber in early 2025, which they said some called "unprofessional".

PC Gamer writer Harvey Randall was mixed on Griffin confirming a pre-Holiday 2025 release in Discord, stating "[Team Cherry is] under no obligation to do things the traditional way... but... maybe if you want your game to be successful, this isn't a very good way to make your dreams come true?" Conversely TheGamer's Sam Woods was more positive, stating "Thankfully, Griffin clarified things ... at least ... fans [now] have a little something to cling onto, [now] knowing the game will release in the next few months." The book Level Up 2026: An AFK Book by Dynamo Limited ranked Griffin's statement that Silksong was “real, progressing, and will release” at No. 2 in its list of the top 30 greatest gaming moments of 2025.

In May 2026, Griffin made gaming news headlines after he responded to a satirical tweet that claimed Silksong's upcoming Sea of Sorrow downloadable content (DLC) would be releasing that month according to "reliable sources" with a monocle emoji. Some news outlets and fans speculated that this response could have been teasing a DLC release in May, but this did not occur.

== Personal life ==
Griffin currently lives in Texas. He is married, and has a daughter. As a hobby, he enjoys music composition and plays the guitar.

== Ludography ==
Year	Title
2011	Wanderlust: Rebirth
2012	Gubs
2013	Puck Bang
2013	Risk of Rain
2015	Wanderlust Adventures
TBA	Witchmarsh

Cancelled games

Title
Wanderlust: The Online Adventure
