= Hollow Knight =

2017 video game

- Key art since 2026
- Developer: Team Cherry
- Publisher: Team Cherry
- Directors: Ari Gibson; William Pellen
- Designers: Ari Gibson; William Pellen
- Programmers: William Pellen; David Kazi; Jasmine Vine
- Artist: Ari Gibson
- Writers: Ari Gibson; William Pellen
- Composer: Christopher Larkin
- Series: Hollow Knight
- Engine: Unity
- Platforms: Windows; Linux; macOS; Nintendo Switch; PlayStation 4; Xbox One; Nintendo Switch 2; PlayStation 5; Xbox Series X/S
- Release: Windows; 24 February 2017; Linux, macOS; 11 April 2017; Nintendo Switch; 12 June 2018; PlayStation 4, Xbox One; 25 September 2018; Nintendo Switch 2, PlayStation 5, Xbox Series X/S; 5 February 2026
- Genre: Metroidvania
- Mode: Single-player

Hollow Knight is a 2017 Metroidvania video game developed and published by Australian independent development studio Team Cherry. The player controls a nameless insectoid warrior (commonly known as "The Knight" (Note: This is the name that the developers use when referring to the protagonist outside of the game.)) in exploring Hallownest, a fallen kingdom plagued by a supernatural disease. The game is set in diverse subterranean locations, featuring friendly and hostile insectoid characters and numerous bosses. Players have the opportunity to unlock abilities as they explore, along with pieces of lore and flavour text that are spread throughout the kingdom.

The concept behind Hollow Knight was conceived in 2013 in the Ludum Dare game jam. Adelaide-based Team Cherry—founded by artist Ari Gibson and web designer William Pellen—wanted to create a game inspired by older platformers that replicated the explorational aspects of its influences. Inspirations for the game include Faxanadu, Metroid, Zelda II: The Adventure of Link, and Mega Man X. Development was partially funded through a crowdfunding campaign that raised over A$57,000 by the end of 2014. It was released for Linux, macOS, and Windows in early 2017, for the Nintendo Switch, PlayStation 4, and Xbox One in 2018, and for the Nintendo Switch 2, PlayStation 5, and Xbox Series X/S in 2026. Between 2017 and 2018, four free downloadable expansions were released.

Hollow Knight was well-received by critics, with particular praise for its music, art style, worldbuilding, atmosphere, combat, and level of difficulty. It has since been regarded by some critics as one of the greatest games of all time. (Note: As cited by: IGN, Rolling Stone, GQ, Sports Illustrated, The Independent, and GamingBolt.) The game has sold more than 15 million copies. A sequel following major character Hornet, Hollow Knight: Silksong, was released in September of 2025 to commercial success and critical acclaim.

== Gameplay ==
Gameplay screenshot of the player fighting the boss False Knight

Hollow Knight is a 2D side-scrolling Metroidvania. The player controls a silent insectoid warrior who explores an underground fallen kingdom called Hallownest. The player character can strike enemies with a sword-like Nail and can learn spells that allow for long-range attacks.

The player has a limited number of hit points, which are represented by masks. By striking enemies, the player character gains Soul, which is stored in a "Soul Vessel". Initially, the player can only use Soul to "Focus" which regenerates masks, but as the game progresses, players unlock and collect several offensive spells, which consume Soul. Soul can also be used for some charms which are in-game boosters that help The Knight. If all masks are lost, the player dies, and a Shade appears at the approximate location of the player's death, marked on the map. The player loses all Geo, the game's main currency, and can only hold a reduced amount of Soul; they must defeat the Shade to recover lost Geo and regain their lost Soul capacity. If the player dies before the Shade is defeated, a new Shade appears, erasing the previous one alongside the Geo it was holding.

During the game, the player encounters bug-themed non-player characters (NPCs) with whom they can interact. These characters provide information about the plot, offer aid, and sell items or services. Players acquire items that provide movement abilities including an additional mid-air jump, adhering to and jumping off walls, or a dash. To further customise the Knight, players can equip various charms, which can be found or purchased from NPCs. Some of their effects include improved combat abilities, such as granting the player more range with the Nail, or allowing them to collect Soul more easily. Equipping a charm takes up a certain number of limited slots, called charm notches. Many areas feature challenging enemies and bosses that the player may need to defeat to progress. Defeating some bosses grants the player access to new abilities. If the player defeats the final boss, they are given access to a game mode called "Steel Soul". In this mode, dying is permanent, i.e. if the player loses all of their masks, the save slot will be reset.

The kingdom of Hallownest consists of several large, interconnected areas with unique themes. With its nonlinear gameplay Metroidvania design, Hollow Knight does not restrict the player to one path nor require them to explore the whole world; there are places that can be missed when finishing the game. The player may need to acquire a specific movement ability, skill, or item to progress further, at certain points. To fast travel through the world, the player can use progressively-unlocked Stag Stations, terminals connected to a network of tunnels that are traversed via a giant stag beetle.

== Plot ==
At the outset, the player-controlled insectoid warrior arrives at Dirtmouth, a quiet town that sits just above the remains of the kingdom of Hallownest. As the protagonist ventures through the ruins, they learn that Hallownest was once a kingdom of insects which fell after becoming overrun with "The Infection", a supernatural disease that can control the minds of bugs, driving them to madness and undeath. Hallownest's ruler, The Pale King, had previously attempted to lock away the Infection in the Temple of the Black Egg. Despite the temple's magical seals, the disease managed to escape, and Hallownest fell into ruin. The protagonist's mission is to find and kill three bugs called the Dreamers, who act as the living seals on the temple door. Once the seals have been removed, the protagonist may confront the source of the Infection. The protagonist frequently encounters Hornet, the daughter of the Pale King, who tests the protagonist's combat prowess in battle.

Through dialogue with non-player characters, environmental imagery, and writings scattered throughout Hallownest, the protagonist learns the origins of the Infection. In ancient times, a tribe of moths that lived in Hallownest worshipped the Radiance, a primordial being who could control the minds of other bugs. When the Pale King arrived at Hallownest from afar, he used his powers to give sapience and knowledge to the creatures of the realm. The moths joined the bugs of Hallownest in worshipping the king, causing the Radiance to fall into obscurity. Beneath the notice of the Pale King, some worship of the Radiance continued, allowing her to remain alive inside the Dream Realm.

Hallownest prospered until the Radiance began appearing in the dreams of its people, poisoning their minds with the Infection. In an attempt to contain the Infection, the Pale King used a living substance called the Void to create the Vessels, creatures made to contain the Infection within their own bodies. The Pale King chose a Vessel called the Hollow Knight to trap the Radiance within itself, leaving the others locked in a pit called the Abyss. After the Hollow Knight was locked within the Temple of the Black Egg, the Radiance persisted within the Vessel, weakening the temple's seals and allowing the Infection to escape.

Throughout the game, it is revealed that the protagonist was a Vessel who managed to escape the Abyss. They gradually defeat the Dreamers and their guardians, removing the seals on the door. Inside, they encounter and battle with the infected Hollow Knight. Depending on the player's actions throughout the game, multiple endings can be achieved. These include the protagonist defeating the Hollow Knight and taking its place containing the Infection, another where they defeat the Hollow Knight with Hornet's assistance, and the third ending where the Knight uses the Void Heart charm to control the Void, allowing them to attack and defeat the Radiance inside the Dream Realm.

=== The Grimm Troupe expansion ===
In the second expansion to Hollow Knight, a "Nightmare Lantern" was added to the Howling Cliffs area. After striking a masked bug with the Dream Nail, the lantern summons a mysterious group of circus performers to Dirtmouth, who identify themselves as the Grimm Troupe. Their leader, Troupe Master Grimm, gives the player a quest to collect magic flames throughout Hallownest in order to take part in a "twisted ritual", feeding off the nightmares of the dying kingdom to keep the Nightmare Heart alive. He gives the player the Grimmchild charm, which creates a small creature reminiscent of the Troupe Master when equipped; when it later absorbs the flames into itself, the ritual is progressed, and the Grimmchild gains the ability to attack the player's enemies. Eventually, the player must choose to either complete the ritual by fighting Grimm in his powerful Nightmare King form or prevent the ritual and banish the Grimm Troupe with the help of Brumm, a traitorous troupe member.

=== Godmaster expansion ===
More content was added to Hollow Knight with the fourth and final expansion, Godmaster, in which the player unlocks a new area, Godhome, which includes several boss rushes, and the Hall of Gods, a hallway of statues of the game's bosses, which, upon being selected, allow a rematch. The expansion focuses on the Godseekers, a tribe of bugs from a faraway land, abandoned by their gods. After obtaining the Godtuner, the Knight can help the Godseekers attune to the gods of Hallownest by completing five Pantheons, each containing a set of bosses that must all be defeated consecutively without dying. The final Pantheon, the Pantheon of Hallownest, contains every boss in the game or alternate forms of original bosses. If the player completes the Pantheon of Hallownest, the Absolute Radiance, a more powerful version of the Radiance, appears, acting as the new final boss. Upon defeating her, two unique endings can be achieved in which the player transforms into a powerful Void creature and destroys Godhome.

== Development ==
Gameplay screenshot of Hungry Knight, featuring the first appearance of Hollow Knight's protagonist

The idea that prompted the creation of Hollow Knight originated in a game jam, Ludum Dare 2013, in which two of the game's developers, Ari Gibson and William Pellen, developed a game called Hungry Knight, whose main character's design eventually became the protagonist in Hollow Knight, kills bugs to stave off starvation. The game, considered "not very good", used to hold a 1/5 star rating on Newgrounds, but has since increased to 4/5. The developers decided to work on another game jam with the theme "Beneath the Surface", but missed the deadline. However, the concept gave them the idea to create a game with an underground setting, a "deep, old kingdom", and insect characters.

Influences for the game include Faxanadu, Metroid, Zelda II: The Adventure of Link, and Mega Man X. Team Cherry noted that Hallownest was in some ways the inverse of the world tree setting in Faxanadu. The team wanted to replicate the sense of wonder and discovery of games from their childhood from such games, in which there "could be any crazy secret or weird creature." Believing that control of the character was most important for the player's enjoyment of the game, the developers based the player's movement on Mega Man X. They gave the character no acceleration when moving horizontally, as well as a large amount of aerial control and the ability to interrupt one's jump with a dash. This was meant to make the player feel that any hit they took could have been avoided right up until the last second.

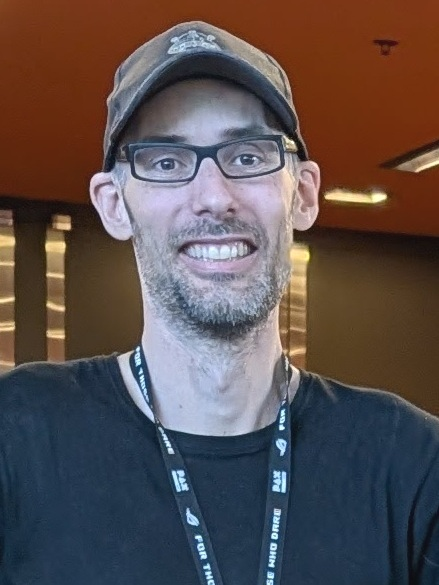
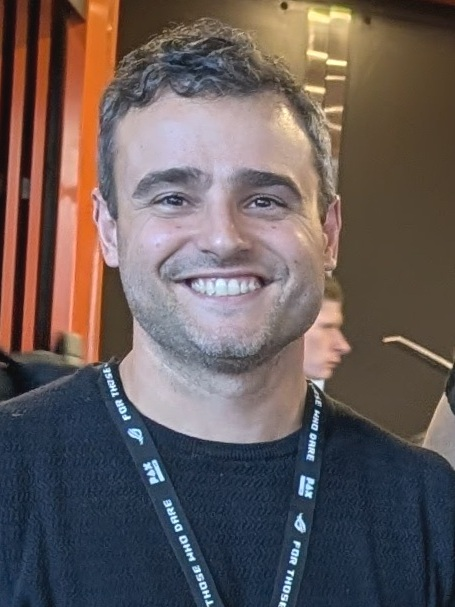
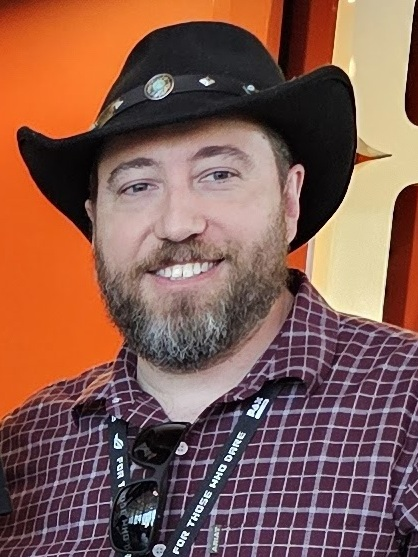
Main developers Ari Gibson (left) and William Pellen (center), and marketing contractor Matthew Griffin (right), who was brought on in 2016.

To create the game's art, Gibson's hand-drawn sketches were scanned directly into the game engine, creating a "vivid sense of place". The developers decided to "keep it simple" in order to prevent the development time from becoming extremely protracted. The complexity of the world was based on Metroid, which allows players to become disoriented and lost, focusing on the enjoyment of finding one's way. Only basic signs are placed throughout the world to direct players to important locations. The largest design challenge was creating the mapping system and finding a balance between not divulging the world's secrets while not being too player-unfriendly.

Hollow Knight was revealed on Kickstarter in November 2014, with a goal of A$35,000. The game passed this goal, raising more than A$57,000 from 2,158 backers, allowing its scope to be expanded and another developer to be hired—technical director David Kazi—as well as composer Christopher Larkin, and marketing and publishing manager Matthew Griffin. The game reached a beta state in September 2015 and continued to achieve numerous stretch goals to add in more content after an engine switch from Stencyl to Unity.

== Release ==
Hollow Knight was released for Windows on 24 February 2017, with versions for Linux and macOS being released on 11 April of the same year.

The Nintendo Switch version of Hollow Knight was announced in January 2017 and released on 12 June 2018. Team Cherry originally planned to make it available on the Wii U. Development of the Wii U version began in 2016, alongside the PC version, and it eventually shifted to the Nintendo Switch following the Wii U's discontinuation. The creators of Hollow Knight worked with another Australian developer, Shark Jump Studios, to speed up the porting process. Initially, Team Cherry planned the Switch version to arrive "not too long after the platform's launch"; subsequently they delayed it to early 2018. A release date was not announced until the Nintendo Direct presentation at E3 2018 on 12 June 2018, when it was unveiled the game would be available later that day via Nintendo eShop.

Versions for PlayStation 4 and Xbox One were released as Hollow Knight: Voidheart Edition on 25 September 2018. A Nintendo Switch 2 edition of the game was announced in December 2025, having the same higher frame rates and resolutions as Hollow Knight: Silksong, for release in 2026. The Nintendo Switch 2 edition was released following a Nintendo Direct Partner Showcase on 5 February 2026, alongside versions for PlayStation 5 and Xbox Series X/S. The PC version was also updated, adding support for ultrawide monitors.

A Hollow Knight Piano Collections sheet music book and album was released in 2019 by video game music label Materia Collective, arranged by David Peacock and performed by Augustine Mayuga Gonzales.

=== Downloadable content ===
On 3 August 2017, the Hidden Dreams free downloadable content (DLC) was released, featuring two optional boss encounters, two songs in the soundtrack, a new fast travel system, and a Stag Station to discover. On 26 October 2017, the second free DLC The Grimm Troupe was released, adding major quests, boss fights, charms, enemies, and other content. The update added support for Russian, Portuguese, and Japanese languages. On 20 April 2018, the Lifeblood free update was released, bringing various optimisations, changes to the colour palette, bug fixes, minor additions as well as a new boss fight. On 23 August 2018, the final free DLC, Godmaster was released, containing characters, boss fights, music, a game mode called Godseeker as well as two endings. It was renamed from its former title of Gods and Glory due to trademark concerns. All four DLC packs are free.

== Reception ==
Reception

Aggregate scores
Aggregator	Score
Metacritic	PC: 87/100; NS: 90/100; PS4: 85/100; XONE: 89/100
OpenCritic	97% recommend

Review scores
Publication	Score
Destructoid	10/10
Eurogamer	Recommended
Famitsu	8/10, 9/10, 8/10, 9/10
IGN	9.4/10
Nintendo Life	9/10
Nintendo World Report	10/10
PC Gamer (US)	92/100
PC PowerPlay	8/10
VideoGamer.com	8/10

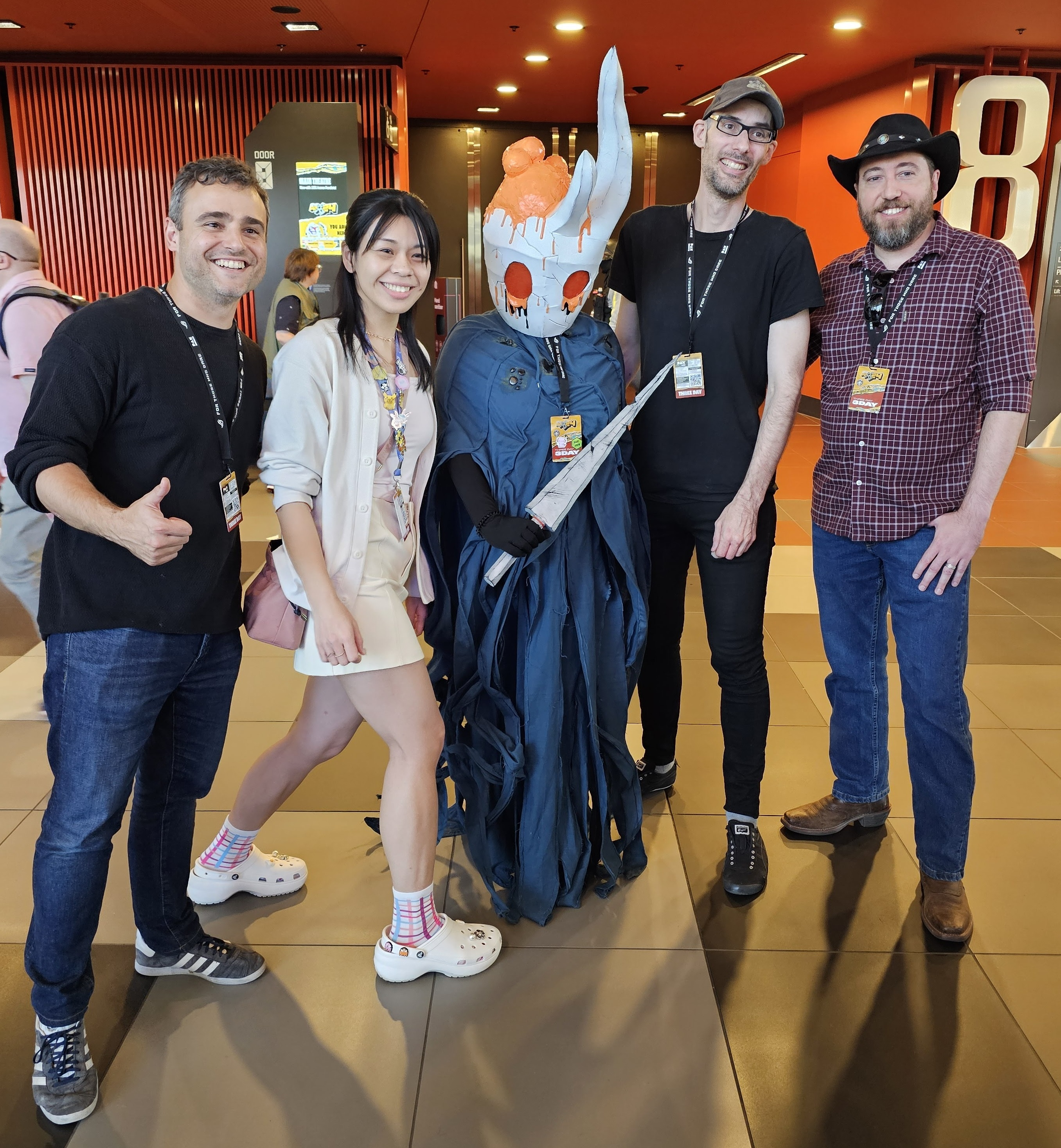
Fan cosplay of the Broken Vessel boss at PAX Australia 2024, pictured alongside Team Cherry members and contractors

Hollow Knight's PC, PlayStation 4, and Xbox One versions received "generally favorable" reviews and the Nintendo Switch version received "universal acclaim", according to review aggregator website Metacritic. OpenCritic determined that 97% of critics recommended the game. Jed Whitaker of Destructoid praised it as a "masterpiece of gaming" and, on PC Gamer, Tom Marks called it a "new classic". IGN praised Hollow Knight's visuals, sound, music, and "a million other details" in building atmosphere.

Critics recognised the combat system as simple and nuanced; they praised its responsiveness, or "tightness", similarly to the movement system. On IGN, Marks stated: "The combat in Hollow Knight is relatively straightforward, but starts out tricky ... It rewards patience and skill massively". In his review on PC Gamer, Marks praised the "brilliant" charm system: "What's so impressive about these charms is that I could never find a 'right' answer when equipping them. There were no wrong choices." Adam Abou-Nasr from NintendoWorldReport stated: "Charms offer a huge variety of upgrades ... removing them felt like trading a part of myself for a better chance at an upcoming battle."

The difficulty of Hollow Knight received attention from reviewers and was described as challenging; Vikki Blake of Eurogamer called the game "ruthlessly tough, even occasionally unfair". For Nintendo World Report's Adam Abou-Nasr it also seemed unfair—he had "'so frustratingly hard that I cannot recommend this game' angrily scrawled in [his] notes"—but "it eventually clicked". Whitaker "never found any of the bosses to be unfair". Destructoid and Nintendo World Report reviewers felt a sense of accomplishment after difficult fights. Critics also made comparisons to the Dark Souls series, noting the mechanic of losing currency on death and having to defeat a Shade to regain it. Destructoid praised this feature, as well as the holding down of a button to heal, because "[t]hey circumvent a couple of issues games have always had, namely appropriate punishment for failing, and a risk-reward system".

=== Sales ===
Hollow Knight had sold over 500,000 copies by November 2017 and surpassed 1 million in sales on PC platforms on 11 June 2018, one day before being released on Nintendo Switch, where it sold over 250,000 copies in the two weeks after its launch. By July 2018 it had sold over 1.2 million copies. By February 2019, Hollow Knight had sold over 2.8 million copies. As of August 2025, it had sold more than 15 million copies.

=== Awards ===
The game was nominated for "Best PC Game" in Destructoid's Game of the Year Awards 2017, and for "Best Platformer" in IGN's Best of 2017 Awards. It won the award for "Best Platformer" in PC Gamer's 2017 Game of the Year Awards. Polygon later named the game among the decade's best.

Year	Award	Category	Result	Ref.
2017	SXSW Gamer's Voice Awards 2017	Gamer's Voice (Single Player)	Nominated	
2017	The Game Awards 2017	Best Debut Indie Game	Nominated	
2017	Australian Screen Sound Guild 2017	Best Sound For Interactive Media	Won	
2018	Game Developers Choice Awards	Best Debut (Team Cherry)	Nominated	
2018	14th British Academy Games Awards	Debut Game	Nominated	
2018	Golden Joystick Awards	Nintendo Game of the Year	Nominated	
2018	Australian Games Awards	Independent Game of the Year	Won	
2018	Australian Games Awards	Australian Developed Game of the Year	Won	
2019	National Academy of Video Game Trade Reviewers Awards	Art Direction, Fantasy	Nominated	
2019	National Academy of Video Game Trade Reviewers Awards	Character Design	Nominated	
2019	National Academy of Video Game Trade Reviewers Awards	Design, New IP	Won	
2019	National Academy of Video Game Trade Reviewers Awards	Game, Original Action	Nominated	

== Sequel and other media ==
Release timeline Full games in bold
2017	**Hollow Knight**
2017	Hollow Knight: Hidden Dreams
2017	Hollow Knight: The Grimm Troupe
2018	Hollow Knight: Lifeblood
2018	Hollow Knight: Godmaster
2019
2020
2021
2022
2023
2024
2025	**Hollow Knight: Silksong**
2026	Hollow Knight: Silksong - Sea of Sorrow
TBA	Further Hollow Knight: Silksong DLC

A sequel, Hollow Knight: Silksong, was announced in February 2019 and released on 4 September 2025. Set after the events of the original game, the sequel revolves around the character Hornet exploring the kingdom of Pharloom. Hollow Knight: Silksong features a similar combat style to the original game, but with several gameplay differences. The player character Hornet is more mobile than Hollow Knight's protagonist, and Charms are replaced with the more elaborate Tool and Crest system. The game was previously planned as DLC for the original game, but it became an individual title after its content grew too large. As with the original game, Silksong will receive its own DLC releases, starting with Sea of Sorrow in 2026.

A tie-in comic book, Hollow Knight First Chapter: Quirrel, was released in 2017. It is a 14-page prequel comic that follows Hollow Knight supporting character Quirrel, as he journeys to Hallownest, setting up his role in the game itself. A book focused on the universe of Hollow Knight, Wanderer's Journal, was released in 2019 and features colored art of the game's characters and environments. It was created by Kari Fry and Ryan Novak in collaboration with Team Cherry. It is sold by Fangamer.
