= Jason Schreier =

American video game journalist (born 1987)

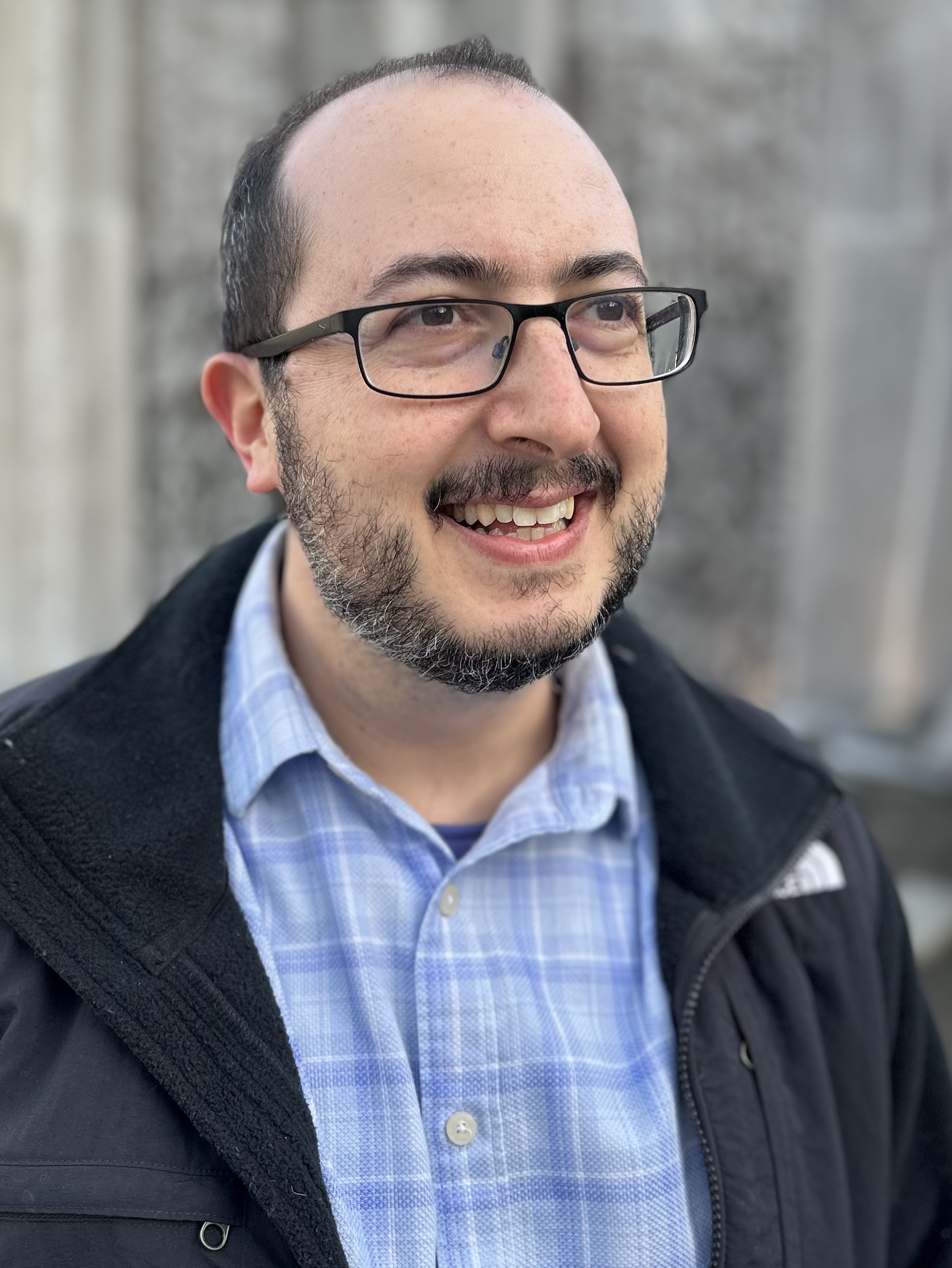
- Schreier in 2025
- Born: May 10, 1987 (age 39)
- Education: New York University
- Occupations: Journalist, author
- Years active: 2010–present
- Employer: Bloomberg News
- Known for: Video game journalism
- Spouse: Amanda Coleman (m. 2018)
- Schreier's voice Schreier on 2017 video games thus far Recorded April 2017

Jason Schreier (born May 10, 1987) is an American journalist and author who primarily covers the video game industry. He worked as a news reporter for Kotaku from 2011 to 2020 and was recognized for several investigative stories, particularly on the crunch culture within the industry. In April 2020, Schreier joined the technology focus team at Bloomberg News.

== Early life ==
Jason Schreier was born on May 10, 1987. He attended the Gallatin School of Individualized Study at New York University (NYU), graduating with a degree in writing in 2009.

== Career ==
=== Early career ===
Schreier initially worked as a freelance journalist covering local news stories. He worked for Wired from 2010 to 2012, covering video games and related technology. Other freelance work included a weekly column at Joystiq on Japanese role-playing games, and works published at Kill Screen, Edge, Eurogamer, G4TV, GamesRadar, and Paste.

=== At Kotaku ===
Around 2011, Schreier was contacted by Stephen Totilo, the editor-in-chief for the website Kotaku, offering him a position as a full-time news reporter. Kotaku had been founded in 2004 as the video game front under Gawker Media. Schreier accepted the position, which he started around the same time. He was promoted to news editor for the site prior to his departure.

Besides standard reporting on video game news, Schreier gained an early reputation at Kotaku for getting stories from developers about their inside processes for various titles. Schreier found common stories of excessive use of "crunch time" by some developers and the use of excessive overtime over multiple weeks and months to make sure a video game was completed by a target date. While crunch time had been identified before in larger firms from other sources, such as at Rockstar Games, Schreier's reporting identified crunch also tended to persist at smaller studios.

In 2017, Schreier wrote a book about the video game creation process titled Blood, Sweat, and Pixels: The Triumphant, Turbulent Stories Behind How Video Games Are Made.

A 2017 podcast interview with Schreier focusing on his role at the time as Kotaku's editor, and video games as a whole

In addition to working conditions, Schreier wrote stories on the development histories of troubled or canceled video games, typically through reporting from anonymized workers. His articles included the stumbling blocks that Bungie overcame for Destiny, for the planned Star Wars game Project Ragtag at Visceral Games that eventually led to the studio's closure, and the difficulties behind Electronic Arts's and BioWare's Anthem.

Schreier's reporting on Bethesda Softworks, such as his 2013 story on the cancellation of Prey 2 that relayed internal communications he had been provided, is believed to have led Bethesda to "blacklist" Kotaku, denying the site any pre-release copies of their games or interviews at trade events since 2015. Schreier and Hello Games founder Sean Murray received death threats after Schreier reported on inside news that the highly anticipated No Man's Sky from Hello Games would be delayed by a few months.

As a result of the Bollea v. Gawker lawsuit, the Gawker Network including Kotaku underwent a series of ownership changes after 2016, eventually falling under the G/O Media family in 2019. The new G/O management was more demanding of what content the sites carried, which resulted in a major incident at Deadspin, the network's sports-oriented site, in October 2019 leading to the firing of its editor in chief and subsequent quitting of most of the remaining editorial staff. This propagated across the other former Gawker sites, including Kotaku. Schreier left Kotaku in April 2020, specifically identifying issues with G/O Media management and the October 2019 Deadspin issue as his reasons for leaving. Schreier said of his reason for departure, "I’ve been through a lot of cataclysmic shifts because it always felt like, through it all, we were guided by people who always cared about journalism, and unfortunately, I'm not sure that’s the case anymore."

=== At Bloomberg News ===
Shortly after leaving Kotaku, Schreier took a position as reporter at Bloomberg News in April 2020. There, he continued to cover the video game industry and game development.

While at Bloomberg, Schreier wrote his second book, Press Reset: Ruin and Recovery in the Video Game Industry, related to the volatility of the video game industry, which was released in May 2021. The book was a New York Times bestseller for non-fiction during the week of May 30. Play Nice, his third book, documenting the history of Blizzard Entertainment, was released in October 2024.

=== Podcasts ===
Schreier is one of the co-hosts of the podcast Triple Click with former Kotaku co-workers Kirk Hamilton and Maddy Myers. It is hosted on the Maximum Fun network.

== Personal life ==
Schreier lives in the New York City area. He is Jewish. On June 24, 2018, Schreier married Amanda Coleman, a litigation associate at Cravath, Swaine & Moore, whom he had met at NYU.

== Bibliography ==
- Schreier, Jason (2017). Blood, Sweat, and Pixels: The Triumphant, Turbulent Stories Behind How Video Games Are Made. Harper. ISBN 9780062651235.
- Schreier, Jason (2021). Press Reset: Ruin and Recovery in the Video Game Industry. Grand Central Publishing. ISBN 9781538735480.
- Schreier, Jason (October 8, 2024). Play Nice: The Rise, Fall, and Future of Blizzard Entertainment. Grand Central Publishing. ISBN 978-1538725429.
