= TheGamer =

Video game website

- Website type: News website
- Founded: 2017
- Headquarters: Canada
- Owner: Valnet
- Key people: Kirk McKeand, Stacey Henley
- Website: www.thegamer.com
- Users: 7 million+ (monthly readers)
- Current status: Active

TheGamer is a news website launched in 2017 by media company Valnet. The website reports on and reviews video games. It is based in Canada.

== History ==
TheGamer was launched in 2017 by Valnet as news website covering gaming. In 2020, TheGamer chose former VG247 editor Kirk McKeand as its editor-in-chief. Valnet said that the website has grown in popularity since its launch, claiming its visited by 7 million users monthly. TheGamer said that it supports diversity and has published articles discussing issues such as intersectionality, racism and transphobia.

In July 2021, Kirk McKeand said that TheGamer will not cover games created by Activision Blizzard to protest its alleged bad work environment. In February 2023, new editor-in-chief Stacey Henley announced that TheGamer won’t review or report on Hogwarts Legacy to protest J.K. Rowling's views on transgender people. On April 4, 2023, TheGamer along with other publications were nominated for 2023 MCV/Develop Awards as "Media Brand of the Year".

In October 2025, various editors of TheGamer were fired due to mass layoffs. In an interview, the editors said that sections of the website's editorial team have been “decimated”. Both affected and remaining employees of TheGamer shared information about the incident on social media, claiming the directive came from Valnet. In May 2026, Valnet announced a new payment system for some of TheGamer editors, calling it “Pay Per Session". Depending on their role in writing the article, editors will be paid between $3 and $8 if it gets a thousand visits. In an interview with Aftermath, editors said that the salaries of employees working under the new system had been drastically reduced, one described it as a "form of soft-layoffs”. Former editor of TheGamer and editor-in-chief of Startmenu Lex Luddy told Kotaku that half of TheGamer's editors were in “open revolt” against the website's higher ups due to the new payment system.
