= César Award for Best Foreign Film =

Film award

- Country: Canada / France
- Presented by: Académie des Arts et Techniques du Cinéma
- First award: 1976
- Currently held by: One Battle After Another (2026)
- Website: academie-cinema.org

The Académie des arts et techniques du cinéma, sponsored by France and Canada, presents an annual César Award for Best Foreign Film (French: César du meilleur film étranger). This is the list of winners and nominees of the award since the 1970s.

== Winners and nominees ==
=== 1970s ===
Year	Winner and nominees	Original title	Country	Director
1976 (1st)	Scent of a Woman	Profumo di donna	Italy	Dino Risi
1976 (1st)	Aguirre, the Wrath of God	Aguirre, der Zorn Gottes	West Germany	Werner Herzog
1976 (1st)	The Magic Flute	Trollflöjten	Sweden	Ingmar Bergman
1976 (1st)	Nashville		United States	Robert Altman
1977 (2nd)	We All Loved Each Other So Much	C'eravamo tanto amati	Italy	Ettore Scola
1977 (2nd)	Barry Lyndon		United Kingdom/ United States	Stanley Kubrick
1977 (2nd)	One Flew Over the Cuckoo's Nest		United States	Miloš Forman
1977 (2nd)	Raise Ravens	Cría cuervos	Spain	Carlos Saura
1978 (3rd)	A Special Day	Una giornata particolare	Italy	Ettore Scola
1978 (3rd)	The American Friend	Der amerikanische Freund	West Germany	Wim Wenders
1978 (3rd)	Annie Hall		United States	Woody Allen
1978 (3rd)	Bread and Chocolate	Pane e cioccolata	Italy	Franco Brusati
1979 (4th)	The Tree of Wooden Clogs	L'albero degli zoccoli	Italy	Ermanno Olmi
1979 (4th)	Autumn Sonata	Höstsonaten	Sweden	Ingmar Bergman
1979 (4th)	Julia		United States	Fred Zinnemann
1979 (4th)	A Wedding		United States	Robert Altman

=== 1980s ===
Year	Winner and nominees	Original title	Country	Director
1980 (5th)	Manhattan		United States	Woody Allen
1980 (5th)	Apocalypse Now		United States	Francis Ford Coppola
1980 (5th)	Hair		United States	Miloš Forman
1980 (5th)	The Tin Drum	Die Blechtrommel	West Germany	Volker Schlöndorff
1981 (6th)	Shadow Warrior	影武者 / Kagemusha	Japan	Akira Kurosawa
1981 (6th)	Fame		United States	Alan Parker
1981 (6th)	Kramer vs. Kramer		United States	Robert Benton
1981 (6th)	The Rose		United States	Mark Rydell
1982 (7th)	The Elephant Man		United Kingdom/ United States	David Lynch
1982 (7th)	The Circle of Deceit	Die Fälschung	West Germany	Volker Schlöndorff
1982 (7th)	Raiders of the Lost Ark		United States	Steven Spielberg
1982 (7th)	Man of Iron	Człowiek z żelaza	Poland	Andrzej Wajda
1983 (8th)	Victor/Victoria		United Kingdom/ United States	Blake Edwards
1983 (8th)	E.T. the Extra-Terrestrial		United States	Steven Spielberg
1983 (8th)	The French Lieutenant's Woman		United Kingdom	Karel Reisz
1983 (8th)	The Way	Yol	Turkey	Serif Gören and Yilmaz Güney
1984 (9th)	Fanny and Alexander	Fanny och Alexander	Sweden	Ingmar Bergman
1984 (9th)	Carmen		Spain	Carlos Saura
1984 (9th)	The Gods Must Be Crazy		South Africa	Jamie Uys
1984 (9th)	Tootsie		United States	Sydney Pollack
1985 (10th)	Amadeus		United States	Miloš Forman
1985 (10th)	Greystoke: The Legend of Tarzan, Lord of the Apes		United Kingdom/ United States	Hugh Hudson
1985 (10th)	Maria's Lovers		United States	Andrei Konchalovsky
1985 (10th)	Paris, Texas		West Germany	Wim Wenders
1986 (11th)	The Purple Rose of Cairo		United States	Woody Allen
1986 (11th)	Desperately Seeking Susan		United States	Susan Seidelman
1986 (11th)	The Killing Fields		United Kingdom	Roland Joffé
1986 (11th)	Ran	乱	Japan	Akira Kurosawa
1986 (11th)	Year of the Dragon		United States	Michael Cimino
1987 (12th)	The Name of the Rose	Il nome della rosa	Italy/ West Germany	Jean-Jacques Annaud
1987 (12th)	After Hours		United States	Martin Scorsese
1987 (12th)	Hannah and Her Sisters		United States	Woody Allen
1987 (12th)	The Mission		United Kingdom	Roland Joffé
1987 (12th)	Out of Africa		United States	Sydney Pollack
1988 (13th)	The Last Emperor		United Kingdom/ Italy/ China	Bernardo Bertolucci
1988 (13th)	Dark Eyes	Oci ciornie	Italy/ Soviet Union	Nikita Mikhalkov
1988 (13th)	Intervista		Italy	Federico Fellini
1988 (13th)	The Untouchables		United States	Brian De Palma
1988 (13th)	Wings of Desire	Der Himmel über Berlin	West Germany	Wim Wenders
1989 (14th)	Bagdad Cafe	Out of Rosenheim	West Germany	Percy Adlon
1989 (14th)	Bird		United States	Clint Eastwood
1989 (14th)	Salaam Bombay!	सलाम बॉम्बे	India	Mira Nair
1989 (14th)	Who Framed Roger Rabbit		United States	Robert Zemeckis

=== 1990s ===
Year	Winner and nominees	Original title	Country	Director
1990 (15th)	Dangerous Liaisons		United States	Stephen Frears
1990 (15th)	Cinema Paradiso	Nuovo cinema Paradiso	Italy	Giuseppe Tornatore
1990 (15th)	Rain Man		United States	Barry Levinson
1990 (15th)	Sex, Lies, and Videotape		United States	Steven Soderbergh
1990 (15th)	Time of the Gypsies	Дом за вешање, Dom za vešanje	SFR Yugoslavia	Emir Kusturica
1991 (16th)	Dead Poets Society		United States	Peter Weir
1991 (16th)	Goodfellas		United States	Martin Scorsese
1991 (16th)	Pretty Woman		United States	Garry Marshall
1991 (16th)	Taxi Blues	Такси-блюз / Taksi-Blyuz	Soviet Union	Pavel Lungin
1991 (16th)	Tie Me Up! Tie Me Down!	¡Átame!	Spain	Pedro Almodóvar
1992 (17th)	Toto the Hero	Toto le héros	Belgium/ France/ Germany	Jaco van Dormael
1992 (17th)	Alice		United States	Woody Allen
1992 (17th)	Close to Eden	У́рга — территория любви	Soviet Union	Nikita Mikhalkov
1992 (17th)	Dances with Wolves		United States	Kevin Costner
1992 (17th)	The Silence of the Lambs		United States	Jonathan Demme
1992 (17th)	Thelma & Louise		United States	Ridley Scott
1993 (18th)	High Heels	Tacones lejanos	Spain	Pedro Almodóvar
1993 (18th)	Howards End		United Kingdom	James Ivory
1993 (18th)	Husbands and Wives		United States	Woody Allen
1993 (18th)	The Lover	L'amant	France/ United Kingdom	Jean-Jacques Annaud
1993 (18th)	The Player		United States	Robert Altman
1994 (19th)	The Piano		New Zealand/ Australia	Jane Campion
1994 (19th)	Farewell My Concubine	霸王別姬 / Ba wang bie ji	China/ Hong Kong	Chen Kaige
1994 (19th)	Manhattan Murder Mystery		United States	Woody Allen
1994 (19th)	Raining Stones		United Kingdom	Ken Loach
1994 (19th)	The Snapper		Ireland/ United Kingdom	Stephen Frears
1995 (20th)	Four Weddings and a Funeral		United Kingdom	Mike Newell
1995 (20th)	Dear Diary	Caro diario	Italy	Nanni Moretti
1995 (20th)	Pulp Fiction		United States	Quentin Tarantino
1995 (20th)	Schindler's List		United States	Steven Spielberg
1995 (20th)	Short Cuts		United States	Robert Altman
1996 (21st)	Land and Freedom		United Kingdom	Ken Loach
1996 (21st)	The Bridges of Madison County		United States	Clint Eastwood
1996 (21st)	Smoke		United States	Paul Auster and Wayne Wang
1996 (21st)	Underground	Подземље / Podzemlje	FR Yugoslavia	Emir Kusturica
1996 (21st)	The Usual Suspects		United States	Bryan Singer
1997 (22nd)	Breaking the Waves		Denmark/ United Kingdom	Lars von Trier
1997 (22nd)	Fargo		United States	Joel Coen
1997 (22nd)	The Promise	La promesse	Belgium	Jean-Pierre and Luc Dardenne
1997 (22nd)	Secrets & Lies		United Kingdom	Mike Leigh
1997 (22nd)	The Postman	Il postino	Italy	Michael Radford
1998 (23rd)	Brassed Off		United Kingdom	Mark Herman
1998 (23rd)	The English Patient		United States/ United Kingdom	Anthony Minghella
1998 (23rd)	Everyone Says I Love You		United States	Woody Allen
1998 (23rd)	Hana-bi	はなび	Japan	Takeshi Kitano
1998 (23rd)	The Full Monty		United Kingdom	Peter Cattaneo
1999 (24th)	Life Is Beautiful	La vita è bella	Italy	Roberto Benigni
1999 (24th)	The Celebration	Festen	Denmark	Thomas Vinterberg
1999 (24th)	Central Station	Central do Brasil	Brazil	Walter Salles
1999 (24th)	Saving Private Ryan		United States	Steven Spielberg
1999 (24th)	Titanic		United States	James Cameron

=== 2000s ===
Year	Winner and nominees	Original title	Country	Director
2000 (25th)	All About My Mother	Todo sobre mi madre	Spain	Pedro Almodóvar
2000 (25th)	Being John Malkovich		United States	Spike Jonze
2000 (25th)	Eyes Wide Shut		United States/ United Kingdom	Stanley Kubrick
2000 (25th)	Ghost Dog: The Way of the Samurai		United States	Jim Jarmusch
2000 (25th)	The Thin Red Line		United States	Terrence Malick
2001 (26th)	In the Mood for Love	花樣年華	Hong Kong	Kar Wai Wong
2001 (26th)	American Beauty		United States	Sam Mendes
2001 (26th)	Billy Elliot		United Kingdom	Stephen Daldry
2001 (26th)	Dancer in the Dark		Denmark	Lars von Trier
2001 (26th)	Yi Yi	Yī Yī	Taiwan	Edward Yang
2002 (27th)	Mulholland Drive		United States	David Lynch
2002 (27th)	The Man Who Wasn't There		United States	Joel Coen
2002 (27th)	Moulin Rouge!		Australia	Baz Luhrmann
2002 (27th)	The Son's Room	La stanza del figlio	Italy	Nanni Moretti
2002 (27th)	Traffic		United States	Steven Soderbergh
2003 (28th)	Bowling for Columbine		United States	Michael Moore
2003 (28th)	Minority Report		United States	Steven Spielberg
2003 (28th)	Ocean's Eleven		United States	Steven Soderbergh
2003 (28th)	Painted Fire	취화선 / Chi-hwa-seon	South Korea	Kwon-taek Im
2003 (28th)	Spirited Away	千と千尋の神隠し / Sen to Chihiro no kamikakushi	Japan	Hayao Miyazaki
2004 (29th)	Mystic River		United States	Clint Eastwood
2004 (29th)	Elephant		United States	Gus Van Sant
2004 (29th)	Gangs of New York		United States	Martin Scorsese
2004 (29th)	The Hours		United States/ United Kingdom	Stephen Daldry
2004 (29th)	The Return	Возвращение / Vozvrashcheniye	Russia	Andrei Zvyagintsev
2005 (30th)	Lost in Translation		United States	Sofia Coppola
2005 (30th)	21 Grams		United States	Alejandro González Iñárritu
2005 (30th)	Eternal Sunshine of the Spotless Mind		United States	Michel Gondry
2005 (30th)	Fahrenheit 9/11		United States	Michael Moore
2005 (30th)	The Motorcycle Diaries	Diarios de motocicleta	Argentina/ Brazil	Walter Salles
2006 (31st)	Million Dollar Baby		United States	Clint Eastwood
2006 (31st)	A History of Violence		United States	David Cronenberg
2006 (31st)	Match Point		United Kingdom/ United States	Woody Allen
2006 (31st)	The Sea Inside	Mar adentro	Spain	Alejandro Amenábar
2006 (31st)	Walk on Water	ללכת על המים / Lalekhet Al HaMayim	Israel	Eytan Fox
2007 (32nd)	Little Miss Sunshine		United States	Jonathan Dayton and Valerie Faris
2007 (32nd)	Babel		United States/ Mexico	Alejandro González Iñárritu
2007 (32nd)	Brokeback Mountain		United States	Ang Lee
2007 (32nd)	The Queen		United Kingdom	Stephen Frears
2007 (32nd)	Volver		Spain	Pedro Almodóvar
2008 (33rd)	The Lives of Others	Das Leben der Anderen	Germany	Florian Henckel von Donnersmarck
2008 (33rd)	4 Months, 3 Weeks and 2 Days	4 luni, 3 săptămâni şi 2 zile	Romania	Cristian Mungiu
2008 (33rd)	Eastern Promises		United Kingdom/ Canada	David Cronenberg
2008 (33rd)	The Edge of Heaven	Auf der anderen Seite	Germany/ Turkey	Fatih Akin
2008 (33rd)	We Own the Night		United States	James Gray
2009 (34th)	Waltz with Bashir	ואלס עם באשיר	Israel	Ari Folman
2009 (34th)	Eldorado		Belgium/ France	Bouli Lanners
2009 (34th)	Gomorrah	Gomorra	Italy	Matteo Garrone
2009 (34th)	Into the Wild		United States	Sean Penn
2009 (34th)	Lorna's Silence	Le silence de Lorna	Belgium	Jean-Pierre and Luc Dardenne
2009 (34th)	There Will Be Blood		United States	Paul Thomas Anderson
2009 (34th)	Two Lovers		United States	James Gray

=== 2010s ===
Year	Winner and nominees	Original title	Country	Director
2010 (35th)	Gran Torino		United States	Clint Eastwood
2010 (35th)	Avatar		United States	James Cameron
2010 (35th)	Milk		United States	Gus Van Sant
2010 (35th)	I Killed My Mother	J'ai tué ma mère	Canada	Xavier Dolan
2010 (35th)	A Town Called Panic	Panique au village	Belgium/ France	Stéphane Aubier and Vincent Patar
2010 (35th)	The White Ribbon	Das weiße Band, Eine deutsche Kindergeschichte	Germany/ Austria	Michael Haneke
2010 (35th)	Slumdog Millionaire		United Kingdom	Danny Boyle
2011 (36th)	The Social Network		United States	David Fincher
2011 (36th)	Bright Star		United Kingdom/ Australia	Jane Campion
2011 (36th)	Heartbeats	Les amours imaginaires	Canada	Xavier Dolan
2011 (36th)	Illegal	Illégal	Belgium/ France	Olivier Masset-Depasse
2011 (36th)	Inception		United States/ United Kingdom	Christopher Nolan
2011 (36th)	Invictus		United States; South Africa	Clint Eastwood
2011 (36th)	The Secret in Their Eyes	El secreto de sus ojos	Argentina	Juan José Campanella
2012 (37th)	A Separation	جدایی نادر از سیمین	Iran	Asghar Farhadi
2012 (37th)	Black Swan		United States	Darren Aronofsky
2012 (37th)	Drive		United States	Nicolas Winding Refn
2012 (37th)	Incendies		Canada	Denis Villeneuve
2012 (37th)	Melancholia		Denmark	Lars von Trier
2012 (37th)	The Kid with a Bike	Le gamin au vélo	Belgium	Jean-Pierre and Luc Dardenne
2012 (37th)	The King's Speech		United Kingdom/ Australia	Tom Hooper
2013 (38th)	Argo		United States	Ben Affleck
2013 (38th)	Bullhead	Rundskop	Belgium	Michaël R. Roskam
2013 (38th)	Laurence Anyways		Canada	Xavier Dolan
2013 (38th)	Oslo, August 31st	Oslo, 31. august	Norway	Joachim Trier
2013 (38th)	The Angels' Share		United Kingdom	Ken Loach
2013 (38th)	A Royal Affair	En kongelig affære	Denmark	Nikolaj Arcel
2013 (38th)	Our Children	À perdre la raison	Belgium/ France	Joachim Lafosse
2014 (39th)	The Broken Circle Breakdown		Belgium	Felix Van Groeningen
2014 (39th)	Blue Jasmine		United States	Woody Allen
2014 (39th)	Blancanieves		Spain	Pablo Berger
2014 (39th)	Dead Man Talking		Belgium/ France	Patrick Ridremont
2014 (39th)	Django Unchained		United States	Quentin Tarantino
2014 (39th)	Gravity		United States/ United Kingdom	Alfonso Cuarón
2014 (39th)	The Great Beauty	La grande bellezza	Italy	Paolo Sorrentino
2015 (40th)	Mommy		Canada	Xavier Dolan
2015 (40th)	Boyhood		United States	Richard Linklater
2015 (40th)	12 Years A Slave		United States/ United Kingdom	Steve McQueen
2015 (40th)	Two Days, One Night	Deux jours, une nuit	Belgium/ France	Jean-Pierre and Luc Dardenne
2015 (40th)	Winter Sleep	Kış Uykusu	Turkey	Nuri Bilge Ceylan
2015 (40th)	Ida		Poland	Pawel Pawlikowski
2015 (40th)	The Grand Budapest Hotel		United States	Wes Anderson
2016 (41st)	Birdman		United States	Alejandro González Iñárritu
2016 (41st)	Son of Saul	Saul fia	Hungary	László Nemes
2016 (41st)	I'm Dead but I Have Friends	Je suis mort mais j'ai des amis	Belgium/ France	Guillaume Malandrin and Stéphane Malandrin
2016 (41st)	Mia Madre		Italy	Nanni Moretti
2016 (41st)	Taxi	تاکسی	Iran	Jafar Panahi
2016 (41st)	The Brand New Testament	Le Tout Nouveau Testament	Belgium/ France	Jaco Van Dormael
2016 (41st)	Youth	Youth - La giovinezza	Italy/ United Kingdom	Paolo Sorrentino
2017 (42nd)	I, Daniel Blake		United Kingdom	Ken Loach
2017 (42nd)	Aquarius		Brazil	Kleber Mendonça Filho
2017 (42nd)	Graduation	Bacalaureat	Romania	Cristian Mungiu
2017 (42nd)	The Unknown Girl	La Fille inconnue	Belgium/ France	Luc Dardenne and Jean-Pierre Dardenne
2017 (42nd)	It's Only the End of the World	Juste la fin du monde	Canada/ France	Xavier Dolan
2017 (42nd)	Manchester by the Sea		United States	Kenneth Lonergan
2017 (42nd)	Toni Erdmann		Germany/ Austria	Maren Ade
2018 (43rd)	Loveless	Нелюбовь	Russia	Andrey Zvyagintsev
2018 (43rd)	The Nile Hilton Incident	حادث النيل هيلتون	Sweden/ Egypt	Tarik Saleh
2018 (43rd)	Dunkirk		United Kingdom/ United States	Christopher Nolan
2018 (43rd)	La La Land		United States	Damien Chazelle
2018 (43rd)	The Square		Sweden	Ruben Östlund
2018 (43rd)	A Wedding	Noces	Belgium; France; Pakistan	Stephan Streker
2019 (44th)	Shoplifters	万引き家族	Japan	Hirokazu Kore-eda
2019 (44th)	Girl		Belgium	Lukas Dhont
2019 (44th)	Three Billboards Outside Ebbing, Missouri		United States/ United Kingdom	Martin McDonagh
2019 (44th)	Cold War	Zimna wojna	Poland/ France	Paweł Pawlikowski
2019 (44th)	Our Struggles	Nos batailles	Belgium/ France	Guillaume Senez
2019 (44th)	Capernaum	کفرناحوم	Lebanon	Nadine Labaki
2019 (44th)	Hannah		Italy/ France	Andrea Pallaoro

=== 2020s ===
Year	Winner and nominees	Original title	Country	Director
2020 (45th)	Parasite	기생충	South Korea	Bong Joon-ho
2020 (45th)	Pain and Glory	Dolor y gloria	Spain	Pedro Almodóvar
2020 (45th)	Young Ahmed	Le Jeune Ahmed	Belgium	Luc Dardenne; Jean-Pierre Dardenne
2020 (45th)	Joker		United States	Todd Phillips
2020 (45th)	Lola		Belgium; France	Laurent Micheli
2020 (45th)	Once Upon a Time in Hollywood		United States	Quentin Tarantino
2020 (45th)	The Traitor	Il traditore	Italy	Marco Bellocchio
2021 (46th)	Another Round	Druk	Denmark	Thomas Vinterberg
2021 (46th)	1917		United Kingdom/ United States	Sam Mendes
2021 (46th)	Corpus Christi	Boże Ciało	Poland/ France	Jan Komasa
2021 (46th)	Dark Waters		United States	Todd Haynes
2021 (46th)	The August Virgin	La virgen de agosto	Spain	Jonás Trueba
2022 (47th)	The Father		United Kingdom	Florian Zeller
2022 (47th)	Compartment No. 6	Hytti nro 6	Finland/ Russia	Juho Kuosmanen
2022 (47th)	Drive My Car	ドライブ・マイ・カー	Japan	Ryusuke Hamaguchi
2022 (47th)	First Cow		United States	Kelly Reichardt
2022 (47th)	Just 6.5	متری شیش و نیم	Iran	Saeed Roustayi
2022 (47th)	Parallel Mothers	Madres paralelas	Spain	Pedro Almodóvar
2022 (47th)	The Worst Person in the World	Verdens verste menneske	Norway	Joachim Trier
2023 (48th)	The Beasts	As bestas	Spain / France	Rodrigo Sorogoyen
2023 (48th)	Boy from Heaven		Sweden	Tarik Saleh
2023 (48th)	Close		Belgium	Lukas Dhont
2023 (48th)	EO		Poland	Jerzy Skolimowski
2023 (48th)	Triangle of Sadness		Sweden	Ruben Östlund
2024 (49th)	The Nature of Love	Simple comme Sylvain	Canada / France	Monia Chokri
2024 (49th)	Fallen Leaves	Kuolleet lehdet	Finland / Germany	Aki Kaurismäki
2024 (49th)	Kidnapped	Rapito	Italy	Marco Bellocchio
2024 (49th)	Oppenheimer		United States / United Kingdom	Christopher Nolan
2024 (49th)	Perfect Days	パーフェクト・デイズ	Japan / Germany	Wim Wenders
2025 (50th)	The Zone of Interest		United Kingdom / Poland	Jonathan Glazer
2025 (50th)	Anora		United States	Sean Baker
2025 (50th)	The Apprentice		Canada / Denmark	Ali Abbasi
2025 (50th)	The Seed of the Sacred Fig	دانه‌ی انجیر معابد	Iran / Germany	Mohammad Rasoulof
2025 (50th)	The Substance		France / United Kingdom	Coralie Fargeat
2026 (51st)	One Battle After Another		United States	Paul Thomas Anderson
2026 (51st)	Black Dog	狗阵	China	Guan Hu
2026 (51st)	The Secret Agent	O Agente Secreto	Brazil	Kleber Mendonça Filho
2026 (51st)	Sentimental Value	Affeksjonsverdi	Norway	Joachim Trier
2026 (51st)	Sirāt		Spain	Oliver Laxe

== Awards by nation ==
Country	Number of winning films	Number of nominated films
United States	17	88
United Kingdom	8	23
Italy	6	13
Spain	3	13
Belgium	2	18
Germany (Note: Includes films of West Germany.)	2	12
Canada	2	7
Denmark	2	5
Japan	2	5
Sweden	1	6
Hong Kong	1	2
Iran	1	3
Australia	1	1
Israel	1	1
Russia	1	2
South Korea	1	2
New Zealand	1	1
Poland	1	6
Brazil	0	4
Norway	0	3
Argentina	0	2
China	0	2
Romania	0	2
Turkey	0	2
Soviet Union (Note: The Soviet Union received its two nominations for a Russian-language film and a Mongolian-language film before it was formally dissolved on December 26, 1991.)	0	2
(Socialist Federal Republic of Yugoslavia) Yugoslavia	0	2
France (Note: Films which contains non-French dialogue.)	0	2
Hungary	0	1
India	0	1
(Republic of Ireland) Ireland	0	1
Lebanon	0	1
South Africa	0	1
Taiwan	0	1
Finland	0	2

== Multiple winners ==
6 directors have won the award multiple times.

Wins	Director
3	(United States) Clint Eastwood
2	(United States) Woody Allen
2	(Spain) Pedro Almodóvar
2	(United Kingdom) Ken Loach
2	(United States) David Lynch
2	(Italy) Ettore Scola

== See also ==
- Lumière Award for Best French-Language Film
- Academy Award for Best International Feature Film
- BAFTA Award for Best Film Not in the English Language
