= 1st Magritte Awards =

2011 Belgian film awards ceremony

- Official poster
- Date: 5 February 2011
- Site: Square; Mont des Arts, Brussels, Belgium
- Hosted by: Helena Noguerra
- Produced by: José Bouquiaux
- Directed by: Vincent J. Gustin

Highlights
- Best Film: Mr. Nobody
- Most awards: Mr. Nobody (6)
- Most nominations: Illegal (8)

Television coverage
- Network: BeTV

The 1st Magritte Awards ceremony, presented by the Académie André Delvaux, honored the best films of 2010 in Belgium and took place on 5 February 2011 at the Square in the historic site of Mont des Arts, Brussels, beginning at 7:30 p.m. CET. During the ceremony, the Académie André Delvaux presented Magritte Awards in twenty categories. The ceremony, televised in Belgium by BeTV, was produced by José Bouquiaux and directed by Vincent J. Gustin. Film director Jaco Van Dormael presided the ceremony, while actress Helena Noguerra hosted the evening. The pre-show ceremony was hosted by film director Fabrice Du Welz.

Mr. Nobody won six awards, including Best Film and Best Director for Jaco Van Dormael. Other winners included Illegal, Private Lessons, and A Town Called Panic with two awards each, and The Barons, The Boat Race, Looking for Eric, Paths of Memory, Sleepless Night, and Soeur Sourire with one.

== Background ==
In 2010, the Académie André Delvaux was established by Patrick Quinet, president of the Francophone Film Producers Association (UPFF), and Luc Jabon, president of Pro Spère, to unite the five branches of the film industry: actors, directors, producers, technicians and writers. It aims to recognize excellence in Belgian francophone cinematic achievements in order to have a Belgian counterpart of the French César Awards. Charly Herscovici, who created the Magritte Foundation, allowed the academy to use the name of the Belgian artist René Magritte.

Overseen by the Académie André Delvaux, the Magritte Awards replace the Joseph Plateau Awards, which were disestablished in 2007. During the first ceremony, 18 merit categories and two special awards were presented, honoring artists, directors and other personalities of the film industry for their works during the 2009–2010 period.

== Winners and nominees ==
The nominees for the 1st Magritte Awards were announced on 13 January 2011 at the Square in Mont des Arts, Brussels, by Patrick Quinet and Luc Jabon, co-presidents of the Académie André Delvaux. Illegal received the most nominations with eight total, followed by Mr. Nobody and Private Lessons with seven each. The nominees for the Magritte Awards for Best Short Film and Best Documentary Film were announced on 29 December 2010.

The winners were announced during the awards ceremony on 5 February 2011. Mr. Nobody won six awards, the most for the ceremony: Best Film, Best Director and Best Screenplay for Jaco Van Dormael, Best Cinematography for Christophe Beaucarne, Best Original Score for Pierre Van Dormael, and Best Editing for Matyas Veress. Illegal and Private Lessons received two acting awards apiece. A Town Called Panic received two technical awards. On 25 January 2011 the Honorary Magritte Award was bestowed posthumously to André Delvaux.

=== Awards ===
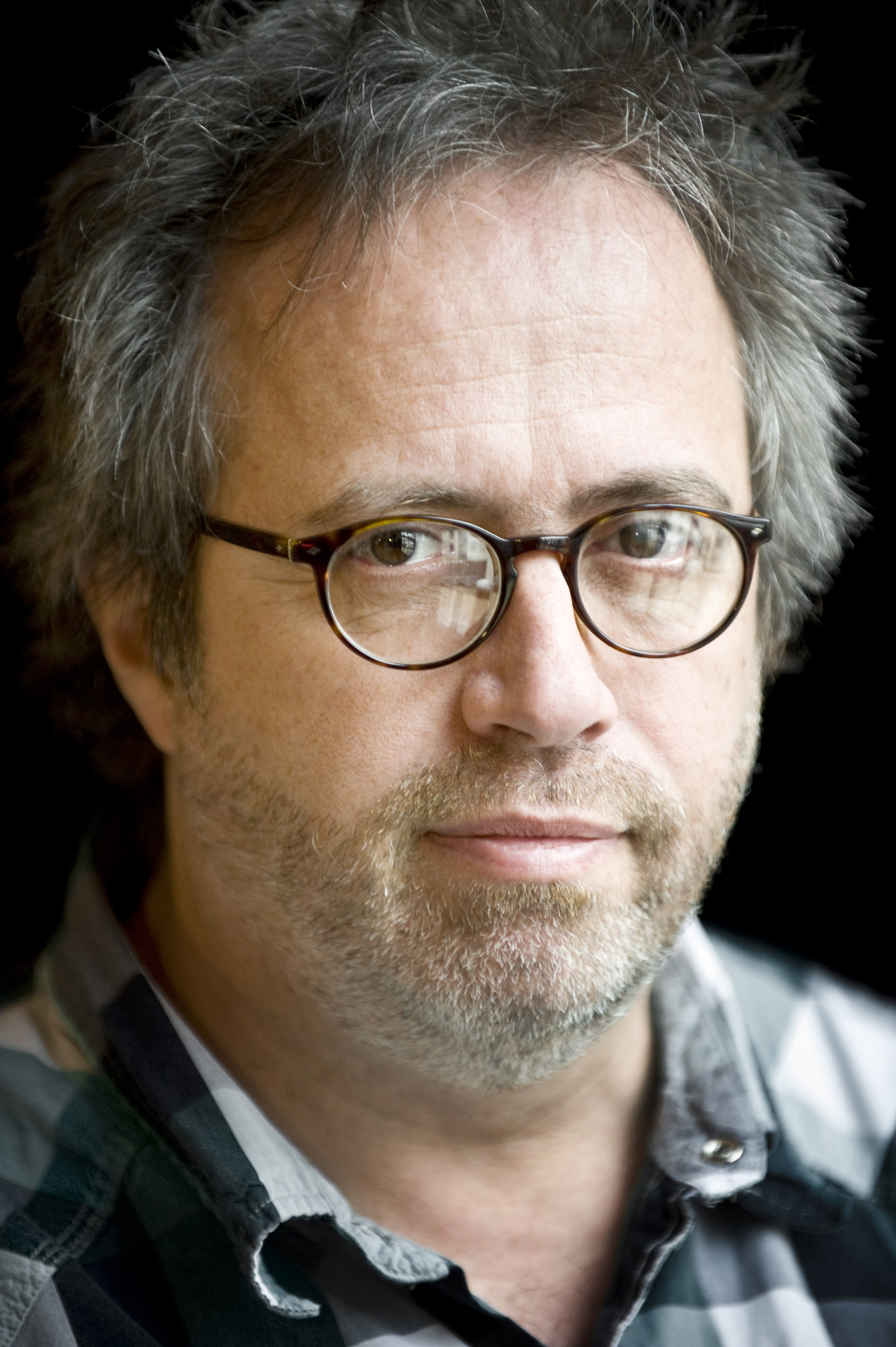
Jaco Van Dormael, Best Director and Best Screenplay winner

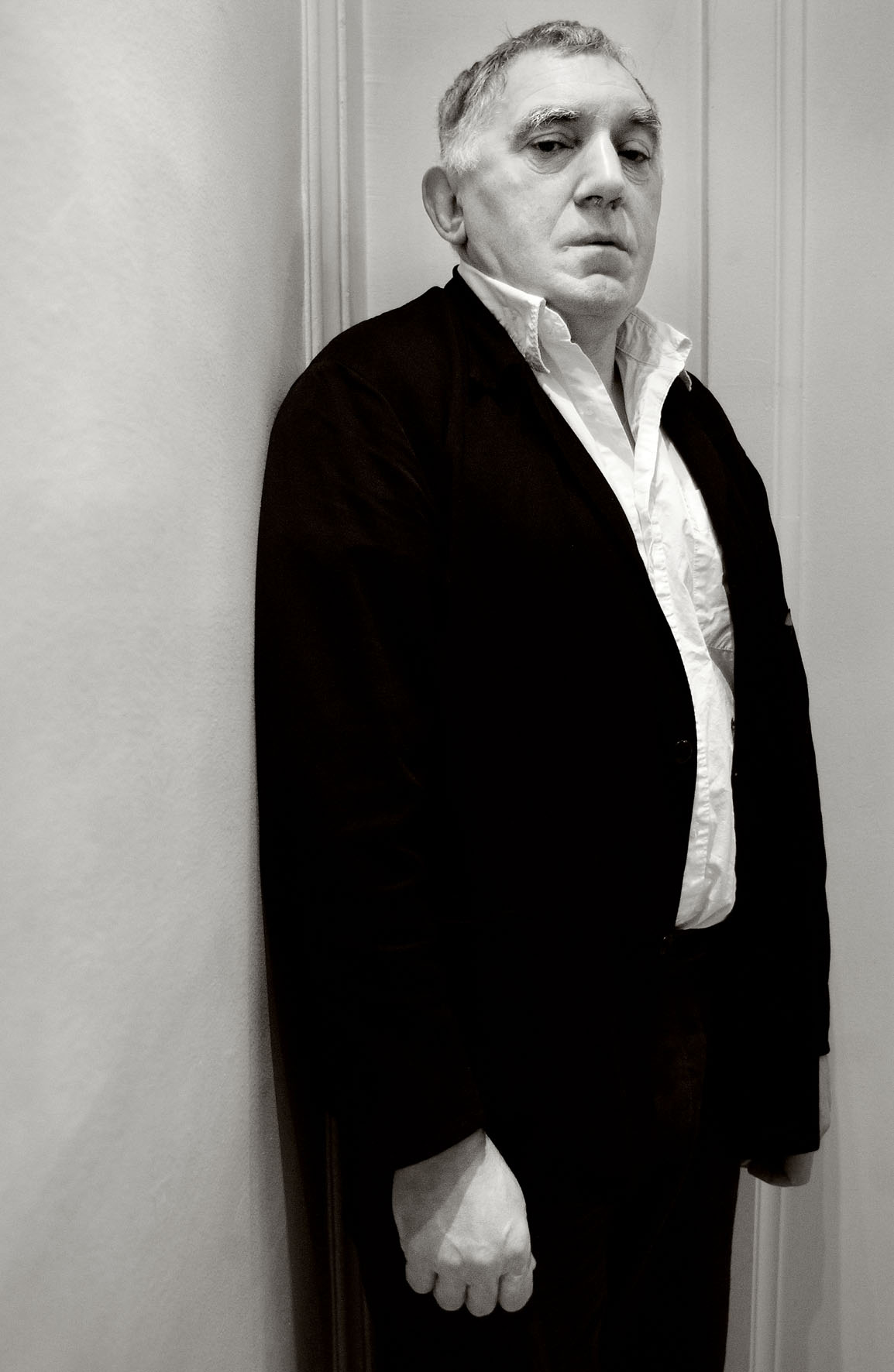
Jan Decleir, Best Supporting Actor winner

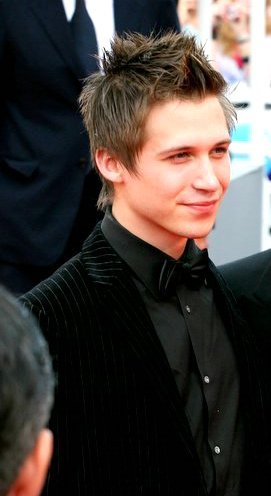
Joffrey Verbruggen, Most Promising Actor winner

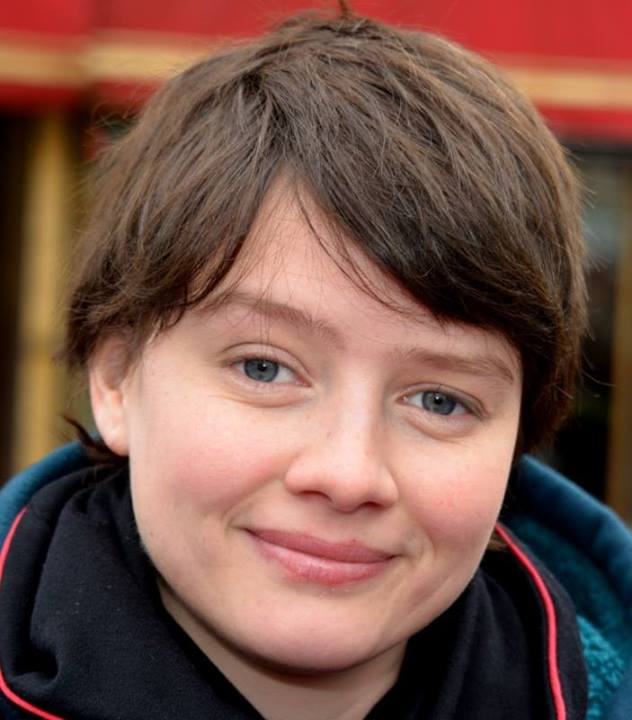
Pauline Étienne, Most Promising Actress winner

Winners are listed first and highlighted in boldface.

Best Film	Best Director
**Mr. Nobody – produced by Olivier Rausin; directed by Jaco Van Dormael**; Amer – produced by Eve Commenge; directed by Hélène Cattet and Bruno Forzani; The Barons – produced by Sébastien Delloye and Diana Elbaum; directed by Nabil Ben Yadir; Illegal – produced by Jacques-Henri Bronckart and Olivier Bronckart; directed by Olivier Masset-Depasse	**Jaco Van Dormael – Mr. Nobody**; Nabil Ben Yadir – The Barons; Joachim Lafosse – Private Lessons; Olivier Masset-Depasse – Illegal
Best Actor	Best Actress
**Jonathan Zaccaï – Private Lessons** as Pierre; Mounir Ait Hamou – The Barons as Aziz; Olivier Gourmet – Angel at Sea as Bruno; Thierry Hancisse – The Boat Race as Thierry	**Anne Coesens – Illegal** as Tania; Cécile de France – Soeur Sourire as Jeanine Deckers; Yolande Moreau – Mammuth as Catherine Pilardosse; Aylin Yay – Motherly as Viviane
Best Supporting Actor	Best Supporting Actress
**Jan Decleir – The Barons** as Lucien; Laurent Capelluto – OSS 117: Lost in Rio as Kutner; François Damiens – Heartbreaker as Marc; Benoît Poelvoorde – Coco Before Chanel as Étienne Balsan; Yannick Renier – Private Lessons as Didier	**Christelle Cornil – Illegal** as Lieve; Sandrine Blancke – Soeur Sourire as Annie Pécher; Claire Bodson – Private Lessons as Nathalie; Yolande Moreau – Gainsbourg: A Heroic Life as Fréhel
Most Promising Actor	Most Promising Actress
**Joffrey Verbruggen – The Boat Race** as Alexandre; Amir Ben Abdelmoumen – Oscar and the Lady in Pink as Oscar; Jonas Bloquet – Private Lessons as Jonas; Martin Nissen – Angel at Sea as Louis	**Pauline Étienne – Private Lessons** as Delphine; Stéphanie Blanchoud – The Boat Race as Læticia; Anna Fransiska Jager – My Queen Karo as Karo; Chloé Struvay – Motherly as Zoé
Best Screenplay	Best Film in Coproduction
**Mr. Nobody – Jaco Van Dormael**; The Barons – Nabil Ben Yadir and Laurent Brandenbourger with Sébastien Fernandez; Illegal – Olivier Masset-Depasse; Private Lessons – Joachim Lafosse and François Pirot	**Looking for Eric – coproduced by Jean-Pierre and Luc Dardenne; directed by Ken Loach**; Altiplano – coproduced by Diana Elbaum and Sébastien Delloye; directed by Peter Brosens and Jessica Woodworth; Le Concert – coproduced by André Logie; directed by Radu Mihăileanu; My Queen Karo – coproduced by Joseph Rouschop; directed by Dorothée Van Den Berghe
Best Cinematography	Best Editing
**Mr. Nobody – Christophe Beaucarne**; Amer – Manuel Dacosse; The Boat Race – Alain Marcoen	**Mr. Nobody – Matyas Veress**; Le Concert – Ludo Troch; Illegal – Damien Keyeux
Best Original Score	Best Sound
**Mr. Nobody – Pierre Van Dormael**; Diamant 13 – Frédéric Vercheval; A Town Called Panic – Bernard Plouvier	**A Town Called Panic – Benoît Biral, Valene Leroy, Julien Paschal, and Fred Pie**; Illegal – Marc Bastien, François Dumont, and Thomas Gauder; Mr. Nobody – Emmanuel de Boissieu, Frédéric Demolder, and Dominique Warniert
Best Production Design	Best Costume Design
**A Town Called Panic – Eric Blesin and Marc Nis**; The Barons – Mohammed Ayada; Illegal – Patrick Dechesne and Alain-Pascal Housiaux	**Soeur Sourire – Christophe Pidre and Florence Scholtes**; Altiplano – Anne Fournier; My Queen Karo – Bernadette Corstens
Best Documentary Film	Best Short Film
**Paths of Memory – directed by José Luis Peñafuerte; produced by Marion Hänsel**; Dreaming Film – directed and produced by Eric Pauwels; Katanga Business – directed by Thierry Michel; produced by Christine Pireaux; The Land of Utility – directed and produced by Sophie Bruneau and Marc-Antoine Roudil; Winds of Sand, Women of Rock – produced by Sébastien Delloye and Diana Elbaum; directed by Nathalie Borgers	**Sleepless Night – directed by Samuel Tilman; produced by Marie Besson**; For You I Will Fight – directed by Rachel Lang; So Close – directed by Rémi Durin; produced by Arnaud Demuynck; The Swing – directed by Christophe Hermans; produced by Marie Besson; Under Blue Skies – directed by Arnaud Demuynck and Cécilia Marreiros Marum; produced by Arnaud Demuynck

==== Honorary Magritte Award ====
- **André Delvaux**

==== Audience Award ====
- **Benoît Poelvoorde**

== Films with multiple nominations and awards ==
The following 13 films received multiple nominations.

- Eight: Illegal
- Seven: Mr. Nobody and Private Lessons
- Six: The Barons
- Four: The Boat Race
- Three: My Queen Karo, Sister Smile, and A Town Called Panic
- Two: Altiplano, Amer, Angel at Sea, Le Concert, and Motherly

The following four films received multiple awards.

- Six: Mr. Nobody
- Two: Illegal, Private Lessons, and A Town Called Panic

== See also ==
- 36th César Awards
- 16th Lumières Awards
- 2010 in film
