= Angoulême Francophone Film Festival =

Annual festival in France

The Angoulême Francophone Film Festival (French: Festival du film francophone d'Angoulême, FFA) is an annual film festival held in Angoulême, France. It was founded by Dominique Besnehard in 2008 and has been held every year in December. It was launched as a showcase for all kind of francophone works. The festival includes a retrospective of films that were released during the year as well as a series of premieres and other special screenings.

Since its foundation, it has played host to Ursula Meier, Philippe Falardeau, Stéphane Aubier and Vincent Patar, Olivier Masset-Depasse, Michel Leclerc, Valérie Donzelli, Philippe Van Leeuw, Guillaume Gallienne, Faouzi Bensaïdi, Nabil Ayouch, Mohamed Ben Attia, among others.

== See also ==
- Festival International du Film Francophone de Namur
