= A Town Called Panic =

Belgian animated sitcom (2002–2003)

- French: Panique au village
- Genre: Children's; Animated sitcom; Slapstick; Surreal comedy
- Created by: Stéphane Aubier; Vincent Patar
- Voices of: French/Belgian version: Bruce Ellison; Stéphane Aubier; Vincent Patar; Didier Odieu; Benoît Poelvoorde; English version: Alexander Armstrong; David Holt; Alan Marriott; Lucy Montgomery; John Sparkes
- Composer: Be Plouvier
- Country of origin: Belgium
- Original language: French
- No. of series: 1
- No. of episodes: 20

Production
- Running time: 5 minutes
- Production companies: La Parti; Pic Pic André

Original release
- Network: Canal+ Belgique
- Release: 23 December 2002 – 11 January 2003

A Town Called Panic (French: Panique au village, lit. 'Panic at the Village') is a French-language Belgian stop-motion animated sitcom created by Stéphane Aubier and Vincent Patar for La Parti and Pic Pic André. It follows the everyday events of the characters Cowboy, Indian and Horse who live together in a small rural town as they go about their lives. The animation is designed to appear crude, as if done by a child (the characters evoke the look of cheap toy figurines) and the events of the characters' daily lives are extremely surreal and slapstick.

The first A Town Called Panic was a four-minute short film premiered in 1991. Its concept was developed into a television series, which was first broadcast from 2002 to 2003 and consists of 20 episodes each of roughly five minutes long (though some stations have broadcast them in 15- or 30-minute blocks). An English-language dub of the television series episodes was created and sold internationally by Aardman Animations.

A spin-off feature film, again titled A Town Called Panic, was completed in spring 2009 and debuted at the Cannes Film Festival in May of the same year. In 2013, the half-hour Christmas special "The Christmas Log" was made, which received an English dub that aired on CBBC in 2014 under the title "A Christmas Panic". The English dub for this special used different voice actors than the dub for the original series. In 2016 a new 3-minute short "The Noise of Grey" and later a half-hour special "Back to School!" were premiered, and a package film of "The Christmas Log" and "Back to School!" was released to cinemas worldwide under the name A Town Called Panic: Double Fun. A short called "The County Fair" was released in 2019 and a short called "The Summer Holidays" was released in 2021.

A Town Called Panic has been broadcast worldwide on channels such as ABC Rollercoaster in Australia, Nicktoons Network in the United States, EBS in South Korea, and Teletoon in Canada, and it was available for online viewing on Atom.com.

In the United Kingdom, A Town Called Panic aired on Nickelodeon. Much of the characters and scenery were later recycled for a series of adverts for Cravendale Milk that aired from 2007 to 2010, using a pirate, a cow and a bicyclist as the characters.

== Characters ==
This is the list of major characters in the original 20-episode run, with short descriptions.

Cowboy (Coboy)

Voiced By: Stéphane Aubier (French) / David Holt (English)

Cowboy is a toy figurine of a cowboy in a blue shirt and brown leather trousers, with a hat and, most of the time, a rifle. Cowboy is rather cowardly and not really bright, often getting himself into bad situations through his reckless behaviour. He has something of a sibling rivalry with Indian (though they most likely are not really related), and is intimidated by Horse.

Indian (Indien)

Voiced By: Bruce Ellison (French) / Alan Marriott (English)

Indian is a toy figurine of a stereotypical Native American tribal chief or elder, in a yellow shirt and brown leather trousers, with an elaborate and large feather headdress. He carries a ceremonial staff. Besides the usual standing position he is often seen in a Native American-style meditative pose. Other times, he carries a bow and arrow. Indian is a little more mature than Cowboy, but still pursues foolhardy quests almost as much as his counterpart. He is also somewhat fearful of Horse. In the Christmas Special's English dub, his name is changed to Chief.

Horse (Cheval)

Voiced By: Vincent Patar (French) / Alexander Armstrong (English)

Horse is a toy figurine of a brown horse. Although an animal, Horse is easily as intelligent as Cowboy and Indian (put together) and is the leader of the "family" he, Cowboy and Indian are part of. Even though he walks on all fours, he does most of the chores around their house, as both his charges are domestically useless. He maintains a cool head, doesn't engage in the foolish pursuits of Cowboy and Indian and keeps a semblance of normality in the house. When Cowboy and/or Indian infuriate him, he kicks them (presumably with his hind legs) all over the house and usually into one of the walls, which is sufficient to keep the two in line most of the time. In the film, his birthday is 21 June.

Steven

Voiced By: Benoît Poelvoorde (French) / John Sparkes (English)

A farmer who owns the only other house in the village. He constantly yells, even when not angry, and is very possessive of his tractor.

Jeanine

Voiced By: Lucy Montgomery (English)

Steven's loving wife.

Bernadette

Steven and Jeanine's daughter.

Policeman (Gendarme)

Voiced By: David Holt (English)

Lives in a guard shack by the side of the road that passes through the village.

Farm animals (Animaux)

Various Voices

The animals on Steven's farm.

The bear (L'ours)

Voiced By: Didier Odieu (French)

A figurine of a black bear standing on its hind legs that chases many of the characters quite frequently, usually after having been disturbed by them from his sleep. It is never made clear if it is the same bear or a different one every time, though they all look the same.

Robin Hood

Voiced By: David Holt (English)

A hunter obviously parodied from the original Robin Hood stories. He is a peckish and sometimes extremely careless hunter who lives in a caravan in the woods. He can be recognised by his long blond hair, his green hunting clothes and his posh English accent, and he carries an archery kit around with him.

Simon

Simon is a red-haired citizen in a green shirt, blue denim jeans and black boots, who lives alone in a strangely small shed that gets knocked down by Steven's red tractor in the episode "Cowboy goes Hunting". Simon is a fairly friendly man who is on neutral terms with Cowboy, Indian and Horse, never causing conflict with them. Simon is often shown doing odd jobs for Cowboy and Indian, including managing the sound effects with Horse and Chicken in the episode "The Play". In the same episode, Simon lights a fire next to the microphone to give the illusion that Cowboy is about to get burnt alive in the play, but the fire gets out of control and out of stress, Simon faints and everyone has to evacuate the building (Jenanine and Steven's barn). Later on, the barn completely burns down.

== Episodes ==
As of 24 November 2011, 20 episodes of A Town Called Panic had been made.

1. "Cake" ("Le gâteau") - Horse bakes a delicious cake, so Cowboy and Indian plan a midnight feast which is scuppered by the arrival of an angry bear.
2. "Cow Hulk" ("Cob'Hulk") - After Cowboy accidentally swallows a pebble, things go out of hand when he suddenly turns into a caveman, gorilla, and a dinosaur.
3. "The Easy Chair" ("Le Relax") - Cowboy cannot resist messing around with Horse's new lounger, which can change itself into a sun-bed, waffle-maker or Jacuzzi.
4. "Still Life" ("Un séance de pose") - Indian decides to take up painting, but the flower he chooses as his first subject is stolen first by Jeanine, then by Steven, then by the Cow.
5. "Lisa and Jan" ("Lise et Jan") - Two backpackers arrive in town, but Constable's attempts to find them somewhere to pitch their tent leads to a series of disasters.
6. "Robin" - Robin's appalling archery skills result in Jeanine's kitchen catching fire. But when Bernadette gets the blame, her friends plot revenge.
7. "Fox Hunt" ("La chasse au renard") - Cowboy and Indian are on the trail of the same fox, but when Cowboy incurs the wrath of a ferocious bison, trouble soon escalates.
8. "A Grand Day Out" ("La belle excursion") - Joseph takes Steven and his family on a day trip to see a farm run entirely by animals. But the place is not all that it seems.
9. "Indian Treasure" ("Le trésor d'Indien") - Horse and Indian send Cowboy off on a wild goose chase. But what lies at the end of their mysterious trail?
10. "The Cycle Race" ("La course cycliste") - Cowboy and Indian are determined to win the Cycling Cup, and they don't care what underhand means they use to achieve this.
11. "Constable's Fantastic Voyage" ("Le voyage de Gendarme") - A mysterious time machine takes Constable back to medieval times. But has the town really changed?
12. "Donkey Gets Kidnapped" ("On a kidnappé Âne") - Cowboy and Indian lure Steven's animals into a glitzy disco, and take Donkey hostage in exchange for Steven's tractor.
13. "The Big Sleep" ("Le grand sommeil") - A series of bizarre accidents sends Cowboy, Indian and Horse to sleep for centuries, and they awake to find a strange new world.
14. "Cowboy and Indian Go Camping" ("Coboy et Indien au camping") - Cowboy attempts to build a campfire while Indian goes off hunting, a surefire recipe for disaster.
15. "The Picnic" ("Déjeuner sur l'herbe") - Horse digs up a bus containing the 1986 Mexican World Cup squad, who challenge our heroes to a bizarre soccer match.
16. "The Card Thieves" ("Les voleurs de cartes") - Steven's pack of cards is stolen, and the trail leads to the duckpond, and eventually to the underwater world of Atlantis.
17. "Cowboy Goes Hunting" ("Coboy chasseur") - Cowboy's attempts to catch a wild boar cause chaos when they end up concussing Steven at the wheel of his tractor.
18. "Horse's Nephew" ("Laurent le neveu de Cheval") - When Horse's mischievous nephew, Lawrence, comes to stay, Cowboy and Indian get blamed for a series of naughty pranks.
19. "Jeanine and Steven's Vacation" ("Janine et Steven en vacances") - Steven leaves Cowboy and Indian in charge of the farm, but the animals have plans for a vacation of their own.
20. "The Play" ("La pièce de théâtre") - The townsfolk put on a play in Steven's barn. Simon is charge of the special effects, causing disastrous results.

== Availability ==
In the United States and Canada, the original 20 television episodes, the 2014 special "The Christmas Log", the 2016 short "The Noise of Grey" and the 2016 special "Back to School!" were released together on Blu-ray Disc (no DVD version has been released) under the title A Town Called Panic: The Collection by GKIDS on 19 December 2017. They have also released the series and specials (but not "The Noise of Grey") on video on demand services.
