= 16th Lumière Awards =

2011 French film awards ceremony

- Date: 14 January 2011
- Site: Hôtel de Ville, Paris, France

Highlights
- Best Film: Of Gods and Men
- Best Director: Roman Polanski
- Best Actor: Michael Lonsdale
- Best Actress: Kristin Scott Thomas

The 16th Lumière Awards ceremony, presented by the Académie des Lumières, was held on 14 January 2011. The ceremony was presided by François Berléand. Of Gods and Men won the award for Best Film.

== Winners and nominees ==
Winners are listed first and highlighted in bold.

Best Film	Best Director
**Of Gods and Men**: The Illusionist; The Ghost Writer; Gainsbourg: A Heroic Life; Carlos	**Roman Polanski — The Ghost Writer**: Xavier Beauvois — Of Gods and Men; Olivier Assayas — Carlos; Mathieu Amalric — On Tour; Joann Sfar — Gainsbourg: A Heroic Life
Best Actor	Best Actress
**Michael Lonsdale — Of Gods and Men**: Lambert Wilson — Of Gods and Men & The Princess of Montpensier; Romain Duris — The Big Picture & Heartbreaker; Éric Elmosnino — Gainsbourg: A Heroic Life; Édgar Ramírez — Carlos	**Kristin Scott Thomas — Sarah's Key**: Catherine Deneuve — Potiche; Juliette Binoche — Certified Copy; Isabelle Carré — Romantics Anonymous; Ludivine Sagnier — Lily Sometimes
Most Promising Actor	Most Promising Actress
**Antonin Chalon** — **No et moi**: Aymen Saïdi — Top Floor, Left Wing; Nahuel Perez Biscayart — Deep in the Woods; Emile Berling — The Clink of Ice; Jules Pelissier — Lights Out	**Yahima Torres** — **Black Venus**: Lolita Chammah — Copacabana; Marie Féret — Mozart's Sister; Nina Rodriguez — No et moi; Linda Doudaeva — Hands Up
Best Screenplay	Best French-Language Film
**The Ghost Writer** — **Robert Harris** and **Roman Polanski**: Outside the Law — Rachid Bouchareb and Olivier Lorelle; Tout ce qui brille — Hervé Mimran and Géraldine Nakache; The Tree — Julie Bertuccelli; The Names of Love — Baya Kasmi and Michel Leclerc	**A Screaming Man**: Orly; Amer; Illegal; Private Lessons; Heartbeats
Best Cinematography	World Audience Award (presented by TV5Monde)
**Caroline Champetier** — **Of Gods and Men**	**Illegal** — **Olivier Masset-Depasse**
Honorary Lumière Award
**Roman Polanski**

== See also ==
- 36th César Awards
- 1st Magritte Awards
