= Ernest & Celestine =

2012 film

- French theatrical release poster
- Directed by: Stéphane Aubier; Vincent Patar; Benjamin Renner
- Written by: Daniel Pennac
- Based on: Ernest & Celestine by Gabrielle Vincent
- Produced by: Didier Brunner; Henri Magalon; Vincent Tavier
- Starring: Lambert Wilson; Pauline Brunner
- Cinematography: Stéphane Aubier; Vincent Patar
- Edited by: Fabienne Alvarez-Giro
- Music by: Vincent Courtois
- Production companies: La Parti Productions; Les Armateurs; Melusine Productions
- Distributed by: StudioCanal (France); Cinéart (Belgium)
- Release dates: 23 May 2012 (Cannes); 12 December 2012 (France); 19 December 2012 (Belgium)
- Running time: 80 minutes
- Countries: Belgium; France; Luxembourg
- Language: French
- Budget: €8.9 million
- Box office: $8.1 million

Ernest & Celestine (French: Ernest et Célestine) is a 2012 animated comedy-drama film directed by Stéphane Aubier, Vincent Patar and Benjamin Renner. The film is based on a series of children's books of the same name by the Belgian author and illustrator Gabrielle Vincent that were first published in the early 1980s. The film was selected to be screened in the Directors' Fortnight section at the 2012 Cannes Film Festival, as part of the TIFF Kids programme at the 2012 Toronto International Film Festival and at the 2013 Hong Kong International Film Festival.

It was selected for the grand competition at feature film edition of the 2013 World festival of animated film Animafest Zagreb and was screened as the opening film. The film was released in the United States in 2013 by GKIDS. An English dub was released on 28 February 2014, with the voices of Forest Whitaker, Mackenzie Foy, Lauren Bacall, Paul Giamatti, William H. Macy, Megan Mullally, Nick Offerman and Jeffrey Wright. The film received widespread acclaim, and became the first animated film to win the Magritte Award for Best Film. It was nominated for Best Animated Feature at the 86th Academy Awards, but it lost to Walt Disney Animation Studios' animated musical Frozen.

A sequel, entitled Ernest & Celestine: A Trip to Gibberitia, was released in France on 14 December 2022.

== Plot ==
Celestine is a young mouse who lives in the underground world of rodents. At the orphanage where she lives, the caretaker known as the Gray One tells scary stories about the evil nature of the bears that live in the outside world, though Celestine doubts that they are entirely true. She loves to draw but must soon study dentistry, since that's what all rodents do, and to prepare, she must travel above ground to collect the lost teeth of a cub from underneath pillows. On one such occasion, the bear family catches Celestine in the act and chases her into a trash can where she is trapped and spends the night. The next morning, a destitute and starving grizzly bear named Ernest discovers Celestine and attempts to eat her. Celestine convinces him to let her go by helping him break into the basement of a candy shop, where he can eat his fill. He is soon caught by the store's owner, however, and arrested. Celestine, who is behind on her quota of collected teeth, agrees to free him from the police wagon if he will help her break into and rob the teeth from the office of the store owner's wife, who happens to be a dentist.

Although the robbery initially seems successful, the pair are soon pursued by the police forces of both the rodent and bear cities. They manage to evade capture by stealing a van, and escape to Ernest's remote cabin. Ernest is initially reluctant to allow Celestine to stay with him, but they begin to bond after he discovers her love of art. He reveals to her that his current destitution is a result of his rejection of his family's plan for him to go into law, like his ancestors, due to his desire to become an entertainer. The two spend the winter happily together, though their joy is somewhat dampened by the constant radio broadcasts declaring that both police forces are still searching for them.

In the spring, the police are able to track the stolen van to the cabin. Ernest is arrested by the rodents, while Celestine is arrested by the bears. Both are simultaneously put on trial, in the main floor and basement of the same courthouse. Though each of them protest their unfair treatment along with the government's bias and prejudice, as well as refusing to sell out their respective companion, the furious judges refuse to listen. Ernest and Celestine then call the judges and the rest of the higher class out on their cruelty to the lower class common folk. During the proceedings, a fire is accidentally started in the courthouse, and while the rest of the citizens flee despite the furious judges' demands to stay, Ernest and Celestine each stay behind to rescue their respective judges. The judges are both humiliated and broken that their people, the ones they thought they could always rule, have abandoned them to save their own lives while the ones they sought to wrongfully punish are their saviors. Having truly admitted defeat in their own hearts, the shameful judges drop the charges against Ernest and Celestine; they have no other choice than to grant their wish to remain living together. All the while, the judges express their inability to comprehend the concept of unconditional bonds; and can only watch along with the shaken populaces as the courthouses burn to the ground.

Reunited in Ernest's cabin, the pair decide to write and illustrate a book telling the story of their friendship, though with some embellishments after Celestine protests including the part of their meeting where Ernest attempted to eat her.

== Cast ==
Character	French voice actor	English dubbing actor
Ernest	Lambert Wilson	Forest Whitaker
Celestine	Pauline Brunner	Mackenzie Foy
The Grey One	Anne-Marie Loop	Lauren Bacall
The Rat Judge	Pierre Baton	Paul Giamatti
The Dentist	Dominique Collignon-Maurin	William H. Macy
Lucienne	Brigitte Virtudes	Megan Mullally
Georges	Patrice Melennec	Nick Offerman
The Bear Judge	Féodor Atkine	Jeffrey Wright
Chief Police of Bears	Vincent Grass	David Boat
Antionette		Ashley Earnest

== Production ==
The project was launched by producer Didier Brunner in late 2007, and an animated pilot was completed after a year. The search for funding for the film lasted until April 2009. From mid-2009 to mid-2010, the bulk of the work focused on developing the storyboards. The actual production phase, consisting of creating the animation, then lasted a year and a half, followed by a shorter post-production phase.

=== Start of the project and choice of directors ===
The film project originated as an initiative by producer Didier Brunner: Having been familiar with the illustrated children's book series Ernest and Celestine for a long time, he seized the opportunity to acquire the audiovisual adaptation rights of the series when Gabrielle Vincent's nephew considered giving them up for an animated series; however, Brunner opted for a feature film instead. In December 2007, Brunner contacted Benjamin Renner to work on an animated pilot defining the main orientations of the feature film project; Renner was then the art director. The realization of this animated pilot took about a year.

After its completion, the first director initially considered by Didier Brunner stepped down, and Brunner then proposed that Benjamin Renner direct the film. Having never directed a feature film before, Renner requested to be teamed with more experienced co-directors, Belgians Vincent Patar and Stéphane Aubier, directors of the animated series A Town Called Panic (made in stop-motion animation using figurines). The film was thus co-directed by three directors: Benjamin Renner, Vincent Patar, and Stéphane Aubier. The film's actual production (after the pilot) began in 2009. The three directors divided tasks: All three worked together on the script, storyboards, and breakdown, Renner was responsible for the film's art direction, while Vincent Patar and Stéphane Aubier were involved again during post-production, for voices, sound effects, and sound mixing.

=== Screenplay ===
The screenplay was written by writer and screenwriter Daniel Pennac, then revised by the directors according to the constraints of animation. The film's team made an extra effort to stay true to the universe of the original books, since Gabrielle Vincent had refused all adaptation proposals during her lifetime, due to the very smooth and impersonal style of a proposed adaptation by a British studio.

The team ultimately chose to create an homage rather than a literal adaptation of the book universe: Renner integrated Daniel Pennac's universe into the story, and the final narrative took the form of more of an entryway into the universe of the books rather than a direct transposition, which resulted in a somewhat darker atmosphere for the film's screenplay. Benjamin Renner emphasized the creativity of the characters present in the initial screenplay proposed by Pennac and used it to reinforce the visual and narrative coherence of the film.

=== Art direction ===
The art direction of the film aimed to be as faithful as possible to those of the original books, particularly to the economy of lines in Gabrielle Vincent's illustrations and the sense of spontaneity they exhibit.

The character designs are partly based on the books and partly on inventiveness in the spirit of the books' universe. In the project's early stages, the character designs of Ernest and Celestine closely resembled the original book illustrations. It was through preliminary sketches that Benjamin Renner realized he had inadvertently modified the features of the two characters, even though Vincent herself had evolved from one book to another in her way of drawing them. Celestine's design underwent the most visible changes: her nose is shorter and her forehead more pronounced than in the books, which slightly humanizes her features and makes her various expressions easier for animators to work on · . The harmonization of this adaptation of the character designs was ensured by animator Seï Riondet. The outfits worn by Ernest and Celestine are all inspired by those they wear in the books. Seï also designed the numerous principal characters present in Pennac's script, but without equivalents in Gabrielle Vincent's books, totaling around 174 characters.

The backgrounds in the film created by Zaza and Zyk are inspired by nature drawings by Gabrielle Vincent, whether they were from the Ernest and Celestine books or not. The court scenes were inspired by a book by Vincent, Je voudrais qu'on m'écoute, which is not part of the Ernest and Celestine series and tells a story of running away. The underground city of rodents and the outfits of the gendarmes were influenced by Paul Grimault's film The King and the Mockingbird. For the scenes depicting the crowd of police mice, which worried the producer due to the cost of their animation, Benjamin Renner came up with the idea of a collective character, a sort of mass that deforms as it moves, inspired by the movements of creatures from Princess Mononoke and Spirited Away, both directed by Hayao Miyazaki.

=== Music ===
The original score was composed by Vincent Courtois. It also includes two songs written by Thomas Fersen: one performed by him, and the other by Lambert Wilson.

Among the musicians who participated in the film's soundtrack are Louis Sclavis, Dominique Pifarély, Michel Godard, François Couturier, and Vincent Courtois himself.

=== Animation ===
The first test animations, at the very beginning of production, were created by Benjamin Renner, who sent them to the producer. Renner created these animations using Adobe Flash.

Production on the film lasted for four years.

== Reception ==
=== Box office ===
In France, the film, distributed by Studio Canal, was released on 12 December 2012, simultaneously with the fantasy film The Hobbit: An Unexpected Journey, directed by Peter Jackson, the American drama Beasts of the Southern Wild, directed by Benh Zeitlin, the American thriller Arbitrage, directed by Nicholas Jarecki, and two French comedies, Mes héros, directed by Éric Besnard and Télé Gaucho, directed by Michel Leclerc. Ernest and Celestine, distributed on 489 copies, accumulated 170,049 admissions in its first week · . In Paris, where the film is distributed on 20 copies, it attracted 1,679 spectators on its opening day, achieving the second-best Parisian debut after The Hobbit: An Unexpected Journey (4,370 admissions on 28 copies). In its second week, the film recorded 153,959 admissions, then accumulated 208,641 more in its third week, thus surpassing 500,000 admissions with 532,649 admissions. With 148,590 admissions in its fourth week, the film totaled 681,239 admissions after one month of release. It gathered 47,670 spectators in its fifth week, followed by 27,035 others in its sixth week, totaling around 756,000 admissions after six weeks.

In Belgium, where the film is distributed by Cinéart, Ernest and Celestine was released on 19 December 2012 and was shown in 36 theaters.

=== Critical reception ===
The film had its world premiere at the Directors' Fortnight, out of competition, at the Cannes Film Festival 2012. It received an excellent reception from French critics. In Le Monde, Isabelle Régnier saw it as ''a delight from start to finish'', appreciating the drawings and the screenplay that respects the original series while inventing an original plot and developing its own reflection, ''something a bit more biting, a bit more political''. In Libération, Éric Loret appreciated the work on the watercolors and soundscapes and was sensitive to the social relevance of Pennac's screenplay, which ''stuffed Gabrielle Vincent's plush universe with political unease''. In Le Journal du dimanche, Stéphanie Belpêche regarded the film as ''a gem of French animation cinema'' with a story that is ''intelligent and terribly endearing''. In the free newspaper Métro, Jennifer Lesueur appreciated the message of help and love conveyed by the film and the quality of the drawings: "the film gives the impression of flipping through an original watercolor album, where every gesture, every glance is measured".

The critical reception was also favorable elsewhere in the world. The film review aggregator Rotten Tomatoes reports a 98% approval rating, based on 81 reviews with an average score of 8.20/10; the general consensus states: "Sweet and visually charming, Ernest & Celestine offers old-fashioned delights for animation lovers of all ages." Metacritic assigns a score of 86 based on 22 critics, indicating "universal acclaim". Andrew Chan of the Film Critics Circle of Australia writes, "The result is a human story of two unlikely allies, a mouse living in harmony and befriending a bear. It is essentially that simple and it works just fine." Writing on Roger Ebert's website, Glenn Kenny of MSN awarded the film 3½ stars out of 4, praising it for its positive messages of friendship. Kenny wrote: "Ernest and Celestine is the coziest movie you'll likely see all year. Every frame is suffused with a fireplace kind of warmth that, for me at least, cast an immediate spell that didn't let up." The Belgian critic from RTBF appreciated the drawings, the music, and the story "endearing and funny while prompting reflection on discrimination". In Variety, Leslie Felperin considered Ernest and Celestine a "charming animated feature" and appreciated the film's overall fidelity to the book universe as well as the nuances brought to the story and humor; she found the work of the main voice actors "adorable" but questioned the foreign dubbings of the film.

== Accolades ==
In June 2013, the film won the Award of the Hungarian National Student Jury at the 8th Festival of European Animated Feature Films and TV Specials.

Awards
Award	Category	Recipients and nominees	Result
Academy Awards	Best Animated Feature	Benjamin Renner, Didier Brunner	Nominated
Amsterdam Cinekid Festival	Best Picture		Won
Annie Awards	Best Animated Feature		Nominated
Annie Awards	Character Animation in an Animated Feature Production	Patrick Imbert	Nominated
Annie Awards	Directing in an Animated Feature Production	Stéphane Aubier, Vincent Patar, Benjamin Renner	Nominated
Annie Awards	Production Design in an Animated Feature Production	Zaza, Zyk	Nominated
Annie Awards	Writing in an Animated Feature Production	Daniel Pennac	Nominated
Annie Awards	Editorial in an Animated Feature Production	Fabienne Alvarez-Giro	Nominated
Belgian Film Critics Association	Grand Prix		Nominated
Cannes Film Festival	Art Cinema Award (Directors' Fortnight)	Stéphane Aubier, Vincent Patar, Benjamin Renner	Nominated
Cannes Film Festival	Prix SACD (Directors' Fortnight)	Stéphane Aubier, Vincent Patar, Benjamin Renner	Nominated
Cannes Film Festival	Prix SACD (Directors' Fortnight) - Special Mention	Stéphane Aubier, Vincent Patar, Benjamin Renner	Won
César Awards	Best Animated Film	Stéphane Aubier, Vincent Patar, Benjamin Renner, Didier Brunner, Henri Magalon	Won
Dubai International Film Festival	People's Choice Award	Stéphane Aubier, Vincent Patar, Benjamin Renner	Won
Galway Film Fleadh	Audience Award for Best International Feature		Runner-up
Gijón International Film Festival	Enfant terrible Prize for Best Feature Film		Nominated
Los Angeles Film Critics Association Awards	Best Animated Feature		Won
Magritte Awards	Best Film		Won
Magritte Awards	Best Director	Stéphane Aubier, Vincent Patar	Won
Magritte Awards	Best Sound	Frédéric Demolder, Emmanuel de Boissieu, Luc Thomas, Franco Piscopo	Won
Portland International Film Festival	Audience Award For Best Animated Feature	Stephane Aubier, Vincent Patar, Benjamin Renner	Won
Satellite Awards	Satellite Award for Best Animated or Mixed Media Feature		Nominated
Seattle International Film Festival	Youth Jury Award		Won
Toronto International Film Festival	People's Choice Award for Best Drama Feature Film		Nominated

== TV series ==
A television series adapted from the film, Ernest & Celestine, The Collection, consisting of 52 13-minute episodes was broadcast on France 5 on 1 April 2017. In late 2017, a selection of four episodes of the series was released in theatres under the title Ernest & Celestine in Winter.

== Sequel ==
In February 2022, StudioCanal announced that a sequel entitled Ernest & Celestine: A Trip to Gibberitia was in production, to be released on 14 December 2022. The film was directed by Julien Chheng and Jean-Christophe Roger.
