= Jean Le Peltier =

Belgian-French director and actor

- Born: 1985 (age 40–41); Fontainebleau, France
- Occupations: Director; writer; actor
- Years active: 2009–present

Jean Le Peltier (born 1985) is a Belgian-French film and stage director, writer and actor.

After developing an interest in acting, Le Peltier studied performing arts at the Rennes 2 University in France and graduated from there in 2008. He began working in theatre appearing in productions from Belgium and France over the span of ten years. He later started directing his own stage productions, most notably with the theatrical company Ives & Pony.

He made his film debut in Madly in Life (2020), a comedy-drama film that follows an aging woman (Jo Deseure) dealing with her progressing dementia with the help of her son (Le Peltier). The film marked his fourth collaboration with directors Ann Sirot and Raphaël Balboni, after starring in their previous short films. At the 11th Magritte Awards, Madly in Life received twelve nominations and won seven awards, including Best Actor for Le Peltier.

== Filmography ==
Year	Title	Role	Notes
2020	Madly in Life	Alex	Magritte Award for Best Actor
2021	Our Men	Romain	
