= Ernest & Celestine: A Trip to Gibberitia =

- French theatrical release poster
- French: Ernest et Célestine: Le Voyage en Charabie
- Directed by: Julien Chheng; Jean-Christophe Roger
- Written by: Guillaume Mautalent; Sebastien Oursel
- Story by: Agnès Bidaud; Didier Brunner
- Based on: Ernest & Celestine by Gabrielle Vincent
- Produced by: Didier Brunner; Damien Brunner; Stéphan Roelants
- Starring: Lambert Wilson; Pauline Brunner
- Edited by: Nazim Meslem
- Music by: Vincent Courtois
- Production companies: Folivari; Melusine Productions; France TV Cinema; La Parti Productions; Les Armateurs
- Distributed by: StudioCanal
- Release date: December 14, 2022
- Running time: 80 minutes
- Countries: France; Luxembourg
- Language: French

Ernest & Celestine: A Trip to Gibberitia (Ernest et Célestine: Le Voyage en Charabie) is a 2022 animated adventure comedy drama film directed by Julien Chheng and Jean-Christophe Roger. The film is based on a series of children's books of the same name published by the Belgian author and illustrator Gabrielle Vincent. The film is a sequel to the 2012 film Ernest & Celestine.

Announced in 2017, the film was released by StudioCanal on December 14, 2022. The film was released in the United States in 2023 by GKIDS and was nominated at the Annie Awards for Annie Award for Best Animated Feature – Independent losing to Robot Dreams.

== Cast ==
Character	Original Actor	Dub Actor
Ernest	Lambert Wilson	Andrew Kishino
Celestine	Pauline Brunner	Ashley Boettcher
Naboukov	Michel Lerousseau	David Lodge
Kamelia	Céline Ronté	Anne Yatco
Mila/Mifasol	Lévanah Solomon	Lena Josephine Marano
Octavius	Jean-Marc Pannetier	Bill Lobley
Police Chief	Christophe Lemoine	Daniel Hagen

== Synopsis ==
Ernest and Celestine return to Ernest's land, Gibberitia (Charabie in the original version), to repair his precious violin. They discover that music has been banned all over the country for several years. Ernest and Celestine are joined by new friends, including a mysterious masked avenger, to try to right this injustice and bring joy back to the land of the bears.

== Release ==
The film was released in France on December 14, 2022 and had a limited release in the United States on September 1, 2023 by GKIDS. The film was released on Blu-ray in North America on January 16, 2024.

== Reception ==
On Rotten Tomatoes, the film received a 100% and was nominated for an Annie Award for Best Animated Feature — Independent. Sandie Angulo Chen of Common Sense Media said that "So many family movies approach the two-hour mark, but there's something special about a film that can tell a good story in only 80 minutes. No drawn-out pacing issues to get through here, just a lovely film that explores deep, universal themes without pandering to its audience." Metacritic, which uses a weighted average, assigned the film a score of 78 out of 100, based on 6 critics, indicating "Generally favorable" reviews.

In France, the site Allocine offers an average of 3.7/5, based on 20 critic reviews.

The magazine Elle describes it as "a wonderful film to watch with family." According to Le Figaro, "Ten years after the first animated film, the improbable duo embarks on a new adventure full of charm and intelligence. A delightful Christmas gift."

For Télérama, "Between the beauty of the spectacle, the rebellious mischief of the tale, and the subtle reflection on family, both the one we endure and the one we choose, this gem of tenderness is much more than just a sequel: a delightful gift for all audiences, to unwrap without waiting for Christmas."

As for the newspaper Libération, it finds the film "Less moving but also radiant than the first, the next adventures of the bear and the mouse remain a delight of traditional animation."

== Accolades ==
César 2023: Best Animated Film

Award	Date	Category	Result	Ref.
Annie Awards	February 17, 2024	Best Animated Feature — Independent	Nominated	
