= Motherly =

Motherly may refer to:

- an adjective to describe mothers
- Motherly bond, the relationship between a mother and her child
- Motherly (2009 film), a Belgian film
- Motherly (2021 film), a Canadian psychological thriller film
