= Bernard Bellefroid =

Belgian film director and screenwriter

Bernard Bellefroid is a Belgian film director and screenwriter. He made his feature-length debut in 2009 with The Boat Race. The film received four nominations at the 1st Magritte Awards and won Most Promising Actor for Joffrey Verbruggen. In 2014, he wrote and directed Melody. It received a special mention at the Montreal World Film Festival and multiple nominations at the 6th Magritte Awards.
