= Benjamin Renner =

French cartoonist, animator and film maker

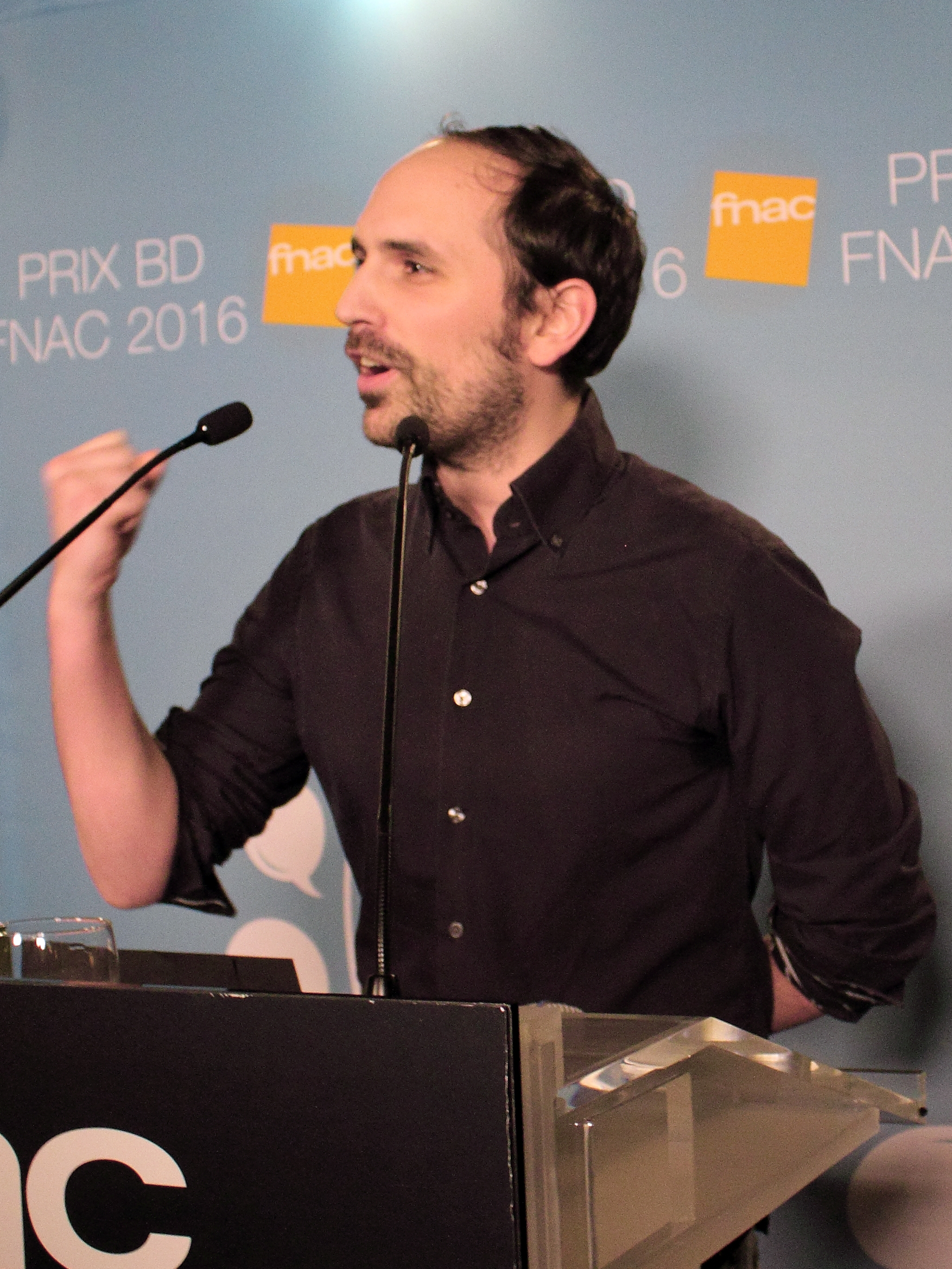
- Renner at the Prix BD Fnac in 2016
- Born: 14 November 1983 (age 42)
- Occupations: Cartoonist, animator, and filmmaker

Benjamin Renner (born 14 November 1983) is a French cartoonist, animator, and filmmaker.

Renner and his fellow producers received a 2014 Academy Awards nomination in the category of Best Animated Feature for the film Ernest & Celestine. He previously directed a short, La queue de la souris (The Mouse's Tail) in 2008.

In 2015 he published a comic, Le grand mechant renard (The Big Bad Fox), which he then adapted into a feature film released in 2017, The Big Bad Fox and Other Tales....

He also directed an original animated film for Universal Pictures and Illumination, titled Migration, which released on 22 December 2023.

== Biography ==
Benjamin Renner was born in 1983. After obtaining a scientific baccalaureate (bac S) at the Jean Monnet high school in La Queue-les-Yvelines, Benjamin Renner attended a preparatory class for art schools, then enrolled at the École des Beaux-Arts in Angoulême, from which he graduated with a Diplôme national d'arts plastiques in bande dessinée. He then entered the animation school La Poudrière, at the Cartoucherie de Bourg-lès-Valence. There, he made his animated short films, including his graduation film, La Queue de la souris, in 2007, in which a mouse is captured by a lion and must argue to convince him to let it live. After leaving the school, Renner was hired for an animated feature-film project based on the children's book series Ernest et Célestine by Gabrielle Vincent, initially working as its art director. The producer Didier Brunner then offered him the opportunity to direct, working with two more experienced animators, Vincent Patar and Stéphane Aubier. Benjamin Renner thus co-directed the film Ernest & Celestine with them.

Alongside animation, Benjamin Renner created a comic blog in 2008 under the pseudonym Reineke, which was selected for the Révélation blog award in 2009. Two albums were subsequently developed from this universe: Un bébé à livrer, published by Vraoum! in 2011, and Le Grand Méchant Renard, published by Delcourt in 2015. These stories were subsequently adapted into an animated feature film released in 2017, The Big Bad Fox and Other Tales..., directed by Benjamin Renner and Patrick Imbert.

== Filmography ==
- Le Corbeau voulant imiter l'aigle (2006) (short film)
- Le Plus Gros Président du monde (2006) (short film)
- La Queue de la souris (2007) (short film)
- Ernest & Celestine (2012) - director
- Yellowbird (2015) - visual development
- The Big Bad Fox and Other Tales... (2017) - director and writer
- Migration (2023) - director and story writer
- Minions & Monsters (2026) - additional story artist

== Comics ==
- Un bébé à livrer (2011) ISBN 9782915920550
- The Big Bad Fox (2015) ISBN 9782756051246
