= My Angel (2004 film) =

- French: Mon ange
- Directed by: Serge Frydman
- Starring: Vanessa Paradis; Vincent Rottiers
- Edited by: Valérie Deseine
- Release date: 9 December 2004
- Running time: 1h 34min
- Countries: France; Belgium
- Language: French
- Budget: $5.8 million
- Box office: $1.2 million

My Angel (French: Mon ange) is a 2004 French-Belgian drama film directed by Serge Frydman.

== Cast ==
- Vanessa Paradis - Colette
- Vincent Rottiers - Billy
- Eduardo Noriega - Romain
- Eric Ruf - Kovarski
- Claude Perron - Peggy
- Jo Deseure as Berg
- Thomas Fersen - Client café
- Anne-Marie Loop - Guichetière
- Jean-Benoît Ugeux - Client oreillons
- David Pion - Type voiture
