= The Boat Race (film) =

2009 Belgium, Luxembourg, France film production

- Directed by: Bernard Bellefroid
- Written by: Bernard Bellefroid; David Lambert
- Produced by: Patrick Quinet; Claude Waringo
- Starring: Joffrey Verbruggen; Thierry Hancisse; Sergi López
- Cinematography: Alain Marcoen
- Edited by: Yannick Leroy
- Music by: Claudine Muno and The Luna Boots
- Release dates: 9 October 2009 (FIFF); 17 February 2010 (France)
- Running time: 100 minutes
- Countries: Belgium; Luxembourg; France
- Language: French

The Boat Race (French: La Régate) is a 2009 drama film directed by Bernard Bellefroid.

== Plot synopsis ==
Alexandre is a 15-year-old boy who lives alone with his father, enduring relentless physical violence. To escape from his daily life, Alex rows on the Meuse, and has only one obsession: to win the Singles event at the Belgian Championships. At the rowing club, coach Sergi teams Alex with Pablo, despite their initial dislike for each other, and they win the Doubles event at the Belgian championships.

== Cast ==
- Joffrey Verbruggen: Alexandre
- Thierry Hancisse: Thierry
- Sergi López: Sergi
- Pénélope Lévêque: Murielle
- David Murgia: Pablo
- Hervé Sogne: Franco
- Stéphanie Blanchoud: Laetitia
- Jean-François Wolff: Jean

== Reception ==
The film received four nominations at the 1st Magritte Awards and won Most Promising Actor for Joffrey Verbruggen.
