= Christelle Cornil =

Belgian actress (born 1977)

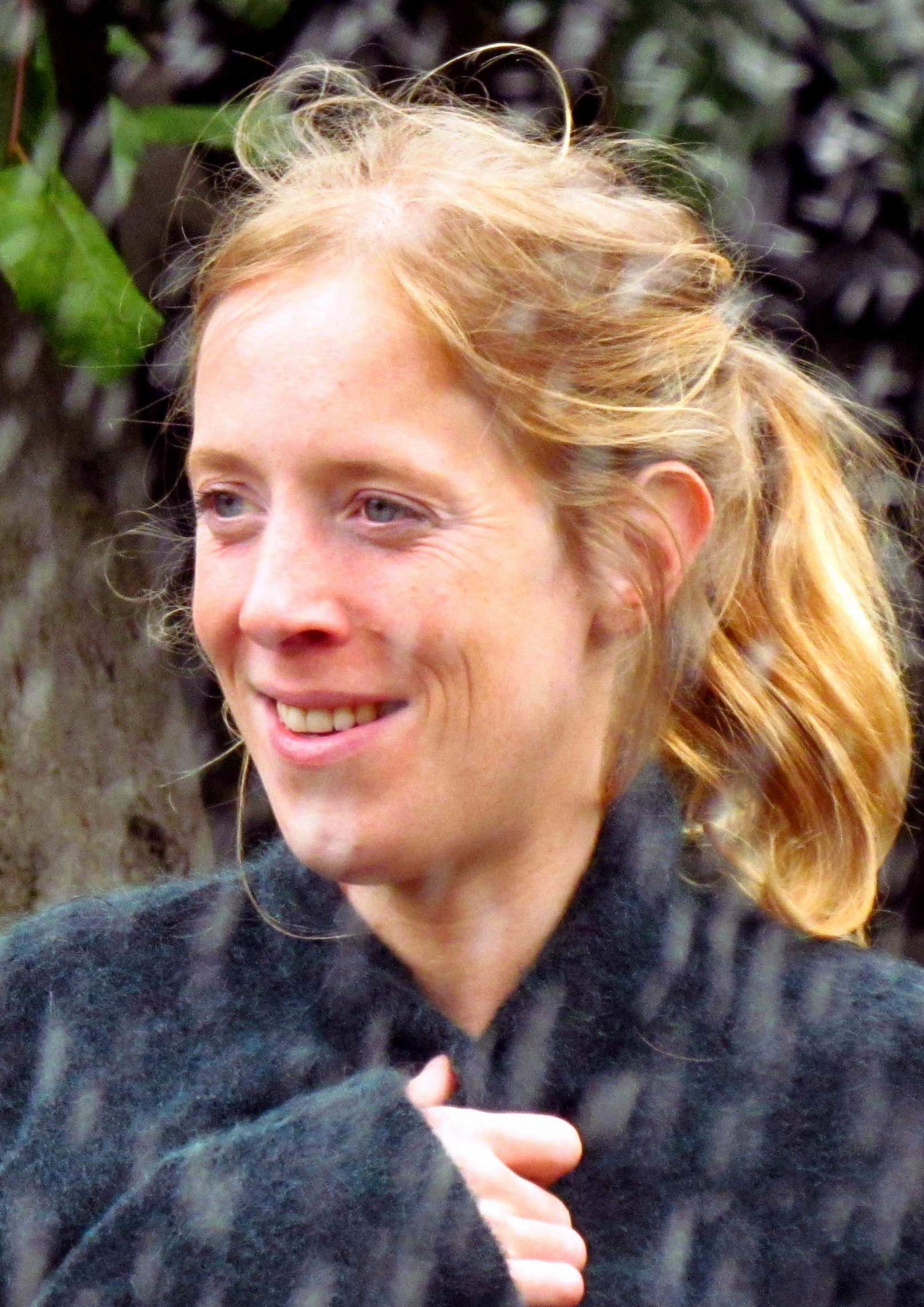
- Born: 28 August 1977 (age 48); Brussels, Belgium
- Occupation: Actress
- Years active: 2000–present
- Website: www.christellecornil.com

Christelle Cornil (French pronunciation: [kʁistɛl kɔʁnil]; born 28 August 1977) is a Belgian actress. Her acting credits include Le Vélo de Ghislain Lambert, Soeur Sourire, Illegal, Mr. Average, Beauties at War, Julie & Julia, OSS 117: Lost in Rio, My Queen Karo, The Round Up, The Conquerors, Au nom de ma fille and The Unknown Girl. She received the Magritte Award for Best Supporting Actress for Illegal.

== Filmography ==
- 2001: Le Vélo de Ghislain Lambert
- 2006: Mr. Average
- 2008: Beauties at War
- 2009: Julie & Julia
- 2009: Mr. Nobody (film)
- 2010: The Round Up (2010 film)
- 2010: Sans laisser de traces
- 2011: Let My People Go! (2011 film)
- 2012: Approved for Adoption
- 2012: Elles (film)
- 2013: Mr. Morgan's Last Love
- 2013: The Conquerors (2013 film)
- 2013: The Finishers
- 2014: Mea Culpa (film)
- 2014: Two Days, One Night
- 2015: The Roommates Party
- 2016: Kalinka (film)
- 2021: OSS 117: From Africa with Love
- 2022: You Will Not Have My Hate
- 2022: Orlando
