= Superstar (2012 film) =

2012 film

- Film poster
- Directed by: Xavier Giannoli
- Written by: Xavier Giannoli; Marcia Romano
- Produced by: Edouard Weil
- Starring: Kad Merad; Cécile De France
- Cinematography: Christophe Beaucarne
- Edited by: Célia Lafitedupont
- Music by: Sinclair
- Distributed by: Wild Bunch Distribution
- Release dates: 30 August 2012 (Venice); 29 August 2012 (France)
- Running time: 112 minutes
- Country: France
- Language: French
- Box office: $1.5 million

Superstar is a 2012 French comedy film directed by Xavier Giannoli. The film was selected to compete for the Golden Lion at the 69th Venice International Film Festival.

== Plot ==
Martin Kazinski (Kad Merad) is a middle-aged working stiff who, on the train to work one morning, discovers he has inexplicably become a celebrity. His simple life is turned upside down. As he asks "Why?" his life becomes more and more complicated. He sees a lawyer for help in getting people to leave him alone, and is put in contact with a media agent, Fleur Arnaud, whose efforts inadvertently make him more and more famous. When he appears on Fleur's television show, everything he says is twisted into a symbolic statement, and the more he pleads for his privacy, the more famous he becomes. He is told he is causing disruption at his job and is pursued by well-wishers and paparazzi. Others are jealous and resent his "success." Fleur and he grow close, though she is having an affair with the manipulative producer of her television program.

Martin is now broke, and the TV studio offers him a chance to cash in on his fame. He turns them down. A TV host introduces him to some shady characters who try to get him involved in their activities but he refuses them too. Suddenly the public turns against him. A woman strikes and spits on him in a grocery store, and he is pursued by a mob. Fleur decides to move in with the TV producer. Martin quarrels with her, then falls into despair as he becomes an object of public vilification. He hides out with a drag queen (Philomène) who appeared with him at a talk show. He returns to the studio to ask for help but is treated with contempt by the producer, who does however reveal that Fleur has disappeared.

Months later we see Martin at a private launch of an autobiography he has had ghost-written for him. Some of his friends from his celebrity period are still around, but he has apparently been largely forgotten. The doorbell rings and, when he opens it, Fleur is there. He tells her to leave, but a passage Philomène reads from the autobiography makes him change his mind and he goes after her. As the film ends, the two seem to be returning to the launch.

== Cast ==
- Kad Merad as Martin Kazinski
- Cécile De France as Fleur Arnaud
- Louis-Do de Lencquesaing as Jean-Baptiste
- Cédric Ben Abdallah as Alban (credited as Ben)
- Alberto Sorbelli as Alberto
- Pierre Diot as Morizot
- Christophe Kourotchkine as Fabrice
- Stéphan Wojtowicz as Edouard Laurence
- Garba Tounkara as Saia
- Hervé Pierre as Doctor Barreinbhom (as Hervé Pierre member of the Comédie Française)
- Romain Medioni as Philomène
- Mathias Camberlein as Julien
- Ariane Brodier as Marion
- Joffrey Verbruggen as Malone
- Michaël Abiteboul as Martin's colleague
- Louise Coldefy as journalist
