= Le Vélo de Ghislain Lambert =

2001 film

- Directed by: Philippe Harel
- Written by: Olivier Dazat; Philippe Harel; Benoît Poelvoorde
- Produced by: Arnauld de Battice; Bertrand Faivre; Sylvain Goldberg; Adeline Lecallier; Alain Rocca
- Starring: Benoît Poelvoorde; José Garcia; Daniel Ceccaldi
- Narrated by: David Saunders
- Cinematography: Gilles Henry
- Edited by: Bénédicte Teiger
- Music by: Philippe Eidel
- Distributed by: BAC Films
- Release date: 2001
- Running time: 119 minutes
- Countries: France, Belgium
- Language: French

Le Vélo de Ghislain Lambert is a 2001 French-Belgian comedy film directed by Philippe Harel.

== Plot ==
In the early 1970s, Ghislain Lambert, a Belgian cyclist who is born on the same day as Eddy Merckx, wants to become a cycling champion after seeing TV footage of Merckx winning his 1972-hour record. He tries to get involved with a big cycling championship, but only gets a job as a water carrier. His obsession becomes bigger when Merckx appears to him in a dream. Determined in his dream of becoming a victorious cyclist Lambert tries to look for different ways to achieve his goal...

== Cast ==
- Benoît Poelvoorde - Ghislain Lambert
- José Garcia - Claude Lambert
- Daniel Ceccaldi - Maurice Focodel
- Sacha Bourdo - Denis
- Emmanuel Quatra - Riccardo Fortuna
- Jean-Baptiste Iera - Fabrice Bouillon
- Christelle Cornil - Babette
- Jacqueline Poelvoorde-Pappaert - Madame Lambert
- Fernand Guiot - M. de Kimpe
- Antoine de Caunes - Narrator
- Frédéric Renson - Manu
- Pierre Martot - Dr. Epedex
- Éric Naggar - Le mage
- Michel de Warzée - Mr. Vandenbroek
- François Berland - TV animator
- Fabian Lion - Swedish cyclist

== See also ==
- List of films about bicycles and cycling
