= The Conquerors (2013 film) =

- Film poster
- French: Les conquérants
- Directed by: Xabi Molia
- Written by: Xabi Molia
- Produced by: Christie Molia
- Starring: Mathieu Demy; Denis Podalydès; Christian Crahay
- Cinematography: Martin de Chabaneix
- Edited by: Sébastien Sarraillé
- Music by: Benjamin Rosier
- Distributed by: Pyramide Distribution
- Release date: 25 September 2013
- Running time: 96 minutes
- Country: France
- Language: French

The Conquerors (French: Les conquérants) is a 2013 French adventure comedy film directed by Xabi Molia, with stars Mathieu Demy, Denis Podalydès and Christian Crahay, with the director playing a seventh-billed supporting role.

The film was exhibited in southwest France on 21 June 2013 at the Contis Film Festival (premiere) and, two months later (24 August) at another film festival, in Gindou. The full release in France was on 25 September, but it continued to be seen at festivals (Belgium's Festival International du Film Francophone de Namur on 1 October and Canada's Cinéfest Sudbury International Film Festival on 15 September 2014.

== Plot ==
Half-brothers Noah and Gilead attend their archeologist father's funeral and, after recounting and comparing each other's misfortunes, become convinced that their misery is caused by a curse upon their father and his descendants resulting from the father's theft of the Holy Grail. Their solution is to embark on a quest for the Grail and return it to the location from which it was disturbed and removed by their father.

== Cast ==
- Mathieu Demy as Noah
- Denis Podalydès as Gilead
- Christian Crahay as Del Sarto
- Michel Dubois as Mr. Van der Eecken
- Julie Kapour as Madam Van der Eecken
- Michel Molia as Michel
- Xabi Molia as Hector
- Charlotte Krenz as Maja
- Christelle Cornil as Agnès
- Christine Dargenton as Nurse
- Florence Muller as Doctor
- Yassine Fadel as Morgan
- Eric Chignara: President
- Maxence Brabant as Maxence
- Didier Colfs as President of adverse club
- Marc Bodnar as Philippe
- Régis Royer as Director
- Hugues Hausman as Vigil keeper
- Cédric Zimmerlin as Merchant
- Gautier About as Doctor
- Émilie Scarlett Moget as Eider
- Philippe Oyhamburu as Ramuntxo
- Amélie Glenn as Amane
- Jean-Claude Drouot as Joseph Tadoussac
- Mathieu Busson as Sami
- Alice Pehlivanyan as Pantxika
- Lee Michelsen as Jarle
- Anna-Lena Strasse as Freya
