= Les Monos =

- Created by: Christian Rauth; Daniel Rialet
- Starring: Christian Rauth; Daniel Rialet
- Country of origin: France
- No. of series: 2
- No. of episodes: 12

Production
- Running time: 90 minutes

Original release
- Network: France 2
- Release: 1999 – 2004

Les Monos is a French television drama and comedy series which premiered in France in 1999. The series was created by Christian Rauth and Daniel Rialet, who also play the lead roles. Each episode revolves aroundl training of a group of young persons from different locations in France.

== Synopsis ==
Two experienced teachers help teenagers in trouble by organizing practice during school holidays.

== Cast ==
- Christian Rauth: Manu (1999–2001, 2003)
- Daniel Rialet: JP (1999–2001, 2003)
- Éva Darlan: Margot (1999–2001)
- Jonathan Tiecoura: Diouk
- Thierry Redler: Luc (2002–2003)
- Eric Métayer: Loïc (2002–2003)
- Jean-Claude Adelin: Ben (2004)
- Marc Duret: Lino (2004)
- Valérie Vogt: The Mayor (2002)
