= Sleepless Night (2010 film) =

- Directed by: Samuel Tilman
- Written by: Samuel Tilman
- Produced by: Marie Besson
- Starring: Myriem Akeddiou; Alain Eloy; Corentin Lobet
- Cinematography: Frederic Noirhomme
- Edited by: Joel Mann
- Music by: Pierre De Surgères
- Release date: October 3, 2010 (FIFF)
- Running time: 20 minutes
- Language: French

Sleepless Night (French: Nuit blanche) is a Belgian short film directed by Samuel Tilman. The film won the 2011 Magritte Award for Best Short Film.

The film follows a rescue team which tries to save a young woman and her mountaineering companions stuck in the mountain in a winter's night.
