= My Queen Karo =

2009 film by Dorothée Van Den Berghe

- Film poster
- Directed by: Dorothée Van Den Berghe
- Written by: Dorothée Van Den Berghe
- Produced by: Frank Van Passel
- Starring: Matthias Schoenaerts; Déborah François; Anna Franziska Jaeger
- Cinematography: Jan Vancaillie
- Edited by: Marie-Hélène Dozo
- Music by: Peter Vermeersch
- Release dates: 12 September 2009 (TIFF); 28 October 2009 (Belgium)
- Running time: 101 minutes
- Countries: Netherlands; Belgium
- Languages: Dutch; French

My Queen Karo is a 2009 drama film. It was directed by Dorothée Van Den Berghe, produced by Frank Van Passel, and starring Matthias Schoenaerts, Déborah François, and Anna Franziska Jaeger. The film tells the story of Karo, a ten-year-old girl who witnesses the moral dilemmas of free love when her parents join a squatter community in 1970s Amsterdam.

The film received three nominations at the 1st Magritte Awards.

== Cast ==
- Anna Franziska Jaeger as Karo
- Matthias Schoenaerts as Raven
- Déborah François as Dalia
- Rifka Lodeizen as Jacky
- Maria Kraakman as Alice
- Hadewych Minis as Rosa
- Nico Sturm as Barré
- Ward Weemhoff as Joop
- Christelle Cornil as Anne Clare
- Bastiaan Rook as Kraker

== Production ==
From the beginning, director Dorothée Van Den Berghe had chosen Anna Franziska Jaeger to play Karo, but the film took two years to put together, and by that time, she was too old for the part as she had written. "She had breasts already, and the part I had written was definitely for a child who was younger than that. So.. I held auditions and auditions, but I never found that quality, what I found in her. I rewrote the script, then, and we had to rethink how to shoot the nudity, for example, because of her breasts. But I think it puts the film into a better perspective, a child that age."
