= The Secret (2000 film) =

- French theatrical release poster
- Directed by: Virginie Wagon
- Written by: Virginie Wagon; Erick Zonca
- Starring: Anne Coesens; Michel Bompoil; Tony Todd
- Distributed by: Optimum Releasing
- Release date: November 1, 2000
- Running time: 104 minutes 107 minutes 109 minutes
- Country: France
- Languages: English; French

The Secret (also titled Le Secret) is a 2000 French romantic drama film directed by Virginie Wagon and starring Anne Coesens, Michel Bompoil and Tony Todd. It is Wagon's feature directorial debut.

== Cast ==
- Anne Coesens as Marie
- Michel Bompoil as François
- Tony Todd as Bill
- Frédéric Sauzay as Luc
- Jacqueline Jehanneuf as La mère de Marie
- Natalya Ermilova as Ana
- Valérie Vogt as Séverine
- Quentin Rossi as Paul
- Aladin Reibel as Rémy

== Release ==
The film was released in France on November 1, 2000 and in the United States on August 23, 2001.

== Reception ==
David Parkinson of Radio Times awarded the film three stars out of five.
