= Tomorrow We Move =

- Film poster
- Directed by: Chantal Akerman
- Written by: Chantal Akerman; Eric de Kuyper
- Produced by: Paulo Branco
- Starring: Sylvie Testud; Aurore Clément; Natacha Régnier
- Cinematography: Sabine Lancelin
- Edited by: Claire Atherton
- Music by: Sonia Wieder-Atherton
- Production companies: Gemini Films; Paradise Films; Arte France Cinéma; Radio Télévision Belge Francophone
- Distributed by: Gemini Films (France); Clap d'Ort Films (Belgium)
- Release dates: February 2004 (Berlin); 3 March 2004 (France); 12 May 2004 (Belgium)
- Running time: 110 minutes
- Countries: France; Belgium
- Language: French
- Budget: $3.4 million
- Box office: $530.000

Tomorrow We Move (French: Demain on déménage) is a 2004, French-Belgian comedy film directed by Chantal Akerman. It won the Lumière Award for Best French-Language Film in 2005.

== Cast ==
- Sylvie Testud as Charlotte
- Aurore Clément as Catherine
- Jean-Pierre Marielle as Popernick
- Natacha Régnier as The Pregnant Woman
- Lucas Belvaux as M. Delacre
- Dominique Reymond as Mme Delacre
- Elsa Zylberstein as Michèle
- Anne Coesens as Mme Dietrich
- Eric Godon as Mover
