= Valérie Vogt =

French actress (born 1962)

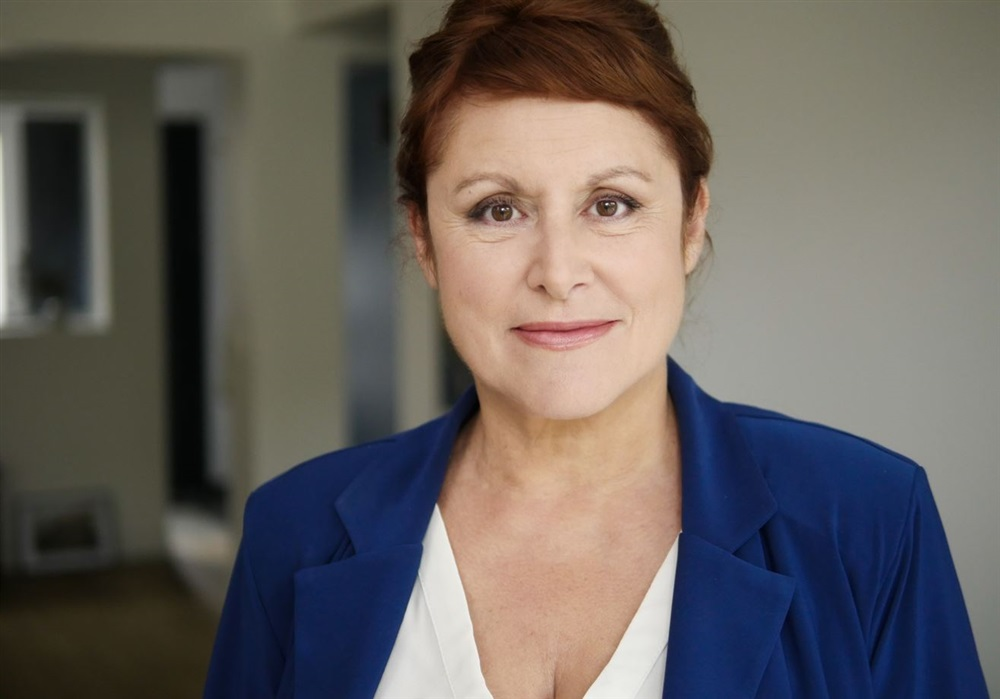
- Born: 25 October 1962 (age 63); Reims, France
- Years active: 1986–present

Valérie Vogt (born 25 October 1962) is a French actress.

== Filmography ==
Year	Title	Role	Director	Notes
1988	Un médecin des lumières		René Allio	TV movie
1992	Le bal des casse-pieds		Yves Robert	
1992	Maigret	Tania	José Pinheiro	TV series (1 episode)
1993	La femme à abattre	Nina	Guy Pinon	
1994	Le ruban de Möbius		Laurence Maynard	Short
1994	Les Cinq Dernières Minutes	Madame Lefebvre	Alain Wermus	TV series (1 episode)
1994	Madame le proviseur	Fonteneau	José Pinheiro (2)	TV series (1 episode)
1995	Pullman paradis	Ginette Nollet	Michèle Rosier	
1995	Lulu roi de France		Bernard Uzan	TV movie
1997	Messieurs les enfants	Arlette	Pierre Boutron	
1997	Nini	The Hostess	Myriam Touzé	TV movie
1997	L'amour dans le désordre	Brigitte	Élisabeth Rappeneau	TV movie
1997	Julie Lescaut	Justine Calderon	Charlotte Brandstrom	TV series (1 episode)
1998	Bonnes vacances	Mireille	Pierre Badel	TV movie
1999	C'est pas ma faute!	Madame Miniac	Jacques Monnet	
1999	Dessine-moi un jouet	La Guitejean	Hervé Baslé	TV movie
1999	Joséphine, ange gardien	Corinne	Pierre Joassin	TV series (1 episode)
2000	Le secret	Séverine	Virginie Wagon	
2000	La vérité vraie	Suzy	Fabrice Cazeneuve	TV movie
2001	Ligne 208	Véronique	Bernard Dumont	
2001	Objectif bac	Maryse	Patrick Volson	TV movie
2001	Le vol de la colombe	Annick	Michel Sibra	TV movie
2001	Le maire		Patrick Volson (2)	TV movie
2002	Rue des plaisirs	Valérie	Patrice Leconte	
2002	Un homme en colère	Martha	Marc Angelo	TV series (1 episode)
2002	Les Monos	The mayor	Williams Crépin	TV series (1 episode)
2003	L'adieu	Tata	François Luciani	TV movie
2003	Les Thibault	Marguerite	Jean-Daniel Verhaeghe	TV mini-series
2003	Les Cordier, juge et flic	Adélaïde	Jean-Pierre Vergne	TV series (1 episode)
2003	Avocats & associés	Lili	Philippe Triboit	TV series (1 episode)
2004	La nourrice	The milk Lady	Renaud Bertrand	TV movie
2004	Moitié-moitié	Maryse Joffrin	Laurent Firode	TV movie
2004	Premiers secours	Annette	Didier Delaître	TV series
2005	Un vrai bonheur, le film	Valérie	Didier Caron	
2005	Cyrano de Ménilmontant	Sylvie	Marc Angelo (2)	TV movie
2005	Le frangin d'Amérique	Juliette's mother	Jacques Fansten	TV movie
2005	Faites comme chez vous	Agnès Costa	Pascal Heylbroeck	TV series (19 episodes)
2006	Les irréductibles	restaurant's Young Lady	Renaud Bertrand (2)	
2006	Comment lui dire	Charlotte	Laurent Firode (2)	TV movie
2007	Joséphine, ange gardien	The banker	Pascal Heylbroeck (2)	TV series (1 episode)
2009	Sœur Thérèse.com	Le Balto's Boss	Dominique Tabuteau	TV series (1 episode)
2010	Tempêtes	Rita	Dominique Baron, Marc Rivière & Michel Sibra (2)	TV movie
2010	Julie Lescaut	Maryse Foissac	Didier Delaître (2)	TV series (1 episode)
2011	La dérade	Babette	Pascal Latil	Short
2011	Plus belle la vie	Claire Souchal	Several	TV series (12 episodes)
2012	Par amour	Anne	Laurent Firode (3)	
2012	La victoire au bout du bâton	Brigitte	Jean-Michel Verner	TV movie
2012	Duo	Liliane	Patrick Volson (3)	TV mini-series
2012	Joséphine, ange gardien	Dominique	Pascal Heylbroeck (3)	TV series (1 episode)
2014	Gazelle		Jean-François Pignon	
2014	Tiens-toi droite	The Survey's Woman	Katia Lewkowicz	
2016	Ma famille t'adore déjà	The turnkey	Jérôme Commandeur & Alan Corno	
2016	Dehors, tu vas avoir si froid		Arnaud Sadowski	
2016	Le Fruit du Désir	The Psy	Thierry Pradervand	Short
2017	Martin, sexe faible	Sylvie Murger	Paul Lapierre & Juliette Tresanini	TV series (2 episodes)

== Theater ==
Year	Title	Author	Director	Notes
1986–87	La Religieuse	Denis Diderot	Xavier Marcheschi	Théâtre de la Cîté Universitaire
1987	La Méprise	Pierre de Marivaux	Philippe Adrien	Théâtre de l'Athénée
1987	The Crucible	Arthur Miller	Marie-Claire Valène	Festival d'Angers
1987	Un rêve excellent	Jean-Michel Guillery	Michèle Venard	Maison de la Culture de Bourges
1987–88	Goeth Wilhelm Meister	Jean-Pol Fargeau	Léonidas Strapatsakis	Théâtre du Gymnase Marseille
1988	Africa Pole Express	Hervé Royer	Gilbert Rouvière	Festival d'Alès
1988	Le camp	Pierre Bourgeade	Dominique Quehec	Théâtre 14
1988–89	The Way of the World	William Congreve	Michel Dubois	Comédie de Caen
1989	Medea	Euripides	Dominique Quehec (2)	Théâtre 13
1990	A Midsummer Night's Dream	William Shakespeare	Jérôme Savary	Théâtre national de Chaillot & Festival d'Avignon
1991	Andromaque	Jean Racine	Anne Petit	Théâtre 13
1992	The Misanthrope	Molière	Grégori Baquet	Liban
1993	Nuptials	Albert Camus	Baki Boumaza	Lausanne
1993–94	The Resistible Rise of Arturo Ui	Bertolt Brecht	Jérôme Savary (2)	Théâtre national de Chaillot
1995	Chantecler	Edmond Rostand	Jérôme Savary (3)	Théâtre national de Chaillot
1996	State of Siege	Diane Niederman	D. Romand	Comédie de Reims
1997	Night in the night	François Billetdoux	D. Romand (2)	Comédie de Reims
1998–2000	Le Cid	Pierre Corneille	Thomas Le Douarec	Théâtre de la Madeleine, Théâtre Marigny & Théâtre Antoine
2000	Medea	Jean Vauthier	Félix Pruvost	Théâtre des arènes de Montmartre
2001	Tartuffe	Molière	Panchika Velez	Théâtre de la Vinaigrerie
2002–03	Un vrai bonheur	Didier Caron	Didier Caron	Théâtre Hébertot & Théâtre Fontaine
2006	L'Illusion Comique	Pierre Corneille	Marion Bierry	Théâtre Poche Montparnasse
2006	A fond la caisse	Franck Didier	Jérôme Foucher	Théâtre de Montreux-Riviera & La Grande Comédie
2007	Un vrai bonheur 2	Didier Caron	Didier Caron (2)	Théatre Rive Gauche
2007–08	Je t'avais dit, tu m'avais dit	Jean Tardieu	Christophe Luthringer	Théâtre du Lucernaire
2009	J'ai 20 ans, je t'emmerde	Roger Louret	Roger Louret	Nouveau paladins
2010	Coach	Pierre-Olivier Scotto	Julie Carquac	Théâtre St Georges
2010	Mike Brant	Thomas Le Douarec	Thomas Le Douarec (2)	Théâtre Comédia
2011	Bouleverse(e)	Anouche Setbon	Brunon Banon	Théâtre de l'Atelier
2012–13	Accalmies Passagères	Xavier Daugreilh	Thierry Harcourt	Le Splendid
2013	The Diary of Anne Frank	Éric-Emmanuel Schmitt	Steve Suissa	Théâtre Rive Gauche
2013	Ne bousculez pas la table à poèmes...	Jean-Claude Pirotte	Valérie Vogt	Tour
2013–14	Les Palmes de monsieur Schutz	Jean-Noël Fenwick	Patrick Zard'	Théâtre Michel
2014	Le Legs	Pierre de Marivaux	Marion Bierry (2)	Théâtre Poche Montparnasse
2015–16	Représailles	Éric Assous	Anne Bourgeois	Théâtre de la Michodière
2016–17	Edmond	Alexis Michalik	Alexis Michalik	Théâtre du Palais-Royal
