= Joffrey Verbruggen =

Belgian actor

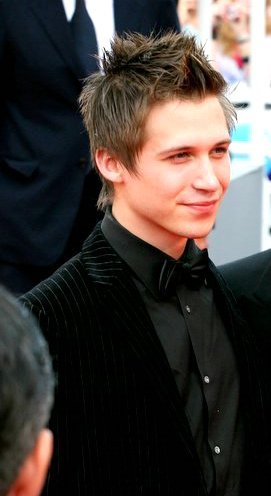
- Joffrey Verbruggen at the 2010 Cannes Film Festival
- Born: 7 February 1989 (age 36); Bruxelles, Belgium
- Occupation: Actor
- Years active: 2009–present

Joffrey Verbruggen (born 7 February 1989 in Brussels) is a Belgian actor. His acting credits include Unspoken (2008), The Boat Race (2009), Superstar (2012), Dead Man Talking (2012). He received the Magritte Award for Most Promising Actor for his work in The Boat Race.

== Filmography ==
=== Cinema ===
Year	Title	Role	Director	Notes
2009	Unspoken	Benjamin	Fien Troch	
2010	Krach	Tony	Fabrice Genestal	
2010	The Boat Race	Alexandre	Bernard Bellefroid	
2011	Room service	Thierry	Guido De Craene	Short
2012	Superstar	Malone	Xavier Giannoli	
2012	Dead Man Talking	Ruy Blas	Patrick Ridremont	
2014	Territoire	The hiker	Vincent Paronnaud	Short
2015	Les baloches	Joffrey	Robert Hospyan	Short
2017	The Station	The owner of the station	Patrick Ridremont	Short
2019	Girls with Balls	Serge	Olivier Afonso	
2020	Lucky	Andy	Olivier Van Hoofstadt	
2021	Bula	The healer	Boris Baum	
2021	Pourris gâtés	Matthias	Nicolas Cuche	

=== Television ===
Year	Title	Role	Director	Notes
2011	Une vie française	Young Paul Blick	Jean-Pierre Sinapi	TV movie
2012	L'homme de ses rêves	Zac	Christophe Douchand	TV movie
2018	Champion	Fab	Mounir Ait Hamou, ...	TV mini-series
2021	L'Opéra	Erwan	Inti Calfat, ...	TV series (1 episode)

== Awards and nominations ==
Year	Award	Nominated work	Result
2011	Magritte Award for Most Promising Actor	The Boat Race	Won
