= A Town Called Panic (film) =

2009 film by Stéphane Aubier and Vincent Patar

- Belgian theatrical release poster
- French: Panique au village
- Directed by: Stéphane Aubier; Vincent Patar
- Written by: Stéphane Aubier; Guillaume Malandrin; Vincent Patar; Vincent Tavier
- Based on: A Town Called Panic by Stéphane Aubier and Vincent Patar
- Produced by: Philippe Kauffmann; Vincent Tavier
- Starring: Stéphane Aubier; Jeanne Balibar; Nicolas Buysse; Véronique Dumont; Bruce Ellison; Fred Jannin; Bouli Lanners; Vincent Patar; Benoît Poelvoorde; David Ricci
- Cinematography: Jan Vandenbussche
- Edited by: Anne-Laure Guégan
- Music by: Dionysos; French Cowboy
- Production companies: La Parti Productions; Coproduction Office; Beast Animation; Gébéka Films; Les Films du Grognon; Made in Productions; Mélusine Productions; RTBF
- Distributed by: Cinéart (Belgium); Gébéka Films (France)
- Release dates: 21 May 2009 (Cannes); 17 June 2009 (Belgium); 28 October 2009 (France)
- Running time: 76 minutes
- Countries: Belgium; France; Luxembourg
- Language: French
- Box office: $505,699

A Town Called Panic (French: Panique au village, lit. 'Panic at the Village') is a 2009 stop-motion animated fantasy adventure comedy film directed by Stéphane Aubier and Vincent Patar from a screenplay co-written by Aubier, Patar, Guillaume Malandrin and Vincent Tavier. The film is based on the French-language Belgian animated series and stars the voices of Aubier, Jeanne Balibar, Nicolas Buysse, Véronique Dumont, Bruce Ellison, Fred Jannin, Bouli Lanners, Patar, Benoît Poelvoorde and David Ricci.

The film premiered at the 2009 Cannes Film Festival and was the first stop-motion film to be screened at the festival. The film was released theatrically in Belgium on 17 June 2009 by Cinéart and in France on 28 October 2009 by Gébéka Films. The film received generally positive reviews from film critics.

== Plot ==
Friends Cowboy, Indian, and Horse live in a rural house together peacefully. Cowboy and Indian forget Horse's birthday, and come up with the idea of building him a brick barbecue. Not wanting Horse to find out they forgot, they get him out of the house by convincing their neighbor Steven to ask Horse to pick his animals up from the nearby music school. There, Horse meets his love interest, Mrs. Jacqueline Longray, a fellow horse who is also a music teacher. When he attempts to play piano for her, she offers to give him lessons.

Back at the house, Indian attempts to order the fifty bricks needed for the grill, but Cowboy accidentally orders fifty million. They get rid of the excess bricks by building them into a cube and putting them on top of the house, then build the grill. That night, the house collapses under the weight of the bricks. Irate, Horse makes Cowboy and Indian help rebuild the house. When they try to put up the walls, an unknown figure continues to steal them. When staking out the house to find the culprits, the trio discover the walls are being stolen by a family of aquatic creatures whose heads are shaped like cones. All but one of them escape with the wall. They chase the straggler, Gerard, off of a cliff, where they fall into the Earth's core. Gerard escapes.

Climbing out, they find themselves in the middle of a tundra. While wandering throughout, they are sucked into a giant penguin robot that is being used by incomprehensible, super-strong scientists to make and throw giant snowballs. They catch up with Gerard, but they are all subsequently captured and put to work by the scientists. While the scientists battle a rogue mammoth, the group escapes by setting a snowball to launch at the house and climbing into it. At the last second, Gerard sets it for his home under the sea.

Gerard swims off when the snowball lands and the three give chase, donning scuba masks (Cowboy simply puts a TV on his head) and swimming after him. They find an underwater version of their house, revealing Gerard and his family wanted the walls to build their own house. The creatures chase the trio off with a group of barracudas, but they come back and trick the creatures into a hole by Horse posing as Santa Claus. They use a sawfish to destroy their house and escape to the surface, but the creatures follow them and attack with swordfish. Steven, his wife, and his animals help fight back. In the process, Steven's house explodes with water and the countryside is flooded.

One year later, Gerard's family is an accepted part of the community, and Horse is now a skilled piano player and dating Longray, who throws a surprise birthday party for him in an underwater department store. Cowboy and Indian accidentally set off Horse's birthday present, a giant firework, causing a giant fireworks display that destroys the landscape as the credits roll.

== Voice cast ==
- Stéphane Aubier as Cowboy, Max Briquenet, Mr Ernotte
- Jeanne Balibar as Madame Jacqueline Longrée (spelled "Longray" in some English subtitles)
- Nicolas Buysse as Sheep, Jean-Paul
- François De Brigode as Sportscaster
- Véronique Dumont as Janine
- Bruce Ellison as Indian
- Christine Grulois as Cow, Student
- Frédéric Jannin as Policeman, Gérard, Brick Delivery Man
- Bouli Lanners as Postman, Simon, Cow
- Christelle Mahy as Chicken
- Éric Muller as Rocky Gaufres, Music Student 1
- François Neyken as Pig
- Vincent Patar as Horse, Mother Atlante
- Pipou as Michel's laugh
- Franco Piscopo as Bear
- Benoît Poelvoorde as Steven
- David Ricci as Donkey, Michel
- Ben Tesseur as Scientist 1
- Alexandre von Sivers as Scientist 2

== Production ==
The film was made over the course of 260 days in a studio on the outskirts of Brussels. 1500 plastic toy figures were used during filming.

== Release ==
A Town Called Panic premiered at the Cannes Film Festival on 21 May 2009 and was released theatrically on 17 June 2009 in Belgium by Cinéart and on 28 October 2009 in France by Gébéka Films. It was also released on DVD on 20 July 2010 by Zeitgeist Video.

== Reception ==
=== Critical response ===
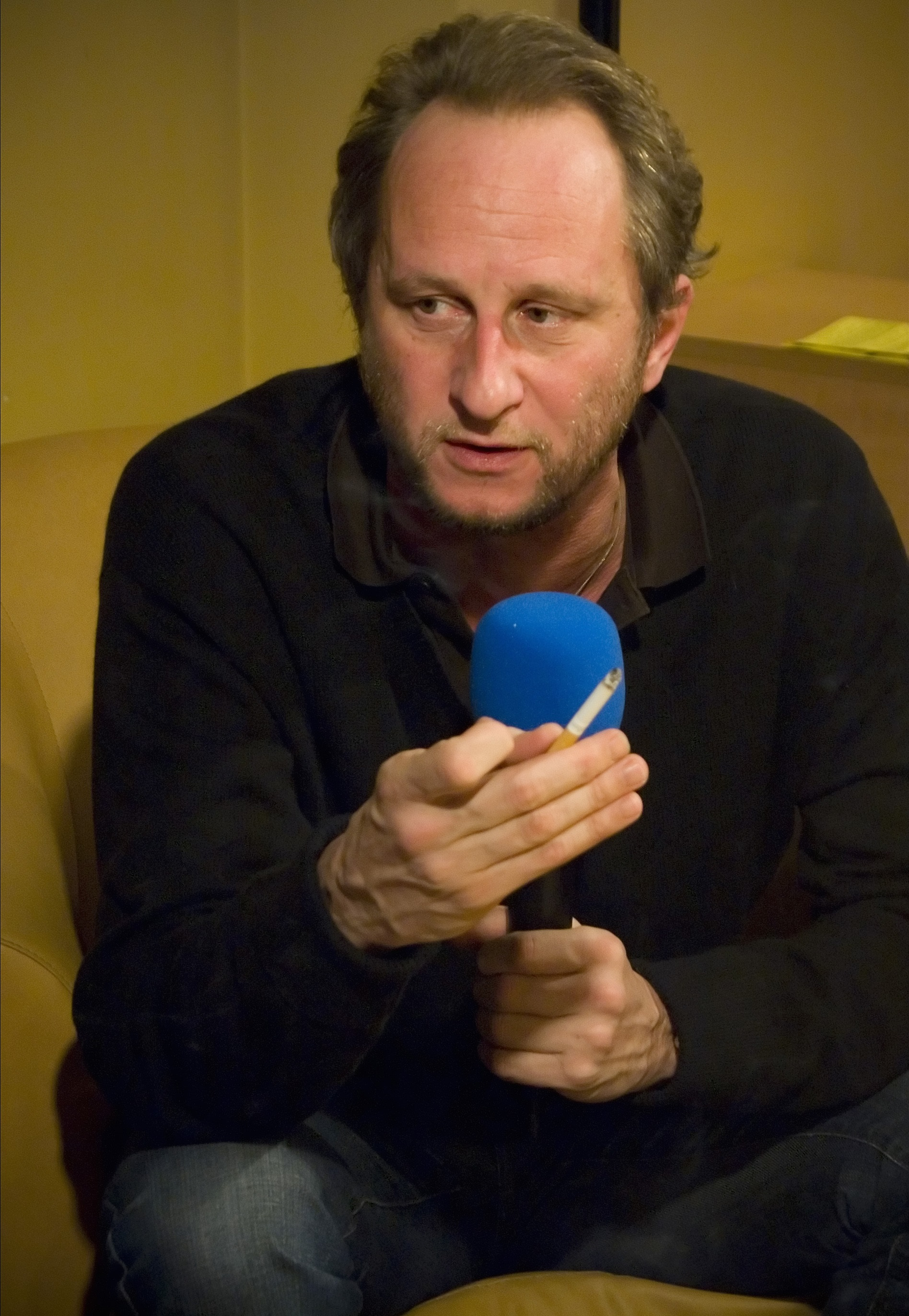
Benoît Poelvoorde was praised by critics for his performance in the film.

The film received generally positive reviews. On the review aggregator website Rotten Tomatoes, the film holds an approval rating of 81% based on 80 reviews, with an average rating of 7.1/10. The website's critics consensus reads, "A Town Called Panic is a raucous, endlessly creative animated romp with a quirky, adult sense of humor." On Metacritic, which assigns a weighted average score out of 100 to reviews from mainstream critics, the film received an average score of 70, based on 20 critics, indicating "generally favorable" reviews.

Little White Lies gave the film 4 out of 5 for enjoyment stating "wide-eyed, broad smile" although in retrospect they scored the film 3 out of 5 suggesting that "like all toys. It will have a shelf life". Empire were very positive awarding the film 4 stars, summing it up as "Toy Story on absinthe" and stating the film was "One of the year's true originals." Peter Brunette of The Hollywood Reporter was also positive summarizing that "There's really very little to say about this film beyond that it's absolutely brilliant." Roger Ebert enjoyed the film, giving it three-and-a-half out of four stars and stating that "Because the plot is just one doggoned thing after another without the slightest logic, there's no need to watch it all the way through at one sitting. If you watch it a chapter or two at a time, it should hold up nicely." Ebert later placed the film on his list of the best animated films of 2010.

=== Accolades ===
- Official Selection (Out of Competition), 2009 Cannes Film Festival.
- Official Selection, 2009 Toronto Film Festival.
- Winner, Audience Award, 2009 Fantastic Fest.
- Winner, Best Sound, 2011 Magritte Awards
- Winner, Best Production Design, 2011 Magritte Awards
