= Bruce Ellison =

English cricketer (born 1969)

Bruce Charles Aurelius Ellison (born 10 December 1969) is a former English cricketer. He was a right-handed batsman and a right-arm medium-fast bowler. He was born in King's Lynn.

Ellison studied at Durham University, where he appeared for the university first team in the 1990 Universities Athletic Union final against Exeter University, which Durham won by 6 wickets. He continued his education at Keble College, Oxford and made a single first-class appearance for Oxford University in 1993, and, while he did not bat in the match, took match figures of 2–40 with the ball.

He later made a single List A appearance for Oxfordshire against Lancashire in the 1996 NatWest Trophy, taking three wickets.
