= Jo Deseure =

Belgian actress

- Born: 9 January 1948 (age 78); Brussels, Belgium
- Education: Institut Supérieur des Arts
- Occupations: Stage actress; film actress
- Years active: 1984–present

Jo Deseure (born 9 January 1948) is a Belgian stage and film actress.

After developing an interest in acting, Deseure enrolled at the Institut Supérieur des Arts in Brussels and graduated from there in 1984. She later began working in theatre and became a regular performer at the Compagnie des Bosons in Ixelles.

She made her film debut in Toto the Hero (1991), a drama film directed by Jaco Van Dormael. Since then, Deseure has appeared in My Angel (2004), Sister Smile (2009), Sans laisser de traces (2010), and Madly in Life (2020). The latter film earned her a Magritte Award for Best Actress.

== Selected filmography ==
Year	Title	Role	Notes
1991	Toto the Hero	Sales Woman	
2004	My Angel	Berg	
2009	Sister Smile	Gabrielle Deckers	
2010	Sans laisser de traces	Etienne	
2015	Man Overboard	Christine	Nominated—Magritte Award for Best Actress
2020	Madly in Life	Suzanne Merteens	Chistera Awards for Best Actress; Magritte Award for Best Actress
