= Anne Coesens =

Belgian actress (born 1966)

- Born: July 9, 1966 (age 60)
- Occupation: Actress
- Years active: 1986–present

Anne Coesens (born 1966) is a Belgian actress. She studied at the Royal Conservatory of Brussels and the National Superior Conservatory of Dramatic Arts in Paris and works in theatre. She also appears in films – her credits include Illegal, Ma vie en rose, Private Lessons, Tomorrow We Move, and Diamant 13. She received the Magritte Award for Best Actress for Illegal which was her fourth film with Olivier Masset-Depasse.

== Filmography ==
- 1997 : Ma vie en rose
- 1997 : Alliance cherche doigt
- 1998 : Pure Fiction
- 2000 : Le Secret
- 2003 : Quand tu descendras du ciel
- 2003 : Tomorrow We Move
- 2004 : L'ennemi naturel
- 2006 : Cages
- 2006 : Darling
- 2008 : Private Lessons
- 2008 : 9mm
- 2009 : Diamant 13
- 2010 : Illegal
- 2012 : Little Lion
- 2012 : Goodbye Morocco
- 2014 : Not My Type
- 2014 : Next Year
- 2014 : All Cats Are Grey
- 2015 : April and the Twisted World
- 2015 : Jailbirds
- 2017 : Above the Law
- 2019: Never Grow Old
- 2019: Mothers' Instinct
- 2020: À la folie
- 2021: Farewell Mr. Haffmann
