= Sans laisser de traces =

- Film poster
- Directed by: Grégoire Vigneron
- Written by: Laurent Tirard; Grégoire Vigneron
- Produced by: Marc Missonnier; Olivier Delbosc
- Starring: Benoît Magimel; Julie Gayet; François-Xavier Demaison
- Narrated by: Benoît Magimel
- Cinematography: Laurent Dailland
- Edited by: Valérie Deseine
- Music by: Christophe La Pinta
- Production companies: Fidélité Films; Scope Pictures
- Distributed by: Cineart; Mars Distribution; Wild Bunch; Mongrel Media
- Release date: 10 March 2010
- Running time: 95 minutes
- Countries: France; Belgium
- Languages: French; English
- Box office: $505.000

Sans laisser de traces (also known as Immaculate, Traceless, Indelible and Indélébile) is a 2010 French crime-thriller film and Grégoire Vigneron's directorial debut.

== Plot ==
Étienne is about to succeed his father-in-law as CEO of a French company which employs 15.000 people. Some days after they have discussed their according speeches, Étienne also learns that his beautiful wife has finally become pregnant. In spite of his apparently being so lucky, Étienne is haunted by nightmares.

When Étienne runs into an old school friend, he does not recognise him immediately but soon they become again familiar. Patrick is unemployed and admires Étienne for his achievements. Étienne has hereby found somebody with whom he dares to share his secret: Étienne's career only took off because he stole a chemical formula from an unknown inventor 15 years ago.

Patrick persuades Étienne he could fix everything retroactively if he met the inventor and spoke to him. Unfortunately the man reacts in way neither of the two friends anticipated. Overwhelmed by wrath he is determined to destroy Étienne's life by suing him and eventually he poses even physically threatening. Trying to protect his friend Patrick accidentally kills the man. It is also Patrick who decides for both of them to conceal what just happened.

Étienne pays Patrick 30,000 Euros in order to get rid of him. But Patrick spends his new money on a prostitute and gets in trouble when he claims she had stolen from him. After Étienne has bailed him out he prepares to send Patrick far away. He creates a well-paid job for him in Singapore. On his way there Patrick gets arrested at the airport for smuggling drugs and his finger prints are taken. They match the fingerprints which were found at the crime scene. Patrick blackmails Étienne, demanding 3 million Euros. Étienne cannot get the sum together. Subsequently, he decides to turn himself in.

== Cast ==
- Benoît Magimel as Étienne Meunier
- Julie Gayet as Clémence Meunier
- François-Xavier Demaison as Patrick Chambon
- Léa Seydoux as Fleur
- Stephane De Groodt as Kazinski
- André Wilms as François
- Dominique Labourier as Micheline
- Jo Deseure as Etienne
- Jean-Marie Winling as Maurice

== Reception ==
Iwan Pranowo of Movielogy.com evaluated Sans laisser de traces as a "nice surprise" but also belittled it as merely a French version of the film Match Point. Jordan Mintzer of Variety derided the film as "a paint-by-numbers tale of greed, betrayal and seduction" which was "marginally saved by first-rate acting and production values".

== DVD release ==
A French version with English subtitles was released by Mongrel Media in 2010.
