= Motherly (2009 film) =

- French: Maternelle
- Directed by: Philippe Blasband
- Written by: Philippe Blasband
- Produced by: Olivier Rausin
- Starring: Aylin Yay; Anne Girouard; Chloé Struvay
- Cinematography: Ella Van den Hove
- Edited by: Lenka Fillnerova
- Music by: André Dziezuk; Marc Mergen
- Release dates: August 2009 (Montréal World Film Festival); 15 September 2010 (Belgium)
- Running time: 83 minutes
- Country: Belgium
- Language: French

Motherly (French: Maternelle) is a 2009 Belgian comedy-drama film directed by Philippe Blasband. The film tells the story of Viviane, who after the death of her mother, gets visits from her ghost.

The film received two nominations at the 1st Magritte Awards.
