= Paths of Memory =

- Directed by: José Luis Peñafuerte
- Written by: José Luis Peñafuerte
- Produced by: Marion Hänsel; José María Lara
- Cinematography: Raymond Fromont
- Edited by: Sandrine Deegen
- Music by: Bingen Mendizábal
- Release dates: October 2009 (Valladolid International Film Festival); 14 April 2010
- Running time: 96 minutes
- Countries: Belgium; Spain
- Language: Spanish

Paths of Memory (Spanish: Los caminos de la memoria) is a 2009 documentary film directed by José Luis Peñafuerte. The film won the 2011 Magritte Award for Best Documentary Film.
