= Sister Smile (film) =

Soeur Sourire
- Film poster
- Directed by: Stijn Coninx
- Written by: Stijn Coninx; Ariane Fert; Chris Vander Stappen
- Produced by: Eric Heumann; Marc Sillam
- Starring: Cécile de France; Sandrine Blancke; Jan Decleir; Tsilla Chelton
- Cinematography: Yves Vandermeeren
- Edited by: Philippe Ravoet
- Music by: Bruno Fontaine
- Distributed by: Kinepolis Film Distribution (Belgium); Océan Film (France)
- Release date: 23 April 2009
- Running time: 120 minutes
- Countries: France; Belgium
- Language: French
- Budget: $7.3 million
- Box office: $2.9 million

Sister Smile (original title: Sœur Sourire) is a Belgian-French biographical drama film directed by Stijn Coninx and written by Coninx, Ariane Fert and Chris Vander Stappen. The film stars Cécile de France as Jeanne-Paule Marie Deckers, also known as "The Singing Nun". The film won the Magritte Award for Best Costume Design.

== Plot ==
In Belgium in the 1950s. Jeanne-Paule Marie Deckers dreams of becoming a singer and of going to Africa as a missionary. Against her family's wishes, she joins a convent. However, she rebels against the strict rules which have become too much for her, especially when her guitar is taken from her and when she hears that she'll have to wait several years before being sent to Africa for missionary work. Despite being punished, she is eventually given back her guitar so she can entertain young people visiting the convent. One day she is filmed by Belgian television while singing and playing music to a group of youngsters. This launches her career as a commercially successful artist, yet everything she earns is sent to the convent and the prioress keep her identity secret from the general public, while keeping her success secret from Deckers herself.

Later, Deckers discovers the truth and eventually gets fed up with obeying the other sisters. She leaves the convent and moves in with her friend Annie who had made a pass at her when they were younger but whom she rejected. Deckers desperately tries to get her career back on the road but she is told that she cannot use her stage name "Soeur Sourire" or "Singing Nun" because the convent owns the rights to it. She starts performing under her own name and goes on a tour in Québec, but due to her controversial song about birth control nobody wants to sign her anymore for concerts. Deckers is reduced to singing in small strip clubs and gets depressed. Rejected by both the convent and her own family, Deckers returns to Annie and falls in love.

Pursued by the Ministry of Finance of Belgium for taxes on her first album, which the Church didn't pay, she and Annie commit suicide together.

== Cast ==
- Cécile de France as Jeanne-Paule Marie Deckers
- Filip Peeters as Antoine Brusson
- Tsilla Chelton as oldest Dominican
- Sandrine Blancke as Annie
- Jan Decleir as Lucien Deckers
- Jo Deseure as Gabrielle Deckers
- Marie Kremer as Françoise
- Christelle Cornil as Sister Christine
- David Murgia as Louvain
- Eric Godon as The bailiff
