= Gabrielle Vincent =

Belgian illustrator and writer

- Born: Monique Martin; 9 September 1928; Brussels
- Died: 24 September 2000 (aged 72); Brussels
- Writing career
- Notable works: Ernest & Celestine

Monique Martin (alias Gabrielle Vincent; 9 September 1928 – 24 September 2000) was a Belgian writer and illustrator of children's books. She is most famous for the children's book series Ernest & Celestine.

== Biography ==
Monique Martin was born in Brussels on 9 September 1928, and died there on 24 September 2000. Her nom de plume is derived from the first names of her grandparents, Gabrielle and Vincent.

She worked as a painter, using watercolors as a medium, before beginning a career as an illustrator in the 1980s with the series Ernest et Célestine, which was adapted into an animated film in 2012.

== Works ==
- Un jour, un chien (1982)
- Brel : 24 portraits (1989)
- Carnet du désert (1992)
- La Petite Marionnette (1992)
- Lettre à une amie (1993)
- Papouli et Federico - Le Grand Arbre (1994)
- Papouli et Federico - A la mer (1994)
- Papouli et Federico - Dans la forêt (1994)
- Au bonheur des chats (1995)
- Je voudrais qu'on m'écoute (1995)
- Au bonheur des ours (1995)
- J'ai une lettre pour vous (1995)
- La Montgolfière (1996)
- Nabil (2004)
- Le Violoniste (2006)
- Désordre au paradis (2008)
