= Illegal (2010 film) =

2010 film

- Film poster
- Directed by: Olivier Masset-Depasse
- Written by: Olivier Masset-Depasse
- Produced by: Jacques-Henri Bronckart
- Starring: Anne Coesens; Alexandre Gontcharov
- Cinematography: Tommaso Fiorilli
- Edited by: Damien Keyeux
- Music by: André Dziezuk; Marc Mergen
- Release dates: 18 May 2010 (Cannes); 6 October 2010 (Belgium)
- Running time: 90 minutes
- Countries: Belgium; France; Luxembourg
- Language: French

Illegal (French: Illégal) is a 2010 Belgian drama film directed by Olivier Masset-Depasse. The film was selected as the Belgian entry for the Best Foreign Language Film at the 83rd Academy Awards, but it did not make the final shortlist. The film received eight nominations at the 1st Magritte Awards, winning Best Actress for Anne Coesens and Best Supporting Actress for Christelle Cornil. The film is critical of practices of Belgian immigration officers.

== Plot ==
The film follows Tania and her 13-year-old son Ivan, two illegal Russian aliens living in Belgium. After being denied Belgian permanent residence, Tania deliberately burns her fingers to remove her fingerprints and avoid identification. Tania advises her Belarusian friend Zina to apply for political asylum, since Belarus is considered a dictatorship by Belgians, but Zina seems to dismiss Tania's advice.

Tania is caught, but she tells Ivan to run. She refuses to tell her name, hoping to be released after 5 months, as she is told by another illegal. Ivan comes to live with Zina. Tania is eager to start working in the detention center to earn money to phone him from time to time. Ivan wants to start working to earn his living. However, Tania is worried that it will be criminal work. Ivan wants to visit her, but she does not want that, it could make things worse. Authorities threaten to put her in jail for two years for giving a false name when applying for medical insurance.

Desperate, Tania identifies as Zina and applies for political asylum, as a Belarusian. But then she is surprised to learn that Zina has already asked for asylum before, in Poland. Eventually Tania (as Zina) is forced into a plane to be deported to Poland. However, other passengers protest, and she is taken off the plane. After being beaten on her way back to the detention center, she awakens in a hospital, and manages to escape the sleeping guard, to finally reunite with her son Ivan.

== Cast ==
- Anne Coesens as Tania
- Alexandre Golntcharov as Ivan
- Christelle Cornil as Lieve
- Frédéric Frenay as Policier 1
- Esse Lawson as Aissa
- Olivier Schneider as Policier 2
- Shirley Rumierk as Maribel Chacon

== See also ==
- List of submissions to the 83rd Academy Awards for Best Foreign Language Film
- List of Belgian submissions for the Academy Award for Best Foreign Language Film
