= Stéphane Aubier =

Belgian film director and screenwriter

- Born: 8 October 1964 (age 61)
- Occupations: Film director, screenwriter

Stéphane Aubier (born 8 October 1964) is a Belgian film director and screenwriter. In 2009, he wrote and directed the animated film A Town Called Panic along with Vincent Patar. It premiered at the 2009 Cannes Film Festival and was the first stop-motion film to be screened at the festival. In 2013, he co-directed with Patar and Benjamin Renner the film Ernest & Celestine, which received widespread critical acclaim. The film received three Magritte Awards, including Best Film and Best Director for Aubier and Patar. It also received a nomination at the 86th Academy Awards, in the category of Best Animated Feature.
