= Vincent Patar =

Belgian film director and screenwriter (born 1965)

Vincent Patar (born 2 September 1965) is a Belgian film director and screenwriter. In 2009 he wrote and directed the animated film A Town Called Panic along with Stéphane Aubier. It premiered at the 2009 Cannes Film Festival and was the first stop-motion film to be screened at the festival. In 2013 he co-directed with Aubier and Benjamin Renner the film Ernest & Celestine, which received widespread critical acclaim. The film received three Magritte Awards, including Best Film and Best Director for Patar and Aubier. It also received a nomination at the 86th Academy Awards, in the category of Best Animated Feature.
