= Olivier Masset-Depasse =

Belgian film director and screenwriter

Olivier Masset-Depasse is a Belgian film director and screenwriter. He made his feature-length debut in 2006 with Cages. In 2010, he wrote and directed Illegal, which premiered at the 2010 Cannes Film Festival and was nominated for eight Magritte Awards. It was selected as the Belgian entry for the Best Foreign Language Film at the 83rd Academy Awards. His next film was Mothers' Instinct starring Veerle Baetens, Anne Coesens and Mehdi Nebbou, which premiered at the 2018 Toronto International Film Festival. It received ten nominations at the 10th Magritte Awards, winning in nine categories, including Best Film and Best Director for Masset-Depasse, holding the record for the most Magritte Awards won by a single film.
