= Mylène Jampanoï =

French actress (born 1980)

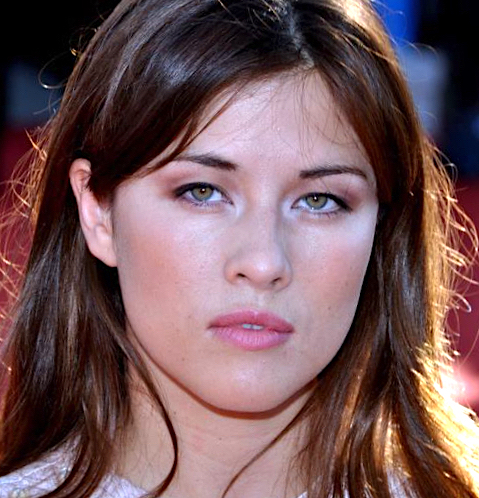
- Jampanoï at the 2012 Deauville American Film Festival
- Born: Lena Jam-Panoï; 12 July 1980 (age 46); Aix-en-Provence, France
- Occupations: Actress; model; painter
- Years active: 2002–present
- Spouse: Milind Soman (m. 2006; div. 2009)
- Children: 1

Mylène Jampanoï (French pronunciation: [milɛn ʒɑ̃panɔj]; born Lena Jam-Panoï; 12 July 1980) is a French actress, model, and visual artist. Her first leading role was in the drama film The Chinese Botanist's Daughters (2006). She subsequently garnered international attention for her role in Pascal Laugier's controversial horror film Martyrs (2008).

She later had a supporting role in Clint Eastwood's Hereafter (2010), and starred as Bambou in the Serge Gainsbourg biopic, Gainsbourg: A Heroic Life (also 2010). Other film credits include the American animated film Kung Fu Panda (2008), the Canadian drama Laurence Anyways (2012), and the Netflix-produced Madame Claude (2021).

In addition to her acting and modeling career, Jampanoï is a painter whose works have been exhibited at Paris's Galerie Sobering.

== Early life ==
Mylène Jampanoï was born Lena Jam-Panoï on 12 July 1980 in Aix-en-Provence, Bouches-du-Rhône, France, to a Chinese father and a French-Breton mother. Her father, who immigrated to France from China through Vietnam, abandoned the family when she was three years old, and later established a prosperous textile business in Canada.

Jampanoï was raised by her mother, who worked as a cashier at the food retailer Rallye. As a teenager, Jampanoï fled her family home due to her mother's severe depression, and lived with her boyfriend in a Paris squat. She eventually returned to her family home in Aix-en-Provence to complete her education, earning a scientific baccalauréat at age 17. While still a teenager, she was taken under the wing of a 35-year-old male attorney in Aix-en-Provence, who became her mentor. After she earned her baccalauréat, he urged her to pursue a career in law, but she instead relocated again to Paris to pursue acting and modeling.

== Career ==
After appearing in the French television series Sous le soleil, Jampanoï had a minor part in the action thriller Crimson Rivers II: Angels of the Apocalypse (2004), followed by a supporting role in 36th Precinct (also 2004), a crime thriller starring Daniel Auteuil and Gérard Depardieu. She was then cast in the independent drama film Valley of Flowers (2006). Next, Jampanoï starred in the drama The Chinese Botanist's Daughters (2006), a role which necessitated her to phonetically learn Chinese. In 2007, she became the face of Dior Snow cosmetics in Asia for LVMH and travelled to Japan and South Korea to represent the brand. She subsequently appeared on the cover of Asian Elle magazine.

Jampanoï gained international attention for her role in Pascal Laugier's controversial horror film Martyrs (2008), which was filmed in Montreal. Jampanoï took the role against the advice of her agent, and later stated that making the film was emotionally difficult due to its extreme content: "Every night when I went back to my room, I just cried, because I was so physically and psychologically tired. All my scenes [were] violent." Also in 2008, she had a minor voice role in the American animated comedy film Kung Fu Panda as Maître Vipère. Next, she appeared in the French mockumentary film The Ball of Actresses (2009), directed by Maïwenn, and in 2010, had a supporting role in Clint Eastwood's drama Hereafter, playing a news reporter. The same year, she starred in the Serge Gainsbourg biopic Gainsbourg: A Heroic Life, portraying actress Bambou.

In 2017, Jampanoï guest-starred on the Apple TV-UK series Kill Skills, and reprised her role in the film sequel of the series, Kill Skills 2 (2018). She subsequently had a central role in Made in China (2019), a comedy film about a French-Chinese family preparing for a wedding, directed by Julien Abraham. She then had a supporting role in the Netflix-released Madame Claude (2021), a biopic about French brothel owner Madame Claude.

In addition to acting, Jampanoï is also a visual artist, whose paintings were exhibited in the spring of 2022 at the Paris Galerie Sobering, as part of the Athènes n'est pas en Grèce (lit. English: Athens is not in Greece) show.

== Personal life ==
Jampanoï married Indian supermodel and actor Milind Soman in Goa in 2006. They met during the shooting of their film Valley of Flowers. The two divorced in 2009.

In the summer of 2014, she gave birth to a son, Andrèas Vassily, with her longtime partner, Greek producer Dimitri Stephanides.

Jampanoï is a Roman Catholic, and was baptised in the church in 2015, though she has expressed criticism of the church's clerical celibacy policies. She also stated her support of the legalization of same-sex marriage in France.

== Filmography ==
=== Film ===
Year	Title	Role	Notes	Ref.
2004	Crimson Rivers II: Angels of the Apocalypse	Pénélope		
2004	36th Precinct	Jade	French: 36 Quai des Orfèvres	
2005	Cavalcade	Soraya		
2005	Le Détective : Contre-enquête	Angèle	Television film; as Lena Jam-Panoï	
2006	The Chinese Botanist's Daughters	Min Li	French: Les Filles du botaniste	
2006	Valley of Flowers	Ushna	French: La Vallée des fleurs	
2006	Pleure en silence	Kristina		
2008	Choisir d'aimer	Julie		
2008	Martyrs	Lucie		
2008	Kung Fu Panda	Maître Vipère	Voice role	
2009	The Ball of the Actresses	Herself	French: Le Bal des actrices	
2010	Gainsbourg: A Heroic Life	Bambou	French: Serge Gainsbourg, vie héroïque	
2010	The Skin of Sorrow	Fedora	Television film	
2010	Hereafter	Jasmine		
2012	Laurence Anyways	Fanny		
2012	The Maneater	Jezabel		
2014	La Mante religieuse	Jézabel		
2018	Kill Skills 2	Julia	Television film	
2019	Made in China	Lisa		
2021	Madame Claude	Yoshiro		
2021	Undercover	Mylène Antoine		

=== Television ===
Year	Title	Role	Notes	Ref.
2002	Sous le soleil	Laeticia Valanski	Television series	
2011	Rani	Jolanne de Valcourt	Television miniseries	
2014	H-Man	La Main Verte	1 episode	
2017	Addict	Déborah	6 episodes	
2017	Kill Skills	Julia	1 episode	
2022	Addict	Déborah	6 episodes	
