= Makoto Koji =

Japanese illustrator, animator, and voice actress (born 1987)

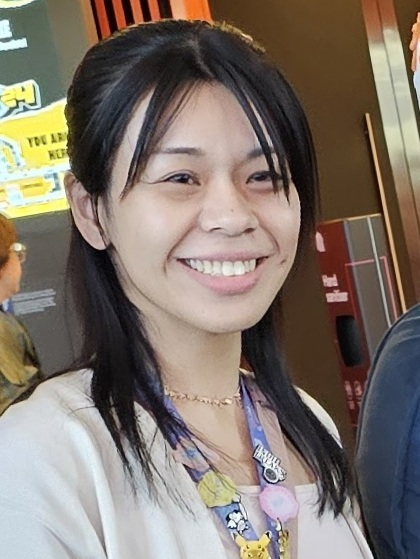
- Koji at PAX Australia 2024
- Born: 7 March 1987 (age 39); Hiroshima, Japan
- Education: Griffith University
- Occupations: Illustrator; animator; voice actress
- Years active: 2009–present
- Partner: Ari Gibson

Makoto Koji (Japanese: 小路真琴, Hepburn: Koji Makoto; born 7 March 1987) is a Japanese illustrator, animator, and voice actress. She voiced Hornet, a major character in Australian studio Team Cherry's video game Hollow Knight (2017), and the protagonist of Hollow Knight: Silksong (2025).

== Early life and education ==
Makoto Koji was born in Hiroshima, Japan, on 7 March 1987.

She moved to Goomeri, Queensland, Australia, when she was three and grew up there. She became interested in animation due to her family watching Japanese cartoons on VHS. Koji graduated from Griffith University with a Bachelor of Animation, 3D Animation and Film in 2007.

== Career ==
In her final year of university, Koji traveled to Adelaide for work experience with The People's Republic of Animation. After graduating, she began working for them, where she worked on animations such as the award-winning The Cat Piano (2009), which Ari Gibson also worked on. After working with several other animation studios, she went freelance and formed Paper Rabbits in 2011, as she felt "many of the jobs had masculine subject matter and themes", but she "wanted to make animation and tell stories from a female perspective". Paper Rabbits' first directed animation was "Ko-Oni (Little Troll)" (2013). In 2016, its sci-fi comedy "animated anthology following young space-faring women" Cosmica received funding by Screen Australia's Gender Matters initiative.

During the development of Team Cherry's Hollow Knight (2017), Koji began voice acting for the character Hornet. Initially, that role was planned to go to a friend of hers, but once Koji learned that her friend was going to move overseas, she offered to voice-act herself. Koji, not a trained voice actress, explained in an interview with The Verge that she "did a lot of making up [her] own gibberish" while voice acting, and used made-up words that felt "instinctual". In addition to Hornet, Koji voice acted other characters. She reprised her role as Hornet in Hollow Knight: Silksong (2025), completing voicework by March 2022. Her performance as Hornet, especially in Silksong, has been praised, with Matt Patches of Polygon praising its showcase of emotion, and The Washington Post's Gene Park lauding its showcase of confidence and strength.

Koji worked on the German-Australian film Maya the Bee: The Honey Games (2018). She has done illustration work, such as being the illustrator for Katrina Nannestad's Lottie Perkins book series (2019-2020), and Liz Ledden's Everyone Wants an Octopus Book (2024), described by The Guardian as having "vibrant illustrations [which make] important themes of representation fun".

== Personal life ==
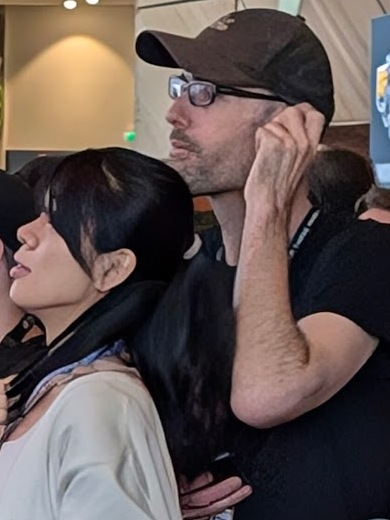
Koji with Ari Gibson, 2024

Koji has been in a relationship with Team Cherry co-founder Ari Gibson since 2007. As of 2018, she shares her office with Team Cherry.
