= Eddie White (director) =

Australian writer

Edward Alexander White, known as Eddie White, is an Australian writer/director and co-founder of The People's Republic Of Animation. His short animated film The Cat Piano (2009) won an Australian Film Institute (AFI) Award for Short Animation, and was also shortlisted for an Academy Award for Best Short Animated Film in 2010.

== Early life and education ==
Edward Alexander White was born in Adelaide, South Australia.

He graduated from the Flinders University Drama Centre where he majored in Drama Performance.

== Career ==
White was a co-founder of The People's Republic Of Animation in 2003, with James Calvert, Hugh Nguyen, Brodie McCrossin, and Sam White.

White made his directorial debut in 2003, writing and directing his first animated music video The Bomb (Sixxx Legs) for Triple J unearthed band The Fuzz. He followed up in 2005 writing and co-directing his first short film, Fritz Gets Rich. He created and directed the short series Errorism: a comedy of terrors an animation that centred on a hopeless terrorist in a Betty Boop style landscape. In 2006 he wrote Carnivore Reflux which he co-directed with James Calvert.

The film was a Tropfest finalist. In 2007, he made his solo directorial debut on a short film called Sweet & Sour, a co-production with China's Shanghai Animation Film Studio.

White co-directed a short film called The Cat Piano with art director/animator Ari Gibson of The PRA. The short film is narrated by Nick Cave. It was awarded the Dendy Award for Best Short Animation at the 2009 Sydney Film Festival, the Best Short Animation award at the Melbourne International Film Festival 2009, and won both the IF and AFI awards for best short animation. It was on the list of ten short animations shortlisted for a nomination for the 82nd Academy Awards.

In 2011, he left The People's Republic Of Animation who were moving into the video game and Short Form TV series market, to further pursue filmmaking, including branching out into live action.

In 2011, he co-directed the animation for a music video (specifically for live concerts) for the track "Easy Way Out" for Australian musical outfit Gotye with Benjamin Drake. He was writing and developing a never-developed animated feature-length film with Ari Gibson as well as several live action features.

His live action short film Upside Down Feeling was developed by the Adelaide Film Festival Fund in 2015.

== Filmography ==
White's short films include:

- Fritz Gets Rich (2005)
- Carnivore Reflux (2006)
- Sweet & Sour (2007)
- The Cat Piano (2009)
- Upside Down Feeling (2015)
