= Benjamin Speed =

Australian musician

- Also known as: Mister Speed, Mister Benjamin Speed, Mr Tappin' Fresh
- Born: Benjamin Peter Speed; Adelaide, South Australia, Australia
- Genres: Film music, trip hop, Indie pop, hip hop, lo-fi, electronica, alternative, experimental
- Occupations: Film composer, songwriter, record producer
- Instruments: Guitar, bass, vocals
- Years active: 2000–present
- Labels: Creative Vibes, Groovescooter, ABC
- Formerly of: The New Pollutants
- Website: www.benjaminspeed.com

Benjamin Peter Speed is an Australian musician, producer, and composer. He previously performed and recorded as Mister Speed, Mr Speed, and more recently as Mister Benjamin Speed. He was vocalist and songwriter in the Australian alternative, electronic, and hip hop duo The New Pollutants, along with producer and musician DJ Tr!p. They performed live at many festivals and as support acts, and also released music. They were best known for their Metropolis Rescore, a new soundtrack to Fritz Lang's famous silent film Metropolis. Speed has composed many other scores for film and television, for which he has won awards.

== Early life and education ==
Benjamin Peter Speed was born in Adelaide, South Australia. He says that he was "named by [his] brother and sister after Beatrix Potter's books The Tale of Benjamin Bunny and The Tale of Peter Rabbit.

His parents were separated when he was a child. Living with his mother, he grew up without television, meat, or junk food. He spent every second weekend at his father's house, and he enjoyed listening to his father's music, which included Michael Jackson's Thriller and Dire Straits' Brothers in Arms. He learnt to play classical guitar at school, playing in the school orchestra and then the high school band, which played grunge music, including covers of Nirvana songs, as well as other rock classics. Late in high school he started making electronic music, inspired by crossover hip hop bands, such as Rage Against the Machine, Beastie Boys, and later DJ Shadow.

Speed attended university to study music. He graduated with a music technology honours degree from the Elder Conservatorium (part of the University of Adelaide) in 2004. He moved to Sydney in 2006, where he attended the Australian Film, Television and Radio School (AFTRS), graduating with a Graduate Diploma: Film and Television – Screen Composition in 2008.

== The New Pollutants ==
Speed formed The New Pollutants in 2001 with Australian musician Tyson Hopprich (DJ Tr!p). "DJ Trip", according to Hopprich, "arrived in about year 10". By 2002 he had released several tracks, including "Vinyl Perplexa", "Recyclise", "Recyclise Reinterpreted", and an EP, Rock the beat (EP). In 2002 he was DJ'ing on Wednesday and Thursday nights at the Crown & Anchor Hotel.

Their sound traversed through a number of different genres, including lo-fi, trip hop, electro, Commodore 64 music, 1950s and 1960s pop, comedy, alternative hip hop, and electronica. Rachel Paterson wrote in RealTime Arts in 2003: "The New Pollutants are intellectual hip-hop with an experimental edge. These guys have their own sound, it's global and it's local and it has evolved from who these artists are... The live experience integrates visual experiments with original sound and a theatrical, interactive edge".

=== Hygene Atoms ===
The New Pollutants released Hygene Atoms in 2002. The duo were compared to Buck 65, Tricky, and DJ Shadow after the release of Hygene Atoms.

=== "Sid-Hop" and Urban Professional Nightmares ===
In July 2003 the New Pollutants released the 7" single "Sid-Hop".

Using tracks recorded between 2002 and 2004, in July 2004 they released Urban Professional Nightmares as a Twelve-inch single. They released the EP at the Minke Bar in Adelaide. It included four tracks from Hygene atoms on one side, and five new tracks on the other (which were released as a digital download in April 2004). The music was created using lo-fi technology, including a Commodore 64 SID chip.

=== Metropolis Rescore ===
In 2005 The New Pollutants composed and produced Metropolis Rescore, a new soundtrack to Fritz Lang's famous silent film Metropolis, which they premiered live at the 2005 Adelaide Film Festival and other music and film festivals, including the 2006 Edinburgh International Film Festival. ACMI described the soundtrack as "an infectious and unique approach ranging from Germanic trip hop and lo-fi electronica to unforgettable classical and breathtaking cinematica".

In 2011, a newly updated score was composed to the 2010 restoration version, which has an extra 30 minutes of footage originally thought lost.

On 7 March 2021, the film was screened with The New Pollutants performing their re-score live at Federation Square in Melbourne, presented by Insite Arts.

=== Live performances ===
In September 2001, The New Pollutants played Electrofringe: Independent Electronic Labels Conference 2001 in Newcastle, playing alongside Anticon, Mad Professor, and others. In the following month, they supported Anticon on part of their Australian tour.

The New Pollutants' favourite live venues in 2002 were Mojo West, Skylab at Minke, the Rhino Room, and the Crown and Sceptre Hotel in Adelaide city centre. In 2003, they played at the University of Adelaide O'Ball.

The New Pollutants were headliners of the 2004 Adelaide Fringe Festival opening concert. They also played at Australian music festivals, including in the Boiler Room at Big Day Out in 2003, along with Kraftwerk and others and the Falls Festival (2004 New Year's Eve). Overseas they played at the TINA Festival (2001 and 2002); Anticon, and Scalene (2002).

They played a show called 2002AD at the 2002 Adelaide Fringe. Also in 2002, the band played as support act for DJ Dexter (The Avalanches), and in 2003, played in Sydney at The Herd's album launch as well as supporting UK act The Herbaliser. They played support for Buck 65 in 2004, and for Japanese DJ DJ Krush, Canadian DJ Kid Koala, Australian hip hop group Combat Wombat, and American rapper Kool Keith in 2005.

=== Recognition and awards ===
Sydney's 3D World magazine named their single "CD release of the week" for September 2002. Their tracks were included in albums on labels such as Surgery Records, ABC, LaTrobe, and Semikazi.

They won the DB Magazine Reader Award for Most Popular Dance Act in 2003, and DJ Tr!p won Most Popular DJ in 2003 and 2004.

In 2004, The New Pollutants won the Most Popular Electronic / Dance Act award at the South Australian Music Industry Awards (SAMI or SAMIA).

They were a Top 15 finalist in the Ninja Tune/Big Dada/UKHH.com remix competition, with more than 300 entries from around the world.

They gained national airplay on JJJ as well as local stations 2SER (Sydney), 4ZZZ (Brisbane), 3RRR (Melbourne), Three D Radio (Adelaide), RTR (Perth). They earned number 1 spot on Three D's "Top 20 + 1" in June 2003, for "Sid-Hop".

=== Winding up ===
The New Pollutants did not release any more music or perform live beyond their re-score of Metropolis, but did perform together live once more, at an open-air screening of the film in March 2021 in Melbourne,

In 2016 Speed said that although touring and performing live was a lot of fun, but he could not do it for the rest of his life as there was so much physical effort involved, and he would be exhausted and often injured after each performance. The Metropolis re-score was Speed's first attempt at composing music rather than songwriting.

== Solo career ==
His first name as an artist was Mr Tappin' Fresh (the Hip Hop Antihero), and under this name he released an EP, Music for Mass Consumption. He also used the name The Other Half.

=== Mister (Benjamin) Speed ===
After adopting the stage name of Mr Speed (the Veritable Half-Breed), he released an album called Mr Speed Presents: The Other Half Of Humanity on 1 October 2001.

During his time as part of The New Pollutants, Speed also released some songs on his Myspace page, described as following "a skewed and slightly surreal geeky hip-hop aesthetic". These songs were noticed by Australian independent record label Creative Vibes, leading to a record deal for a solo album. In 2007, Speed released his debut solo album The Dreamer, as Mr Speed, which was critically acclaimed. The Sydney Morning Herald described it thus:"The opening sounds like a scene from The Godfather; it closes with a hybrid of hip-hop rock. In between there are snippets of 1950s French soundtracks, moody trip-hop and multiple samples. The vocals sway between Beck and Buck 65, moving from the philosophy of art to observations of love". Chris Downton noted in Cyclic Defrost: The Dreamer appears primed to take his compositions and productions to a new audience considerably broader than those previously familiar with his work as one half of The New Pollutants. Particular apparent upon even an initial listen is the diversity of musical touchstones and influences that have gone into its creation, with everything from Central European folk instrumentation ("You Should Be Dancing") to 1950s-styled rock n' roll ("Ready For Action") / skiffle and jazz-tinged dub ("Can't Get Home") rearing its head over the album's fourteen track running length". The style is more eclectic than Speed's previous work with The New Pollutants, and Speed described the album as "1950s laptop hip-pop". He also said that he had "wanted to emphasise the idea of 'oneness' and I particularly wanted to be both musically and lyrically more positive" [than in The New Pollutants' music].

In 2014, as Mister Benjamin Speed, three tracks were featured on Triple J Unearthed: "Hello goodbye"; "Shhh... You had me at death"; and "Ballad of the last used man". They wrote that he sounds like American producer and musician Meco.

=== Film and TV ===
Speed's first film score was written and performed as part of The New Pollutants, the March 2005 Metropolis Rescore for the Adelaide Film Festival. Also in 2005, Speed began composing other film scores and collaborated with The People's Republic of Animation. His first screen score was for the comedy TV series Errorism: A Comedy of Terrors (2005).

Also for The People's Republic of Animation, he wrote the score for the animated short film Carnivore Reflux (2006).

In 2008, Speed composed the score for the feature documentary film A Northern Town, which won an AFI Award.

In 2009, he composed the music for The Cat Piano, directed by Eddie White and Ari Gibson, and narrated by Nick Cave, which was shortlisted for the 2010 Academy Awards and won numerous other awards. In the same year, he composed the score for the short film Street Angel, based on the comic of the same name.

In 2010 he won an APRA/AGSC Award for his work on the series Itty Bitty Ditties.

Speed has also worked with Closer Productions on their films and television series. In 2013 he composed the music for Sundance and Berlin Film Festival award-winning film 52 Tuesdays directed by Sophie Hyde, In 2016 he said that had been his best "pinch yourself" moment so far. He also composed the music for Closer's TV series The Hunting, and Aftertaste, for which he was nominated for best score at the 12th AACTA Awards.

Speed composed for the feature documentaries The Snowman in 2010, which won the Australian Documentary Prize and was nominated for an AFI Award. and Embrace (2016).

In 2019, he worked with Leigh Marsh to compose the film score for Zane Roach's short film 37 Things (released 2020).

In 2022, Speed composed and played "Monos Lithos" as the film score for the scifi thriller from Monolith, which one reviewer called "pitch perfect" for the film, and was praised by several others. In 2023, Speed composed the score for the film The Portable Door starring Christoph Waltz and Sam Neill. It won Feature Film Score of the Year at the 2023 Screen Music Awards, in which his "Monos Lithos" from Monolith was also nominated, for Best Original Song Composed for the Screen.

He also composed the scores for Miss Nikki and the Tiger Girls (2012); In My Blood It Runs (2019); A Game of Three Halves (2020); This Is Port Adelaide (2021); Good Luck to You, Leo Grande (2022); Embrace Kids (2022); The Defenders (2023); and Make It Look Real (2024).

=== Inspiration ===
Speed said in 2014 that his dreams had often inspired his music as well as guiding his life choices. He said that he mainly composed scores, songs, and sounds to accompany visual media, but thinks of it "as making music for inspiration".

== Other activities ==
While living in Adelaide, Speed was working as a music teacher, for which he won a South Australian Award for Excellence in Arts Education.

In Sydney, he taught film composition at AFTRS.

== Personal life ==
Speed married Spanish film producer Blanca Lista in 2012. They met in 2011 when Speed was living in Sydney but on holiday in Los Angeles. She visited Sydney in 2012, and a few days later he flew to LA. They were married a week later by an Elvis impersonator in Las Vegas, with Speed returning soon afterwards for work in Sydney. Speed was granted visa to live in the US in August 2014. As of March 2021 they were living in LA with their son, with Speed flying back to Australia regularly for work.

== Awards and nominations ==
=== APRA Music Awards ===
The APRA Music Awards are sets of annual awards to celebrate excellence in contemporary music, which honour the skills of member composers, songwriters and publishers who have achieved outstanding success in sales and airplay performance. They are presented by APRA AMCOS (Australasian Performing Right Association and Australasian Mechanical Copyright Owners Society), which commenced in 1982. The related annual Screen Music Awards were first presented in 2002 by APRA AMCOS and the Australian Guild of Screen Composers (AGSC).

Year	Nominee / work	Award	Result	Ref.
2009	The Cat Piano (Benjamin Speed)	Best Music for a Short Film	Nominated	
2010	Itty Bitty Ditties (Thomas Bettany, Speed)	Best Music for Children's Television	Won	
2010	The Snowman (Speed)	Best Music for a Documentary	Nominated	
2014	Time Tremors – Series 1	Best Music for Children's Television	Nominated	
2023	The Portable Door (Speed)	Feature Film Score of the Year	Won	
2023	"Monos Lithos" from Monolith	Best Original Song Composed for the Screen	Nominated	
2025	Eat The Invaders	Best Music for Unscripted & Reality Television Series	Won	

=== Other awards and nominations ===
- ?: South Australian Award for Excellence in Arts Education
- 2006: Best Original Score, St Kilda Film Festival, for Carnivore Reflux
- 2020: Co-winner, with Leigh Marsh, Best Music Composition at the South Australian Screen Awards, for 37 Things

== See also ==
- List of Australian composers
- List of people from Adelaide
