= Ash Stymest =

English model, actor and musician

- Born: Ashley Stymest; 31 July 1991 (age 35); England
- Education: Ravens Wood School
- Occupations: Model; actor; singer; songwriter
- Years active: 2008–present
- Modelling information
- Height: 5 ft 11 in (1.80 m)
- Hair colour: Dark brown
- Eye colour: Blue
- Agency: Curtis Brown Group; Rocketfuel Entertainment
- Musical career
- Genre: Alternative rock
- Instrument: drums/vocals
- Labels: Interscope Records; Universal International

Ashley Stymest (born 31 July 1991), better known by Ash Stymest, is an English male model, actor and musician.

== Career ==
Stymest was brought up in Coney Hall. He attended first Charles Darwin School, and then Ravens Wood School, in London Borough of Bromley. His modelling career started after being recruited by Hedi Slimane in 2008. He was scouted while skateboarding through the streets of Camden when he was sixteen. That same year, he was photographed by Slimane for the cover of Japanese Vogue Hommes, his first appearance on a magazine cover.

Stymest has appeared on the cover of international magazines and various fashion shows. He has worked with famous fashion designers, such as John Galliano, Karl Lagerfeld, Jeremy Scott, Hedi Slimane, and Alexander McQueen among others. He has appeared in the campaigns for Moschino, Chanel, Topman, H&M, Karl Lagerfeld, and more. He had his portrait painted by film director and painter Gus Van Sant.

From 2010 to 2011, Stymest presented a show on MTV UK called MTV Bang. Stymest started playing music since he was 12 and he was a member of the group of Mannequins, but later founded his own band BonesUK, where he played the drums. He also started to write music for other artists. In 2011, Stymest recorded an album with his band. In 2014, Stymest was featured in the Korean girl group, 2NE1's music video, "Gotta Be You".

In 2015, Stymest signed with modelling agency The Lions NY. He was next managed by production and management company for directors, writers, actors and comedians Anonymous Content as well as by the Curtis Brown Group. Later on, Stymest discovered model Simone "Slick Wood" Thompson and helped launch her fashion career.

Stymest next starred opposite Hafsia Herzi, in a French independent film Sex Doll (Amoureux Solitaires), directed by Sylvie Verheyde. The film was released in December 2016.

In December 2018, Stymest signed a record deal with Interscope Records North America and Universal International with his first EP set to be released in 2019. In April 2019, he signed with a Malaysian artist agency Rocketfuel Entertainment who will be handling his music career in the Asian region.

== Filmography ==
=== Film ===
Year	Title	Role	Notes	Ref.
2016	Sex Doll	Rupert	Debut role	

=== Music video appearances ===
Year	Title	Artist	Ref.
2014	"Gotta Be You"	2NE1	

=== Variety show ===
Year	Title	Role	Network
2010–2011	MTV Bang	Host	MTV UK

== Discography ==
=== Digital single ===
Year	Title	Note
2011	Red Lips	with his band Bones
