= Morgan Baker =

Australian actor

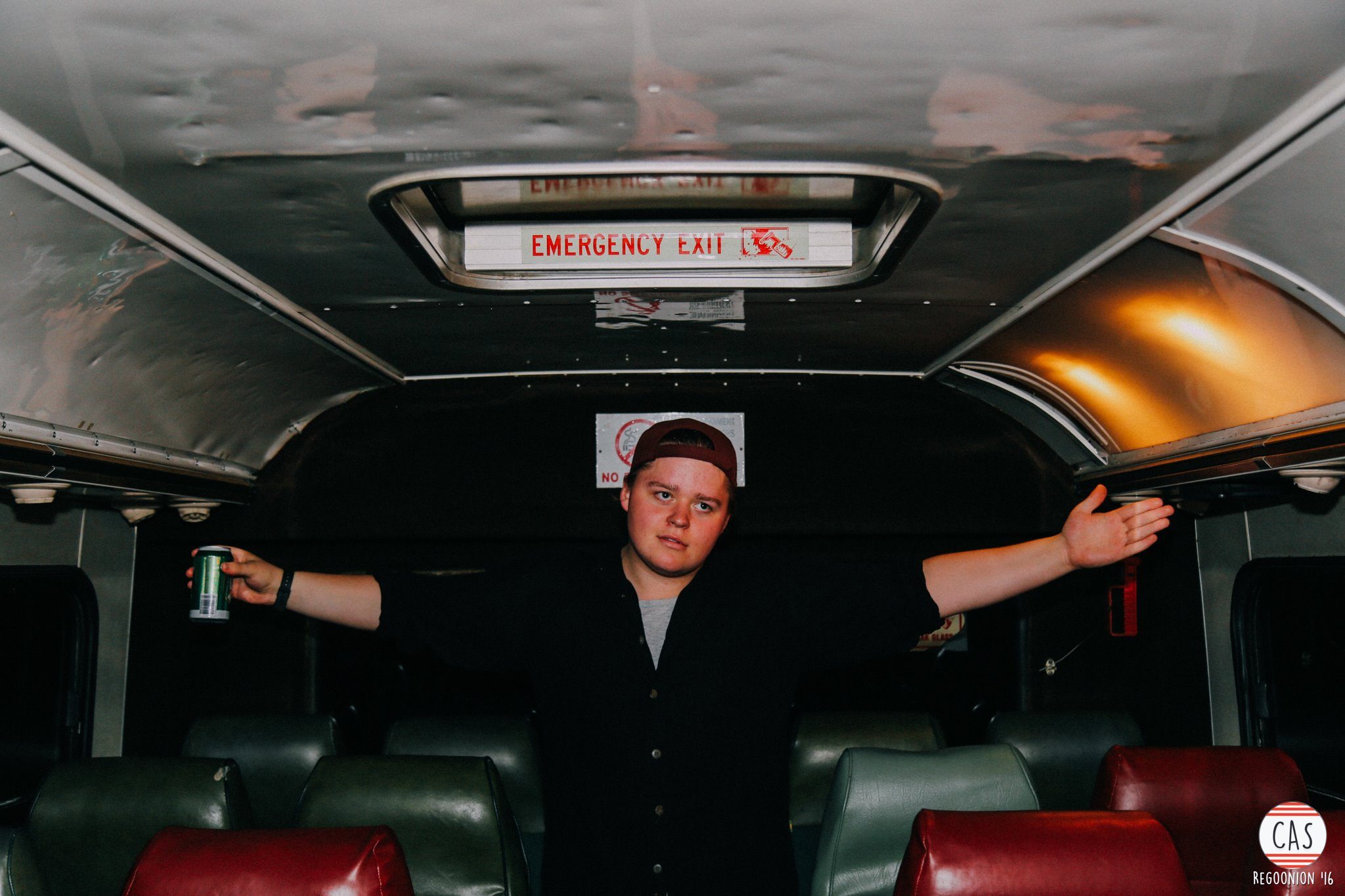
- Born: Morgan Baker; 11 May 1997 (age 29); Melbourne, Australia
- Occupation: Actor
- Years active: 2006–present
- Known for: Neighbours (2008–2023)

Morgan Baker (born 11 May 1997) is an Australian actor best known for playing the role of Callum Jones on the soap opera Neighbours between 2008 and 2014. He briefly reprised the role of Callum in 2015, 2017, 2019, 2022, and 2023.

== Early life ==
Baker has appeared in TV adverts since he was in kindergarten. During primary school, he took keyboard lessons.

== Career ==
Baker has appeared in several TV movies including The Society Murders, Underbelly and The King. He also starred in the 2006 Tropfest Film Festival top 16 finalist Goggles.

In 2014, Baker left Neighbours to concentrate on his studies. He has since made brief returns in 2015, 2017 and 2019. He again reprised the role for the Neighbours “finale” in 2022, and also returned in 2023 for the opening episodes of the series revival.

A keen chef, Baker has said that if he doesn't succeed in acting he would like to appear on Ready Steady Cook. In light of this, he temporarily produced a cooking series documented on Snapchat titled Shake and Bake with Morgan Baker, that ran from 2014 to 2015, before experiencing a hiatus and returning in 2016. The theme song was composed by musician Oliver Ryan.

In July 2018, Baker appeared as the Generation Z guest competitor in season 5 of game show Talkin' 'Bout Your Generation.

== Filmography ==
=== Film ===
Year	Title	Role	Notes
2006	Goggles	Billy	Short film
2006	The Society Murders	Family member	TV movie
2007	The King	David	TV movie
2007	Underbelly	Dylan James	TV movie

=== Television ===
Year	Title	Role	Notes
2008–2023	Neighbours	Callum Jones / Callum Rebecchi	TV series, 1118 episodes
2014–2015, 2016	Shake and Bake with Morgan Baker	Host	Snapchat series
2015	Sammy J & Randy in Ricketts Lane	Zydrunas	TV series, season 1, episode 1: "The Postman"
2017	Neighbours: Pipe Up	Callum Rebecchi	Miniseries, 2 episodes
2017	Neighbours vs. Time Travel	Callum Rebecchi	Miniseries, 2 episodes
2018	Talkin' 'Bout Your Generation	Gen Z contestant	TV series, season 5, episode 7
