= Madame Claude (film) =

2021 film directed by Sylvie Verheyde

- Promotional poster
- Directed by: Sylvie Verheyde
- Screenplay by: Sylvie Verheyde
- Produced by: Florence Gastaud
- Starring: Karole Rocher
- Cinematography: Léo Hinstin
- Edited by: Christel Dewynter
- Distributed by: Netflix
- Release date: 2 April 2021
- Country: France
- Language: French

Madame Claude is a 2021 biographical film created and released by Netflix about the infamous French brothel-keeper Madame Claude.

== Plot ==
Madame Claude is the owner of a popular brothel in the late 1960s Paris, and has knowledge that gives her incredible power and influence over French politicians and underworld figures. The arrival of an affluent and well-connected young woman threatens to undermine everything.

== Cast ==
- Karole Rocher as Madame Claude
- Garance Marillier as Sidonie
- Roschdy Zem as Jo Attia
- Pierre Deladonchamps as Serge
- Liah O'Prey as Virginie
- Paul Hamy as André
- Mylène Jampanoï as Yoshiro
- Hafsia Herzi as Nadège
- Regina Anikiy as Geneviève
- Annabelle Belmondo as Kate
- Joséphine de La Baume as Josie
- Gina Jimenez as Anne
- Samir Guesmi as René la Canne
- Benjamin Biolay as The inspector

== Production ==
The film is directed by Sylvie Verheyde.

== Release ==
The film premiered globally on Netflix on 2 April 2021.

== Reception ==
On the review aggregator website Rotten Tomatoes, 20% of five critics' reviews are positive, with an average rating of 4.60/10.
