= Karole Rocher =

French actress (born 1974)

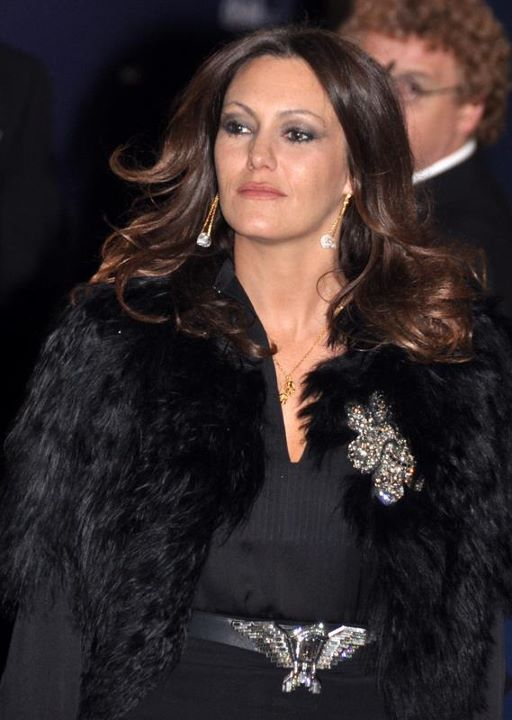
- Karole Rocher at the 37th César Awards, 2012
- Born: 4 July 1974 (age 50); Bezons, Val-d'Oise, France
- Occupation: Actress
- Years active: 1997–present
- Children: Barbara (3 August 1996); Gina (2002)
- Website: karolerocher.fr

Karole Rocher (born 4 July 1974) is a French actress best known for her role as Roxane Delgado in the French TV series Braquo.

== Life and career ==
Karole Rocher grew up in Sartrouville, outside Paris, with her father and spent her summers with her mother in a village in Corsica. At 16 she worked nights as a waitress until she was noticed by the entourage of Princess Erika. It was in 1995 that Karole Rocher began her acting career alongside Romain Duris appearing in a music video of Princess Erika directed by Olivier Dahan for the song Faut qu’j'travaille. In 1997 she met director Sylvie Verheyde, she made her film debut playing the role of Virgine in Un frère. In 1998 she was then given her first lead role in the Rachid Bouchareb directed movie L'Honneur de ma famille with Roschdy Zem. She worked alongside Roschdy Zem again in the 2000 film Sauve-moi. She then went on to continue working with Sylvie Verheyde in Princesses in 2000, Amour de Femme in 2001, Scorpion in 2007, Stella in 2008 and Confession of a Child of the Century in 2011. In 2009 she landed a leading role in police TV series Braquo written and directed by Olivier Marchal as Lieutenant Roxane Delgado with Jean-Hugues Anglade, Nicolas Duvauchelle and Joseph Malerba. In the 2011 film Poliss she played the role Chrys for which she was nominated for a César Award for Best Actress in a Supporting Role.

== Personal life ==
At the age of 19, she met a boy of 7 called Thierno, who was neglected by his parents. She took him in and raised him as her own son. Today, Thierno is a fashion stylist and photographer. Karole is also the mother of two daughters from different fathers, Barbara, born in 1996, and Gina who was born in 2002. Karole is close friend to the actors Nicolas Duvauchelle, whom she met on the set of the series Braquo, and JoeyStarr, who met her during Le bal des actrices and Polisse. She's married to Thomas Ngijol, a French-Cameroonian actor, with whom she has two daughters.

== Filmography ==
=== Film ===
Year	Title	Role	Notes
1997	Un frère	Virgine	
1998	L'honneur de ma famille	Karole	
2000	Sauve-moi	Cécile	
2000	Princesses	Virginie	
2001	Forever After	Annie Collins	
2001	Amour de Femme	Eloïse	
2001	Comment j'ai tué mon père	Laetitia	English: How I Killed My Father
2003	Osmosis	La vendeuse de vêtements	
2003	Adieu	Servanne	
2007	Scorpion	Virginie	
2008	Stella	Roselyne	
2009	Le bal des actrices	Karole Rocher	English: The Ball of the Actresses
2010	Bus Palladium	Françoise	
2011	Les yeux de sa mère	Sylvie, l'éditrice	
2011	Polisse	Chrys	Nominated: César Award for Best Supporting Actress 2012
2011	The Snows of Kilimanjaro	La mère de Christophe	
2011	Last Screening	La mère de Sylvain	
2012	Confession of a Child of the Century	Marco	
2013	Les Anonymes	Jeanne Ferrandi	
2013	Tip Top	Virginie Benamar	
2014	Les Yeux jaunes des crocodiles	Josiane Lambert	
2014	Fast Life		
2021	Madame Claude	Madame Claude	

=== Television ===
Year	Title	Role	Notes
2009	Suite noire	Valérie	1 Episode
2009-2011	Braquo	Roxane Delgado	16 Episodes
2010	Histoires de vies	Catherine	1 Episode
2011	Le grand journal de Canal+	Herself	1 Episode
2012	La nuit des Césars	Herself	1 Episode

2019 - Black Snake: La légende du serpent noir Françoise Lanclos
