= 2009 Adelaide Film Festival =

- Opening film: My Year Without Sex
- Closing film: Easy Virtue
- Location: Adelaide, Australia
- Founded: 2002
- Awards: International Award for Best Feature Film (Treeless Mountain); Don Dunstan Award (Jan Chapman)
- Directors: Katrina Sedgwick
- No. of films: 13 (In Competition)
- Festival date: 19 February – 1 March 2009
- Website: adelaidefilmfestival.org

The 4th Adelaide Film Festival took place in Adelaide, Australia, from 19 February to 1 March 2009. Katrina Sedgwick was again Festival Director. Jan Chapman received the 2009 Don Dunstan Award The poster this year depicts the iconic film festival eye character concept that was so successful in 2007.

The festival opened with My Year Without Sex directed by Sarah Watt and closed with Easy Virtue directed by Stephan Elliott. The festival presented 23 world premieres, 62 Australian premieres, 38 Australian films, 9 new Australian features from established and emerging filmmakers, and 143 films from over 49 countries. The Natuzzi International Award for Best Feature Film was won by the South Korean film Treeless Mountain, directed and written by So Yong Kim.

== Competition ==
=== Jury ===
The following people were selected for the In Competition Jury:

- Laurence Kardish, Canadian, Senior Film Curator at MoMA (President)
- J. M. Coetzee, South African writer
- Jo Dyer, Australian film producer
- Bill Gosden, director of the New Zealand International Film Festival
- Naomi Kawase, Japanese film director
- Hannah McGill, artistic director of the Edinburgh International Film Festival
- David Stratton, English-Australian film critic

=== In Competition ===
The following films were selected for the In Competition section:

English title	Original title	Director(s)	Production country/countries
A Christmas Tale	Un conte de Noël	Arnaud Desplechin	France
All Around Us	Gururi no koto?	Ryōsuke Hashiguchi	Japan
Dean Spanley	Dean Spanley	Toa Fraser	UK/New Zealand
Gomorrah	Gomorra	Matteo Garrone	Italy
Jalainur	Zha lai nuo er	Ye Chao	China
Kisses	Kisses	Lance Daly	Ireland/Sweden
My Tehran for Sale	تهران من، حراج	Granaz Moussavi	Australia/Iran
My Year Without Sex	My Year Without Sex	Sarah Watt	Australia
Stella	Stella	Sylvie Verheyde	France
The Sky, the Earth and the Rain	El cielo, la tierra y la lluvia	José Luis Torres Leiva	Chile/France/ Germany
Teza	Teza	Haile Gerima	Ethiopia/Germany/ France
Treeless Mountain	Namueopneun San	So Yong Kim	USA/South Korea
Zift	Dzift	Javor Gardev	Bulgaria

== Awards ==
The Natuzzi International Award for Best Feature Film

The Natuzzi International Award for Best Feature Film was won by the South Korean film Treeless Mountain, directed and written by So Yong Kim.

Audience Award

The Audience Award for Best Feature was won by Samson & Delilah.

The Audience Award for Best Documentary was won by Kiran Bedi.

The Audience Award for Best Short was won by The Cat Piano.

Don Dunstan Award

The Don Dunstan Award was won by Jan Chapman.
