= Sex Doll =

2016 film by Sylvie Verheyde

- Directed by: Sylvie Verheyde
- Screenplay by: Sylvie Verheyde
- Produced by: Bruno Berthemy; Bertrand Faivre; Soledad Gatti-Pascual
- Release date: 7 December 2016 (France)
- Running time: 102 minutes
- Countries: United Kingdom; France
- Languages: English; French

Sex Doll is a 2016 drama thriller film, directed by Sylvie Verheyde, and produced by Bruno Berthemy, Bertrand Faivre, and Soledad Gatti-Pascual. The film stars Hafsia Herzi, Ash Stymest, and Karole Rocher in the lead roles.

== Plot ==
Rupert struggles to rescue Virginie from a French escort. Virginie lives a double life, pretending to be a real estate agent with her family and an escort in reality. Rupert befriends her but has an agenda of his own. He is hired by family members of minors who are recruited by Virginie's boss. At an escort session gone wrong, Virginie's young colleague gets clobbered by clients. Virginie rescues her, and Rupert helps them escape. Unfortunately, the relationship between Virginie and her boss sours. Virginie leaves, and Rupert joins her on the train.

== Cast ==
- Hafsia Herzi as Virginie
- Ash Stymest as Rupert
- Karole Rocher as Raphäelle
- Paul Hamy as Cook
- Marlon Blue as Nat

== Reception ==
=== Critical response ===
On the review aggregator Rotten Tomatoes, the film holds an approval rating of 0% based on five reviews. Metacritic, which uses a weighted average, assigned the film a score of 44 out of 100, based on 4 critics, indicating "Mixed or average reviews".

Frank Scheck of The Hollywood Reporter wrote, "A high-rent prostitute becomes romantically involved with a man harboring a secret in Sylvie Verheyde's erotic thriller."Decider wrote, "Writer/Director Sylvie Verheyde's Sex Doll is neither sexy, nor dolly (whatever that means)." Gary Goldstein of The Los Angeles Times wrote, "Tighter pacing, more dimensional and compelling characters, and twistier consequences could have helped better propel this dark, semi-intriguing tale."
