= Metropolis Rescore =

Soundtrack album by The New Pollutants
- Released: March 2005
- Recorded: June 2004 – January 2005
- Genre: Film music, orchestral, electronica
- Length: 118 minutes
- Producer: Benjamin Speed & Tyson Hopprich

The New Pollutants chronology
Urban Professional Nightmares (2004)	Metropolis Rescore (2005)

Metropolis Rescore is a soundtrack by Australian musical duo The New Pollutants, written as a score for the silent film Metropolis and released in 2005. The live performance also featured singer Astrid Pill as vocalist and musician Zoe Barry as cellist.

== Release and live performances ==
=== Original (2005) ===
The original version of the soundtrack for Metropolis by The New Pollutants was for the 118-minute, digitally-restored version which was released in 2002 by the F. W. Murnau Foundation and Kino International.

In 2004 The New Pollutants composed and produced the new soundtrack, and premiered it at the 2005 Adelaide Film Festival. The live performance featured actor/singer Astrid Pill as vocalist, musician Zoe Barry as cellist, DJ Tr!p on turntables and beats, and Benjamin Speed on computer, samples, and fx.

Metropolis was subsequently performed at the Australian Centre for the Moving Image (ACMI) in 2008; as a part of the 2006 Commonwealth Games Cultural Festival; and at the 2006 Revelation Perth International Film Festival.

In 2010 the work was performed as part of Concrete Playground at the Sydney Opera House, and in 2011 it was performed at Mona Foma, programmed by Brian Ritchie.

=== Re-score (2011) ===
In 2011, they remade the soundtrack to match the new 2010 restoration of the film, performing live at the Piccadilly Cinema in North Adelaide as part of the 2011 Adelaide Film Festival in March 2011, to good reviews. This version was released as a digital download on 12 December 2013.

=== Live performance ===
On 7 March 2021, the film was screened with The New Pollutants performing their re-score live at Federation Square in Melbourne, presented by Insite Arts.

== Reception ==
The soundtrack has been described as "an infectious and unique approach ranging from Germanic trip hop and lo-fi electronica to unforgettable classical and breathtaking cinematica".

== Track listing ==
1. Metropolis Theme [Opening Titles]
2. Shift Change
3. Running Race / Eternal Garden
4. Maria’s Love Theme [Part 1]
5. Moloch
6. Joh Frederson’s Theme
7. Workers Theme [Part 1]
8. Rotwang's Theme / Futura’s Theme [Creation]
9. Workers Theme [Part 2]
10. The Catacombs [Part 1]
11. The Catacombs [Part 2] / The Tower Of Babel
12. The Catacombs [Part 3]
13. Maria’s Love Theme [Part 2] / Prelude To Kidnap
14. Kidnap Theme [Part 1]
15. The Seven Deadly Sins
16. Kidnap Theme [Part 2]
17. Futura’s Theme [Transformation]
18. Yoshiwara / The Seven Deadly Sins [Reprise]
19. Corruption Theme
20. The Destruction Of Metropolis [The Heart Machine]
21. The Destruction Of Metropolis [The Flood]
22. Witch Hunt
23. Metropolis Theme [Closing Titles]
