= Françoise Fabian =

French actress

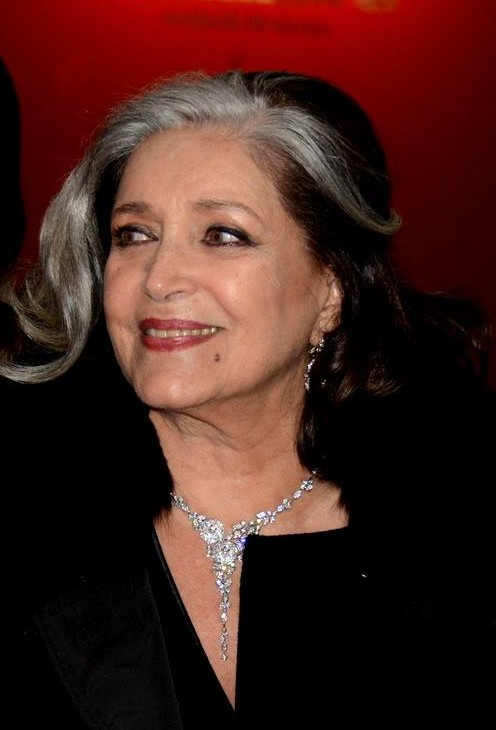
- Fabian in 2014
- Born: Michelle Cortès; 10 May 1933 (age 93); Algiers, French Algeria
- Citizenship: France
- Occupation: Actress
- Years active: 1956–present
- Spouses: Jacques Becker (m. 1958; died 1960) Marcel Bozzuffi (m. 1963; died 1988)

Michelle Cortès (born 10 May 1933), known professionally as Françoise Fabian (French: [fʁɑ̃swaz fabjɑ̃]), is a French film actress. She has appeared in more than 100 films since 1956. In 1971, Fabian signed the Manifesto of the 343, publicly declaring having had an abortion.

== Filmography ==
Year	Title	Role	Director	Notes
1956	Mémoires d'un flic	The Countess	Pierre Foucaud; André Hunebelle	Debut film
1956	Naughty Girl	Lili Rocher-Villedieu	Michel Boisrond	
1956	Fernandel the Dressmaker	Sophie	Jean Boyer	
1956	Les Aventures de Till L'Espiègle	Esperanza	Gérard Philipe; Joris Ivens	
1956	Michel Strogoff	Natko	Carmine Gallone	
1957	Burning Fuse	Lola Wassevitch	Henri Decoin	
1957	Ce sacré Amédée	Elia Tarti / Cigale	Louis Félix	
1957	L'aventurière des Champs-Élysées	Josette Darcanges	Roger Blanc	
1957	A Bomb for a Dictator	Mme. Lambert	Alex Joffé	
1957	The Violent	Evelyne Tiercelin	Henri Calef	
1958	Every Day Has Its Secret	Hélène Lezcano	Claude Boissol	
1960	L'histoire dépasse la fiction	Catherine de l'Isle Bouchard	Jean Kerchbron	TV series (1 episode)
1960	La brune que voilà	Christine	Robert Lamoureux	
1962	Una domenica d'estate		Giulio Petroni	
1962	Sentimental Education		Alexandre Astruc	
1962	L'inspecteur Leclerc enquête	Mme Gauthier	Claude Barma	TV series (1 episode)
1963	The Magnificent Adventurer	Lucrezia	Riccardo Freda	
1963	Maigret Sees Red	Lily	Gilles Grangier	
1964	La caméra explore le temps	Mata Hari	Guy Lessertisseur	TV series (1 episode)
1965	Version grecque	Maira	Jean-Paul Sassy	TV movie
1965	Les Cinq Dernières Minutes	Évelyne Sommières	Claude Loursais	TV series (1 episode)
1965	Morgane ou Le prétendant	Lady Hamilton	Alain Boudet	TV movie
1965	La jeune morte	The Stepsister	Claude Faraldo; Roger Pigaut	
1966	Le train bleu s'arrête 13 fois	Simone	Serge Friedman	TV series (1 episode)
1967	The Thief of Paris	Ida	Louis Malle	
1967	Belle de Jour	Charlotte	Luis Buñuel	
1967	Marion Delorme	Marion Delorme	Jean Kerchbron	TV movie
1969	My Night at Maud's	Maud	Éric Rohmer	Nominated - National Society of Film Critics Award for Best Actress; Nominated - New York Film Critics Circle Award for Best Supporting Actress
1969	Gli specialisti	Virginia Pollywood	Sergio Corbucci	
1969	L'américain	Women agency	Marcel Bozzuffi	
1970	The Cop	Hélène Dassa	Yves Boisset	
1970	The Females	Astrid	Zbyněk Brynych	
1971	Raphael, or The Debauched One	Aurore	Michel Deville	
1971	Êtes-vous fiancée à un marin grec ou à un pilote de ligne?	Marion Blanchard	Jean Aurel	
1971	Out 1	Lucie	Jacques Rivette; Suzanne Schiffman	
1972	Love in the Afternoon	Dream Sequence	Éric Rohmer	
1972	Black Turin	Lucia Rao	Carlo Lizzani	
1973	Au rendez-vous de la mort joyeuse	Françoise	Juan Luis Buñuel	
1973	Les voraces	Lara	Sergio Gobbi	
1973	Sentimental Education	Marie Arnoux	Marcel Cravenne	TV Mini-Series
1973	Happy New Year	Françoise	Claude Lelouch	David di Donatello - For her performance San Sebastián International Film Festival for Best Actress
1973	Projection privée	Marthe / Eva	François Leterrier	
1973	Hail the Artist	Peggy	Yves Robert	
1974	Out 1: Spectre	Lucie	Jacques Rivette	
1974	City Under Siege	Cristina Cournier	Romolo Guerrieri	
1974	To Love Ophelia	Federica	Flavio Mogherini	
1975	How to Kill a Judge	Antonia Traini	Damiano Damiani	
1975	Down the Ancient Staircase	Anna Bersani	Mauro Bolognini	
1976	Al piacere di rivederla	Viviana Bonfigli	Marco Leto	
1976	Natale in casa d'appuntamento	Nira	Armando Nannuzzi	
1976	Chi dice donna, dice donna	Bella / Lulù	Tonino Cervi	
1977	The French Woman	Madame Claude	Just Jaeckin	
1977	The Blue Ferns	Monika Berthier	Françoise Sagan	
1979	Cinéma 16	Hélène	Nina Companeez	TV series (1 episode)
1979	Les dames de la côte	Clara Decourt	Nina Companeez	TV movie
1980	Le mandarin	Sylvie Chaput	Patrick Jamain	TV movie
1981	Tovaritch	Tatiana Ouratief	Jeannette Hubert	TV movie
1982	Un fait d'hiver	Lisa	Jean Chapot	TV movie
1982	Deux heures moins le quart avant Jésus-Christ	Laetitia	Jean Yanne	
1983	Archipel des amours	The Friend	Jean-Claude Guiguet	
1983	La veuve rouge	Marie Reinart	Édouard Molinaro	TV movie
1983	Bon anniversaire Juliette	Elsa	Marcel Bozzuffi	TV movie
1983	Le cercle des passions	Renata Strauss	Claude d'Anna	
1983	Benvenuta	Jeanne	André Delvaux	
1983	L'ami de Vincent	Dominique	Pierre Granier-Deferre	
1985	Quo Vadis?	Pomponia	Franco Rossi	TV Mini-Series
1985	Partir, revenir	Sarah Lerner	Claude Lelouch	
1986	Faubourg St Martin	The Marquise	Jean-Claude Guiguet	
1988	Les clients	Marie-France	Yannick Andréi	TV movie
1988	Trois places pour le 26	Marie-Hélène de Lambert	Jacques Demy	Nominated - César Award for Best Supporting Actress
1989	Haute tension	The Black	Jacques Ertaud	TV series (1 episode)
1989	Reunion	Countess von Lohenburg	Jerry Schatzberg	
1989	Disperatamente Giulia		Enrico Maria Salerno	TV movie
1989	Renseignements généraux	Monette	Claude Barma	TV series (1 episode)
1991	Plaisir d'amour	Do	Nelly Kaplan	
1991	Reflections in a Dark Sky	Valeria	Salvatore Maira	
1992	Pour une fille en rouge	Rose	Marianne Lamour	
1993	Un commissario a Roma	Renata Amidei	Luca Manfredi; Ignazio Agosta; Roberto Giannarelli	TV series (10 episodes)
1993	Donne in un giorno di festa	Francesca	Salvatore Maira	
1996	Un chantage en or	Florence Valette	Hugues de Laugardière	TV movie
1996	La comète	Agathe	Claude Santelli	TV movie
1998	Top Secret	Geneviève	Jacques Rivette	
1999	The Letter	Mme de Chartres	Manoel de Oliveira	
1999	Season's Beatings	Yvette	Danièle Thompson	
2000	Champollion, un scribe pour l'Égypte	Voice-over	Jean-Claude Lubtchansky	Documentary film
2002	La chanson du maçon	Elena	Nina Companeez	TV movie
2003	Le nouveau testament	Lucie Marcelin	Yves Di Tullio; Bernard Murat	TV movie
2004	5x2	Monique	François Ozon	
2005	La femme coquelicot	Marthe	Jérôme Foulon	TV movie
2006	Mademoiselle Gigi	Aunt Alicia	Caroline Huppert	TV movie
2008	Made in Italy	Rosa	Stéphane Giusti	
2008	LOL (Laughing Out Loud)	Anne's mother	Lisa Azuelos	
2009	A Man and His Dog	Achab's wife	Francis Huster	
2009	Rapt	Marjorie	Lucas Belvaux	
2010	L'Arbre et la forêt	Marianne Muller	Olivier Ducastel; Jacques Martineau	
2010	Small World	Elvira Senn	Bruno Chiche	
2010	Comme les cinq doigts de la main	Suzie Hayoun	Alexandre Arcady	
2011	Le grand restaurant II	The mother of the heterosexual	Gérard Pullicino	TV movie
2012	What's in a Name?	Françoise	Alexandre de La Patellière; Matthieu Delaporte	
2013	Me, Myself and Mum	Babou	Guillaume Gallienne	Nominated - César Award for Best Supporting Actress
2013	Les Petits Meurtres d'Agatha Christie	Alexina Laurence	Marc Angelo	TV series (1 episode)
2014	Post partum	Carmen	Delphine Noels	
2015	Call My Agent!	Herself	Antoine Garceau	TV series (1 episode)
2018	Brillantissime	Claire	Michèle Laroque	
