= Confession of a Child of the Century =

2012 film

- French theatrical release poster
- French: Confession d'un enfant du siècle
- Directed by: Sylvie Verheyde
- Screenplay by: Sylvie Verheyde
- Based on: The Confession of a Child of the Century by Alfred de Musset
- Produced by: Bruno Berthemy
- Starring: Charlotte Gainsbourg; Peter Doherty; August Diehl; Lily Cole; Volker Bruch; Guillaume Gallienne; Karole Rocher; Rhian Rees; Joséphine de La Baume
- Cinematography: Nicolas Gaurin
- Edited by: Christel Dewynter
- Music by: Nousdeux the Band
- Production companies: Les Films du Veyrier; Integral Films; Warp Films; Rhône-Alpes Cinéma; Arte France Cinéma
- Distributed by: Ad Vitam Distribution (France); Farbfilm Verleih (Germany); Soda Pictures (United Kingdom)
- Release dates: 20 May 2012 (Cannes); 29 August 2012 (France); 7 December 2012 (United Kingdom); 20 June 2013 (Germany)
- Running time: 125 minutes
- Countries: France; Germany; United Kingdom
- Language: English
- Budget: $4.3 million
- Box office: $184,016

Confession of a Child of the Century (French: Confession d'un enfant du siècle) is a 2012 historical drama film written and directed by Sylvie Verheyde, based on Alfred de Musset's 1836 autobiographical novel of the same name. The film competed in the Un Certain Regard section of the 2012 Cannes Film Festival. In spite of its selection to the festival, the film gained notoriety as being the lowest-grossing US theatrical release of 2015; it earned US$74 from its one-week, one-theater theatrical run.

== Cast ==
- Charlotte Gainsbourg as Brigitte
- Pete Doherty as Octave
- Lily Cole as Elise
- August Diehl as Desgenais
- Volker Bruch as Henri Smith
- Joséphine de La Baume as Desgenais's mistress
- Guillaume Gallienne as Mercanson
- Rebecca Jameson as voice over
- Effi Rabsilber as Cantatrice
- Rhian Rees as Madame Levasseur
- Karole Rocher as Marco

== Production ==
Pete Doherty, who worked primarily as a musician, was obsessed with Charlotte Gainsbourg because of the legacy surrounding her famous father, French musician Serge Gainsbourg. During press for the film, he alleged that he and Gainsbourg had had a fling after filming and she had briefly abandoned her partner Yvan Attal and moved from Paris to London in order to be with him.
