= Scorpion (2007 film) =

2007 French film drama directed by Julien Seri

- Directed by: Julien Seri
- Written by: Cédric Jimenez; Sylvie Verheyde; Julien Seri
- Produced by: Cédric Jimenez; Jean Labadie; Julien Seri
- Starring: Clovis Cornillac
- Cinematography: Michel Taburiaux
- Edited by: Virginie Bruant; Richard Riffaud
- Music by: Christian Henson
- Distributed by: BAC Films
- Release date: 21 February 2007
- Running time: 98 minutes
- Country: France
- Language: French
- Budget: $4.8 million
- Box office: $1.5 million

Scorpion is a 2007 French action drama film directed by Julien Seri.

== Plot ==
Angelo is a former street fighter who can't deny his troubled past. Yet he has learned to channel his aggressions by striving for success in Muai Thai. But during a tournament, the officials do him wrong. After an unjustified disqualification, he cannot hide his contempt for his opponent. Although this seals the premature end of his career, the worst is still about to come, because he has made an enemy. The aforementioned opponent believes he ought to teach Angelo a lesson. He and his friends confront Angelo outside the tournament.

When three enemies attempt together to waste Angelo in a derelict, dark alley, his instincts kick in. Driven by wrath, he applies his acquired fighting skills without restraint. Thus he causes the death of one of these men. Since he seems to have fought them off with considerable ease, a court judges that this wasn't self-defense but manslaughter. Angelo is sentenced to prison.

After he has done his time, Angelo struggles mentally, an issue made worse by his alcoholism. Despite this fact, a woman recognises a spark of decency in him. As a result, Angelo becomes encouraged to start over once again. But he was unable to get any other job than to engage in illegal fights where gangsters bet on him. In order to survive these fights, Angelo had to give every effort possible.

== Cast ==
- Clovis Cornillac as Angelo
- Francis Renaud as Marcus
- Karole Rocher as Virginie
- Caroline Proust as Léa
- Jérôme Le Banner as Elias
- Olivier Marchal as De Boers
- Philippe Bas as Patrick

== Reception ==
Critics assert that this film is different from most films about martial arts because it refrains from idealised, aesthetic fight choreography.

== Background ==
Scorpion was the film debut of international martial arts champion Jérôme Le Banner.

== See also ==
- Lionheart
- Fighting
