= The French Woman =

1977 film

- French film poster
- Directed by: Just Jaeckin
- Written by: André G. Brunelin; Jacques Quoirez
- Produced by: Claire Duval
- Starring: Françoise Fabian
- Cinematography: Robert Fraisse
- Edited by: Marie-Sophie Dubus
- Music by: Serge Gainsbourg
- Release date: 8 September 1977
- Running time: 105 minutes
- Country: France
- Language: French
- Box office: $8.6 million

The French Woman (French: Madame Claude) is a 1977 French drama film directed by Just Jaeckin and starring Françoise Fabian. The film is inspired by the life of French brothel madam Madame Claude.

== Cast ==
- Françoise Fabian as Madame Claude
- Dayle Haddon as Elizabeth
- Murray Head as David Evans
- Klaus Kinski as Alexander Zakis
- Vibeke Knudsen as Anne-Marie
- Maurice Ronet as Pierre
- Robert Webber as Howard
- Jean Gaven as Gustave Lucas
- André Falcon as Paul
- François Perrot as Lefevre
- Marc Michel as Hugo
- Roland Bertin as Soulier
- Ed Bishop as Smith
- Karl Held as Stanfield
