= Un amour de femme =

2001 film by Sylvie Verheyde

Amour de Femme
- Film cover.
- Directed by: Sylvie Verheyde
- Screenplay by: Sylvie Verheyde
- Produced by: Hervé Chabalier; Claude Chelli; Sylvie Verheyde
- Starring: Hélène Fillières; Raffaëla Anderson; Anthony Delon
- Cinematography: Pierre-William Glenn; Philippe Vene
- Edited by: Sabine Emiliani
- Music by: Frédéric Way
- Production company: Capa Drama
- Distributed by: M6 Métropole Télévision; Antiprod; Picture This! Entertainment
- Release date: 2001
- Running time: 89 minutes
- Country: France
- Language: French

Un amour de femme (A Woman’s Love), from the series Combats de femme, is a 2001 French film directed by Sylvie Verheyde about Jeanne, a married woman who has an affair with a female dance instructor named Marie.

== Synopsis ==
Jeanne (Hélène Fillières) a successful osteopath has been married to David (Anthony Delon) for 8 years and they have a son together Louis (William Wayolle). One evening, whilst reluctantly accompany her husband David to a party hosted for his friend Franck (Jeannick Gravelines), Jeanne meets Franck's cousin, a dance instructor named Marie (Raffaëla Anderson). Jeanne and Marie quickly become friends, bonding over their love for dance, something which Jeanne had given up 10 years ago. As Jeanne and David prepare to leave the party, Marie invites Jeanne to attend her dance classes.

Initially excited to start dancing again, Jeanne becomes disheartened when her old dancing gear doesn't fit her like it used to and she is also unable to keep up with the rest of the class. Marie decides to cheer Jeanne up by taking her to the ocean for the weekend with her little brother Moïse (Thierno Sy). After walking along to beach together and then going dancing, they check into a hotel were Jeanne and Marie share a room. Both being unable to sleep, Jeanne gives Marie a massage but stops after she begins to get turned on. In the morning Jeanne, still confused about her feelings the night before, decides to take the train home early, leaving Marie and Moïse to enjoy the weekend together. However, before boarding the train, Jeanne and Marie kiss.

Jeanne, faced with decisions about her sexual orientation, consults her friend Eloïse (Karole Rocher), telling her she thinks she is a lesbian and in love with Marie. Eloïse reacts negatively calling it disgusting and tells Jeanne she should not see Marie again. Despite this, Jeanne and Marie continue to meet up and after class one day, when David is away, she goes to eat dinner at Marie's house. After arriving at Marie's house, the relationship becomes physical and they have sex for the first time. Three weeks later Jeanne meets with her friend Eloïse again, this time she is slightly more understanding but still wishes she would stop meeting with Marie.

Back home, David asks Jeanne why she has been so distant recently. Unable to continue lying to him, she writes 'I'm in love with Marie' on a piece of paper and hands it to him. David becomes angry and, after a heated argument, he leaves to stay with Franck for a while. The next morning, Franck meets with Marie and tells her to stay away from Jeanne and David. David then goes to meet Jeanne and tells her to stop seeing Marie or he won't let her see her son Louis. Afraid of losing her son, Jeanne cuts contact with Marie and returns to David.

With Marie no longer around, Jeanne and David's relationship becomes worse as they constantly fight. Jeanne is heartbroken and becomes depressed to the point where her son Louis says she is no longer fun to be around. At night David gets dressed up in lingerie as an insult to Jeanne, telling her it is what she wants and they begin fighting once more. Jeanne decides she has had enough and in the morning she takes Louis to stay at her mother's (Roselyne Delpuech). After contacting her lawyer, Jeanne goes to see Marie. The film ends with Jeanne and Marie walking along the beach together.

== Cast ==
- Hélène Fillières as Jeanne
- Raffaëla Anderson as Marie
- Anthony Delon as David
- Jeannick Gravelines as Franck
- William Wayolle as Louis
- Karole Rocher as Eloïse
- Thierno Sy as Moïse
- Roselyne Delpuech as Jeanne's Mother
