= Trash Yéyé =

Studio album by Benjamin Biolay
- Released: 10 September 2007
- Genre: French pop
- Label: Virgin

Benjamin Biolay chronology
À l'origine (2004)	Trash Yéyé (2007)

Professional ratings
Review scores
Source	Rating
The Times	4/5 stars

Trash Yéyé is an album by French pop artist Benjamin Biolay. It was released on Virgin Records in 2007.

== Track listing ==
1. "Bien Avant "
2. "Douloureux Dedans "
3. "Regarder La Lumière"
4. "Dans Ta Bouche "
5. "Dans La Merco Benz"
6. "La Garçonnière "
7. "La Chambre D'Amis"
8. "Qu'est-ce Que Ça Peut Faire "
9. "Cactus Concerto"
10. "Rendez-Vous Qui Sait"
11. "Laisse Aboyer Les Chiens"
12. "De Beaux Souvenirs"
