= Caroline Paulus =

French actress, fashion model and singer (born 1959)

Caroline von Paulus
- Born: 1 March 1959 (age 67); Villeneuve-sur-Lot, France
- Occupations: Actress; fashion model; singer
- Partner(s): Serge Gainsbourg (c. 1980; d. 1991)
- Children: 1

Caroline von Paulus (born 1 March 1959) is a French actress, fashion model and singer, better known by her stage name Bambou. She was the partner of the French singer Serge Gainsbourg from 1981 until his death in 1991. Their son Lucien 'Lulu' Gainsbourg was born in 1986.

== Biography ==
Paulus started her career in 1979 with the film called Enfant secret, L. Other films and TV series that she appeared in were L'Homme sandwich, La Fin de la nuit, and 74 km avec elle.

Her father was a nephew of German World War II General Friedrich Paulus and born in Vietnam.

Paulus met Gainsbourg in 1980 at L'Elysée Montmartre in Paris and was the subject of his photobook Bambou et les poupées.

== In popular culture ==
Paulus was a fixture in the music and fashion scene during much of the 1980s. She was portrayed by actress Mylène Jampanoï in the film Gainsbourg (Vie héroïque).
