= Gainsbourg: A Heroic Life =

2010 film by Joann Sfar

- Promotional poster
- Directed by: Joann Sfar
- Written by: Joann Sfar
- Produced by: Marc du Pontavice; Didier Lupfer
- Starring: Eric Elmosnino; Lucy Gordon; Laetitia Casta; Doug Jones; Mylène Jampanoï; Anna Mouglalis; Yolande Moreau; Sara Forestier; Philippe Katerine; Claude Chabrol
- Cinematography: Guillaume Schiffman
- Edited by: Maryline Monthieux
- Music by: Olivier Daviaud
- Distributed by: Universal Pictures International
- Release date: 20 January 2010 (France)
- Running time: 130 minutes
- Country: France
- Language: French
- Budget: €16 million
- Box office: $12.2 million

Gainsbourg: A Heroic Life (original title: Gainsbourg (Vie héroïque)) is a 2010 French drama film written and directed by Joann Sfar. It is a biopic of French singer Serge Gainsbourg.

== Plot ==
The film follows notorious musician Serge Gainsbourg's exploits from his upbringing in Nazi occupied France through his rise to fame and love affairs with Juliette Gréco, Brigitte Bardot and Jane Birkin to his later experimentation with reggae in Jamaica. It also incorporates multiple elements of fantasy, most significantly with the character called "The Mug", an animated exaggeration of Gainsbourg that acts as his conscience (or anti-conscience) at crucial moments in Gainsbourg's life. The film also includes many of Gainsbourg's more famous songs, which serve as the soundtrack to the film and often serve as plot elements themselves.

== Cast ==
- Eric Elmosnino as Serge Gainsbourg
- Lucy Gordon as Jane Birkin
- Laetitia Casta as Brigitte Bardot
- Doug Jones as La Gueule (Gainsbourg's mug)
- Deborah Grall as Lise Levitzky
- Mylène Jampanoï as Bambou (Caroline von Paulus)
- Anna Mouglalis as Juliette Gréco
- Yolande Moreau as Fréhel
- Sara Forestier as France Gall
- Philippe Katerine as Boris Vian
- Philippe Duquesne as Lucky Sarcelles
- Grégory Gadebois as Phyphy
- François Morel as The Boarding's Director
- Claude Chabrol as Gainsbourg's Music Producer
- Ophélia Kolb as The Model
- Kacey Mottet Klein as young Serge Gainsbourg (Lucien Ginsburg)
- Marc du Pontavice as Police Officer Vian 1

=== Notes ===
- Lucy Gordon committed suicide while the film was in post-production, and it is dedicated to her.
- It was the first job for the daughter of producer Marc du Pontavice, Lou du Pontavice, who worked as a script intern at age 17.

== Critical response ==
On review aggregator Rotten Tomatoes 73% of 78 critics gave the film a positive review, with an average rating of 6.2/10. The site's consensus reads, "It might be thinly written and messily made, but Gainsbourg: A Heroic Life is also appropriately glamorous and intense -- and powerfully led by a gripping performance from Erik Elmosnino.". Metacritic gave the film a score of 58 out of 100, based on 26 critics, indicating "mixed or average reviews".

Kenneth Turan of The Los Angeles Times enjoyed the film:

Unconventional, imaginative, nothing if not audacious, Gainsbourg: A Heroic Life is a portrait of creativity from the inside, a serious yet playful attempt to find an artistic way to tell an emotional truth... the songwriter's life is heroic because he lived deeply in his own imagination and did continual battle with the personal demons who shared that space with him... Screenwriter Sfar's final word on his difficult, fascinating man is "I prefer his lies to his truth," his dreams to his reality. It's not hard to see why.

A.O. Scott of The New York Times gave it a mixed review:

[M]uch of the best and worst of Gainsbourg— the chat show provocateur and the charismatic performer — can be found on Internet video sites, which makes Gainsbourg: A Heroic Life feel a bit superfluous. Its forays into his private life, including a brief, intense affair with Ms. Bardot and a long, tumultuous relationship with Ms. Birkin, are more dutiful than revelatory. And how can Ms. Casta and Ms. Gordon, both nimble actresses (and quite beautiful), be expected to measure up against real-life goddesses whose images remain ubiquitous and irresistible? The puppets and the music make Gainsbourg: A Heroic Life engaging, but it is also visually hectic and lacks either the dramatic intensity or the arresting insight that might have lifted it out of the pedestrian realm of the admiring biopic.

== Accolades ==
The film was awarded 3 César Awards on 25 February 2011 including a César Award for Best Actor for Eric Elmosnino, a César Award for Best First Feature Film for Joann Sfar and César Award for Best Sound. It also received an additional 8 nominations.

Award / Film Festival	Category	Recipients	Result
Cabourg Film Festival	Swann d'Or for Best Actor	Éric Elmosnino	Won
César Awards	Best Film		Nominated
César Awards	Best Actor	Éric Elmosnino	Won
César Awards	Best Supporting Actress	Laetitia Casta	Nominated
César Awards	Best First Feature Film		Won
César Awards	Best Cinematography	Guillaume Schiffman	Nominated
César Awards	Best Editing	Marilyne Monthieux	Nominated
César Awards	Best Sound	Daniel Sobrino, Jean Goudier and Cyril Holtz	Won
César Awards	Best Production Design	Christian Marti	Nominated
Globes de Cristal Award	Best Actor	Éric Elmosnino	Nominated
Lumière Awards	Best Film		Nominated
Lumière Awards	Best Director	Joann Sfar	Nominated
Lumière Awards	Best Actor	Éric Elmosnino	Nominated
Magritte Awards	Best Supporting Actress	Yolande Moreau	Nominated
Tribeca Film Festival	Best Actor in a Narrative Feature Film	Éric Elmosnino	Won
