= Hygene Atoms =

Studio album by The New Pollutants
- Released: September 2002
- Recorded: 2002
- Genre: Alternative hip hop, electronica
- Length: 112:50
- Label: Independent
- Producer: Mister Speed & DJ Tr!p

The New Pollutants chronology
Hygene Atoms (2002)	Urban Professional Nightmares' (2004)

Professional ratings
Review scores
Source	Rating
3D World Magazine	4/5 stars
Onion Magazine	9/10 stars
Vice Magazine	8/10 stars

Hygene Atoms is a 2002 alternative hip hop and electronica album by Australian duo The New Pollutants (Mister Speed and DJ Tr!p), also known as Benjamin Speed and Tyson Hopprich. It is the band's debut album, and was released in September 2002.

== Track listing ==
1. "New Pollutant Rumours" – 0:35
2. "Sign Code (New Pollutants Manifesto Parts 1-4)" – 5:12
3. "The Muse" – 3:33
4. "Mathematical 1" – 1:11
5. "How Big Birds Got Their Colours" – 2:29
6. "The New Pollutants Theme Song (feat. Mecca)" – 4:26
7. "Turbo" – 1:46
8. "Online Celebrity (hyphenated.mod)" – 3:45
9. "Ghouls And Ghosts" – 3:54
10. "It's All My Fault" – 2:22
11. "Dream" – 4:37
12. "Become Flesh (New Pollutants Manifesto Parts 5-8)" – 4:28
13. "Paperback Horror" – 0:26
14. "Sign Code (Discogreen Remix)!" – 3:09
15. "Abducting (with Stickyfingers & Mecca)!" – 30:57
