= The Chinese Botanist's Daughters =

- French-language film poster
- Directed by: Dai Sijie
- Written by: Dai Sijie; Nadine Perront
- Produced by: Lise Fayolles
- Starring: Mylène Jampanoï; Li Xiaoran
- Cinematography: Guy Dufaux
- Edited by: Dominique Fortin
- Music by: Eric Lévi
- Distributed by: EuropaCorp
- Release date: 26 April 2006
- Running time: 105 minutes
- Countries: France; Canada
- Language: Mandarin

The Chinese Botanist's Daughters (French: Les filles du botaniste, Chinese: 植物园, lit. "Botanic Garden") is a French-Canadian co-produced film set in China. It was directed by Dai Sijie and released in 2006.

== Plot ==
Set in China in the 1980s or 1990s, the film tells the story of Li Ming, a young orphan of the Tangshan earthquake, who leaves to study at the home of a renowned botanist. A secretive man and commanding father, he lives on an island that he has transformed into a luxurious garden. Anxious to share this solitary life, his daughter, An, welcomes with joy the arrival of the female student. Soon their friendship develops into a sensual, but forbidden attraction. Incapable of separating themselves, Ming and An create a dangerous arrangement to be able to continue spending their lives together: Ming marries An's brother, who is a People's Liberation Army (PLA) soldier and cannot bring his wife with him. However, An and Ming's relationship is discovered by the botanist who has a heart attack when he finds out. Before he dies, he tells police that it was his daughter and daughter-in-law's homosexuality "disease" that killed him. Thus, An and Ming are sentenced to death by a court and executed.

== Casting ==
- Mylène Jampanoï – Li Ming
- Li Xiaoran – An
- Dongfu Lin – Botanist
- Weiguang Wang – Dan
- Thi Xuan Thuc Nguyen – La vieille
- Tuo Jilin – Le juge
- Dinh Xuang Tung – Policier 1
- Le Ba Anh – Policier 2
- Vuong Trach Vu – Policier 3

== Controversies ==
Permission to film in China was refused, leading to the film being shot in northern Vietnam instead (mainly in Ba Vì and Hà Tây) to create a similar environment.

== Awards and nominations ==
Montréal World Film Festival:

- Best Artistic Contribution (Guy Dufaux, won)
- People's Choice Award (Sijie Dai, won)
- Grand Prix des Amériques (Sijie Dai, nominated)

Inside Out Film and Video Festival:

- Best Canadian Film or Video (Sijie Dai, won)
