= Ari Gibson =

Australian artist and game designer (born 1983)

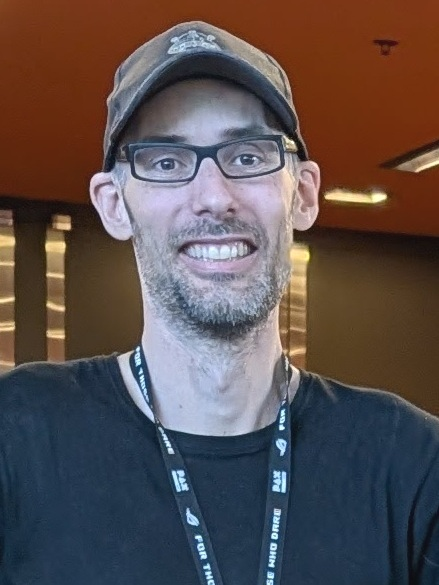
- Gibson at PAX Australia 2024
- Born: Ari Nicholas Gibson; 14 May 1983 (age 43); Adelaide, South Australia, Australia
- Education: University of South Australia
- Occupations: Artist; animator; game designer
- Years active: 2005–present
- Notable work: The Cat Piano; Hollow Knight; Hollow Knight: Silksong
- Partner: Makoto Koji

Ari Nicholas Gibson (born 14 May 1983) is an Australian artist, animator, and video game designer. He is the co-founder and co-director of the indie game development studio Team Cherry, which developed the highly successful and acclaimed titles Hollow Knight (2017) and Hollow Knight: Silksong (2025).

Before entering the video game industry full-time, Gibson worked in animation at The People's Republic of Animation from 2005 to 2010, contributing to a variety of projects such as short films and video game cinematics, most notably co-directing the award-winning short film The Cat Piano (2009). From 2010 to 2014, he co-ran the independent animation studio Mechanical Apple with Jason Pamment. Gibson co-founded Team Cherry alongside William Pellen in 2014.

== Early life and education ==
Ari Nicholas Gibson was born in Adelaide, South Australia, on 14 May 1983.

Gibson did not have a video game console for "a long time" as a child, which he recalls made them more enticing to him. His first console, the Nintendo Entertainment System, was made "doubly exciting" due this. Gibson's first video game rental was Faxanadu (1987), which he states began his love for video games. Prior to developing games professionally, he would mod them. Similarly to William Pellen, Gibson often drew video game levels in his free time at a young age. He studied at the University of South Australia from 2000 to 2003, graduating with a Bachelor of Visual Arts, majoring in New Media Art.

== Career ==
=== 2005–2010: People's Republic of Animation ===
In 2005, Ari Gibson joined The People's Republic of Animation (PRA), an animation studio based in Adelaide. At the studio, he collaborated with its co-founder Eddie White on numerous projects. Gibson's early credits include Carnivore Reflux, a 2006 Tropfest finalist, as a production designer and art director. the same year, he worked on the first two episodes of Dust Echoes—an educational twelve-part animation series published by ABC News Australia—"Whirlpool" and "Mermaid Story". He was an art director for the former and a character designer for the latter. The PRA worked on the eductional marine environment-themed short film The Amazing Adventures of Gavin, a Leafy Seadragon, which also released in 2006, with Gibson working on its background art.

Later that year, he began working on Sweet and Sour as an art director, which was a collaboration between the PRA and the Shanghai Animation Film Studio. The PRA worked on its 3D Animation. It was the first time Gibson worked with Jason Pamment, whom he went to university with. The animation released in 2007 and won awards. Gibson worked on the animated TV series pilot titled I was a Teenage Butterfly, which was made for Nickelodeon Australia and also released in 2007, co-directing the pilot alongside White. Gibson continued co-directing with White on The Cat Piano (2009), a short film that was narrated by Nick Cave. An critically acclaimed short film, it won awards such as the Australian Film Institute award for Best Animated Short Film, and was shortlisted for an Oscar. The Cat Piano was described by writers Dan and Leinors Torre as "perhaps the [PRA]'s most acclaimed short film". The PRA had also done work in the field of video games, including assisting in their cinematics and trailers. With the PRA, Gibson worked on games such as De Blob and licensed games such as ones based on Megamind, Transformers, and Hellboy.

=== 2010–2014: Mechanical Apple and music videos ===
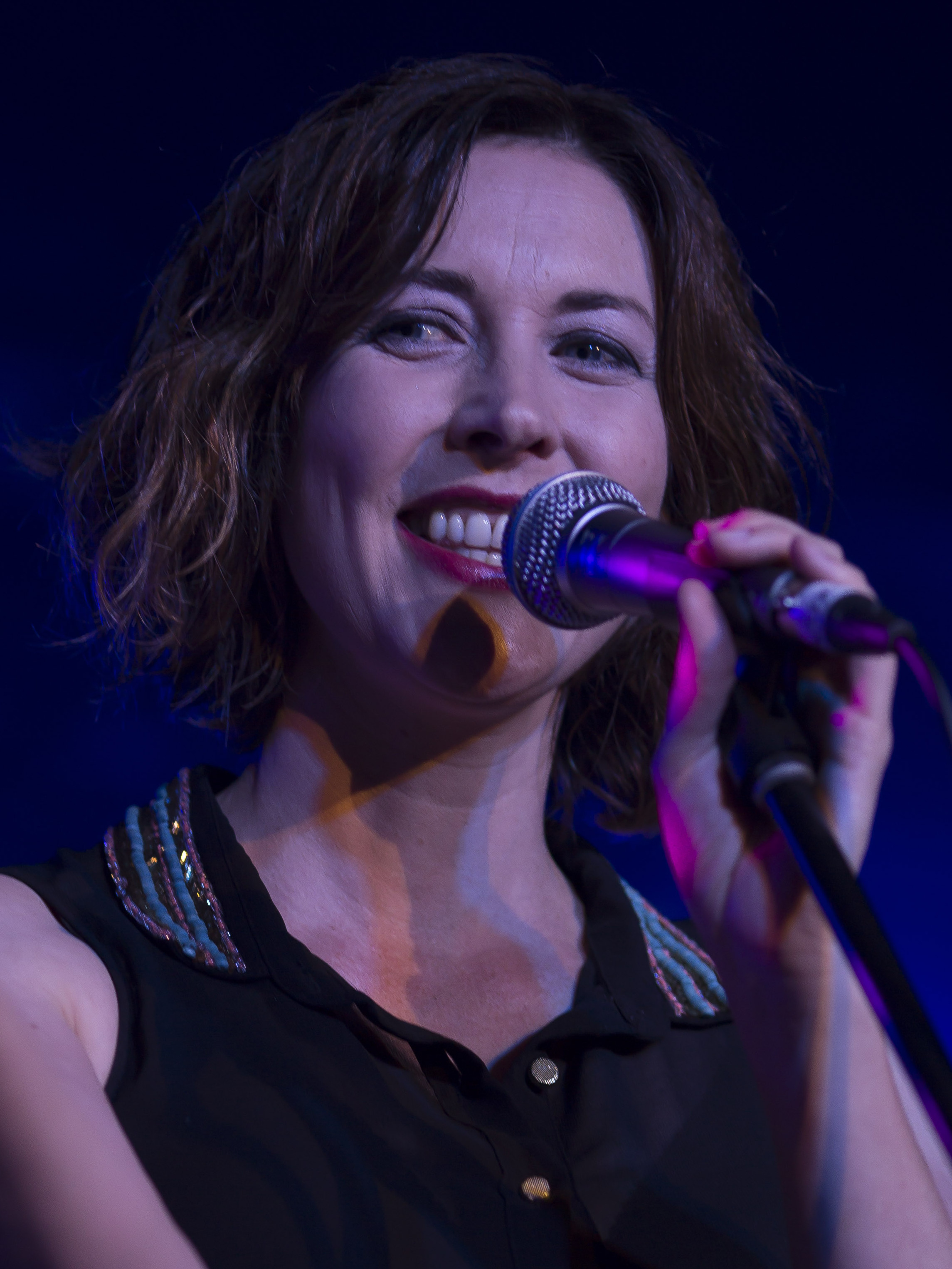
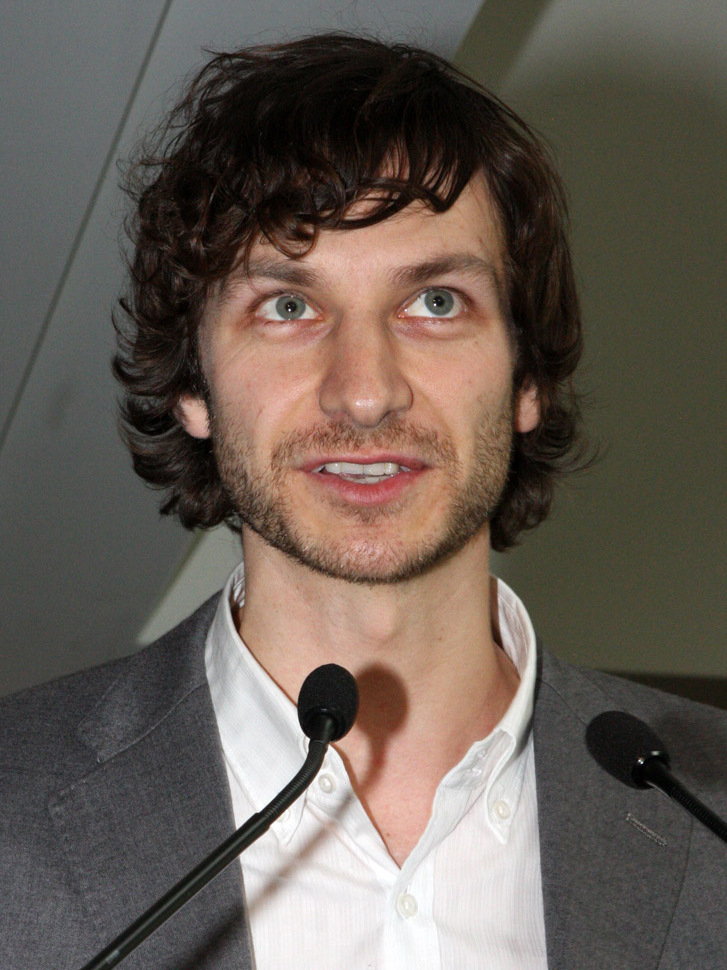
Gibson worked on animation projects such as music videos for the band The Audreys (singer pictured; left), and Gotye (right)

In 2010, after leaving the PRA, Gibson began working independently, forming the animation studio Mechanical Apple with Pamment. Their first production was a music video for The Audreys' 2010 album Sometimes the Stars's title track. They began working on it when a friend of The Audreys contacted Gibson and Pamment, who was impressed with The Cat Piano, with it releasing in early 2011 after around 3 and a half months of development.

Near the end of the music video's production, they were contacted by Australian singer-songwriter Gotye—best known for "Somebody That I Used to Know" (2011)— about the opportunity to make a music video for an "upbeat song". They turned down the offer due to the song's theming not being "the right fit for our style", but they felt that a later song by him, "Bronte", from Making Mirrors, did fit, leading them to develop and release a music video animation for it in late 2011. The animation was lauded by ScreenAnarchy, who said it "can only skyrocket Gibson into the stratosphere and cement him as one of the premier indie animators". Speaking to the Sydney Morning Herald, Gibson explained that he "tend[s] to treat music videos as almost like a short film that accompanies the music".

In 2012, following both music videos, Mechanical Apple released their first full independent short animation, Winter Fox. Mechanical Apple also produced short animated "micro loops", including one based on the then-upcoming game Mighty No. 9, animated by Gibson and released in 2013. The short clip was praised by Kotaku. Mechanical Apple released the animated short Motorbike in 2014, winning the South Australian Film Corporation's 2014 Best Animation award. Throughout its activity, Mechanical Apple also did other commercial work, including producing animation content for video games, advertisements, and television. In a 2018 interview after the release of Hollow Knight, Gibson described Mechanical Apple as having been a "quite successful" animation business, and stated that it led him to "[have] some money to survive on" while developing Hollow Knight.

=== 2013–present: Team Cherry and game design ===
In 2013, Gibson, reconnecting with his longtime friend William Pellen, who at the time was making small platformers as a hobby, suggested that they enter the 27th Ludum Dare. Its theme was 10 seconds, leading them and friend Rohan Fraser to develop Hungry Knight under the team name "Team Cherry", to poor reception. Later in the year, they released the small game Tomb Cat. In 2014, a game jam with the theme of "Beneath the Surface" began, with Gibson and Pellen planning to reuse Hungry Knight's protagonist for it. Despite missing the deadline, Gibson and Pellen "kept talking about what sort of game we could make that would fit". They remained invested in the idea, resulting in the development of a full game, Hollow Knight, starting. In November, they started a Kickstarter project for Hollow Knight, which was a success. The game was released in February 2017 to critical acclaim. Gibson co-directed and co-wrote with Pellen, and was Hollow Knight's artist and animator.

Prior to the release of Hollow Knight, Gibson and Pellen began early work on a piece of downloadable content starring Hornet as the protagonist, which eventually evolved into a sequel, Hollow Knight: Silksong. The game's development took over seven years, though Gibson described the process as enjoyable. Silksong released in September 2025, also to critical acclaim. Both titles' large success has given Gibson substantial wealth, with Hollow Knight having sold roughly 15 million copies by August 2025, and Silksong having sold over 7 million as of December 2025.

In a 2020 interview with Edge, Gibson confirmed that he and Pellen were in the very early stages of developing a non-Hollow Knight game, one then only existing through ideas shared in a Google Doc, which he described as being "expanded as each new idea comes in". In a 2025 Bloomberg interview, Gibson implied that his and Pellen's next game would not be a Hollow Knight one. In 2019 and 2023, Team Cherry filed trademarks for "Fearless Fox", which gaming news journalists took as a likely indication of an upcoming non-Hollow Knight game project by Gibson and Pellen with this title.

== Art style ==
For his most notable work, Hollow Knight, Gibson scanned his hand-drawn art directly into the game's engine. This was done to "create [a] vivid sense of place." PC Gamer writer Tom Marks described Gibson's art in Hollow Knight as using "a mostly monotone dark color palette." He characterized the character designs as "relatively clean and simple", but noted that Gibson's animation "fills them with personality". He also described Gibson's background art as quite complex, contrasting the rest of Hollow Knight's art. Rock Paper Shotgun's Philippa Warr called it "elegiac", noting the large amount of "bluey greys". Writing for GamingBolt, Shubhankar Parijat described it as "clean", "crisp", and "simple", also noting the lack of "an explosion of colour". Alana Hagues of Nintendo Life described Gibson's art in Silksong as being "a rainbow compared to the muted tones of [Hollow Knight's] Hallownest", while also still being "sombre"; stating that it used a "beautiful colour palette".

== Personal life ==
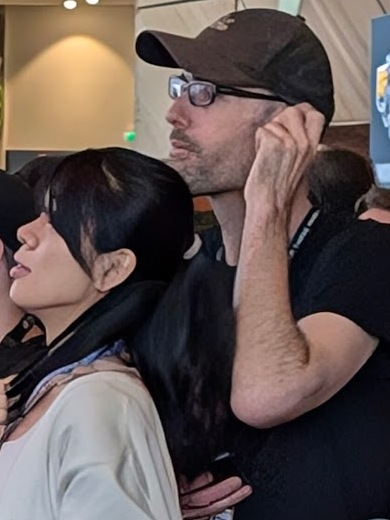
Gibson with Makoto Koji, 2024

Gibson has been in a relationship with Japanese animator Makoto Koji since 2007. Koji also voices the Hollow Knight character Hornet, alongside other characters, and shares an office with Gibson and the rest of Team Cherry as of 2018. Gibson met Pellen through mutuals in the early 2000s. Gibson is not active on private social media accounts, remarking in an interview with A Profound Waste of Time that he has no "desire to be social" in terms of social media. He attends video game conventions such as BitSummit in Japan, visiting game booths and trying out titles, and conversing with the games' developers about their work.

Despite the financial success of Team Cherry's games, he lives in a "very basic two-bedroom apartment", and spends most of his time at the Team Cherry office, finding working on games to be most enjoyable. In an August 2025 interview, he told Bloomberg that "sometimes I think, 'You know what would be better, is a one-bedroom apartment.' Because then there's even less to maintain." He also noted that the COVID-19 pandemic did not have a dramatic effect on him and his lifestyle.

=== Philanthropy ===
In 2021, Gibson co-founded The Trustee for Team Cherry Foundation alongside Pellen and Edward Bernard; they serve as directors, and the foundation consistently reports A$1,000,000 in "donations and bequests" annually, alongside occasionally investment revenue. The foundation is self-described as "providing funds to underprivileged and vulnerable South Australians through other charities".

== Selected works ==
Year	Title	Medium
2006	Carnivore Reflux	Animation
2006	Dust Echoes: Whirlpool	Animation
2006	Dust Echoes: Mermaid Story	Animation
2006	The Amazing Adventures of Gavin, a Leafy Seadragon	Animation
2007	Sweet & Sour	Animation
2007	I Was a Teenage Butterfly	Animation
2009	The Cat Piano	Animation
2011	Sometimes the Stars (music video)	Animation
2011	Bronte (music video)	Animation
2012	Winter Fox	Animation
2013	Hungry Knight	Video game
2013	Tomb Cat	Video game
2014	Motorbike	Animation
2017	Hollow Knight	Video game
2025	Hollow Knight: Silksong	Video game
TBA	Untitled non-Hollow Knight game	Video game
