= The Cat Piano =

2009 animated short film

- Film poster
- Directed by: Eddie White; Ari Gibson
- Written by: Eddie White
- Produced by: Jessica Brentnall
- Narrated by: Nick Cave
- Edited by: Jeremy Hill-Brooks
- Music by: Benjamin Speed
- Release date: 2009
- Running time: 8 minutes
- Country: Australia
- Language: English

The Cat Piano is a 2009 Australian animated short film directed by Eddie White and Ari Gibson, and narrated by Nick Cave.

== Plot ==
The Cat Piano is narrated by the main character, an anthropomorphic cat. It is clear that the narration is a poem, which the poet is typing on a typewriter. In the beginning, we are introduced to his city's love of music and musical prowess. The poet singles out one female singer of whom he is clearly enamored, quoting her singing as "A voice that made all the angels of eternity sound ... tone deaf". Shortly afterwards we are introduced to an overbearing structure beyond the sea, appearing to be a lighthouse. Its light quickly goes out, foreshadowing malevolence.

Singers and musicians begin to disappear into thin air, "Like sailors lost at sea". As police investigate the missing cats, they find human shoeprints. The main character begins to explain the Cat Piano and its terrible function. We are informed that the Cat Piano is an instrument, much like any ordinary piano or harpsichord. The terrible reality is that instead of using strings and hammers to produce the desired noise, the Cat Piano produces noise by striking a nail into the tails of one or more cats that are caged in the piano. Immediately after discovering this, the main character rushes to warn the female singer, and arrives seconds too late.

His heart broken, the city falls to pieces around him, fights break out, and music becomes forbidden. For a short while, the poet is tortured of thoughts of The Cat Piano, and can't get the sounds of screaming cats out of his head. He motions shooting himself with his hand, and with the word "Snap", we are shown a glimpse of what appears to be a nightmare. In this nightmare, a dark humanoid figure holds up a cage with the aforementioned female singer and pricks her with a needle. The poet wakes up in a cold sweat and decides to take action. He observes the lighthouse from a hill, which now casts a red beam of light, and he can hear the terrible screams of the cats from a distance.

A makeshift army of the city's citizens is shown behind him. He and the army head over to the lighthouse in boats, and upon their arrival begin to scale the lighthouse. They break into the lighthouse, and we are given a glimpse of the mad pianist. The instrument he is playing resembles more of an organ than a piano, but nevertheless it is a terrifying torture machine equipped with hundreds of needles. The poet meets eyes with the singer, who is placed at the very top of the organ. The man playing the organ turns around, and the army of cats attacks him. They bite, scratch, and claw at him until he stumbles out of a window and falls to his death.

They free the imprisoned cats, set fire to the lighthouse, and leave with the prisoners for home. The mood immediately becomes lighthearted again, as the city regains its artistic merit. The poet is sure to point out that he is no more famous or revered as he was before the incident – just an "anonymity". He is just glad to be able to listen to the sounds of music coming from the streets. As he finishes his typing, just before the story ends, the singer he was enamored with is seen in his room. She walks over to him and affectionately strokes his chin, implying a happy ending for the poet.

== Crew ==
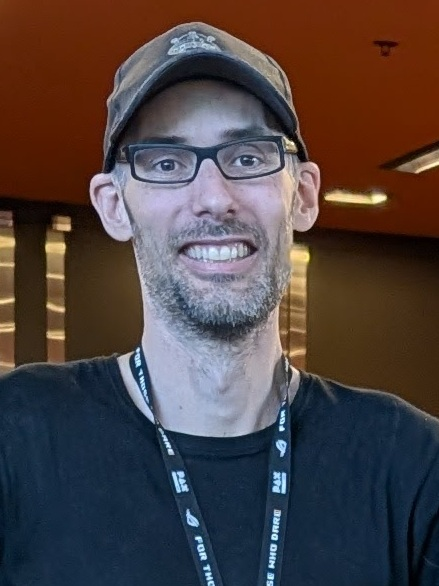
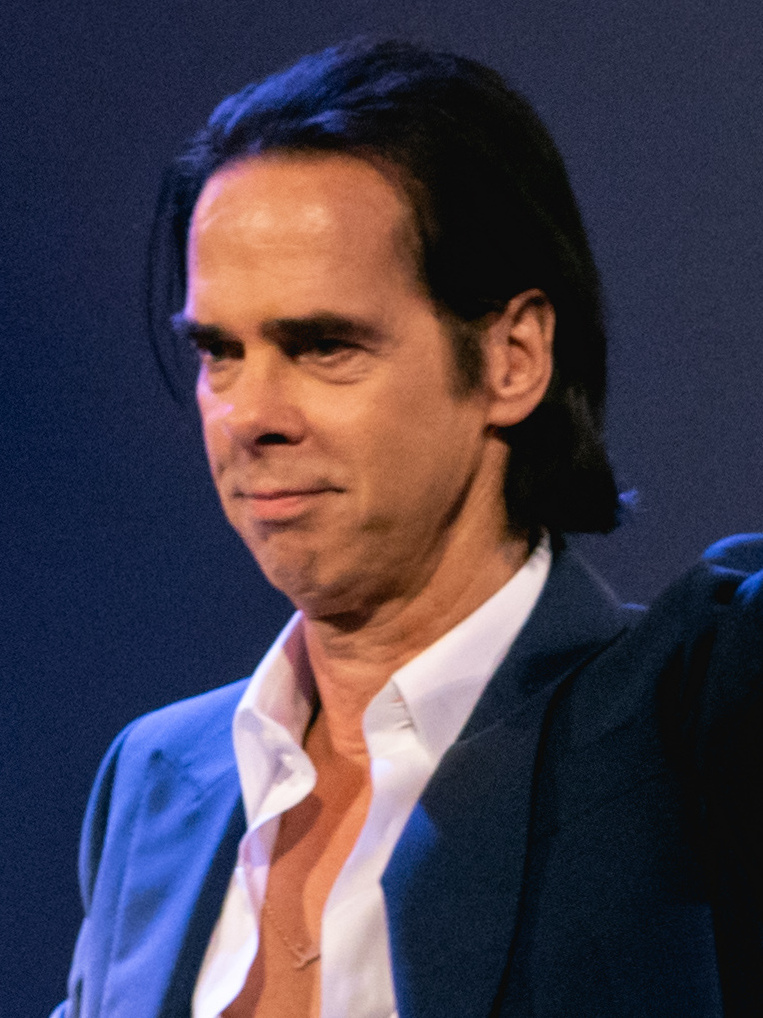
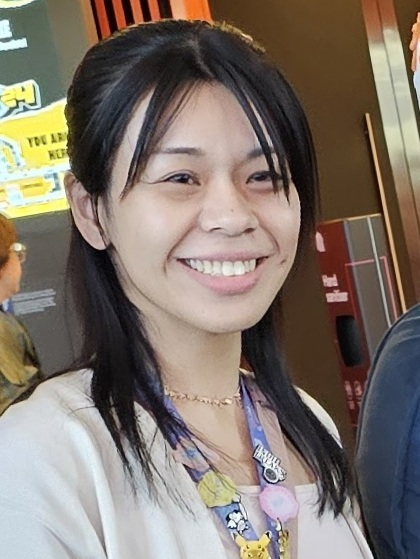
Ari Gibson (left), Nick Cave (center), Makoto Koji (right).

Production Company:	The People's Republic of Animation
Investors:	Adelaide Film Festival/South Australian Film Corporation
Executive Producers:	Nick Cave, Sam White and Hugh Nguyen
Art Director:	Jason Pamment
Animators:	Ari Gibson, Makoto Koji, Alex Grigg, Benjamin Drake and Brodie McCrossin
Production Manager:	Renee Boucher
Character Design:	Ari Gibson, Eddie White, Makoto Koji and Alex Grigg
Supervising Sound Designer:	Robert Makenzie
Sound Designer:	Tom Heuzenroeder
Sound Mixer:	Pete Smith
Compositing and VFX:	Ben Steele, Raynor Pettger and Leath Mattner
Support:	WACOM
Editor:	Jeremy Hill-Brooks – jeremyhillbrooks.com

== Awards and nominations ==
- 49th Festival International du Film d'Animation d'Annecy, Official Selection Nomination, 2009
- Australian Film Institute Awards, Best Short Animation, 2009
- Inside Film Awards, Best Animation, 2009
- 58th Melbourne International Film Festival, Best Animation Short Film, 2009
- 56th Sydney Film Festival, Dendy Award Best Animation Short, 2009
- 2009 Adelaide Film Festival, Audience Award Best Short, 2009
- APRA Screen Music Awards Best Music in a Short Film Nomination, 2009 (Benjamin Speed)
- The film won two prizes at Bø Animasjonshelg in Norway.
- It was shortlisted for the Academy Award for Best Animated Short Film in 2009.
