= The People's Republic of Animation =

Animation company based in Adelaide

- Type: Private
- Industry: Animation
- Founded: 2003; 23 years ago
- Headquarters: Adelaide, South Australia, Australia
- Key people: Eddie White (Creative Director); Sam White (Managing Director); Hugh Nguyen (Head of Development); James Calvert (Head of Production); Brodie McCrossin (Animation Director)
- Products: Film, TV Series, TV Commercials, Video Games

The People's Republic of Animation (PRA) is an animation studio based in Adelaide, Australia. It began as a creator of music videos for Australian bands in 2003, and has since created award-winning short films and TV commercials, and developed feature films.

== Foundation ==
As 14-year-olds, in 1996, PRA founders Eddie White, James Calvert & Hugh Nguyen began experimenting with a Super 8 film camera under the name of ‘Dabble Animation’. Their first short film Natural Born Animators (1998) was made two years later and achieved some national and international festival success on the student film circuit, including a selection at the Student Animation Festival in Ottawa, Ontario, Canada. In 2000, White renamed the team 'The People's Republic of Animation', a name coined after he flipped through an old Funk & Wagnall's encyclopedia looking for titles and saw the heading 'The People's Republic of China' and liked the empire-like and grand connotations it had. Animator and sculptor Brodie McCrossin joined in 2000, and producer Sam White in 2002, and the company was officially formed in 2003. The company received their first government grant for a stop motion TV pilot and computer animation for a music video in the same year.

== Works ==
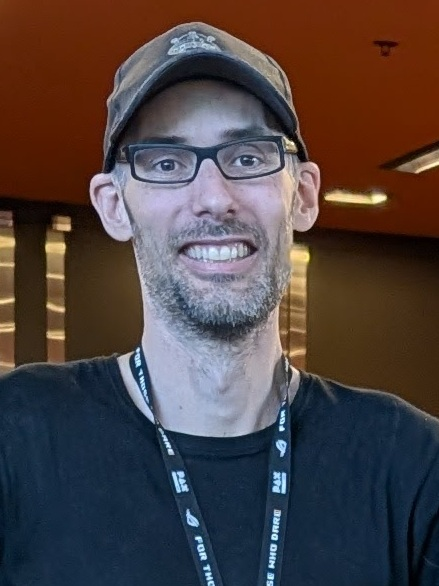
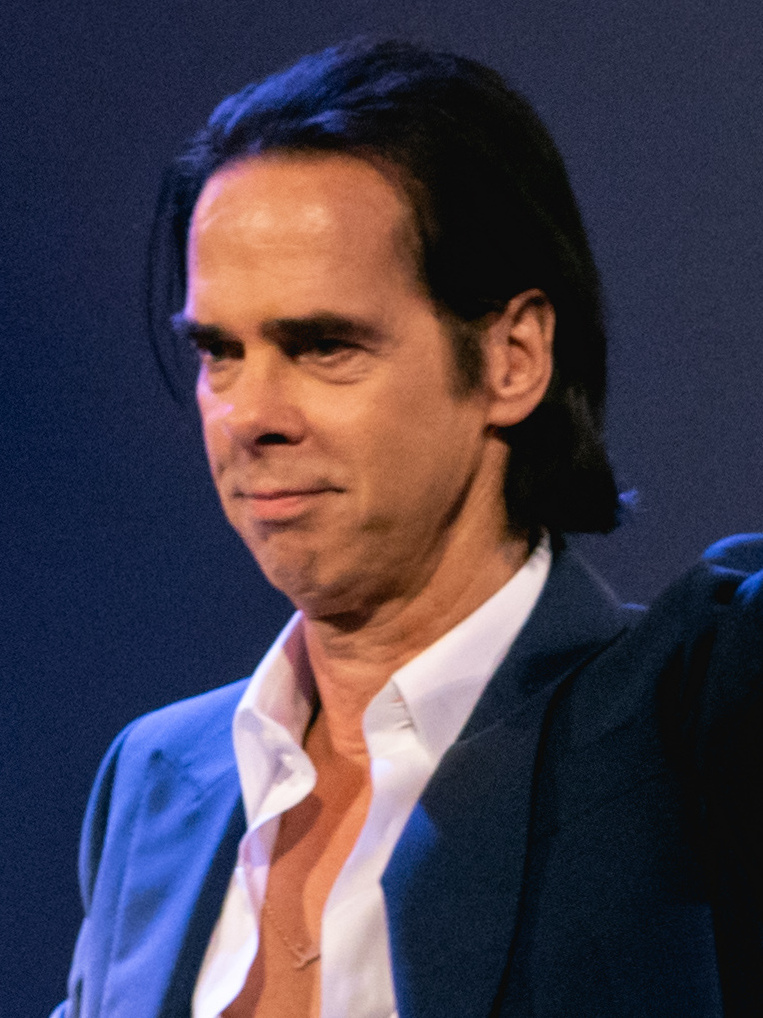
Ari Gibson (left) and Nick Cave (right).

The PRA has produced two Australian Film Institute (AFI) winning short films: Fritz gets Rich (2005) and Carnivore Reflux (2006). Carnivore Reflux was also voted best animated film by Australian audiences at the Inside Film Awards in 2006. Other notable productions include the international short film co-production with the Shanghai Animation Film Studio of China, Sweet & Sour.

White and Calvert directed the first of the Mitsubishi Lancer/Sony Tropfest 'supershort' films titled Safer in a wild world, a one-minute short that blends 2D animation and 3D animation in a pop-up storybook style. White and Ari Gibson of the PRA directed the short film The Cat Piano, with narration by Australian artist Nick Cave.

The PRA subsequently made two short films, I Was A Teenage Butterfly and The Ghastly Gourmet Cooking Show.

=== Collaborators ===
- Benjamin Speed - Composer / Musical Direction
- Deane Taylor - Art Director
- Greg Holfeld - 2D Animation Director
- Barry Plews and Hu He - Reckless Moments - Co-production partner
- Shanghai Animation Film Studio - Co-production partner
- Jessica Brentnall - Magic Films - Producer

== Filmography ==
=== Short films ===
- 2009 - The Cat Piano - 8:00 - Directed by Eddie White & Ari Gibson, Narrated by Nick Cave, Poem written by Eddie White
- 2007 - Sweet & Sour - Co-production with Shanghai Animation Film Studio and Reckless Moments – 17:00 - Written & Directed by Eddie White
- 2006 - Carnivore Reflux – 7:00 - Directed by Eddie White & James Calvert, written by Eddie White
- 2005 - Fritz Gets Rich – 12:05 - Directed by Eddie White & James Calvert, written by Eddie White

=== TV specials and interstitials ===
- 2008 - I Was a Teenage Butterfly 'Battle of the Bug Bands' - Directed by Eddie White & Ari Gibson, written by Eddie White
- 2008 - The Ghastly Gourmet Cooking Show 'Meat, Meat, Meat' - Directed by James Calvert & Eddie White, written by Eddie White
- 2006 - Dust Echoes "Whirlpool" - Directed by James Calvert
- 2006 - Dust Echoes "Mermaid Story" - Directed by James Calvert
- 2006 - Errorism: A Comedy of Terrors - Directed by Eddie White

=== Music videos ===
- 2006 - Hilltop Hoods - Clown Prince
- 2003 - The Fuzz - The Bomb (a.k.a. "Sixxx Legs")
- 2003 - Trentwood - Operation Never Fall Apart
- 2015 - Jetpack Joyride Rock Opera - Shirt Sleeves

== Awards and honors ==
- The Cat Piano
  - Winner IF (Inside Film) Award for Best Animation 2009
  - Yoram Gross Award for best short animation - Dendy Awards - Sydney Film Festival 2009
  - Winner Best Animation Short - Melbourne International Film Festival 2009
  - Winner Best Animation - IF (Inside Film Awards) 2009
  - Audience choice award for Best Short Film - 2009 Adelaide Film Festival
  - Official Selection - Short Film Competition - Annecy International Festival of Animated films 2009
  - AFI (Australian Film Institute) Awards - Nominated for Best Short Animation
  - Jury Prize for animation & Audience Award for Best Short Film - 15 Short Film Festival 2009
- Sweet & Sour
  - Golden Monkey award for Best International Co-production - China Cartoon & Animation Festival - 2008
  - Yoram Gross Award for best short animation - Dendy Awards - Sydney Film Festival 2007
  - SBS Television Award - St. Kilda Film Festival 2007
  - Winner - Best Animation - ATOM - Australian Teachers of Media Awards - 2007
  - Bronze Shorts Award (3rd prize) - Shorts Film Festival, South Australia, 2008
- Carnivore Reflux
  - Istanbul Animation Festival 2006 - Jury Prize
  - Holland Animation Festival 2006 - Movie Squad Award
  - Inside Film Awards Best Short Animation (winner) 2006
  - St Kilda Film Festival 2006 - Best Original Score (winner)
  - Shorts Film Festival 2006 - Best Under 25 years
  - Honourable mention - Zebra Poetry Film Awards, Germany 2006
  - Top 16 Finalist - Sony Tropfest, Sydney, 2006
- Mermaid Story
  - Kalamazoo Animation Festival 2007 (USA) - Jury Award for excellence in visual storytelling
- Fritz Gets Rich
  - Best Film For Children - Bradford Animation Festival, UK 2005
- The Bomb (Sixxx Legs)
  - Best Visual Effects Award - Belowground Music Video Festival 2004

== See also ==
- List of film production companies
- List of television production companies
