= Stella (2008 film) =

- Directed by: Sylvie Verheyde
- Written by: Sylvie Verheyde
- Starring: Léora Barbara; Mélissa Rodrigues; Benjamin Biolay; Karole Rocher; Guillaume Depardieu
- Edited by: Christel Dewynter
- Music by: NousDeux the band
- Production companies: Les Films du Veyrier; ARTE France; WDR
- Release date: 12 October 2008 (Gent International Film Festival)
- Running time: 103 minutes
- Country: France
- Language: French
- Budget: $2.8 million
- Box office: $1.4 million

Stella is 2008 French autobiographical film directed by Sylvie Verheyde.

== Plot ==
The film chronicles the daily life of an 11-year-old Parisian girl. Her unhappily married parents run a lively working-class bar, marked by infidelity and alcoholism, and she interacts with its rough and sometimes violent clientele. At school she performs poorly and is bullied. During the holidays she is left with her grandmother and aunt in the countryside. Throughout, she struggles as an outsider but finds support in her two friends.

== Cast ==
- Léora Barbara as Stella
- Mélissa Rodrigues as Gladys
- Laëtitia Guerard as Geneviève
- Benjamin Biolay as Stella's father
- Karole Rocher as Stella's mother
- Thierry Neuvic as Yvon
- Guillaume Depardieu as Alain-Bernard
- Anne Benoît as Madame Douchewsky

== Festivals and awards ==
- Official selection at the 2009 Seattle International Film Festival
- The Lina Mangiacapre Award, and also a Christopher D. Smithers Foundation Special Award for education about the disease of alcoholism, at the 65th Venice International Film Festival
