= Benjamin Biolay =

French singer and actor (born 1973)

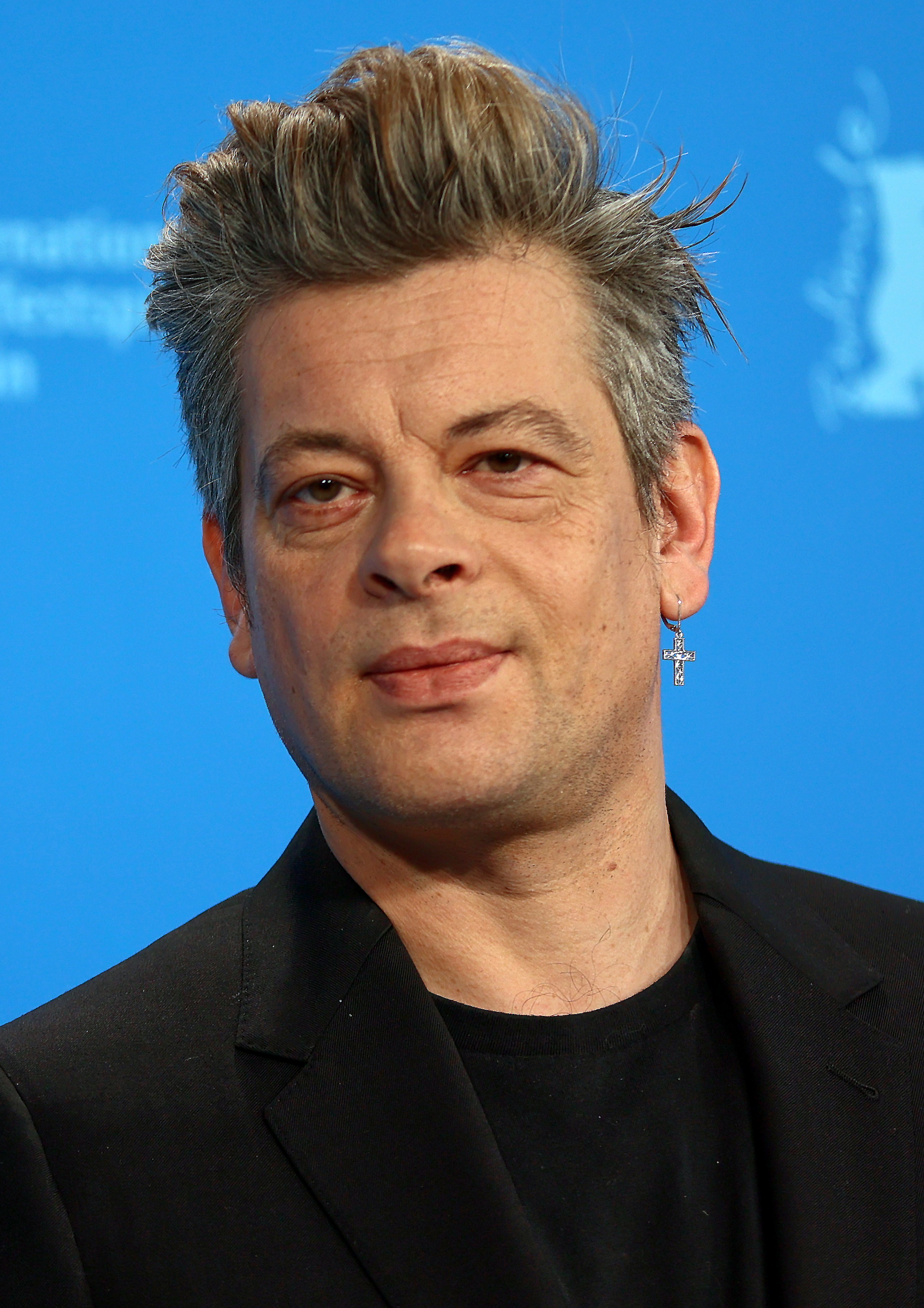
- Biolay in 2022
- Born: Benjamin Gérard Fabien Biolay; 20 January 1973 (age 53); Villefranche-sur-Saône, France
- Education: Lyon Conservatory
- Occupations: Singer; musician; songwriter; record producer; actor
- Years active: 1994–present
- Labels: Virgin; Naïve
- Spouse: Chiara Mastroianni (m. 2002; div. 2005)
- Website: benjaminbiolay.com

Benjamin Gérard Fabien Biolay (French pronunciation: [bɛ̃ʒamɛ̃ bjɔlɛ]; born 20 January 1973) is a French singer, musician, songwriter, record producer and actor. He is the brother of singer Coralie Clément—whose first three albums he wrote and produced—and the ex-husband of Chiara Mastroianni, the daughter of Catherine Deneuve and Marcello Mastroianni.

His low-key vocal style is somewhat similar to French pop star Étienne Daho. With the singer Keren Ann, whose first two albums he co-wrote and produced, he contributed several songs to Chambre avec Vue, the successful comeback album of singer Henri Salvador, and has since worked as a writer, arranger or producer for other icons of French music, including Juliette Gréco, Julien Clerc, Françoise Hardy, Vanessa Paradis and Nolwenn Leroy.

He wrote or performed most of the songs on the 2004 soundtrack to Clara et Moi by Arnaud Viard, and released the album Home with his wife the same year. After two more rock oriented albums in 2005 and 2007 he was dropped by his record company and began working on his first independent release, La Superbe, released on Naïve records in 2009. This was followed by the soundtrack album Pourquoi tu pleures in 2011 and Vengeance in 2012.

== Personal life ==
Benjamin was married to actress and singer Chiara Mastroianni from 2002 to 2005; they have a daughter, Anna, born 22 April 2003.

== Discography ==
=== Albums ===
Solo studio albums

| Year | Album | Peak positions | | | | | |
| Year | Album | FRA | BEL (Fl) | BEL (Wa) | GER | SPA | SWI |
|---|---|---|---|---|---|---|---|
| 2001 | Rose Kennedy | 66 | – | – | – | – | – |
| 2003 | Négatif | 15 | – | 9 | – | – | – |
| 2005 | À l'origine | 17 | – | 27 | – | – | – |
| 2007 | Trash Yéyé | 11 | – | 23 | – | – | 72 |
| 2009 | La Superbe | 3 | – | 7 | 98 | 97 | 61 |
| 2011 | Pourquoi tu pleures? | 38 | – | 54 | – | – | – |
| 2012 | Vengeance | 2 | 95 | 6 | – | 42 | 22 |
| 2015 | Trenet | 19 | 174 | 12 | – | – | – |
| 2016 | Palermo Hollywood | 3 | 107 | 6 | – | – | 17 |
| 2017 | Volver | 3 | 129 | 1 | – | – | 12 |
| 2020 | Grand Prix | 1 | 110 | 1 | – | – | 3 |
| 2022 | Saint-Clair | 1 | – | 1 | – | – | 7 |
| 2023 | À l'auditorium | – | – | 19 | – | – | 90 |
| 2025 | Le disque bleu | 2 | – | 1 | – | – | 13 |

Joint albums

| Year | Album | Peak positions | |
| Year | Album | BEL (Wa) | SWI |
|---|---|---|---|
| 2004 | Home (with Chiara Mastroianni) | 26 | 98 |

Compilation albums

| Year | Album | Peak positions |
| Year | Album | BEL (Wa) |
|---|---|---|
| 2011 | Best Of | 178 |

=== EPs ===
| Year | EP title |
|---|---|
| 2001 | Benjamin Biolay Remix EP |

=== Soundtracks ===
| Year | Album | Peak positions |
| Year | Album | FR |
|---|---|---|
| 2004 | Clara et Moi | 163 |

=== Singles ===
| Year | Single | Peak positions | | | Album |
| Year | Single | FR | BEL (Wa) | BEL (Wa) Tip | Album |
|---|---|---|---|---|---|
| 2008 | "Qu'est ce que ça peut faire?" | – | – | 14 | |
| 2010 | "La superbe" | – | 38 | – | |
| 2010 | "Si tu suis mon regard" | – | – | 32 | |
| 2011 | "Ton héritage" | – | – | 28 | |
| 2011 | "Pas la forme" | – | – | 25 | |
| 2012 | "Aime mon amour" | 60 | 39 | – | |
| 2012 | "Profite" (feat. Vanessa Paradis) | 93 | – | 24 | |
| 2012 | "Ne regrette rien" (feat. Orelsan) | 157 | – | – | |
| 2014 | "Ton héritage" (rerelease) | 80 | – | – | |
| 2014 | "Pas besoin de permis" (with Vanessa Paradis) | 35 | – | – | |
| 2016 | "Palermo Hollywood" | 161 | – | – | |
| 2017 | "Roma (Amor)" (with Illya Kuryaki and the Valderramas) | 136 | – | – | |
| 2018 | Paris Sur Mer (on Morcheeba's "Blaze Away" album) | | | | |

Featured in

| Year | Single | Peak positions | Album |
| Year | Single | FR | Album |
|---|---|---|---|
| 2003 | "L'hymne à l'amour" (Aznavour, Boulay, Eicher, Biolay, Macias, Maurane, Foly, Fontaine, Mami, Leroy, Pagny & Badi) | 50 | |

=== Other charted songs ===
| Year | Song | Peak positions | Album |
| Year | Song | FR | Album |
|---|---|---|---|
| 2017 | "Retiens la nuit" | 80 | On a tous quelque chose de Johnny |

== Selected filmography ==
| Year | Title | Role | Notes |
|---|---|---|---|
| 2008 | Stella | Stella's father | Nominated—César Award for Best Supporting Actor |
| 2010 | The Pack | The Spack's son | |
| 2013 | Under the Rainbow | Maxime Wolf | |
| 2014 | The Easy Way Out | Gérard | |
| 2015 | The Lady in the Car with Glasses and a Gun | Michel Caravaille | |
| 2016 | Encore heureux | Antoine | |
| 2016 | Faultless (Irréprochable) | Gilles | |
| 2016 | Fleur de tonnerre | Mathieu Verron | |
| 2017 | Number One | Marc Ronsin | |
| 2017 | Memoir of War | | |
| 2019 | Capitaine Marleau | Philippe Louveau | TV series (1 episode) |
| 2019 | Chambre 212 | Richard Warrimer at 40 | |
| 2020 | The Eddy | Franck Levy | |
| 2021 | France | Fred de Meurs | |
| 2022 | The Line | Julien | |
| 2022 | Le Monde d'hier | Didier Jansen | |
| 2022 | Stella est amoureuse | Serge Vlaminck | |
| 2022 | Comme une actrice | Antoine | |
| 2022 | Un hiver en été | Franck | |
| 2023 | Rosalie | Barcelin | |

== Honours ==
- Officer of the Ordre des Arts et des Lettres (2010)
