= All About Actresses =

- Directed by: Maïwenn
- Written by: Maïwenn
- Produced by: François Kraus; Denis Pineau-Valencienne
- Starring: Jeanne Balibar; Romane Bohringer; Julie Depardieu; Mélanie Doutey; Marina Foïs; Estelle Lefébure; Maïwenn; Linh-Dan Pham; Charlotte Rampling; Muriel Robin; Karole Rocher; Karin Viard
- Cinematography: Pierre Aïm
- Edited by: Laure Gardette
- Music by: Gabriel Yared
- Production companies: Les Films du Kiosque; SND Films; Groupe M6; France 2 Cinéma
- Distributed by: SND
- Release date: 28 January 2009
- Running time: 100 minutes
- Country: France
- Languages: French; English
- Budget: $3.7 million
- Box office: $2.6 million

All About Actresses (French: Le Bal des actrices), also known as The Actress' Ball, is a 2009 French mockumentary film directed by Maïwenn. The title is a reference to the film directed by Roman Polanski, The Fearless Vampire Killers (Le Bal des vampires).

== Cast ==
- Jeanne Balibar : Herself
- Romane Bohringer : Herself
- Julie Depardieu : Herself
- Mélanie Doutey : Herself
- Marina Foïs : Herself
- Estelle Lefébure : Herself
- Maïwenn : Herself
- Linh Dan Pham : Herself
- Charlotte Rampling : Herself
- Muriel Robin : Herself
- Karole Rocher : Herself
- Karin Viard : Herself
- Joey Starr : Himself
- Yvan Attal : Himself
- Jacques Weber : Himself
- Pascal Greggory : Himself
- Bertrand Blier : Himself
- Christine Boisson : The drama teacher
- Marilyne Canto : Marina's director
- Charlotte Valandrey : Yvan's casting director
- Nina Morato : Marina's casting director
- Laurent Bateau : Marina's doctor
- Boris Terral : The actor with Jeanne
- Samir Guesmi : Jennifer's husband
- Marie Kremer : Karin's makeup artist
- Georges Corraface : Jeanne's director
