= Madame Claude =

French madam

- Born: Fernande Grudet; 6 July 1923; Angers, France
- Died: 15 December 2015 (aged 92); Nice, France
- Known for: Brothel keeper

Fernande Grudet (6 July 1923 – 15 December 2015), also known as Madame Claude, was a French brothel keeper. In the 1960s, she was the head of a French network of call girls who worked especially for dignitaries and civil servants.

== Biography ==
Born on 6 July 1923 in Angers, France, there are conflicting accounts of Grudet's origins, ranging from an aristocratic father in politics and an education by nuns to a father who ran a small cafe and early work selling food from a pushcart. Another unverified tale about her past includes work as an agent of the French Resistance during the German Occupation of France during World War II and imprisonment in a Nazi concentration camp. After the war, she worked as a prostitute but claimed she "was never pretty enough" and was better suited to management. By 1961, she had set up what became the most exclusive prostitution network in Paris for the next decade.

At this time she ran a brothel in the expensive 16th arrondissement of Paris. "There are two things that people will always pay for: food and sex. I wasn't any good at cooking", she is reputed to have said.

Her wealthy clientele included political figures and members of the Mafia, and her status as an informant for the police ensured she was protected. Her address book, Grudet claimed, had included the names of the shah of Iran, John F. Kennedy, and Gianni Agnelli, who was the president and principal shareholder of Fiat in the 1960s.

In 1976, judge Jean-Louis Bruguière began dismantling Grudet's organization. She was being pursued for unpaid taxes, amounting to 11m francs (around £4.9m), and fled to Los Angeles, but returned to France in 1986, serving a three-month jail sentence. After her release, she attempted to set up a prostitution organization, but in 1992, she was sentenced to a term in Fleury-Mérogis Prison for procuring.

Her life was the basis of the feature film The French Woman (1977), directed by Just Jaeckin, and starring Françoise Fabian. Grudet died in Nice on 19 December 2015. In 2021, Netflix released another biographical film based on her life titled Madame Claude. She is also namechecked in the Roxy Music song "If It Takes All Night", from their 1974 album Country Life.

== Bibliography ==
- Madam, by Claude Grudet, ed. Michel Lafon (1994): history of Madame Claude by Madame Claude.
- Les filles de Madame Claude, by Elizabeth Antébi and Anne Florentin, Stock-Julliard (1974).
- Madame Claude, by William Stadiem (2018), St. Martin's Press.
