= 2006 Tropfest finalists =

The Tropfest short film festival is held in Sydney, Australia each year. This is the List of 2006's Short Listed films and winners.

The deadline for submissions was January 19.

== A Room with Askew ==
Synopsis: A room askew and a meal that may never happen.

Director: Gregory Godhard

Producer: Gregory Godhard

Writer: Gregory Godhard

Cinematographer: Gregory Godhard

Sound design: Gregory Godhard

Composer: Gregory Godhard

Editor: Gregory Godhard

Length: 5' 20"

Shot On: 16 mm

== Applause ==
Synopsis: Struggling to find motivation, office worker Werner Brim is confronted with a most unusual situation - replacing the couch and coffee table in his office is a live audience...and they want to be entertained!

Director: Michael Noonan

Producer: Michael Noonan Carine Chai

Writer: Michael Noonan

Cinematographer: Linton Vivian

Sound design: David Lazar

Composer: David Lazar

Editor: Michael Noonan Brendan Cahill

Key Cast: Troy Stoilkovski Jeff Dornan

Length: 6' 59"

Shot On: DV Cam

== Burst ==
Synopsis: To forgive is to set yourself free.

Director: Juliet Lamont

Producer: Gail Williamson

Writer: Juliet Lamont

Cinematographer: Tania Lambert

Sound design: Tom Jefferson

Editor: Jake Southall

Key Cast: Leeanna Walsman Richard Cotter Charlie Rose Wonson

Length: 7'

Shot On: HDV

== Carmichael & Shane (Winner 2006) ==
Synopsis: A single father has a unique approach to raising his two-year-old twin boys- pick a favourite.

Director: Alex Weinress Rob Carlton

Producer: Alex Weinress Rob Carlton

Writer: Rob Carlton

Cinematographer: Alex Weinress

Sound design: Alex Weinress

Editor: Alex Weinress

Key Cast: Rob Carlton Leo Carlton Jim Carlton

Length: 6' 20"

Shot On: DV

== Carnivore Reflux ==
Synopsis: In their lifetime the average meat-eating human will consume; 10 cows, 1/2 tonne of fish, 760 chickens, 37 sheep and 42 pigs.

Director: Eddie White James Calvert

Producer: Huy Nguyen Sam White

Writer: Eddie White

Sound design: Ashley Klose

Composer: Benjamin Speed

Editor: James Calvert David Ngo

Key Cast: John Waters

Length: 7'

Shot On: Maya, Flash

== Fishy ==
Synopsis: A perfect Christmas dinner is wasted on a demanding picky, fussy snapper with impossibly high standards.

Director: Dale Sidney

Producer: Pamela Smith

Writer: Dale Sidney Damian Lynch

Cinematographer: Barry Malseed

Sound design: Jason Murphy

Composer: Blair JoscelyneÞ

Editor: Seth Lockwood

Key Cast: Terry Camilleri

Length: 6'

Shot On: 16 mm

== Glitch ==
Synopsis: Tim has a problem. The house he lives in no longer obeys the laws of logic. At times like this, there's only one man that can help.

Director: Leon Ford

Producer: Leon Ford

Writer: Leon Ford

Cinematographer: Sarah Spillane

Sound design: Nick Arnold

Composer: Nick Arnold

Editor: Leon Ford

Key Cast: Nicholas Cassim Justin Smith Kristian Schmid

Length: 4' 5"

Shot On: Mini DV

== Goggles ==
Synopsis: Seven-year-old Billy encounters a couple of bullies on his way to the pool.

Director: Olivia Peniston-Bird

Producer: Rebecca Peniston-Bird

Writer: Rebecca Peniston-Bird

Cinematographer: Katie Milwright

Sound design: Dean Linguey

Composer: Sarah-Jane Wentzki

Editor: Nigel Karikari

Key Cast: Morgan Baker Emily Milledge Ellen Watson Olivia Northwood-Blyth

Length: 4' 20"

Shot On: HDV

== How many Doctors does it take to change a Lightbulb? ==
Synopsis: Rosie visits the local medical centre for a routine check-up... unfortunately it's anything but routine! Are you due for a check-up?

Director: Marie Patane

Producer: Marie Patane Aimee Durrant

Writer: Marie Patane

Cinematographer: Marie Patane Jason van Gendernen

Editor: Aimee Durrant

Key Cast: Rob Carlton Helen Sutermeister Marty Lynes Shane Emmett

Length: 7'

Shot On: DV

== Last Stop ==
Synopsis: Even the simple act of taking public transport seems to be fraught with peril these days. Especially if you're from somewhere else.

Director: Greg Williams

Producer: Tatiana Doroshenko Jacob Oberman Greg Williams

Writer: Tatiana Doroshenko Greg Williams

Cinematographer: Katie Milwright

Sound design: Andrew Neil

Composer: Nicolas Lyon

Editor: Billy Browne

Key Cast: Donna McRae Steve Adams Brendan Bacon Katrina Mathers Tamara Donnellan Ella Tingwell Simon King Ross Thompson Jacob Oberman

Length: 5'

Shot On: DV

== Pacific ==
Synopsis: On a lonely beach, a chance encounter with a fisherman is the key to a young man letting go of his past and embracing his future.

Director: Peter Carstairs

Producer: Madeleine Shaw

Associate Producer: Cecilia Ritchie

Writer: Ant Horn Peter Carstairs

Cinematographer: Jules O'Loughlin

Sound design: Sasha Zastavnikovic

Composer: Abacus Roolz

Editor: Andrew Soo

Key Cast: Harry Greenwood Kate Crawford Kieran Darcy-Smith

Length: 7'

Shot On: 35 mm 2-perf

== Silencer ==
Synopsis: A secret rendezvous. A loaded gun. A most unexpected arrival. Nobody said it was easy offing your best mate. Beware the thoughts of ordinary evil men.

Director: Frazer Bailey

Producer: Steve Campbell

Writer: Trent Dalton

Cinematographer: Tony Luu

Sound design: Steuart Welch

Composer: Slade Gibson

Editor: Steve Cooper

Key Cast: Andy McPhee John Brumpton

Length: 6' 55"

Shot On: 16 mm

== Sister, The ==
Synopsis: Amelia finally stands up to her sister, and discovers it's a piece of cake.

Director: Belinda King

Producer: Belinda King

Writer: Belinda King

Cinematographer: Craig Anderson

Sound design: Craig Anderson

Editor: Belinda King

Key Cast: Sharn Hammond Nick Beech Belinda King

Length: 6' 13"

Shot On: Mini DV

== Snakepit ==
Synopsis: Australia, two guys, a small room, sixty-three deadly snakes ... only one man is at home.

Director: János Zúzmara

Producer: János Zúzmara

Cinematographer: János Zúzmara

Sound design: János Zúzmara

Composer: Doug Gibson

Editor: Siobhan Jackson Marcel Rasquin Nicki Johnson

A documentary featuring: Federico Rossignoli

Length: 6' 36"

Shot On: Mini DV

== Story of the Bubbleboy, The ==
Synopsis: In a stab-happy world, a sad outcast wrestles with his demons. The story of bubbleboy is a film about being trapped by the past and redeemed by the future.

Director: Sean Ascroft

Producer: Sean Ascroft Karl Mather Kristy Fransen

Writer: Karl Mather

Cinematographer: John Simpson

Sound design: Danny Grifoni

Composer: Hylton Mowday

Editor: Sean Ascroft

Key Cast: Andrew Supanz Nina Pearce

Length: 6'

Shot On: 35 mm

== Tough Crowd ==
Synopsis: A petulant little girl proves to be a tough crowd for a tireless mime artist.

Director: Patrick Gillies

Producer: Patrick Gillies Jeremy Brennan

Writer: Jeremy Brennan Patrick Gillies

Cinematographer: Patrick Gillies Meek Zuiderwijk

Composer: Jeremy Brennan

Editor: Patrick Gillies

Key Cast: Jeremy Brennan

Length: 4' 30"

Shot On: DV

Malice In Wonderland

Dairy Farmers Youth Award 2006 Directed by Sarah Goddard and Emily-Kate Byrne Shot on: 16mm
