= Sylvie Verheyde =

French film director, actress, and screenwriter

- Born: 1967 (age 58–59); Paris, France
- Occupations: Film director, screenwriter, actress

Sylvie Verheyde (born 1967) is a French film director, actress, and screenwriter.

== Career ==
The films Verheyde has directed include Un frère (1997), in which Emma de Caunes won a César Award for Most Promising Actress, Princesses (2000), Amour de Femme (2001), Stella (2008) and Confession of a Child of the Century (2011), starring Pete Doherty, which was screened at the 2012 Cannes Film Festival, Sex Doll (2016; she also wrote the screenplay for this film), and Madame Claude (2021).

With Sylvie Ohayon, she co-wrote the screenplay of the 2021 film Haute Couture.

Stella (2008) and Stella In Love (2022) are both based on Verheyde's childhood. Sex Doll (2016) and Madame Claude (2021) are about prostitution, a topic close to Verheyde as her grandmother and one of her cousins were prostitutes.

== Filmography ==
Year	Title	Credited as		Notes
Year	Title	Director	Screenwriter	Notes
1991	Entre chiens et loups	Yes	Yes	Short
1992	La maison verte	Yes	Yes	Short
1997	Un frère...	Yes	Yes	
2000	Princesses	Yes	Yes	
2001	Un amour de femme	Yes	Yes	TV movie
2007	Scorpion		Yes	
2007	Sang froid	Yes	Yes	TV movie
2008	Stella	Yes	Yes	
2012	Confession of a Child of the Century	Yes	Yes	
2013	Lescop, la nuit américaine	Yes	Yes	
2014	Papa Was Not a Rolling Stone		Yes	
2016	Sex Doll	Yes	Yes	
2021	Ibrahim		Yes	
2021	Haute couture		Yes	
2021	Madame Claude	Yes	Yes	
2022	Stella est amoureuse	Yes	Yes	
2024	Nudes	Yes		TV mini-series

== Awards ==
- Best Director for Sang froid at Television Festival of La Rochelle, 2007
- Lina Mangiacapre Award and Christopher D. Smithers Foundation Special Award, at the 65th Venice International Film Festival, for Stella

== See also ==
- List of female film and television directors
- List of LGBT-related films directed by women
