= Occidental =

Occidental may refer to:

== Places ==
- Occident, (of or pertaining to) the Western world
  - Western world, (of or pertaining to)
- Occidental, California, a town in Sonoma County, California, US
- Occidental Park, Seattle, Washington, US

== Arts and entertainment ==
- Occidental Observer, far-right online publication
- The Occidental Quarterly, an American racialist journal
- Occidental (film), a 2017 French thriller drama film

== Organizations ==
- Occidental College, located in Los Angeles, California, US
- Occidental Life Insurance Company, a former American insurer
- Occidental Petroleum, an American oil company

== Other uses ==
- Interlingue, a constructed language formerly known as Occidental
- Occidentals, an early 1900s all-black baseball team of Salt Lake City, US; see Salt Lake Bees

== See also ==
- Cordillera Occidental (disambiguation)
- Davao Occidental, a province in the Philippines located in the Davao Region in Mindanao
- Misamis Occidental, a province of the Philippines located in the Northern Mindanao region
- Negros Occidental, a province of the Philippines located in the Western Visayas Region
- Occident (disambiguation)
- Occidental Mindoro, a province in the Philippines located in the Mimaropa region
- Occidentales, a defunct baseball team of the Cuban National Series
- Sierra Madre Occidental, a mountain range in Western Mexico
