= All About Love =

All About Love may refer to:

== Film ==
- All About Love (2001 film), a French film
- All About Love (2005 film), a Hong Kong romance
- All About Love (2006 film), a Philippine anthology film
- All About Love (2010 film), a Hong Kong film
- All About Loving, a 1964 French comedy film

== Music ==
- "All About Love", a song from the 1975 Earth, Wind & Fire album That's the Way of the World
- All About Love (Joyce Sims album), 1989
- All About Love (Johnny Mathis album), 1996
- All About Love (Steven Curtis Chapman album), 2003
- All About Love (Yeng Constantino album), 2014
- All About Love, an album by Laila
- All About Love, an album by Roger Whittaker
- All About Love, an album by Engelbert Humperdinck, 2023

== Other uses ==
- All About Love: New Visions, a 2001 book by bell hooks
