= Occident (disambiguation) =

The Occident is usually a historic term for the Western world (as contrasted with the Orient).

Occident or The Occident may also refer to:

- Occident (film), a 2002 Romanian film
- Occident (movement), a former French far-right political group
- The Occident and American Jewish Advocate, a 19th-century Jewish-American periodical
- Occident, California, former name of the community Maxwell, California, US
- Occident, Indiana, an unincorporated community in Rush County
- "Occident", a song from the album Have One on Me by Joanna Newsom

== See also ==
- Occidental (disambiguation)
