= Last Journey of Paul W.R. =

- French: Le Dernier Voyage
- Directed by: Romain Quirot
- Screenplay by: Romain Quirot; Antoine Jaunin; Laurent Turner
- Produced by: Fannie Pailloux; David Danesi
- Starring: Hugo Becker; Jean Reno; Paul Hamy
- Cinematography: Jean-Paul Agostini
- Edited by: Romain Quirot
- Music by: Etienne Forget
- Production companies: Apaches; Digital District
- Distributed by: Tandem (France)
- Release dates: 1 September 2020 (FFA); 19 May 2021 (France)
- Running time: 87 minutes
- Country: France
- Language: French
- Budget: $3.2 million
- Box office: $868,168

Last Journey of Paul W.R. is a science fiction film directed by Romain Quirot, which premiered at the Angoulême Francophone Film Festival in September 2020 and opened at the Sitges Film Festival where it also celebrated its international premier. It is the feature-length sequel to Quirot's short film The Last Journey of the Enigmatic Paul W.R

== Plot ==
In the near future, temperatures on Earth have reached new, unbearable levels. Most wildlife species have gone extinct and hundreds of millions of people have become climate refugees while the world's oil, coal and gas reserves are depleted. Some time ago a new planet had appeared in the sky. Mankind had gone to great lengths to get there and mine the mineral Lumina, which revolutionized science. The hyper-energetic element rendered all other sources of energy on earth obsolete. With the planet now on a collision course with Earth, only one man can save the world. His name is Paul W.R. However, the astronaut disappeared without a trace a few hours before the start of a planned rescue mission some time before. Since then, he has been relentlessly hunted by the desperate humans.

An accident has left his brother Elliot able to read the minds of those around him, and he begins searching for Paul to return him home for the mission. Paul has his reasons for not wanting the planet to be destroyed even though ecological catastrophe is imminent. He crosses Elma's path, and together Paul and the teenager make their way through the desert that France has become. Elliot ruthlessly kills several people by controlling their minds and making them commit suicide in his pursuit of Paul. Paul continues to search for his lost memories in the desert with Elma. A spider drone sent to pursue Paul’s location reports back to Elliot.

== Cast ==
- Hugo Becker as Paul W.R
- Jean Reno as Henri W.R
- Paul Hamy as Eliott W.R
- Lya Oussadit-Lessert as Elma
- Philippe Katerine as The radio host
- Bruno Lochet as César
- Émilie Gavois-Kahn as Simone
- Jean-Luc Couchard as The weird guy

== Production ==
=== Development ===
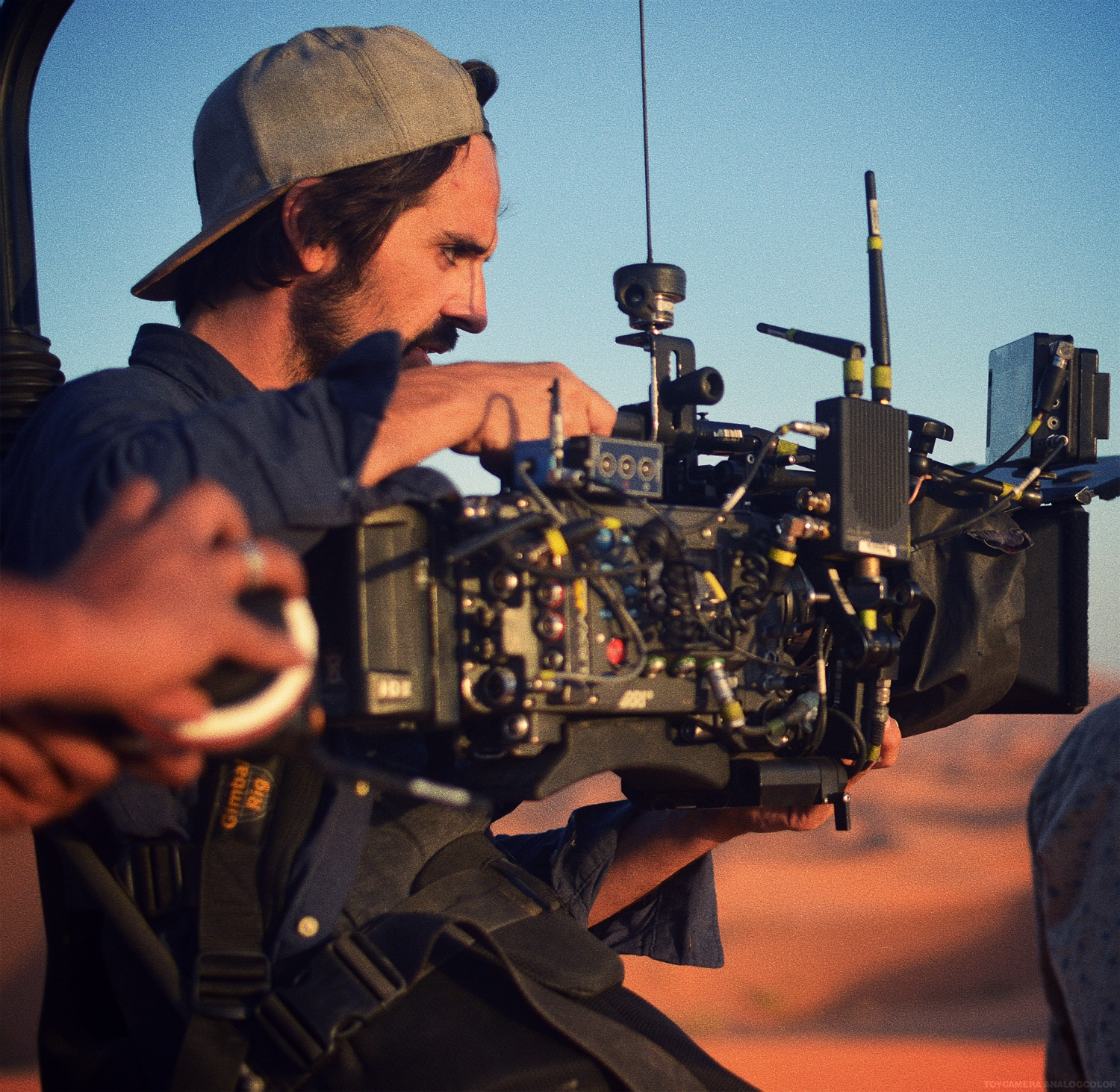
The director Romain Quirot 2019 during the shooting

The low-budget sci-fi film was directed by Romain Quirot. The premise and the character Paul WR he already used it in his short film Le Dernier Voyage de l'énigmatique Paul W.R., which celebrated its international premiere in April 2016 at the Tribeca Film Festival. The film won Best Science Fiction Short Film at the Berlin Short Film Festival. Quirot was assisted in rewriting the script and expanding the story for the feature film by Laurent Turner and Antoine Jaunin.

The director went back into the universe of Paul W.R. for the feature film adaptation and added elements of a road movie and the character of the teenager Elma. Quirot told Bulles de Culture that Elma is one of the characters he feels closest to, that of an im in a collapsing world and has a desperate father who no longer believes in anything. He said the character was inspired by today's young people trying to find their place in a changing world.

=== Casting ===
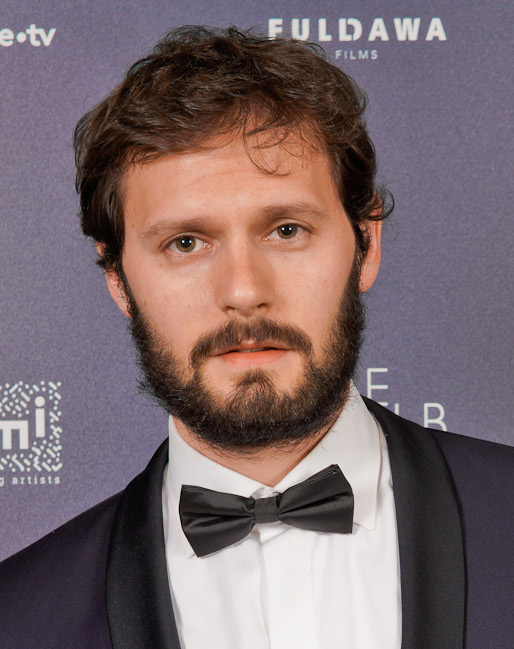
Hugo Becker plays the title role Paul W.R.

As in the short film, Hugo Becker plays the only remaining astronaut, Paul W.R., in the title role, while up-and-coming actress Lya Oussadit-Lessert plays the young Elma who works alongside him. Becker explained that it was important that Paul W.R. meets someone who makes him think, but who he needs to protect at the same time. Thus, the two acted as each other's shields, but in different ways. Paul is a lost character who needs an outside perspective to see clearly. Elma, on the other hand, needs a family because she no longer has a father. Other roles include Jean Reno as Henri W.R., Paul Hamy as Eliott W.R., Bruno Lochet as Cesar and Emilie Gavois-Kahn as Simone.

=== Filming ===
Filming took place in Paris and in the city of Ouarzazate in southern Morocco and in the desert there. As in Quirot's short film, Jean-Paul Agostini acted as cameraman. Olivier Seiler was responsible for the set design. In order to give the film a French look and thus break away from US science fiction film templates, Quirot deliberately used a Peugeot as the airworthy car of the future.

=== Music ===
The soundtrack was contributed by Etienne Forget. The composer, with whom the director also worked on his short film, reused some of the original track. The soundtrack album with 15 pieces of music was released by Music Box Publishing for download at the end of July 2021.

== Box office ==
The first screening took place on 1 September 2020, at the Angoulême Francophone Film Festival. In mid-October 2020, he was screened at the Sitges Film Festival shown. The film was released in French cinemas on May 19, 2021 and was published in July 2021 in Cannes presented at the Marché du film. UK distribution rights are held by Altitude, Eurovideo in Germany and Kinology in North America. The film was released on DVD and Blu-ray in Germany on 30 September 2021. It has been available digitally since September 16, 2021.

== Critical reception ==
The Filmdienst describes the film as a "science fiction adventure that mixes elements of a road movie and a family drama in its dystopian plot, while remaining somewhat confusing, but implementing its scenario in a visually and atmospherically appealing way."

Laurent Cambon writes in AVoir ALire, Le Dernier Voyage is an inspired film and showed in every scene traces of the films of Luc Besson. However, instead of concentrating on the fantasy genre, Romain Quirot gets lost in family sentimentality. The relationship between the girl and the astronaut on the run gives the film rhythm and meaning. He also adds a distinctly political connotation to his story when he tells the reasons for the destruction of the earth in the future.

=== Accolades ===
Sitges Festival Internacional de Cinema Fantàstic de Catalunya|Sitges Film Festival 2020

- Nominated for Best Film in the Official Fantàstic Competition (Romain Quirot)
- Award for Best Feature Film with the Méliès d'Argent
