= Hugo Becker (actor) =

French actor (born 1987)

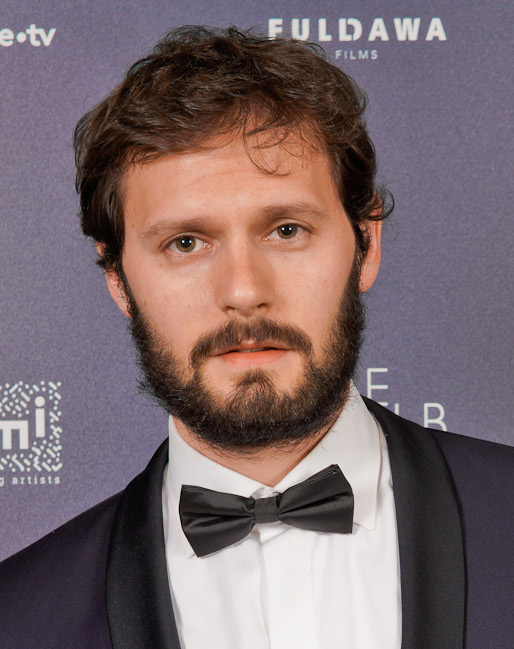
- Becker at the 2018 Cannes Film Festival
- Born: 13 May 1987 (age 39)
- Education: Cours Florent; Royal Academy of Dramatic Art
- Occupations: Actor; director; producer
- Years active: 2010–present

Hugo Becker (born 13 May 1987) is a French actor, director and producer. He is known for his roles as Louis Grimaldi in the American drama television series Gossip Girl and Romain in the French thriller series Chefs.

== Career ==
Becker attended the Conservatory of Dramatic Art in France, the court Florent (Olga Hörstig Prize) and the Royal Academy of Dramatic Art of London.

He was part of the promotion of Young Talents Cannes in 2010. That same year, he made his debut on screen in a variety of roles. He played a young politician in L'Assaut, directed by Julien Leclercq, an alcoholic hitchhiker in La Proie, directed by Eric Valette, a student in Marie-Castille Mention Schaar's Ma Première Fois and a young businessman in La Croisière, by Pascale Pouzadoux.

In 2010, he made his debut in Hollywood, playing Louis Grimaldi, Prince of Monaco, in the CW drama Gossip Girl. Initially, he signed on for two episodes in the fourth season. Later, his role was extended for another eighteen episodes.

In 2011, he played Xavier in the American film Damsels in Distress, directed by Whit Stillman. The film closed the 68th Venice Film Festival and was selected at the Toronto Film Festival.

In 2012, Becker starred as Antoine Lavoisier in the American docufiction Mystery of the Matter, directed by Mr. Meyer. In 2013, Hugo played Isaac Dreyfuss, a football star involved in a terrorist affair, for two episodes of the BBC1 series Silent Witness.

In 2014, he played the role of Romain in the 6 episodes of the miniseries Chefs alongside Clovis Cornillac, for which he received the Adami Prize for the best promising actor at the Luchon festival.

Since 2014, he has been one of the producers at Nouvelle Donne Productions.

In 2015 and 2018, he played the lead role of André Merlaux, a young recruit to the French secret service in the year 1960, in the two seasons (24 episodes) of the French television series Au service de la France, known in English as A Very Secret Service.

In 2016, he began playing the role of Cyril Balsan in the political drama series Baron Noir alongside Niels Arestrup, Kad Merad and Anna Mouglalis. In the same year, he starred in a main role alongside Yon González and Lluís Homar in the Spanish crime drama series Bajo sospecha. He played the role of a police officer infiltrated to find a missing person in a hospital in Madrid. He also played the role of Guillaume in the comedy Un jour mon prince, directed by Flavia Coste.

In 2018, he starred in Xavier Durringer's Paradise Beach alongside Sami Bouajila, Kool Shen, Seth Gueko and Tewfik Jallab. In the same year, he starred in Jusqu'ici tout va bien, by Mohamed Hamidi, alongside Gilles Lellouche, Malik Bentalha and Sabrina Ouazani.

In 2019, he starred as Paul Vanhove in the Netflix science fiction series Osmosis. He is set to play a role as Paul WR in Le dernier voyage de l'énigmatique Paul W.R. by Romain Quirot and as Max in the film Döner directed by Jean-Luc Herbulot.

Hugo Becker is fluent in English and Spanish.

== Filmography ==
=== Film ===
Year	Title	Role	Notes
2010	La mariée n'est pas qu'une marchande de frites	Guillaume	Short film
2010	The Assault	Vincent Leroy	
2011	The Prey	The hitchhiking student	
2011	La Croisière	Alix's contributor	
2011	Damsels in Distress	Xavier	
2012	Ma première fois	Antoine	
2013	Breathe In	Clement	
2013	Hybris	Guillaume	Short film
2014	F.A.N	The man	Short film; also director, writer and producer
2014	La dernière virée	Alexandre	Short film
2014	Le pont de l'ange		Short film
2015	Le dernier voyage de l'énigmatique Paul WR	Paul WR	Short film
2016	Un jour mon prince	Guillaume	
2016	City of Lost Love	Thibault	
2017	1971 Motorcycle Heart	Christian Ravel	Short film
2017	La nuit juste avant les forêts	The man	
2019	Jusqu'ici tout va bien	Mike	
2019	Paradise Beach	Franck	
2020	Last Journey of Paul W.R.	Paul W.R	
2022	Pilote	Daniel	
2022	Tempête	Pierre	
2023	For My Country	David	
2023	Vaincre ou mourir	François de Charette	
2023	Apaches	Bel Oeil	
2023	Les Grands Hommes	Sylvain	Short film
TBA	Döner	Max	
TBA	Maria	The director	
TBA	Ici et là bas		

=== Television ===
Year	Title	Role	Notes
2010–2012	Gossip Girl	Louis Grimaldi	18 episodes
2011	Julie Lescaut	Thierry Bouvier	Episode: "La mariée du pont neuf"
2011	R.I.S, police scientifique	Emmanuel	Episode: "Requiem assassin"
2013	Jo	Eddy	2 episodes
2014	Silent Witness	Isaac Dreyfus	Episode: "Commodity" (2 parts)
2014	Collection rue des ravissantes: Boris Vian fait son cinéma	The hitchhiker	Episode: "L'autostoppeur"
2014	Où es-tu maintenant?	Mathieu Delmas	Television film
2015	The Mystery of Matter: Search for the Elements	Antoine Lavoisier	Miniseries; episode: "Out of Thin Air"
2015	Mystère à l'Opéra	Paul Santerre	Television film
2015–2016	Chefs	Romain	Main role; 14 episodes Luchon International Film Festival – Best Young Actor
2015–2018	A Very Secret Service	André Merlaux	Main role; 24 episodes
2016	Bajo sospecha	Alain Juillard	10 episodes
2016–2020	Baron Noir	Cyril Balsan	Main role; 18 episodes
2018	La mort dans l'âme	Tristan Delmas	Television film
2018	Tu vivras ma fille	Simon Laffargue	Television film
2018	Deux gouttes d'eau	Antoine / Tom Delvoye	Television film
2019	Osmosis	Paul Vanhove	Main role; 8 episodes
2020	Call My Agent!	Éric	Episode: "Charlotte"
2021	Leonardo	Thierry	3 episodes
2021–2023	Je te promets	Paul Gallo	Main role; 34 episodes
2022	Diane de Poitiers	Henry II of France	Miniseries
2024	The New Look	Hervé	7 episodes
TBA	Concordia	Alexandre	
TBA	La Peste	Sylvain Rambert	Miniseries

== Theatre ==
Year	Title	Author	Director
2016	La nuit juste avant les forêts	Bernard-Marie Koltès	Paul-Emile Fourny
2018	Amadeus	Peter Shaffer	Paul-Emile Fourny
2019	Roberto Zucco	Bernard-Marie Koltès	Paul-Emile Fourny
2019	Le cas Eduard Einstein	Laurent Seksik	Stéphanie Fagadau

== Awards and nominations ==
Year	Association	Category	Work	Result
2015	Luchon International Film Festival	Best Young Actor	Chefs	Won
