= Un jour mon prince =

2016 French-Canadian film

- French theatrical release poster
- Directed by: Flavia Coste
- Written by: Flavia Coste; Gábor Rassov
- Produced by: Antoine de Clermont-Tonnerre
- Starring: Mylène St-Sauveur; Sarah-Jeanne Labrosse; Jean-Luc Couchard; Hugo Becker; Flavia Coste; Pierre-François Martin-Laval; Catherine Jacob
- Cinematography: Philippe Lavalette
- Edited by: Guillaume Bauer
- Music by: Jorane
- Production companies: MACT Productions; Christal Films; Paradis Films; France 3 Cinéma
- Distributed by: Paradis Films (France); Les Films Christal (Canada)
- Release dates: 2 April 2016 (Festival du Cinéma Européen); 11 January 2017 (France); 4 May 2018 (Canada)
- Running time: 82 minutes
- Countries: France; Canada
- Language: French
- Budget: $2 million

Un jour mon prince (lit. 'One Day My Prince') is a 2016 fantasy comedy film directed by Flavia Coste. It stars Mylène St-Sauveur, Sarah-Jeanne Labrosse, Jean-Luc Couchard, Hugo Becker, Coste, Pierre-François Martin-Laval and Catherine Jacob.

== Premise ==
In order to prevent their enchanted world to disappear, Queen Titiana sends two Quebec fairies, Blondine and Mélusine, to Paris on a mission to find the ideal man to awaken Sleeping Beauty before her 100th birthday.

== Cast ==
- Sarah-Jeanne Labrosse as Blondine
- Mylène St-Sauveur as Mélusine
- Hugo Becker as Guillaume
- Jean-Luc Couchard as Puck
- Flavia Coste as Pauline
- Catherine Jacob as Queen Titania
- Pierre-François Martin-Laval as The Crow
- Margaux Van den Plas as The Beauty
- Thomas Coumans as Jack
- Christophe Sermet as Bernard Kléber
- Vanessa Dolmen as Nigea
- Lilas-Rose Gilberti as Aurore
- Jean-Philippe Azéma as Aurore's father
- Catherine Artigala as Madame Desrivière
- Christian Caro as Arnaud Clément
- Julie Maes as Ambreline
- Finn Bell as Jean-Luc kléber
- Lydia Indjova

== Production ==
The film was shot in Paris, Nogent-sur-Marne, Charente-Maritime and Angoulême from 20 June to 26 August 2015.

The film premiered at the Festival du Cinéma Européen on 2 April 2016, and was screened at the Cabourg Film Festival on 11 June 2016 and at the Arras Film Festival on 14 November 2016.
