= The Soul Eater (film) =

2024 French horror thriller film

- Film poster
- Original title: Le mangeur d'âmes
- Directed by: Julien Maury; Alexandre Bustillo
- Written by: Annelyse Batrel; Ludovic Lefebvre
- Based on: Le Manger d'Âmes by Alexis Laipsker
- Starring: Virginie Ledoyen; Paul Hamy; Sandrine Bonnaire
- Production company: Phase 4 Productions
- Distributed by: Star Invest Films
- Release date: 2024
- Running time: 108 minutes
- Country: France
- Language: French

The Soul Eater (French: Le mangeur d'âmes) is a 2024 French crime thriller horror film directed by Julien Maury and Alexandre Bustillo, based on the novel of the same name by Alexis Laipsker. It stars Virginie Ledoyen, Paul Hamy, and Sandrine Bonnaire.

== Premise ==
A man named Franck investigates a series of child disappearances and crosses paths with a woman, Elizabeth, investigating murders in the same village. These intertwined cases turn up references to a local bogeyman legend called "the soul eater".

== Cast ==
- Virginie Ledoyen as Elizabeth Guardiano
- Paul Hamy as Franck de Rolan
- Sandrine Bonnaire as Docteur Carole Marbas
- Francis Renaud as Brigadier-Chef Marcelin
- Malik Zidi as Fabrice Gonnet
- Cameron Bain as Evan Vasseur

== Release ==
The Soul Eater premiered at the 2024 International Film Festival Rotterdam. It had its North American premiere at the Fantasia International Film Festival.

=== Critical reception ===
On the review aggregator website Rotten Tomatoes, 80% of 20 critics' reviews are positive. The website's consensus reads: "An elegantly crafted horror procedural tinged with fairy tale elements, The Soul Eater uses subtle performances and lingering dread to deliver an unflinching, haunting portrait of hidden evil."

Meagan Navarro of Bloody Disgusting gave the film a mostly positive review, commenting that it "plunge[s] into dark subject matter with aplomb" and that it "comes alive and shows its distinct personality in the back half." Matthew Donato of Collider wrote that the film "blends unsettling folkloric imagery into a procedural thriller that’s not quite Longlegs or Megalomaniac, but will still leave your soul wounded and rotten by the time the credits roll." Jennie Kermode of Eye For Film gave it a highly positive review, calling it the directors' "most accomplished" film to date.
