= Virginie Ledoyen =

French actress (born 1976)

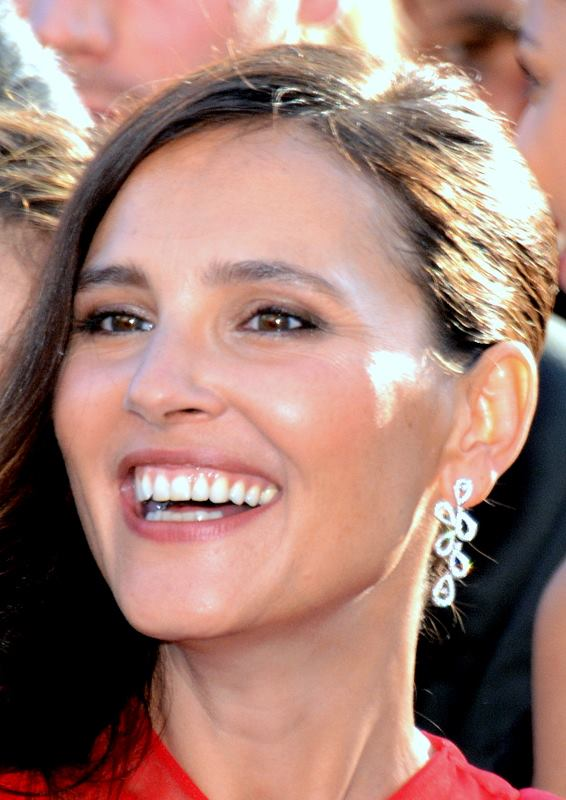
- Ledoyen in 2015
- Born: Virginie Fernández; 15 November 1976 (age 49); Paris, France
- Occupation: Actress
- Years active: 1986–present
- Spouse: Iain Rogers (m. 2006; div. 2007)
- Partners: Louis Soubrier (1995–2005); Arie Elmaleh (2007–2015)
- Children: 3

Virginie Fernández (born 15 November 1976), known by her stage name Virginie Ledoyen (French: [viʁʒini lədwajɛ̃]), is a French actress. She has appeared in French, English and American films.

== Life and career ==
Ledoyen was born in Paris and raised in Aubervilliers, the daughter of Olga, a restaurateur, and Bernard Fernández, a merchant who sold cleaning products and knives. Her paternal grandfather was Spanish. She was a print model from the age of two and later took on the stage name "Ledoyen" after the maiden name of her maternal grandmother, who was a stage actress.

Ledoyen's film breakthrough came with A Single Girl (1995) (stylized La Fille seule), for which she was nominated for a César Award for Most Promising Actress. She also received two César Award nominations for Les marmottes (1993) and L'eau froide (1994). Outside France, her best-known role is in The Beach (2000). In the fall of 2000, she signed a contract as a spokesmodel with the cosmetics company L'Oréal. She was featured alongside two models, Laetitia Casta and Noémie Lenoir. She portrayed the character Cosette in the 2000 French television miniseries of Les Misérables.

On 29 September 2001, Ledoyen gave birth to her first child, a girl, with her boyfriend, production designer Louis Soubrier, whom she met on the set of La fille seule in 1995. She was in a short-lived marriage with Iain Rogers, a film director, from 2006 to 2007. From 2007 to 2015, she was in a relationship with actor Arie Elmaleh, whose brother was her co-star in The Valet. Ledoyen and Elmaleh have a son, born in July 2010, and a daughter, born in April 2014.

In 2013 Ledoyen was named as a member of the jury at the 70th Venice International Film Festival.

== Filmography ==
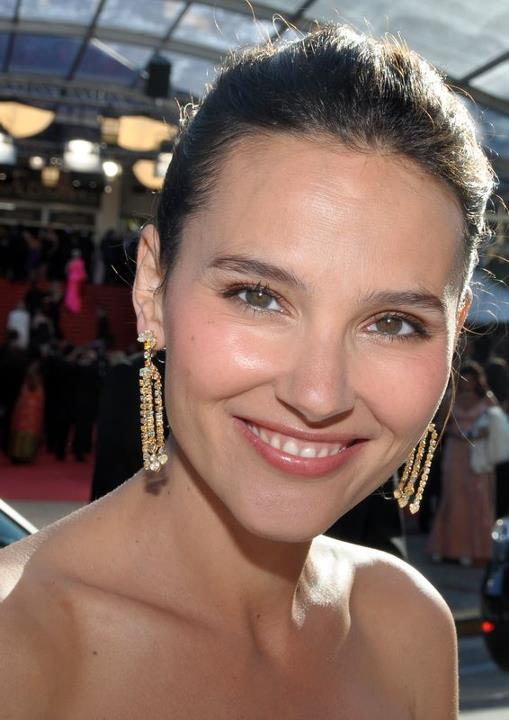
Ledoyen at the 2012 Cannes Film Festival.

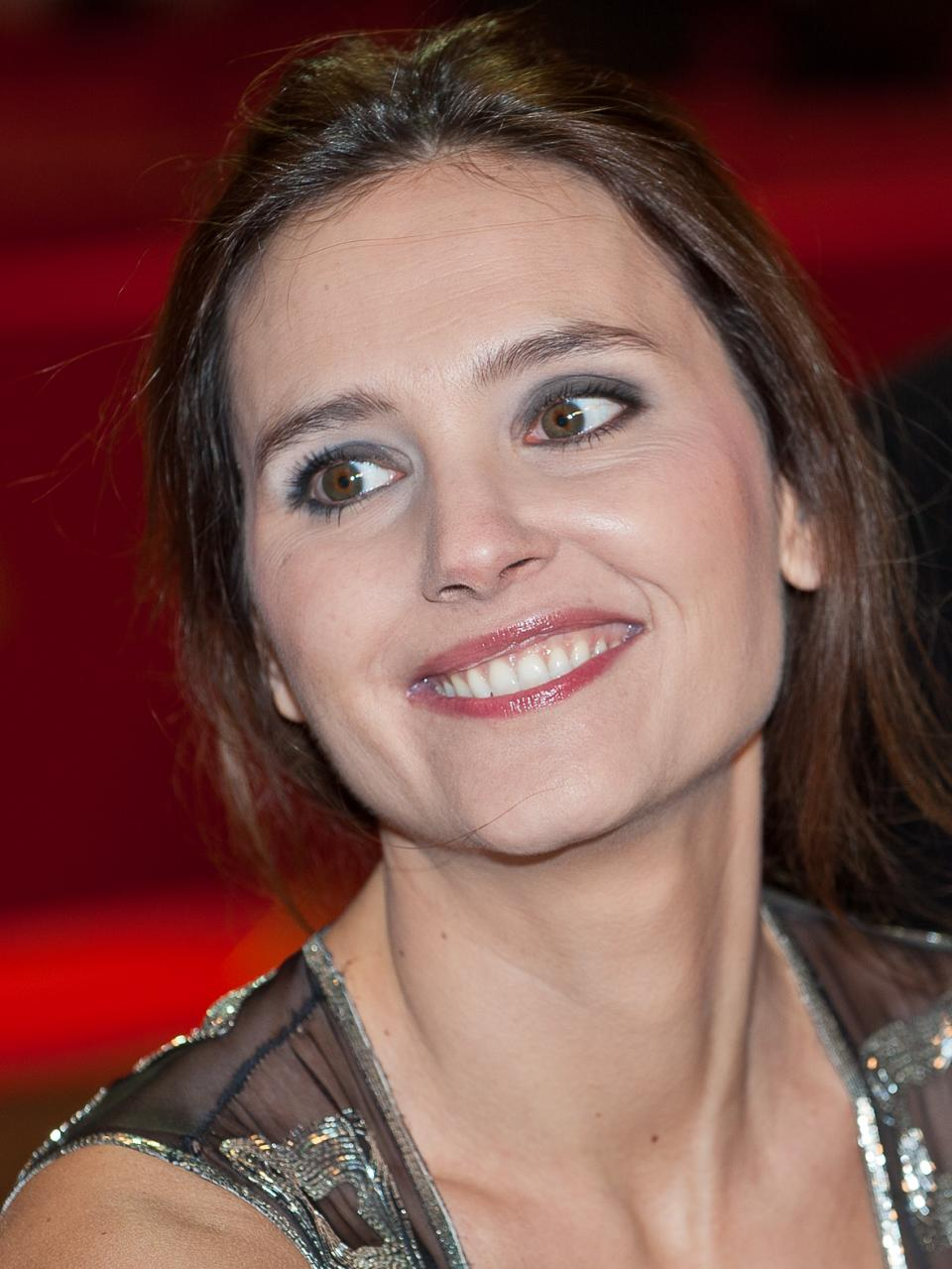
Ledoyen at the 2012 Berlinale.

| Year | Title | Role | Notes |
|---|---|---|---|
| 1986 | Exploits of a Young Don Juan | Berthe | |
| 1988 | La Vie en panne | Joëlle | TV mini-series |
| 1990 | Haute tension | Dominique (15-year-old) | TV series |
| 1991 | Mima | Mima | |
| 1991 | The Children Thief | Gabrielle | |
| 1992 | Mouche | Mouche | Incomplete |
| 1993 | Les Marmottes | Samantha | Nominated—César Award for Most Promising Actress |
| 1994 | La Folie douce | Charlie Léger | |
| 1994 | La Règle de l'homme | Violette | Telefilm |
| 1994 | Cold Water | Christine | Nominated—César Award for Most Promising Actress |
| 1995 | A Single Girl | Valérie Sergent | Nominated—César Award for Most Promising Actress |
| 1995 | La Cérémonie | Melinda | |
| 1995 | La Vie de Marianne | Marianne | Telefilm |
| 1995 | Sur la route | | Short film |
| 1995 | Les Sensuels | | Telefilm |
| 1996 | Mahjong | Marthe | |
| 1997 | Ma 6-T va crack-er | The girl with the pistol | |
| 1997 | Héroïnes | Johanna | |
| 1998 | The Perfect Guy | Jeanne | Paris Film Festival - Best Actress |
| 1998 | A Soldier's Daughter Never Cries | Billy's Mother | |
| 1998 | Late August, Early September | Anne | |
| 1998 | In All Innocence | Cécile Maudet | |
| 2000 | The Beach | Françoise | Nominated—Teen Choice Award - Choice Movie: Chemistry |
| 2001 | All About Love | Maria | |
| 2002 | 8 Women | Suzon | Berlin Film Festival - Silver Bear for Outstanding Artistic Achievement; European Film Award for Best Actress |
| 2002 | Les Misérables | Cosette | TV mini-series |
| 2003 | Mais qui a tué Pamela Rose ? | The cleaning lady | |
| 2003 | Bon Voyage | Camille | |
| 2004 | Saint Ange | Anna Jurin | |
| 2006 | The Valet | Émilie | |
| 2006 | Holly | Marie | |
| 2006 | The Backwoods | Lucy | |
| 2006 | La Forteresse assiégée | L'impératrice Eugénie | Telefilm |
| 2007 | Shall We Kiss? | Judith | |
| 2008 | London mon amour (Mes amis, mes amours) | Audrey Morraine | |
| 2008 | L'Emmerdeur | Louise | |
| 2009 | The Army of Crime | Mélinée Manouchian | |
| 2009 | Myster Mocky présente | Martha in Mémoriam | TV series |
| 2010 | Tout ce qui brille | Agathe | |
| 2011 | The Last Beast | Clémence | |
| 2011 | XIII: The Series | Irina | TV series |
| 2011 | The Shape of Art to Come | | Short film |
| 2012 | Farewell, My Queen | Gabrielle de Polignac | |
| 2013 | Another Life | Dolorès | |
| 2013 | Scènes de ménages | | TV series |
| 2013 | À votre bon cœur, mesdames | Lisa | |
| 2014 | Ablations | Léa Cartalas | |
| 2014 | Le Monde de Fred | Herself | |
| 2015 | Rabid Dogs (Enragés) | The Woman | |
| 2018 | MILF | Cécile | |
| 2018 | Remi, Nobody's Boy | Madame Harper | |
| 2019 | Notre Dame | Coco | |
| 2019 | A Magical Journey | Mother | |
| 2020 | Capitain Marleau | Anne Duplesis | TV series |
| 2020 | Ils étaient dix | Barbara | TV series |
| 2021 | Nona et ses filles | Emmanuelle | TV series |
| 2022 | L'île aux 30 cercueils | Christine Vorksy | TV series |
| 2022 | The King's Favorite | Anne of Pisseuleu | TV series |
| 2023 | Homecoming | Sylvia | |
| 2023 | Just the Two of Us | Candice | |
| 2024 | Le mangeur d'âmes | Commandant Elisabeth Guardiano | |
| 2025 | The Au Pair | Marie | TV series |

== Other awards ==
- 1998: Prix Suzanne Bianchetti
