= La Vie nouvelle =

La Vie Nouvelle
- Directed by: Philippe Grandrieux
- Cinematography: Stéphane Fontaine
- Release date: 2002
- Running time: 102 minutes
- Country: France

A New Life (French: La Vie nouvelle) is a 2002 French experimental erotic horror film directed by Philippe Grandrieux, and starring Zachary Knighton and Anna Mouglalis.

== Plot ==
The story involves a young American who falls obsessively in love with a mysterious courtesan named Melania against the backdrop of a dilapidated Eastern European landscape.

== Sources ==
=== Writing in English ===
- Beugnet, Martine. (2005) ‘Evil and the senses: Philippe Grandrieux’s Sombre and La Vie nouvelle’, Studies in French Cinema, 5(3), pp. 175–184. https://doi.org/10.1386/sfci.5.3.175/1.
- Beugnet, Martine. (2007) Cinema and sensation: French film and the art of transgression. Edinburgh: Edinburgh University Press.
- Chamarette, Jenny. (2013) Phenomenology and the future of film: rethinking subjectivity beyond French cinema. Basingstoke: Palgrave Macmillan. [See chapter 5: Threatened Corporealities: Thinking with the Films of Philippe Grandrieux]
- Goddard, Michael. (2011) ‘Eastern Extreme: The Presentation of Eastern Europe as a Site of Monstrosity in La Vie nouvelle and Import/Export’, in Tanya Horeck and Tina Kendall (eds) The New Extremism in Cinema: From France to Europe. Edinburgh: Edinburgh University Press, pp. 82–92.
- Hainge, Greg. (2007) ‘Le corps concret: Of bodily and filmic material excess in Philippe Grandrieux’s cinema’, Australian Journal of French Studies, 44(2), pp. 153–171. http://dx.doi.org/10.3828/AJFS.44.2.153.
- Hainge, Greg. (2008) ‘L’Invention du Troisième Peuple: The Utopian vision of Philippe Grandrieux’s dystopias’, in J. West-Sooby (ed.) Nowhere is perfect: French and Francophone utopias/dystopias. Newark, DE: University of Delaware Press, pp. 228–239.
- Hainge, Greg. (2017) Philippe Grandrieux: Sonic Cinema. New York ; London: Bloomsbury Academic (Ex:centrics).
- Ladegaard, Jakob. (2014) ‘Spatial Affects: Body and Space in Philippe Grandrieux’s La Vie nouvelle’, in L. Sætre, P. Lombardo, and J. Zanetta (eds) Exploring text and emotions. Aarhus, Denmark: Aarhus University Press, pp. 151–176.
- Martin, Adrian. (2004) ‘Dance Girl Dance: Philippe Grandrieux’s La Vie nouvelle (The New Life, 2002)’, Kinoeye, 4(3). http://www.kinoeye.org/04/03/martin03.php
- Watkins, Raymond. (2016) ‘Robert Bresson’s Heirs: Bruno Dumont, Philippe Grandrieux, and French Cinema of Sensation’, Quarterly Review of Film and Video, 33(8), pp. 761–776. https://doi.org/10.1080/10509208.2016.1191895.

=== Writing in French ===
- Brenez, Nicole. (ed.) (2005) La vie nouvelle, nouvelle vision: à propos d’un film de Philippe Grandrieux. Paris: Scheer.

=== Writing in German ===
- Morsch, Thomas. (2011) Medienästhetik des Films: verkörperte Wahrnehmung und ästhetische Erfahrung im Kino. Munich: Wilhelm Fink.
- Oxen, Nicolas. (2019) ‘Das sensorische Bild: Instabile Wahrnehmungsrelationen im Kino von Philippe Grandrieux’, in C. Voss, K. Krtilova, and L. Engell (eds) Medienanthropologische Szenen. Leiden, The Netherlands: Brill | Fink, pp. 183–203. Available at: https://doi.org/10.30965/9783770561971_013.
- Stiglegger, Marcus. (2012) ‘Haptische Bilder: Das performative Körperkino von Philippe Grandrieux’, in I. Ritzer and M. Stiglegger (eds) Global Bodies: Mediale Repräsentationen des Körpers. Berlin: Bertz + Fischer, pp. 42–54.
