= Paul Hamy =

French actor

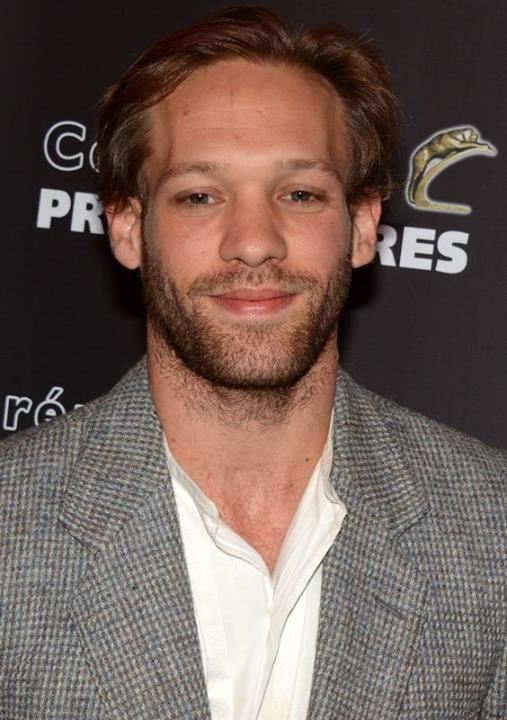
- Paul Hamy at the 2014 Lumière Awards
- Born: 7 January 1982 (age 44); France
- Citizenship: France; United States
- Occupations: Actor, model
- Years active: 1998–present

Paul Hamy (born 7 January 1982) is a French actor and model. He started his career early as a model, working for Elite Model Management before turning to cinema in 2013.

== Career ==
He was spotted at the age of sixteen by fashion photographer Paolo Roversi. He worked with big names like Hedi Slimane for Yves Saint Laurent, Jean-Paul Gaultier, Comme des Garçons, Christian Lacroix, poses for Vogue and travelled all over the world.

He also studied drawing and sculpture and founded “POK - Pain O choKolat”, a collective of visual artists, photographers, designers, videographers, actors, dancers, DJs and musicians. In 2010, he unveiled a series of sculptures under the title Chapeau, Chimère & Forme.

He made his on-screen debut with two movies in 2013 : On My Way directed by Emmanuelle Bercot and Suzanne directed by Katell Quillévéré, for which he was nominated for the César Award for Most Promising Actor and the Lumière Award for Best Male Revelation.

== Life ==
His father is american and his mother french. In September 2020, he married Denitza Stefanova.

== Filmography ==
Year	Title	Role	Director	Notes
2013	Suzanne	Julien	Katell Quillévéré	Nominated - César Award for Most Promising Actor; Nominated - Lumière Award for Best Male Revelation
2013	On My Way	Marco	Emmanuelle Bercot	
2013	Vitalic - Fade Away	Hitman	Romain Chassaing	Music video
2014	Mikado	Goran	Nicolas Peduzzi	Short
2014	Errance	Djé	Peter Dourountzis	Short
2014	La séance	Pierre-Louis Pierson	Edouard de La Poëze	Short
2014	Borgia	Simon d'Auxerre	Christoph Schrewe	TV series (1 episode)
2015	Mon Roi	Pascal	Maïwenn	
2015	Disorder	Denis	Alice Winocour	
2015	French Blood	Grand-Guy	Diastème	
2015	Fort Buchanan	Steve	Benjamin Crotty	
2015	Louis	Louis	Stéphanie Doncker	Short
2015	8 coups	Axel	Virginie Schwartz	Short
2015	Un regret	Him	Thibaut Buccellato	Short
2016	Sex Doll	Cook	Sylvie Verheyde	
2016	Parisienne	Jean-Marc	Danielle Arbid	
2016	Despite the Night	Louis	Philippe Grandrieux	
2016	The Ornithologist	Fernando	João Pedro Rodrigues	
2017	Le divan de Staline	Oleg Iakoblevitch Danilov	Fanny Ardant	
2017	Martin pleure	Voice	Jonathan Vinel	Short
2018	9 doigts	Magloire	F.J. Ossang	
2018	Occidental	Giorgio	Neïl Beloufa	
2018	Le Cri	Munch	Charles Ayats & Sandra Paugam	Short
2018	The Unicorn	Christophe	Chloe Boreham	Short
2019	Sibyl	Étienne	Justine Triet	
2019	Get In	Mickey	Olivier Abbou	
2019	Jessica Forever	Raiden	Caroline Poggi & Jonathan Vinel	
2019	Territory of Love	Olivier	Romain Cogitore	
2019	Someone, Somewhere	Steevy	Cédric Klapisch	
2019	Calls	Maxence	Timothée Hochet	TV series (1 episode)
2021	Villa Caprice	Jérémie	Bernard Stora	
2021	Madame Claude	André	Sylvie Verheyde	
2021	Last Journey of Paul W.R.	Eliott W.R	Romain Quirot	
2021	Maroni	David Le Gall	Olivier Abbou	TV series (6 episodes)
2022	Séparation	Arkhip	Aurélien Achache	Short
2022	Avant la nuit	Franck	Hervé Freiburger	Short
2023	Jusqu'ici tout va bien	Alban	Nawell Madani & Lionel Smila	TV series (6 episodes)
2024	The Soul Eater	Franck de Rolan	Julien Maury & Alexandre Bustillo	Post-Production
2024	Rien ni personne	Jean	Gallien Guibert	Post-Production
TBA	Maoussi		Charlotte Schioler	Post-Production

== Theater ==
Year	Title	Author	Director
2016	Cordelia-Requiescat	Olivier Dhénin	Olivier Dhénin
2016-18	Tilim-Bom Fantaisie	Olivier Dhénin	Olivier Dhénin
2018	Le Tigre bleu de l'Euphrate	Laurent Gaudé	Olivier Dhénin
2022-23	Souvenirs de Combray	Marcel Proust	Olivier Dhénin
