= All About Love (2001 film) =

2001 film by Jean-François Richet

- Film poster
- Directed by: Jean-François Richet
- Written by: Yazid Aït (dialogue); Jean-François Richet
- Produced by: Pascal Caucheteux; Alain Sarde
- Starring: Virginie Ledoyen
- Cinematography: Christophe Beaucarne
- Edited by: Jean-François Richet; Susana Rossberg
- Music by: Bruno Coulais
- Production companies: Why Not Productions; Les Films Alain Sarde
- Distributed by: Mars Distribution
- Release date: 11 April 2001
- Running time: 90 minutes
- Country: France
- Language: French

All About Love (French: De l'amour) is a 2001 French drama film directed by Jean-François Richet. It stars Virginie Ledoyen and Yazid Aït. It was nominated for an award at the 2001 Cairo International Film Festival in 1945.

== Cast ==
- Virginie Ledoyen as Maria
- Yazid Aït as Karim
- Mar Sodupe as Linda
- Stomy Bugsy as Manu
- Jean-François Stévenin as Bertrand, the cop
