= Sombre (film) =

- Directed by: Philippe Grandrieux
- Written by: Sophie Fillières; Philippe Grandrieux; Pierre Hodgson
- Starring: Marc Barbé; Elina Löwensohn
- Music by: Alan Vega
- Release date: 1998
- Running time: 112 min.
- Country: France
- Language: French

Sombre is a 1998 French film directed by Philippe Grandrieux, starring Marc Barbé and Elina Löwensohn. The film was nominated for the Golden Leopard and won the C.I.C.A.E. Award - Special Mention at the Locarno International Film Festival.

== Plot ==
The film deals with Jean (Marc Barbé), a travelling puppeteer and serial killer who follows the Tour de France cycling race in his car and murders women (mostly prostitutes) along his way. Then he meets Claire (Elina Löwensohn), a psychologically troubled and confused woman who falls in love with him.

== Sources ==
- Beugnet, Martine. (2005) ‘Evil and the senses: Philippe Grandrieux’s Sombre and La Vie nouvelle’, Studies in French Cinema, 5(3), pp. 175–184. https://doi.org/10.1386/sfci.5.3.175/1.
- Chamarette, Jenny. (2013) Phenomenology and the future of film: rethinking subjectivity beyond French cinema. Basingstoke: Palgrave Macmillan. [See chapter 5: Threatened Corporealities: Thinking with the Films of Philippe Grandrieux]
- Hainge, Greg. (2017) Philippe Grandrieux: sonic cinema. New York ; London: Bloomsbury Academic (Ex:centrics).
- Rondeau, Corinne. (2001) ‘Sombre, la surface et la chair. A propos d’un film de Philippe Grandrieux’, in Murielle Gagnebin (ed.) Cinéma et inconscient. Seyssel: Champ Vallon, pp. 74–87.
