= Despite the Night =

- Film poster
- French: Malgré la nuit
- Directed by: Philippe Grandrieux
- Written by: Philippe Grandrieux; Bertrand Schefer; Rebecca Zlotowski; John-Henry Butterworth
- Produced by: Catherine Jacques; Stéphanie Morissette; Nicolas Ccomeau
- Starring: Kristian Marr; Ariane Labed; Roxane Mesquida; Paul Hamy
- Cinematography: Jessica Lee Gagné
- Edited by: Françoise Tourmen
- Music by: Ferdinand Grandrieux
- Production companies: Mandrake Films; 1976 Productions
- Distributed by: Shellac
- Release dates: 11 October 2015 (FNC); 6 July 2016 (France)
- Running time: 156 minutes
- Countries: France; Canada
- Languages: French; English

Despite the Night (French: Malgré la nuit) is a 2015 French-Canadian experimental film directed by Philippe Grandrieux.

== Cast ==
- Kristian Marr as Lenz
- Ariane Labed as Hélène
- Roxane Mesquida as Lena
- Paul Hamy as Louis
- Johan Leysen as Vitali
- Sam Louwyck as The man with metallic voice
- Aurélien Recoing as Paul
- Gabrielle Lazure as The mother
- Lola Norda as Lola

== Release ==
The film premiered at the Festival du nouveau cinéma in October 2015. It was screened at the AFI Fest in November 2016.
