= BAC Films =

French film production and distribution company

- Type: Private
- Industry: Film production; Film distribution
- Founded: 1986
- Founder: Jean Labadie; Éric Heumann; Stéphane Sorlat
- Headquarters: Paris, France; Washington, D.C., United States
- Area served: Worldwide
- Key people: David Grumbach (Chairman)
- Owner: Vivendi (10-20%; undermining value capital)
- Parent: BAC Entertainment
- Website: www.bacfilms.com

BAC Films is a French-American film production and distribution company. Based in Paris, the company was founded in 1986 by Jean Labadie, Éric Heumann, and Stéphane Sorlat. Capital shares of the company were re-allocated in 1988 when Vivendi took 10% followed by a 20% stake in the capital of the company, which allowed BAC Films to make major and ambitious acquisitions.

== History ==
BAC Films had an early success in 1990 with Sailor et Lula, a Palme d'Or winner at the Cannes Film Festival. The releases of Barton Fink and Tous les matins du monde in 1991, Indochine and Le Zèbre in 1992, and La Leçon de piano in 1993 placed BAC Films at the top of the independent film distribution industry in France.

In 1994, BAC Films started diversifying its activities with the creation of a movie theater subsidiary named -Les Écrans de Paris, in association with Simon Simsi. In 1997, another movie theater business was created under the name Majestic, and the group underwent a reorganization, splitting into three: BAC Films (distribution); Majestic (movie theaters); and Séance Privée (special events). In 1998, BAC Films set up Mars Films to distribute its numerous acquisitions. Two years later, StudioCanal bought an 80% stake in the company while BAC Films retained management control. It served as the official distribution arm for StudioCanal-produced movies in France.

In 2000, the group was introduced on the stock market under the name BAC Majestic. Two years later, BAC Majestic was affected by the stock market downturn and was forced to give up its movie theater business. StudioCanal helped BAC Films by deciding that they would fully acquire Mars Films and have part-ownership of the film library, while financially supporting the company. In 2003, Millimages took a majority stake in the company. Jean Labadie was ousted in 2007, and Roch Lener succeeded him as chief executive officer.

In October 2013, the company was sold, and David Grumbach was subsequently appointed as its chairman.

BAC Films has distributed more than 500 films, 9 of which received the Palme d'Or at the Cannes Film Festival.

== Titles ==
This is a partial chronological list of films released by BAC in France, with countries of origin and original titles where available:

An asterisk (*) indicates a film distributed by Mars Films.

- Pepi, Luci, Bom et les autres filles du quartier (1980, Spain)
- Il diavolo in corpo (1986, Italy-France)
- My Beautiful Laundrette (1986, UK)
- Double messieurs (1986, France)
- Une flamme dans mon coeur (1987, France-Switzerland)
- Mon bel amour, ma déchirure (1987, France)
- Agent trouble (1987, France)
- Le ventre de l'architecte (1987, UK-Italy)
- Noyade interdite (1987, France-Italy)
- Les saisons du plaisir (1988, France)
- L'âne qui a bu la lune (1988, France)
- Une nuit à l'Assemblée Nationale (1988, France)
- La sorcière sabbat (1988, France-Italy)
- Trois soeurs (1988, France-Italy-West Germany)
- Drowning by Numbers (1988, Netherlands-UK)
- Le sud (1988, Argentina)
- Le maître de musique (1989, Belgium)
- La salle de bain (1989, France)
- La légende du saint buveur (1989, Italy-France)
- Bunker Palace Hôtel (1989, France)
- Le petit diable (1989, Italy)
- Sans espoir de retour (1989, France)
- Les bois noirs (1989, France)
- Les enfants du désordre (1989, France)
- La mahâbhârata (1989, Australia-Belgium-Denmark-Finland-France-Iceland-Ireland-Italy-Japan-Netherlands-Norway-Portugal-Sweden-UK-US)
- Oh! Qu'elles sont noires les nuits sur la mer Noire! (1989, Soviet Union)
- Histoire des garçons et des filles (1989, Italy)
- Monsieur (1990, Belgium-France)
- La voce della luna (1990, Italy)
- Le soleil même la nuit (1990, Italy)
- Sailor et Lula (1990, USA)
- Chicago Joe et la showgirl (1990, UK)
- Fools of Fortune (1990, UK)
- Dancin' thru the Dark (1990, UK)
- Pump Up the Volume (1990, Canada-US)
- L'homme au masque d'or (1991, France)
- Netchaïev est de retour (1991, France)
- L'année de l'éveil (1991, France)
- Hors la vie (1991, France)
- Les ailes de la renommée (1991, Netherlands)
- Jalousie (1991, France)
- Les vies de Loulou (1991, Spain)
- Dans la soirée (1991, Italy)
- A Rage in Harlem (1991, US)
- Barton Fink (1991, US)
- J'embrasse pas (1991, France)
- Le dimanche de préférence (1991, Italy)
- Une brève histoire du temps (1991, Japan-UK-US)
- Annabelle partagée (1991, France)
- Tous les Matins du Monde (1991, France)
- L'affût (1992, France)
- Indochine (1992, France)
- The Crying Game (1992, UK)
- Vincennes Neuilly (1992, France)
- Le zèbre (1992, France)
- Le longue journée se ferme (1992, UK)
- Les Meilleures Intentions (1992, Sweden)
- Stalingrad (1993, Germany)
- L'Œil de Vichy (1993, France)
- The Piano (1993, France-Australia-New Zealand)
- Tout ça... pour ça ! (1993, France)
- Jem'appelle Victor (1993, France)
- loin, si proche! (1993, Germany)
- Le voyage (1993, Argentina)
- The Snapper (1993, Ireland)
- Les marmottes (1993, France)
- Tout le monde n'a pas eu la chance d'avoir des parents communistes (1993, France)
- Short Cuts (1993, US)
- L'homme sans en visage (1993, US)
- Chère Journal intime (1993, France-Italy)
- À la belle étoile (1993, France)
- Le voleur et la menteuse (1994, France)
- Jeanne la Pucelle: 1. Les batailles (1994, France)
- Jeanne la pucelle: 2. Les prisons (1994, France)
- Le parfum d'Yvonne (1994, France)
- L'irrésolu (1994, France)
- La fille de d'Artagnan (1994, France)
- Mrs Parker et le cercle vicieux (1994, US)
- Pulp Fiction (1994, US)
- Clerks : Les Employés modèles (1994, US)
- Veillées d'armes (1994, France)
- Farinelli (1994, Italy-France-Belgium)
- Coups de feu sur Broadway (1994, US)
- Le nouveau monde (1995, France)
- L'Appât (1995, France)
- Les Misérables (1995, France)
- Lisbon Story (1995, France-Germany)
- Les yeux fermés (Con gli occhi chiusi, 1995, Italy)
- Ainsi parlait Bellavista (Così parlò Bellavista, 1995, Italy)
- Un homme sans importance (A Man of No Importance, 1995, UK)
- La Bible de néon (1995, UK)
- Le regard d'Ulysse (To vlemma tou Odyssea, 1995, Greece)
- Nelly et Monsieur Arnaud (1995, France)
- Kids (1995, US)
- Le Bonheur Est Dans le Pré (1995, France)
- Le cercle des amies (Circle of Friends, 1995, Ireland)
- Dead Man (1996, US)
- Gordy (1996, US)
- Mon homme (1996, France)
- Les Grands Ducs (1996, France)
- Beaumarchais (1996, France)
- Chacun cherche son chat (1996, France)
- La seconda volta (1996, Italy)
- Comment je me suis disputé... (ma vie sexuelle) (1996, France)
- Richard III (1996, UK)
- Crash (1996, Canada-France-UK)
- Les Voleurs (1996, France)
- The Van (1996, Ireland)
- Ponette (1996, France)
- Capitaine Conan (1996, France)
- Un air de famille (1996, France)
- Microcosmos: Le peuple de l'herbe (1996, France-Italy-Switzerland)
- Hercule et Sherlock (1996, France)
- Tout le monde dit I love you (Everyone Says I Love You, 1997, US)
- Marion (1997, France)
- Fred (1997, France)
- Donnie Brasco (1997, US)
- Blood & Wine (1997, US)
- Le baiser du serpent (The Serpent's Kiss, 1997, UK)
- James et la pêche géante (James and the Giant Peach, 1997, UK-US)
- City of Crime (City of Industry, 1997, US)
- Ma 6-T va crack-er (1997, France)
- Mauvais genre (1997, France)
- Kama Sutra, une histoire d'amour (Kama Sutra: A Tale of Love, 1997, India-UK-Germany-Japan)
- Mad Dogs (Mad Dog Time, 1997, US)
- She's So Lovely (1997, US)
- Mimic (1997, US)
- Marthe (1997, France)
- Chinese Box (1997, US)
- Sling Blade (1997, US)
- Austin Powers (Austin Powers: International Man of Mystery, 1997, US)
- Le cousin (1997, France)
- Méprise multiple (Chasing Amy, 1997, US)
- La prisonnière espagnole (The Spanish Prisoner, 1998, US)
- Harry dans tous ses états (Deconstructing Harry, 1998, US)
- Wild Man Blues (1998, US)
- Michael Kael contre la World News Company (1998, France)
- Will Hunting (Good Will Hunting, 1998, US)
- Don Juan (1998, France-Germany-Spain)
- Trop (peu) d'amour (1998, France)
- Jackie Brown (1998, US)
- 187: code meurtre (One Eight Seven, 1998, US)
- Ceux qui m'aiment prendront le train (1998, France)
- Aprile (1998, Italy)
- Simples secrets (Marvin's Room, 1998, US)
- La mort du Chinois (1998, France)
- Scream 2 (1998, US)
- Ça n'empêche pas les sentiments (1998, France)
- Jackie Chan dans le Bronx (Hung fan kui, 1998, Hong Kong)
- Le veilleur de nuit (Nightwatch, 1998, US)
- Las Vegas parano (Fear and Loathing in Las Vegas, 1998, US)
- Restons groupés (1998, France)
- Le poulpe (1998, France)
- La vie est belle (La vita è bella, 1998, Italy)
- Alice et Martin (1998, France)
- En plein coeur (1998, France)
- Halloween, 20 ans après (Halloween H20: 20 Years Later, 1998, US)
- Les puissants (The Mighty, 1998, US)
- Les joueurs (Rounders, 1999, US)
- Celebrity (1999, US)
- Pi (1999, US)*
- Shanduraï (L'assedio, 1999, Italy)
- Ça commence aujourd'hui (1999, France)
- Quasimodo d'El Paris (1999, France)
- Cookie's Fortune (1999, US)
- Phoenix Arizona (Smoke Signals, 1999, Canada-US)
- The Lost Son (1999, France-UK)
- Merci mon chien (1999, France)
- The Faculty (1999, US)
- Elle est trop bien (She's All That, 1999, US)
- Studio 54 (54, 1999, US)
- Le projet Blair Witch (The Blair Witch Project, 1999, US)*
- La carte du coeur (Playing by Heart, 1999, US)
- The Naked Man (1999, US)
- Supersens (Senseless, 1999, US)
- L'Anglais (The Limey, 1999, US)
- La Neuvième Porte (The Ninth Gate, 1999, France-Spain-US)
- Ma petite entreprise (1999, France)
- Les enfants du siècle (1999, France)
- Ghost Dog, la voie du samouraï (Ghost Dog: The Way of the Samurai, 1999, France-Germany-Japan-US)
- Une histoire vraie (The Straight Story, 1999, France-UK-US)
- Mrs. Tingle (Teaching Mrs. Tingle, 1999, US)
- Holy Smoke (1999, Australia)
- Himalaya: L'Enfance d'un chef (1999, France-Switzerland-UK)
- Une pour toutes (2000, France)
- Le voyage de Felicia (Felicia's Journey, 2000, Canada-UK)
- Dogma (2000, US)
- Carnivale (2000, France)
- Le dîner (La cena, 2000, Italy)
- Le journal d'Anne Frank (Anne Frank's Diary, 2000, France-Ireland-UK)
- Le talentueux Mr. Ripley (The Talented Mr. Ripley, 2000, US)
- Personne n'est parfait(e) (Flawless, 2000, US)
- L'oeuvre de Dieu, la part du diable (The Cider House Rules, 2000, US)
- La musique de mon coeur (Music of the Heart, 2000, US)
- Les acteurs (2000, France)
- Les enfants du ciel (Bacheha-Ye aseman, 2000, Iran)*
- Là-bas... mon pays (2000, France)
- Il était une fois Jésus (The Miracle Maker, 2000, UK)
- Scream 3 (2000, US)
- Simpatico (2000, France-UK-US)
- Hypnose (Stir of Echoes, 2000, US)*
- Tabou (Gohatto) (2000, Japan)
- On fait comme on a dit (2000, France)
- À la verticale de l'été (Mùa hè chieu thang dung, 2000, Vietnam)*
- Piège fatal (Reindeer Games, 2000, US)
- Jet Set (2000, France)
- Buena Vista Social Club (2000, Cuba-France-Germany-US)*
- Gangsta cop (In Too Deep, 2000, US)
- Les frères Soeur (2000, France)
- Le coeur à l'ouvrage (2000, France)
- In Love (Down to You, 2000, US)
- Amazone (2000, France)
- Blood Simple (2000, US)*
- Siam Sunset (2000, Australia)
- Cecil B. Demented (2000, US)
- Furia (2000, France)
- Le sens des affaires (2000, France)
- O'Brother (O Brother, Where Art Thou?, 2000, France-UK-US)
- Le choix d'une vie (A Walk on the Moon, 2000, Australia-US)*
- U-571 (2000, France-US)
- Esther Kahn (2000, France-UK)
- Scary Movie (2000, US)
- Bread and Roses (2000, US)*
- The Yards (2000, US)
- Ça ira mieux demain (2000, France)
- L'ombre du vampire (Shadow of the Vampire, 2000, Luxembourg-UK-US)
- Aniki, mon frère (Brother, 2000, Japan-UK-US)
- Billy Elliot (2000, UK)*
- Hamlet (2000, US)
- Sexy Beast (2001, UK-Spain)
- Animal Factory (2001, US)
- The man who cried - Les larmes d'un homme (The Man Who Cried, 2001, France-UK)*
- Ce que veulent les femmes (What Women Want, 2001, US)
- Barnie et ses petites contrariétés (2001, France)
- Adieu Babylone (2001, France)*
- Le chocolat (Chocolat, 2001, UK-US)
- Traffic (2001, US)
- Les morsures de l'aube (2001, France)
- Intimité (Intimacy, 2001, UK)
- Belphégor - Le fantôme du Louvre (2001, France)
- De l'amour (2001, France)
- Le roman de Lulu (2001, France)
- Un amour infini (Bounce, 2001, US)
- Mon père, il m'a sauvé la vie (2001, France)
- Highlander: Endgame (2001, US)
- Dracula 2001 (Dracula 2000, 2001, US)
- Insomnies (Chasing Sleep, 2001, US)
- La Chambre du fils (La stanza del Figlio, 2001, France-Italy)
- Un aller simple (2001, France)
- All the Little Animals, (2001, UK)*
- Capitaine Corelli (Captain Corelli's Mandolin, 2001, France-UK-US)
- Malèna (2001, Italy)*
- Panic (2001, US)
- Boys and Girls (2001, US)
- Spy Kids (2001, US)
- Scary Movie 2 (2001, US)
- Le centre du monde (The Center of the World, 2001, US)*
- Le bon numéro (Lucky Numbers, 2001, France-US)
- Kevin & Perry (Kevin & Perry Go Large, 2001, UK)
- Cercle intime (The Monkey's Mask, 2001, Australia-France-Italy-Japan)
- Absolument fabuleux (2001, France)
- Human Nature (2001, France-US)
- Chaos (2001, France)
- Le journal de Bridget Jones (Bridget Jones's Diary, 2001, France-UK-US)*
- Le Vélo de Ghislain Lambert (2001, France)
- The barber: l'homme qui n'était pas là (The Man Who Wasn't There, 2001, UK-US)
- Mulholland Drive (2001, France-US)
- Le sortilège du scorpion de Jade (2001, US)
- Le Peuple migrateur (2001, France-Germany-Italy)
- Les Autres (The Others, 2001, France-Italy-Spain-US)
- Christmas ('R Xmas, 2001, US)*
- B. Monkey (2002, UK-US)
- Laissez-passer (2002, France)
- That Love (Cet amour-là, 2002, France)
- Le métier des armes (Il mestiere delle armi, 2002, Italy)
- Un amour à New York (Serendipity, 2002, US)*
- Mischka (2002, France)
- Ali (2001, US)
- Monsieur Batignole (2002, France)
- Le frère du guerrier (2002, France)
- Gosford Park (2002, UK)*
- Kate et Léopold (Kate & Leopold, 2002, US)
- Nous étions soldats (We Were Soldiers, 2002, Germany-US)
- Trois zéros (2002, France)
- Une affaire privée (2002, France)
- Irréversible (2002, France)*
- Ghost World (2002, US)*
- In the Bedroom (2002, US)
- Jeepers creepers - Le chant du diable (Jeepers Creepers, 2002, Germany-US)
- Lantana (2002, Australia)
- Bruiser (2002, France)
- Le poids de l'eau (The Weight of Water, 2002, France-US)
- Joe Gould's Secret (2002, US)
- La vie promise (2002, France)
- 11'09"01: Onze minutes, neuf secondes, un cadre (11'09"1 September 11, 2002, Africa-Bosnia-Egypt-France-India-Iran-Israel-Japan-Mexico-UK-US)
- Callas Forever (2002, France-Italy-Romania-Spain-UK)
- Le Pianiste (The Pianist, 2002, France-Germany-Poland-UK)
- Décalage horaire (2002, France-UK)
- Pour un garçon (About a Boy, 2002, France-UK-US)*
- Aram (2002, France)
- All or Nothing (2002, France-UK)
- Ali G (Ali G Indahouse, 2002, UK)*
- La Cité de Dieu (Cidade de Deus, 2003, Brazil)*
- Adaptation. (2003, US)
- Le Cœur des hommes (2003, France)
- Le chemin de la liberté (Rabbit-Proof Fence, 2003, Australia)
- L'importance d'être constant (The Importance of Being Earnest, 2003, UK-US)
- Interstella 5555: The 5tory of the 5ecret 5tar 5ystem (2003, France-Japan)
- Darkness (2003, Spain-US)
- Un Américain bien tranquille (The Quiet American, 2003, Germany-US)
- Anything Else (2003, US)
- Zatoichi (2003, Japan)
- Le club des frustrées (Crush, 2003, Germany-UK)
- La Prophétie des grenouilles (2003, France)
- L'hirondelle d'or (Da zui xia, 2004, Hong Kong)
- Horus, prince du soleil (Taiyô no ôji: Horusu no daibôken, 2004, Japan)
- La Planète bleue (Deep Blue, 2004, Germany-UK)
- Coffee and Cigarettes (2004, Italy-Japan-US)
- La vie est un miracle! (Zivot je cudo, 2004, Serbia)
- 2 soeurs (Janghwa, Hongryeon, 2004, South Korea)
- La terre qui pleure (Trilogia: To livadi pou dakryzei, 2004, Greece)
- Lady Chance (The Cooler, 2004, US)
- Old Boy (Oldeuboi, 2004, South Korea)
- Genesis (2004, France-Italy)
- Samaria (2004, South Korea)
- La Demoiselle d'honneur (2004, France-Germany-Italy)
- Rois et Reine (2004, France)
- L'autre rive (Undertow, 2005, US)
- Les tortues volent aussi (Lakposhtha parvaz mikonand, 2005, France-Iraq)
- Crustacés et Coquillages (2005, France)
- Douches froides (2005, France)
- Broken Flowers (2005, US)
- Bataille dans le ciel (Batalla en el cielo, 2005, France-Germany-Mexico)
- La mort de Dante Lazarescu (Moartea domnului Lãzãrescu, 2006, Romania)
- La Véritable Histoire du Petit Chaperon rouge (Hoodwinked!, 2006, US)
- La Planète blanche (The White Planet, 2006 Canada-France)
- Transamerica (2006, US)
- Le Caïman (Il caimano, 2006, France-Italy)
- Reeker (2006, US)
- Tideland (2006, Canada-UK)
- L'immeuble Yacoubian (Omaret yakobean, 2006, Egypt)
- Shortbus (2006, US)
- The Last Show (A Prairie Home Companion, 2006, US)
- Les Chanons d'Amour (2007, France)
- Caramel (Sukkar banat, 2007, Lebanon)
- 4 mois, 3 semaines, 2 jours (4 luni, 3 săptămâni şi 2 zile, 2007, Romania)
- Lumière silencieuse (Stellet Licht, 2007, France-Germany-Mexico-Netherlands)
- Survivre avec les Loups (2008, Belgium-France-Germany)
- La ronde de nuit (Nightwatching, 2008, Canada-Netherlands-Poland-UK)
- Chasseurs de dragons (2008, France)
- Un conte de Noël (2008, France)
- Shrooms (2008, Ireland)
- La loose (The Wackness, 2008, US)
- Niko, le petit renne (Niko – Lentäjän poika, 2008, Finland)
- La Vague (Die Welle, 2009, Germany)
- The Reader (2009, Germany-US)
- Méres et Filles (Hidden Diary, 2009, Canada-France)
- Les Vies privées de Pippa Lee (The Private Lives of Pippa Lee, 2009, US)
- Disgrace (2010, Australia)
- Fleur du désert (Desert Flower, 2010, Germany)
- La Comtesse (2010, France)
- Eyes of War (Triage, 2010, France-Ireland-Spain)
- Be Bad! (Youth in Revolt, 2010, US)
- Welcome to the Rileys (2010, UK-US)
- Blackthorn, La Dernière Chevauchée de Butch Cassidy (Blackthorn, 2011, Bolivia-France-Spain-UK)
- Nuit blanche (2011, Belgium-France-Luxembourg)
- Americano (2011, France)
- Et si on vivait tous ensemble? (2012, France-Germany)
- Trishna (2012, India-Sweden-UK)
- Después de Lucía (2012, France-Mexico)
- Niko, le petit renne 2 (2012, Denmark-Finland-Germany-Ireland)
- Survivre (Djúpið, 2013, Iceland)
- Electrick Children (2013, US)
- Northwest (Nordvest, 2013, Denmark)
- Oggy et les Cafards: Le Film (Oggy and the Cockroaches: The Movie, 2013, France)
- White Bird (2014, France-US)
- Les Opportunistes (Il capitale umano, 2014, France-Italy)
- Snow Therapy (Turist, 2015, Sweden)
- Hungry Hearts (2015, Italy)
- Furyo (Merry Christmas, Mr. Lawrence, 2015, Japan-UK)
- Every Thing Will Be Fine (2015, Canada-France-Germany-Sweden)
- The Duke of Burgundy (2015, UK)
- Daddy Cool (Infinitely Polar Bear, 2015, US)
- La Volante (2015, France)
- Taj Mahal (2015, France)
- Le Grand Jeu (2015, France)
- Arrête ton cinéma (2016, France)
- Free Love (Freeheld, 2016, US)
- Soleil de Plomb (Zvizdan, 2016, Croatia)
- Green Room (2016, US)
- Folles de Joie (La Pazza Gioia, 2016, Italy)
- L'été de Kikujiro (Kikujirô no natsu, 2016, Japan)
- Mademoiselle (Agassi, 2016, South Korea)
- Hedi, un vent de liberté (Inhebek Hedi, 2016, Belgium-France-Tunisia)
- Jackie (2017, US)
- Les Oubliés (Under sandet, 2017, Denmark-Germany)
- Ava (2017, France)
- The Square (2017, Denmark-France-Germany-Sweden)
- L'échappée belle (The Leisure Seeker, 2018, France-Italy)
- Jersey Affair (Beast, 2018, UK)
- Joueurs (2018, France)
- Under the Tree (Undir trénu, 2018, Iceland)
- Frères ennemis (2018, Belgium-France)
- Leto (2018, Russia)
- Un grand voyage vers la nuit (Di qiu zui hou de ye wan, 2019, China-France)
- Funan (2019, France)
- Terra Willy, Planète Inconnue (Astro Kid, 2019, France)
- Factory (Zavod, 2019, Russia)
- Mon frère (2019, France)
- Alice and the Mayor (2019, France)
- Little Joe (2019, Austria)
- Weathering with You (2020, Japan)
- Cuties (2020, France)
- Villa Caprice (2020, France)
- The man who sold his skin (2020, Tunisia)
- Yakari, A Spectacular Journey (2020)
- Valiant Hearts (Cœurs vaillants, 2021, France-Belgium)
