= Philippe Grandrieux =

French film director and screenwriter (born 1954)

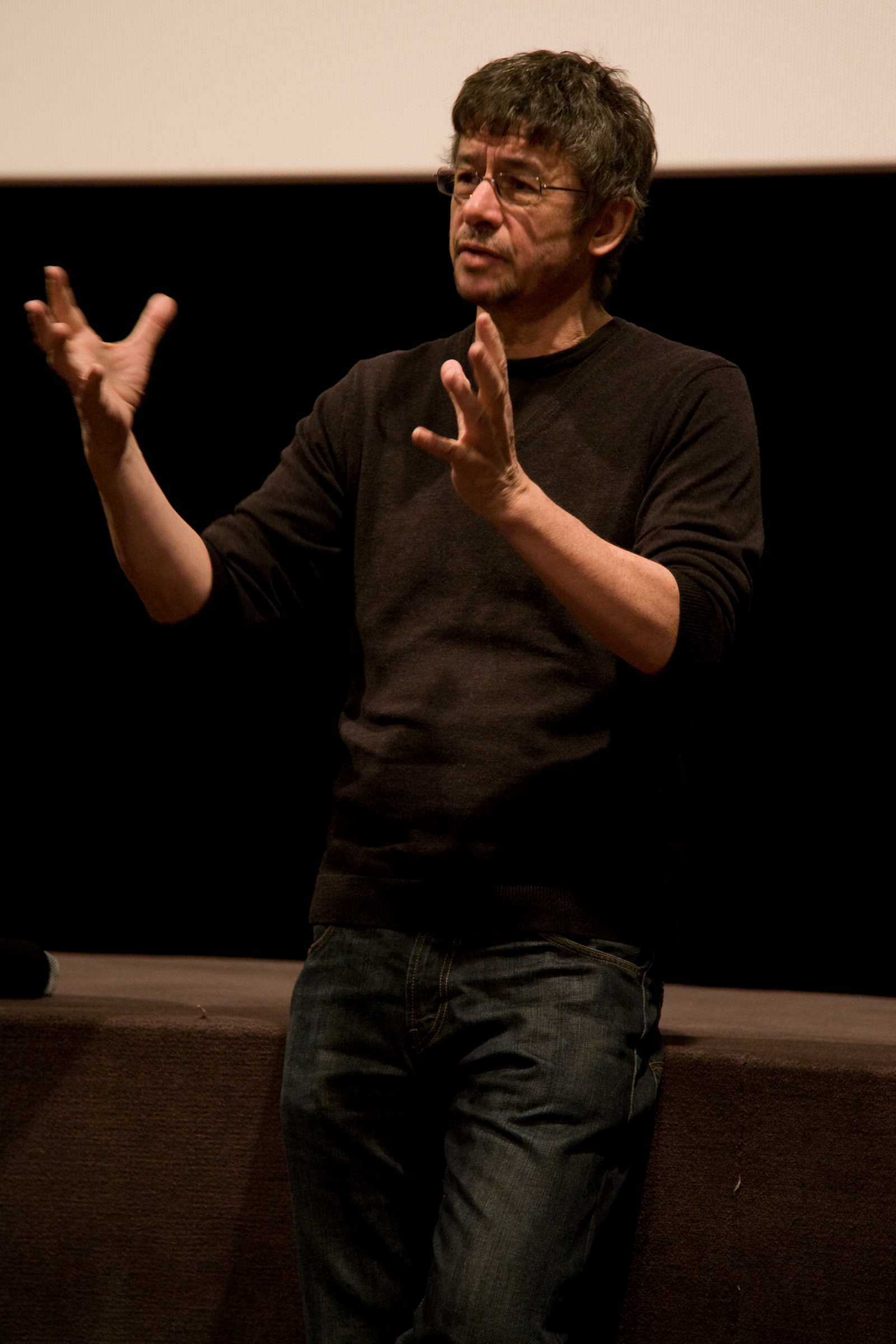
- Grandrieux presenting Sombre in Paris in 2009
- Born: 1954 (age 71–72); Saint-Étienne, France
- Occupations: Film director screenwriter

Philippe Grandrieux (born in 1954) is a French film director and screenwriter. He studied film at the INSAS (Institut National Supérieur des Arts du Spectacle) in Belgium. In 1976, he exhibited his first video work at Galerie Albert Baronian, Bruxelles.

He works in several areas of kinetic visual arts, including: television experiments, feature films, documentaries, performance, installation, staging.

== Work ==
=== Television experiments ===
In the 1980s, he worked in collaboration with the French Institut national de l'audiovisuel (INA) and the television channel La Sept/Arte where he helped develop new cinematographic forms and formats that reconsider some basic principles of film writing such as the conventions behind documentary, information and film essays. In 1990, he created the “Live” film research laboratory, which produced one-hour-long sequences by Robert Kramer, Robert Frank, Thierry Kuntzel, Nick Waplington, Dominique Dubosc, Daniele Incalcaterra, Christian Argentino, Lasse Naukkarinen among others.

=== Feature films ===
In 1998, his first feature Sombre won the Special Jury Prize at the Locarno Film Festival. Starring Elina Lowensohn and Marc Barbé.

In 2002, A New Life premiered at the Toronto International Film Festival. Starring Zach Knighton, Anna Mouglalis, Marc Barbé and Zsolt Nagy.

In 2008, A Lake screened at the 65th Venice Film Festival. It won a Special Mention in the Orizzonti Section which rewards movies that initiate new cinematographic trends. With Dmitry Kubasov, Natalie Rehorova, Alexei Solonchev.

In 2016, Despite The Night, with Christian Marr, Ariane Labed, Roxane Mesquida, Paul Hamy, Aurélien Recoing, was premiered at the Rotterdam International Film Festival. The film was also at Critics' Week during the Berlinale, at Film Comment Selects - Lincoln Center - New York.

In 2018, Grandrieux directed La Lumière, la lumière, a segment of the anthology film Liminal including three other short films from Lav Diaz, Manuel de Laborde, and Oscar Enriquez. The proposal was to play on the poetic affinities between cinema and music. Liminal was commissioned by FICUNAM and UNAM. With Camille Grandrieux and Lola Norda.

Grandrieux prepares a new feature film Marcus, from a screenplay co-written with Jonathan Littell.

=== Video clip ===
In 2007 Marilyn Manson asked Grandrieux to direct the video for the song "Putting Holes in Happiness" from his album Eat Me, Drink Me.

=== Documentary ===
His last documentary It May Be That Beauty Has Strengthened Our Resolve - Masao Adachi won in 2011 the New:Vision Award at CPH:DOX - Copenhagen, in 2012 the Great Experimental Prize at Festival Côté Court - Pantin, France and in 2013 The Great Prize For Documentary at the Tripoli Film Festival - Lebanon. This film was previewed at the Cinémathèque Française, at the Centre Pompidou, at Fid Marseille (international selection) and then in more than 40 festivals.

=== Films, performances, installations ===
In 2012 Grandrieux started a work inspired by the concept of «the bare life» from the philosopher Giorgio Agamben. Each movement, White Epilepsy, Meurtrière and Unrest, is a film and a performance with dancers. Each film was presented for the first time at FID Marseille (international or national competition). This work (performances or films) was also presented at the Whitney Museum of American Art, the Radcliffe Institute - Harvard University, the University of Chicago, Centre Pompidou-Metz, ICI-CCN - Montpellier, and CCN - Le Havre.

In 2019, The Empty Gallery (Hong Kong) presented the exhibition "The Bare Life" with the trilogy White Epilepsy, Meurtrière, Unrest, and The Scream, an installation of eleven projections.

=== Staging and videos ===
In May and June 2023, his staging and videos for Richard Wagner’s opera Tristan and Isolde were presented at the Opera Ballet Vlaanderen in Antwerp and Ghent (Belgium), then in June 2024 at the Opéra de Rouen, France.

=== Teaching ===
2012 / 2013: Visiting Fiction Film Professor at Harvard University

Occasionally: La Femis (Paris), Beaux-Arts (Marseille), Head (Genève)

=== Fellowship ===
2015–2016: Radcliffe-Harvard Film Study Center Fellow / David and Roberta Logie Fellow at the Radcliffe Institute for Advanced Study, Harvard University.

== Awards ==
1983 Juste une Image (about the new images - 9 x 55’) co-author with Louisette Neil and Thierry Garrel
- Grand Prix Scam

1983 Pleine Lune ("soirée thématique" 180’) co-author with Jérôme Prieur and Thierry Kuntzel
- Prix de l’Association française des critiques de télévision

1998 Sombre (feature 112')
- Festival de Locarno: Special Mention of the jury

2009 Un lac (feature 90')
- 65th Mostra of Venice Orizzonti: Special Mention of the jury

2009 Un lac (feature 90')
- International Film Festival of Las Palmas: Best Photography + Special Mention for Innovation

2016 Meurtrière (film - installation 59')
- Festival du nouveau cinéma de Montréal: Prix FNC LAB
- Festival FilMadrid: Mention spéciale du jury

2011 It May Be That Beauty Has Strengthened Our Resolve - Masao Adachi (documentary 74')
- CPH:DOX Copenhagen Documentary Film Festival, Danemark: «New:Vision Award» (2011)

- Festival Côté Court, Pantin, France: Great Experimental Prize (2012)

- Tripoli Festival, Liban: Great Prize For Documentary «Cultural Resistance» (2013)

== Solo Retrospectives ==
Since 2005, programs devoted to Grandrieux's features (including Sombre, La Vie nouvelle, Un lac, and Malgré la nuit), installations, documentary work and shorts have been presented across the world.

2005: «Philippe Grandrieux» États généraux du film documentaire, Lussas, France

2007: «Breathless, French New New Wave» Australian Cinematheque, Gallery of Modern Art, Brisbane, Australia

2008: «Extreme Love, around Philippe Grandrieux» Uplink, Tokyo

2008: «Philippe Grandrieux» Tate Modern, London, as part of "Paradise Now! Essential French Avant-Garde cinema 1890-2008». With A New Life (La Vie nouvelle), The Late Season (L'Arrière-saison), the video clip Putting Holes in Happiness and an extract from A Lake (Un lac).

2009: «Ciclo Philippe Grandrieux» International Film Festival of Guadalajara, Mexico

2009: «Ciclo Philippe Grandrieux» Cineteca Nacional, Mexico

2009: «Ciclo Philippe Grandrieux» Belo Horizonte and São Paulo, Brazil

2009: «Ciclo Philippe Grandrieux» International Film Festival of Cali, Colombia

2009: «All about Philippe Grandrieux» CPH:DOX International Film Festival of Copenhagen, Denmark

2010: «Film Comment Selects: Philippe Grandrieux» Lincoln Center, New York, USA

2010: «Philippe Grandrieux» Harvard Film Archive, Cambridge, USA

2010: «Philippe Grandrieux» International Film Festival of Las Palmas, Spain

2011: «World Cinema Now» Monash University, Melbourne, Australia

2012: «Philippe Grandrieux Artist in Focus» Courtisane, Gent, Belgium

2012: «Hommage» organisé par la revue Hors Champ et la Cinémathèque Québécoise, dans le cadre du Festival du nouveau cinéma, Montreal

2013: «Carte Blanche à Philippe Grandrieux» Whitney Museum of American Art, New York, US. With the film White Epilepsy and the performance piece Meurtrière (world premiere).

2016: «Philippe Grandrieux Artist in Focus» 17th Jeonju IFF, South Korea

2017: «Philippe Grandrieux» Milan

2017: «Philippe Grandrieux» Seville

2017: «Philippe Grandrieux Tribute» Thessaloniki

2017: «Philippe Grandrieux» ACFK Uherské Hradiště, Czech Republic

2019: White Epilepsy, Meurtrière, Unrest as well as The Scream, an installation of eleven projections, have been presented at the Empty Gallery/Hong Kong in a solo exhibition entitled The Bare Life.

2019: «Cinéma d’avant-garde: Philippe Grandrieux» Cinémathèque française, Paris. With Sombre, La Vie nouvelle, Un lac, Malgré la nuit, White Epilepsy, Meurtrière, Unrest and L'Arrière-saison.

2023: «Rétrospective Philippe Grandrieux» La Filmothèque du quartier Latin, Paris

2025 «Philippe Grandrieux: An American Cinematheque Retrospective»

== Scripts ==
1998 Sombre / Written in collaboration with Pierre Hogdson et Sophie Fillière

1999 Karain / Adaptation of Karain, The Tales of Unrest by Joseph Conrad

2002 A New Life (La Vie nouvelle) / Written in collaboration with Éric Vuillard

2008 A Lake (Un Lac)

2010 The Killing Room / Written in collaboration with Geoff Cox

2012 Beyond The Night (Malgré la nuit) / Written in collaboration with Bertrand Schefer, Rebeca Zlotowski et John-Henry Butterworth

2022 Marcus / Written in collaboration with Jonathan Littell

== Bibliography ==
Texts about Philippe Grandrieux (extracts)

Le cinéma de Philippe Grandrieux : un dispositif de transe? Milena Escobar, thèse de doctorat Aix-Marseille Université, 2022

Philippe Grandrieux, Sonic Cinema, by Greg Hainge, Bloomsbury Publishing, 2016, 300p.

Rêverie d’un filmeur solitaire par Serge Kaganski, Les Inrockuptibles n°1075, 2016

État des corps Malgré la nuit, Raymond Bellour, Trafic n° 98, P.O.L, 2016

Grandrieux dans le flou des corps by Guillaume de Sardes, ed. Prussian Blue # 4, p. 52 -57, 2013

Philippe Grandrieux de la pulsion à la grâce by John Jefferson Selve, Possession Immédiate, # 2, p. 62 - 83, 2015

Cinema and Agamben: Ethics, Biopolitics and the Moving Image, Henrik Gustafsson and Asbjoorn Gronstad - Engaging Hand to Hand with the Moving Image: Serra, Viola and Grandrieux's Radical Gestures, ed. Bloomsbury Publishing, 2014

Phenomenology and the Future of Film: Rethinking Subjectivity beyond French Cinema, Jenny Chamarette. Threatened Corporealities: Thinking the Films of Philippe Grandrieux, ed. Palgrave Macmillian, 2012

Le Futur antérieur, Raymond Bellour, Trafic, n° 70, P.O.L, 2009

Le Corps concrêt, Greg Hainge : «Of Bodily and Filmic Material Excess in Philippe Grandrieux’s Cinema.», ed. Monash University, Melbourne, 2008

Cinema and Sensation: French Film and the Art of Transgression, Martine Beugnet, ed. Edinburgh University, 2007

L’Au-delà des images, Christa Blümlinger, Parachute n° 123, Montreal, 2006

La Vie nouvelle/nouvelle Vision, à propos d’un film de Philippe Grandrieux, sous la direction de Nicole Brenez. With texts by: Jonathan Rosenbaum, Raymond Bellour, Nicole Brenez, Sothean Nhieim, Fabien Gaffez, Serge Kaganski Augustin Gimel, Lionel Soukaz, Adrian Martin, Vincent Amiel, Peter Tscherkassky... This publication includes a DVD of the film La Vie nouvelle (A New Life), Éditions Leo Scheer, Paris, 2005

Holly Terror: Philippe Grandrieux «Sombre», Adrian Martin, ed. Senses Of Cinema, 1999

Pour Sombre, Raymond Bellour, Trafic, n° 28, P.O.L, 1998

== Publications ==
Texts by Philippe Grandrieux (extracts)

Two drawings and one text for Médéa by Stephan Crasneanscki, Libraryman Editions, 2024

En vrac, Mettray, ed. Didier Morin, 2022

Troubles, Mettray, ed. Didier Morin, 2021

Au bord d’un lac : Qu’est-ce que le réel ? Des cinéastes prennent position, dir. Andréa Picard, ed. Post-éditions - Cinéma du réel, 2018

Journal de tournage, Malgré la nuit (1ère partie), Trafic, n° 98, ed. P.O.L, été 2016

Journal de tournage, Malgré la nuit (2èrme partie), Mettray, ed. Didier Morin, 2016

Philippe Grandrieux à propos d’Ariane Labed, Possession Immédiate, # 3, p 62. 2015

La Première image, un texte écrit à l’occasion de la parution du n° 700 des Cahiers du cinéma, 2014

Congo, Trafic n° 83, P.O.L, automne 2012

Les Morts, Trafic n° 84, P.O.L, hiver 2012

À quoi bon une image, Le cinéma critique, de l’argentique au numérique, voies et formes de l’objection visuelle : Sorbonne Université Presses, 2010

Sous le ciel de Dwoskin, Trafic n° 76, ed. P.O.L, hiver 2010

Bad Lieutnant d’Abel Ferrara, a text by Philippe Grandrieux, commissioned by Nicole Brenez for the booklet of the DVD edition of Bad Lieutnant, 2005

Correspondance sur La Vie nouvelle, Philippe Grandrieux et Éric Vuillard, Trafic n° 44, P.O.L, hiver 2002

L’Emprise, Trafic n° 38, ed. P.O.L., été 2001

Sur l’horizon insensé du cinéma, Cahiers du cinéma, hors-série, novembre 2000

Incendie, Trafic n° 16, ed. P.O.L., autome 1995

One Summer, Livraison n°4 Open Landscapes – Closed rooms, 2009–2010, p. 174, 175, 186
