= Cold Water (film) =

Cold Water (L'eau froide)
- Directed by: Olivier Assayas
- Written by: Olivier Assayas
- Produced by: Georges Benayoun
- Starring: Virginie Ledoyen; Cyprien Fouquet; Jackie Berroyer
- Cinematography: Denis Lenoir
- Edited by: Luc Barnier
- Music by: Marie Guesnier
- Distributed by: Pan-Européenne Distribution
- Release dates: May 17, 1994 (Cannes); July 6, 1994 (France)
- Running time: 92 minutes
- Country: France
- Language: French
- Box office: $185,917

Cold Water (French: L'eau froide) is a 1994 French film written and directed by Olivier Assayas about two troubled teenagers in France during the 1970s. The film was screened in the Un Certain Regard section at the 1994 Cannes Film Festival.

In October 2007, it was screened at the Pacific Film Archive in Berkeley, California, where Assayas spent a week in residence introducing and discussing his films with the audiences there. He was accompanied by his friend Jean-Michel Frodon, the current director of the journal Cahiers du cinéma, of which Assayas was once the director. Assayas said the film is autobiographical, reflecting upon his own teenage years. He went out of his way to cast actors who were not professionals or who, as in the case of male lead Cyprien Fouquet (playing Gilles), had never acted before, although female lead Virginie Ledoyen (playing Christine) had appeared in several films. The film was the result of a commission from French TV, which wanted a 52-minute film but allowed Assayas to make a longer version, after some negotiations.

== Plot ==
Gilles and Christine are teenagers from unstable homes. When they do some shop-lifting together she is arrested, but he gets away. She escapes from a mental institution and meets him at an abandoned house in the country, where a large group of rebellious teenagers are having a wild, all-night party. American rock music from the period is played prominently and has a very strong effect, especially "Me and Bobby McGee," sung by Janis Joplin. Drugs are used, mainly pot and hash. As the party is winding down, Gilles and Christine escape even deeper into the countryside, searching for a commune where artists are said to live without electricity or running water. This is Christine's idea, but Gilles reluctantly goes along. A jolting conclusion shows us that, as Assayas puts it, "Gilles' real life has now begun."

== Cast ==
- Virginie Ledoyen - Christine
- Cyprien Fouquet - Gilles
- László Szabó - Gilles's father
- Jean-Pierre Darroussin - Inspector
- Jackie Berroyer - Christine's father
- Dominique Faysse - Christine's mother
- Smaïl Mekki - Mourad
- Jean-Christophe Bouvet - Professor
- Ilona Györi - Marie
- Renée Amzallag - The nurse
- Jérôme Simonin - Vendeur de dynamite
- Laetitia Lemerle - Corrine
- Alexandra Yonnet - Copine blouson
- Caroline Doron - Copine blessée
- Laetitia Giraud - Christiane
