= Ma 6-T va crack-er =

1997 film directed by Jean-François Richet

- Directed by: Jean-François Richet
- Written by: Jean-François Richet; Arco Descat C.
- Starring: Arco Descat C. Gilles Carballo; Hamouda Bouras
- Cinematography: Valérie Le Gurun
- Edited by: Jean-François Richet
- Music by: White & Spirit
- Production companies: Why Not Productions; Actes Prolétariens; La Sept Cinéma
- Distributed by: BAC Films
- Release date: July 2, 1997
- Running time: 105 minutes
- Country: France
- Language: French

Ma 6-T va crack-er (Standard French: Ma cité va craquer, English translation: My suburbs are Going to Crack, derived from craquer ("break down") and the drug crack cocaine) is a French movie directed by Jean-François Richet in 1997, caricaturing gang warfare. Richet explicitly made in an interview references to Marxism-Leninism as his ideology to produce this movie.

This influence is strong in one dialog where the teenagers say that a workers' strike is "more powerful against the system" than a ghetto riot. Also, the lyrics of 2Bal2Neg anthem "La Sédition" that we can hear at the end of movie speaks about "class struggle against the bourgeois class" and "a vanguard party founded to overthrow the society".

== Setting ==
The story is set in a cité (6-T in French slang), or housing project, in the Parisian suburb of Meaux. The residents are unhappy about their living conditions and are rebelling against this. Some critics compare it to the film La Haine, directed by Mathieu Kassovitz and starring Vincent Cassel, as well as to Le Cercle de la haine.

== Cast ==
- Arco Descat C.: Arco
- Jean-Marie Robert: J.M.
- Malik Zeggou: Malik
- Mustapha Ziad: Mustapha
- Hamouda Bouras: Hamouda
- Jean-François Richet: Djeff
- Virginie Ledoyen: The girl with a gun
- Brigitte Sy: The director
- Emil Abossolo-Mbo: The gym teacher
- Mystik: Rap singer
- Stomy Bugsy

== Impact of the film ==
French rap did well in the early 90s in France because of its rebellious lyrical content. It is used to illustrate the link between the reality and the atmosphere of this film, and to incite reflection in the viewer.

Artists such as IAM, X-Men, Assassin, KRS-One, 2 Bal, Mystik and more feature on the soundtrack, supporting Jean-François Richet's cinematography.

== See also ==
- 2005 civil unrest in France
- List of hood films
