= The Ornithologist (film) =

2016 film directed by João Pedro Rodrigues

- Film poster
- O Ornitólogo
- Directed by: João Pedro Rodrigues
- Written by: João Pedro Rodrigues; Joao Rui Guerra da Mata
- Produced by: João Figueiras; Diogo Varela Silva
- Starring: Paul Hamy
- Cinematography: Rui Poças
- Edited by: Raphaël Lefèvre
- Music by: Séverine Ballon
- Production companies: Black Maria; House on Fire; Itaca Films
- Distributed by: Nitrato Filmes (Portugal); Épicentre Films (France)
- Release dates: 8 August 2016 (Locarno); 20 October 2016 (Portugal); 30 November 2016 (France)
- Running time: 117 minutes
- Countries: Portugal; France; Brazil
- Languages: Portuguese; English; Mandarin; Mirandese; Latin
- Box office: $74,714

The Ornithologist (Portuguese: O Ornitólogo) is a 2016 drama film directed by João Pedro Rodrigues. It was released in 2016.

The film stars Paul Hamy as Fernando, an ornithologist studying black storks in Portugal, who is drawn into a series of incidents paralleling the life of Saint Anthony of Padua, known to the Portuguese as Anthony of Lisbon.

Director João Pedro Rodrigues has described his film as a "purposefully transgressive and blasphemous reappropriation of the saint’s life".

== Plot ==
Fernando is an ornithologist birdwatching in the wild along a river in Portugal. Observing birds through binoculars from his kayak, he becomes so engrossed in the birds that he is caught unawares when his kayak is swept downstream into rough rapids, where he loses control and capsizes.

Two Chinese girls Fei and Lin are hiking through the woods, lost on their pilgrimage to the tomb of Saint James in Santiago da Compostela in Spain. They discover Fernando's body and resuscitate him. The three of them manage to communicate in English. He explains that they are in Portugal near the Spanish border, far off their route. They want him to accompany them to Santiago but he plans to head in the other direction to reach the place he left his car. They explain they are afraid of forest spirits and the devil while he asserts such things do not exist. He puts off discussion until morning and they give him a specially formulated tea to help him sleep, promising he will wake restored.

He awakes to find out he was drugged and is now tightly bound with ropes attached to the bough of a tree in an upright position. The girls ignore his pleas and promises of help; the consider him evil and plan to castrate him the next day. During the next night he frees himself and leaves quietly with some supplies. He climbs high up a cliff but is still unable to contact help by cell phone.

Fernando locates half of his kayak along the river, and then discovers the other half has been erected as a sort of totem surrounded by a circle of thin poles with white balloons attached. He decides Fei and Lin were not wrong to believe they were not alone in the forest. At night he observes the traditional rituals of local tribal men dancing and drinking in the dark and slaughtering a boar.

Continuing through the forest in daylight, Fernando comes upon a goatherd. The herder is a deaf mute named Jesus, who manages his small herd with just a small dog and a whistle. He shares some of his food and water with Fernando, then strips and jumps in the river. He soon gets Fernando to join him and they frolic like carefree children. They sunbathe on the shore and Fernando shows Jesus how his binoculars work. They make love rolling over each other across the sand. As they prepare to leave, Fernando sees that Jesus is putting on the brown hooded sweatshirt he left behind when fleeing Fei and Lin. Fernando confronts him and Jesus panics and pulls out his knife. The ensuing fight over the knife ends with Jesus dead of a stab wound in his right side. Fernando washes the bloodied sweatshirt and wears it and Jesus' whistle from then on.

Fernando continues through the forest, eating apples from a tree and bird eggs from a nest. As night falls, he comes upon a derelict shrine, a series of stone shelters that contain life-sized sculptural groups that represent the Stations of the Cross. He talks to some Koi fish in a pond and wonders aloud how they survived the Biblical great flood and who feeds them. He hears the sound of a horn and sees three topless women on horses hunting with their dogs. One of the women shoots an elk that disappears, and Fernando appears to have been struck by a bullet. She asks if he is all right and offers food and help. They ride off when he assures them he is not in distress. Fernando settles in his tent for the night, discovers an injured dove in the tent, and heals its injured wing. He wakes to discover the dove has gone and later sees it watching him in the forest, its wing seemingly undamaged.

Someone almost identical in appearance to Fernando–played by a different but strikingly similar actor, who is actually the film's director–comes upon the body of a young man, apparently dead, and breathes him back to life. The young man explains he died last night dancing with his friends and asks "Fernando" if he is now dead. "Fernando" identifies himself as Anthony. The young man says that he is Thomas; he is identical to Jesus and Fernando/Anthony places his fingers into a wound in Jesus/Thomas's right side. They question each other's reality and identity. When Jesus/Thomas sees that Fernando/Anthony has Jesus' sweatshirt, whistle, and knife, he seizes the weapon and slashes Fernando/Anthony's neck.

The scene shifts to the outskirts of Padua in Italy. Jesus/Thomas and Fernando/Anthony are walking along a busy road into town. Fei and Lin wave and call to Fernando/Anthony from the other side of the road. He blesses them, and then continues walking into Padua holding hands with Jesus/Thomas.

== Cast ==
- Paul Hamy as Fernando
- Xelo Cagiao as Jesus / Thomas (the brother of Jesus)
- João Pedro Rodrigues as Anthony
- Han Wen as Fei
- Chan Suan as Lin
- Juliane Elting as Blonde Hunter
- Flora Bulcão as Hunter 1
- Isabelle Puntel as Hunter 2
- Alexandre Alverca, André Freitas, David Silva Pereira, Gil Mendes Da Silva, Miguel Ângelo Marujo, Nuno Santos, Ricardo Jorge as caretos

=== Critical response ===
On the review aggregator Rotten Tomatoes, the film holds an approval rating of 87% based on 63 reviews.

== Awards ==
Award / Film Festival	Category	Recipients and nominees	Result
Denver International Film Festival	Krzysztof Kieslowski Award - Special Mention		Won
Denver International Film Festival	Krzysztof Kieslowski Award for Best Film		Nominated
Locarno International Film Festival	Best Direction	João Pedro Rodrigues	Won
Locarno International Film Festival	Golden Leopard		Nominated
