= Jean-François Richet =

French screenwriter, director and producer (born 1966)

- Born: 2 July 1966 (age 60); Paris, France
- Occupations: Film director, screenwriter, film producer, film editor
- Years active: 1995–present

Jean-François Richet (French pronunciation: [ʒɑ̃fʁɑ̃swa ʁiʃɛ]; born 2 July 1966) is a French screenwriter, film director, and film producer. He grew up in Meaux, an outer suburb east of Paris.

== Select filmography ==
- Inner City (1995) – nominated at the 21st César Awards in the Best First Feature Film (Meilleure Première Œuvre) category.
- Ma 6-T va crack-er (1997) – political exploration of gangs in suburban Paris.
- Assault on Precinct 13 (2005) – a remake of John Carpenter's 1976 film of the same name.
- Mesrine (2008)
- One Wild Moment (2015)
- Blood Father (2016)
- The Emperor of Paris (2018)
- Plane (2023)
- Mutiny (2026)
- The Hunchback, Soul of Paris (2026)
