= Occidental (film) =

- Directed by: Neil Beloufa
- Written by: Neil Beloufa
- Produced by: Jonathan Charbit
- Starring: Idir Chender; Anna Ivacheff; Paul Hamy; Hamza Meziani; Louise Orry-Diquéro; Brahim Tekfa
- Cinematography: Guillaume le Grontec
- Edited by: Ermanno Corrado
- Music by: Gregoire Bourdeil
- Production company: Bad Manners
- Distributed by: Vendredi Distribution
- Release dates: 23 January 2017 (Angers European First Film Festival); 28 March 2018 (France)
- Running time: 73 minutes
- Country: France
- Languages: Italian; Arabic; English; French

Occidental is a 2017 French thriller drama film directed by Neil Beloufa, starring Idir Chender, Anna Ivacheff, Paul Hamy, Hamza Meziani, Louise Orry-Diquéro and Brahim Tekfa.

== Cast ==
- Idir Chender as Antonio
- Anna Ivacheff as Diana
- Paul Hamy as Giorgio
- Hamza Meziani as Khaled
- Louise Orry-Diquéro as Romy
- Brahim Tekfa as Karim
- Françoise Cousin as Sophie
- Pierre Rousselet as Christophe
- Brune Renault as Vanessa
- Geoffrey Carey as M. Dubreuil

== Reception ==
Vassilis Economou of Cineuropa wrote, "Without disclosing his references, ranging from Sartre’s existentialism to Godard’s aesthetics and Warhol’s pop culture, Beloufa mocks the demureness of Western society, criticises its preposterous fears and entombs its endangered, dying ideologies."

Kevin Ritchie of the Now wrote that "despite enjoyable visual delights, Occidental doesn’t quite transcend its metaphorical echo chamber."

Stephen Dalton of The Hollywood Reporter wrote that while the film is "visually and sonically striking", it "never quite delivers the political or emotional payoff seemingly promised by its fraught dramatic buildup."
