= Jean-Luc Couchard =

Belgian actor (born 1969)

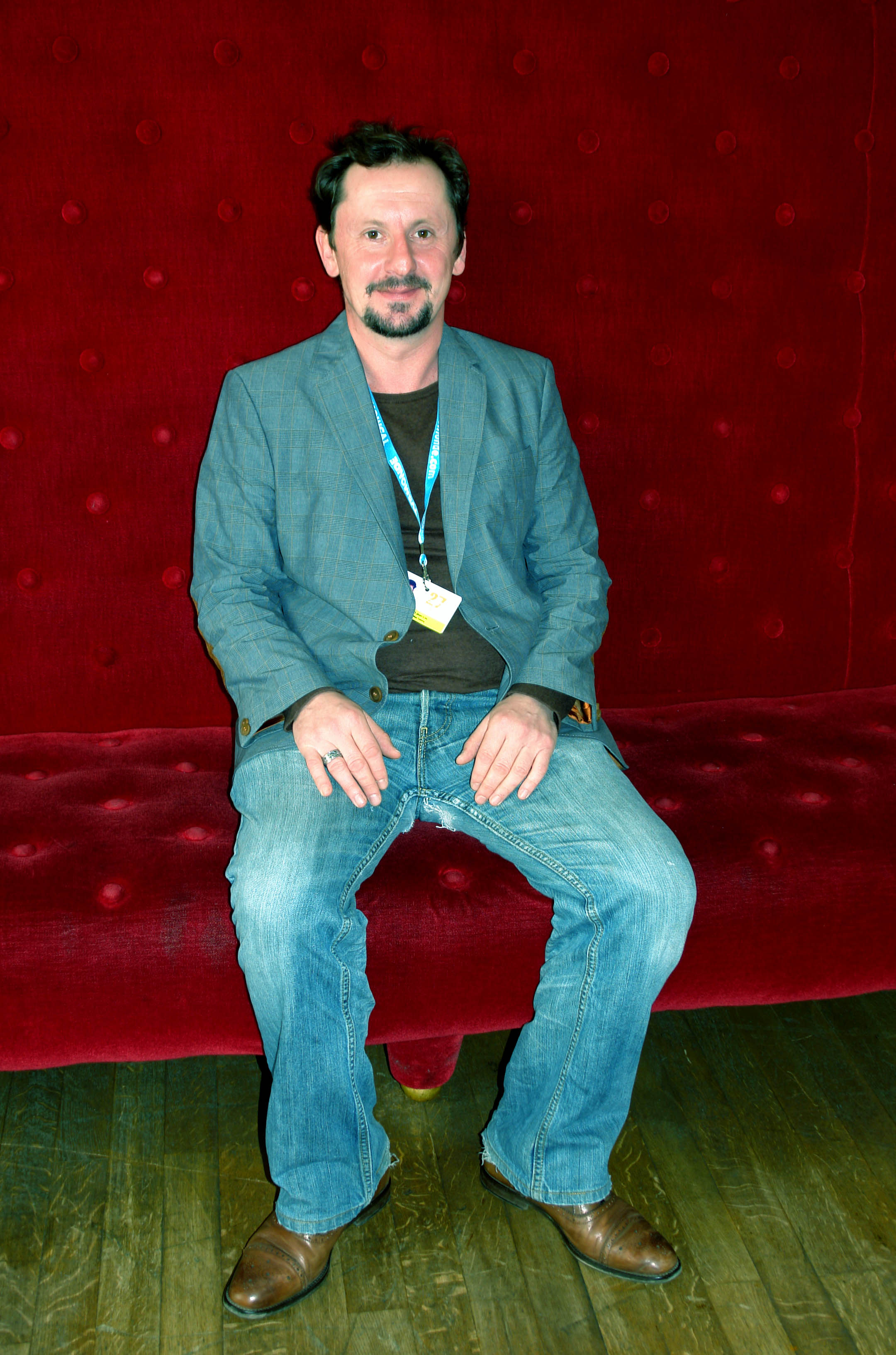
- Couchard in 2012
- Born: 14 July 1969 (age 57); Limbourg, Liège, Belgium
- Occupation: Actor
- Years active: 1993–present

Jean-Luc Couchard (French pronunciation: [ʒɑ̃lyk kuʃaʁ]; born 14 July 1969) is a Belgian actor. He was nominated for Best Supporting Actor for his role as Stieg Brodeck in the comedy-drama Dead Man Talking at the 3rd Magritte Awards in 2013.

== Theater ==
Year	Title	Author	Director
1993	Simenon, un homme connu pour sa notoriété	Georges Simenon	Philippe Derlet
2000	The Masque of the Red Death	Edgar Allan Poe	Jean-Michel D'Hoop
2000	Les Cannibales	Mathias Simon	Mathias Simon
2001	Much Ado About Nothing	William Shakespeare	Jean-Claude Berutti
2001	Le Dragon	Evgueni Schwarz	Axel Debossere
2002	The Triumph of Love	Pierre de Marivaux	Philippe Sireuil
2003	La Conquête du pôle sud	Manfred Karge	Eddy Letexier
2004	L'Opéra bêgue	Dominique Roodooft	Dominique Roodooft
2006	Measure for Measure	William Shakespeare	Philippe Sireuil (2)
2007	Mr Puntila and his Man Matti	Bertolt Brecht	Omar Porras
2009	Cœur ardant	Christien Ostrowski	Christophe Rauck
2010	La Médaille	Lydie Salvayre	Zabou Breitman

== Filmography ==
Year	Title	Role	Director	Notes
1994	Paul, un portrait		Marc Urlus & Joël Warnant	Short
1998	Abattages		Joel Warnant (2)	Short
1998	Il n'y a pas d'amour sans histoires	The supermarket's man	Jérôme Foulon	TV Movie
1999	Quand on est amoureux c'est merveilleux	Adam	Fabrice Du Welz	Short
2000	Deuxième quinzaine de juillet	The camper	Christophe Reichert	
2001	Lisa	The soldier	Pierre Grimblat	
2001	Gregoire Moulin vs. Humanity		Artus de Penguern	
2001	Pâques au tison		Martine Doyen	Short
2001	Le fruit défendu		Joël Warnant (3)	Short
2001	La colère du diable	Michel	Chris Vander Stappen	TV Movie
2002	Maintenant	Hans	Inés Rabadán	Short
2002	The Twice a Month Gang		Hugues Hausman	Short
2003	L'adorable femme des neiges	Gérard	Jean-Marc Vervoort	TV Movie
2004	Calvaire	Boris	Fabrice Du Welz (2)	
2004	Pour le plaisir		Dominique Deruddere	
2004	On ne peut pas tout prévoir.	Jeudi	Samuel Lampaert	Short
2005	Douce nuit		Nicolas Bertrand	Short
2005	Croit		Fabrice Couchard	Short
2006	Dikkenek	Jean-Claude	Olivier Van Hoofstadt	
2006	Congorama	Journalist	Philippe Falardeau	
2006	Mr. Average	Reporter	Pierre-Paul Renders	
2006	Komma	Nurse on call	Martine Doyen (2)	
2007	Taxi 4	The Belgian	Gérard Krawczyk	
2007	Voleurs de chevaux	The border guard	Micha Wald	
2007	Missing	The Inspector	Matthieu Donck	Short
2008	Les dents de la nuit	M. Francis	Stephen Cafiero & Vincent Lobelle	
2008	Mini Trip	Koço	Jean-Michel Vovk	Short
2008	La maison Tellier	Bolbec	Élisabeth Rappeneau	TV Movie
2008	C'est mieux la vie quand on est grand	The judge	Luc Béraud	TV Movie
2008	The Marvelous Flying Box	Mr. Serge	Michael Havenith	TV Mini-Series
2008–10	Hero Corp	Dan	Simon Astier & Sébastien Lalanne	TV Series (11 Episodes)
2009	The Barons	Ozgür	Nabil Ben Yadir	
2010	Nothing to Declare	Brother Vanuxem	Dany Boon	
2010	Protéger & servir	Letellier's driver	Éric Lavaine	
2010	Le baltringue	The boss	Cyril Sebas	
2010	Ladyboys	Henry de Sart	Joel Warnant (4)	
2010	La fin du monde	Serge	Michael Havenith (2)	Short
2010	Les hommes se cachent pour pleurer	Hugues	Fabien G.	Short
2010	Au bonheur des hommes	Picha	Vincent Monnet	TV Movie
2011	My Worst Nightmare	Milou Demeuleu	Anne Fontaine	
2011	Titeuf	The Imaginary Psy	Zep	
2011	Les tribulations d'une caissière	Mercier	Pierre Rambaldi	
2011	Gérald K Gérald	Jean-Claude Freud	Élisabeth Rappeneau (2)	TV Movie
2012	Dead Man Talking	Stieg Brodeck	Patrick Ridremont	Nominated - Magritte Award for Best Supporting Actor
2012	Approved for Adoption	Jung's father	Laurent Boileau & Jung	
2012	Il était une fois, une fois	Frank Vrut	Christian Merret-Palmair	
2013	Win Win	Paul Girard	Claudio Tonetti	
2013	Welcome to China		Olivier Ayache-Vidal	Short
2013	Typique	The uncle	Lionel Delhaye & Benjamin Torrini	TV Mini-Series
2014	Maintenant ou jamais	Man racetrack	Serge Frydman	
2014	Sacré Charlemagne	The French teacher	Adrien François	Short
2014	L'écran démoniaque	The man	Marilyn & Patrick Hella	Short
2014	Marie Curie, une femme sur le front	The chief surgeon	Alain Brunard	TV Movie
2014	La guerre des ondes	Maurice Van Moppes	Laurent Jaoui	TV Movie
2014	Kontainer Kats	Alfonso	Michelangelo Marchese	TV Mini-Series
2015	Babysitting 2	Marco	Nicolas Benamou & Philippe Lacheau	
2015	Belgian Disaster	Raoul	Patrick Glotz	
2015	Le dernier voyage de l'énigmatique Paul WR	The cleaning man	Romain Quirot	Short
2016	The Visitors: Bastille Day	Legendre	Jean-Marie Poiré	
2016	Un jour mon prince!	Puck	Flavia Coste	
2016	Un ciel bleu presque parfait	Simon Dormel	Quarxx	Short
2017	Full House	The Head Of Police	Quentin Bocksberger	Short
2017	Eigen Kweek		Joël Vanhoebrouck	TV Series (1 Episode)
2018	Third Wedding (Troisièmes noces)	Norbert	David Lambert	
