= Occident =

Term for the Western world

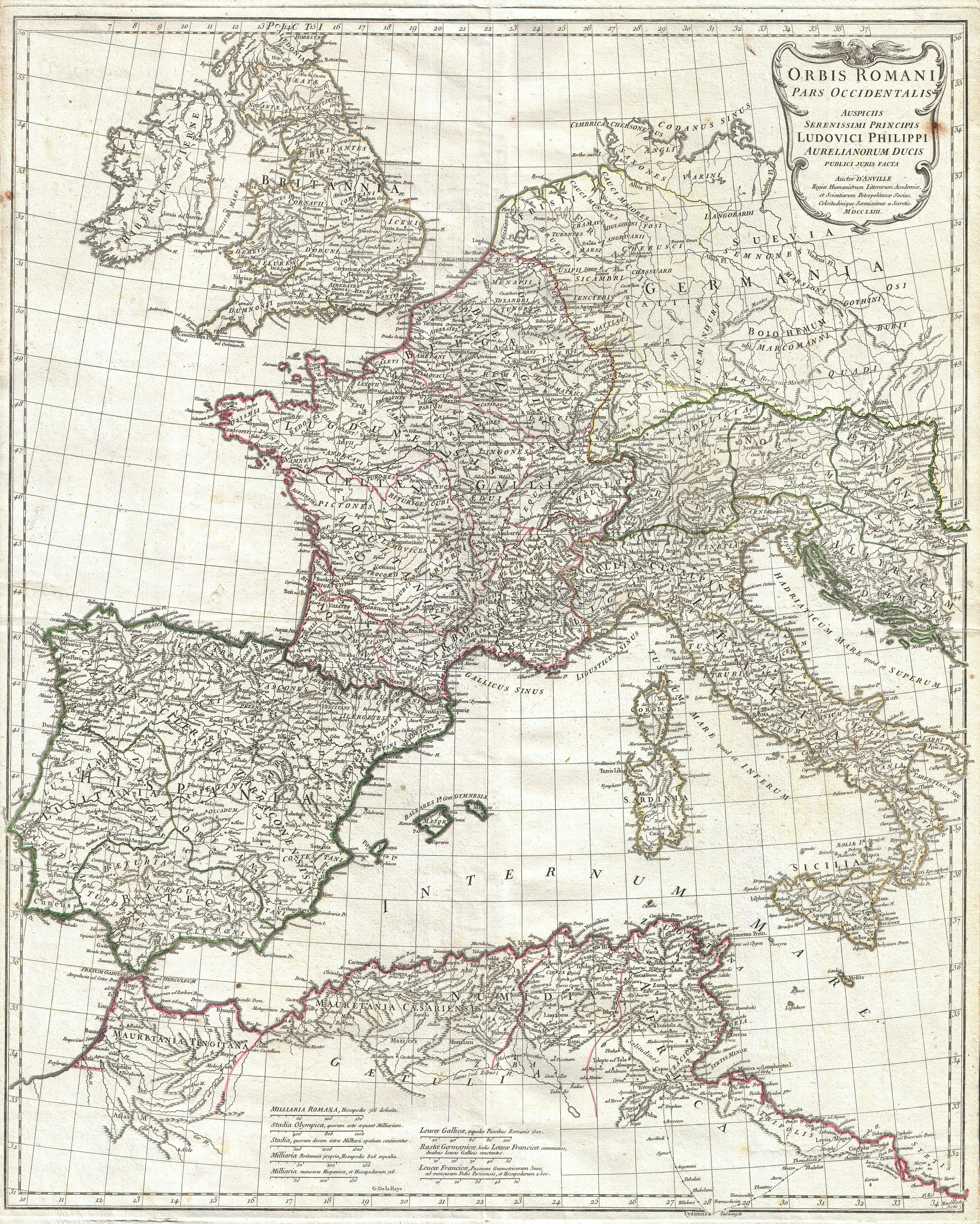
Ancient Occident of the Roman Empire

The Occident is a term for the West, traditionally comprising anything that belongs to the Western world. It is the antonym of the term Orient, referring to the Eastern world. In English, it has largely fallen into disuse. The term occidental is often used to describe objects from the Occident but can be considered an outdated term by some. The term originated with geographical divisions mirroring the cultural divide between the Greek East and the Latin West, and the political divide between the Western and Eastern Roman Empires.

== Etymology ==
The term "Occident" derives from the Latin word occidens meaning "west" (lit. "setting" (where the sun sets) < occido "fall/set").

In Arabic, the Maghreb (maḡrib, Arabic: مَغْرِب < Arabic ḡarb غَرْب "to go down, to set") literally means "the sunset", "the west". Historically, the Maghreb was the southern part of the Western Roman Empire.

Another word for Occident in German is Abendland (rarely: Okzident), now mainly poetic, which literally translates as "evening land". The antonym "Morgenland" is also mainly poetic, and refers to Asia.

The opposite term "Orient" derives from the Latin word oriens, meaning "east" (lit. "rising" < orior "rise").

== History of the term ==
The adjectival term "Occidental" has been used to mean cultures, peoples, countries, European rugs, and goods from the Occident. "Occidental" means generally "western". It is a traditional designation (especially when capitalized) for anything belonging to the Occident or "West" (for Europe), and especially of its Western culture. It indicated the western direction in historical astronomy, often abbreviated "Occ".

In Occidentalism: The West in the Eyes of its Enemies (2004), Ian Buruma and Avishai Margalit said that nationalist and nativist resistance to the West replicates Eastern-world responses against the socioeconomic forces of modernization, which originated in Western culture, among utopian radicals and conservative nationalists who viewed capitalism, liberalism, and secularism as forces destructive of their societies and cultures. While the early responses to the West were a genuine encounter between alien cultures, many of the later manifestations of Occidentalism betray the influence of Western ideas upon Eastern intellectuals, such as the supremacy of the nation-state, the Romantic rejection of rationality, and the spiritual impoverishment of the citizenry of liberal democracies.

Buruma and Margalit trace that resistance to German Romanticism and to the debates, between the Westernizers and the Slavophiles in 19th century Russia, and show that like arguments appear in the ideologies of Zionism, Maoism, Islamism, and Imperial Japanese nationalism. Nonetheless, Alastair Bonnett rejects the analyses of Buruma and Margalit as Eurocentric, and said that the field of Occidentalism emerged from the interconnection of Eastern and Western intellectual traditions.
