= Yannick (film) =

2023 film by Quentin Dupieux

- Theatrical release poster
- Directed by: Quentin Dupieux
- Written by: Quentin Dupieux
- Produced by: Quentin Dupieux; Thomas Verhaeghe; Mathieu Verhaeghe; Hugo Selignac
- Starring: Raphaël Quenard; Pio Marmaï; Blanche Gardin; Sébastien Chassagne
- Cinematography: Quentin Dupieux
- Edited by: Quentin Dupieux
- Production companies: Atelier de Production; Chi-Fou-Mi Productions
- Distributed by: Diaphana Distribution
- Release date: 2 August 2023 (France)
- Running time: 67 minutes
- Country: France
- Language: French
- Box office: $3.5 million

Yannick is a 2023 French black comedy film written, shot, edited and directed by Quentin Dupieux. The film stars Raphaël Quenard as a heckler who takes a Parisian theatre hostage and rewrites the play under his own direction. The production of the film was kept secret until a month before its theatrical release on 2 August 2023 by Diaphana Distribution. It screened in the international competition at the Locarno Film Festival the next day.

== Plot ==
The film opens with a production of a boulevard comedy called Le Cocu ('The Cuckold') at the Bouffes Parisiens. The three actors – Sophie Denis, Paul Rivière and William Keller – are performing in front of a half-empty room when they are suddenly interrupted by Yannick, a night parking watchman from Melun. He explains to them that he finds the play bad and says it can't make him forget his daily problems. He took an extra day off, travelled 45 minutes to Paris and walked another 15 minutes to see the play.

The actors, as well as certain people from the audience, ask Yannick to leave the room if he is unhappy, to the point that Paul gets off the stage and very aggressively insists that he gets out. As he takes his coat from the cloakroom, Yannick hears laughter coming from inside the theatre. The actors, still a little surprised by the situation that has just unfolded, make fun of Yannick, before resuming the performance. Yannick comes back, this time in much more anger, armed with a revolver, and takes the room hostage.

He sets about rewriting the play with the actors under his direction. Yannick wants to prove that a parking attendant can produce an evening of entertainment. Yannick asks one of the spectators, an office worker, to lend him his laptop in order to write a new play which he believes will be much better than Le Cocu. Although he has great difficulty using a computer, he manages to write his play. While the actors, still under threat, learn the new script, Yannick takes the opportunity to sympathize with the spectators, still in shock from the situation. Sophie comes up with a plan and asks Paul to take Yannick's gun.

Paul asks Yannick to chat with him then takes advantage of a short moment of inattention to take his gun. Paul suddenly becomes aggressive, humiliates Yannick for all the harm he has caused and orders him to get on the ground and lick the floor. Yannick makes fun of Paul and doesn't believe that the latter knows how to use a weapon until he shoots at the ceiling. Paul declares that he is jealous of Yannick's sudden popularity with the public with whom he sympathized with. He is suddenly knocked out by a technician hidden in the background, thinking that he was the attacker. Yannick immediately takes the weapon back but applauds Paul for his performance. His applause is followed by the audience and Paul and the other actors thank them.

Yannick's play begins. Paul plays a doctor, Sophie the assistant and William the dead man. The assistant performs an autopsy on a corpse but is corrected by the doctor who explains to her that the dead man is not really dead and that he is just lacking love. The assistant kisses the dead man, despite his bad breath, and he wakes up. The actors play as best as they can, with the script in hand, full of mistakes and bad wording, but the audience laugh throughout the performance. Yannick, behind the scenes, watches the play while discreetly giving directions to the actors, then cries of joy.

At the same time, a spectator manages to quietly escape from the room and calls the police. The film ends with the B.R.I. who is about to enter the theatre.

== Cast ==
- Raphaël Quenard as Yannick
- Pio Marmaï as Paul Rivière
- Blanche Gardin as Sophie Denis
- Sébastien Chassagne as William Keller
- Agnès Hurstel as the cloakroom attendant
- Jean-Paul Solal as the angry gentleman
- Laurent Nicolas as the man at the computer
- Mustapha Abourachid as the guest at the restaurant
- Sava Lolov as the driving school owner
- Charlotte Laemmel as the driving school owner
- Franck Lebreton as the theatre technician
- Félix Bossuet as the adolescent
- Agathe L'Huillier as the adolescent's mother
- Caroline Piette as the woman in the front row
- Loelia Salvador as the girl with the cat
- Lucie Gallo as the girl with the click-clack
- Stéphane Pezerat as the man who escapes

== Production ==
Yannick was directed by French musician and filmmaker Quentin Dupieux, who also wrote the screenplay. It is his 12th feature film. The film was produced by Dupieux, Thomas and Mathieu Verhaeghe for Atelier de Production, and Hugo Selignac for Chi-Fou-Mi Productions.

Rising actor Raphaël Quenard, known for Les Mauvais Garçons, Final Cut and Junkyard Dog, plays the disappointed theatergoer Yannick in the title role. He previously featured with supporting roles in Dupieux's fantasy comedy Mandibles (2020) alongside Adèle Exarchopoulos and Grégoire Ludig and in Dupieux's science fiction comedy Smoking Causes Coughing (2022). Pio Marmaï, Blanche Gardin and Sébastien Chassagne play the three actors on stage.

The film was shot inside the Théâtre Déjazet in Paris, located in the city's 3rd arrondissement. The venue has 1,000 seats and has been in existence since 1851, making it one of the oldest theaters in Paris. Production for the film was fully secret, with principal photography lasting six days. Dupieux served as director of photography and also edited the film.

== Release ==
On 28 June 2023, Quentin Dupieux surprise announced the film through his social media accounts. Yannick was theatrically released on 2 August 2023 by Diaphana Distribution. International sales are handled by Kinology. The film was selected to compete for the Golden Leopard at the 76th Locarno Film Festival, where it had its international premiere on 3 August 2023.

== Reception ==
=== Box office ===
Yannick grossed $3.5 million in France, and $0 in other territories, for a worldwide total of $3.5 million.

In France, the film opened alongside Meg 2: The Trench, Les Blagues de Toto 2 – Classe verte, The Hummingbird, Detective Conan: Black Iron Submarine and Wild Flowers. The film sold 26,363 admissions on its first day, 3,524 of which were preview screenings. It went on to sell 101,483 admissions in its opening weekend, finishing 9th at the box office, behind Barbie, Oppenheimer, En eaux très troubles, Les Blagues de Toto 2 – Classe verte, Mission: Impossible – Dead Reckoning Part One, Elemental, Haunted Mansion and Indiana Jones and the Dial of Destiny. The film has since sold a total of 445,750 admissions.

=== Critical response ===
Yannick received an average rating of 3.8 out of 5 stars on the French website AlloCiné, based on 28 reviews. On the review aggregator website Rotten Tomatoes, 94% of 18 critics' reviews are positive, with an average rating of 7.0/10. Metacritic, which uses a weighted average, assigned the film a score of 73 out of 100, based on 6 critics, indicating "generally favorable" reviews.

Jordan Mintzer of The Hollywood Reporter called the film mostly fun and praised its "handful of lively performances and a few hilarious one-liners scattered throughout the mayhem." Mintzer, however, also criticized the film, writing, "As in several of Dupieux's movies, this one ultimately lacks a punchline or something resembling a full denouement."

=== Accolades ===
Award	Date of ceremony	Category	Recipient(s)	Result	Ref.
César Awards	23 February 2024	Best Actor	Raphaël Quenard	Nominated	
César Awards	23 February 2024	Best Supporting Actor	Pio Marmaï	Nominated	
Festival du nouveau cinéma	15 October 2023	Prix du public Temps Ø	Yannick	Nominated	
Locarno Film Festival	12 August 2023	Golden Leopard	Yannick	Nominated	
Locarno Film Festival	12 August 2023	European Cinemas Label Award	Yannick	Won	
Lumière Awards	22 January 2024	Best Screenplay	Quentin Dupieux	Nominated	
