= The Piano Accident =

2025 film by Quentin Dupieux

- Theatrical release poster
- French: L'Accident de piano
- Directed by: Quentin Dupieux
- Written by: Quentin Dupieux
- Produced by: Hugo Sélignac
- Starring: Adèle Exarchopoulos; Jérôme Commandeur; Sandrine Kiberlain; Karim Leklou
- Cinematography: Quentin Dupieux
- Edited by: Quentin Dupieux
- Music by: Mr Oizo
- Production companies: Chi-Fou-Mi Productions; Arte France Cinéma; Auvergne-Rhône-Alpes Cinéma
- Distributed by: Diaphana Distribution
- Release date: 2 July 2025
- Running time: 88 minutes
- Country: France
- Language: French
- Box office: $2.7 million

The Piano Accident (French: L'Accident de piano) is a 2025 French absurdist comedy film written, directed, shot and edited by Quentin Dupieux. Adèle Exarchopoulos stars in the lead role, with a supporting cast of Jérôme Commandeur, Sandrine Kiberlain and Karim Leklou.

== Plot ==
Social media sensation Magalie, who is known for posting shocking content, suffers a serious accident during the filming of one of her videos. She retreats to the mountains where she is accompanied by her assistant. Her peace there is interrupted when a journalist begins blackmailing her.

== Cast ==
- Adèle Exarchopoulos as Magalie Moreau
- Jérôme Commandeur as Patrick Balandras
- Sandrine Kiberlain as Simone Herzog
- Karim Leklou as Roméo

== Production ==
The project was first announced as L'Avant-dernière séance in July 2024 through a casting call, which revealed the film would star Adèle Exarchopoulos and would begin shooting in 2025. Exarchopoulos previously collaborated with Dupieux on his films Mandibles (2020) and Smoking Causes Coughing (2022). The film was produced by Hugo Sélignac at Chi-Fou-Mi Productions.

Pincipal photography was projected to begin on 13 January 2025 in the Haute-Savoie department and last until 13 February, according to the website of the Auvergne-Rhône-Alpes region. Locations included Megève and its surroundings (Altiport, Chalet La Mona, La Livraz Nordic ski area), Combloux (Hotel Au Coeur des Près) and Sallanches (Gymnase de Cayenne). Shooting was also set to take place in February 2025 in the Var department, near Toulon and La Londe-les-Maures, according to a casting call published on 6 December 2024.

== Release ==
The film was previewed at the Cinéma Star Saint-Exupéry and UGC Ciné Cité Strasbourg on 16 June 2025. It was theatrically released in France by Diaphana Distribution on 2 July 2025. International sales are handled by the Paris-based company Lucky Number, which presented the film at the Marché du Film in Cannes to be acquired by distributors around the world.

The film competed in the Progressive Cinema Competition section of the 20th Rome Film Festival in October 2025.
