= Sentinelle (2023 film) =

2023 French film starring Jonathan Cohen

- Directed by: Hugo Benamozig; David Caviglioli
- Screenplay by: Hugo Benamozig; David Caviglioli
- Starring: Jonathan Cohen; Emmanuelle Bercot; Raphaël Quenard
- Cinematography: Vincent Mathias
- Music by: Thomas Couzinier; Frédéric Kooshmanian
- Production companies: 22h22; Les Films entre 2 et 4
- Release date: 8 September 2023
- Country: France
- Language: French

Sentinelle (2023) is a French police action-comedy film written and directed by Hugo Benamozig and David Caviglioli, released on 8 September 2023 on Prime Video. The film stars Jonathan Cohen in the titular role of Captain François Sentinelle, an incompetent police officer with ambitions of being a famous musician, who must uncover a conspiracy to threaten Presidential candidate Florence Cazeaux-Rocher (Emmanuelle Bercot) in the island of Réunion. When her husband is abducted and her assistant killed, Sentinelle must uncover the criminals behind the plot and restore order to the elections with his serious and capable subordinate Rémi Morisset (Raphaël Quenard).

== Plot ==
The movie begins with Captain François Sentinelle (Jonathan Cohen) and his subordinate Remi Morisset (Raphaël Quenard) chasing an active shooter and homicide suspect, Stevian. The chase ends with Sentinelle accidentally ramming his car into Stevian, while Morisset gets shot in the leg. Instead of taking the suspect to the police station, Sentinelle, who is late to the filming of the music video for his latest single "Est-ce tu regrettes?", takes Stevian to the set to play the role of his romantic rival. The situation ends badly with Stevian escaping and several innocents getting shot, mostly shot by Sentinelle who cannot aim.

Some time later, Sentinelle is summoned to the house of Florence Cazeaux-Rocher (Emmanuelle Bercot), the incumbent President of Réunion for the past 12 years. In the upcoming elections, Cazeaux-Rocher is to face rising candidate Laurent Chakravarty. She shows Sentinelle a video from a mysterious organisation of masked men named Bras Rouge blackmailing her to she resign and withdraw from the elections or her family's lives will be in danger. She orders Sentinelle to personally uncover and capture the masked men.

At the police station, Sentinelle asks his subordinates Morisset, Maousse (Luca Besse) and Serpent (Hugo Dillon) to investigate the Bras Rouge. Morisset suggests that they visit an archaeology professor at Saint-Denis university, Amandine Bègue (Jessy Ugolin) who has written a book about the Bras Rouge, a society of escaped slaves who rebelled against the French colonisers. Sentinelle agrees so he can promote his new album to the students. Bègue tells Sentinelle and Morisset that the Bras Rouge never existed and were a Creole legend of escaped slaves who freed other slaves and took revenge on the white slaveowners. When Sentintelle reveals that Cazeaux-Rocher was threatened, she tells them that in some versions of the legend, the Bras Rouge were from the Cazeaux plantations, and that the Cazeaux family made their money off sugar and slavery.

Fifteen days before the elections, a group of masked men break into the President's house and abduct her husband Valéry Rocher (Gustave Kervern). Meanwhile, Sentinelle is editing his new music video, when his producer Frédo (Ramzy Bedia) tells him that he is dropping him because he has not had a hit in nine albums since The Kiki. The masked men graffiti a wall with the words "Bras Rouge". In response to the abduction, Laurent Chakravarthy suspends his campaign. Morisset convinces Sentinelle that solving a case this big will be good for his public reputation. Sentinelle's spirits are lifted as he realizes that releasing his new album after solving the case will make him a huge success.

Professor Bègue visits the police station to inform them that the Bras Rogue are quoting directly from her book, which sold very few copies. She brings a record from the college library indicating that the book was borrowed once in the last month by Gilles Hoarau (Ken Eind), assistant to the President. Sentinelle calls Cazeaux-Rocher to tell her that her assistant is working with the kidnappers. That night, Sentinelle and Morisset stake out Hoarau's house. The two get into a major argument and Morisset storms out. Meanwhile, two masked men break into Hoarau's house unnoticed and attempt to kill him.

The next morning, Sentinelle arrives with the media to cover his SWAT mission to break into Hoarau's house and arrest him. The police find three corpses, Hoarau and two attackers. Sentinelle and Morisset both correctly deduce that there were only two attackers and that their car must be nearby. The car was registered to a Jonas Terrence (Matthieu Virginius) living at Cascade Project in Bras Panon. Armed with guns and bulletproof vests, the two pay Terrence's flat a visit. An attacker in a pink hoodie (Joseph Woerlen) shoots Morisset and nearly drowns Sentinelle, but the two somehow survive while the attacker escapes. Morisset finds a pile of half-destroyed burner phones in the apartment. One of the phones has a text mentioning a meeting place at a music show on Sunday.

At the music show, Morisset asks around about Jonas Terrence while Sentinelle gets high and enjoys the Sorcerer's (Laurent Evuort-Orlandi) music. The Sorcerer, who was previously revealed to be working for the kidnappers masterminded by Cazeaux-Rocher, recognizes Sentinelle and runs back to his car. Maousse calls Morisset to tell him that one of the burner phones in evidence received a phone call from the show's location. Meanwhile, Cazeaux-Rocher wins the election by sympathy vote and receives a call from Sorcerer, who tells her to call Sentinelle off his trail. Sentinelle follows Sorcerer to tell him how much his music has inspired him and notices his glove box is full of burner phones. The next day, Cazeaux-Rocher visits Frédo to strongarm him into releasing Sentinelle's new album to distract him from the case.

Back at the police station, Morisset reveals the hierarchy of the kidnapping operation uncovered by tracing the phone calls received by Jonas and Freddy Terrence. Frédo interrupts to tell Sentinelle he will produce his album after all, so when Morisset posits that the kidnapping was spearheaded by Cazeaux-Rocher to win the election, Sentinelle, who is distracted, laughs him off and tells him to find the address of Sorcerer, with whom he wants to collaborate on a song, instead. Morisset refuses, the two men fall out again and Morisset goes to Internal Affairs while Sentinelle tracks down The Sorcerer.

Cazeaux-Rocher visits The Sorcerer who has her husband locked up on his premises. When The Sorcerer tries to blackmail her, she orders Rayane to kill him. She then kills Rayane herself. As she is disposing of the bodies, Sentinelle arrives looking for The Sorcerer. Realizing that Morisset was right, Sentinelle and Cazeaux-Rocher get into a struggle, where both are nearly killed. Internal Affairs and Morisset arrive in the nick of time to save Sentinelle and lock up Cazeaux-Rocher. Sentinelle is put on permanent suspension and Morisset is promoted to Sentinelle's previous position.

One year later, Morisset is with Amandine Bègue, who is pregnant, and visiting Sentinelle at his new beachside bar-and-live-music joint. Sentinelle is now married and a music producer. He is also the head of a new detective agency of armed bartender-detectives.

== Cast ==
- Jonathan Cohen as Captain François Sentinelle, an incompetent police officer who maintains his position as head of a police unit, thanks to his political connections.
- Raphaël Quenard as Rémi Morisset, a police officer transferred from the mainland, who frequently butts heads with his superior Sentinelle over his incompetence
- Emmanuelle Bercot as Florence Cazeaux-Rocher, a politician descended from a family of slave-owners and whose father, Maurice Cazeaux, was President of Réunion for 24 years before her own Presidency of 12 years. It is revealed that she is responsible for Sentinelle's long career as she believed him too incompetent to actual catch any of her crimes.
- Gustave Kervern as Valéry Rocher, Florence's husband who was once the CEO of the largest construction company on the island and who gets abducted 15 days before the Presidential elections
- Ramzy Bedia as Frédo, Sentinelle's music producer who struggles to tell the truth unless speaking through his hand puppet
- Laurent Evuort-Orlandi as The Sorcerer, a local musician whom Sentinelle admires for his creativity and who is secretly part of the kidnapping scheme
- Ken Eind as Gilles Hoarau, Florence's assistant and bodyguard
- Jessy Ugolin as Amandine Bègue, an archaeologist at Saint-Denis University, who wrote a book on the Bras Rouge legend
- Joseph Woerlen as Rayane, the attacker in the pink hoodie, who runs into Sentinelle and Morisset at the Terrence house where he is sent to destroy their burner phones and other evidence
- Matthieu Virginius as Jonas Terrence, one of the attackers of Gilles Hoarau, who was killed in the process. He had a history of violence.
- Dimitri Virginius as Freddy Terence
- Carlito Benzini as Stevian
- Luca Besse as Maousse
- Hugo Dillon as Serpent

Other cast members include Hervé Rakotofiringa as Laurent Chakravarty, Abdoulaye Gago as Abdou the music video editor, Yann Papin as the music video director, Thierry René as Lieutenant Wagner from Internal Affairs, Louzolo Mahonga as Timotheé, Audrey Dorval as Carole and Yves Tolita as Michele the passer-by.

== Production ==
According to Cohen, the film was born from an idea due to Benamozig and Caviglioli of a singer-cop. Benamozig and Caviglioli had previously worked with him on the film Terrible Jungle (2020). Cohen further stated that just as OSS 117 parodied the spy genre and out-dated masculinity, Sentinelle was aiming to parody police dramas like Miami Vice. It was Cohen's idea to give his character a shaggy mullet.

The film was shot at the end of 2022 in Réunion.

== Release ==
At the event Prime Video Presents France 2023, it was announced that Sentinelle would be released on 8 September 2023. As promotion for the film, a teaser and a music video of "Est-ce tu regrettes?" were released by Prime Video on 19 and 21 July 2023 respectively.

The film was screened at the Angoulême Francophone Film Festival on 27 August 2023, before it was released internationally on 8 September 2023 on Amazon Prime Video. The film reached the top spot of Prime Video's viewing charts in France.

== Reception ==
The film received mostly positive reviews from French critics. According to Guillemette Odicino, writing for Télérama, the film recalls American comedies by the Farrelly Brothers and Adam McKay. Pablo Baron, similarly, made comparisons between Sentinelle and past fictional characters like Frank Drebin and OSS 117. Théo Ribeton for Les Inrocks magazine, described the comedy as having all the makings of a cult film. The performances of Cohen, Quenard and Bercot received praise.

Some critics, like Adam Sanchez writing for GQ France, noted that the script was a weak point of the film and that the film felt like a stretched-out sketch, while still praising the performances, in particular pointing out that Quenard was underused.
