= Marguerite's Theorem =

- Theatrical release poster
- French: Le Théorème de Marguerite
- Directed by: Anna Novion
- Written by: Anna Novion; Mathieu Robin; Marie-Stéphane Imbert; Agnès Feuvre
- Produced by: Miléna Poylo; Gilles Sacuto
- Starring: Ella Rumpf; Jean-Pierre Darroussin; Clotilde Courau; Julien Frison
- Cinematography: Jacques Girault
- Edited by: Anne Souriau
- Music by: Pascal Bideau
- Production companies: TS Productions; France 2 Cinéma; RTS Radio Télévision Suisse; Beauvoir Films
- Distributed by: Pyramide
- Release dates: 22 May 2023 (Cannes); 1 November 2023 (France)
- Running time: 112 minutes
- Countries: France; Switzerland
- Language: French
- Budget: €2.870.000; (est.) $3.2 million; €2.9 million; (est.) $3.4 million
- Box office: €1.6 million; $1.2 million

Marguerite's Theorem (French: Le Théorème de Marguerite) is 2023 French-Swiss drama film co-written and directed by Anna Novion. It is about a female mathematics student at ENS whose career is upended when an error is discovered in her work. It premiered on 22 May 2023 at the 76th Cannes Film Festival. It was distributed in France on 1 November 2023.

== Synopsis ==
Marguerite is a young and brilliant mathematician, the only girl in her class at the ENS, entirely devoted to her passion. The day an error is discovered in her thesis, she is devastated. In a dizzy spell, she leaves the school, wiping out the past. She then dives into the real world, discovers autonomy, befriends the young Noa, and has sex for the first time. Matured by her experiences, it is in this new momentum that she manages to find a correct proof of her theorem.

== Cast ==
- Ella Rumpf as Marguerite Hoffmann
- Jean-Pierre Darroussin as Laurent Werner, her thesis advisor
- Clotilde Courau as Suzanne
- Julien Frison as Lucas Savelli
- Sonia Bonny as Noa
- Cheng Xiaoxing (credited Maurice Cheng) as Mr. Kong
- Idir Azougli as Yanis
- Camille de Sablet as the trainer
- Édouard Sulpice as a student
- Yun-Ping He as a mahjong opponent
- Karl Ruben Noel as the dancer
- Ava Baya as the dancer's girlfriend
- Gauthier Boxebeld as the manager
- Leila Muse as the journalist
- Esdras Registe as the colleague
- Dominique Ratonnat as the professor
- Capucine Chappey as Lucas's English-speaking friend

== Production ==
To show mathematics realistically on the screen, Anna Novion worked with French mathematician Ariane Mézard, who provided all the equations written by the characters in the film, so that they are all authentic. Moreover, Mézard even made real progress on Goldbach's conjecture, the goal of Marguerite's work, for the film.

== Release ==
Marguerite's Theorem was selected to be screened in the Special Screenings section at the 76th Cannes Film Festival, where it had its world premiere on 22 May 2023.

The film was theatrically released in France by Pyramide on 1 November 2023.

== Reception ==
=== Box office ===
Marguerite's Theorem grossed $0 in North America and $1.2 million in other countries, against a production budget of about $3.2-3.4 million.

=== Critical response ===
On the review aggregator website Rotten Tomatoes, 57% of 14 critics' reviews are positive, with an average rating of 5.6/10.

=== Accolades ===
Award	Date of ceremony	Category	Recipient(s)	Result	Ref.
César Awards	23 February 2024	Best Female Revelation	Ella Rumpf	Won	
César Awards	23 February 2024	Best Male Revelation	Julien Frison	Nominated	
Lumière Awards	22 January 2024	Best Female Revelation	Ella Rumpf	Won	
Paris Film Critics Association Awards	4 February 2024	Best Female Revelation	Ella Rumpf	Won	
