= No Dogs or Italians Allowed =

- Theatrical release poster
- French: Interdit aux chiens et aux italiens
- Directed by: Alain Ughetto
- Written by: Alain Ughetto; Anne Paschetta; Alexis Galmot
- Produced by: Alexandre Cornu
- Starring: Stefano Paganini; Ariane Ascaride
- Cinematography: Fabien Drouet; Sara Sponga
- Edited by: Denis Leborgne
- Music by: Nicola Piovani
- Production companies: Les Films du Tambour de Soie; Vivement Lundi!; Foliascope; Graffiti Film; Lux Fugit Film; Umedia; Nadasdy Film; Ocidental Filmes; Auvergne-Rhône-Alpes Cinéma; Radio Télévision Suisse
- Distributed by: Gebeka Films (France); Le Parc Distribution (Belgium); Risi Film (Portugal); Lucky Red (Italy); Outside the Box (Switzerland)
- Release dates: 15 June 2022 (Annecy); 25 January 2023 (France); 15 March 2023 (Belgium); 30 March 2023 (Portugal); 31 August 2023 (Italy); 27 September 2023 (Switzerland)
- Running time: 70 minutes
- Countries: France; Italy; Belgium; Switzerland; Portugal
- Languages: French; Italian; German
- Budget: €3.7 million
- Box office: $1.4 million

No Dogs or Italians Allowed (French: Interdit aux chiens et aux italiens) is a 2022 adult animated comedy-drama film written and directed by Alain Ughetto.

== Plot ==
A coproduction of companies from France, Italy, Belgium, Switzerland and Portugal, the claymation film recounts the story of Ughetto's grandfather Luigi, who emigrated from Italy to France in the early 1900s for a better life despite widespread anti-Italian discrimination in that era.

As Ughetto never really knew his grandfather, due to Luigi's death when Ughetto was only an infant, the film was based principally on stories told to Ughetto by his grandmother Cesira, Luigi's widow.

== Cast ==
The film's voice cast includes Stefano Paganini as Luigi, Ariane Ascaride as Cesira and narration by Ughetto himself, as well as Diego Giuliani, Christophe Gatto, Laurent Pasquier, Bruno Fontaine, Angelo Rinna, Laura Devoti, Aude Carpintieri, Thierry Buenafuente, Carlo Ferrante, Gaia Saitta, Jacques Chambon, Pascal Gimenez, Moritz Korff, Martin Prill and Waléry Doumenc in supporting roles.

== Production and release ==
The film was produced by France's Les Films du Tambour de soie and Vivement Lundi!, and coproduced by Foliascope, by Belgian company Lux Fugit Film, Italian outfit Graffiti Film, Portuguese company Ocidental Filmes and Swiss outfit Nadasdy Film, with Auvergne-Rhône-Alpes Cinéma, the RTS and the RTBF. It was sold by Indie Sales.

The film was completed in May 2022 and premiered at the Annecy International Animated Film Festival, winning the Jury Prize for feature film and the GAN Foundation Prize. It was released in France by Gebeka Films on 25 January 2023 and exceeded 208,000 admissions, ranking 4 at the 2023 box office. As of January 2024, the film won more than 20 awards. It was released in Belgium by Le Parc Distribution on 15 March 2023. It was released in Portugal by Risi Film on 30 March 2023, under the title Interdito a Cães e Italianos. It was released in Italy by Lucky Red on 31 August 2023, under the title Manodopera. The film was theatrically released in Switzerland by Outside the Box on 27 September 2023.

== Accolades ==
Award	Date of ceremony	Category	Recipient(s)	Result	Ref.
Annecy International Animation Film Festival	18 June 2022	Jury Award	No Dogs or Italians Allowed	Won	
Annecy International Animation Film Festival	18 June 2022	GAN Foundation Award	No Dogs or Italians Allowed	Won	
César Awards	23 February 2024	Best Animated Film	No Dogs or Italians Allowed	Nominated	
European Film Awards	10 December 2022	Best Animated Feature Film	No Dogs or Italians Allowed	Won	
Lumière Awards	22 January 2024	Best Animated Film	No Dogs or Italians Allowed	Nominated	
Magritte Award	9 March 2024	Best Foreign Film	No Dogs or Italians Allowed	Nominated	
Tokyo Anime Award	14 March 2023	Grand Prix	No Dogs or Italians Allowed	Won	
Tokyo Anime Award	14 March 2023	Governor of Tokyo Award	No Dogs or Italians Allowed	Won	
Bucheon International Animation Festival	23 February 2024	Grand Prix	No Dogs or Italians Allowed	Won	
