= The Rapture (2023 film) =

2023 film by Iris Kaltenbäck

- Theatrical release poster
- French: Le Ravissement
- Directed by: Iris Kaltenbäck
- Written by: Iris Kaltenbäck
- Produced by: Alice Bloch; Thierry de Clermont Tonnerre
- Starring: Hafsia Herzi; Alexis Manenti; Nina Meurisse
- Cinematography: Marine Atlan
- Edited by: Suzana Pedro; Pierre Deschamps
- Music by: Alexandre de La Baume
- Production companies: MACT Productions; Marianne Productions; Arte France Cinéma; JPG Films; BNP Paribas Pictures
- Distributed by: Diaphana Distribution
- Release dates: 20 May 2023 (Cannes); 11 October 2023 (France)
- Running time: 97 minutes
- Country: France
- Language: French
- Box office: $334,515

The Rapture (French: Le Ravissement) is a 2023 French drama film written and directed by Iris Kaltenbäck, in her feature directorial debut. It stars Hafsia Herzi as a midwife who passes off her best friend's newborn child as her own.

The film had its world premiere in the Critics' Week section of the 76th Cannes Film Festival on 20 May 2023, where it was nominated for the Caméra d'Or and won the Prix SACD. It was theatrically released in France on 11 October 2023 by Diaphana Distribution.

== Plot ==
Lydia is a young midwife. While she has enjoyed professional success, she is less fortunate in her private life: another relationship of hers has broken down. At the same time, Lydia finds out that her best friend Salomé is pregnant. She supports her friend through her pregnancy and is in charge of delivering the baby. Shortly after the birth, Lydia is spending time alone with Salomé's baby when she runs into Milo, with whom she had a one-night stand after her break-up. She passes off Salomé's child as her own, and tells Milo that he is the biological father. At first Milo is suspicious, but he then embraces his new role as a father. Lydia works hard to keep up the lie.

== Cast ==
- Hafsia Herzi as Lydia
- Alexis Manenti as Milos
- Nina Meurisse as Salomé
- Younès Boucif as Jonathan
- Radmila Karabatic as Jelena
- Dusko Badnjar as Ivan
- Ana Blagojevič as Miléna
- Grégoire Didelot as Philippe
- Mathieu Perotto as Julien

== Production ==
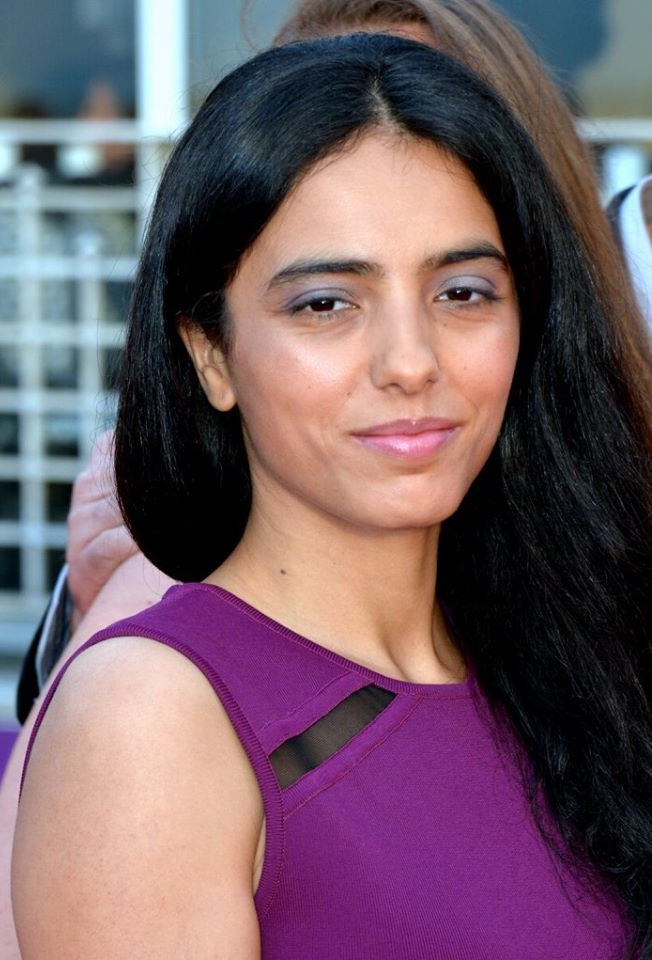
Hafsia Herzi in 2018

The Rapture is the feature film debut of French director Iris Kaltenbäck, who also wrote the screenplay. Hafsia Herzi was selected for the main role of Lydia. The cast was rounded out with the additions of Alexis Manenti, Nina Meurisse and Younès Boucif. Filming began on 17 October 2022 and took place in the Île-de-France and Normandy regions. The six-week shoot with Marine Atlan as director of photography was wrapped on 25 November. The editors were Suzana Pedro and Pierre Deschamps.

The producers for the film were Alice Bloch (Marianne Productions) and Thierry de Clermont-Tonnerre (MACT Productions), with JPG Films in co-production. It was pre-bought by Canal+ and Ciné+. The project was financially supported by the Île-de-France and Normandy regions, Cineventure Sofica and the BNP Paribas Pictures Fund.

== Release ==
The film was selected to be screened in the Critics' Week section of the 76th Cannes Film Festival, where it had its world premiere on 20 May 2023. The film was theatrically released in France on 11 October 2023 by Diaphana Distribution. International sales are handled by Be for Films.

== Reception ==
=== Critical response ===
The Rapture received an average rating of 3.9 out of 5 stars on the French website AlloCiné, based on 30 reviews.

=== Accolades ===
Award	Date of ceremony	Category	Recipient(s)	Result	Ref.
Cannes Film Festival	27 May 2023 (Note: The award ceremony of the 62nd Critics' Week was held on 24 May 2024.)	Grand Prix – Critics' Week	The Rapture	Nominated	
Cannes Film Festival	27 May 2023	Prix SACD – Critics' Week	The Rapture	Won	
Cannes Film Festival	27 May 2023	Caméra d'Or	The Rapture	Nominated	
César Awards	23 February 2024	Best Actress	Hafsia Herzi	Nominated	
César Awards	23 February 2024	Best First Film	The Rapture	Nominated	
Louis Delluc Prize	6 December 2023	Best First Film	The Rapture	Won	
Lumière Awards	22 January 2024	Best Actress	Hafsia Herzi	Nominated	
Lumière Awards	22 January 2024	Best First Film	The Rapture	Won	
Lumière Awards	22 January 2024	Best Screenplay	Iris Kaltenbäck	Nominated	
