= The Second Act (film) =

2024 film by Quentin Dupieux

- Theatrical release poster
- French: Le Deuxième Acte
- Directed by: Quentin Dupieux
- Written by: Quentin Dupieux
- Produced by: Hugo Sélignac
- Starring: Léa Seydoux; Vincent Lindon; Louis Garrel; Raphaël Quenard; Manuel Guillot
- Cinematography: Quentin Dupieux
- Edited by: Quentin Dupieux
- Production companies: Chi-Fou-Mi Productions; Arte France Cinéma
- Distributed by: Diaphana Distribution
- Release date: 14 May 2024
- Running time: 80 minutes
- Country: France
- Language: French
- Box office: $3.8 million

The Second Act (French: Le Deuxième Acte) is a 2024 French absurdist comedy film written, shot, edited and directed by Quentin Dupieux. It stars Léa Seydoux, Vincent Lindon, Louis Garrel, Raphaël Quenard and Manuel Guillot. The plot follows a young woman who brings her boyfriend to meet her father. It is a meta-comedy about actors in a doomed film production.

The film had its world premiere as the opening film at the 2024 Cannes Film Festival on 14 May 2024 and was released theatrically in France on the same day by Diaphana Distribution.

== Plot ==
Florence wants to introduce David, the man she is madly in love with, to her father Guillaume. But David is not attracted to Florence and wants to get rid of her by throwing her into the arms of his friend Willy. The four characters meet in a restaurant in the middle of nowhere.

The film bounces between shots of the indie film being produced, to the actors breaking out from their lines to give commentary on the film and their lives as actors. This is often done seamlessly, and the film is most known for the long walk to the restaurant. A very long dolly track is used to capture these shots, impressively with no cuts.

During the long walk, David and Willy discuss David's dislike for Florence. They frequently argue during their lines, breaking out of their scene to discuss how not to be cancelled. Guillaume and Florence argue over quitting the film production, the point of acting in a world full or war, and what it means to be an actor. This commentary on modern life, technology, and the art of film-making is prevalent throughout the film. The punchline being the director is actually a flatly spoken AI, being held up on a laptop by a set runner.

== Cast ==
- Léa Seydoux as Florence Drucker
- Vincent Lindon as Guillaume Tardieu
- Louis Garrel as David
- Raphaël Quenard as Willy
- Manuel Guillot as Stéphane Jouvet

== Production ==
In January 2024, Léa Seydoux revealed in an interview with Télérama that she had recently completed two weeks of filming for an unannounced new film by Quentin Dupieux, then titled À notre beau métier ('To Our Beautiful Profession'), which would also star Vincent Lindon, Louis Garrel and Raphaël Quenard. Seydoux read the script in one sitting and quickly accepted the role out of admiration for Dupieux whom she described as an "extraordinary filmmaker" whose style of humour "hides an increasingly social depth, through imperfect and clumsy characters." She described the film as a mise en abyme about "actors who play in a lousy film" and confront their characters and lines, and appraised it as "crazy" and "very, very funny".

The Second Act was filmed entirely in the Dordogne department and more precisely in Périgord noir region, from 4 December to 22 December 2023. It was shot primarily at the aerodrome of Condat-sur-Vézère, a small private airfield still in operation. The existing airfield building, a former restaurant which has long been used for weddings, was converted over the course of a month by artisan craftsmen. The Atelier des fac-similés du Périgord (AFSP) in Montignac-Lascaux was involved in construction of the sets. The aerodrome's landing strip was disguised to give it the appearance of a lost highway. The production also filmed near the AFSP in Montignac-Lascaux. Thierry Bordes of Ciné Passion en Périgord, an association which supports film productions in Dordogne, claims that Dupieux has made "the longest tracking shot in the history of cinema" in The Second Act.

Production for the film was kept fully secret from beginning to end. The owner of the aereodrome, Roland Boissière, described the production as having the "greatest secrecy" and did not even know Vincent Lindon had come to film on his property. Hugo Sélignac produced the film through his company Chi-Fou-Mi Productions, It was co-produced by Arte France Cinéma.

== Release ==
The Second Act was selected to be the opening film at the 77th Cannes Film Festival, where it had its world premiere out-of-competition on 14 May 2024. It was released theatrically in France on the same day by Diaphana Distribution.

== Reception ==
The Second Act received an average rating of 3.8 out of 5 stars on the French website AlloCiné, based on 31 reviews. On Rotten Tomatoes, 74% of 38 critics gave the film a positive review, with an average rating of 6.5/10. On Metacritic, the film has a weighted average score of 57 out of 100, based on 12 critic reviews, indicating "mixed or average" reviews.

Peter Bradshaw of The Guardian gave the film three out of five stars and concluded his review with the remark: "Perhaps there is nothing much to The Second Act, but the soufflé of self-awareness rises tastily enough".
