= The Path of Excellence =

2023 drama film

- Promotional poster
- French: La Voie royale
- Directed by: Frédéric Mermoud
- Written by: Frédéric Mermoud; Salvatore Lista; Anton Likiernik
- Produced by: Véronique Zerdoun; Jean-Stéphane Bron; Lionel Baier
- Starring: Suzanne Jouannet; Marie Colomb; Maud Wyler
- Cinematography: Tristan Tortuyaux
- Edited by: Sarah Anderson
- Music by: Audrey Ismaël
- Production companies: Tabo Tabo Films; Bande à Part Film; Auvergne-Rhône-Alpes Cinéma
- Distributed by: Pyramide Distribution
- Release date: 3 August 2023 (Locarno)
- Running time: 109 minutes
- Countries: France; Switzerland
- Language: French
- Box office: $1,073,851

The Path of Excellence (French: La Voie royale) is a 2023 drama film directed by Frédéric Mermoud. It was written by Mermoud alongside Salvatore Lista and Anton Likiernik. It had its world premiere at the 76th Locarno Film Festival on 3 August 2023.

== Premise ==
Sophie, the daughter of a farming family, struggles to integrate into social life after enrolling in a classe préparatoire aux grandes écoles in Lyon.

== Cast ==
- Suzanne Jouannet as Sophie Vasseur
- Marie Colomb as Diane Le Goff
- Maud Wyler as Claire Fresnel, the physics teacher in the preparatory class
- Marilyne Canto as Caroline Vasseur, Sophie's mother
- Lorenzo Lefebvre as Hadrien Loiseau
- Cyril Metzger as Laurent Vasseur, Sophie's brother
- Alexandre Desrousseaux as Jules Couvreur
- Antoine Chappey as Gérard Vasseur, Sophie's father

== Production ==
The principal photography took place between October and November 2022 in Lyon and Paris. It also took place in Essonne, where a casting call for extras was published in early November.

== Release ==
The Path of Excellence had its world premiere at the 76th Locarno Film Festival on 3 August 2023 during the Piazza Grande section. The film was released in French cinema on 9 August 2023. It garnered 35,015 admissions in its first week of release. It achieved 157,671 admissions during its theatrical run.

== Reception ==
=== Critical reception ===
The Path of Excellence received an average rating of 3.6 out of 5 stars on the French website AlloCiné, based on 18 reviews.

=== Accolades ===
| Film festival or award | Date of ceremony | Category | Recipient(s) | Result | Ref. |
|---|---|---|---|---|---|
| Lumière Awards | 22 January 2024 | Best Female Revelation | Suzanne Jouannet | Nominated | |
| César Awards | 23 February 2024 | Best Female Revelation | Suzanne Jouannet | Nominated | |
| Swiss Film Awards | 22 March 2024 | Best Feature Film | The Path of Excellence | Nominated | |
| Swiss Film Awards | 22 March 2024 | Best Supporting Actress | Maud Wyler | Won | |
| Swiss Film Awards | 22 March 2024 | Best Screenplay | Frédéric Mermoud, Salvatore Lista, and Anton Likiernik | Nominated | |
| Swiss Film Awards | 22 March 2024 | Best Editing | Sarah Anderson | Nominated | |
