= 29th Lumière Awards =

2024 French film awards ceremony

- Date: 22 January 2024
- Site: Forum des images, Paris
- Hosted by: Pierre Zeni; Eve Jackson

Highlights
- Best Film: Anatomy of a Fall
- Best Actor: Arieh Worthalter; The Goldman Case
- Best Actress: Sandra Hüller; Anatomy of a Fall
- Most awards: Anatomy of a Fall (3)
- Most nominations: Anatomy of a Fall (6)

The 29th Lumière Awards ceremony, presented by the Académie des Lumières, took place on 22 January 2024 to honour the best in French-speaking cinema of 2023.

The nominations were announced on 14 December 2023. Anatomy of a Fall led the nominations with six, followed by The Animal Kingdom and The Goldman Case with five. Anatomy of a Fall won the most awards with three, including Best Film.

== Winners and nominees ==
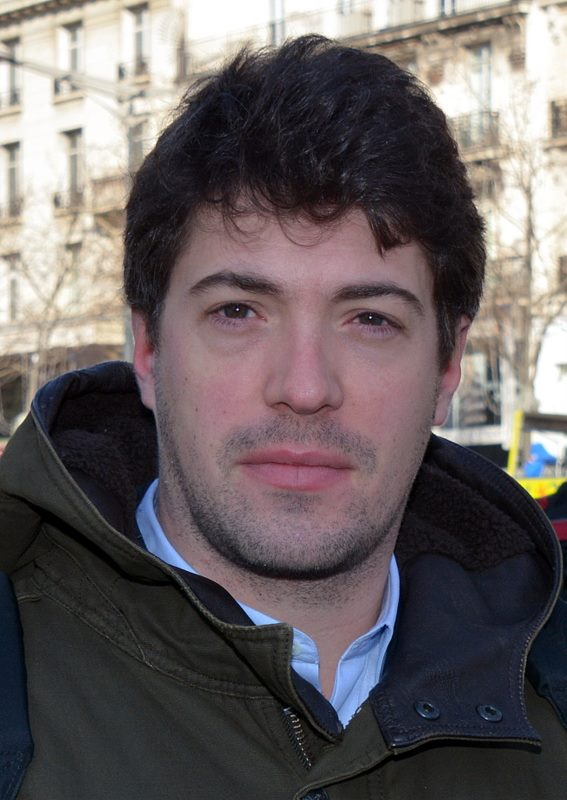
Thomas Cailley, Best Director winner

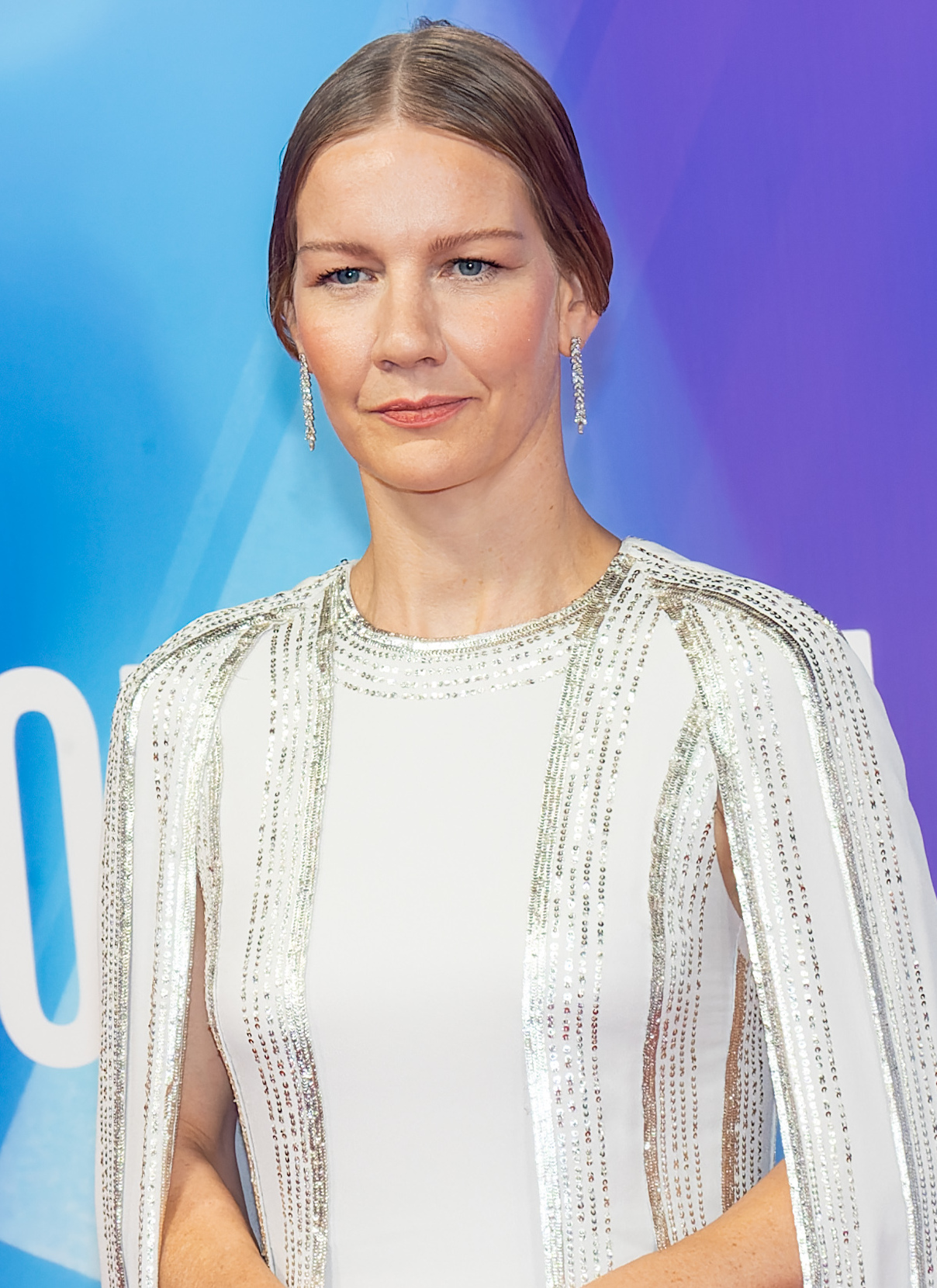
Sandra Hüller, Best Actress winner

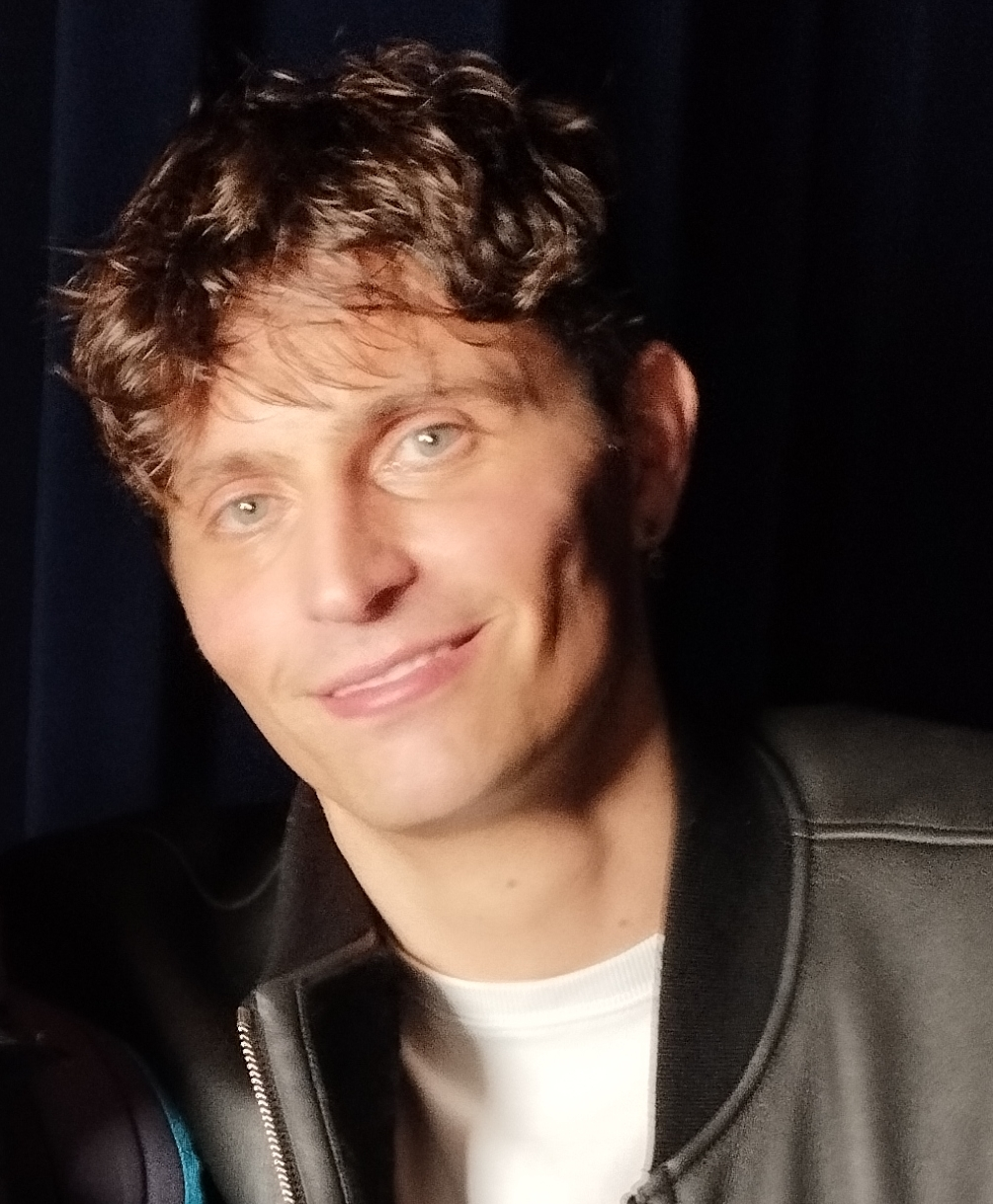
Raphaël Quenard, Best Male Revelation winner

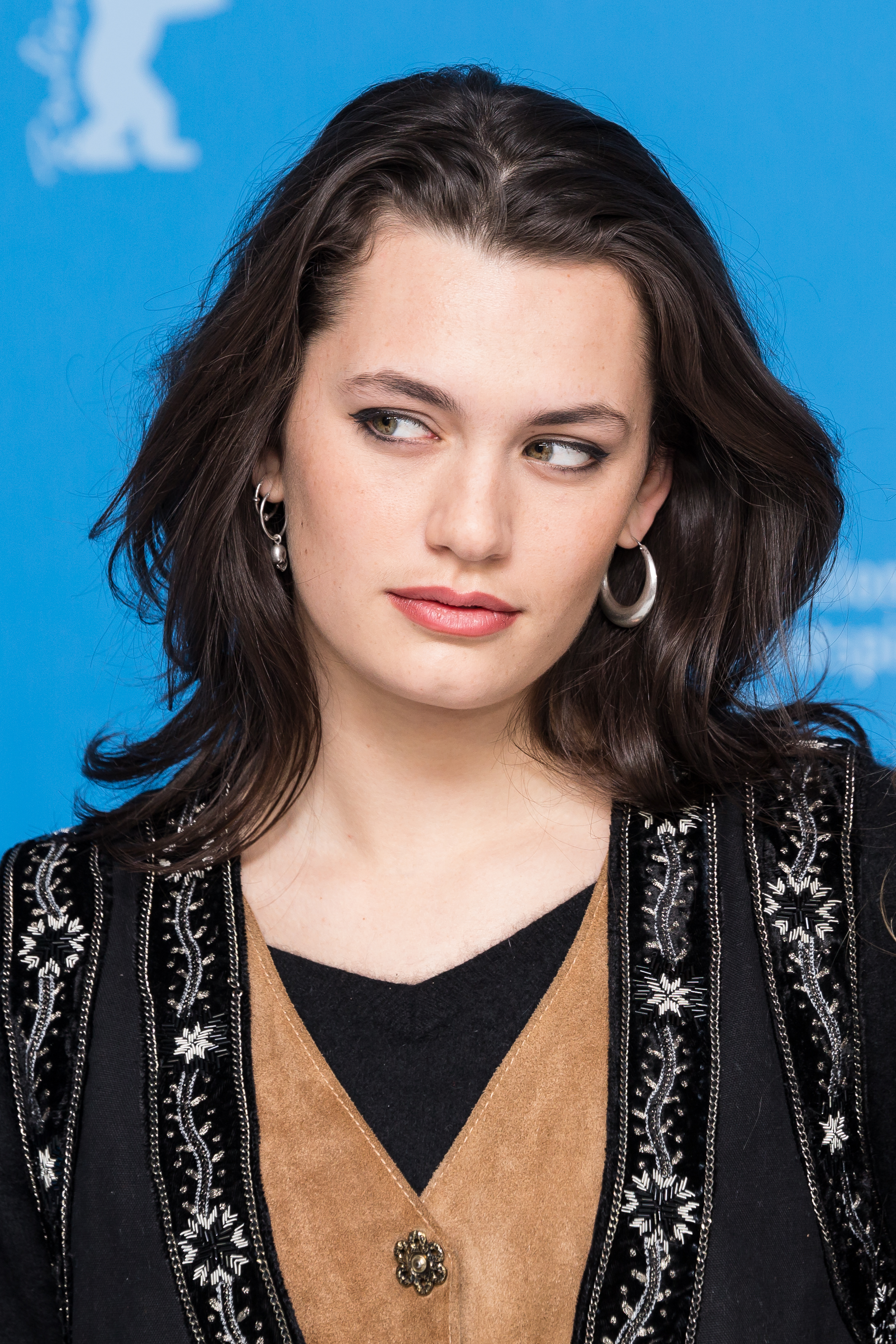
Ella Rumpf, Best Female Revelation winner

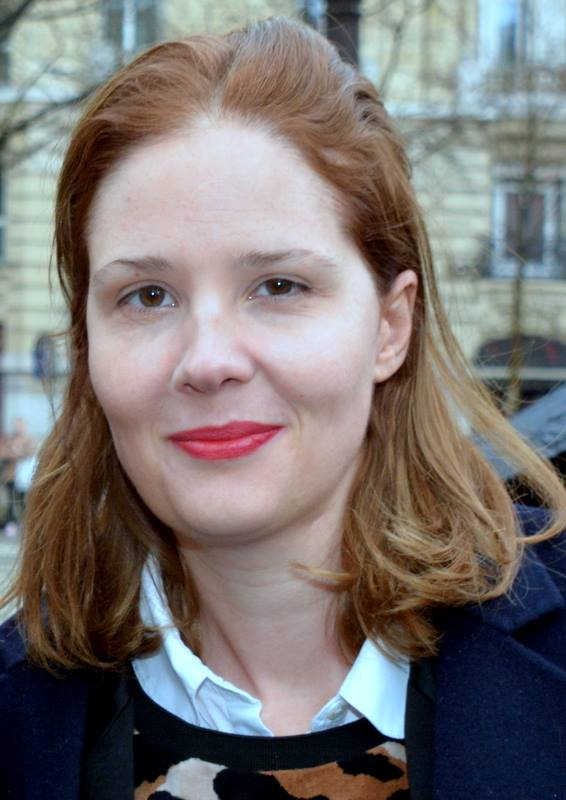
Justine Triet, Best Screenplay winner

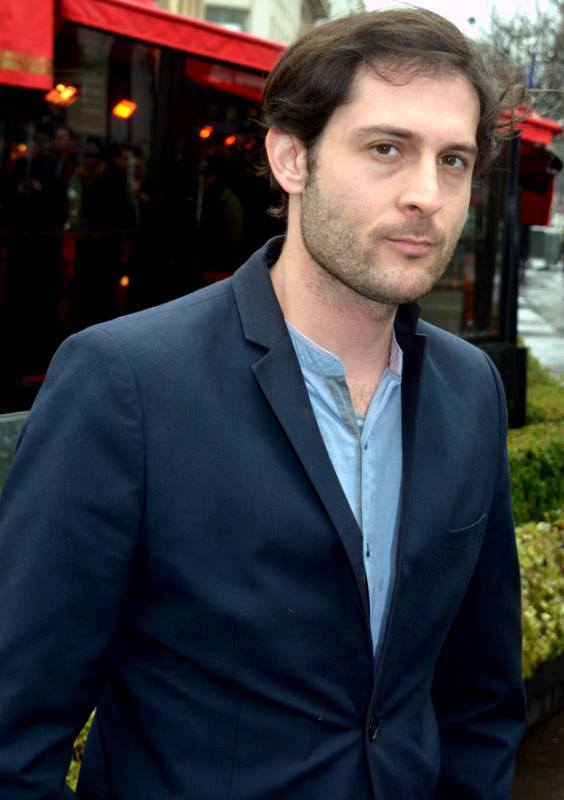
Arthur Harari, Best Screenplay winner

The nominations were announced on 14 December 2023. Winners are listed first, highlighted in boldface, and indicated with a double dagger (‡).

**Best Film**: **Anatomy of a Fall – Directed by Justine Triet**‡; Last Summer – Directed by Catherine Breillat; Sons of Ramses – Directed by Clément Cogitore; The Goldman Case – Directed by Cédric Kahn; The Animal Kingdom – Directed by Thomas Cailley	**Best Director**: **Thomas Cailley – The Animal Kingdom**‡; Catherine Breillat – Last Summer; Clément Cogitore – Sons of Ramses; Cédric Kahn – The Goldman Case; Justine Triet – Anatomy of a Fall
**Best Actor**: **Arieh Worthalter – The Goldman Case as Pierre Goldman**‡; Vincent Lacoste – Along Came Love as François Delambre; Karim Leklou – Vincent Must Die as Vincent Borel; Melvil Poupaud – Just the Two of Us as Grégoire Lamoureux; Franz Rogowski – Disco Boy as Aleksei	**Best Actress**: **Sandra Hüller – Anatomy of a Fall as Sandra Voyter**‡; Catherine Deneuve – Bernadette as Bernadette Chirac; Léa Drucker – Last Summer as Anne; Virginie Efira – All to Play For as Sylvie Paugam; Hafsia Herzi – The Rapture as Lydia
**Best Male Revelation**: **Raphaël Quenard – Junkyard Dog as Antoine Miralès**‡; Arthur Harari – The Goldman Case as Maître Georges Kiejman; Samuel Kircher – Last Summer as Théo; Milo Machado-Graner – Anatomy of a Fall as Daniel Maleski; Abdulah Sissoko – Le Jeune Imam as Ali	**Best Female Revelation**: **Ella Rumpf – Marguerite's Theorem as Marguerite Hoffmann**‡; Suzanne Jouannet – The Path of Excellence as Sophie Vasseur; Louise Mauroy-Panzani – Àma Gloria as Cléo; Park Ji-min – Return to Seoul as Freddie Benoît; Claire Pommet – Spirit of Ecstasy as Jeanne Francœur
**Best First Film**: **The Rapture – Iris Kaltenbäck**‡; Bernadette – Léa Domenach; Disco Boy – Giacomo Abbruzzese; Junkyard Dog – Jean-Baptiste Durand; Vincent Must Die – Stéphan Castang	**Best Screenplay**: **Anatomy of a Fall – Justine Triet and Arthur Harari**‡; The Animal Kingdom – Thomas Cailley; The Goldman Case – Cédric Kahn and Nathalie Hertzberg; The Rapture – Iris Kaltenbäck; Yannick – Quentin Dupieux
**Best Cinematography**: **The Taste of Things – Jonathan Ricquebourg**‡; Anatomy of a Fall – Simon Beaufils; The Animal Kingdom – David Cailley; Disco Boy – Hélène Louvart; Sons of Ramses – Sylvain Verdet	**Best Music**: **Disco Boy – Vitalic**‡; The Animal Kingdom – Andrea Laszlo De Simone; Chicken for Linda! – Clément Ducol; Four Daughters – Amine Bouhafa; The Mountain – Chloé Thévenin
**Best Documentary**: **Four Daughters – Kaouther Ben Hania**‡; Little Girl Blue – Mona Achache; On the Adamant – Nicolas Philibert; Our Body – Claire Simon; La Rivière – Dominique Marchais	**Best Animated Film**: **Chicken for Linda! – Chiara Malta and Sébastien Laudenbach**‡; Blind Willow, Sleeping Woman – Pierre Földes; Mars Express – Jérémie Périn; No Dogs or Italians Allowed – Alain Ughetto; The Siren – Sepideh Farsi
**Best International Co-Production**: **About Dry Grasses (Turkey, France, Germany) – Nuri Bilge Ceylan**‡; The Blue Caftan (Morocco, France, Belgium, Denmark) – Maryam Touzani; Hounds (Morocco, France, Belgium) – Kamal Lazraq; Lost Country (Serbia, France) – Vladimir Perišić; The Old Oak (United Kingdom, France, Belgium) – Ken Loach

=== Films with multiple nominations and awards ===
Films with multiple nominations
Nominations	Film
6	Anatomy of a Fall
5	The Animal Kingdom
5	The Goldman Case
4	Disco Boy
4	Last Summer
3	The Rapture
3	Sons of Ramses
2	Bernadette
2	Chicken for Linda!
2	Four Daughters
2	Junkyard Dog
2	Vincent Must Die

Films with multiple wins
Wins	Film
3	Anatomy of a Fall

== See also ==
- 96th Academy Awards
- 77th British Academy Film Awards
- 49th César Awards
- 69th David di Donatello
- 36th European Film Awards
- 81st Golden Globe Awards
- 38th Goya Awards
- 13th Magritte Awards
