= Raphaël Quenard =

French actor (born 1991)

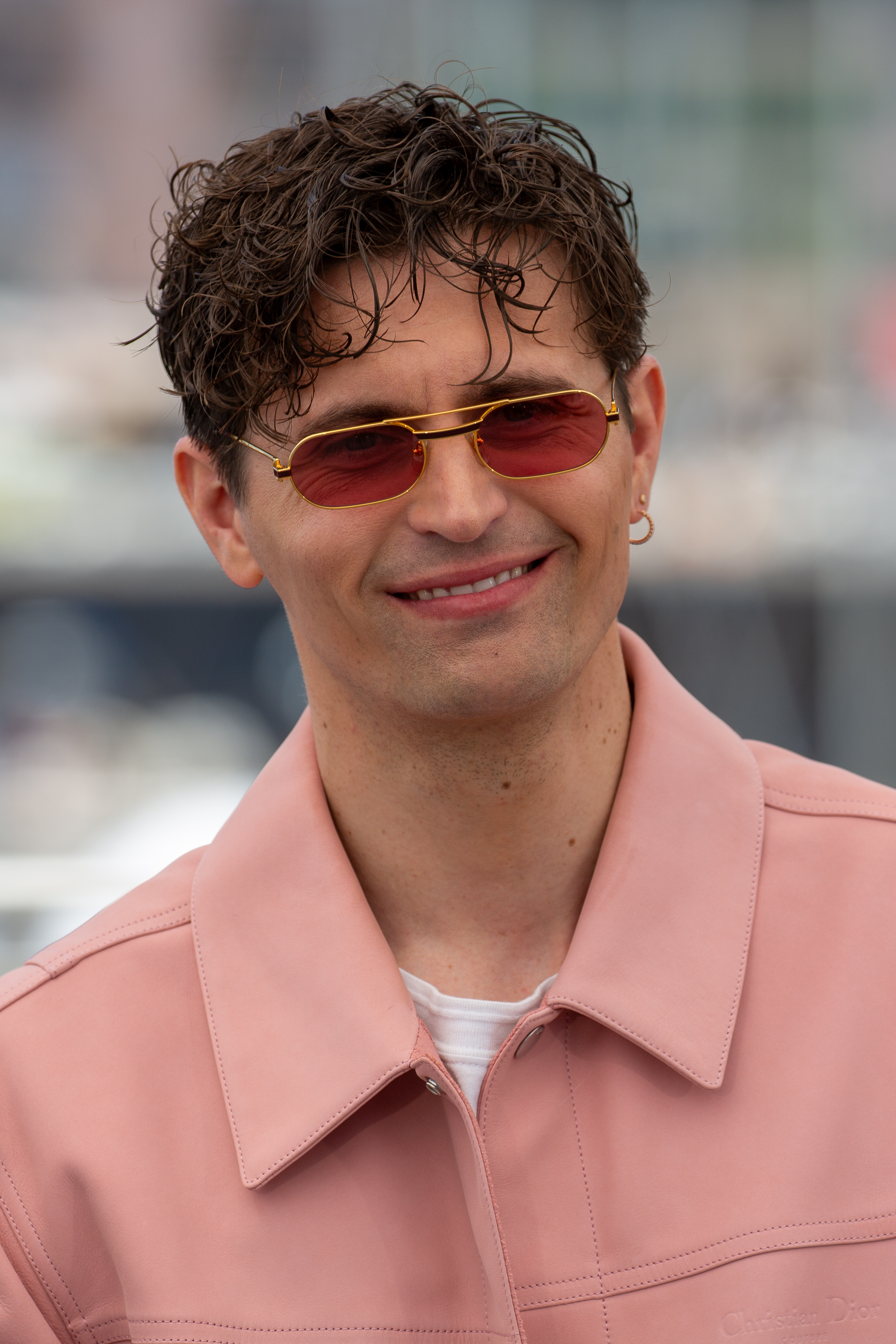
- Quenard at the 2025 Cannes Film Festival
- Born: 16 May 1991 (age 35); Échirolles, France
- Education: Chimie ParisTech - PSL
- Occupation: Actor
- Years active: 2014–present

Raphaël Quenard (French: [ʁafaɛl kənaʁ]; born 16 May 1991) is a French actor. After starring in small-scale short films and television productions as well as a variety of supporting film roles, Quenard earned acclaim for his breakthrough performances in Junkyard Dog (2023) and Yannick (2023). He received 3 nominations at the 49th César Awards, including Best Actor for Yannick, and won Best Male Revelation for Junkyard Dog.

== Early life and education ==
Raphaël Quenard was born on 16 May 1991 in Échirolles, a banlieue located south of Grenoble. His father was a researcher who studied thermal conductivity and his mother was a worker for the insurance company MACIF. Quenard spent his childhood in the commune of Gières, located to the east of Grenoble.

Quenard was a good student and earned a baccalauréat S (scientifique). Wishing to follow in the footsteps of his grandfather who had a distinguished career in the military, Quenard entered the École des Pupilles de l'Air, a military training academy in Montbonnot-Saint-Martin, where he prepared for enrollment in a grande école. However, he quickly left to study chemistry. Between 2012 and 2013, Quenard was a visiting researcher at Imperial College London. In 2014, he graduated with a grande école diploma from the Chimie ParisTech, PSL University. For six months, he worked as a parliamentary assistant to Bernadette Laclais, then a member of the Socialist Party, who served as deputy for Savoie's 4th constituency in the National Assembly.

== Career ==
=== 2019–2022: Early roles ===
Raphaël Quenard began his acting career in Paris as a student of Jean-Laurent Cochet, who, interested in the potential of the young actor, welcomed him into his classes for free. Quenard then appeared in several amateur short films and joined Houda Benyamina's 1000 Visages association, which promotes the integration of disadvantaged young people into the world of cinema. He first met Emma Benestan while in a workshop hosted by the director. She directed him in her 2019 short film L'Amour du risque, then in her 2021 feature-length debut Fragile. On the set, he met cinematographer Émilie Noblet who advised him to audition for the series HP. Quenard landed the role of the manic-depressive intern Jimmy in the series, which was broadcast for two seasons on OCS from 2018 to 2020.

Quenard made his feature film debut as a physics teacher in Bertrand Bonello's Zombi Child. In 2020, he starred in a lead role in Élie Girard's short film Les Mauvais Garçons, which won Best Fiction Short Film at the 47th César Awards. He followed it with small roles in several features, including Quentin Dupieux's Mandibles (2020) and Smoking Causes Coughing (2022), Michel Hazanavicius's Final Cut (2022) Jacques Audiard's Paris, 13th District (2021), and Cédric Jimenez's November (2022). In 2021, he was featured in the third season of the Netflix series Family Business.

=== 2023–present: Breakthrough and acclaim ===
In 2023, Quenard established himself as a leading screen actor, first with his interpretation of Mirales, one of the main characters in Jean-Baptiste Durand's feature-length debut film Junkyard Dog. Alongside Anthony Bajon and Galatea Bellugi, he portrayed a young man who confronts boredom, crime, friendship and jealousy in the countryside in Hérault. Quenard fought to obtain the role by attending screenings of Durand's short films and writing him several messages on Facebook, in order to be able to meet him. Although it sold a modest 83,000 admissions in France, Junkyard Dog received unanimous critical acclaim. That same year, Quenard played the title role in Quentin Dupieux's black comedy Yannick, about a disappointed audience member who heckles a mediocre stage production in Paris and proceeds to take the entire theatre hostage and rewrite the play under his own direction. Yannick was a commercial and critical success, selling over 200,000 admissions in its first two weeks at the box office. Quenard also appeared in Jeanne Herry's ensemble drama All Your Faces.

In 2024, he received the Lumière Award for Best Male Revelation for his performance in Junkyard Dog (2023). He also received three nominations at the 49th César Awards, including Best Actor (for Yannick) and Best Documentary Short Film as director and producer of L'Acteur, ou la surprenante vertu de l'incompréhension, and won Best Male Revelation (for Junkyard Dog).

Quenard stars in Gilles Lellouche's romantic comedy musical film Beating Hearts, which was released in 2024 and in which he plays alongside François Civil, Adèle Exarchopoulos, Alain Chabat and Benoît Poelvoorde. Quenard also starred in a new film by Quentin Dupieux, The Second Act, which includes Léa Seydoux, Vincent Lindon and Louis Garrel. In June 2024, it was announced that Quenard would star in the role of singer Johnny Hallyday in a biographical film directed by Cédric Jimenez. He was chosen by Hallyday's widow Laeticia.

== Other activities ==
In 2025, Quenard published his debut novel, Clamser à Tataouine, through Flammarion on 14 May.

In 2026, Quenard served on the jury of the Biarritz Film Festival – Nouvelles Vagues, presided over by Kristen Stewart.

== Personal life ==
Raphaël Quenard has been distinguished for his pronounced working-class provincial accent, which critics have noted as being difficult to place geographically. When questioned about his "accent" by Yann Barthès on Quotidien, Quenard explained: "It's my voice. What you hear is not an accent, it's a slightly displaced nasal septum which gives a sort of timbre of having the cold". Numéro called it a "a disconcerting accent, one which rejects all forms of academicism".

== Filmography ==
=== Feature films ===
| Year | Title | Role | Notes |
|---|---|---|---|
| 2019 | Zombi Child | Physics teacher | |
| 2020 | Mama Weed | Mika | |
| 2020 | Mandibles | Raimondo | |
| 2020 | The Third War (La Troisième Guerre) | Dimo | |
| 2020 | Gagarine | Trompettiste | |
| 2020 | Rascal (Vaurien) | Policier de la BAC | |
| 2021 | Paris, 13th District | Jeff | |
| 2021 | Hard Shell, Soft Shell (Fragile) | Raphaël | |
| 2022 | Final Cut | Jonathan Mental / Akira | |
| 2022 | Smoking Causes Coughing | Max | |
| 2022 | November | Rudy | |
| 2022 | SOS: Save our School (La cour des miracles) | Mickaël | |
| 2022 | My Sole Desire (À mon seul désir) | Man at the bachelor party | |
| 2023 | Junkyard Dog | Antoine Mirales | |
| 2023 | All Your Faces | Benjamin Delarme | |
| 2023 | Jeanne du Barry | Le Grand Chambellan | |
| 2023 | CASH | Daniel Sauveur | |
| 2023 | The Fantastic Three (Les Trois Fantastiques) | Seb | |
| 2023 | A Wonderful Girl (Sur la branche) | Christophe Ajam | |
| 2023 | Yannick | Yannick | |
| 2023 | Sentinelle | Captain Rémi Morisset | |
| 2024 | The Second Act | Willy | |
| 2024 | Beating Hearts | Kiki | |
| 2024 | A Smile Doesn't Lie (Pourquoi tu souris ?) | Jérôme Bouthier | |
| 2024 | The Ties That Bind Us | David | |
| 2024 | Conte nuptial | Micka | Also dialogue writer |
| 2025 | I Love Peru | Raphaël | Also co-director and screenwriter |

=== Short films ===
| Year | Title | Role | Director | Notes |
|---|---|---|---|---|
| 2014 | Je suis transmissible | Fabien | Alexandre Ekambi | |
| 2018 | West Pier | | Lou Cheruy Zidi | |
| 2018 | Le ciel est clair | Kevin | Marie Rosselet-Ruiz | |
| 2019 | Koala | Raphaël | Lyes Kaouah | Also screenwriter |
| 2019 | L'Amour du risque | | Emma Benestan | |
| 2019 | On a marché sur la terre | Isidore | Xavier Delagnes | |
| 2019 | Tinder surprise | Martin | Rodolphe Bouquet | |
| 2020 | Fatale Orientale | Photographe | Holy Fatma | |
| 2020 | Les Mauvais Garçons | Guillaume | Élie Girard | |
| 2020 | Les baleines ne savent pas nager | Mr. Casanas | Matthieu Ruyssen | |
| 2020 | Ailleurs | Le militaire | Théo Gottlieb | |
| 2021 | Conte nuptial | Micka | Claire Bonnefoy | |
| 2022 | Notre doctrine | Formateur | Damien Salama | |
| 2022 | Mantra | Paul | Pascal Bourelier and Stef Meyer | |
| 2022 | Creuse | Marc | Guillaume Scaillet | |
| 2023 | L'Acteur, ou la surprenante vertu de l'incompréhension | Himself | Hugo David and Raphaël Quenard | Documentary short; also director, producer, screenwriter |
| 2025 | Olivia | | Ben Richardot | Also screenwriter |

=== Television ===
| Year | Title | Role | Notes |
|---|---|---|---|
| 2018–2020 | HP | Jimmy | 20 episodes |
| 2019 | À l'intérieur | Dan Glossier | 6 episodes |
| 2019 | La part du soupçon | Flavin | TV movie |
| 2019 | Si tu vois ma mère | JC | TV movie |
| 2019 | Le crime lui va si bien | Le gendarme | Episode: "Intime Conviction" |
| 2020 | ON K'AIR | Gwendal | 3 episodes |
| 2021 | Family Business | Léonard | Season 3 |
| 2022 | Le Monde de demain | Philippe Puydoby (Epic) | Episode: "Saint-Denis sur Seine" |
| 2024 | Je ne me laisserai plus faire | Yann | TV movie |

== Accolades ==
| Award | Date of ceremony | Category | Film | Result | Ref. |
|---|---|---|---|---|---|
| Cabourg Film Festival | 18 June 2023 | Swann d'or de la révélation masculine | Junkyard Dog | Won | |
| César Awards | 23 February 2024 | Best Actor | Yannick | Nominated | |
| César Awards | 23 February 2024 | Best Male Revelation | Junkyard Dog | Won | |
| César Awards | 23 February 2024 | Best Documentary Short Film | L'Acteur | Nominated | |
| Festival Côté Court de Pantin | 23 June 2021 | Best Actor | Les Mauvais Garçons | Won | |
| Festival du premier film francophone de La Ciotat Berceau du cinéma | 11 June 2023 | Best Actor (shared with Anthony Bajon) | Junkyard Dog | Won | |
| International Cinephile Society | 11 February 2024 | Best Breakthrough Performance | Junkyard Dog | Nominated | |
| Lumière Awards | 22 January 2024 | Best Male Revelation | Junkyard Dog | Won | |
| Monte-Carlo Television Festival | 18 June 2019 | Nymphe d'or du meilleur acteur dans une série comique | HP | Nominated | |
| Paris Film Critics Association Awards | 4 February 2024 | Best Male Revelation | Junkyard Dog | Won | |
| Paris Film Critics Association Awards | 4 February 2024 | Best Supporting Actor | Junkyard Dog | Nominated | |
| Paris Film Critics Association Awards | 4 February 2024 | Best Actor | Yannick | Nominated | |

== Works ==
=== Novels ===
- Clamser à Tataouine, novel, Flammarion, 2025 ISBN 2080471023
