= Chi-Fou-Mi Productions =

French film production company

- Type: Subsidiary
- Industry: Films
- Founded: February 3, 2010; 16 years ago
- Founders: Hugo Sélignac
- Headquarters: Paris, France
- Area served: Worldwide
- Products: La Marche; Blood Ties; Le Grand Bain; BAC Nord
- Parent: Mediawan

Chi-Fou-Mi Productions is a film production company founded by Hugo Sélignac on February 3, 2010. The company has received 25 César Award nominations and won a César for Best Actor, awarded to Philippe Katerine for his role in Le Grand Bain.

== History ==
On August 15, 2005, at the age of 21, Hugo Sélignac — son of director Arnaud Sélignac, Antonine Catzeflis, and stepson of Étienne Chatiliez — was granted 24 hours to film a scene on the Paris ring road for Guillaume Canet’s movie Tell No One. This exceptional permission was given by Nicolas Sarkozy, then Minister of the Interior, through Pierre Sarkozy, with whom Hugo Sélignac had a personal connection.

In 2013, La Marche became Chi-Fou-Mi Productions' first feature film. The movie, which recounts a historical anti-racism march in France, received backing from political figures such as François Hollande (who organized a screening at the Élysée Palace) and Bertrand Delanoë at City Hall.

A controversy arose from the release of the song Marche by rapper Nekfeu in connection with the movie. The track contained the line: "Je réclame un autodafé pour ces chiens de Charlie Hebdo". The lyric was viewed as provocative, especially since Al-Qaeda had issued a fatwa against Charb, one of the cartoonists of Charlie Hebdo, just months earlier. Sélignac later clarified that he did not intend to include the song in the film’s official soundtrack but agreed to use the same typography for the album cover and the film’s poster. He defended freedom of expression for both the rappers and Charlie Hebdo.

His wife, Emma Reynaud, founder of the Marcia fashion brand, made a cameo appearance in the film.

In 2014, Hugo Sélignac co-founded Chi-Fou-Mi Records, a music publishing company, with Raphaël Hamburger.

In 2021, the company produced En passant pécho, a film of Julien Hollande, the son of former French President François Hollande. The movie was heavily criticized and released directly on Netflix. That same year, Chi-Fou-Mi Productions joined the Mediawan Group.

In 2022, a controversy erupted surrounding the film November, directed by Cédric Jimenez and produced by Chi-Fou-Mi Productions. The film recounts the November 2015 Paris attacks, focusing on the investigation that led to the neutralization of Abdelhamid Abaaoud, the mastermind behind the attacks. A key witness, who lives under a protected identity, expressed outrage after being portrayed wearing a hijab in the film, something she does not wear in real life. Her lawyer, Samia Maktouf, filed a lawsuit against the producers. The film was ultimately released with a disclaimer at the beginning, addressing the matter.

Following this, actor Tahar Rahim introduced Hugo Sélignac to Julien Colonna, son of the Corsican gangster Jean-Jérôme Colonna, leading to the production of Colonna’s debut film, Le Royaume.

In 2024, the film L'Amour ouf (Beating hearts), directed by Gilles Lellouche, nearly reached 5 million admissions in France. Sélignac described the film as a mix between The Notebook and Once Upon a Time in America.

== Filmography ==
=== Feature films ===
- 2013: Blood Ties
- 2013: The Marchers
- 2014: Number One Fan
- 2018: Le Grand Bain
- 2018: Mon Ket
- 2018: Carnivores
- 2018: The World Is Yours
- 2018: Pupille
- 2019: The Wolf's Call
- 2021: Mandibles
- 2021: En passant pécho
- 2021: BAC Nord
- 2022: November
- 2022: Smoking Causes Coughing
- 2023: Toni, en famille
- 2023: All Your Faces
- 2023: Yannick
- 2023: Omar la fraise
- 2024: Ni chaînes ni maîtres
- 2024: Golo et Ritchie
- 2024: The Second Act
- 2024: Beating Hearts
- 2024: And Their Children After Them
- 2024: Le Royaume
- 2025: Out of Love
- 2025: Dog 51
- 2025: The Piano Accident
- Upcoming:
  - 2025: Signaux
  - 2025: L'Échappée
  - 2025: African Dream
  - 2027: Johnny

=== Television ===
- 2023: Nouveaux Riches (Netflix)
- 2023: A Place to Fight For (Disney Plus)
