= All Your Faces =

2023 drama film

- Theatrical release poster
- French: Je verrai toujours vos visages
- Literally: I Will Always See Your Faces
- Directed by: Jeanne Herry
- Written by: Jeanne Herry
- Produced by: Hugo Sélignac; Alain Attal
- Starring: Birane Ba; Leïla Bekhti; Dali Benssalah; Élodie Bouchez; Suliane Brahim; Jean-Pierre Darroussin; Adèle Exarchopoulos; Gilles Lellouche; Miou-Miou; Denis Podalydès; Fred Testot
- Cinematography: Nicolas Loir
- Edited by: Francis Vesin
- Music by: Pascal Sangla
- Production companies: Chi-Fou-Mi Productions; Trésor Films; StudioCanal; France 3 Cinéma
- Distributed by: StudioCanal
- Release date: 29 March 2023
- Running time: 118 minutes
- Country: France
- Language: French
- Box office: $9.1 million

All Your Faces (French: Je verrai toujours vos visages, lit. 'I Will Always See Your Faces') is a 2023 French drama film written and directed by Jeanne Herry. It stars an ensemble cast, which includes Birane Ba, Leïla Bekhti, Dali Benssalah, Élodie Bouchez, Suliane Brahim, Jean-Pierre Darroussin, Adèle Exarchopoulos, Gilles Lellouche, Miou-Miou, Denis Podalydès and Fred Testot.

It was released in France on 29 March 2023. It received nine nominations at the 49th César Awards, with Exarchopoulos winning for Best Supporting Actress.

== Premise ==
The film explores the practice of restorative justice, which was introduced into the French criminal justice system in 2014. Restorative justice offers victims and perpetrators of offences to engage in mediated dialogue, supervised by professionals and volunteers.

== Cast ==
- Birane Ba as Issa
- Leïla Bekhti as Nawelle
- Dali Benssalah as Nassim
- Élodie Bouchez as Judith
- Suliane Brahim as Fanny
- Jean-Pierre Darroussin as Michel
- Adèle Exarchopoulos as Chloé Delarme
- Gilles Lellouche as Grégoire
- Miou-Miou as Sabine
- Denis Podalydès as Paul
- Fred Testot as Thomas
- Anne Benoît as Yvette
- Raphaël Quenard as Benjamin Delarme
- Sébastien Houbani as Mehdi
- Catherine Arditi as Chloé's grandmother

== Release ==
The film was distributed in France by StudioCanal on 29 March 2023.

== Reception ==
=== Box office ===
All Your Faces grossed $9.0 million in France, and $86,925 in Spain, for a worldwide total of $9.1 million.

In France, the film opened alongside Shazam! Fury of the Gods, Bonne Conduite, Apaches and The Lost King. The film sold 43,031 admissions on its first day, 17,357 of which were preview screenings. It went on to sell 225,409 admissions in its opening weekend, finishing 3rd at the box office. At the end of its theatrical run, the film sold a total of 1,165,205 admissions.

=== Critical response ===
All Your Faces received an average rating of 4.1 out of 5 stars on the French website AlloCiné, based on 35 reviews. On the review aggregator website Rotten Tomatoes, 100% of 8 critics' reviews are positive.

Éric Neuhoff of Le Figaro wrote that director Jeanne Herry tackled the topic of restorative justice with a "firmness and honesty" and "orchestrates a fascinating dialogue between victims and offenders".

=== Accolades ===
| Award | Date of ceremony | Category | Recipient(s) | Result | Ref. |
|---|---|---|---|---|---|
| César Awards | 23 February 2024 | Best Film | All Your Faces | Nominated | |
| César Awards | 23 February 2024 | Best Director | Jeanne Herry | Nominated | |
| César Awards | 23 February 2024 | Best Supporting Actress | Leïla Bekhti | Nominated | |
| César Awards | 23 February 2024 | Best Supporting Actress | Élodie Bouchez | Nominated | |
| César Awards | 23 February 2024 | Best Supporting Actress | Adèle Exarchopoulos | Won | |
| César Awards | 23 February 2024 | Best Supporting Actress | Miou-Miou | Nominated | |
| César Awards | 23 February 2024 | Best Original Screenplay | Jeanne Herry | Nominated | |
| César Awards | 23 February 2024 | Best Editing | Francis Vesin | Nominated | |
| César Awards | 23 February 2024 | Best Sound | Rémi Daru, Guadalupe Cassius, Loïc Prian and Marc Doisne | Nominated | |
