= Bernadette (film) =

2023 film by Léa Domenach

- Theatrical release poster
- Directed by: Léa Domenach
- Screenplay by: Clémence Dargent; Léa Domenach
- Produced by: Fabrice Goldstein; Antoine Rein
- Starring: Catherine Deneuve; Denis Podalydès; Michel Vuillermoz; Sara Giraudeau
- Cinematography: Elin Kirschfink
- Edited by: Christel Dewynter
- Music by: Anne-Sophie Versnaeyen
- Production companies: Karé Productions; France 3 Cinéma; Marvelous Productions; Umedia
- Distributed by: Warner Bros. Pictures
- Release dates: 17 September 2023 (Helvetia French Film Festival); 4 October 2023 (France)
- Running time: 95 minutes
- Country: France
- Language: French
- Box office: $6.7 million

Bernadette (released as The President's Wife in the United States) is a 2023 French biographical comedy-drama film co-written and directed by Léa Domenach in her directorial debut. The film stars Catherine Deneuve in title role of Bernadette Chirac, French politician and the widow of the former president Jacques Chirac, with Denis Podalydès, Michel Vuillermoz and Sara Giraudeau in supporting roles. It was released in cinemas in France on 4 October 2023 by Warner Bros. Pictures.

== Synopsis ==
The film follows Bernadette Chirac (Catherine Deneuve), during the two presidential mandates of her husband, Jacques Chirac (Michel Vuillermoz), from 1995 until the election of Nicolas Sarkozy in 2007.

== Cast ==
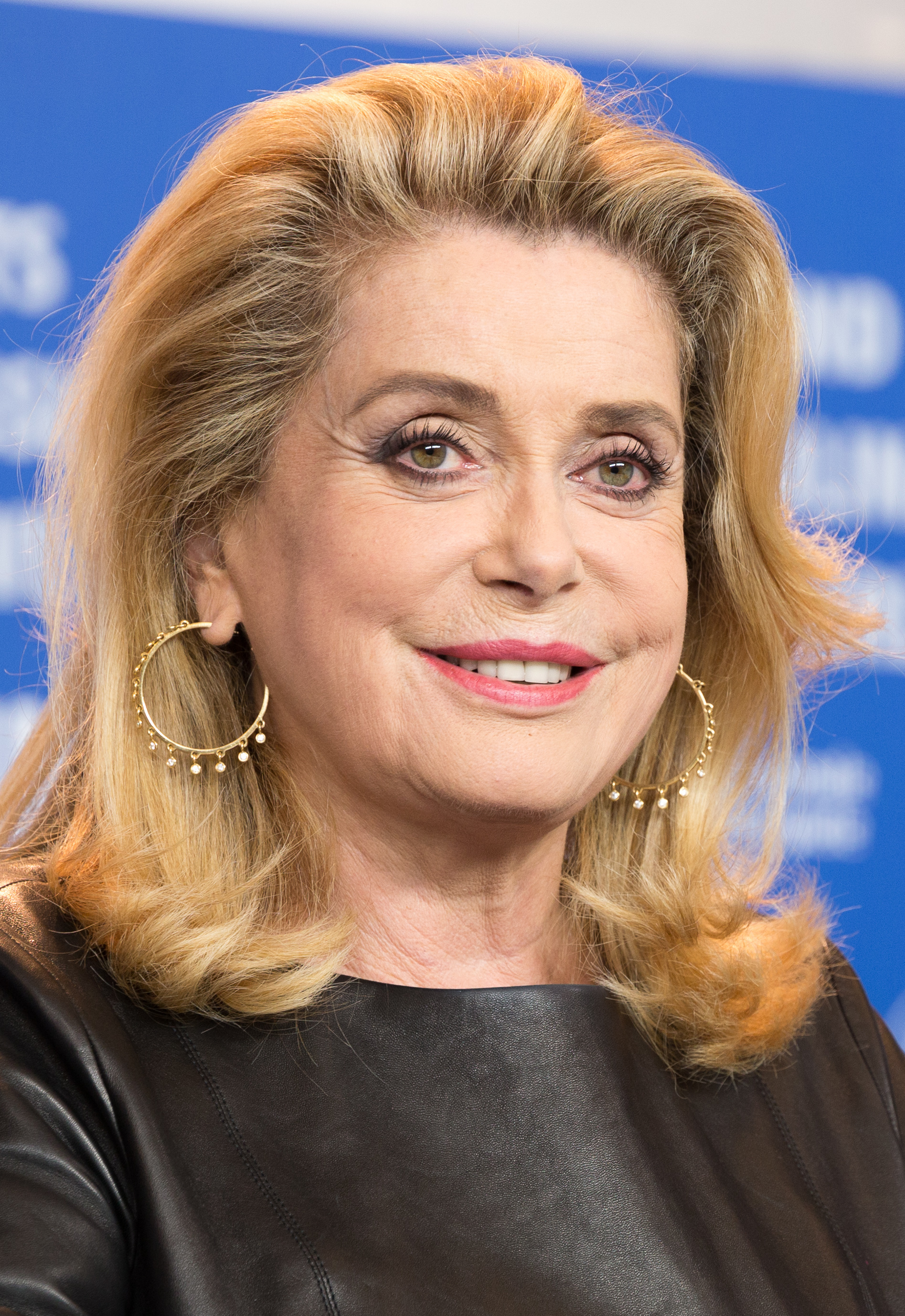
Catherine Deneuve in 2017

- Catherine Deneuve as Bernadette Chirac
- Denis Podalydès as Bernard Niquet
- Michel Vuillermoz as Jacques Chirac
- Sara Giraudeau as Claude Chirac
- Laurent Stocker as Nicolas Sarkozy
- François Vincentelli as Dominique de Villepin
- Lionel Abelanski as Yvon Molinier, the chauffeur
- Artus as David Douillet
- Scali Delpeyrat as Jacky-Pierre
- Barbara Schulz as Aurora
- Vincent Primault as Xavier Bertrand
- Olivier Balazuc as Alain
- Maud Wyler as Laurence Chirac
- Jacky Nercessian as Father Mouret
- Olivier Breitman as Karl Lagerfeld
- Patrick Paroux as Master Grundmann
- Stéphane Boucher as the Val-de-Grâce doctor

== Production ==
In April 2022, it was announced that Catherine Deneuve would play Bernadette Chirac in a biographical film entitled La Tortue. This is the first feature film directed by Léa Domenach.

Filming began on 25 April 2022 in Reims, Épernay, Châlons-en-Champagne and Paris. It was wrapped up on 27 June 2022.

== Release ==
Orange Studio unveiled first footage of the film at the Unifrance Rendez-Vous in Paris in January 2023.

The film had its premiere at the Helvetia French Film Festival on 17 September 2023. It was released in France and Belgium on 4 October 2023. It was released in the Czech Republic on 30 November by Bohemia Motion Pictures.

On 17 February 2024, it was announced that Cohen Media Group had acquired the film rights for Bernadette (retitled The President's Wife) for a North America release. The film began running in theaters across the US 18 April 2025. It was released on Blu-ray, DVD, and digital on 24 June 2025.

== Reception ==
=== Box office ===
Bernadette topped the first weekend at French box office with the collection of US$1.6 million, and 267,041 admissions.

The film grossed US$6,700,077 worldwide.

=== Critical response ===
On the AlloCiné, which lists 32 press reviews, the film obtained an average rating of 3.4/5.

Olivier Pélisson rated the film 4/5 for Bande à part and wrote, "A tasty comedy, Léa Domenach's first feature film is a successful cross between an offbeat biopic and a portrait of a woman who asserts herself." Camille Nevers rated the film with 1/5 and wrote, "The interest of this pochade produced with imperturbable softness by Léa Domenach [...] lies in the fact that it is the rare specimen of its time: we have the first officially Macronist film."

=== Accolades ===
| Award | Date of ceremony | Category | Recipient(s) | Result | Ref. |
|---|---|---|---|---|---|
| César Awards | 23 February 2024 | Best First Feature Film | Bernadette | Nominated | |
| Lumière Awards | 22 January 2024 | Best Actress | Catherine Deneuve | Nominated | |
| Lumière Awards | 22 January 2024 | Best First Film | Bernadette | Nominated | |
| Paris Film Critics Association Awards | 4 February 2024 | Best Actress | Catherine Deneuve | Nominated | |
