= Marie Colomb =

French actress (born 1995)

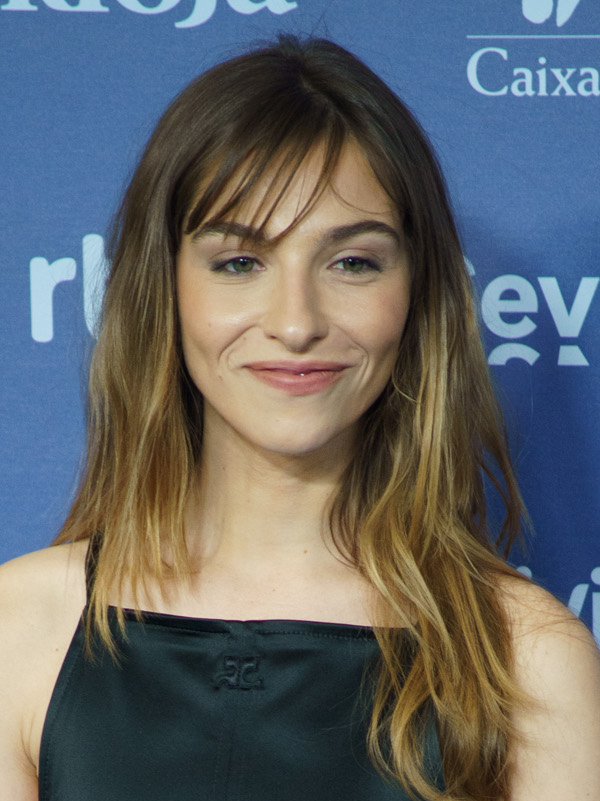
- Colomb in 2023
- Born: 1995 (age 30–31); Saint-Pardon-de-Conques, Gironde, France
- Occupation: Actress
- Years active: 2014–present

Marie Colomb (born 1995) is a French actress. She rose to prominence for starring in Rodrigo Sorogoyen's 2022 thriller film The Beasts, for which she received a nomination for the Goya Award for Best Supporting Actress. In 2025, she received the Trophée Chopard at the Cannes Film Festival and Madame Figaro Rising Star Award at Canneseries.

== Career ==
In 2017, Colomb made her feature acting debut starring in Un, deux, trois..., a comedy drama film directed by Mathieu Gari. In 2019, she starred in the titular role of France 2 limited series Laëtitia, based on the murder of Laëtitia Perrais. It was broadcast in the United States by HBO. She starred in thriller film Rascal, which had its world premiere at the 2020 Cannes Film Festival. In 2021, she starred as Marianne in Vincent Maël Cardona's Magnetic Beats, which premiered at the Directors' Fortnight of the Cannes Film Festival. She starred in Rodrigo Sorogoyen's thriller film The Beasts in 2022. For her performance in the film, she received a nomination for the Goya Award for Best Supporting Actress at the 37th ceremony.

In 2023, she starred in Frédéric Mermoud's drama film The Path of Excellence, which had its world premiere at the 76th Locarno Film Festival. In 2024, she portrayed reality television star Loana Petrucciani in anthology series Cult, which explores the creation of Loft Story. In April 2025, it was reported that Colomb would portray Éponine in Fred Cavayé's film adaptation of Les Misérables.

She served on the jury for the International Panorama section at the 2025 Series Mania. In April 2025, she received the Madame Figaro Rising Star Award at Canneseries. She also was honored with the Trophée Chopard at the 2025 Cannes Film Festival.

== Filmography ==
=== Film ===
| Year | Title | Role | Notes |
|---|---|---|---|
| 2017 | Un, deux, trois... | Julie | |
| 2017 | Merrick | Esther | |
| 2018 | Sunshine State of Mind | Suzanne | |
| 2020 | Rascal | Caroline | |
| 2021 | Magnetic Beats | Marianne | |
| 2022 | The Beasts | Marie | |
| 2023 | The Path of Excellence | Diane Le Goff | |
| 2026 | Les Misérables | Éponine | |

=== Television ===
| Year | Title | Role | Network | Notes |
|---|---|---|---|---|
| 2019 | Laëtitia | Laëtitia Perrais | France 2 | Main role |
| 2022 | UFOs | Véronique | Canal+ | Episode: "Episode 8" |
| 2023 | Follow | Léna | 13ème Rue | Main role |
| 2024 | Cult | Loana Petrucciani | Prime Video | Main role |
| 2025 | Change or Die | Eloïse Boissel | France 2 | Main role |
| 2026 | Eldorado | Emma Zenatti | Arte | Main role |
