= 49th César Awards =

Awards ceremony

- Official poster featuring a still frame from La Belle Fille et le Sorcier (1992)
- Date: 23 February 2024
- Site: Olympia, Paris
- Hosted by: Ariane Ascaride, Bérénice Bejo, Dali Benssalah, Juliette Binoche, Dany Boon, Bastien Bouillon, Audrey Diwan, Ana Girardot, Diane Kruger, Benoît Magimel, Paul Mirabel, Nadia Tereszkiewicz and Jean-Pascal Zadi

Highlights
- Best Film: Anatomy of a Fall
- Best Actor: Arieh Worthalter; The Goldman Case
- Best Actress: Sandra Hüller; Anatomy of a Fall
- Most awards: Anatomy of a Fall (6)
- Most nominations: The Animal Kingdom (12)

Television coverage
- Network: Canal+

The 49th César Awards ceremony, presented by the Académie des Arts et Techniques du Cinéma, took place on 23 February 2024 at the Olympia in Paris, to honour the best French films of 2023. Valérie Lemercier presided over the ceremony, after serving as the host for three previous editions (2006, 2007, and 2010).

Anatomy of a Fall went on to win six awards, more than any other film in the ceremony, including Best Film. For her work on the film, Justine Triet became the second woman in history to win Best Director. Agnès Jaoui and Christopher Nolan each received the Honorary César; Nolan's award was presented by Marion Cotillard, while Jaoui's was presented by Jamel Debbouze.

== Ceremony information ==
Before nominations were announced, the Académie shared in a communiqué that they would extend and expand their fledgling protocols, which were placed during the previous ceremony, that governed how the body handles people who are under judicial investigation for violent crimes. In the wake of a second wave of the #MeToo movement in French cinema, Judith Godrèche, who accused directors Benoît Jacquot and Jacques Doillon of sexual abuse, gave a speech on sexual violence and addressed the French film industry's omertà around #MeToo.

In designing the official poster for the 49th ceremony, the Académie chose to feature a still frame taken from Michel Ocelot's short film La Belle Fille et le Sorcier (1992), in an ode to animation and short films.

Valérie Lemercier presided over the ceremony, after serving as the host for three previous editions (2006, 2007, and 2010). Mirroring the previous ceremony, multiple actors and filmmakers hosted the 49th iteration: Ariane Ascaride, Bérénice Bejo, Dali Benssalah, Juliette Binoche, Dany Boon, Bastien Bouillon, Audrey Diwan, Ana Girardot, Diane Kruger, Benoît Magimel, Paul Mirabel, Nadia Tereszkiewicz and Jean-Pascal Zadi.

== Winners and nominees ==
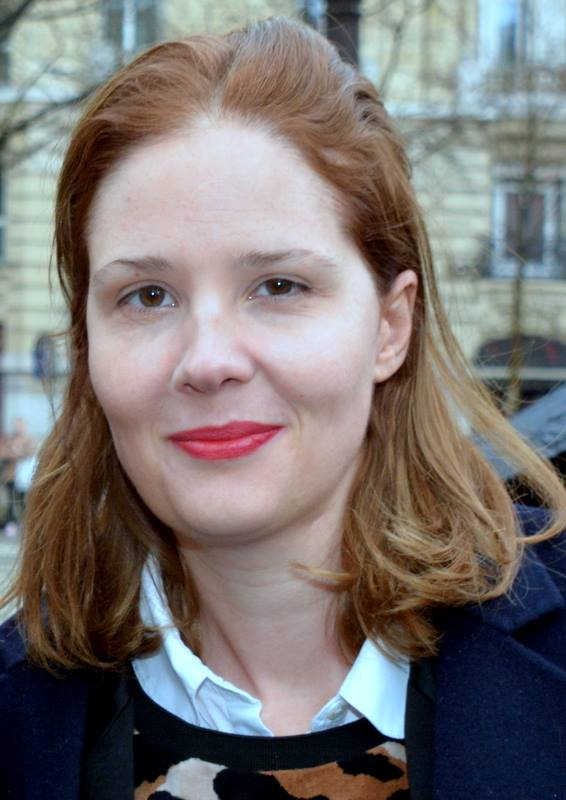
Justine Triet, Best Director winner and Best Original Screenplay co-winner

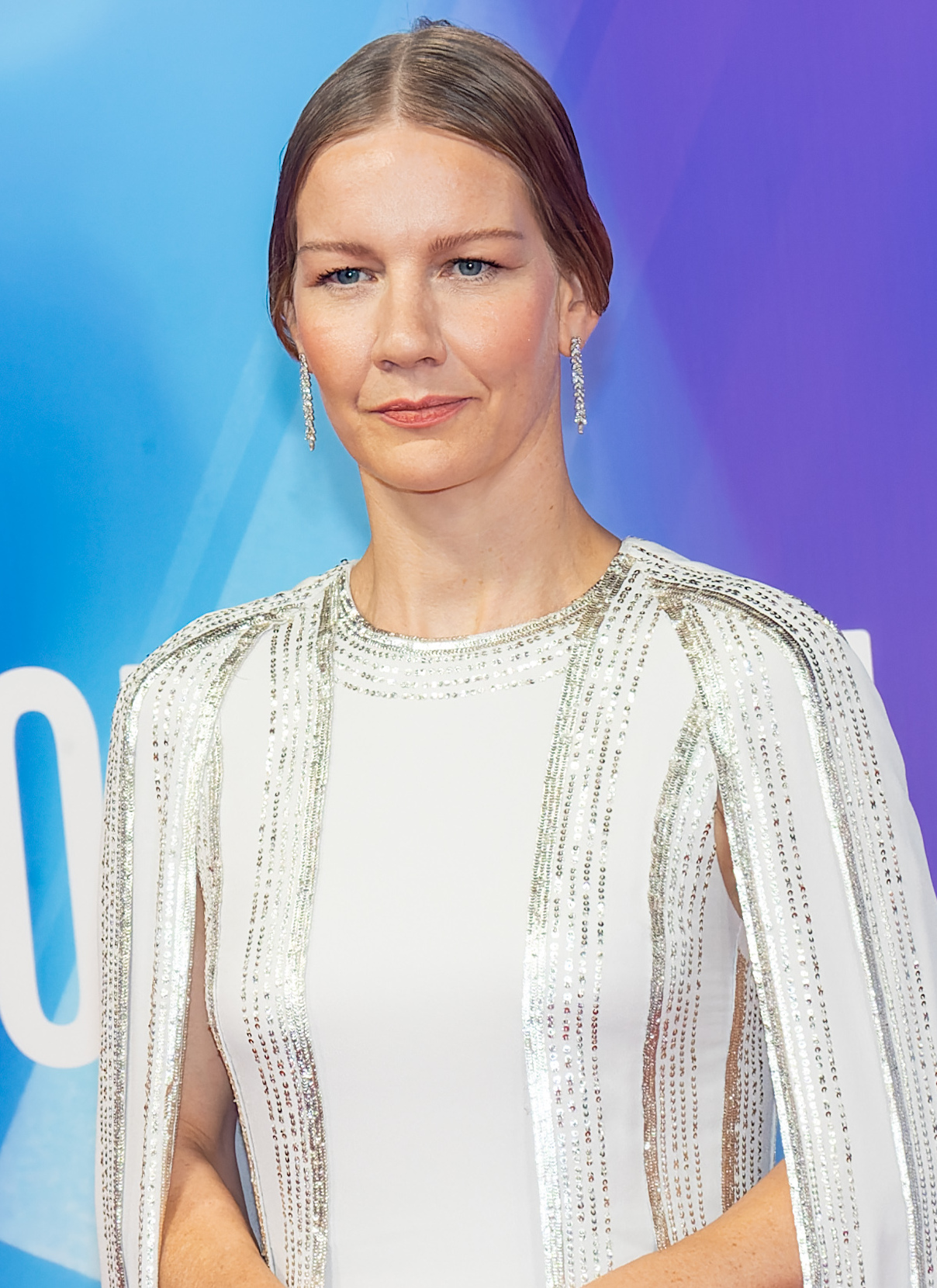
Sandra Hüller, Best Actress winner

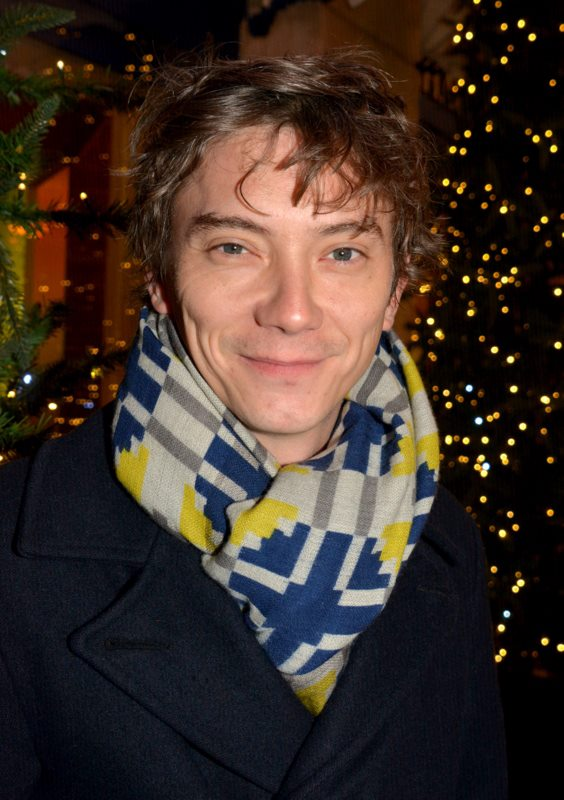
Swann Arlaud, Best Supporting Actor winner

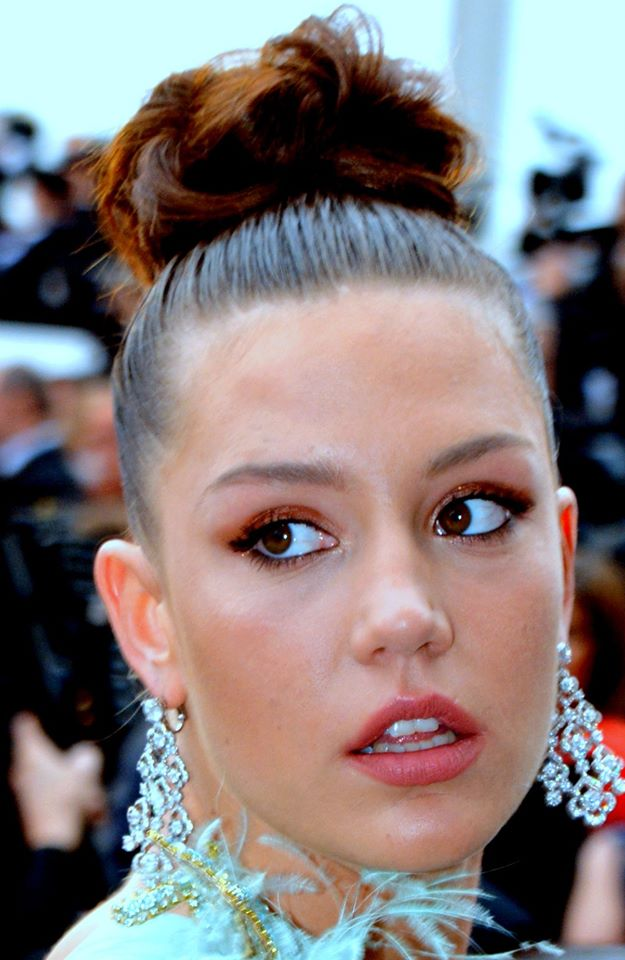
Adèle Exarchopoulos, Best Supporting Actress winner

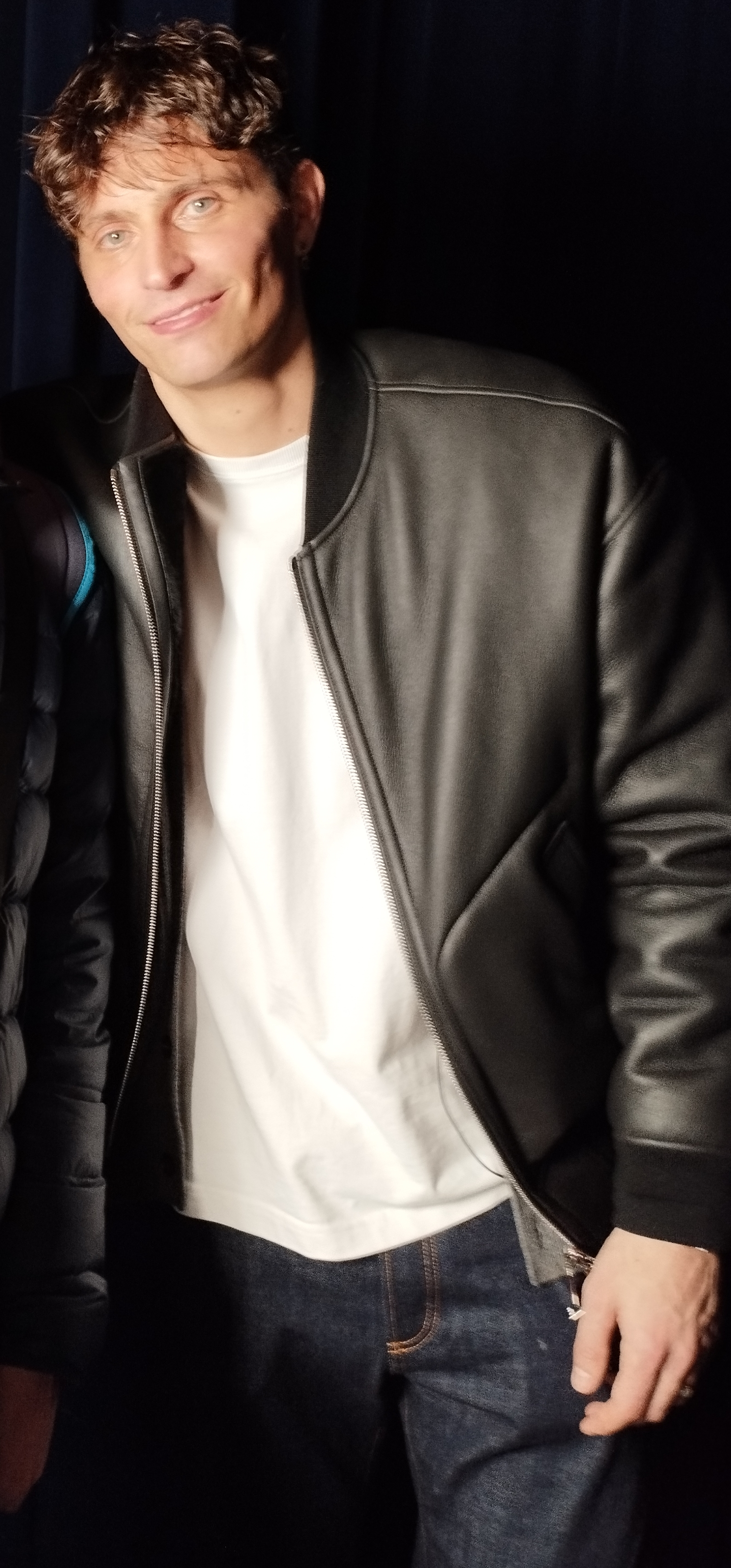
Raphaël Quenard, Best Male Revelation winner

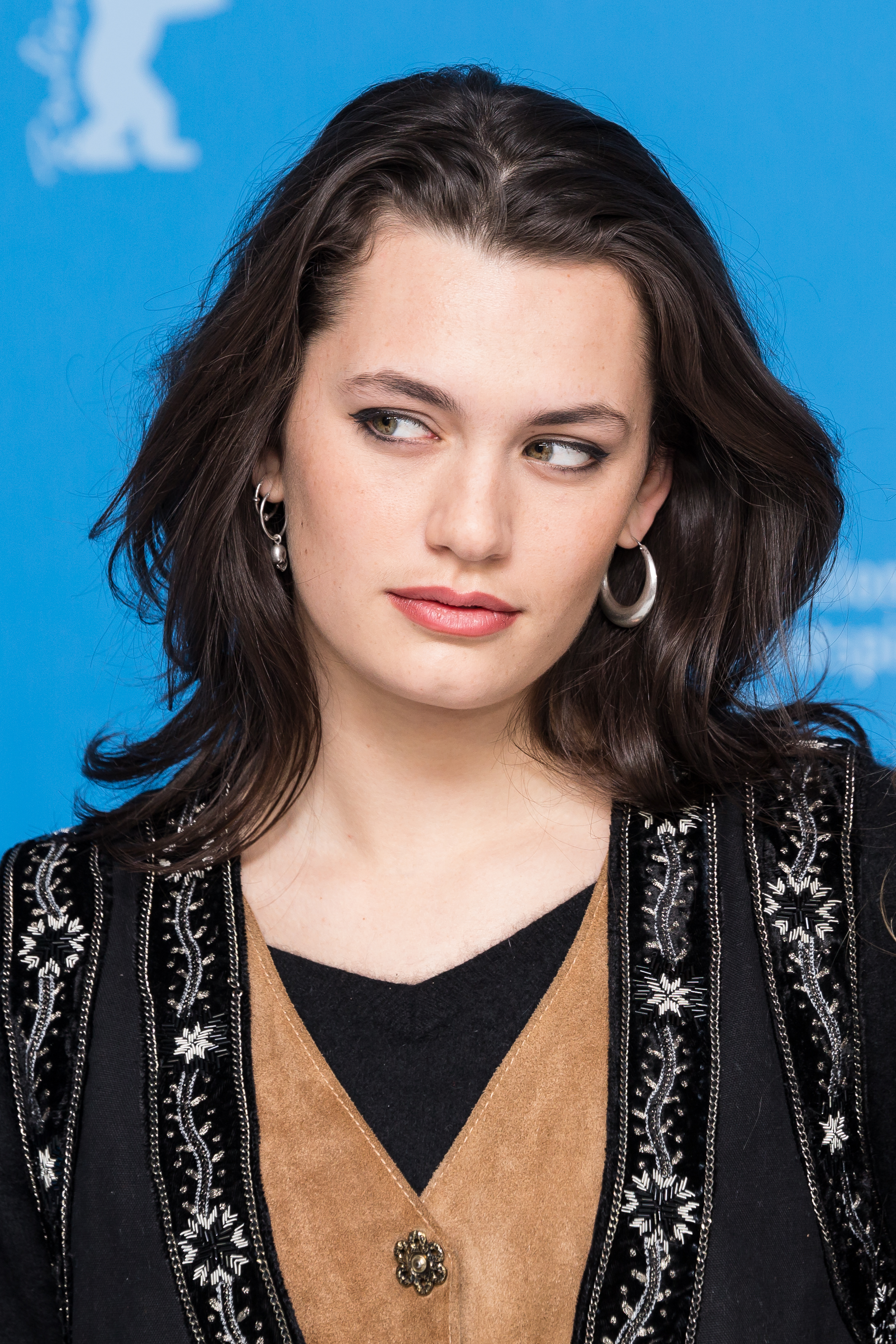
Ella Rumpf, Best Female Revelation winner

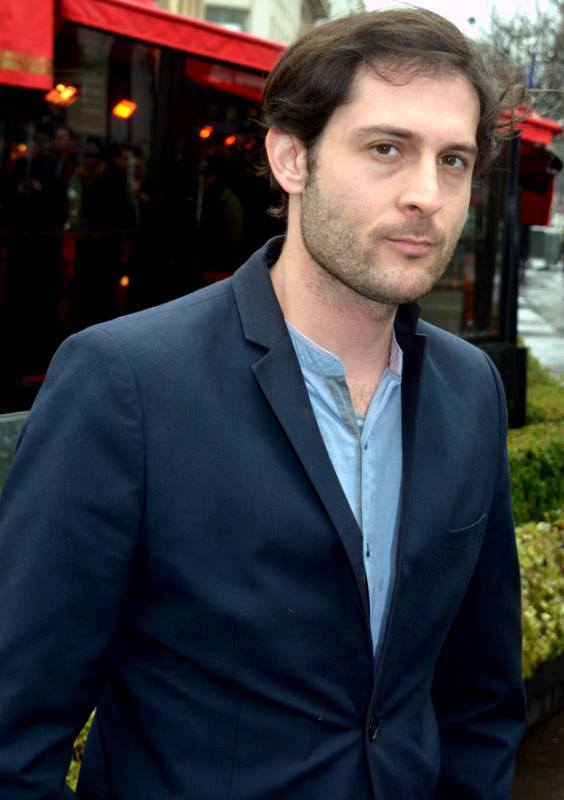
Arthur Harari, Best Original Screenplay co-winner

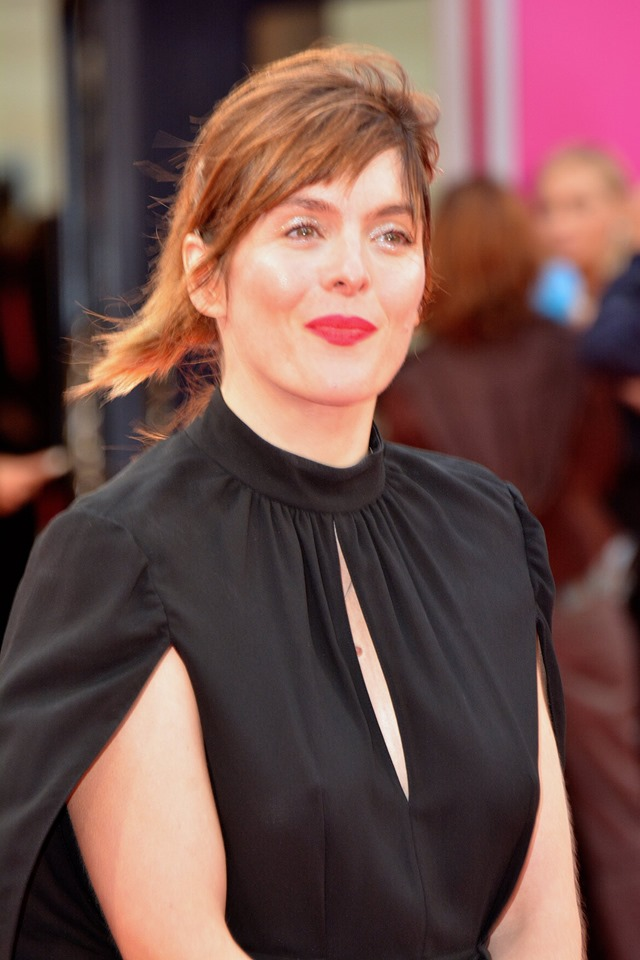
Valérie Donzelli, Best Adaptation co-winner

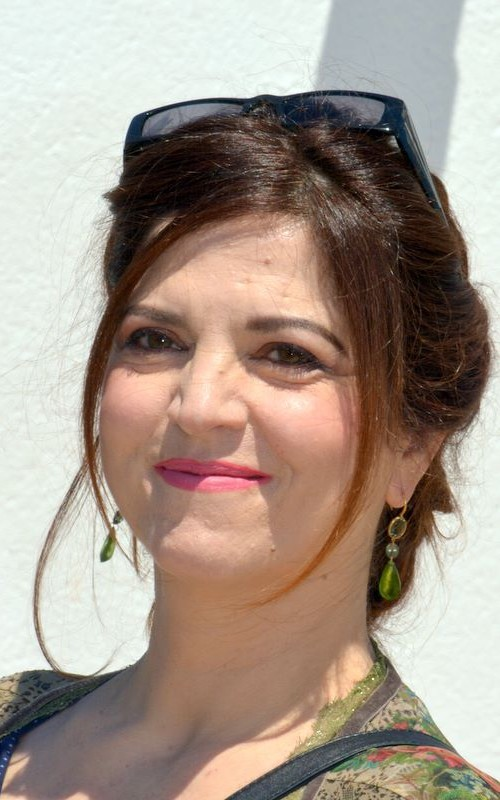
Agnès Jaoui, Honorary César recipient

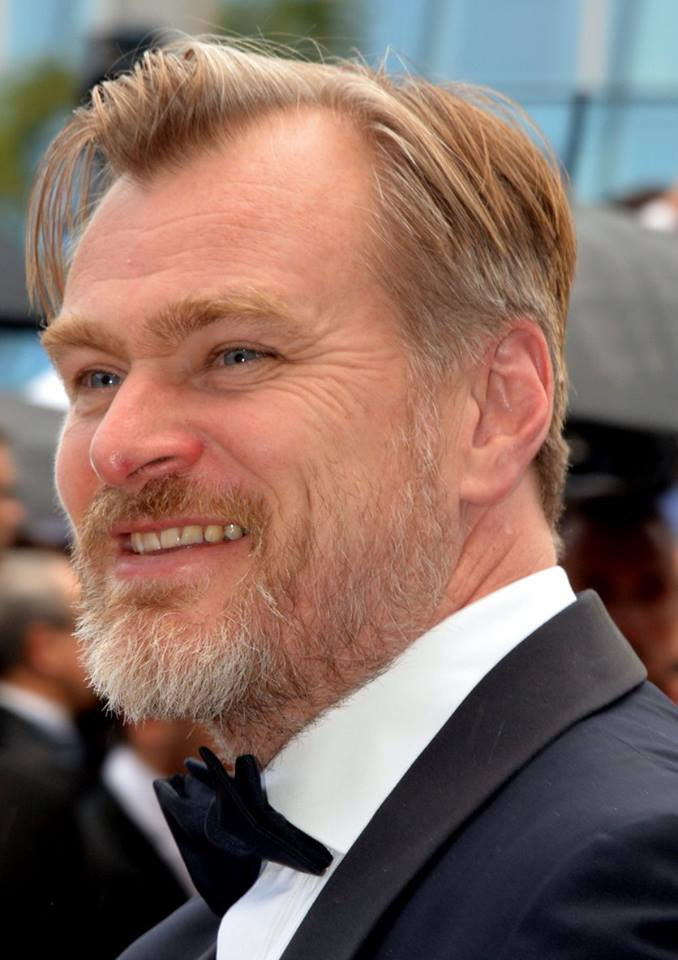
Christopher Nolan, Honorary César recipient

The nominations for the 49th César Awards were announced on 24 January 2024. The Animal Kingdom led with 12 nominations, followed by Anatomy of a Fall and All Your Faces with 11 and nine, respectively.

Anatomy of a Fall went on to win six awards, more than any other film in the ceremony, including Best Film. For her work on the film, Justine Triet became the second woman in history to win Best Director.

For her performance as Carole Achache in Little Girl Blue (2013), Marion Cotillard made history by becoming the first actress to be nominated for a César Award for Best Actress for a documentary film.

Agnès Jaoui and Christopher Nolan each received the Honorary César; Nolan's award was presented by Marion Cotillard, while Jaoui's was presented by Jamel Debbouze.

=== Awards ===
Winners are listed first, highlighted in boldface, and indicated with a double dagger (‡).

**Best Film**: **Anatomy of a Fall – produced by Marie-Ange Luciani and David Thion; directed by Justine Triet**; All Your Faces – produced by Hugo Sélignac and Alain Attal; directed by Jeanne Herry; The Animal Kingdom – produced by Pierre Guyard; directed by Thomas Cailley; The Goldman Case – produced by Benjamin Elalouf; directed by Cédric Kahn; Junkyard Dog – produced by Anaïs Bertrand; directed by Jean-Baptiste Durand	**Best Director**: **Justine Triet – Anatomy of a Fall**; Jeanne Herry – All Your Faces; Thomas Cailley – The Animal Kingdom; Cédric Kahn – The Goldman Case; Catherine Breillat – Last Summer
**Best Actor**: **Arieh Worthalter – The Goldman Case as Pierre Goldman**; Romain Duris – The Animal Kingdom as François; Benjamin Lavernhe – Abbé Pierre – A Century of Devotion as Abbé Pierre; Melvil Poupaud – Just the Two of Us as Grégoire; Raphaël Quenard – Yannick as Yannick	**Best Actress**: **Sandra Hüller – Anatomy of a Fall as Sandra Voyter**; Marion Cotillard – Little Girl Blue as Carole Achache; Léa Drucker – Last Summer as Anne; Virginie Efira – Just the Two of Us as Blanche; Hafsia Herzi – The Rapture as Lydia
**Best Supporting Actor**: **Swann Arlaud – Anatomy of a Fall as Vincent Renzi**; Anthony Bajon – Junkyard Dog as Dog; Arthur Harari – The Goldman Case as Georges Kiejman; Pio Marmaï – Yannick as Paul Rivière; Antoine Reinartz – Anatomy of a Fall as The Prosecutor	**Best Supporting Actress**: **Adèle Exarchopoulos – All Your Faces as Chloé Delarme**; Leïla Bekhti – All Your Faces as Nawelle; Galatea Bellugi – Junkyard Dog as Elsa; Élodie Bouchez – All Your Faces as Judith; Miou-Miou – All Your Faces as Sabine
**Best Male Revelation**: **Raphaël Quenard – Junkyard Dog as Mirales**; Julien Frison – Marguerite's Theorem as Lucas Savelli; Paul Kircher – The Animal Kingdom as Émile; Samuel Kircher – Last Summer as Théo; Milo Machado-Graner – Anatomy of a Fall as Daniel Maleski	**Best Female Revelation**: **Ella Rumpf – Marguerite's Theorem as Marguerite Hoffmann**; Céleste Brunnquell – No Love Lost as Rosa Gravier; Kim Higelin – Consent as Vanessa Springora; Suzanne Jouannet – The Path of Excellence as Sophie Vasseur; Rebecca Marder – Grand Expectations as Madeleine Pastor
**Best Original Screenplay**: **Anatomy of a Fall – Justine Triet and Arthur Harari**; All Your Faces – Jeanne Herry; The Animal Kingdom – Thomas Cailley and Pauline Munier; The Goldman Case – Cédric Kahn and Nathalie Hertzberg; Junkyard Dog – Jean-Baptiste Durand	**Best Adaptation**: **Just the Two of Us – Valérie Donzelli and Audrey Diwan; based on the novel L'Amour et les Forêts by Éric Reinhardt**; Consent – Vanessa Filho; based on the memoir by Vanessa Springora; Last Summer – Catherine Breillat; based on the film Queen of Hearts (2019), written by May el-Toukhy and Maren Louise Käehne
**Best First Film**: **Junkyard Dog – produced by Anaïs Bertrand; directed by Jean-Baptiste Durand**; Bernadette – produced by Fabrice Goldstein and Antoine Rein; directed by Léa Domenach; The Rapture – produced by Alice Bloch and Thierry de Clermont Tonnerre; directed by Iris Kaltenbäck; Infested – produced by Harry Tordjman; directed by Sébastien Vaniček; Vincent Must Die – produced by Claire Bonnefoy and Thierry Lounas; directed by Stéphan Castang	**Best Cinematography**: **The Animal Kingdom – David Cailley**; Anatomy of a Fall – Simon Beaufils; The Goldman Case – Patrick Ghiringhelli; The Taste of Things – Jonathan Ricquebourg; The Three Musketeers: D'Artagnan and The Three Musketeers: Milady – Nicolas Bolduc
**Best Editing**: **Anatomy of a Fall – Laurent Sénéchal**; All Your Faces – Francis Vesin; The Animal Kingdom – Lilian Corbeille; The Goldman Case – Yann Debet; Little Girl Blue – Valérie Loiseleux	**Best Sound**: **The Animal Kingdom – Fabrice Osinski, Raphaël Sohier, Matthieu Fichet, and Niels Barletta**; All Your Faces – Rémi Daru, Guadalupe Cassius, Loïc Prian, and Marc Doisne; Anatomy of a Fall – Julien Sicart, Fanny Martin, Jeanne Delplancq, and Olivier Goinard; The Goldman Case – Erwann Kerzanet, Sylvain Malbrant, and Olivier Guillaume; The Three Musketeers: D'Artagnan and The Three Musketeers: Milady – David Rit, Gwennolé Le Borgne, Olivier Touche, Cyril Holtz, and Niels Barletta
**Best Original Music**: **The Animal Kingdom – Andrea Laszlo De Simone**; Disco Boy – Vitalic; Junkyard Dog – Delphine Malausséna; Just the Two of Us – Gabriel Yared; The Three Musketeers: D'Artagnan and The Three Musketeers: Milady – Guillaume Roussel	**Best Costume Design**: **The Animal Kingdom – Ariane Daurat**; The Crime Is Mine – Pascaline Chavanne; Jeanne du Barry – Jürgen Doering; The Taste of Things – Tran Nu Yên Khé; The Three Musketeers: D'Artagnan and The Three Musketeers: Milady – Thierry Delettre
**Best Production Design**: **The Three Musketeers: D'Artagnan and The Three Musketeers: Milady – Stéphane Taillasson**; Anatomy of a Fall – Emmanuelle Duplay; The Animal Kingdom – Julia Lemaire; Jeanne du Barry – Angelo Zamparutti; The Taste of Things – Toma Baquéni	**Best Documentary Film**: **Four Daughters – produced by Nadim Cheikhrouha, Habib Attia, Thanassis Karathanos, and Martin Hampel; directed by Kaouther Ben Hania**; Atlantic Bar – produced by Chloé Servel and Nicolas Tiry; directed by Fanny Molins; Little Girl Blue – produced by Laetitia Gonzalez and Yaël Fogiel; directed by Mona Achache; Our Body – produced by Kristina Larsen; directed by Claire Simon; On the Adamant – produced by Céline Loiseau, Gilles Sacuto, and Miléna Poylo; directed by Nicolas Philibert
**Best Animated Feature Film**: **Chicken for Linda! – produced by Pierre Baussaron, Marc Irmer, and Emmanuel-Alain Raynal; directed by Chiara Malta and Sébastien Laudenbach**; Mars Express – produced by Didier Creste and Gaelle Bayssière; directed by Jérémie Périn; No Dogs or Italians Allowed – produced by Alexandre Cornu; directed by Alain Unghetto	**Best Animated Short Film**: **Été 96 – produced by Ninon Chapuis, Thibault De Gantès, Lucas Le Postec, and Simon Ingelaere; directed by Mathilde Bédouet**; Drôles d'oiseaux – produced by Virginie Giachino and Jean-Stéphane Michaux; directed by Charlie Belin; La forêt de mademoiselle Tang – produced by Thomas Giusiano, Paul Angelin N'Gbandjul, Sébastien Onomo, and Constance Perez; directed by Denis Do
**Best Fiction Short Film**: **Expecting – produced by Marie Boitard and Alice Douard; directed by Alice Douard**; Bolero – produced by Margaux Lorier; directed by Nans Laborde-Jourdàa; Fast – produced by Anne Luthaud; directed by Paul Rigoux; The Silent Ones – produced by Thomas Guentch; directed by Basile Vuillemin	**Best Documentary Short Film**: **La Mécanique des fluides – produced by Ninon Chapuis, Thibault de Gantès, and Lucas Le Postec; directed by Gala Hernández López**; L'Acteur, ou la surprenante vertu de l'incompréhension – produced by Anaïs Bertrand and Raphaël Quenard; directed by Hugo David and Raphaël Quenard; L'Effet de mis rides – produced by Yves Bouveret; directed by Claude Delafosse
**Best Foreign Film**: **The Nature of Love (Canada / France) – directed by Monia Chokri**; Fallen Leaves (Finland / Germany) – directed by Aki Kaurismäki; Kidnapped (Italy) – directed by Marco Bellocchio; Oppenheimer (United States / United Kingdom) – directed by Christopher Nolan; Perfect Days (Japan / Germany) – directed by Wim Wenders	**Best Visual Effects**: **The Animal Kingdom – Cyrille Bonjean, Bruno Sommier, and Jean-Louis Autret**; Acid – Thomas Duval; The Mountain – Lise Fischer and Cédric Fayolle; The Three Musketeers: D'Artagnan and The Three Musketeers: Milady – Olivier Cauwet; Infested – Léo Ewald
**Honorary César**: **Agnès Jaoui**; **Christopher Nolan**

=== Films with multiple nominations ===
The following films received multiple nominations:

Nominations	Films
12	The Animal Kingdom
11	Anatomy of a Fall
9	All Your Faces
8	The Goldman Case
7	Junkyard Dog
6	The Three Musketeers: D'Artagnan; The Three Musketeers: Milady
4	Just the Two of Us
4	Last Summer
3	Little Girl Blue
3	The Taste of Things
2	Consent
2	Jeanne du Barry
2	Marguerite's Theorem
2	The Rapture
2	Infested
2	Yannick

=== Films with multiple wins ===
The following films received multiple wins:

Wins	Films
6	Anatomy of a Fall
5	The Animal Kingdom
2	Junkyard Dog

=== Nominations by distributor ===
Nominations	Distributor	Ref.
21	StudioCanal	
14	Le Pacte	
9	Ad Vitam	
9	Diaphana	
8	Pyramide	
7	BAC Films	
7	Pathé	
5	Tandem	
4	Gaumont	
3	Gebeka	
2	Pan Distribution	

=== Wins by distributor ===
Wins	Distributor
6	Le Pacte
5	StudioCanal
2	BAC Films
2	Diaphana

== See also ==
- 96th Academy Awards
- 77th British Academy Film Awards
- 69th David di Donatello
- 36th European Film Awards
- 81st Golden Globe Awards
- 38th Goya Awards
- 29th Lumière Awards
- 13th Magritte Awards
