= Junkyard Dog (film) =

2023 film by Jean-Baptiste Durand

- Theatrical release poster
- French: Chien de la casse
- Directed by: Jean-Baptiste Durand
- Written by: Jean-Baptiste Durand; Nicolas Fleureau (collaboration); Emma Benestan (collaboration)
- Produced by: Anaïs Bertrand
- Starring: Anthony Bajon; Raphaël Quenard; Galatea Bellugi
- Cinematography: Benoît Jaoul
- Edited by: Perrine Bekaert
- Music by: Delphine Malausséna; Hugo Rossi
- Production company: Insolence Productions
- Distributed by: Bac Films
- Release dates: 27 January 2023 (Angers); 19 April 2023 (France)
- Running time: 93 minutes
- Country: France
- Language: French
- Box office: $555,548

Junkyard Dog (French: Chien de la casse) is a 2023 coming-of-age comedy-drama French film written and directed by Jean-Baptiste Durand in his feature-length directorial debut. The film stars Anthony Bajon, Raphaël Quenard and Galatea Bellugi. It tells the story of two idle young men, one shy and one assertive, living in rural France. Both struggle to grow and find their place in life, as their friendship is disrupted when the most timid of the two begins a relationship with a young woman.

The film screened at the Festival Premiers Plans d'Angers on 27 January 2023. It was released in France on 19 April 2023. It received seven nominations at the 49th César Awards, including Best Film and Best Original Screenplay, and won two awards: Most Promising Actor (for Quenard) and Best First Film.

== Plot ==
The story takes place over one summer in a village in rural southern France. Dog and Mirales, two childhood pals in their twenties, spend their days roaming the streets. The loudmouthed Mirales, both literate and uneducated, has completed training as a cook but makes a living selling weed, and hides his insecurities behind intellectual posturing. The taciturn Dog has just enlisted in the army and is awaiting his induction. To kill time, Mirales has got into the habit of teasing Dog mercilessly, which Dog meekly endures. A friend of theirs, Paco, plans to open a restaurant in the village and wants to hire Mirales as his chef, but Mirales acts as if the offer to work in a countryside restaurant is beneath him.

Elsa, a young woman who has just completed her literary studies, is hosted in the village by a friend as she takes time to figure out her future. She becomes acquainted with Mirales and Dog. Though Mirales was the one who initially approached her, it soon appears that she has little time for his swagger and has instead developed a liking for Dog. Elsa and Dog start a relationship. Mirales becomes jealous of their romance: he behaves obnoxiously with both of them, and his teasing of Dog turns into outright bullying. Dog finally tires of Mirales' attitude, breaks up with him and stops returning his calls.

Over a misunderstanding, Dog runs afoul of a group of local hoodlums. One night, he stumbles upon them and is chased by the gang in the streets of the village. He calls Mirales for help. Mirales comes to his rescue and helps him fight away his aggressors. Mirales' dog is fatally stabbed during the scuffle.

Dog and Mirales rekindle their friendship. They bury Mirales' dog. Dog leaves for the army. Mirales starts working at Paco's restaurant.

== Cast ==
- Anthony Bajon as Damien, aka "Dog"
- Raphaël Quenard as Mirales
- Galatea Bellugi as Elsa
- Dominique Reymond as Christiane, Mirales' mother
- Bernard Blancan as Bernard
- Nathan Le Graciet as Paco
- Kader Bouallaga as Ali
- Mike Reilles as Dimitri
- Mélanie Martinez as Charlotte
- Mathieu Amilien as Enzo
- Evelina Pitti as Madame Dufour
- Marysole Fertard as Sonia

== Production ==
Jean-Baptiste Durand wrote the film's screenplay, in collaboration with Nicolas Fleureau and Emma Benestan. Anaïs Bertrand produced the film for Insolence Productions.

Principal photography began on 9 November 2021 in France's Hérault department, and wrapped on 10 December 2021.

== Release ==
Junkyard Dog was selected to compete in the European First Feature section at the 35th Festival Premiers Plans d'Angers, where it had its world premiere on 27 January 2023. It was theatrically released on 19 April 2023 by Bac Films.

== Reception ==
=== Critical response ===
Junkyard Dog received an average rating of 3.7 out of 5 stars on the French website AlloCiné, based on 22 reviews.

=== Accolades ===
Award	Date of ceremony	Category	Recipient(s)	Result	Ref.
Angers European First Film Festival	29 January 2023	Grand Prix du jury	Junkyard Dog	Nominated	
Angers European First Film Festival	29 January 2023	Prix Jeanne Moreau (Prix du public)	Junkyard Dog	Won	
César Awards	23 February 2024	Best Film	Junkyard Dog	Nominated	
César Awards	23 February 2024	Best Supporting Actor	Anthony Bajon	Nominated	
César Awards	23 February 2024	Best Supporting Actress	Galatéa Bellugi	Nominated	
César Awards	23 February 2024	Most Promising Actor	Raphaël Quenard	Won	
César Awards	23 February 2024	Best Original Screenplay	Jean-Baptiste Durand	Nominated	
César Awards	23 February 2024	Best First Film	Junkyard Dog	Won	
César Awards	23 February 2024	Best Original Music	Delphine Malausséna	Nominated	
International Cinephile Society	11 February 2024	Best Debut Film	Junkyard Dog	Nominated	
International Cinephile Society	11 February 2024	Best Breakthrough Performance	Raphaël Quenard	Nominated	
Lumière Awards	22 January 2024	Best Male Revelation	Raphaël Quenard	Won	
Lumière Awards	22 January 2024	Best First Film	Junkyard Dog	Nominated	
Paris Film Critics Association Awards	4 February 2024	Best First Film	Jean-Baptiste Durand	Won	
Paris Film Critics Association Awards	4 February 2024	Best Male Revelation	Raphaël Quenard	Won	
Paris Film Critics Association Awards	4 February 2024	Best Supporting Actor	Raphaël Quenard	Nominated	
