= Mandibles (film) =

2020 comedy film

- Film poster
- French: Mandibules
- Directed by: Quentin Dupieux
- Written by: Quentin Dupieux
- Produced by: Hugo Sélignac; Vincent Mazel
- Starring: David Marsais; Grégoire Ludig; Adèle Exarchopoulos; India Hair; Roméo Elvis; Coralie Russier; Bruno Lochet; Dave Chapman
- Cinematography: Quentin Dupieux
- Edited by: Quentin Dupieux
- Music by: Metronomy
- Production companies: Chi-Fou-Mi Productions; Memento Films Production; C8 Films; Artemis Productions
- Distributed by: Memento Distribution (France)
- Release dates: September 5, 2020 (Venice); May 19, 2021 (France)
- Running time: 77 minutes
- Countries: France; Belgium
- Language: French
- Budget: $4.8 million
- Box office: $2 million

Mandibles (French: Mandibules) is a 2020 French-Belgian comedy film written and directed by Quentin Dupieux. It stars David Marsais, Grégoire Ludig, Adèle Exarchopoulos, India Hair, Roméo Elvis, Coralie Russier, Bruno Lochet, and Dave Chapman.

Mandibles had its world premiere at the 77th Venice International Film Festival on September 5, 2020. It was released in France on May 19, 2021 by Memento Films. Its release was delayed several times from an original December 2020 date due to the COVID-19 pandemic.

== Plot ==
Jean-Gab and Manu, two simple-minded friends, find a giant fly stuck in the trunk of a car and set themselves up to train it to earn them money.

== Cast ==
- David Marsais as Jean-Gab
- Grégoire Ludig as Manu
- Adèle Exarchopoulos as Agnès
- India Hair as Cécile
- Roméo Elvis as Serge
- Coralie Russier as Sandrine
- Bruno Lochet as Gilles
- Marius Colucci as an officer
- Thomas Blanchard as an officer
- Raphaël Quenard as Raimondo
- Gaspard Augé as a security guard
- Philippe Dusseau as Michel Michel
- Olivier Blanc as the butler
- Jean-Paul Solal as Maître Wolf
- Dave Chapman as The Fly

== Production ==
In September 2019, it was announced David Marsais, Grégoire Ludig, Adèle Exarchopoulos, India Hair, Roméo Elvis and Coralie Russier had joined the cast of the film, with Quentin Dupieux directing from a screenplay he wrote.

Exarchopoulos' character, Agnès, was inspired by Swedish environmental activist Greta Thunberg.

Principal photography began on 16 September 2019.

=== Music ===
The soundtrack was composed by the English band Metronomy. The main theme of the film was released by Because Music, the same day as the film was released in French theaters.

== Release ==
The film had its world premiere at the 77th Venice International Film Festival on September 5, 2020. It was also selected to screen at the Telluride Film Festival in September 2020, prior to its cancellation. It was released in France on May 19, 2021.

== Reception ==
=== Critical reception ===
On review aggregator Rotten Tomatoes, the film holds an approval rating of 92% based on 62 reviews, with an average rating of 7.4/10. The website's critics consensus reads, "Mandibles finds writer-director Quentin Dupieux off on another thoroughly original flight of fancy that will captivate like-minded audiences while baffling others."

== Future ==
During an interview in the French magazine CinemaTeaser on 24 May 2021, Dupieux hinted that he was ready to make a sequel if the film exceeded 500,000 admissions in France. The sequel would be called Tentacles. Mandibles ended up making only 235,824 admissions in France.
