= Smoking Causes Coughing =

2022 film by Quentin Dupieux

- Theatrical release poster
- French: Fumer fait tousser
- Directed by: Quentin Dupieux
- Written by: Quentin Dupieux
- Produced by: Hugo Sélignac
- Starring: Gilles Lellouche; Vincent Lacoste; Anaïs Demoustier; Jean-Pascal Zadi; Oulaya Amamra; David Marsais; Adèle Exarchopoulos; Grégoire Ludig; Doria Tillier; Jérôme Niel; Blanche Gardin; Alain Chabat; Benoît Poelvoorde
- Cinematography: Quentin Dupieux
- Edited by: Quentin Dupieux
- Production companies: Chi-Fou-Mi Productions; Gaumont
- Distributed by: Gaumont
- Release dates: 21 May 2022 (Cannes); 30 November 2022 (France)
- Running time: 80 minutes
- Country: France
- Language: French
- Box office: $1.1 million

Smoking Causes Coughing (French: Fumer fait tousser) is a 2022 French comedy film written, shot, edited and directed by Quentin Dupieux. It stars an ensemble cast, led by Gilles Lellouche, Vincent Lacoste, Anaïs Demoustier, Jean-Pascal Zadi and Oulaya Amamra, featuring David Marsais, Adèle Exarchopoulos, Grégoire Ludig, Doria Tillier, Jérôme Niel, Blanche Gardin, Alain Chabat and Benoît Poelvoorde. The film follows a team of five superheroes (Lellouche, Lacoste, Demoustier, Zadi and Amamra) who go on compulsory retreat in order to strengthen cohesion within their group until an enemy named Lézardin (Poelvoorde) interrupts the retreat to destroy the planet Earth.

Smoking Causes Coughing had its world premiere at the Cannes Film Festival on 21 May 2022 to the non-competitive Midnight Screening section. It was released in France on 30 November 2022 by Gaumont. The film received generally positive reviews from critics, who praised Dupieux's writing and direction, cast performances and humor. Several French critics cited Teenage Mutant Ninja Turtles, Choudenshi Bioman, Tales from the Crypt, Power Rangers and Les Nuls as inspirations for the film.

== Premise ==
After a devastating battle against a diabolical giant turtle, the Tobacco Force is sent on a mandatory week-long retreat to strengthen their decaying group cohesion. Their sojourn goes wonderfully well until Lézardin, Emperor of Evil, decides to annihilate planet Earth.

Within the movie, two vignettes are offered as 'scary stories': first, a tale about a "thinking helmet" which converts a woman at a weekend retreat into a nihilist, killing her husband and friends to alleviate them from the pain of life. Second, an aunt comes to the aid of her nephew as he is disintegrated by a woodchipper into a bucket of remains. The nephew keeps apologizing, even as nothing but a pair of lips floating in bloody entrails, constantly assuring her that he is not in pain.

At the end, the evil Lézardin is poisoned by his own family and dies before he can annihilate Earth. Unaware that they're now safe, the despondent Tobacco Force is joined at a campfire by Norbert 1200 (who replaced Norbert 500 after self-terminating) in an attempt to save their lives with time travel, only to endlessly recite "Please standby for Time Travel..." while doing nothing at all as the credits roll.

== Cast ==
- Gilles Lellouche as Benzène, a member of Tobacco Force
- Vincent Lacoste as Methanol, a member of Tobacco Force
- Anaïs Demoustier as Nicotine, a member of Tobacco Force
- Jean-Pascal Zadi as Mercure, a member of Tobacco Force
- Oulaya Amamra as Ammoniaque, a member of Tobacco Force
- David Marsais
- Adèle Exarchopoulos as Céline
- Grégoire Ludig as Christophe
- Doria Tillier as Agathe
- Jérôme Niel as Bruno
- Blanche Gardin as Tony
- Alain Chabat as the voice and puppeteer of Chief Didier, a rat who is the chief of Tobacco Force
- Benoît Poelvoorde as Lézardin, an Emperor of Evil
- Raphaël Quenard as Max
- Anthony Sonigo as Michaël
- Julia Faure
- Jules Dhios Francisco as Lézardou

== Production ==
In September 2021, filming took place in the Gard department near Uzès. Between 4 and 16 October 2021, filming took place at the Lac de Peiroou in Saint-Remy-de-Provence (Bouches-du-Rhône).

== Release ==
Smoking Causes Coughing premiered in the non-competitive Midnight section of the Cannes Film Festival on 21 May 2022. The film was released theatrically in France on 30 November 2022 by Gaumont. It was released in select theaters and on video on demand in the United States on 31 March 2023 by Magnolia Pictures.

== Reception ==
On the review aggregator website Rotten Tomatoes, 91% of 54 critics' reviews are positive, with an average rating of 6.9/10. The website's consensus reads: "Quentin Dupieux still isn't for everyone -- but if you're on his loopy wavelength, Smoking Causes Coughing causes laughter." Metacritic assigned a weighted average score of 74 out of 100, based on 13 critics, indicating "generally favorable reviews". The French cinema site AlloCiné gave the film a rating of 3.3/5 stars based on 34 reviews.

Valerie Complex of Deadline Hollywood wrote that "The director's stories know how to take extreme violence and turn it into sarcasm and comedy, often using inanimate objects to reflect humanity's shortcomings." Guy Lodge of Variety wrote that "In this amiably trollish throwaway, Dupieux invites his characters and audience alike to chill out and take things as they come, preferably with a smoke in hand." Martin Kudlac of Screen Anarchy wrote that Dupieux "approaches the rabbit hole of meta-fictional narration with a Lewis Carroll verve." Tim Grierson of Screen Daily wrote that "It's all fairly obvious, but also pretty consistently funny."
