= List of French films of 2025 =

This is a list of French films that were released in 2025, including co-productions with other countries.

== Most expensive films ==
The most expensive French films of 2025 are as follows:

Most expensive French films of 2025
Rank	Title	Distributor	Budget	Ref.
1	De Gaulle	Pathé	€75,500,000	
2	Chien 51	StudioCanal	€45,000,000	
3	Kaamelott: The Second Chapter	SND	€35,000,000	
4	13 Days, 13 Nights	Pathé	€30,000,000	
5	Parthenope	Pathé	€26,300,000	
6	The Shrinking Man	Universal Pictures	€21,000,000	
7	Les Tuche: God Save the Tuche	Pathé	€19,400,000	
8	Limonov: The Ballad	Pathé	€17,500,000	
9	The Legendaries	Pan-Européenne	€15,000,000	
10	Natacha (Almost) Air Hostess	Pathé	€14,990,000	
11	The Shrouds	Pyramide Films	€13,860,000	
12	All for One	UGC	€10,680,000	
13	Maldoror	The Jokers Films	€8,550,000	
14	Out of Control	SND	€7,160,000	
15	L'Amour, c'est surcôté	StudioCanal	€6,140,000	
16	The Ice Tower	Metropolitan Filmexport	€4,963,919	
17	The Quiet Son	Ad Vitam Distribution	€4,250,000	
18	Hear Me Love	Haut et Court	€4,745,000	
19	The Wonderers	Apollo Films	€3,300,000	
20	Le Quatrième Mur	Le Pacte	€3,200,000	

== January–March ==
⌀ Denotes a film that was publicly screened prior to 2024, be it through film festivals, premieres or releases in other countries
‡ Denotes a film primarily not in the French language

Opening		English Title	Native Title	Director	Cast	Studio	Ref.
J A N U A R Y	1	Bird ⌀‡	Bird	Andrea Arnold	Barry Keoghan, Franz Rogowski, Jasmine Jobson, James Nelson-Joyce	Ad Vitam Distribution	
J A N U A R Y	1	How to Make a Killing	Un ours dans le Jura	Franck Dubosc	Franck Dubosc, Laure Calamy, Benoît Poelvoorde, Joséphine de Meaux, Emmanuelle Devos, Kim Higelin, Younès Boucif	Gaumont	
J A N U A R Y	1	L'Amour, c'est surcôté	L'Amour, c'est surcôté	Mourad Winter	Hakim Jemili, Laura Felpin, Benjamin Tranié, Alassane Diong, Steve Tientcheu, François Damiens, Saïda Jawad, Abbes Zahmani, Clotilde Courau	StudioCanal	
J A N U A R Y	8	Parthenope ⌀‡	Parthenope	Paolo Sorrentino	Celeste Dalla Porta, Stefania Sandrelli, Gary Oldman, Silvio Orlando, Luisa Ranieri, Peppe Lanzetta, Isabella Ferrari	Pathé	
J A N U A R Y	8	Toutes pour Une	Toutes pour une	Houda Benyamina	Oulaya Amamra, Daphné Patakia, Déborah Lukumuena, Sabrina Ouazani, Georgina Amorós	UGC	
J A N U A R Y	8	Treasure ⌀‡	Treasure	Julia von Heinz	Lena Dunham, Stephen Fry, Zbigniew Zamachowski	Haut et Court	
J A N U A R Y	10	Ad Vitam	Ad Vitam	Rodolphe Lauga	Guillaume Canet, Alexis Manenti, Nassim Lyes, Zita Hanrot, Johan Heldenbergh	Netflix	
J A N U A R Y	15	Filmlovers! ⌀	Spectateurs!	Arnaud Desplechin	Dominique Païni, Clément Hervieu-Léger, Françoise Lebrun, Sandra Laugier, Milo Machado-Graner, Micha Lescot, Mathieu Amalric	Les Films du Losange	
J A N U A R Y	15	I'm Still Here ⌀‡	Ainda Estou Aqui	Walter Salles	Fernanda Torres, Fernanda Montenegro, Selton Mello, Marjorie Estiano, Humberto Carrão, Valentina Herszage, Dan Stulbach, Maeve Jinkings	StudioCanal	
J A N U A R Y	15	Le Quatrième Mur	Le Quatrième Mur	David Oelhoffen	Laurent Lafitte, Manal Issa, Simon Abkarian	Le Pacte	
J A N U A R Y	15	Maldoror	Maldoror	Fabrice Du Welz	Anthony Bajon, Alba Gaïa Bellugi, Alexis Manenti, Sergi López, Laurent Lucas, David Murgia, Béatrice Dalle, Lubna Azabal, Jackie Berroyer, Mélanie Doutey, Félix Maritaud	The Jokers Films	
J A N U A R Y	22	The Quiet Son	Jouer avec le feu	Delphine and Muriel Coulin	Vincent Lindon, Benjamin Voisin, Stefan Crepon, Sophie Guillemin	Ad Vitam Distribution	
J A N U A R Y	22	The Shrouds ⌀‡	The Shrouds	David Cronenberg	Vincent Cassel, Diane Kruger, Guy Pearce, Sandrine Holt	Pyramide Films	
J A N U A R Y	22	We Live in Time ⌀‡	We Live in Time	John Crowley	Andrew Garfield, Florence Pugh, Adam James, Marama Corlett, Aoife Hinds, Heather Craney, Kara Lynch	StudioCanal	
J A N U A R Y	29	A Boat in the Garden ⌀	Slocum et moi	Jean-François Laguionie	Elias Hauter, Grégory Gadebois, Coraly Zahonero, André Marcon	Gebeka Films	
F E B R U A R Y	5	Block Pass ⌀	La Pampa	Antoine Chevrollier	Sayyid El Alami, Amaury Foucher, Artus, Damien Bonnard, Mathieu Demy	Tandem Films	
F E B R U A R Y	5	Les Tuche: God Save the Tuche	Les Tuche: God Save the Tuche	Jean-Paul Rouve	Jean-Paul Rouve, Isabelle Nanty, Claire Nadeau, Sarah Stern, Pierre Lottin, Théo Fernandez, Bernard Ménez, Élise Larnicol, Lou Ruat	Pathé	
F E B R U A R Y	5	Paddington in Peru ⌀‡	Paddington in Peru	Dougal Wilson	Ben Whishaw, Hugh Bonneville, Emily Mortimer, Julie Walters, Jim Broadbent, Madeleine Harris, Samuel Joslin, Carla Tous, Olivia Colman, Antonio Banderas, Imelda Staunton	StudioCanal	
F E B R U A R Y	5	Rapide	Rapide	Morgan S. Dalibert	Alban Lenoir, Paola Locatelli, Anne Marivin, Tchéky Karyo	Universal Pictures	
F E B R U A R Y	12	Hear Me Love	Joli joli	Diastème	Clara Luciani, William Lebghil, Laura Felpin, José Garcia, Grégoire Ludig, Vincent Dedienne, Jeanne Rosa, Victor Belmondo, Carolina Jurczak, Anne Serra, Thomas VDB, Alexis Moncorgé, Jean-Jacques Vanier, Alban Lenoir, Grégori Baquet, Frédéric Andrau	Haut et Court	
F E B R U A R Y	12	Mikado	Mikado	Baya Kasmi	Félix Moati, Vimala Pons, Ramzy Bedia	Memento Distribution	
F E B R U A R Y	19	The Ties That Bind Us⌀	L'Attachement	Carine Tardieu	Valeria Bruni Tedeschi, Pio Marmaï, Vimala Pons	Diaphana Distribution	
F E B R U A R Y	19	Je le jure	Je le jure	Samuel Theis	Louise Bourgoin, Marina Foïs, Micha Lescot, Sophie Guillemin, Saadia Bentaïeb, Serge Bozon, Emmanuel Salinger, Claire Burger, Claude Aufaure	Ad Vitam Distribution	
F E B R U A R Y	19	Limonov: The Ballad ⌀‡	Limonov: The Ballad	Kirill Serebrennikov	Ben Whishaw, Viktoria Miroshnichenko, Tomas Arana, Corrado Invernizzi, Evgeniy Mironov, Andrey Burkovskiy, Maria Mashkova, Odin Lund Biron, Sandrine Bonnaire, Céline Sallette, Louis-Do de Lencquesaing, Donald Sumpter	Pathé	
F E B R U A R Y	19	Out of Control	Histoire d'un mariage	Anne Le Ny	Omar Sy, Élodie Bouchez, Vanessa Paradis, José Garcia	SND	
M A R C H	19	Once Upon My Mother	Ma mère, Dieu et Sylvie Vartan	Ken Scott	Jonathan Cohen, Leïla Bekhti, Sylvie Vartan	Egérie Productions, Gaumont, Christal Films	
M A R C H	26	Baby ⌀‡	Baby	Marcelo Caetano	João Pedro Mariano, Ricardo Teodoro, Ana Flavia Cavalcanti	Epicentre Films	
M A R C H	26	The Mohican	Le Mohican	Frédéric Farrucci	Alexis Manenti, Mara Taquin	Ad Vitam Distribution	

== April–June ==
Opening		English Title	Native Title	Director	Cast	Studio	Ref.
A P R I L	2	Natacha (Almost) Air Hostess	Natacha (Presque) Hôtesse de l'Air	Noémie Saglio	Camille Lou, Vincent Dedienne, Didier Bourdon, Elsa Zylberstein, Isabelle Adjani, Anne Charrier, Baptiste Lecaplain, Fabrice Luchini	Pathé	
A P R I L	16	Doux Jésus	Doux Jésus	Frédéric Quiring	Marilou Berry, Isabelle Nanty, Anne Benoît, Valérie Mairesse, François Berléand	UGC	
M A Y	21	The Wailing ⌀‡	Les Maudites	Pedro Martín-Calero	Ester Expósito, Mathilde Ollivier, Malena Villa	Paname Distribution	
M A Y	28	Else ⌀	Else	Thibault Emin	Matthieu Sampeur, Édith Proust, Lika Minamoto	UFO Distribution	
J U N E	4	Guess Who's Calling!	Le Répondeur	Fabienne Godet	Salif Cissé, Denis Podalydès, Aure Atika	Tandem	
J U N E	27	13 Days, 13 Nights	13 jours, 13 nuits	Martin Bourboulon	Roschdy Zem, Lyna Khoudri, Sidse Babett Knudsen, Christophe Montenez, Fatima Adoum	Pathé	

== July–September ==
Opening		English Title	Native Title	Director	Cast	Studio	Ref.
J U L Y	2	The Piano Accident	L'Accident de piano	Quentin Dupieux	Adèle Exarchopoulos, Jérôme Commandeur, Sandrine Kiberlain	Diaphana Distribution	
J U L Y	9	The Legendaries	Les Légendaires	Guillaume Ivernel	TBA	Pan-Européenne	
J U L Y	30	Dracula ‡	Dracula	Luc Besson	Caleb Landry Jones, Christoph Waltz, Matilda De Angelis, Zoë Bleu	SND	
A U G U S T	20	Alpha	Alpha	Julia Ducournau	Mélissa Boros, Tahar Rahim, Golshifteh Farahani	Diaphana Distribution	
S E P T E M B E R	3	Sleepless City ‡	La Ville sans sommeil	Guillermo Galoe	Antonio Fernández Gabarre	Pan Distribution	
S E P T E M B E R	10	Sirāt ‡	Sirāt	Oliver Laxe	Sergi López, Bruno Núñez	Pyramide Films	
S E P T E M B E R	17	The Ice Tower	La Tour de glace	Lucile Hadžihalilović	Marion Cotillard, Clara Pacini, August Diehl, Gaspar Noé	Metropolitan Filmexport	
S E P T E M B E R	17	Nino	Nino	Pauline Loquès	Théodore Pellerin, William Lebghil, Salomé Dewaels	Jour2fête	

== October–December ==
‡ Denotes a film primarily not in the French language

Opening		English Title	Native Title	Director	Cast	Studio	Ref.
O C T O B E R	15	Dog 51	Chien 51	Cédric Jimenez	Adèle Exarchopoulos, Gilles Lellouche, Louis Garrel	StudioCanal	
O C T O B E R	15	Two Pianos	Deux pianos	Arnaud Desplechin	François Civil, Nadia Tereszkiewicz, Charlotte Rampling, Hippolyte Girardot	Le Pacte	
O C T O B E R	15	Le Jour G	Le Jour G	Claude Zidi Jr.	Kev Adams, Brahim Bouhlel, Didier Bourdon, Chantal Ladesou, Marie Parisot, Jonathan Lambert, Cristiana Reali, Jarry, Guy Lecluyse	Apollo Films	
O C T O B E R	22	The Shrinking Man	L'Homme qui rétrécit	Jan Kounen	Jean Dujardin, Marie-Josée Croze, Daphné Richard	Universal Pictures	
O C T O B E R	29	The Richest Woman in the World	La Femme la plus riche du monde	Thierry Klifa	Isabelle Huppert, Laurent Lafitte, Marina Foïs, Raphaël Personnaz		
O C T O B E R	29	The Stranger	L'Étranger	François Ozon	Benjamin Voisin, Rebecca Marder, Pierre Lottin	Gaumont Distribution	
N O V E M B E R	12	The Incredible Snow Woman	L'Incroyable Femme des neiges	Sébastien Betbeder	Blanche Gardin, Philippe Katerine, Bastien Bouillon	KMBO	
N O V E M B E R	12	Unsubmissives	Le Gang des Amazones	Mélissa Drigeard	Izïa Higelin, Lyna Khoudri, Laura Felpin, Mallory Wanecque	Apollo Films	
N O V E M B E R	12	Eagles of the Republic ‡	Les Aigles de la République	Tarik Saleh	Fares Fares, Zineb Triki, Lyna Khoudri	Memento	
N O V E M B E R	12	Les Rêveurs	Les Rêveurs	Isabelle Carré	Isabelle Carré, Judith Chemla, Tessa Dumont Janod	Pan Distribution	
N O V E M B E R	19	Case 137	Dossier 137	Dominik Moll	Léa Drucker, Guslagie Malanda, Dorothée Martinet	Haut et Court	
N O V E M B E R	26	A Private Life	Vie privée	Rebecca Zlotowski	Jodie Foster, Daniel Auteuil, Virginie Efira	Ad Vitam	
D E C E M B E R	3	Out of Love	Les enfants vont bien	Nathan Ambrosioni	Camille Cottin, Juliette Armanet and Monia Chokri	Chi-Fou-Mi Productions	
D E C E M B E R	10	La Condition	La Condition	Jérôme Bonnell	Swann Arlaud, Galatea Bellugi, Louise Chevillotte	Diaphana Distribution	
D E C E M B E R	31	The Wonderers	Qui brille au combat	Joséphine Japy	Mélanie Laurent, Pierre-Yves Cardinal, Angelina Woreth, Sarah Pachou	Apollo Films	
D E C E M B E R	31	Los Tigres ‡	Los Tigres	Alberto Rodríguez	Antonio de la Torre, Bárbara Lennie, Joaquín Núñez	Le Pacte	

== TBA ==
† Denotes a film released through a streaming service, not theatrically
‡ Denotes a film primarily not in the French language

Native Title	English Title	Director	Cast	Studio	Ref.
French Lover †	French Lover	Nina Rives	Omar Sy, Sara Giraudeau, Pascale Arbillot, Alban Ivanov	Netflix	
Kaamelott: The Second Chapter	Kaamelott: Deuxième Volet	Alexandre Astier	Alexandre Astier, Franck Pitiot, Jean-Christophe Hembert, Thomas Cousseau, Anne Girouard, Simon Astier, Christian Clavier	SND	
Le Jardinier †	Le Jardinier	David Charhon	Jean-Claude Van Damme, Michaël Youn, Nawell Madani, Kaaris, Matthias Quiviger, Jérôme Le Banner	Amazon Prime Video	
That Summer in Paris	Le rendez-vous de l'été	Valentine Cadic	Blandine Madec, India Hair	Comme des Cinémas	

== See also ==
- 51st César Awards
