= Audrey Diwan =

French film director of Lebanese origin

- Born: 1980 (age 45–46); Paris, France
- Occupations: journalist; editor; film director; screenwriter
- Years active: 2008–present .
- Partner: Cédric Jimenez (–2018)
- Children: 2

Audrey Diwan (French pronunciation: [odʁe diwan]; born 1980) is a French filmmaker, journalist and screenwriter.

She is most known for her 2021 film Happening, which won the Golden Lion at the 78th Venice International Film Festival.

== Career ==
=== Early life ===
Before filmmaking, Diwan was a junior editor at Denoël as well as publishing various novels.

She has written many books, which led her to become a screenwriter including How to Be Parisian Wherever You Are: Love, Style, and Bad Habits, Confessions d'un salaud, De l'autre côté de l'été, La fabrication d'un mensonge, Cléo de 5 à 7.

She has also held senior positions in editorial offices for various fashion and culture magazines such as Glamour and Stylist.

=== Filmmaking career ===
Diwan transitioned to filmmaking co-writing with Arnaud Duprey the thriller film Paris Under Watch (2012). She also collaboratted with her former husband Cédric Jimenez in three films: The Connection (2014), The Man with the Iron Heart (2017) and BAC Nord (2020).

Her directorial debut feature film Losing It (Mais vous êtes fous) premiered in 2019.

In 2021, Diwan directed Happening (L'Événement) based on Annie Ernaux's 2000 memoir of same name. The film had its world premiere at the main competition of the 78th Venice International Film Festival, where it won the Golden Lion in a "unanimous decision", thus making her the sixth female director to ever win this award. It was theatrically released in France shortly after, where it was met with critical acclaim, winning the Lumière Award for Best Film, alongside nominations for the César Award for Best Film, Best Director and Best Adaptation.

Diwan also collaborated with Valérie Donzelli in Just the Two of Us, and with Teddy Lussi-Modeste in The Good Teacher.

In 2024, Diwan released her English language debut feature Emmanuelle, a feminist reboot of the popular softcore erotic series of the same name. The film was met with negative reviews.

Also in 2024, Diwan co-wrote the French box-office hit Beating Hearts alongside Gilles Lellouche and Ahmed Hamidi.

== Personal life ==
Diwan is of Lebanese and Romanian descent.

Diwan was in a relationship with French director Cédric Jimenez, with whom she had two children, born in 2007 and 2008, respectively. Diwan and Jimenez separated in 2018.

On 29 September 2023, Diwan announced her engagement to film producer Thibault Gast, with whom she has been in a relationship since 2021.

She is a member of Collectif 50/50, a French NGO promoting equality between men and women in the film industry.

== Filmography ==
=== Feature films ===
Year	English Title	Original Title	Notes
2019	Losing It	Mais vous êtes fous	
2021	Happening	L'Événement	
2024	Emmanuelle		Also producer

=== Only writer ===
Year	English Title	Original Title	Notes
2008	De feu et de glace		TV movie
2012	Paris Under Watch	Aux yeux de tous	Co-written with Arnaud Duprey
2014	The Connection	La French	Co-written with Cédric Jimenez
2017	The Man with the Iron Heart	HHhH	Co-written with Cédric Jimenez and David Farr
2018	(Girl)Friend		
2020	BAC Nord		Co-written with Cédric Jimenez
2023	Just the Two of Us	L'Amour et les Forêts	Co-written with Valérie Donzelli
2023	Visions		Collaboration with Michel Fessler, Aurélie Valat, Jean-Baptiste Delafon and Yann Gozlan
2024	The Good Teacher	Pas de Vagues	Co-written with Teddy Lussi-Modeste
2024	Beating Hearts	L'Amour ouf	Co-written with Gilles Lellouche and Ahmed Hamidi

== Awards and nominations ==
Throughout the course of her career, Audrey Diwan has been nominated for 25 films, 13 of which she has won. This includes winning all three awards she had been nominated for at the International Online Cinema Awards, winning Best Director as well as Best Adapted Screenplay two years in a row.

Year	Award	Category	Work	Result	Ref.
2022	British Academy Film Awards	Best Director	Happening	Nominated	
2022	César Awards	Best Film	Happening	Nominated	
2022	César Awards	Best Director	Happening	Nominated	
2022	César Awards	Best Adaptation	Happening	Nominated	
2021	European Film Awards	European University Film Award	Happening	Nominated	
2022	Gotham Awards	Best International Feature	Happening	Won	
2015	Lumière Awards	Best Screenplay	The Connection	Nominated	
2022	Lumière Awards	Best Film	Happening	Won	
2022	Lumière Awards	Best Director	Happening	Nominated	
2021	Venice Film Festival	Golden Lion	Happening	Won	
2021	Venice Film Festival	FIPRESCI Prize	Happening	Won	
2021	Venice Film Festival	Brian Award	Happening	Won	
2021	Venice Film Festival	Arca CinemaGiovani Award: Venezia 78 Best Film	Happening	Won	
