= Beating Hearts =

2024 film by Gilles Lellouche

- Theatrical release poster
- French: L'Amour ouf
- Directed by: Gilles Lellouche
- Screenplay by: Gilles Lellouche; Ahmed Hamidi; Audrey Diwan
- Dialogue by: Gilles Lellouche
- Based on: Jackie Loves Johnser OK? by Neville Thompson
- Produced by: Alain Attal; Hugo Sélignac
- Starring: Adèle Exarchopoulos; François Civil; Mallory Wanecque; Malik Frikah; Alain Chabat; Benoît Poelvoorde; Vincent Lacoste; Jean-Pascal Zadi; Élodie Bouchez; Karim Leklou; Raphaël Quenard; Anthony Bajon
- Cinematography: Laurent Tangy
- Edited by: Simon Jacquet
- Music by: Jon Brion
- Production companies: Chi-Fou-Mi Productions; Trésor Films; StudioCanal
- Distributed by: StudioCanal (France); Cinéart (Belgium)
- Release dates: 23 May 2024 (Cannes); 16 October 2024 (France and Belgium)
- Running time: 166 minutes (Cannes version); 161 minutes (theatrical version)
- Countries: France; Belgium
- Language: French
- Budget: €35.7 million
- Box office: $36 million

Beating Hearts (French: L'Amour ouf) is a 2024 romantic drama film directed by Gilles Lellouche from a screenplay he co-wrote with Ahmed Hamidi and Audrey Diwan, based on the 1997 novel Jackie Loves Johnser OK? by Irish author Neville Thompson. The film is a co-production between France and Belgium. It stars Adèle Exarchopoulos and François Civil. The ensemble cast includes Mallory Wanecque, Malik Frikah, Alain Chabat, Benoît Poelvoorde, Vincent Lacoste, Jean-Pascal Zadi, Élodie Bouchez, Karim Leklou, Raphaël Quenard and Anthony Bajon.

The film had its world premiere in main competition at the 77th Cannes Film Festival on 23 May 2024, where it received mostly negative reviews from critics. It was released theatrically on 16 October 2024 in France by StudioCanal and in Belgium by Cinéart. The film received 13 nominations at the 50th César Awards, including Best Director, Best Actress for Exarchopoulos and Best Actor for Civil, with Chabat winning Best Supporting Actor.

== Premise ==
The story spans 20 years and begins in the North East of France with two teenagers who fall madly in love, a girl from an upper-middle-class family and a boy from a working-class family. Their love story is quickly doomed to failure when he ends up becoming a criminal and spends 12 years in prison.

== Cast ==
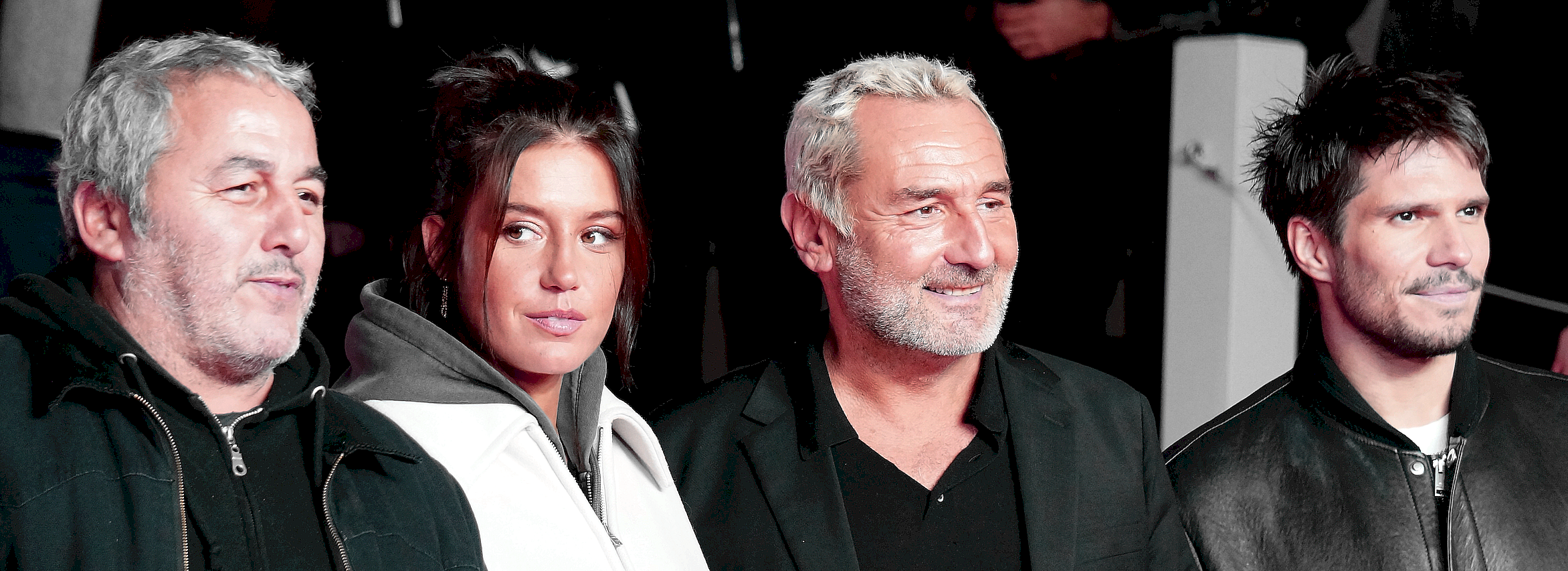
Ahmed Hamidi, Adèle Exarchopoulos, Gilles Lellouche and François Civil at the 2024 Film Fest Gent

- Adèle Exarchopoulos as Jackie
  - Mallory Wanecque as Jackie (15 years old)
- François Civil as Clotaire
  - Malik Frikah as Clotaire (17 years old)
- Alain Chabat as Jackie's father
- Benoît Poelvoorde as La Brosse
- Vincent Lacoste as Jeffrey
- Élodie Bouchez as Clotaire's mother
- Karim Leklou as Clotaire's father
- Jean-Pascal Zadi as Lionel
- Raphaël Quenard as Kiki
- Anthony Bajon as Tony
- Louis Raison as Clotaire (12 years old)

== Production ==
=== Development ===
On 2 September 2013, Gilles Lellouche said in an interview for the French radio station France Inter that he was going to direct an adaptation of Neville Thompson's 1997 Irish novel Jackie Loves Johnser OK?. Lellouche described the project as "an ultra-violent romantic comedy". It was actor Benoît Poelvoorde who gave Lellouche a copy of the book and told him he should adapt it into a film. Lellouche fell in love with the story and started writing the screenplay together with Poelvoorde, but it did not work out, so Lellouche decided to continue writing alone. Lellouche then co-wrote the screenplay with Ahmed Hamidi and Audrey Diwan, who started writing it in 2019.

On 9 July 2021, a teaser poster for the film describing it as "an ultra-violent musical and romantic comedy" with a 2023 release date on it was unveiled in a special issue of Variety at the Marché du Film during the Cannes Film Festival, but the cast was still unknown.

The film is a co-production between France's Chi-Fou-Mi Productions, Trésor Films, StudioCanal, France 2 Cinéma and Cool Industrie, with a budget initially announced in May 2023 as being €32 million ($34 million), making it StudioCanal's biggest investment in a French-language film. The Belgian companies Artémis Productions, RTBF, Proximus, BeTV and Shelter Prod co-produced the film. Belgium's Tax Shelter later revealed in April 2024 that the film's total budget was €35,059,149 million. According to Cineuropa in an article published on 26 March 2024 citing CNC (National Centre for Cinema and the Moving Image)'s 2023 report, the total budget was €35.7 million.

Producers Alain Attal and Hugo Sélignac described the film as "a love rollercoaster, mixing love, violence and dance." The dance collective (La)Horde was hired to create three dances for the film. The soundtrack will feature 1980s and 1990s songs from artists such as The Cure, New Order, Madonna, Nas, and Jay-Z. The film is set in the 1970s, 1980s and 1990s.

Lellouche cited Martin Scorsese, Quentin Tarantino and West Side Story (1957) as references for the film.

=== Casting ===
François Civil and Adèle Exarchopoulos were announced in the lead roles in a casting call for extras published on 7 February 2023, which also announced that filming would take place between May and September 2023. Lellouche had previously co-starred with Civil and Exarchopoulos in the 2021 film BAC Nord, whose screenplay was co-written by Audrey Diwan.

Élodie Bouchez was announced in the cast on 28 March 2023. The full cast (Mallory Wanecque, Malik Frikah, Alain Chabat, Benoît Poelvoorde, Vincent Lacoste, Jean-Pascal Zadi, Karim Leklou, Raphaël Quenard and Anthony Bajon) was revealed on 21 May 2023, when producer Hugo Sélignac shared on Instagram the poster for the film that was featured on the cover of that day's issue of the French magazine Le Film français.

=== Filming ===
Principal photography began on 9 May 2023. Shooting lasted for 18 weeks, 88 days, and wrapped up on 15 September 2023. Filming took place in several regions of France such as Villeneuve-d'Ascq, Dunkirk, Lille, Douai, Valenciennes, Cambrai, Avesnes-sur-Helpe, Calais, Saint-Omer, Béthune, Lens, Arras, Boulogne-sur-Mer and Montreuil-sur-Mer, and at the Institut Saint-Henri de Comines in Comines-Warneton, Belgium.

=== Post-production ===
In an interview with French journalist Pierre Lescure on the French TV show Beau Geste in October 2023, Lellouche said the film would have "at least 3 hours of runtime". Lellouche later confirmed the 3-hour runtime in an interview with Variety in January 2024. However, in May 2024, the official website of the Cannes Film Festival listed the runtime as 2 hours and 46 minutes, which was later confirmed by reviews such as the one published by Screen Daily after the film was screened at Cannes.

On 13 October 2024, Lellouche told Le Parisien that the first version of the film in January 2024 was 4 hours long, and that he kept editing the film after it premiered at Cannes in May 2024 and cut off a dance scene and two sequences of violence that made François Civil's character "look stupid, not nice," he said. On 14 October 2024, Lellouche said in an interview on the French TV show C à vous that he was editing and reworking the ending of the film up until the previous weekend, a few days before the film's theatrical release in France on 16 October 2024. The version of the film released in French theaters was 2 hours and 41 minutes long.

== Release ==
The film had its world premiere in official competition at the Cannes Film Festival on 23 May 2024. It was also featured in the Limelight section of the 54th International Film Festival Rotterdam to be screened in February 2025.

The film was released theatrically on 16 October 2024 in France by StudioCanal and in Belgium by Cinéart.

The film will be released outside France with the title Beating Hearts. It was the first film to be co-acquired by Canal Plus, Netflix and France Télévisions. The film was introduced to buyers at Unifrance's Rendez-Vous in Paris in January 2024.

== Reception ==
=== Critical response ===
Beating Hearts was the lowest-rated film in official competition at the 2024 Cannes Film Festival. Screen Daily's Cannes jury grid gave the film a rating of 1.3 out of 4 stars, stating: "Lellouche's epic romance, known as L'Amour Ouf in French markets, scored one zero (bad) from Mathieu Macharet at Le Monde, followed by seven one stars (poor) and four two stars." It also had the worst score on the French cinema website Chaos Reign, which collected the reviews from several French and international newspapers and magazines and gave the film a rating of 0.9 out of 4 stars, and the worst score on the American website Ioncinema, which compiled the reviews from 20 French and international publications and gave the film a rating of 1.6 out of 5 stars. Metacritic included the film on its list of worst films from the 2024 Cannes Film Festival.

On the review aggregator website Rotten Tomatoes, 33% of 18 critics' reviews are positive, with an average rating of 5.1/10. Metacritic, which uses a weighted average, assigned the film a score of 50 out of 100, based on 7 critics, indicating "mixed or average" reviews.

Adam Sanchez of GQ France wrote; "Gilles Lellouche disappoints with his symphony of big muscles and broken hearts".

Arjun Sajip of IndieWire gave the film a B+ score and pointed out the film's disappointing treatment of its sole character of color, "Clotaire's loyal friend Lionel, whose entire role as both a kid and an ill-fated young man is restricted to being the target of racial slurs, the sidekick or the comic relief. (Those who saw Lellouche's previous feature, Sink or Swim, may recall a similar superficiality in the writing of that film's principal character of color.)".

Tim Grierson of Screen Daily praised the performances of Malik Frikah and Mallory Wanecque as the teenagers Clotaire and Jackie, but also criticized the lack of chemistry between François Civil and Adèle Exarchopoulos as the adult versions of the two leads: "Unfortunately, once the couple is reunited in their 20s, the film's buzzy high dissipates. No matter the grittiness of Exarchopoulos and Civil, meant to suggest how these teens were beaten down by life, their rapport isn't nearly as sparkling as before. This is, partly, the point, as the adult Jackie and Clotaire warily try to reconnect, but Beating Hearts' knowingly over-the-top ending requires an intense chemistry the two adult leads cannot fully muster."

Writing for the American website The Playlist, Gregory Ellwood gave the film a C− score, stating: "there is little Lellouche does over the first hour to portray the teenage romance between the two as life-changing. Despite Frikah and Wanecque's obvious talents, the pair aren't selling a love affair for the ages. That makes it a bit difficult to be invested in whatever happens next." [...] "As the film progresses, the narrative choices somehow become even less believable and Lellouche begins to throw everything and the kitchen sink at the screen. There are recurring dance numbers (sorta), a cringe-worthy montage giving cliche '90s American hip-hop music video, and a prelude that turns out to be utterly pointless. At one point, a perfectly timed car explosion occurs right after Clotaire slams someone and you wonder, is this meant to be self-aware? Has Lellouche seen Hot Fuzz? Does he think this is cool?" [...] Ellwood also pointed out the lack of chemistry between the film's leading actors: "Like their younger counterparts, perhaps if Civil had Exarchopoulos had some genuine on-screen chemistry all would be forgiven. Maybe Beating Hearts would be worth its wild and bumpy ride. But, oh, no. We've still got 20 minutes left. Strap in."

Jordan Mintzer of The Hollywood Reporter called the film "overblown and downright vulgar at times," and wrote: "If you took Magnolia, Goodfellas, Boyz n the Hood and perhaps Claude Lelouch's A Man and a Woman, plugged them all into the latest version of ChatGPT and asked it to spit out a brand new film, you could wind up with something like Gilles Lellouche's (no relation to Claude) swooning French crime romance, Beating Hearts (L'Amour ouf)", and also that "Clotaire and Jackie also come across as caricatures of the French working-class, unable to control themselves or their emotions because that's apparently what working-class kids are like. Lellouche divides the world into stereotypes that he amplifies in nearly every scene, as if the drama will somehow be believable if everyone screams their lungs out. This happens quite a lot throughout the movie and especially during the last hour — the film clocks in at a gut-busting 166 minutes".

Writing for the American website First Showing, Alex Billington said: "Putting two good-looking people into your movie doesn't automatically mean they have chemistry nor does it make their love story fascinating. I thought they weren't even allowed to make movies with a plot this unoriginal anymore - it's the most banal relationship ever. Smart girl with the bad boy. And that's it? Unfortunately yes. This three hours spent on that basic of a love story? By the time we get to the part of the story where Adèle Exarchopoulos shows up, even she seems like she doesn't want to be in this movie anymore, serving up an entirely lackluster performance where she's supposed to have dormant feelings for this guy she hasn't seen in 12 years. This is after she marries some slick asshole (Vincent Lacoste) who fires her from her job then hits on her. Isn't this kind of misogynistic storytelling illegal? I guess not in France yet. This movie is an epic waste of three hours that doesn't offer a single ounce of anything tantalizing or exciting or romantic in its many widescreen vistas. It's derivative filmmaking at its worst and hopefully will be ignored by audiences. Just watch La La Land or Cherbourg again instead of this."

Writing for the French newspaper Le Parisien, Catherine Balle wrote: "What is first surprising in this feature film, is its form. We were told it was a musical: only two dance scenes slip into these 2h46 punctuated by hits from the 80s (The Cure, Prince…), where the actors never sing. Then, it is its subject. Is L'Amour ouf a romantic comedy or a gangster film? Between the two, between Before Sunrise and BAC Nord, Gilles Lellouche's heart wavered. And the filmmaker did not decide”, and also: "we are bothered by the complacency of the screenplay with regard to the outbursts of its hero."

For Juliette Hochberg of the French magazine Marie Claire, "Beating Hearts is not a musical comedy, as it was announced here and there, but the precise work of the sound, even more of the silence, offers a total spectacle. It is not a romantic, "idealisable" model either. Clotaire accumulates more fits of anger than green flags."

Samuel Douhaire of the French magazine Télérama wrote that "Lellouche wants to do Paul Thomas Anderson, Martin Scorsese, John Woo and Jacques Demy at the same time – That's a lot for a single film, even if it lasts almost three hours, especially when you don't yet have the talent of either, and his very sentimental vision of love is that of an eternal teenager. From this interminable and, ultimately, exhausting hodgepodge, we will nevertheless save the first hour, carried by the young and formidable Mallory Wanecque (discovered at the end of 2022 in The Worst Ones) and Malik Frikah. The touching performance of Alain Chabat as a protective and complicit father. And a beautiful dialogue sequence, tender then tense, between Jackie, Clotaire and a contemptuous supermarket manager, where, for once, Gilles Lellouche refrains from being smart with his camera."

For Céline Rouden of the French newspaper La Croix, "nothing is right in this film which pushes all the sliders to the limit: saturated colours, omnipresent music, non-existent dialogues and affected staging whose overexcited energy poorly masks the absence of purpose, when it does not refer to a simplistic morality", [...] "A French Romeo + Juliet (1996) which undoubtedly seeks to ogle Baz Luhrmann and his excesses but produces only a pale imitation and even sinks into ridicule."

Julien Rousset of the French newspaper Sud Ouest called the film "a huge disappointment". "The disappointment is all the greater. It is no longer the big bath but the big vain, a long clip of two hours and forty-six drowned in a deluge of music and violence." Gautier Roos wrote for the French website Chaos Reign that "nothing in this film justifies the money spent on the screen, nor this duration of 2h46, nor the epic breath that this story of love prevented by destiny would like to embody."

Peter Bradshaw of The Guardian gave the film 2 out of 5 stars and wrote that it "aims for a Springsteenesque blue-collar energy but buckles under the weight of its own naivety."

For the French website Écran Large, "Beating Hearts pushes the limits. The result is an excessive, disproportionate and very clumsy work, whose rare sensitivity is weighed down by its bloated artifices and almost glorified violence."

Fabien Lemercier of Cineuropa wrote: "This fireworks display with a €35 million budget is the opposite of finesse and will undoubtedly find its audience thanks to a fittingly aggressive marketing campaign, but it would have been much more reasonable not to launch it in competition at the 77th Cannes Film Festival where even if masters of cinema can sometimes get tired, a certain artistic excellence is still de rigueur."

Stéphane Gobbo of the Swiss newspaper Le Temps stated that Beating Hearts is not a musical comedy and that there were better films screened out of competition at the 2024 Cannes Film Festival that deserved to take its place in official competition.

=== Accolades ===
Award / Film festival	Date of ceremony	Category	Recipient(s)	Result	Ref(s)
Cannes Film Festival	25 May 2024	Palme d'Or	Gilles Lellouche	Nominated	
César Awards	28 February 2025	Best Director	Gilles Lellouche	Nominated	
César Awards	28 February 2025	Best Actor	François Civil	Nominated	
César Awards	28 February 2025	Best Actress	Adèle Exarchopoulos	Nominated	
César Awards	28 February 2025	Best Supporting Actor	Alain Chabat	Won	
César Awards	28 February 2025	Best Supporting Actress	Élodie Bouchez	Nominated	
César Awards	28 February 2025	Best Male Revelation	Malik Frikah	Nominated	
César Awards	28 February 2025	Best Female Revelation	Mallory Wanecque	Nominated	
César Awards	28 February 2025	Best Cinematography	Laurent Tangy	Nominated	
César Awards	28 February 2025	Best Editing	Simon Jacquet	Nominated	
César Awards	28 February 2025	Best Sound	Cédric Deloche, Gwennolé Le Borgne, Jon Goc and Marc Doisne	Nominated	
César Awards	28 February 2025	Best Original Music	Jon Brion	Nominated	
César Awards	28 February 2025	Best Costume Design	Isabelle Pannetier	Nominated	
César Awards	28 February 2025	Best Production Design	Jean-Philippe Moreaux	Nominated	
Magritte Awards	22 February 2025	Best Supporting Actor	Benoît Poelvoorde	Nominated	
