= Francis Renaud (actor) =

French actor

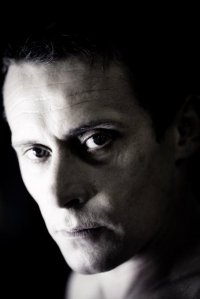
Francis Renaud

Francis Renaud (born 27 September 1967, in Thionville, Moselle) is a French film and television actor.

Following his experience of a festival dedicated to sick children at Metzervisse (Moselle) he became a patron of the Association Anim'Metzervisse.

== Filmography ==
- 1994: Pigalle directed by Karim Dridi - Fifi
- 1996: Parfait Amour !, directed by Catherine Breillat - Christophe
- 1997: Quai n° 1 - Season 1 - Série TV - episode : 5 - Mickey
- 1997: Le Plaisir (et ses petits tracas), directed by Nicolas Boukhrief - Raphael
- 1999: Un possible amour de Christophe Lamotte
- 2000: Scénarios sur la drogue : Avalanche (collectif)
- 2000: Police District - Season 1 - Série TV - Norbert
- 2001: Police District - Season 2 - Série TV - Norbert
- 2001: Gangsters by Olivier Marchal - Rocky
- 2002: Police District - Season 3 - Série TV - Norbert
- 2003: Les Rivières pourpres 2 - Les anges de l'apocalypse, directed by Olivier Dahan - Un flic
- 2002: La Mentale, de Manuel Boursinhac - Niglo
- 2003: Des plumes dans la tête, directed by Thomas de Thier - Jean-Pierre Charlier
- 2004: 36 Quai des Orfèvres, directed by Olivier Marchal - Titi Brasseur
- 2004: Zodiaque - Saison 1 - Série TV - Félix Vogel
- 2006: Le Cri - TV Mini-Series - Robert Panaud
- 2006: Avatar, directed by Julien Leclercq
- 2006: Anna M., directed by Michel Spinosa - Albert
- 2006: Docteur X, directed by Arnaud Duprey
- 2006: L'Affaire Villemin, TV series in episodes created by Raoul Peck and written by Pascal Bonitzer, for France 3
- 2007: Le Deuxième souffle d'Alain Corneau - Letourneur
- 2007: Scorpion, directed by Julien Seri
- 2007: La Commune, TV series in 8 episodes created by Canal +
- 2007: Chrysalis, directed by Julien Leclercq
- 2007: Belleville tour directed by Zakia Bouchaala and Ahmed Bouchaala (TV) - Paul
- 2008: MR 73 directed by Olivier Marchal
- 2009: Queen to Play (Joueuse) directed by Caroline Bottaro – Ange
- 2009: Mutants
- 2009: Un village français (season 1)
- 2009: Braquo (season 2) directed by Olivier Marchal
- 2012: Aux yeux de tous 'Otar' directed by Cédric Jimenez

== Producer ==
- 1999 : Marie, Nonna, la Vierge et moi
