= Malik Frikah =

French actor and breakdancer (born 2006)

- Born: 18 July 2006 (age 20); Alès, France
- Occupations: Actor; breakdancer
- Years active: 2015–present

Malik Frikah (born 18 July 2006) is a French actor and professional breakdancer. Frikah started competing in breakdancing championships as a child, becoming World Champion at the age of 10 in the Under-12 category at the 2017 Toulouse Battle Pro. He started acting in small parts in 2021 and had a starring role in the romantic drama Beating Hearts (2024), for which he earned a nomination for the César Award for Best Male Revelation.

== Early life ==
Frikah was born on 18 July 2006 in Alès, in the Occitania region in Southern France. His father is Jawad Frikah, a Hip hop dancer who is the founder, teacher and director of the dance school All'Style in Alès. His mother is also a dance teacher.

Following in his father's footsteps, Frikah began breakdancing at the age of 3, having his father as his coach.

== Career ==
=== Dancing ===
Frikah started competing in breakdancing championships as a child. At the age of 8, he participated in the 2015 Chelles Battle Pro national battle in Paris in the Under-12 category. In March 2017, at the age of 10, Frikah became the World Champion in breakdancing in the Under-12 category at the Toulouse Battle Pro after winning all the regional and national phases, becoming the second French dancer to win the World title.

In 2018, Frikah won the 1on1 Kids category at the LCB Battle 2018 in Liège, Belgium.

=== Acting ===
Frikah started acting when his mother suggested he should work as an extra in a local film shoot. He enjoyed that experience and decided he wanted to be an actor. He quit school and dancing to concentrate on his acting career. His mother left her job to support his dream and accompanied him to auditions.

In 2021, Frikah had a small role in the first episode of season 13 of the television series Camping Paradis, broadcast by TF1.

He made his film debut in Frank Bellocq's romantic comedy Stuck with You (2022), and had small parts in films such as Romain Quirot's action thriller Apaches: Gang of Paris (2023), and Pierre-François Martin-Laval's adventure comedy Jeff Panacloc: In Pursuit of Jean-Marc (2023).

In 2024, Frikah starred in Gilles Lellouche's romantic drama Beating Hearts as Clotaire, the teenage version of François Civil's character.

== Filmography ==
=== Film ===
Year	Title	Role
2022	Stuck with You	Cousin 1
2023	Apaches: Gang of Paris	Ficelle
2023	Jeff Panacloc: In Pursuit of Jean-Marc	Lucas (12 years old)
2024	Beating Hearts	Clotaire (17 years old)

=== Television ===
Year	Title	Role	Notes
2021	Camping Paradis	Ado 2	TV series; episode "Un cirque au paradis"

== Awards and nominations ==
Year	Award	Category	Work	Result	Ref.
2017	Toulouse Battle Pro	Breakdancing World Champion Under-12	—N/a	Won	
2018	LCB Battle	Breakdancing 1on1 Kids	—N/a	Won	
2024	Prix Ciné Evok	Most Promising Actor	Beating Hearts	Won	
2025	Lumière Awards	Best Male Revelation	Beating Hearts	Nominated	
2025	Q d'Or	Male Revelation	Beating Hearts	Won	
2025	César Awards	Best Male Revelation	Beating Hearts	Nominated	
