= Dog 51 =

- Theatrical release poster
- French: Chien 51
- Directed by: Cédric Jimenez
- Screenplay by: Olivier Demangel; Cédric Jimenez
- Based on: Chien 51 by Laurent Gaudé
- Produced by: Hugo Sélignac
- Starring: Gilles Lellouche; Adèle Exarchopoulos; Louis Garrel; Romain Duris; Valeria Bruni Tedeschi; Artus
- Cinematography: Laurent Tangy
- Edited by: Laure Gardette; Stan Collet
- Music by: Guillaume Roussel
- Production companies: Chi-Fou-Mi Productions; Studiocanal; France 2 Cinéma; Jim Films; Artemis Productions
- Distributed by: Studiocanal
- Release dates: 6 September 2025 (Venice); 15 October 2025 (France)
- Running time: 105 minutes
- Countries: France; Belgium
- Language: French
- Budget: €40–50 million
- Box office: $11 million

Dog 51 (French: Chien 51) is a 2025 science fiction thriller film directed by Cédric Jimenez, co-written with Olivier Demangel and based on the 2022 novel by the same name by Laurent Gaudé. Starring Gilles Lellouche, Adèle Exarchopoulos, Louis Garrel, Romain Duris, Valeria Bruni Tedeschi and Artus, it follows a crime investigation in a dystopian Paris.

The film had its world premiere out of competition at the 82nd Venice International Film Festival on 6 September 2025, and was theatrically released in France on 15 October by Studiocanal in IMAX formats.

== Premise ==
The film is set in a dystopian future, in 2045, in Paris, where people have been segregated into neighborhoods by social class, and police are directed by an artificial intelligence system. When the creator of the system is murdered, investigators Salia and Zem work to solve the case, and in doing so discover alarming information about the authority that governs them.

== Cast ==
- Gilles Lellouche as Zem Brecht
- Adèle Exarchopoulos as Salia Malberg
- Louis Garrel as Jon Mafram
- Romain Duris as Théo Rimarval
- Valeria Bruni Tedeschi as Irina Mitrovna
- Artus as Malik Bouzid
- Stéphane Bak as Cal
- Thomas Bangalter as Kessel
- Lala &ce as Charline
- Hugo Dillon as Luc
- Daphné Patakia as Amel
- Agathe Mougin as Tobo
- Jeanne Herry as Lucy Monk
- Féodor Atkine as the pastor

== Production ==
An international co-production between France and Belgium, filming took place in Paris and Marseille over eighteen weeks, with an estimated production budget is €40–50 million.

== Release ==
The film debuted at the 82nd Venice International Film Festival on 6 September 2025. For its North American premiere, the film was programmed as a special presentation at the 2025 Toronto International Film Festival. It was released in French theaters on 15 October 2025.

== Reception ==
=== Box office ===
The film had 1.38 million admissions at the French box office, grossing $11 million against a budget of €40 million.

It was the fourth most popular French film of 2025, behind Jean-Paul Rouve's God Save The Tuche, Ken Scott's Once Upon My Mother and Franck Dubosc's How to Make a Killing.

=== Critical response ===
Screen Daily's critic Lee Marshall found the film to be an engaging near-future dystopian thriller infusing "Parisian romance, energy and sex appeal" into police crime drama tropes and elements derivative of the Blade Runner and The Hunger Games. He praised the chemistry between Lellouche and Exarchopoulos, and described the world-building and the narrative's pacing as efficient. While describing the film as accessible entertainment and "by no means an arthouse movie", he remarked that some themes might find better resonance in France than internationally.

== See also ==
- List of French films of 2025
