= Akamz =

French social media personality (born 2000)

- Born: Jonathan Akamba; 20 October 2000 (age 26)
- Other names: Akamz Tweenty, Akamz Twenty
- Occupation: Social media personality
- Years active: 2017–present
- Known for: Humoristic videos on TikTok

Jonathan Akamba (born 20 October 2000) known by his stage name Akamz is a French dancer, comedian and social media personality.

As of February 2023, with 23 million followers, he is the most followed French user on TikTok.

== Early life ==
Akamba grew up in Boissy-Saint-Léger.

== Career ==
In 2018, Akamba became famous in a viral Instagram video by singing and dancing Frère Jacques in a McDonald's.

== Public image ==
Akamba collaborates multiple times with Hugo Boss. In January 2023, he participated at an exclusive event for the BOSS x Perfect Moment's collection with celebrities like Khaby Lame, Naomi Watanabe, Paola Locatelli.

== Personal life ==
On 21 July 2022, Akamba was a victim of racism in place de l'Opéra, in Paris. A white old lady called him a monkey.

== See also ==
- List of most-followed TikTok accounts
