= The Flower of Evil (film) =

2003 film

- Directed by: Claude Chabrol
- Written by: Caroline Eliacheff; Louise L. Lambrichs; Adaptation and dialogue by Claude Chabrol
- Produced by: Marin Karmitz
- Starring: Nathalie Baye; Benoît Magimel; Bernard Le Coq; Suzanne Flon; Mélanie Doutey
- Cinematography: Eduardo Serra
- Edited by: Monique Fardoulis
- Music by: Matthieu Chabrol
- Distributed by: MK2 Diffusion
- Release date: 2003
- Running time: 104 minutes
- Country: France
- Language: French

The Flower of Evil (original title: La fleur du mal) is a 2003 French psychological thriller film by Claude Chabrol that deals with incest, murder and betrayal.

Three generations of a wealthy Bordeaux family are involved in social turmoil when one (Anne) runs for political office due to an anonymous political pamphlet that revives an old murder scandal and Nazi involvement within the family.

== Plot ==
In a grand old house in Bordeaux lives Gérard, owner of a successful local pharmaceutical business. A drinker and ladies man, Gérard disgusts his son François, who has just returned to the house from Chicago after a number of years living there. To Gérard's disgust, his second wife Anne is a candidate in the municipal election.

Her daughter by Anne's first marriage, Michèle, is romantically excited by the return of François who responds in a similar fashion. The morning after a big family reunion dinner, Michèle and François go off for a weekend at Pyla-sur-Mer, where they become lovers. Anne's old aunt Line encourages the pair to do this, lending them her car and soon coming for a visit.

Anne's campaign takes a jolt when she and her family are smeared in an anonymous tract. Some of the family suspects that Gérard is the author. Not everybody believes the slanders and the outgoing mayor, impressed by Anne's qualities, promises her his job if she wins a seat.

With François and Michèle back in the house, on the night of the vote count everybody is at the town hall, except Michèle, who must finish an assignment for her university degree in psychology. A drunken Gérard sneaks into the house and Michèle's room and begins to sexually harass her. He grabs her for a kiss and Michèle resists. In the pursuing struggle, Michèle hits Gérard on the head with a lamp base and he falls and hits his head on the table and instantly dies.

Michèle is panicky, but Aunt Line comes to help her cover up this impulsive murder. After they move the body out Michèle's room, Aunt Line confesses to Michèle that she had loved her brother too closely until he was executed in the Second World War by the Nazis as a member of the French Resistance. The man who ordered the execution was their father, who was a Nazi collaborator. Knowing this, the young Line had killed her father and now, partly out of guilt for doing so, says that she will take the blame for Michèle's killing of Gérard.

Ironically, the film ends there with this revelation as a cavalcade of hooting cars sweep into the driveway of the house and Anne and her supporters throng into the house for champagne to toast Anne's political victory.

== Cast ==
- Nathalie Baye : Anne / Wife
- Benoît Magimel : François / Gerard's son
- Suzanne Flon : Aunt Line
- Bernard Le Coq : Gérard / Husband
- Mélanie Doutey : Michèle / Anne's daughter
- Thomas Chabrol : Matthieu Lartigue
- Henri Attal : Fanny's Father-in-law
- Françoise Bertin : Thérèse

== Reception ==
On Rotten Tomatoes the film holds an approval rating of 64% based on 61 reviews. Detroit Free Press said: "The strength of this movie is how it starts as a standard whodunit only to become something else: a cunning Chabrol study of incest and old money peppered with a wicked sense of humor." SFGate remarked "Chabrol's examination of intergenerational guilt takes a while to arrive at the station, but the characters and dialogue [...] are sophisticated and properly witty." Wesley Morris in The Boston Globe said: "If it's not vintage Claude Chabrol, it's at least vintage mediocre Claude Chabrol. His umpteenth housebound suspicion-fest is one of his more inexplicable adventures in secrets and scandal." Slant Magazine called it "a disappointment", and added "Chabrol has always been hung-up on bourgeois rituals, hypocrisies, and idiosyncrasies, but every observation here is mundane or simply inconsequential to the film’s larger and severely undervalued dialectic of a so-called 'perpetual present'."

== Awards and nominations ==
=== Entry ===
Berlin International Film Festival Official Selection

=== Nominated ===
Goya Awards

- Best European Film (lost to Good Bye Lenin!)
