= The Connection (2014 film) =

2014 French-Belgian crime film

- Theatrical release poster
- Directed by: Cédric Jimenez
- Written by: Audrey Diwan; Cédric Jimenez
- Produced by: Alain Goldman
- Starring: Jean Dujardin; Gilles Lellouche; Céline Sallette; Mélanie Doutey; Benoît Magimel; Guillaume Gouix; Bruno Todeschini; Moussa Maaskri; Cyril Lecomte; Bernard Blancan
- Cinematography: Laurent Tangy
- Edited by: Sophie Reine
- Music by: Guillaume Roussel
- Production companies: Gaumont; Légende Films
- Distributed by: Gaumont (France); Alternative Films (Belgium)
- Release dates: 10 September 2014 (TIFF); 3 December 2014 (France)
- Running time: 135 minutes
- Countries: France; Belgium
- Language: French
- Budget: $25 million
- Box office: $12.1 million

The Connection (French: La French) is a 2014 historical crime action thriller film directed by Cédric Jimenez and produced by Alain Goldman. The film was inspired by the events of the French Connection in the 1970s, starring Jean Dujardin as police magistrate Pierre Michel and Gilles Lellouche as Gaëtan "Tany" Zampa, a drug gang ringleader. The film premiered at the Toronto International Film Festival on 10 September 2014.

== Plot ==
1970s Marseille is ruled by a brutal drug gang importing morphine from Turkey, transforming it into heroin and exporting the product to New York City under the gang name la French. The gang, led by the cold-hearted Gaëtan Tany Zampa, is boosting its income from drug trafficking by doing extortion and robberies. Former Juvenile Court judge Pierre Michel is transferred to an organized crime unit, but finds out that la French's crimes are difficult or impossible to prove and that the police unit investigating heroin trade under Captain Aimé-Blanc has nothing relevant to report.

Following a tip given by one of Michel's informants, the heroin-addicted teenager Lily, they arrest Charles Peretti, an old Corsican chemist who formerly produced heroin for la French. After he refuses to give information about the gang and its leader, preferring to spend the rest of his life in prison rather than risk his life by collaborating with police, the gang murders Lily and her friend, Fabrizio Mandonato, Peretti's nephew. Enraged by Tany killing his informers and because he can find out nothing relevant about the gang, Michel orders all lower cadres of la French arrested, "cutting the octopus' arms". Feeling menaced by the aggressive behaviour of the new judge, one of Tany's lieutenants, "Le Fou", breaks with the gang leader. While trying to take over Zampa's criminal business, Le Fou is shot and wounded by Zampa and his men, but escapes from hospital and begins a bloody feud, killing two of the gang's leaders, Franky and Robert, both close friends of Tany. Enraged and grieving, Tany retaliates by brutally killing Le Fou's girlfriend and numerous innocent bystanders. Fearing the criminal feud will take more lives and appealing to the procurator, Michel manages to get illegal surveillance on all the criminals involved in the feud, successfully avoiding the confrontation between Tany and Le Fou and arresting Le Fou.

Michel suffers an emotional breakdown, caused by his heavy workload and his feelings of helplessness. Michel then has to deal with his wife's gradual abandonment of him. While surveilling one of Marseille's casinos controlled by the gang, Michel has a short look in a side room and sees one of the leading figures of the narcotics squad, police veteran Ange Mariette, chatting with Zampa. Pressing the younger cop Alvarez, Michel finds out that Mariette is the leader of a large gang of corrupt Corsican police officers. Mariette and many other officers in the police narcotics team are on Zampa's payroll and tip him off about police investigations.

With help from the DEA, Michel gets Marco Da Costa, an associate of Zampa, to turn state's witness. Michel is assassinated for his efforts against la French, but Zampa is finally arrested. Afterward, Michel is publicly touted as a hero for his work against drug trafficking.

== Cast ==
- Jean Dujardin as Pierre Michel
- Gilles Lellouche as Gaëtan "Tany" Zampa
- Céline Sallette as Jacqueline Michel
- Mélanie Doutey as Christiane Zampa
- Guillaume Gouix as José Alvarez
- Benoît Magimel as Le Fou
- Bruno Todeschini as Le Banquier
- Moussa Maaskri as Franky Manzoni
- Féodor Atkine as Gaston Defferre
- Myriem Akheddiou as Melle Aissani
- Eric Godon as Zampa's lawyer
- Pauline Burlet as Lily
- Pierre Lopez as Jean Paci
- Éric Collado as Robert
- Cyril Lecomte as Marco Da Costa
- Jean-Pierre Sanchez as Fabrizio Mandonato
- Georges Neri as Charles Peretti
- Bernard Blancan as Lucien Aimé-Blanc
- Gérard Meylan as Ange Mariette
- Patrick Descamps as The prosecutor

== Reception ==
The Connection received generally positive reviews. The review aggregator website Rotten Tomatoes reports a 75% approval rating with an average rating of 6.5/10 based on 69 reviews. The website's consensus reads, "The Connection doesn't do itself any favors by forcing comparisons to The French Connection, but it's a reasonably entertaining thriller in its own right." On Metacritic, it has a score of 67 out of 100 based on 18 reviews, indicating "generally favorable reviews".

Reviewer Rudolph Herzog from Newsweek stated that the film, "[s]et in the 1970s,...captures the gutter charm of a town [Marseilles] that was never cleaned up and is as poisonous as it is attractive." Film critic Liam Lacey from the Canadian national newspaper The Globe and Mail called the film a "...byzantine, if ultimately conventional, heroic tale that feels like a guided tour down a familiar alley", giving the movie a 2.5/4 score.

Reviewer Ty Burr from the Boston Globe called the film "...a stylish affair, very solidly made if not exactly breaking new ground in our understanding of events or in the way the movies depict them" and gave it a 2.5/4 score. Critic Bill Goodykoontz from the Arizona Republic stated while that the film "...may prove too slow for some and the meandering can be a little maddening,... overall it's worth the effort. Goodykoontz gave the film a 3.5/5 score. Film critic Soren Anderson from the Seattle Times stated that the film "...starts with gunshots - a Mercedes and its driver are riddled by motorcycle-riding assassins in broad daylight - and the pace of "The Connection" is bang-bang brisk most of the rest of the way"; he gave the film a 3/4 score.

Colin Covert from the Minneapolis Star Tribune stated that while the "...story lacks focus here and there, the film never feels overplayed. It's a work of bloody style and solid substance"; Covert gave the movie a 3.5/4 score. Critic Stephanie Merry from the Washington Post stated that the film "...isn't all that different from a lot of police procedurals that have come before, but there's something about this particular gritty true-crime story that still fascinates all these years later"; Merry gave the film a 3/4 score.

Reviewer Tom Long from the Detroit News gave a negative review of the film, writing that "[g]angster movies should not [just] be mildly interesting", which is how he found the movie; Long gave the film a C−. Mick LaSalle from the San Francisco Chronicle called the film "[r]iveting from its first moments,...fascinating in its presentation of character, as well as for its glimpse into the workings of an international drug empire and into the ways an imaginative cop found to chip at its power"; LaSalle gave the movie a 4/4 score. Film critic Cary Darling from the Fort Worth Star-Telegram stated that while "...[t]here are no elaborate car chases or dizzyingly choreographed shootouts[,]...it's nonetheless a compelling portrait of two men in a specific time and place"; Darling gave the movie a score of 4/5.

Critic Tom Huddleston from Time Out noted the film's "...schnozz-tacular array of craggy-faced macho men" and gave the film a score of 3/5. Peter Rainer from the Christian Science Monitor stated that the film suffers from a "...common problem in crime-centric movies: The bad guys are almost always more fascinating than the good guys... Dujardin's bull-necked, hard-charging performance makes Pierre a worthy adversary"; Rainer gave the movie a B score. Chris Nashawaty from Entertainment Weekly stated that the "...sprawling cat-and-mouse thriller loses momentum and focus in the homestretch, but until then its '70s sun-and-sin-on-the-Côte d'Azur vibe is electric"; Nashawaty gave the movie a B+. Robert Abele from the Los Angeles Times stated that "[d]espite the pedestrian screenplay (by Jimenez and Audrey Diwan), Dujardin and Lellouche are magnetic performers who slip easily into their antagonistic roles." Jeannette Catsoulis from the New York Times stated that "How can you dislike a film that signals a killing with "Bang Bang" and a villain with "The Snake"?"

Mike D'Angelo from The A.V. Club states that "Jimenez, making his second feature, fails to provide the regular jolts of electricity this material needs"; D'Angelo gave the film a C+. Alan Scherstuhl from the Village Voice stated that the film is "...engaging, propulsive, cut with rare brio, chockablock with consummate tough-guy business." Peter Debruge from Variety states that "Jimenez adopts a vintage-kitsch sensibility, taking a disappointingly generic approach to his hard-to-follow narrative." John DeFore from The Hollywood Reporter calls the film a "...procedural epic whose complicated narrative is propelled by visceral action sequences and an unusually thrilling soundtrack."

== Awards and nominations ==
| Award / Film Festival | Category | Recipients and nominees | Result |
|---|---|---|---|
| César Awards | Best Production Design | Jean-Philippe Moreaux | Nominated |
| César Awards | Best Costume Design | Carine Sarfati | Nominated |
| Lumière Awards | Best Screenplay | Audrey Diwan and Cédric Jimenez | Nominated |
| Sarasota Film Festival | Audience Award - World Cinema | | Won |
