= Mutants (2009 film) =

- Official Teaser Poster
- Directed by: David Morlet
- Written by: Louis-Paul Desanges; David Morlet
- Produced by: Alain Benguigui; Thomas Verhaeghe
- Starring: Hélène de Fougerolles; Dida Diafat; Francis Renaud
- Cinematography: Nicolas Massart
- Edited by: David Morlet
- Production companies: Sombrero Productions; Région Picardie; CNC; Cofinova 4 Canal+ CinéCinéma; TPS Star
- Distributed by: CTV International; Barnholtz Entertainment
- Release date: 31 January 2009
- Running time: 95 minutes
- Country: France
- Language: French

Mutants is a French science-fiction horror film based on a screenplay from Louis-Paul Desanges and David Morlet It was directed by French filmmaker David Morlet and stars Hélène de Fougerolles, Dida Diafat and Francis Renaud.

== Plot ==
A virus has transformed the vast majority of humanity into bloodthirsty, zombie creatures. Marco and Sonia are young couple fleeing the "mutants" and trying to fight their way to a military base. But when Marco himself becomes infected in an attack, the pregnant Sonia must fight the worst enemy – the man she loves.

== Cast ==
- Hélène de Fougerolles as Sonia
- Francis Renaud as Marco
- Dida Diafat as Virgile
- Marie-Sohna Condé as Perez
- Nicolas Briançon as Franck
- Luz Mandon as Dany
- Driss Ramdi as Abel
- Grégory Givernaud as Paul
- Justine Bruneau de la Salle as young girl
- Jérémy Loth as mutant
- Sébastien Rouquette as mutant
- Frédéric Troussier as mutant
- Cyril Hipaux as mutant
- Nicolas Leprêtre as mutant
- Cécile Corsalan as mutant
- Emmanuel Lanzi as stuntman mutant
- Frédéric Alhinho as stuntman mutant
- Yves Girard as stuntman mutant
- Patrick Vo as stuntman mutant
- Marie Dang as stuntwoman mutant

== Production ==
The film was shot in a bleak Picardy, scorched in snow and sluiced down in gray.

== Release ==
Mutants premiered on 31 January 2009 as part of the Gérardmer Film Festival and participated in the Festival du Film Français au Japon on 13 March 2009. The United States distribution rights for the film were acquired by IFC Festival Direct and the company was due to release it on 10 February 2010 at Festival Direct on Demand. IFC Films set the US DVD and Blu-ray release for the 26 October 2010.
