= Cédric Jimenez =

French filmmaker

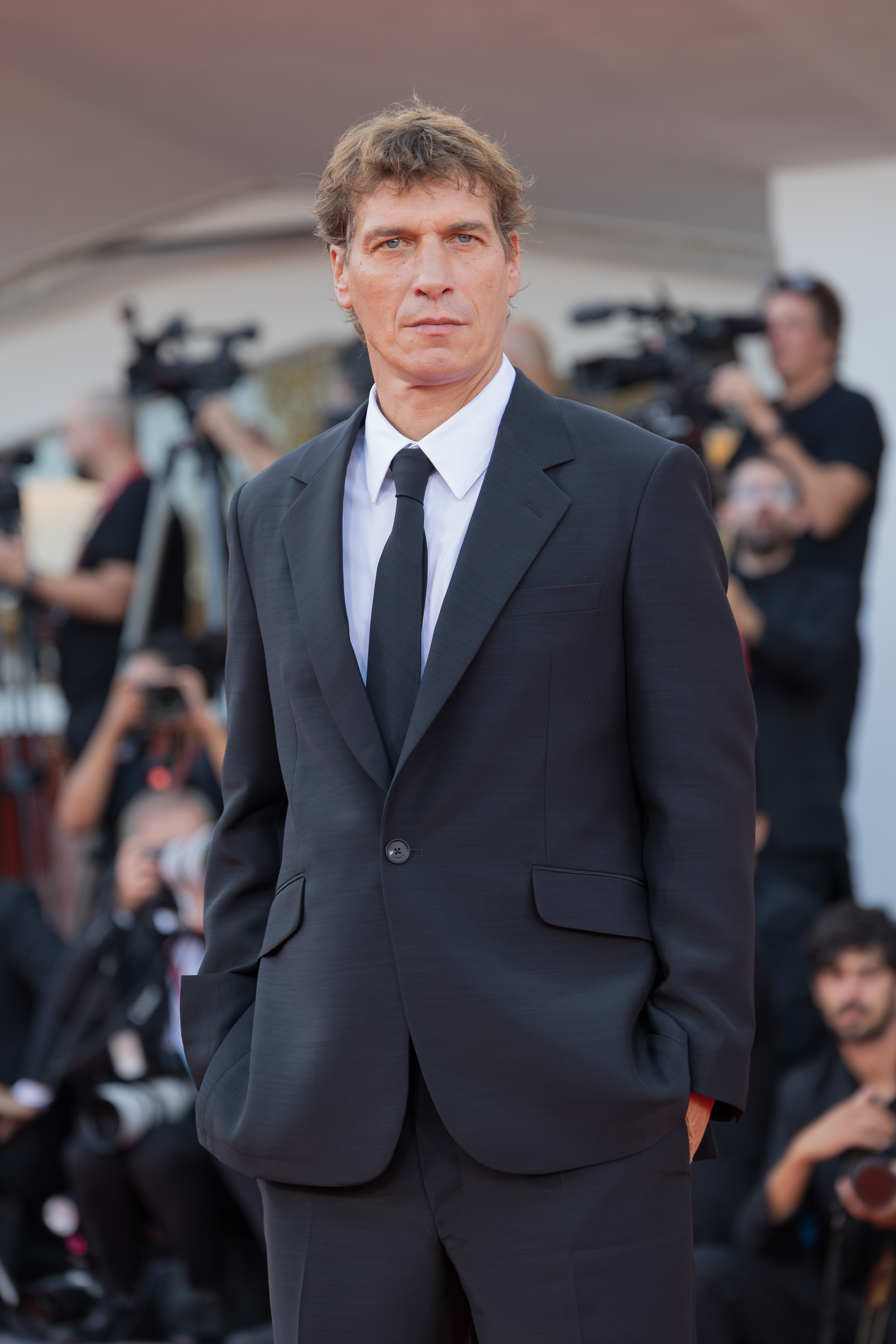
- Jimenez in 2025
- Born: 26 June 1976 (age 50); Marseille, France
- Occupations: Film producer, director, screenwriter
- Years active: 2003–present
- Partner: Audrey Diwan (?–2018)
- Children: 3

Cédric Jimenez (born 26 June 1976) is a French filmmaker and producer. Most known for his political thriller films The Connection (2014), BAC Nord (2021), and November (2022).

== Career ==
=== 2010s ===
Jimenez's debut feature, Paris Under Watch (2012), was co-written and co-directed with Arnaud Duprey, and starred Olivier Barthélémy. It follows a young anonymous hacker who discovers lost security camera footage of a recent terrorist attack at Gare d'Austerlitz in Paris.

His solo directing debut, The Connection (2014), was co-written with his partner Audrey Diwan. Starring Jean Dujardin, it follows the French Connection in the 1970s. The film had its world premiere at the 2014 Toronto International Film Festival.

His English-language debut, The Man with the Iron Heart (2016), was an adaptation of Laurent Binet's prize-winning novel HHhH. co-written with David Farr and Audrey Diwan. Starring Jason Clarke, Rosamund Pike, Mia Wasikowska, Jack O'Connell, and Jack Reynor, it follows the assassination of the Nazi leader Reinhard Heydrich in Prague during World War II. The film was never theatrically released in the United States, due to the bankrupt of The Weinstein Company.

=== 2020s ===
After a small hiatus, Jimenez went back to the French industry with BAC Nord (2021), another thriller film co-written with his partner Audrey Diwan, in their last collaboration. Starring Gilles Lellouche, Karim Leklou, François Civil, and Adèle Exarchopoulos, it is based on a scandal that took place in 2012 within the anti-crime brigade of Marseille where eighteen members were indicted for drug trafficking and racketeering. The film had its world premiere out of competition of the 2021 Cannes Film Festival, where it received positive reviews. At the 47th César Awards, Jimenez received his first Best Director nomination.

November (2022), written by Olivier Demangel and starring Jean Dujardin, Anaïs Demoustier, Sandrine Kiberlain, Jérémie Renier, and Lyna Khoudri, follows the investigations and the interventions of the police (in particular of the anti-terrorist sub-directorate) during the five days which followed the November 2015 Paris attacks. The film had its world premiere out of competition of the 2022 Cannes Film Festival, where it received positive reviews. At the 48th César Awards, Jimenez received his second Best Director nomination.

Dog 51 (2025), co-written with Olivier Demangel, starring Gilles Lellouche, Adèle Exarchopoulos, Louis Garrel, Romain Duris, and Valeria Bruni Tedeschi, marked his first science fiction film, and follows a crime investigation in a dystopian Paris. The film had its world premiere out of competition at the 82nd Venice International Film Festival, and was the fourth most popular French film of 2025, behind Jean-Paul Rouve's God Save The Tuche, Ken Scott's Once Upon My Mother and Franck Dubosc's How to Make a Killing.

=== Upcoming projects ===
Jimenez next feature film, Johnny, is a biopic of the popular French musician Johnny Hallyday, co-written with Olivier Demangel and starring Benjamin Voisin. The film will be theatrically released in France in 2027.

== Personal life ==
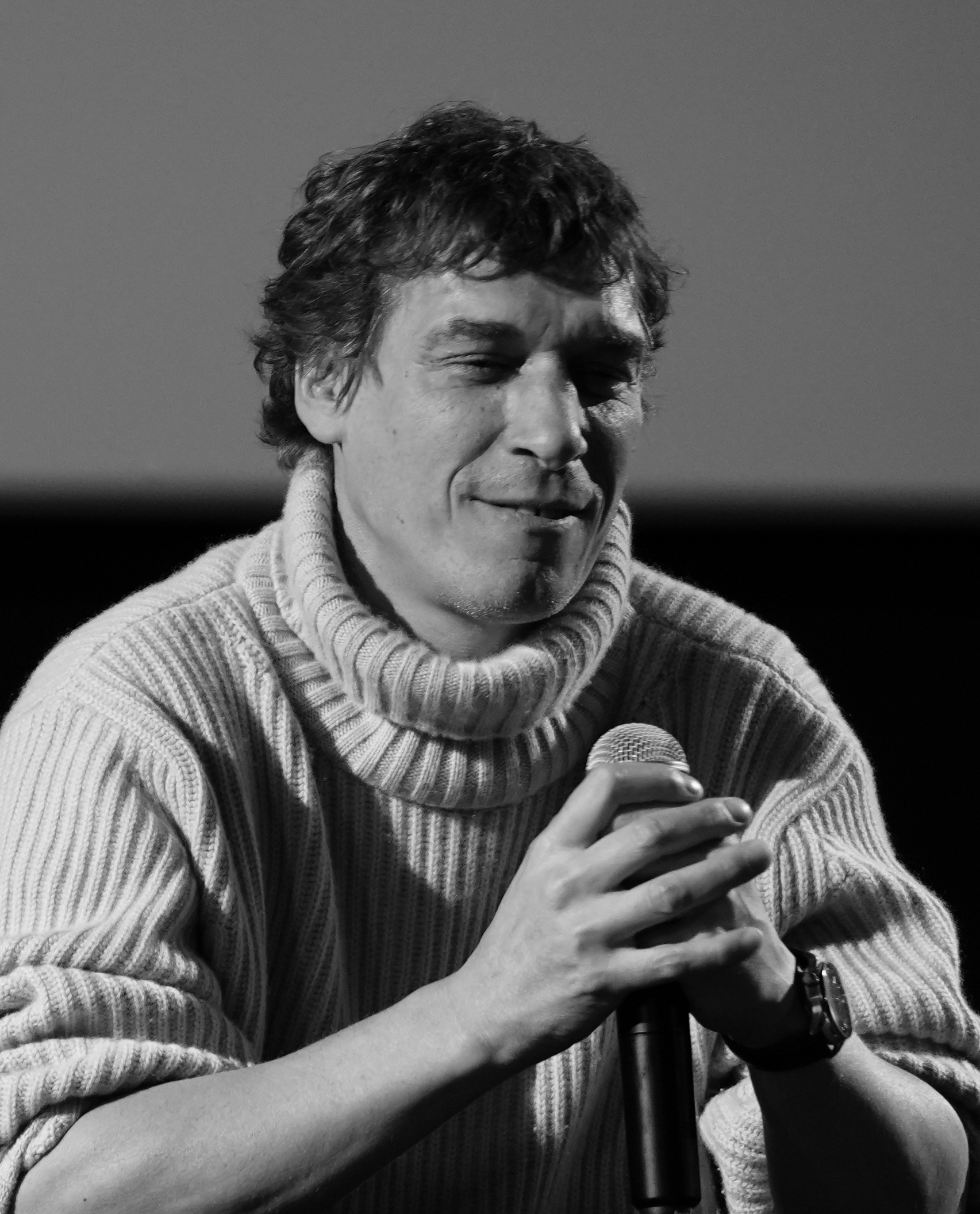
Jimenez in 2023

In 2001, Jimenez had a daughter with French actress Karole Rocher, his former partner.

Jimenez was also in a relationship with French filmmaker Audrey Diwan, with whom he had two children, born in 2007 and 2008, respectively. Jimenez and Diwan separated in 2018.

== Filmography ==
=== Feature films ===
Year	English title	Original title	Notes
2012	Paris Under Watch	Aux yeux de tous	Co-directed with Arnaud Duprey
2014	The Connection	La French	
2016	The Man with the Iron Heart	HHhH	English-language debut
2020	The Stronghold	BAC Nord	
2022	November	Novembre	
2025	Dog 51	Chien 51	
2027	Johnny		Post-production

=== Other credits ===
Year	Film	Credited as			Notes
Year	Film	Director	Screenwriter	Producer	Notes
2003	Who's the Boss: Boss of Scandalz Strategyz	Yes		Yes	Video documentary
2007	Scorpion		Yes	Yes	
2007	Eden Log			Yes	
2011	Bangkok Revenge			Yes	
