= Sheitan (film) =

- Theatrical release poster
- Directed by: Kim Chapiron
- Written by: Christian Chapiron; Kim Chapiron
- Produced by: Vincent Cassel; Kim Chapiron; Éric Névé
- Starring: Vincent Cassel; Olivier Barthélémy; Roxane Mesquida; Leïla Bekhti; Monica Bellucci
- Cinematography: Alex Lamarque
- Edited by: Benjamin Weill
- Music by: Nguyên Lê
- Production companies: 120 Films; La Chauve Souris; StudioCanal; Canal+ CinéCinéma; Wild Bunch; Région Ile-de-France
- Distributed by: Mars Distribution
- Release date: 1 February 2006
- Running time: 94 minutes
- Country: France
- Language: French
- Budget: $5.6 million
- Box office: $2.4 million

Sheitan ("Devil" in Arabic) is a 2006 French horror film directed by debutant director Kim Chapiron. It was written by Kim and Christian Chapiron. It stars and was co-produced by Vincent Cassel. His then-wife Monica Bellucci makes a cameo appearance in the film.

== Plot ==
A trio of friends partying at the club, Ladj, Bart, and Thaï, have decided to visit the country home of a woman they just met, Eve, after Bart is thrown out of the club. They take along with them another woman, Yasmine. Once in the country, they are introduced to the eccentric housekeeper Joseph, whose behaviors disturb Bart. He grows more irate after an incident in a nearby hot spring, where he is thrown in by Joseph's sexually aggressive niece. Later that night, Joseph tells them a story about a man who committed incest with his sister after being granted invulnerability by the devil. Upon discovering that she is pregnant, the devil tells the man that he must prepare a gift for the child. It is heavily implied by Joseph's mannerisms that he is telling a story about himself.

Throughout the day and night, Joseph collects various items from Bart's person such as hair from his head and scraps of fabric from his clothing. He brings the items to a pregnant woman, who uses them to decorate a doll. Joseph later assaults Bart and his friends after they are pranked by his niece and other youths from the local town. Ladj and Thaï flee the home for the city, leaving Bart behind after he protests that they are leaving Yasmine behind. Bart returns to the home to find Yasmine and is attacked by Joseph, who is carrying a curved dollmaking tool.

Just as his eyes are about to be carved out, Bart finds himself back at the club surrounded by Ladj, Thaï, and Yasmine at the moment where he was thrown out of the club. They take him to the hospital since he had been struck by a bottle prior to having been evicted, where Bart experiences strange imagery. He awakens on the country home's floor, his eyes having been carved out and placed on a puppet. Joseph then takes the puppet to the pregnant woman, Marie, who has given birth and is surrounded by Eve, Joseph's niece, and a young man that had swum with them in the hot spring. He shows the puppet to the baby before he and the woman turn to the camera and smile, showing that they have identical features and implying that they are brother and sister.

== Cast ==
- Vincent Cassel as Joseph/Marie
- Olivier Barthélémy as Bart
- Nico Le Phat Tan as Thaï
- Ladj Ly as Ladj
- Roxane Mesquida as Eve
- Leïla Bekhti as Yasmine
- Julie-Marie Parmentier as Jeanne
- François Levantal as The pumpman / surgeon

== Reception ==
The film holds a rating of 56% on review aggregator Rotten Tomatoes, based on 18 reviews, and an average rating of 5.4/10.
