= The 7 Lives of Lea =

French supernatural drama television series

- Release poster
- French: Les 7 vies de Léa
- Genre: Supernatural drama
- Created by: Charlotte Sanson
- Based on: Les 7 vies de Léo Belami by Nataël Trapp
- Written by: Déborah Hassoun; Dorothée Lachaud; Camille Rosset; Frédéric Rosset; Alice Vial
- Directed by: Julien Despaux; Émilie Noblet
- Starring: Raïka Hazanavicius; Khalil Ben Gharbia
- Composer: Jean-Benoît Dunckel
- Country of origin: France
- Original language: French
- No. of seasons: 1
- No. of episodes: 7

Production
- Producers: Eric Laroche; Raphaël Rocher
- Cinematography: Brecht Goyvaerts; Lucie Baudinaud
- Editor: Julien Perrin
- Running time: 45 minutes
- Production company: Empreinte Digitale

Original release
- Release: April 22, 2022

The 7 Lives of Lea (French: Les 7 vies de Léa) is a French supernatural drama television series created by Charlotte Sanson, adapted from the novel Les 7 Vies de Léo Belami by Nataël Trapp.

The show is distributed internationally by Netflix.

== Synopsis ==
In June 2021, while at an outdoor party by a river, teenage Léa stumbles upon skeletal remains. She wakes up the next day, thirty years in the past (to the day), inside the body of a young man named Ismaël. The following day, she awakes back in her own body and realizes it was Ismaël's body she found by the river. The process repeats each night for a total of seven days, with Léa inhabiting the body of six different people on seven consecutive days in June 1991, all of whom are in some way connected to Ismaël during the final week of his life. Léa tries to prevent Ismaël's death.

== Cast and characters ==
- Raïka Hazanavicius as Léa
- Khalil Ben Gharbia as Ismaël
- Marguerite Thiam Donnadieu as Karine (young)
- Maïra Schmitt as Romane
- Théo Fernandez as Stéphane (young)
- Rebecca Williams as Sandra
- Anne Azoulay as Patricia
- Alexander Ferrario as Pierre-Yves (young)
- Mélanie Doutey as Karine (adult)
- Samuel Benchetrit as Stéphane (adult)
- Anouar H. Smaine as Monsieur Ibrahim
