= Alphonse (TV series) =

2023 French television series

- Promotional poster
- Genre: Comedy drama
- Written by: Jean Dujardin; Nicolas Bedos
- Directed by: Nicolas Bedos
- Starring: Jean Dujardin; Charlotte Gainsbourg; Nicole Garcia; Pierre Arditi; Laura Morante; Francine Bergé; Marie-Christine Barrault
- Composer: Romain Trouillet
- Country of origin: France
- Original language: French
- No. of seasons: 1
- No. of episodes: 6

Production
- Producer: Alain Goldman
- Running time: 47 - 54 minutes
- Production companies: Banijay Entertainment; Montmartre Films

Original release
- Network: Amazon Prime Video
- Release: 12 October – 2 November 2023

Alphonse is a French television series written and directed by Nicolas Bedos. Produced by Alain Goldman under Banijay Entertainment and Montmartre Films, stars Jean Dujardin, Charlotte Gainsbourg, Nicole Garcia, Pierre Arditi, Laura Morante, Francine Bergé and Marie-Christine Barrault. The series premiered on Amazon Prime Video on October 12, 2023.

== Cast ==
- Jean Dujardin : Alphonse
- Charlotte Gainsbourg : Margot
- Nicole Garcia : Martha
- Elsa Zylberstein : Eleonore Baumann
- Pierre Arditi : Jacques Bisson
- Francine Bergé : Adele Clement
- Marie-Christine Barrault : Eve Bragnier
- Laura Morante : Laura Tomazi
- Martine Chevallier : Elise Duthi
- Vincent Macaigne : Wildred
- Myriem Akheddiou : The psy
- Lubna Azabal : Natacha Gemier
- Olivier Barthélémy : Bruno
- Nicole Calfan : Marianne
- Anne Canovas : Marie
- Michaël Cohen : Lucien Moreira
- Chantal Neuwirth : Francoise Berleau

== Production ==
The series was announced by Amazon Prime Video consisting of six episodes. The principal photography of the series began in 2022 and ended in 2023, with Jean Dujardin, Charlotte Gainsbourg, Nicole Garcia and Pierre Arditi joining the cast.

== Reception ==
In her review for A Good Movie To Watch, Renee Cuisia rated the series a 6.8 out of 10 stars. Shabnam Jahan gave the series a rating of two stars out of five in her review for Leisure Byte.
