= Paris Under Watch =

- Theatrical release poster
- French: Aux yeux de tous
- Directed by: Cédric Jimenez; Arnaud Duprey
- Written by: Audrey Diwan; Arnaud Duprey
- Starring: Olivier Barthélémy; Mélanie Doutey; Francis Renaud
- Cinematography: Léo Hinstin
- Edited by: Marie-Pierre Renaud; Nicolas Sarkissian
- Music by: Julien Jabre; Michael Tordjman
- Distributed by: DistriB Films
- Release date: 4 April 2012
- Running time: 80 minutes
- Country: France
- Language: French
- Budget: €1.5 million

Paris Under Watch (French: Aux yeux de tous; lit. 'In the eyes of all') is a 2012 French thriller film written by Audrey Diwan and Arnaud Duprey and directed by Cédric Jimenez and Duprey. The films stars Olivier Barthelemy, Mélanie Doutey and Francis Renaud.

The films follow a young anonymous hacker who discovers lost security camera footage of a recent terrorist attack at Gare d'Austerlitz in Paris. He decides to go after the culprit and discovers an unexpected plot.

== Plot ==
A bomb attack takes place at Gare d'Austerlitz in Paris, killing several people a few days before the presidential election. The police is suspecting an Al-Qaeda satellite-group, the security camera footage is lost. A hacker with an interest in security cameras gets hold of the lost footage. He decides to use his wide access to security cameras all over Paris to track down the culprits. In doing so, he discovers that the plot is bigger than expected.

== Cast ==
- Olivier Barthélémy as Sam Cortès
- Mélanie Doutey as Nora
- Francis Renaud as Otar Mirko
- Féodor Atkine as Nicola Mirko
- Valérie Sibilia as Marie
- Batiste De Oliveira as Anonymous_26 / Martin
- Pascal Henault as Tueur
- Xavier Magot as David

== Production ==
Paris Under Watch uses a fairly unusual approach by using only footage from security cameras and webcams for the video and phone recordings for the audio.
