= Kara Lynch =

American artist

Kara Lynch (often stylized as kara lynch) is an American artist who teaches at Hampshire College.

== Biography ==
Kara Lynch is a time-based artist born in 1968. Kara Lynch has an MFA in Visual Arts from the University of California, San Diego.

== Work ==
Lynch's art practice is "re-memory, vision, and movement." Lynch uses "low-fi, collective practice, and social intervention" to examine the aesthetic/political relationships between time and space. Lynch's practice is purposefully raced, classed, and gendered I.e. "Black, Queer and Feminist."

Lynch works in video and time-based media. Her projects include Black Russians, Mouhawala Oula, The Outing, and Xing Over. Lynch recorded her time working in Moscow through video and in "a series of handwritten books" during her artist's residency in 1994.

In 2015, she collaborated with Peggy Piesche on an installation called Deposits of future at the FAVT: Future Africa Visions in Time exhibition put on by the Bayreuth Academy of Advanced African Studies.

=== Invisible ===
Invisible is an ongoing project in audio installation, and one of Lynch's most notable projects. The project is an extended speculation, and an imagination of what if the transatlantic slave trade had not happened. The work is written about by Gascia Ouzounian in a 2008 dissertation.

Ouzounian writes of the project,

As a haunted work, it emerges in uncanny ways. Since 2001, the year she finished her landmark documentary Black Russians, Lynch has been working on Invisible, what she considers a "forever project." The forever-ness of Invisible is the forever-ness of memory and its infinite reflection in the lived environment. For Lynch, it is more precisely the forever-ness of the memory of slavery, a memory which is mapped out in Lynch's own lived environment in the United States in ways that she must continually process, negotiate, and re-reflect through this immense work.

"INVISIBLE :: saved," an installment of the Invisible project, was awarded a MAP Fund grant in 2018. This installment focuses on the lynching of Laura Nelson and her teenage son, and is described as "a living memorial" involving live choir performances taking place on steel bridges.

== Publications ==
Lynch is the co-editor of the anthology We Travel the SpaceWays: Black Imagination, Fragments and Diffractions. She has also contributed to the Ulbandus Review and Cabinet Magazine.

== Awards ==
Planet Out/ifilm Short Movie Award in 2000

New York Foundation for the Arts and New York State Council for the Arts Individual artist awards in video and new media
