= Mélanie Doutey =

French actress

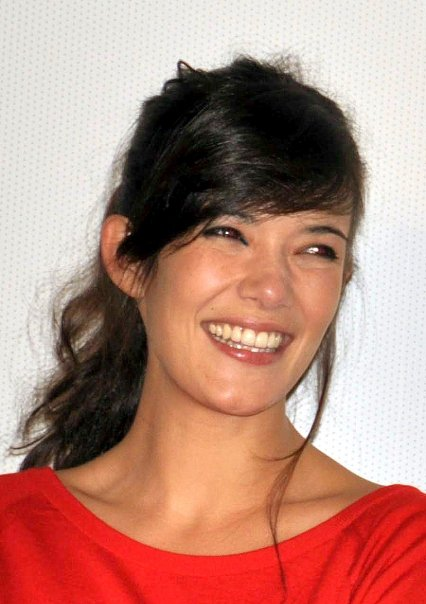
- Mélanie Doutey in 2009
- Born: Paris, France
- Occupation: Actress
- Years active: 1999–present

Mélanie Doutey is a French actress.

== Life and career ==
She is the daughter of filmmaker Alain Doutey and actress Arielle Séménoff. She appeared in Claude Chabrol's La Fleur du Mal and El Lobo, the true story of a mole within the Basque separatist group ETA. She also made a cameo in singer Calogero's video for En apesanteur.

In 2006, she was nominated for a César Award for Most Promising Actress for her performance in Il ne faut jurer de rien!, a cinematographic adaptation of an Alfred de Musset play.

Her scene with Jean Dujardin and Gilles Lellouche, directed by Jan Kounen was cut from the final version of The Players (2012), but later appeared on some DVD versions.

From 2002 to 2013, Doutey was in a relationship with actor Gilles Lellouche. They have a daughter named Ava, born on 5 September 2009.

As of October 2017, she was dating chef Cyril Lignac.

== Filmography ==
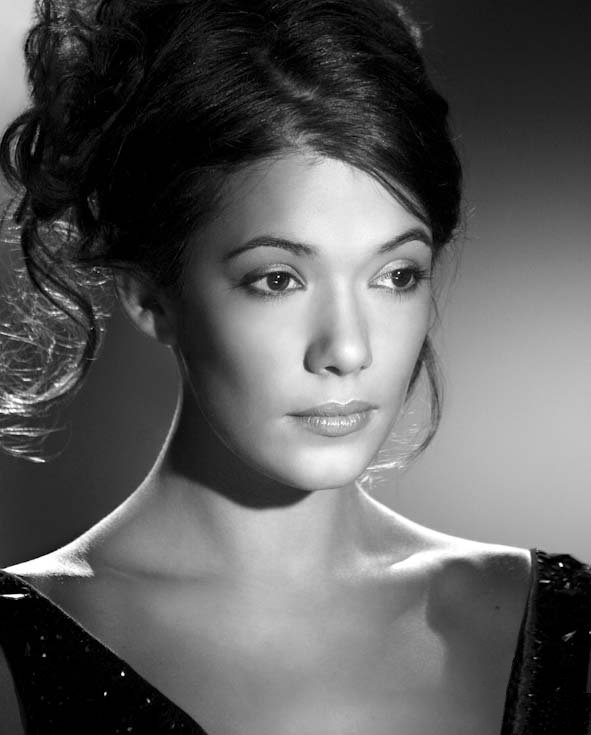
Doutey in 2008.

- Leïla (2001), Leïla
- Le frère du guerrier (2002), Guillemette
- Les 7 vies de Léa (2021), Charlotte Sanson
- La fleur du mal (2003), Michèle Charpin-Vasseur
- Narco (2004), Pupkin's hemineglect patient
- El Lobo (2004), Amaia
- Il ne faut jurer... de rien! (2005), Cécile
- Clara Sheller, Clara Sheller (6 episodes, 2005)
- Président (2006), Nahema
- Fair Play (2006), Béatrice
- On va s'aimer (2006), Camille
- Ce soir, je dors chez toi (2007), Laeticia
- Ma place au soleil (2007), Véronique
- Santa Closed (2007), Fille 2
- RTT (2008), Emilie Vergano
- Le bal des actrices (2009), Mélanie Doutey
- Une petite zone de turbulences (2009), Cathie Muret
- Aux yeux de tous (2012), Nora
- Jamais le premier soir (2014), Louise
- La French (2014), Christiane Zampa
- Entre amis (2015), Daphnée
- Paradise Beach (2019), Julia
- Inexorable (2021)
- Maldoror (2024)
