= Sink or Swim (2018 film) =

2018 film

- Film poster
- Directed by: Gilles Lellouche
- Written by: Ahmed Hamidi; Julien Lambroschini; Gilles Lellouche
- Produced by: Alain Attal; Hugo Sélignac; Chi-Fou-Mi Productions
- Starring: Guillaume Canet; Virginie Efira; Mathieu Amalric; Leïla Bekhti; Benoît Poelvoorde; Jean-Hugues Anglade; Marina Foïs; Philippe Katerine
- Cinematography: Laurent Tangy
- Edited by: Simon Jacquet
- Music by: Jon Brion
- Distributed by: StudioCanal (France)
- Release dates: 13 May 2018 (Cannes); 24 October 2018 (France)
- Running time: 122 minutes
- Country: France
- Language: French
- Budget: $21.8 million
- Box office: $39.2 million

Sink or Swim (French: Le Grand Bain) is a 2018 French comedy drama film directed by Gilles Lellouche. It was screened out of competition at the 2018 Cannes Film Festival.

== Cast ==
- Guillaume Canet as Laurent
- Virginie Efira as Delphine
- Mathieu Amalric as Bertrand
- Leïla Bekhti as Amanda
- Benoît Poelvoorde as Marcus
- Jean-Hugues Anglade as Simon
- Marina Foïs as Claire
- Jonathan Zaccaï as Thibault
- Philippe Katerine as Thierry
- Noée Abita as Lola

== See also ==
- Allt flyter, a similar film from 2008
- Swimming with Men, a similar film from 2018
