= Olivier Barthélémy =

French actor

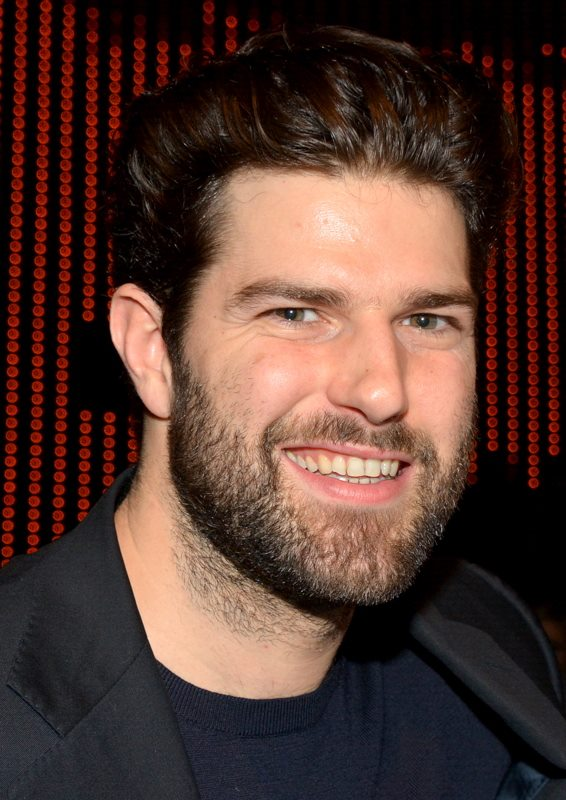
- Olivier Barthélémy at the film premiere of Discount in 2015
- Born: Olivier Barthélémy; 29 October 1979 (age 46); Munich, Germany
- Citizenship: France
- Occupation: Actor
- Years active: 1996–present

Olivier Barthélémy (born 29 October 1979 in Munich, Germany) is a French actor. Notable titles are Sheitan (2006), Largo Winch II (2011) and Discount (2014).

== Filmography ==
=== Films ===
- 2005 – Sheitan as Bart
- 2005 – Paris Lockdown as The Chauffeur
- 2005 – Pom the Colt as The Secouriste
- 2007 – Public Enemy Number One as an escaped prisoner
- 2010 – Largo Winch II as Simon Ovronnaz
- 2010 – Mike as Fred
- 2010 – Our Day Will Come as Rémy
- 2012 – Paris Under Watch as Sam
- 2012 – What the Day Owes the Night as Jean-Christophe
- 2014 – 24 Days as Jérôme Ribeiro
- 2014 – Discount as Gilles
- 2017 – That's All For Me as Rayan
- 2018 – Team Spirit as Pippo
- 2020 – Children of Heart
- 2020 – Life Is a Big Scam
- 2021 – Mastemah as Théo Liblis
- 2022 – Overdose as Victor Piquemal
- 2023 – Win or die as Pfeiffer
- 2023 – Chain reaction as Derval
- 2023 – The Most Beautiful To Be Dancing as M. Bonnot
- 2023 – Guardians of the Formula as Derval

=== Short films ===
- 1996 – Psykonegros
- 1998 – Paris by Night
- 1998 -Pret a tout pour rien du tout
- 2002 -Easy Pizza Riderz
- 2002 – Les Frères Wanted 2 : La barbichette as Barth
- 2003 – Les Frères Wanted 3 : Le Chat de la Grand-mère d'Abdelkrim as Barth
- 2003 – Desirs Dans L'Espace
- 2004 – La Banana
- 2008 – Go Fast Connexion
- 2009 – MILO de Matthieu Serveau as Pascal
- 2011 – L'Intruse de Maxime Giffard
- 2015 as J'ai dix ans
- 2018 – Crocs as Ian
- 2021 – Alban

=== Television ===
- 2006 – Long live the bomb! as Fred
- 2006 – Paris, criminal investigations (1 episode) as Piotr
- 2007 – The Commune (7 episodes) Denis Moreau
- 2011 – Bankable as Nicolas Ricci
- 2017 – I Have Two Loves as Jérémie
- 2018 – The Great
- 2018 – The Last Wave as Pierre Mattéoli
- 2019 – 100% Bio as Peio
- 2021 – Sophie Cross as Joseph Montoya
- 2022 – Alphonse
- 2022 – Pax Massilia
