= BAC Nord =

2021 French film directed by Cédric Jimenez

- Official release poster
- Directed by: Cédric Jimenez
- Screenplay by: Cédric Jimenez; Audrey Diwan
- Produced by: Hugo Sélignac; Vincent Mazel
- Starring: Gilles Lellouche; François Civil; Karim Leklou; Adèle Exarchopoulos; Kenza Fortas
- Cinematography: Laurent Tangy
- Edited by: Simon Jacquet
- Music by: Guillaume Roussel
- Production companies: Chi-Fou-Mi Productions; France 2 Cinéma; StudioCanal
- Distributed by: StudioCanal
- Release dates: 12 July 2021 (Cannes Film Festival); 18 August 2021 (France)
- Running time: 104 minutes
- Country: France
- Language: French
- Budget: $14 million
- Box office: $18 million

BAC Nord (internationally titled The Stronghold) is a 2021 French action thriller film co-written and directed by Cédric Jimenez from a screenplay by Jimenez and Audrey Diwan, starring Gilles Lellouche, François Civil, Karim Leklou, Adèle Exarchopoulos, and Kenza Fortas. The film made its world premiere at the 2021 Cannes Film Festival out of competition on 12 July 2021. StudioCanal released the film theatrically in France on 18 August 2021. The film received seven nominations for the 47th César Awards, including Best Film, Best Director, Best Actor and Best Supporting Actor.

The plot is based on a scandal that took place in 2012 within the anti-crime brigade (French: fr:brigade anticriminalité, BAC) of Marseille where eighteen members were indicted for drug trafficking and racketeering.

== Synopsis ==
In 2012 in Marseille, one of the cities with the highest crime rates in France, three Marseille cops, Grég Cerva (Gilles Lellouche), Antoine (François Civil), and Yass (Karim Leklou) hustle day and night to catch drug peddlers. Greg wants to bust the distribution center in the northern neighborhoods of the city. However, the area is a well-protected stronghold run by kingpins who will kill anyone to protect their turf.

Greg demands a strong police brigade to seize the ghetto, but his senior, Jérôme Bodin, has a chain of command to follow. Every time Greg picks up fights in the northern neighborhood while catching criminals, he is humiliated because the police can’t use their equipment without authority.

However, the opportunity strikes when kidnappers from the ghetto upload a video assaulting a person. The video catches media attention. Jérôme hands over the case to Greg and gives him the power to enter the ghetto and make arrests.

Greg makes a team with Antoine and Yass. They start gathering intel to bust the distribution center. Antoine’s constant informant, Amel, demands 5 kg of hash to share the information. However, Jérôme refuses to give him drugs from the police vault. The team is on their own, but Greg finds a way to arrange the consignment.

Greg and his team stole drugs from the customers while patrolling. Antoine weighed and stored the substance in his house, and when they reached the threshold, he handed over the consignment to Amel. She informed Antoine about a big shipment coming to the ghetto, and it could be their moment to seize the distribution network. The police brigade infiltrated the ghetto, and after a tough hustle, they finally accomplished their operation.

Two months later, IGPN (The General Inspectorate of the National Police) arrested Greg, Antoine, and Yass. They raided their houses and found traces of hash in Antoine’s abode. Lieutenant Yvon interrogated the cops and informed them about racketeering and drug trafficking charges against them. Greg explained to Yvon they confiscated drugs to pay the informant in exchange for the intel. However, when Yvon asked Antoine about the informer’s identity, he refused to snitch on Amel.

Greg revealed that his senior Jérôme knew about the operation. However, when the judge inquired the same, Jérôme backed off and lied to protect the rest of the unit. No one was ready to take the blame, and Greg and his team were in a fix.

The trio were sentenced to provisional detention and were put in solitary confinement until the investigation was over. In detention, Greg crazily requested the guard to let him talk to Jérôme. He even assaulted the guard after losing his sanity. Yass’ wife, Nora, requested other police officers involved to admit they also paid informants with drugs. But they had family themselves and would simply be put in jail as well.

Yass begged Antoine to disclose the informant’s identity, or they would lose their friend, Greg, as he was losing his mental sanity. Unwillingly, Antoine contacted Lieutenant Yvon and told the department about Amel and her whereabouts. The police arrested Amel, and after confirming the existence of the informant, the prosecutor decided to drop the charges of organized drug trafficking. The judge ended their provisional detention, and the trio was released.

In the end, Yass joined the Police Union, where he defends his colleagues and their rapports against the management. Antoine turned his badge in and started working as a prison nurse, looking after the inmates. While Greg Cerva was removed from the force, he became a municipal officer to support his livelihood.

== Cast ==
- Gilles Lellouche as Grégory Cerva
- Karim Leklou as Yassine
- François Civil as Antoine
- Adèle Exarchopoulos as Nora
- Kenza Fortas as Amel
- Cyril Lecomte as Jérôme
- Michaël Abiteboul as Jacques
- Idir Azougli as Kevin
- Jean-Yves Berteloot as Yvon
- Kofs as TMAX man in Castellane

== Music ==
All music is composed by Guillaume Roussel.

BAC Nord (Original Motion Picture Soundtrack)
| No. | Title | Length |
|---|---|---|
| 1. | "Greg" | 4:36 |
| 2. | "The Stronghold" | 2:33 |
| 3. | "From Light to Shadow" | 1:44 |
| 4. | "Released" | 2:11 |
| 5. | "The Calm Before The Storm" | 1:59 |
| 6. | "Balance" | 2:09 |
| 7. | "Political Discourse" | 1:51 |
| 8. | "Bac Nord" | 1:08 |
| Total length: | | 18:14 |

== Promotion and release ==
The film was scheduled for release at the end of 2020, with the release date originally set for 25 November, then shifted by one month to 23 December. The film's first teaser came out on 18 September 2020. On 3 December 2020, a new trailer was unveiled by the distributor. But, as the health situation (due to the COVID-19 pandemic) did not improve, the cinemas could not reopen and the film's release was postponed to 18 August 2021, as announced by StudioCanal.

The film made its world premiere at the 2021 Cannes Film Festival out of competition on 12 July 2021, where it earned a 7-minute standing ovation at the end of its screening.

== Controversy ==
During the press conference following the film's screening at the festival, Irish journalist Fiachra Gibbons of AFP criticized the film for its vision of the cities, accused the film of "taking sides in favor of the police against the inhabitants", and said that the film could encourage spectators "to vote for Marine Le Pen in the next presidential election". The director replied saying he believed on the contrary, that he made "a balanced film, a fiction but where everything is not invented, which does not present the police officers as angels but recalls the complexity of their work".

== Reception ==
List of reviews
| Periodic | Note |
|---|---|
| 20 minutes | 5 stars |
| France Info | 4/5 stars |
| Le Journal du Dimanche | 4/5 stars |
| Le Nouvel Observateur | 4/5 stars |
| Les Echos | 4/5 stars |
| Marianne | 3/5 stars |
| La Voix du Nord | 3/5 stars |
| L'Humanité | 3/5 stars |
| Le Monde | 2/5 stars |
| Les Inrockuptibles | 2/5 stars |
| Libération | 1/5 stars |

In France, the site AlloCiné gave the movie an average rating of 3.6 out of 5, based on a survey of 34 French reviews.

The daily newspaper 20 Minutes considered that the film “an excellent detective film that gives you great anxiety. It offers virtuoso sequences like a siege scene of rare intensity”. France Info described the film as "nervous and tense like few French thrillers since its rarefaction in the cinema". Le Journal du Dimanche recognizes a “terribly effective urban western [...] and great moments of spectacular cinema such as we rarely see in France with a trio of talented actors giving flesh to borderline characters". Les Echos regrets the scenario "who takes sides for the innocence of the defendants even before the verdict of the court" but recognizes that "from this reality, the film nevertheless draws its qualities. “BAC Nord” is a thriller in reinforced concrete, woven with humanity”.

The weekly Marianne considered that the film is "realistic and devoid of clichés as much in its representation of the cops as in that of the thugs, the film strikes by its dryness, its darkness, its scriptwriting and formal mastery", while acknowledging that the director “knows what he is talking about and what he is portraying in this harsh and devoid of complacency in which he examines the “codes" of cops and delinquents, sometimes strangely similar”. The daily La Voix du Nord described the film as a “shocking and spectacular thriller which does not always convince in its societal approach”.

L'Humanité called it a film "compliant with the police, the film - as effective as it is - remains politically problematic". According to Marsactu, the film “takes a real distance from the facts, even if it means espousing the police version”. Le Monde stated it is a “rehabilitation that is not only difficult to swallow, but rather unwelcome”. The monthly Les Inrockuptibles said the film remains “a detective fiction neither pro-cop nor anti-cop but caricature”. The daily newspaper Libération wrote that the film is "a trend of fifty shades of right against a background of false Marseille accent, the demagogue and virilist film of Cédric Jimenez is failed as much in its execution as in its intentions."

In Cahiers du Cinéma, Marcos Uzal wrote in his editorial - entitled “Bac Nord: the truth if you lie” - that the film “is taken to the right as an emblem of truth for its representation of the police and the cities” and that "he ignores any ethical point of view." He underlined that with regard to the real history from which Bac Nord is inspired "far from the reality of the facts, this complex affair is here reduced to a story of a loot to be collected to pay an informer".

BAC Nord has an approval rating of 50% on review aggregator website Rotten Tomatoes, based on 6 reviews, and an average rating of 4.8/10.

=== Box office ===
Before its official release, the film sold 35,663 tickets in premieres throughout France, and more 72,498 tickets sold on 18 August 2021 (national release date) out of 585 theaters, debuting at number one with a total of 108,161 admissions. The film thus achieved the best start of the novelties of the week, ahead of The Boss Baby: Family Business. After a week in theaters, BAC Nord confirmed its status leading with 483,381 admissions, thus achieving the third best start for a French film since the reopening, behind Kaamelott: The First Chapter and OSS 117: From Africa with Love.

For its second week in theaters, the film remained at the top of the box office by accumulating 414,170 additional admissions. The film surpassed the symbolic million admissions mark in its third week in theaters, but lost its leadership following the release of Shang-Chi and the Legend of the Ten Rings. The film sold a total of 2,2 million tickets in France and grossed $18 million at the box office worldwide.

Abroad, the film did not benefit from a theatrical release, having been acquired by Netflix for exclusive streaming on its platform under the international title The Stronghold. According to figures communicated by the platform, BAC Nord was, in the week of its release, the third most watched non-English language film on Netflix in the world (in hours seen) behind À en soulever des montagnes and Comme des proies.

=== Awards and nominations ===
| Year | Award | Category | Recipient(s) | Result | Ref. |
|---|---|---|---|---|---|
| 2022 | 47th César Awards | Best Film | Hugo Sélignac, Vincent Mazel | Nominated | |
| 2022 | 47th César Awards | Best Director | Cédric Jimenez | Nominated | |
| 2022 | 47th César Awards | Best Actor | Gilles Lellouche | Nominated | |
| 2022 | 47th César Awards | Best Supporting Actor | François Civil | Nominated | |
| 2022 | 47th César Awards | Best Supporting Actor | Karim Leklou | Nominated | |
| 2022 | 47th César Awards | Best Editing | Simon Jacquet | Nominated | |
| 2022 | 47th César Awards | Best Original Music | Guillaume Roussel | Nominated | |
