= Adèle Exarchopoulos =

French actress (born 1993)

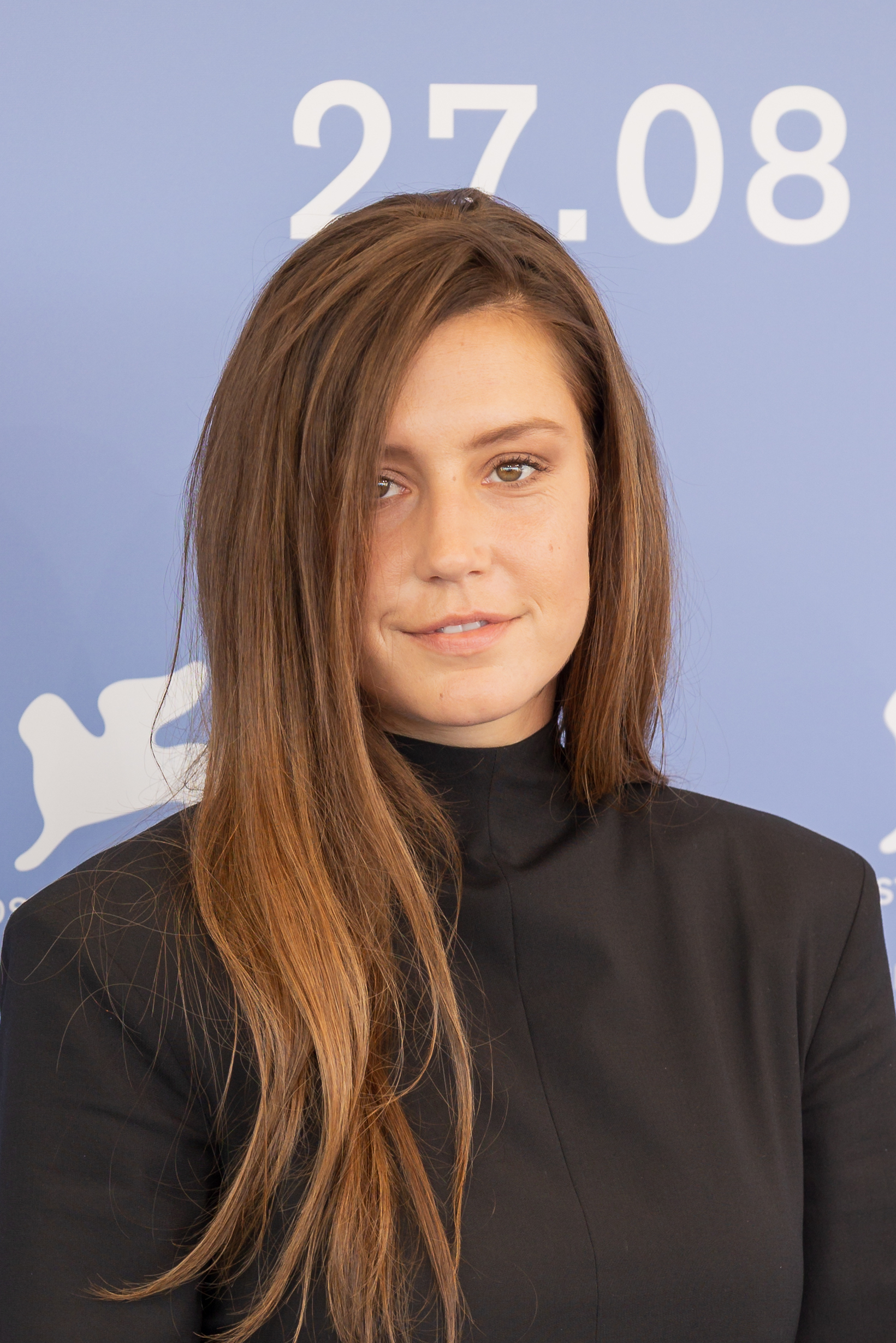
- Exarchopoulos in 2025
- Born: 22 November 1993 (age 32); Paris, France
- Occupation: Actress
- Years active: 2006–present
- Children: 1

Adèle Exarchopoulos (French: [adɛl ɛɡzaʁkɔpulɔs]; born 22 November 1993) is a French actress. She had her career breakthrough starring as Adèle in the romance Blue Is the Warmest Colour (La Vie d'Adèle, 2013); at the 2013 Cannes Film Festival, she became the youngest person in the history of the festival to be awarded the Palme d'Or. She won it with her co-star Léa Seydoux.

Exarchopoulos won two César Awards for Blue is the Warmest Colour (2013) and All Your Faces (2023). She was also nominated for Cesars for her roles in Mandibles (2020) and Zero Fucks Given (2023). Her other notables roles feature her in such films as Racer and the Jailbird (2017), The White Crow (2018), Sibyl (2019), The Five Devils (2022), and Passages (2023). She voiced Ennui in the Pixar animated film Inside Out 2 (2024).

== Early life ==
Exarchopoulos grew up in the 19th arrondissement of Paris, near the Place des Fêtes. Her mother is a French nurse. Her father is a French restaurant manager at the Palais omnisports de Paris-Bercy, film producer, and president of the company 1660 Productions. She is of Greek ancestry through her paternal great-grandfather, who was born there.

== Career ==
=== 2006–2012: Acting debut and early roles ===
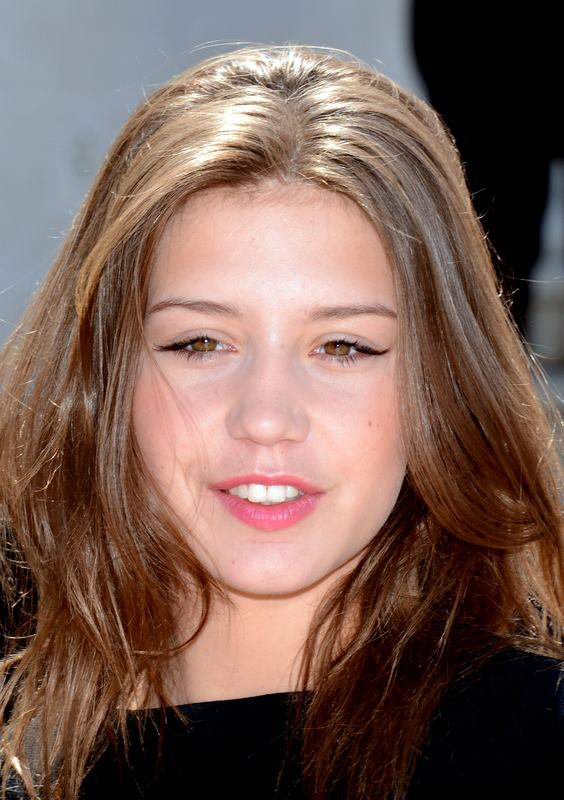
Exarchopoulos at the 2013 Cannes Film Festival

In 2006, Exarchopoulos was spotted by an agent and made her first television appearance in an episode of the French police series R.I.S, police scientifique. At thirteen, she had a debuting film role in the 2007 film Boxes. She also appeared in the films Les Enfants de Timpelbach (2008), The Round Up (2010), Turk's Head (2010), Chez Gino (2011), Carré blanc (2011), Pieces of Me (2012), and I Used to Be Darker (2013).

=== 2013–2019: Breakthrough and acclaim ===
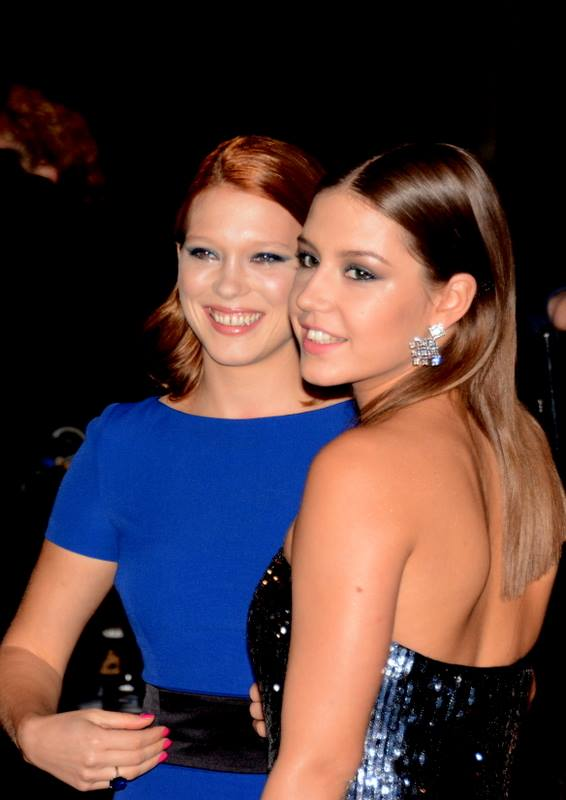
Exarchopoulos at the 39th César Awards with her Blue Is the Warmest Colour co-star Léa Seydoux

She attracted international attention and critical acclaim for her performance in Blue Is the Warmest Colour, a 2013 film based on the 2010 French graphic novel of the same name. The film won the Palme d'Or at the 2013 Cannes Film Festival. Exarchopoulos and co-star Léa Seydoux were awarded the Palme d'Or alongside director Abdellatif Kechiche, becoming the only women apart from director Jane Campion to have won the award at the time; Exarchopoulos is the youngest person to ever receive the award. For her performance in Blue Is the Warmest Colour, she won the Los Angeles Film Critics Association Award for Best Actress, the César Award for Most Promising Actress, and the Trophée Chopard for Female Revelation of the Year, among dozens of other accolades. She received critical praise and her performance was cited as one of the year's best. Indiewire critic Eric Kohn stated that her performance was the best female performance of 2013. Her performance was praised for its "rawness." Critic A.O. Scott of The New York Times wrote that she gives a performance with "astonishing sensitivity" adding "Ms. Exarchopoulos almost never departs from the camera's scrutiny, and her reality, her ways of seeing and feeling, define the many shades of Blue." Justin Chang of Variety declared, "The picture belongs to Exarchopoulos, completely inhabiting a role aptly named after the thesp herself; with her husky voice and sweet, reluctant smile, she plays virtually every emotion a director can demand of an actress, commanding the viewer's attention and sympathy at every minute". Exarchopoulos discussed her process with The New York Times, explaining: "Abdellatif tried to keep us close to reality. He asked us to play with our own emotions. For example, I kept my own voice. It's very subtle, very delicate, the things that are a part of you and the things that are a part of your character".

She portrayed Judith, an aspiring teacher in the period drama film Les Anarchistes. The film premiered at the 2015 Cannes Film Festival where Guy Lodge of Variety praised her chemistry with Tahar Rahim while also describing her performance as "attentive [and] quietly expressive." She then appeared in The Last Face alongside Javier Bardem and Charlize Theron, directed by Sean Penn, which premiered in competition for the Palme d'Or at the 2016 Cannes Film Festival. That same year she acted in the Arnaud des Pallières directed French drama Orphan opposite Adèle Haenel. The film premiered at the 2016 Toronto International Film Festival.

The following year she acted opposite Matthias Schoenaerts in the drama Racer and the Jailbird (2017), a film by Belgian film director Michaël R. Roskam. A.A. Dowd of The A.V. Club wrote, "[the film] taps into her magnetism: an underutilized fusion of glamour and ordinariness, holding the center of a film that feigns interest in character and story, when it's really all about the superficial pleasures". In 2018 she portrayed socialite Clara Saint opposite Oleg Ivenko as the ballet dancer Rudolf Nureyev in the biographical drama The White Crow directed by Ralph Fiennes. In 2019 she starred in the Justine Triet directed comedy-drama Sibyl alongside Virginie Efira. The film premiered at the 2019 Cannes Film Festival where it competed for the Palme d'Or. In the film she portrays a movie actress having an affair with her costar.

=== 2020–present ===
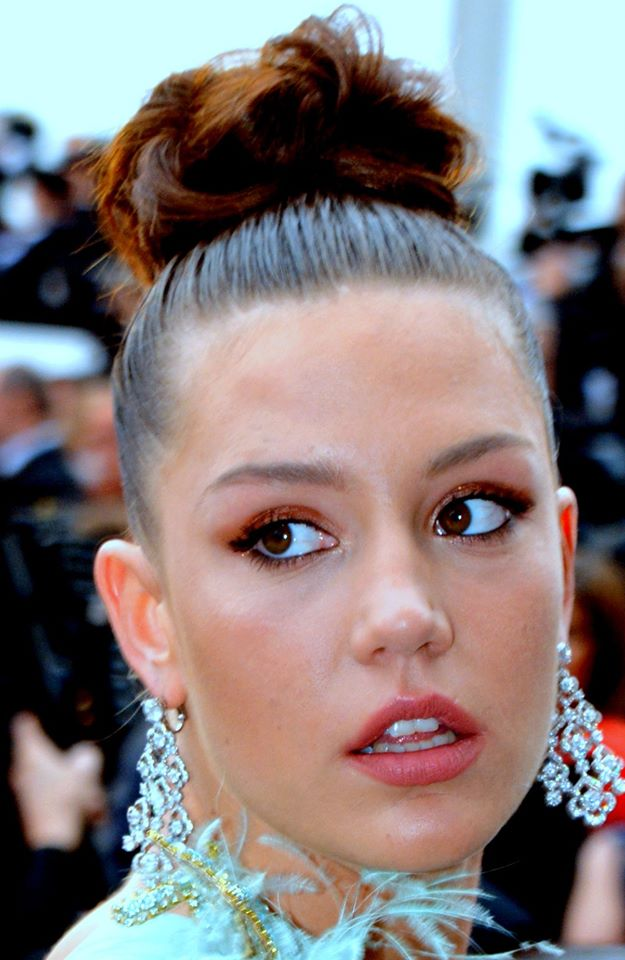
Exarchopoulos in 2019

In 2020 she starred in the comedy Mandibles directed by Quentin Dupieux. In an interview with iO Donna she stated her role was inspired by Greta Thunberg. The film premiered at the 77th Venice International Film Festival with The Hollywood Reporter describing her performance as being "both deadpan and cartoonishly over-the-top, like Tex Avery by way of David Lynch." She went on to earn a nomination for the César Award for Best Supporting Actress. The next year she starred in the comedy-drama Zero Fucks Given (2021) playing a young woman who recently lost her job as a flight attendant. The film screened in the Critics' Week section at the 74th Cannes Film Festival where it received critical acclaim. Jordan Mintzer of The Hollywood Reporter wrote of her performance, "[the film] remains engrossing because of how committed Exarchopoulos is to the role." She was nominated for the César Award for Best Actress. She then starred in the fantasy drama The Five Devils directed by Léa Mysius which had its world premiere in the Directors' Fortnight section of the 2022 Cannes Film Festival. Sophie Butcher of Empire described her as being "extraordinary" adding, "Her performance is one of taut physicality, balancing aloofness and vulnerability, and taps into more primal places".

In 2023, she acted in the Ira Sachs romance Passages opposite Franz Rogowski and Ben Whishaw. Sachs described her as a cross between Jeanne Moreau and Brigitte Bardot. Rex Reed of Observer declared, "Dominated by three sensational performances, Passages invites obvious comparisons to Sunday Bloody Sunday, John Schlesinger's brilliant 1971 film about the devastating effects of a ménage à trois on an otherwise conventional heterosexual marriage". Film critic Kambole Campbell of Empire wrote, "Exarchopoulos imbues her character with conflicting senses of excitement and cautiousness". That same year she acted in the French drama All Your Faces directed by Jeanne Herry. For her performance she won the César Award for Best Supporting Actress. In 2024, she voiced Ennui in the Pixar animated film Inside Out 2. David Ehrlich of IndieWire wrote, "[Ennui] is voiced by a very amusing, very French Adèle Exarchopoulos, and is so blasé about everything that she operates the console from her phone on the couch".

== Personal life ==
Exarchopoulos and actor Jérémie Laheurte began dating in 2012 during the filming of Blue Is the Warmest Colour, but they ended their relationship in 2015. In 2016, she began a relationship with French rapper Mamadou Coulibaly, known as Doums, member of French hip hop collective group L'entourage, with whom she had a son, born in 2017. They separated in 2017. Since 2023, she has been dating her BAC Nord and Beating Hearts co-star, François Civil.

In November 2020, after Blue Is the Warmest Colour director Abdellatif Kechiche was accused of sexual assault by an unnamed 29-year-old actress, Exarchopoulos spoke about her relationship with the director in an interview with French Elle magazine: "He's someone I'll love all my life. I think of him often, I hope he is happy. My meeting with him was decisive in my desire to make cinema. Certainly, Abdellatif is a complex being. But it upsets me because I really know him." In a July 2023 interview with the Los Angeles Times, Exarchopoulos said that she is still close to Kechiche. Exarchopoulos also thanked Kechiche during her speech at the 49th César Awards on 23 February 2024.

In June 2024, Exarchopoulos signed a petition addressed to French President Emmanuel Macron demanding that France officially recognize the State of Palestine.

== Filmography ==
=== Film ===
Film roles
Year	Title	Role	Notes
2007	Boxes	Lilli	
2008	Trouble at Timpetill	Marianne	
2010	The Round Up	Anna Traube	
2010	Turk's Head	Nina	
2011	Chez Gino	Maria Roma	
2011	Carré blanc	Marie (young)	
2012	Pieces of Me	Erell	
2013	Making a Scene	The Woman	Short film
2013	I Used to Be Darker	Camille	
2013	Blue Is the Warmest Colour	Adèle	
2014	Insecure	Jenny	
2014	Voyage vers la mère	Marie Louise	
2015	Les Anarchistes	Judith Lorillard	
2015	Apnée	The Woman	Short film
2016	Down by Love	Anna Amari	
2016	The Last Face	Ellen	
2016	Orphan	Sandra	
2017	Racer and the Jailbird	Bibi Delhany	
2018	The White Crow	Clara Saint	
2019	Sibyl	Margot Vasilis	
2019	Back Home	Mona	
2020	Mandibles	Agnès	
2021	Zero Fucks Given	Cassandre Wassels	
2021	BAC Nord	Nora	
2022	The Five Devils	Joanne Soler	
2022	Smoking Causes Coughing	Céline	
2023	Elemental	Ember Lumen (voice)	French dub
2023	Passages	Agathe	
2023	All Your Faces	Chloé Delarme	
2023	The Animal Kingdom	Julia Izquierdo	
2023	A Real Job	Meriem Bayan	
2023	Wingwomen	Alex	
2023	All-Time High	Herself	Cameo
2024	Beating Hearts	Jackie	
2024	Inside Out 2	Ennui (voice)	English and French dub
2024	Planet B	Julia Bombarth	
2025	The Piano Accident	Magalie Moreau	
2025	Chien 51	Salia Malberg	
2026	Another Day	Garance	
2026	Orange-Flavoured Wedding	Claudie	

=== Television ===
Television roles
Year	Title	Role	Notes
2006	R.I.S, police scientifique	Sarah	1 episode
2020	La Flamme	Soraya	Main role (7 episodes)
2022	Le Flambeau, les aventuriers de Chupacabra	Soraya	Main role (6 episodes)
2023	LOL: Qui rit, sort!	Herself	7 episodes
2025	Too Much	Polly	4 episodes

=== Theatre ===
Theatre roles
Year	Title	Director	Venue	Ref.
2019	La Trilogie de la vengeance	Simon Stone	Odéon-Théâtre de l'Europe	

== Awards and nominations ==
Award	Year	Category	Work	Result	Ref.
Cannes Film Festival	2013	Palme d'Or (shared with Léa Seydoux and Abdellatif Kechiche)	Blue Is the Warmest Colour	Won	
Chicago Film Critics Association	2013	Best Actress	Blue Is the Warmest Colour	Nominated	
Chicago Film Critics Association	2013	Most Promising Performer	Blue Is the Warmest Colour	Won	
Detroit Film Critics Society	2013	Best Actress	Blue Is the Warmest Colour	Nominated	
Dublin Film Critics' Circle	2013	Best Actress	Blue Is the Warmest Colour	Runner-up	
Dublin Film Critics' Circle	2013	Best Newcomer	Blue Is the Warmest Colour	Won	
Indiana Film Journalists Association	2013	Best Actress	Blue Is the Warmest Colour	Won	
IndieWire Critics Poll	2013	Best Lead Performance	Blue Is the Warmest Colour	Runner-up	
Los Angeles Film Critics Association	2013	Best Actress	Blue Is the Warmest Colour	Won	
National Board of Review	2013	Best Breakthrough Actress	Blue Is the Warmest Colour	Won	
New York Film Critics Circle	2013	Best Actress	Blue Is the Warmest Colour	Runner-up	
New York Film Critics Online	2013	Best Breakthrough Performance	Blue Is the Warmest Colour	Won	
Online Film Critics Society	2013	Best Actress	Blue Is the Warmest Colour	Nominated	
San Diego Film Critics Society	2013	Best Actress	Blue Is the Warmest Colour	Nominated	
San Francisco Bay Area Film Critics Circle	2013	Best Actress	Blue Is the Warmest Colour	Nominated	
Utah Film Critics Association	2013	Best Actress	Blue Is the Warmest Colour	Won	
Village Voice Film Poll	2013	Best Actress	Blue Is the Warmest Colour	Won	
Washington D.C. Area Film Critics Association	2013	Best Youth Performance	Blue Is the Warmest Colour	Nominated	
Central Ohio Film Critics Association	2014	Best Actress	Blue Is the Warmest Colour	Won	
Central Ohio Film Critics Association	2014	Breakthrough Film Artist	Blue Is the Warmest Colour	Won	
César Awards	2014	César Award for Most Promising Actress	Blue Is the Warmest Colour	Won	
Lumière Awards	2014	Best Female Revelation	Blue Is the Warmest Colour	Won	
Critics' Choice Movie Awards	2014	Best Young Actor/Actress	Blue Is the Warmest Colour	Won	
Dorian Awards	2014	Best Actress	Blue Is the Warmest Colour	Nominated	
Dorian Awards	2014	Rising Star of the Year	Blue Is the Warmest Colour	Nominated	
Empire Awards	2014	Best Female Newcomer	Blue Is the Warmest Colour	Nominated	
International Cinephile Society	2014	Best Actress	Blue Is the Warmest Colour	Won	
London Film Critics' Circle	2014	Actress of the Year	Blue Is the Warmest Colour	Nominated	
National Society of Film Critics	2014	Best Actress	Blue Is the Warmest Colour	Runner-up	
North Carolina Film Critics Association	2014	Best Actress	Blue Is the Warmest Colour	Nominated	
Online Film and Television Association	2014	Best Actress	Blue Is the Warmest Colour	Nominated	
Online Film and Television Association	2014	Best Youth Performance	Blue Is the Warmest Colour	Won	
Online Film and Television Association	2014	Best Female Breakthrough	Blue Is the Warmest Colour	Nominated	
Satellite Awards	2014	Best Actress in a Motion Picture	Blue Is the Warmest Colour	Nominated	
Santa Barbara International Film Festival	2014	Virtuosos Award	Blue Is the Warmest Colour	Honored	
Cannes Film Festival	2014	Trophée Chopard	—N/a	Won	
Ensor Awards	2018	Best Actress	Racer and the Jailbird	Nominated	
César Awards	2022	Best Supporting Actress	Mandibles	Nominated	
César Awards	2023	Best Actress	Zero Fucks Given	Nominated	
César Awards	2024	Best Supporting Actress	All Your Faces	Won	
Dublin Film Critics' Circle	2023	Best Actress	Passages	Nominated	
Chlotrudis Society for Independent Films	2024	Best Performance in a Supporting Role	Passages	Nominated	
César Awards	2025	Best Actress	Beating Hearts	Nominated	
