= Paola Locatelli =

French influencer, model and actress

- Paola Locatelli at the 2026 Cannes Film Festival
- Born: Thionville, Moselle, France
- Other name: Paola Lct
- Occupations: Social media personality; Model; Actress
- Years active: 2015–present
- Agent(s): Foll-ow, As Talents
- Parent(s): Aline Lopes (mother), Patrice Locatelli (father)
- Family: Mélissa Lopes Locatelli (big sister), Gabriel Locatelli (little brother)

Instagram information
- Page: paolalct
- Followers: 1.7 million

TikTok information
- Page: paolalct
- Followers: 1.1 million (July 07, 2022)

YouTube information
- Channel: Paola lct
- Genre: Lifestyle
- Subscribers: 530.00 thousand (10 Jul 2022)
- Views: 15.86 million (10 Jul 2022)

Paola Locatelli, known online as Paola Lct, is a French influencer, model, actress, and entrepreneur. She first gained attention in 2015, when she was 12, through her YouTube videos, and has since built a significant following across social media platforms.

Locatelli has collaborated with major fashion and beauty brands, launched product lines, and appeared in advertising campaigns. In addition to her online presence, she has expanded into acting and brand ambassadorship, establishing herself as a prominent figure among France's Gen Z celebrities.

== Early life ==
Paola Locatelli was born in Thionville, Moselle, France. She is of Cape Verdean and Italian descent. At the age of two, her family relocated to Vincennes, a suburb of Paris, where she was raised. She has a brother, Gabriel, and a sister, Mélissa.

== Career ==
Paola Locatelli began her career in fashion at the age of 12, launching her own clothing collection, Star Styles, in collaboration with the online fashion retailer Lesara.

In 2019, she gained international attention when she was recognized by Rihanna during a Fenty Beauty event in Seoul. That same year, she was featured in the #VeetParlonsPoils advertising campaign by Veet, aimed at promoting body positivity and encouraging conversations around body hair.

Locatelli has participated in several brand partnerships and media campaigns. In October 2020, during the COVID-19 pandemic, she was invited to the Élysée Palace by government spokesperson Gabriel Attal, along with other influencers, to help promote public health messages to younger audiences.

Later in 2020, she partnered with Ubisoft to promote Just Dance 2021. In May 2021, she released a limited-edition pair of sunglasses in collaboration with the German accessories brand Kapten & Son. That October, she collaborated with Louis Vuitton to create a custom fragrance, developed at the brand's perfumery estate in Grasse.

Locatelli is represented by the French influencer agency Follow, which manages her brand collaborations and contractual negotiations. She is also a brand ambassador for Puma.

== Filmography ==
=== Film ===
- 2023: Jusqu'ici tout va bien (Thicker than water): Lina, on Netflix
- 2022 : Les Liaisons dangereuses (Dangerous Liaisons): Célène, on Netflix.
- 2022: Chair tendre: Anna, on France TV Slash.
- 2025: Rapide: Max

== Activism ==
Paola is godmother of the association named Aïda, which helps young people affected by cancer.
