= Gilles Lellouche =

French actor (born 1972)

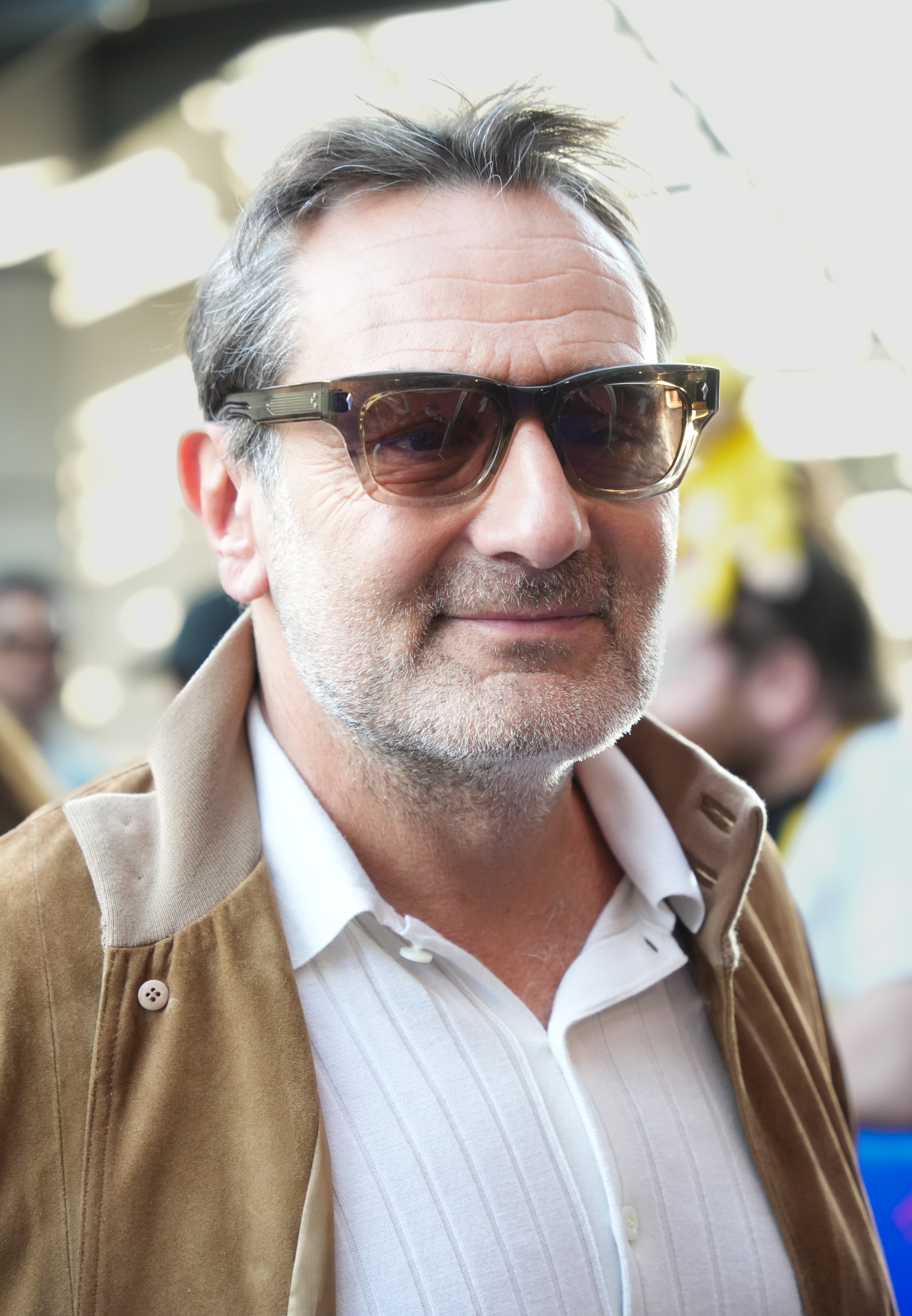
- Lellouche in 2026
- Born: 5 July 1972 (age 54); Savigny-sur-Orge, France
- Occupations: Actor; director; screenwriter
- Years active: 1995–present
- Partners: Mélanie Doutey (2002–2013); Alizée Guinochet (2015–present)
- Children: 2
- Family: Philippe Lellouche (brother)

Gilles Lellouche (French pronunciation: [ʒil ləluʃ]; born 5 July 1972) is a French actor and director. Most known for his performances in Tell No One (2006), Mesrine (2008), Little White Lies (2010), The Players (2012), The Connection (2014), C'est la vie! (2017), In Safe Hands (2018) and BAC Nord (2020). For his performances, Lellouche was nominated for numerous acting César Awards, including twice for Best Actor for In Safe Hands and BAC Nord.

As filmmaker, he directed Sink or Swim (2018) and Beating Hearts (2025), for which he was nominated twice for the César Award for Best Director.

== Early life ==
Lellouche was born in Savigny-sur-Orge, France, to a father of Algerian-Jewish descent, and to a mother of Irish Catholic background. His brother Philippe Lellouche is also an actor and director.

== Personal life ==
From 2002 to 2013, Lellouche was in a relationship with actress Mélanie Doutey, with whom he had a daughter, born on 5 September 2009.

Since 2015, Lellouche has been in a relationship with former model and jewelry designer Alizée Guinochet, with whom he had a son, born in November 2022.

In January 2017, following the backlash over director Roman Polanski being appointed as the president of the 2017 César Awards while being convicted of sexual abuse of a 13-year-old girl and being a fugitive from justice since 1978, Lellouche expressed his support for the director in an interview with Le Parisien, saying; "In France, we make controversies of everything. We die of this in this country. In my opinion, you have to be consistent. Polanski has lived in France for forty years. The facts he was accused of precede this arrival. For all these years, he has been doing films! At that time, it had to be forbidden to live in our territory or to work here. But we welcomed him, we gave him awards, we praise him since he is a big director and he is part of the history of cinema. I am not excusing the facts. But why, today more than yesterday, should there be a scandal? What's going on with us? Have we become Americans? I don't agree with that." [...] "We have many people in France that we have things to criticize and who are still in political, social or economic life. We did not put them in prison, we did not make controversies. Even the victim is tired of this story! To make a scandal only today because he is the president of the Césars, it does not make sense." Polanski later dropped out of presiding over the Césars after the backlash, which included a 61,000-signature petition and calls to boycott the ceremony.

== Filmography ==
=== As actor ===
Year	Title	Role	Director	Notes
2001	My Wife Is an Actress	The policeman	Yvan Attal	
2002	Whatever You Say	Daniel Bénard	Guillaume Canet	
2003	Love Me If You Dare	Sergei Nimov Nimovitch	Yann Samuell	
2004	Narco	The twin skater	Tristan Aurouet & Himself	
2005	Anthony Zimmer	Müller	Jérôme Salle	
2005	Love Is in the Air	Ludo	Rémi Bezançon	Nominated - César Award for Most Promising Actor
2006	Tell No One	Bruno	Guillaume Canet	
2006	On va s'aimer	François	Ivan Calbérac	
2006	Le héros de la famille	Jérôme	Thierry Klifa	
2007	Room of Death	Sylvain	Alfred Lot	
2007	Le dernier gang	Milan	Ariel Zeitoun	
2007	Ma place au soleil	Franck	Eric de Montalier	
2007	Ma vie n'est pas une comédie romantique	Thomas Walkowic	Marc Gibaja	
2008	Paris	Franky	Cédric Klapisch	
2008	Mesrine	Paul	Jean-François Richet	
2008	The Easy Way	Vincent Goumard	Jean-Paul Rouve	
2008	The First Day of the Rest of Your Life	The white rasta	Rémi Bezançon	
2009	Lascars	Zoran	Emmanuel Klotz & Albert Pereira-Lazaro	
2010	Little White Lies	Éric	Guillaume Canet	Nominated - César Award for Best Supporting Actor
2010	Point Blank	Samuel Pierret	Fred Cavayé	
2010	The Extraordinary Adventures of Adèle Blanc-Sec	Inspector Albert Caponi	Luc Besson	
2010	Krach	Erwan Kermor	Fabrice Genestal	
2010	Une petite zone de turbulences	Philippe Faure	Alfred Lot	
2011	My Piece of the Pie	Steve Delarue	Cédric Klapisch	
2011	Mineurs 27	Oscar Herrera	Tristan Aurouet	
2011	Platane	Himself	Éric Judor & Denis Imbert	TV series (2 episodes)
2012	Thérèse Desqueyroux	Bernard Desqueyroux	Claude Miller	Nominated - Globes de Cristal Award for Best Actor
2012	The Players	Various	Michel Hazanavicius, Jean Dujardin, ...	
2012	JC comme Jésus Christ	Himself	Jonathan Zaccaï	
2012	Nos plus belles vacances	Narrator	Philippe Lellouche	
2012	Quand je serai petit	Young Maurice	Jean-Paul Rouve	
2013	The Informant	Marc Duval	Julien Leclercq	
2013	The Ultimate Accessory	Cyrille Cohen	Valérie Lemercier	
2014	The Connection	Gaëtan 'Tany' Zampa	Cédric Jimenez	
2014	Mea Culpa	Franck Vasseur	Fred Cavayé	
2015	Families	Grégoire Piaggi	Jean-Paul Rappeneau	
2015	The Clearstream Affair	Denis Robert	Vincent Garenq	
2015	Les gorilles	Petrovitch	Tristan Aurouet	
2015	Call My Agent !	Himself	Cédric Klapisch	TV series (1 episode)
2016	Sky	Richard	Fabienne Berthaud	
2016	The Jews	Norbert	Yvan Attal	
2017	C'est la vie!	James	Éric Toledano and Olivier Nakache	Nominated - César Award for Best Supporting Actor
2017	The Man with the Iron Heart	Václav Morávek	Cédric Jimenez	
2017	Plonger	César	Mélanie Laurent	
2017	Rock'n Roll	Himself	Guillaume Canet	
2017	Sous le même toit	Yvan Hazan	Dominique Farrugia	
2018	In Safe Hands	Jean	Jeanne Herry	Nominated - César Award for Best Actor
2018	Paris Pigalle	Serge / Georges	Cédric Anger	
2019	Jusqu'ici tout va bien	Fred Bartel	Mohamed Hamidi	
2019	Nous finirons ensemble	Éric	Guillaume Canet	
2020	BAC Nord	Grégory Cerva	Cédric Jimenez	Nominated - César Award for Best Actor
2022	Kompromat	Mathieu	Jérôme Salle	
2022	Smoking Causes Coughing	Benzène	Quentin Dupieux	
2023	Asterix & Obelix: The Middle Kingdom	Obelix	Guillaume Canet	
2023	All Your Faces	Grégoire	Jeanne Herry	
2023	Daaaaaalí!	Salvador Dalí	Quentin Dupieux	
2025	Asterix and Obelix: The Big Fight	Obelix (voice)	Alain Chabat	Animated mini-series

=== As director ===
Year	Title	Notes
1996	2 minutes 36 de bonheur	Short film
2002	Pourkoi... passkeu	Short film
2004	Narco	(codirected with Tristan Aurouet)
2012	The Players	Segment: "'Las Vegas"
2018	Sink or Swim	Nominated - César Award for Best Film; Nominated - César Award for Best Director; Nominated - César Award for Best Original Screenplay
2024	Beating Hearts	Nominated - César Award for Best Director
