= A Spot of Bother (disambiguation) =

A Spot of Bother is a novel by Mark Haddon.

A Spot of Bother may also refer to:

- A Spot of Bother (1938 film), a 1938 British comedy film
- A Spot of Bother (2010 film), a 2010 French comedy drama film based on the Haddon novel
