= Cyril Descours =

French actor (born 1983)

Cyril Descours (born 15 July 1983 in Frankfurt) is a French actor. He has appeared in more than twenty feature films since 2000 as well as in French television films and series, and on stage.

== Career ==
The mother of Cyril Descours was German and he spent much of his childhood in London. By four years of age he could speak in French, German and English. He took part in drama from primary school onwards; and in 1999 enrolled at the Cours Florent where he remained for three years. In 2002 and 2003, he was at the drama classes of the Conservatoire of the 10th arrondissement in Paris. From 2005, he was a member of the Pas de Dieux theatre company, while completing his academic studies which led to him obtaining a Masters in literary translation.

Descours's first stage role was in La guerre de Troie n'aura pas lieu by Jean Giraudoux. After acting in some short films and minor parts, his first major screen role was as Tristan, a 17-year-old who has to look after his baby son after the death of his girlfriend, in a 2003 television film L'Enfant de l'aube (The child of the dawn), directed by Marc Angelo and based on the novel by Patrick Poivre d'Arvor, which attracted over 10 million viewers on TF1 for its broadcast on 14 January 2004.

Around 2005 saw him in two films, as a French student in French for Beginners, and as a young man who meets a Moslem girl in the segment of Paris, je t'aime directed by Gurinder Chadha; on television he featured as Ben in several episodes of the first series of a popular drama Clara Sheller, opposite Frédéric Diefenthal and Mélanie Doutey, and as the drug-dealing son of a farmer in Joseph.

He went on to appear in further historical drama series both on French television, and briefly in the American series John Adams, before featuring in the major French television drama Sa raison d'être (What love means), which traced 30 years of AIDS in France through the experiences of one family.

Descours played leading parts in his following screen roles. In the dysfunctional family in the adaptation of Mark Haddon's 2006 novel A Spot of Bother as the contemporary comedy drama Une petite zone de turbulences (A small area of turbulence), he portrayed the son whose reluctance to let his partner attend his sister's wedding causes their relationship to break down. In Complices (Accomplices) he starred as the murdered male escort whose final weeks are shown interspersed with the investigation to find his killer; this gained Descours a nomination to the César Award for Most Promising Actor in 2011. He then co-starred as an athlete recently blinded in an accident and stifled by the continual compassion of those around him who tries to rebuild his life through his sport in Régis Wargnier's La Ligne droite (Straight line); for this role he trained alongside members of the French athletics squad and was filmed in front of 50,000 people during the Meeting Areva.

He also co-starred in an adaptation of the 1956 novel Madame Solario, as the brother of the title character. As a young man who goes to Paris to pursue a singing career he starred in the 2011 TV film Le Chant des Sirènes (The Siren's song) which won the prize for best film at the La Rochelle film festival that year.

2013 brought another period drama Une femme dans la Révolution (A Woman during the revolution) where he played a young député of the Tiers-État, who has a passionate affair with a young peasant. In a short that year he played the lead singer in a pop group, Boys Band Théorie and also sang the theme song by Alex Beaupain.

Leading and starring roles followed, in films - Ciel rouge (Red sky), shot entirely in Viet Nam, as Philippe Merlen, a French sergeant who deserts to save a Viet Minh prisoner, which results in a brief romance, Les Gardiennes (The care-taking women) as Georges - and television dramas such as Peur sur la base (On the base of fear) as a naval rating suspected of murder, Mystère au Louvre (Mystery at the Louvre) on France 2 as Frédéric Delage, an acrobat who becomes involved in a daring jewel theft, the mini-series Laëtitia, based on real events, as Judge Martinot, and in another series De Gaulle, l’éclat et le secret (De Gaulle, the splendour and the secret) as Geoffroy Chodron de Courcel.

He took the lead role in a 2021 France 2 adaptation of Philippe Claudel's autobiographical novel Le Bruit des trousseaux (The jangling of bunches of keys) about a prison teacher who begins to sacrifice his own life through vicarious involvement with life in prison and that of its inmates, his students.

In 2011 he featured with Emma Watson in a two-minute video advert for a new Lancôme perfume, filmed in Paris.

Alongside screen work, Descours has continued in stage productions, in both classic and modern plays. In 2015 with three other actors (and musicians) he formed a group to practice non-verbal theatre skills on a regular basis; this resulted in productions seen in Paris and Barcelona.

On radio he has appeared as Léon in Madame Bovary on France Culture in 2017.

Cyril Descours is a black belt in karate 2nd Dan, having started at the age of 12, and also practices swimming, roller skating, snowboarding, tennis and riding. He has co-authored two karate books for children.

== Filmography ==
=== Cinema ===
- 2000 : Le Jour de grâce (short) by Jérôme Salle : Grandjean
- 2004 : Troubles Sens by Anna Condo : le serveur / waiter
- 2005 : Ming d'or (short) by Jennifer Devoldère
- 2005 : Französisch für Anfänger (French for beginners) by Christian Ditter : Matthieu
- 2006 : Paris, je t'aime (Paris, I love you), in the segment Quais de Seine directed by Gurinder Chadha : François
- 2007 : Silence ! on voudrait bien s'aimer (Silence, we would like to make love) (short) by Alain Minot : Jeannot
- 2009 : Une petite zone de turbulences (A small area of turbulence) by Alfred Lot : Mathieu Muret
- 2010 : Complices (Complicit) by Frédéric Mermoud : Vincent
- 2011 : La Ligne droite (The straight line) by Régis Wargnier : Yannick
- 2011 : Madame Solario by René Féret : Eugène Harden
- 2013 : Boys Band Théorie (short) by Christophe Charrier : Nathan
- 2014 : Passer l'hiver (Overwinter) by Aurélia Barbet : Michel, the man in the van
- 2015 : Ciel Rouge (Red sky) by Olivier Lorelle : Philippe Merlen
- 2017 : Chez nous (Our home) by Lucas Belvaux : Jean-Baptiste Verhaeghe
- 2017 : Les Gardiennes by Xavier Beauvois : Georges

=== Television ===
- 2003 : L'Enfant de l'aube, by Marc Angelo : Tristan (TF1)
- 2004 : Les Montana, by Benoît d'Aubert : Johan Kowalski (France 2)
- 2004–2005 : Clara Sheller (series 1) by Renaud Bertrand : Ben (France 2)
- 2005 : Joseph, téléfilm of Marc Angelo : Léo Johassin (TF1)
- 2006 : Le Président Ferrare by Alain Nahum (episode 'L'Affaire Gilles d'Aubert') : Romain (France 2)
- 2006 : Vive la bombe ! by Jean-Pierre Sinapi : Philippe (Arte) (concerning the Béryl incident)
- 2006 : Rilke et Rodin, une rencontre by Bernard Malaterre : Rainer Maria Rilke (Arte)
- 2007 : L'Affaire Christian Ranucci : Le Combat d'une mère by Denys Granier-Deferre : Maître le Plantier (lawyer) (TF1)
- 2007 : Sa raison d'être by Renaud Bertrand : Jérôme (France 2)
- 2007 : John Adams by Tom Hooper : Citizen Genet (HBO) (in English)
- 2008 : La reine et le cardinal by Marc Rivière – Louis XIV as a 20 year-old (France 2)
- 2010 : Un village français (six episodes) : Yvon, a communist envoy from Paris (France 3)
- 2011 : Le Chant des Sirènes by Laurent Herbiet : le garçon (broadcast by France 2 in June 2014)
- 2013 : Une femme dans la Révolution by Jean-Daniel Verhaeghe : Benjamin (France 3)
- 2015 : La Fin de la nuit by Lucas Belvaux : Thomas Pian (RTB/France 3)
- 2017 : Peur sur la base by Laurence Katrian : Nathan Berken (France 3)
- 2017 : Mystère au Louvre by Léa Fazer : Frédéric Delage (France 2)
- 2019 : Laëtitia (mini-series) by Jean-Xavier de Lestrade : Le Juge Martinot (France 2)
- 2020 : De Gaulle, l’éclat et le secret (series) by François Velle : Geoffroy Chodron de Courcel (France 2)
- 2021 : Le Bruit des trousseaux : Alexis Pasquier (TV film on France 2)
- 2025 : La Manière forte : Substitut Albertini

== Theatre ==
- 1999 : La guerre de Troie n'aura pas lieu of Jean Giraudoux
- 2000 : Le Mariage de Figaro of Beaumarchais
- 2001 : Les Femmes savantes of Molière
- 2001 : Art of Yasmina Reza
- 2001 : Le Dindon of Georges Feydeau
- 2002 : Il est important d’être Aimé (The Importance of Being Earnest) of Oscar Wilde
- 2002 : Qui a peur de Virginia Woolf ? of Edward Albee
- 2003 : Romeo and Juliet of Shakespeare
- 2004 : Tartuffe of Molière
- 2005 : Les Caprices de Marianne of Alfred de Musset
- 2005 : Demandes en Mariage of Michel Melki
- 2006 : Don Qui of Leela Alaniz
- 2007 : Palindromes of Leela Alaniz
- 2017 : Õ Gilgamesh of Edgar Alemany (CAGE Compagnie)
- 2019-22 : Edmond of Alexis Michalik (Théâtre du Palais-Royal) : Léonidas Volny (Christian)
