= Agent Z and the Penguin from Mars =

1996 British TV series

- Cover for Agent Z and the Penguin From Mars on which the series was based.
- Country of origin: United Kingdom
- Original language: English

Production
- Running time: 25 minutes approx.

Original release
- Network: BBC One, Children's BBC
- Release: January 3 – February 7, 1996

Agent Z and the Penguin from Mars is a 1996 Children's BBC sitcom, based on the book of the same name by Mark Haddon.

The six-episode series followed the exploits of Ben Simpson, played by Duncan Barton, and his friends Barney, played by Andrew McKay, and Jenks, played by Reggie Yates, who together formed the "Crane Grove Gang", named after the street where they lived. This was a society dedicated to playing ingenious practical jokes in an initiative called "Agent Z".

== Plot ==
Following the arrival of an unpleasant and dull new astronomer neighbour Dennis Sidebottom, a supposed lottery winner, the gang plot their biggest ever practical joke: an elaborate conspiracy involving a penguin stolen from a supermarket Christmas display, an alien from Mars, a spaceship and a "message for mankind" carved on a meteorite.

The series also included a number of subplots, such as Ben's infatuation with Sidebottom's pianist daughter, Samantha, and the thieving activities of the Sidebottom's disturbing son, Tod – on one occasion he is caught shoplifting a large quantity of Dolly Parton albums.

It was also notable for its realisations of Ben's fevered imagination, which led to extravagant dream sequences, such as a recurring image of him as a millionaire, complete with a well-spoken butler called Finlay, and another featuring Sidebottom as a vampire.

== Broadcast ==
The series was first shown on Wednesdays from 3 January 1996 to 7 February 1996. Although well received it has not been repeated, nor released to DVD, despite the renewed interest in the work of Mark Haddon following the publication of The Curious Incident of the Dog in the Night-Time.

Haddon said of his experience on creating the TV series: "The two lasting things I got from the experience were a) a plastic meteorite and b) a friendship with the producer, Marilyn Fox, which kick-started my script-writing career."
