= West Pier =

Ruined 19th century pier in Brighton, England

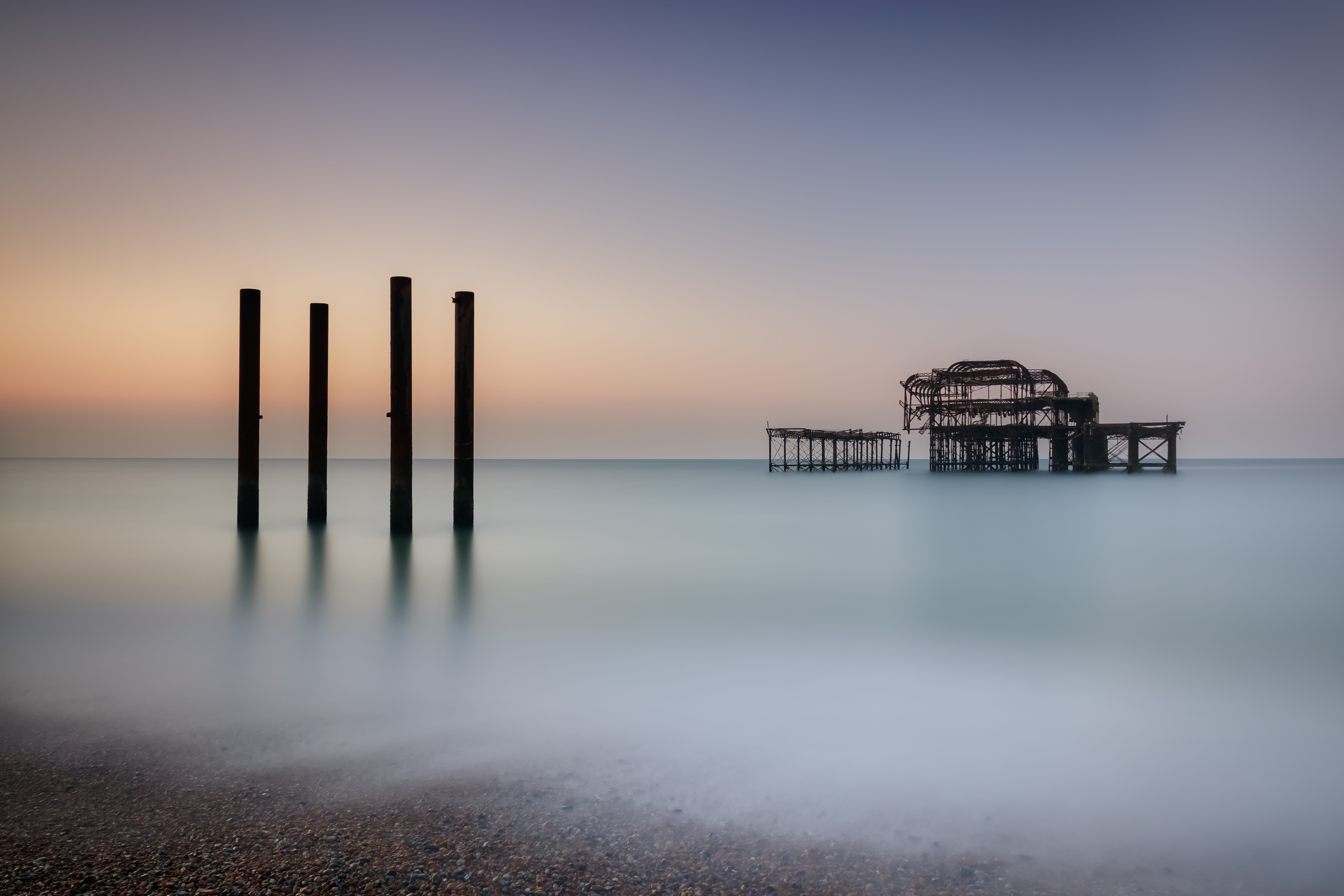
- Remains of the West Pier in 2018
- Type: Pleasure Pier
- Location: Brighton
- Coordinates: 50°49′15″N 0°09′04″W
- Official name: West Pier
- Owner: West Pier Trust

Characteristics
- Total length: 1,115 feet (340 m)

History
- Designer: Eugenius Birch
- Opening date: 6 October 1866
- Closure date: 1975

Listed Building – Grade I
- Official name: The West Pier
- Designated: 9 October 1969
- Reference no.: 1381655

The West Pier is a ruined pier in Brighton, England. Designed by Eugenius Birch and opening in 1866, the West End Pier, as it was originally known, was the first pier to be Grade I listed in England but has become increasingly derelict since its closure to the public in 1975. As of 2026 only a partial metal framework remains.

The pier was constructed during a boom in pleasure pier building in the 1860s, and was designed to attract tourists to Brighton. It was the town's second pier, joining the Royal Suspension Chain Pier that opened in 1823. The West Pier was extended in 1893, and a concert hall was added in 1916. The pier reached its peak attendance at this time, with 2 million visitors between 1918 and 1919. Its popularity began to decline after World War II, and concerts were replaced by a funfair and tearoom. A local company took over ownership of the pier in 1965, but could not meet the increasing costs of maintenance and filed for bankruptcy.

The pier closed to the public in 1975 and fell into disrepair and gradually collapsed. Major sections fell into the sea during storms in late 2002, and two separate fires, both thought to be arson, in March and May 2003 destroyed most of the remaining structure, leading to English Heritage declaring it beyond repair. Some structured demolition took place in 2010 to make way for the i360 observation tower; further structural damage from storms has occurred since. A considerable section of the pier fell into the sea during Storm Austen in 2026.

The West Pier Trust owns the remains and has proposed various renovation plans. Some schemes have been opposed by local residents and the owners of the nearby Palace Pier, claiming unfair competition.

== History ==
=== 19th century ===
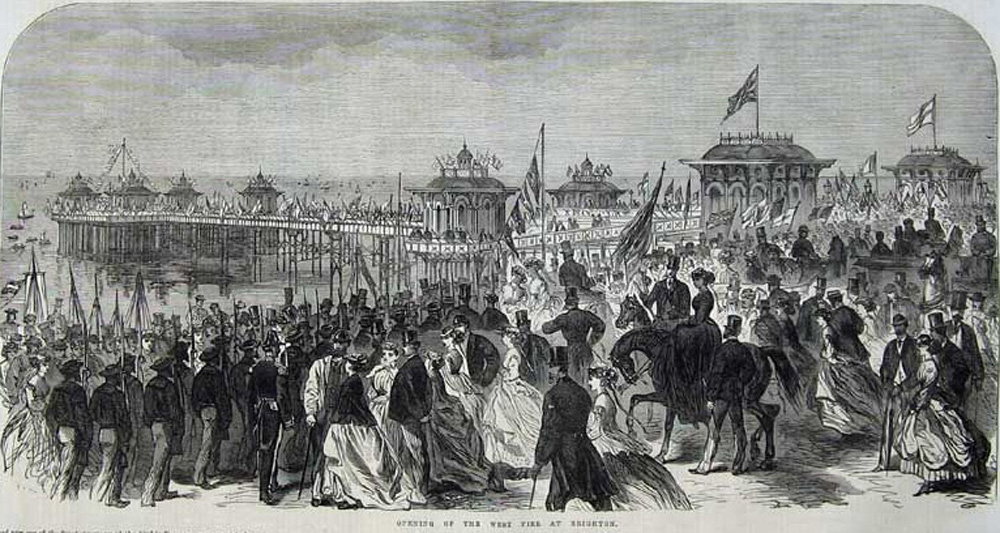
The opening of West Pier in 1866 from the Illustrated London News.

The West Pier was constructed during a boom in pleasure pier building in the 1860s, during which 22 new piers were erected across Britain. It was designed by architect Eugenius Birch as a place for seaside visitors to enjoy fresh sea air. Some wealthy residents in the nearby Regency Square objected to construction, complaining that the planned toll houses at the entrance would spoil the view of the sea from their homes. It was felt that the pier would have a positive effect on property values in the town, so the pier was approved by the Brighton West Pier Order 1864. Construction began in 1863 and the pier opened to the public on 6 October 1866.

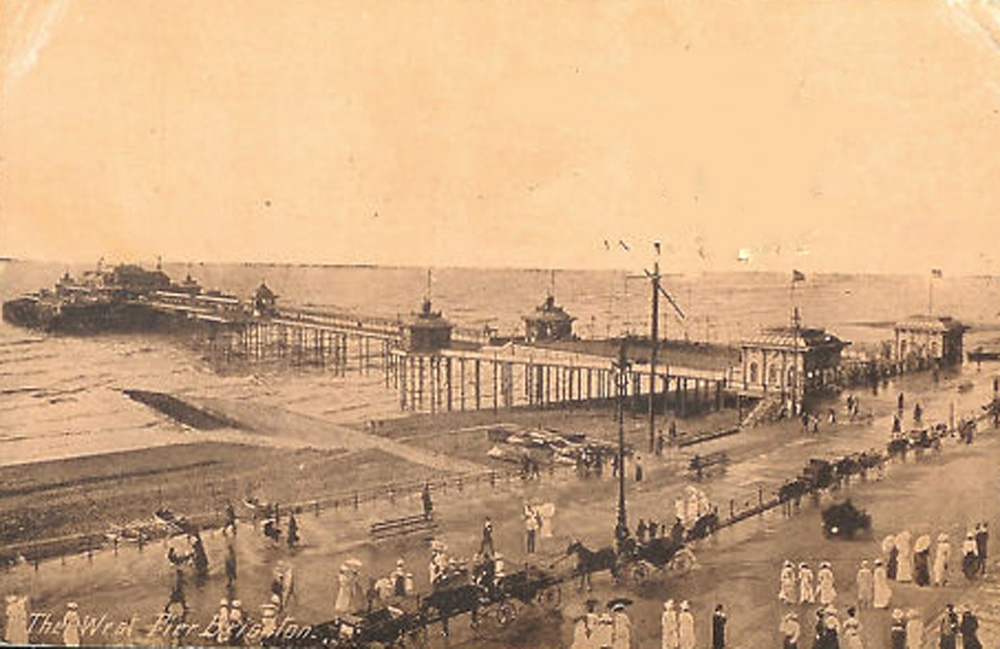
West Pier circa 1900. By this time a central bandstand and full-length weather screens had been added. A pavilion had opened in 1893.

The pier's length was 1,115 feet (340 m) with a width of 310 feet (94 m) at the pierhead. It was built with cast iron threaded columns screwed into the seabed. The superstructure's ironwork was manufactured by Robert Laidlaw, featuring an "oriental" style. By the opening, the pier was fitted with gas lamps with ornamental serpent designs, which had been directly influenced by similar examples inside the nearby Royal Pavilion. The pier had ornamental houses, two toll houses and glass screens at the pierhead to protect visitors from the weather. A New Scientist report covering Britain's piers called the pier Birch's "masterpiece".

In 1893, the pierhead was extended under the supervision of Birch's nephew, Peregrine, who added a pavilion with a capacity for 1,400 people. After the Royal Suspension Chain Pier was demolished following a storm in 1896, the West Pier became the only one on Brighton's seafront until the construction of the Palace Pier in 1899.

=== 20th century ===
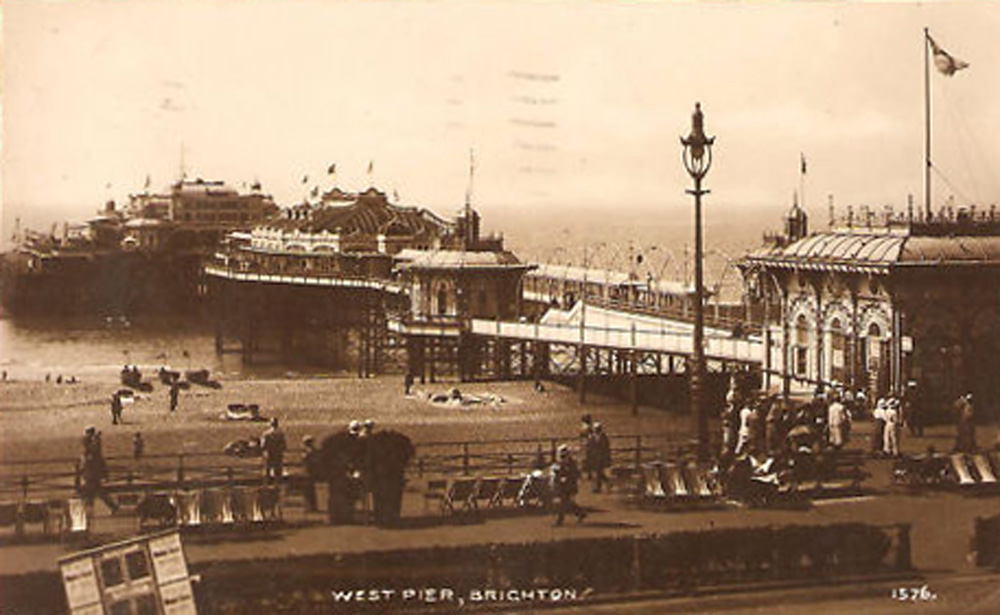
The West Pier circa 1920. The pier had gained a new concert hall in 1916, and attracted 2 million visitors between 1918 and 1919.

In April 1900, seven sailors from HMS Desperate drowned in bad weather as they approached the pier.

By the early 20th century, the earlier priority of good sea air on the pier had been replaced with a desire for public entertainment. The pier reached record levels of attendance in the early 20th century, attracting around 1.5 million visitors between 1910 and 1911. Attendance fell due to the onset of World War I, but increased afterwards, with around 2 million people visiting between 1918 and 1919. Competition with the Palace Pier led to a new concert hall, designed by local architects Clayton & Black. The 19th-century bandstand was demolished between 1914 and 1916. It was replaced by an eight-sided grand concert hall, constructed from cast-iron arches. It opened on 20 April 1916 with a concert by the King's Royal Rifles silver band, made up of war veterans.

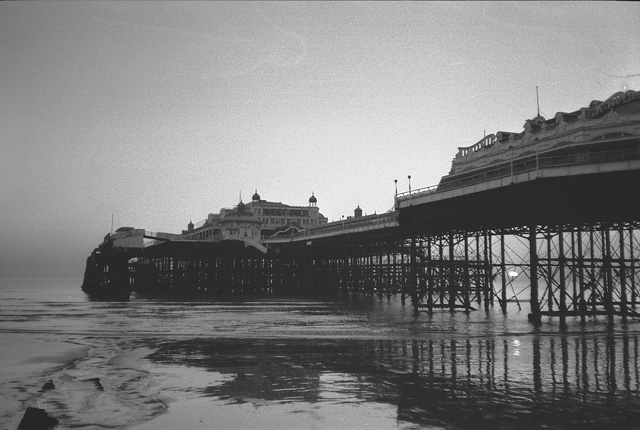
The West Pier in 1973. The pierhead was closed in 1970 due to safety concerns and the whole structure needed urgent repairs.

The concert hall had an in-house orchestra by November, and ticket sales for concerts accounted for 43% of the pier's revenue by 1920. The West Pier was favoured by locals, while the Palace Pier was used more by day trippers. A top-deck entrance was added to the hall in 1932. The pier's central decking was removed during World War II to prevent enemy landings, and its popularity began to decline. On 26 November 1944, a Royal Air Force Hawker Typhoon fighter hit the pier, crashing onto the beach. The pilot sustained head injuries. The fighter was one of four aircraft escorting a VIP flight.

The concert hall was converted into a tea room and the theatre redesigned as a restaurant in the early 1950s. A funfair was added around the same time. By the 1960s, the pier was suffering from serious financial difficulties. In 1965, it was bought by a company owning some seafront hotels and entertainment venues. They had ambitions for the pier but were unable to cope with increasing maintenance costs. Some portions of wood and iron from the pier fell on the beach, and the pierhead was closed in 1970 due to safety concerns. The pier was Grade II listed in 1969 and the council served compulsory repair notices, but the company was unable to afford them and opted for voluntary liquidation. The remainder of the pier was closed in 1975 when the Brighton Corporation declined to buy it, passing control to the Crown Estate Commissioners.

== Restoration attempts ==
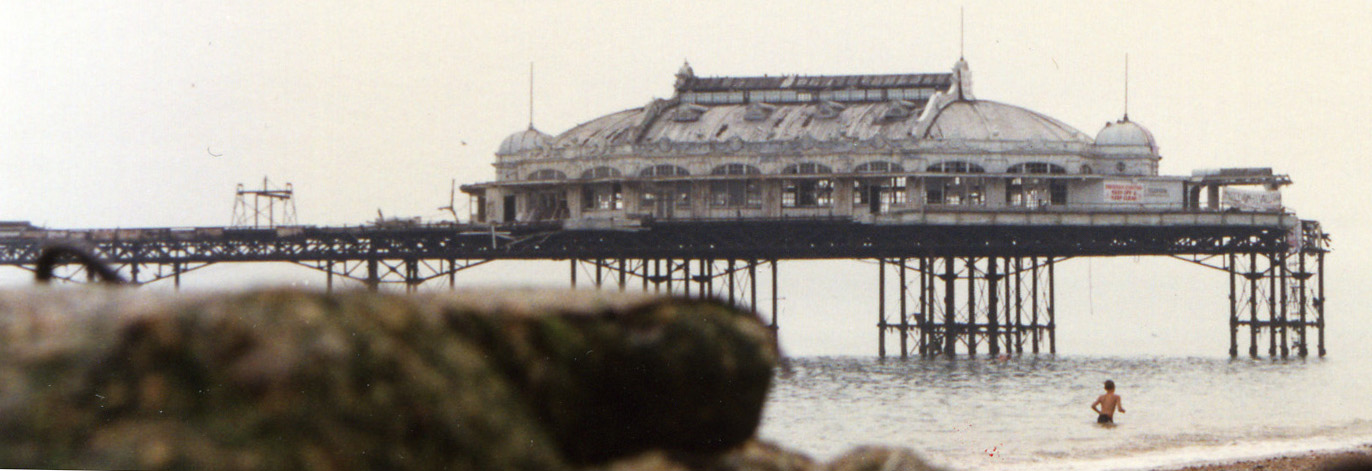
Remains of the pier in 1995

After 1975, attempts were made to restore the pier. Supporters complained that the council was more interested in developing Brighton Marina. In 1982, the pier became the only one in Britain to be awarded Grade I listed status. The West Pier Trust was formed to save the pier, and bought it from the council in 1983 for a peppercorn fee of £100, although the council also demanded £800,000 required for immediate repairs before it could be opened to the public. A proposal to restore the pier with a 60-metre (200 ft) ferris wheel failed after the backer went bankrupt.

=== Decline and damage ===
The pier suffered structural damage due to the Great Storm of 1987, and access from the shore was removed for safety reasons in 1991. The West Pier Trust continued to offer regular tours of the pier throughout the 1990s. In 1998, the National Lottery pledged £14 million to restore the pier, but the West Pier Trust was unable to find a suitable partner to help with restoration. The owners of the Palace Pier, who had become financially self-sufficient under their own means, claimed unfair competition. In 2001, English Heritage identified the pier as the most at-risk Grade I listed structure in England.

In December 2002, the pier partially collapsed during a storm, when a walkway connecting the concert hall and pavilion fell into the sea. The following month, the concert hall in the middle of the pier fell over, leaving the entire structure close to total collapse.

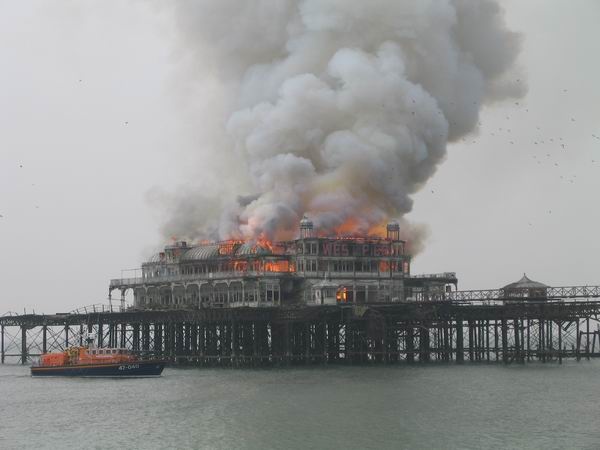
The West Pier on fire in March 2003.

On 28 March 2003, the pavilion at the pierhead caught fire. Fire crews were unable to save the building from destruction because the collapsed walkway prevented them from reaching it. As fire investigators were unable to access the site for safety reasons, the cause of the fire remains unknown, although it is thought to have been arson. A more severe fire, also thought to have been intentional, burned through 11 and 12 May 2003, consuming most of what was left of the concert hall. On 23 June 2004, high winds caused the middle of the pier to collapse completely. The following month, English Heritage declared the pier beyond repair.

The West Pier Trust remained adamant that they would soon begin full restoration work. Retired boxer and local resident Chris Eubank criticised the delays, saying he could raise the money himself in six months. In December 2004, the trust confirmed the restoration would not be going ahead after their plans were rejected by the Heritage Lottery Fund. The pier was partially demolished in February 2010, partly to make way for the planned i360 observation tower. In February 2014, due to stormy weather, the pier split in half and a large part of the centre fell into the sea. Waves swept away the eastern side of the damaged metal skeleton, which remained after the 2003 fire. A selection of artefacts rescued from the pier is exhibited in the Brighton Fishing Museum. A further section of the pier collapsed in February 2016.

The construction of the i360 revived interest in building a new West Pier on the site of the original. The West Pier Trust was hopeful that it could be in place by 2026 in time for the pier's 160th anniversary, but by October 2016, the trust had concluded that restoration of the original West Pier was beyond any practical means.

In 2019, the trust sought to restore a Victorian-era octagonal kiosk that was salvaged from the pier in 1996 and planned to raise the estimated cost of about £750,000 using a crowdfunding campaign among other avenues. The trust stated in 2022 that their lottery application to support this work had been unsuccessful. It also started periodic auctioning of various remains and fragments of the pier to fund a new seaside learning centre at the site of the original kiosk. Another Brighton-based organisation, City Partnerships, proposed construction of a new pier in the original location, which would be free to enter like the original and complement the nearby Brighton Palace Pier but this was opposed by the West Pier Trust as unrealistic.

Part of the southwest corner of the pier collapsed overnight during Storm Claudio in November 2022. During Storm Austen in October 2026, the part of the pier joining the west side to the pavilion centre collapsed into the sea.

== Art ==
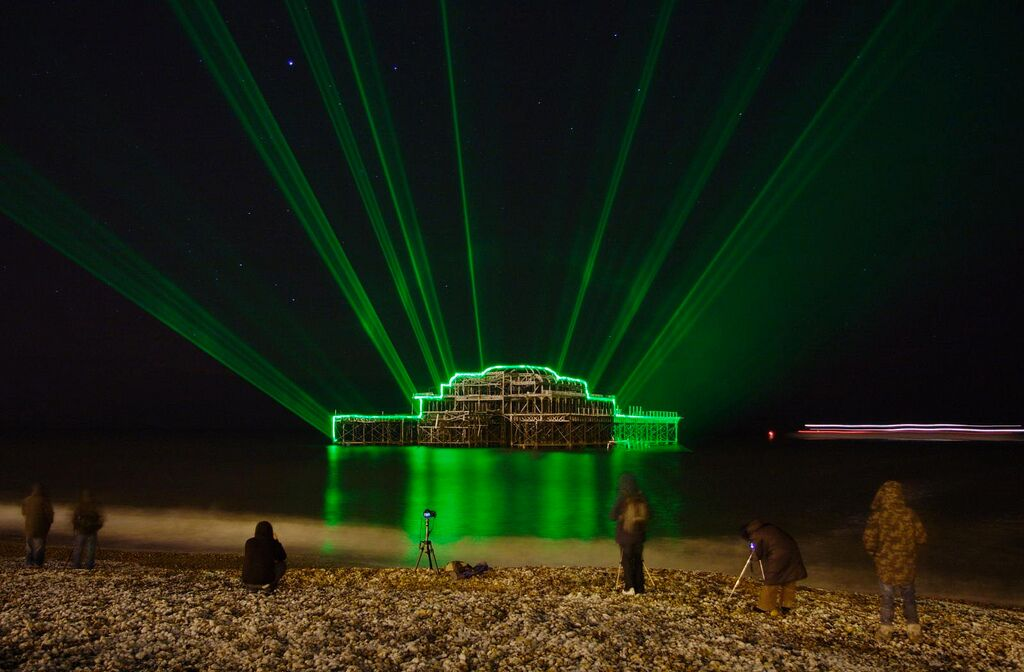
Laser illuminations in 2010

In 2010, the West Pier was illuminated with 3D mapping lasers as part of a series of artworks by Josef O'Connor to celebrate the Chinese New Year of the Tiger. The pier was illuminated by computer-controlled laser drawings to make it appear and disappear on the horizon, giving the appearance of reconnecting it to the shore.

== Media appearances ==
The pier can be seen in several films, including Oh! What a Lovely War (1968), Villain (1971) and Carry On Girls (1973) which was filmed on the pier and in locations nearby in Brighton. It was also prominently featured in the French comedy The Wild Goose Chase (La Course à l'échalote, 1975), starring Pierre Richard and Jane Birkin.

In Nick Cave's novel The Death of Bunny Munro, Bunny's son speculates on a reason for the 2003 fires. The band James filmed the video for "Just Like Fred Astaire" on and around the West Pier.

Mark Haddon's title story in the 2016 collection The Pier Falls concerns the fictional collapse of the pier in 1970.

== See also ==
- National Piers Society
- List of piers in the United Kingdom
