= Kia and Cosmos =

2019 Bengali detective film

- Teaser poster
- Directed by: Sudipto Roy
- Written by: Sudipto Roy
- Story by: Sudipto Roy
- Based on: The Curious Incident of the Dog in the Night Time by Mark Haddon
- Produced by: Christopher Cornelsen; Pawan Kanodia; Prachi Kanodia
- Starring: Ritwika Pal; Swastika Mukherjee; Joy Sengupta
- Cinematography: Aditya Varma
- Edited by: Anirban Maity
- Music by: Neel Adhikari
- Production company: AVA Film Productions Pvt. Ltd
- Release date: 29 March 2019
- Running time: 123 minutes
- Country: India
- Languages: Bengali and English

Kia and Cosmos is a 2019 Indian whodunit drama film in Bengali and English, directed by debutant director Sudipto Roy and produced by Christopher Cornelsen, Pawan Kanodia and Prachi Kanodia under the banner of AVA Film Productions Pvt. Ltd. The story follows 15-year-old Kia who lives with her single mother, and her journey from Kolkata to Kalimpong to investigate the murder of a neighborhood cat named Cosmos. The film was released on 29 March 2019. The movie is loosely based on The Curious Incident of the Dog in the Night-Time novel by Mark Haddon.

== Synopsis ==
Kia is a 15-year-old autistic teenager living with her single mother. One day, her pregnant cat, Cosmos, vanishes and Kia feels that it is not a normal disappearance but a murder. Kia sets out on a journey to find what happened to Cosmos.

== Cast ==
- Ritwika Pal as Kia Chaterjee
- Swastika Mukherjee as Dia Chaterjee
- Mita Chaterjee
- Sraman Chaterjee as Rabi
- Zahid Hossain as Souvik
- Joy Sengupta as Kabir Chaterjee
- Amaan Reza as Anup

== Release ==
The official trailer of the film was released by Times Music on 9 March 2019.

The film received cinematic release in India on 29 March 2019.

=== Streaming ===
The film was made available on Netflix in North America, the United Kingdom and Australia in May 2019.
