= The Porpoise =

2019 novel by Mark Haddon

- First edition
- Author: Mark Haddon
- Language: English
- Publisher: Chatto & Windus
- Publication date: 2019
- Publication place: United Kingdom
- Media type: Print

The Porpoise is a novel by English author Mark Haddon published in 2019, best known for his first novel The Curious Incident of the Dog in the Night-Time. It was shortlisted for the Goldsmiths Prize.

== Plot introduction ==
The story begins when the unborn baby's mother is killed when a light-aircraft crashes, triggering her birth. Born into "part of a global aristocracy" since Hellenistic times, her father Philippe treats his daughter Angelica as a sexual plaything. An art dealer Darius opens her eyes on her dependency on her father. The Shakespeare play Pericles morphs Darius into Pericles, as the challenger to an incestuous father. The novel has glimpses into Angelica's life but the bulk of the narrative is based around Pericles, his wife and his daughter Marina with asides to Jacobean London with Shakespeare and the co-author George Wilkins.

== Reception ==
- Justine Jordan in The Guardian praises the novel as it "shimmers and shifts direction, slipping into a classical past where the historical references of the early sections become vivid reality. We sail with Pericles, prince of Tyre; through feasts and famines, plagues and mutinies, the stories – and after-stories – of his lost wife and child unroll...The different worlds sometimes jut into each other as the narrative dances on the threshold between reality and imagination. Lonely, myth-obsessed Angelica 'is both teller and listener. She forgets, sometimes, where the page ends and her mind begins'. But the extraordinary force and vividness of Haddon’s prose ensure that The Porpoise reads not as a metatextual game but as a continually unfolding demonstration of the transporting power of stories."
- In The Observer, Anthony Cummins is also exuberant, saying that "Line by line, Haddon throws everything at making it a transcendent, transporting experience – which is part of the point, given that The Porpoise turns on the consolations of storytelling, which aren’t just a cliche in a book that is essentially about a girl seeking to escape her ravaged body. A helix, a mirror ball, a literary box of tricks... take your pick: this is a full-spectrum pleasure, mixing metafictional razzmatazz with pulse-racing action and a prose style to die for. I’ll be staggered if it’s not spoken of whenever prizes are mentioned this year.
- Gabido Inglelsius, writing for NPR, had some reservations and summarizes "The Porpoise is a rich, beautiful read. Its shortcomings are masked by Haddon's dazzling use of language and talent for describing action and feelings. It's a rough, bizarre, magical journey, and readers will not come out of it untouched."
- Ron Charles in The Washington Post praises the "way Haddon has streamlined this ramshackle tale into a sleek voyage of gripping tribulation is fantastic. But what’s especially remarkable is that the modern-day scenes interwoven with Pericles’ ancient adventures feel no less electrifying. The contemporary events have been polished to an antique patina and endowed with classical weight. While the prince is twisting away from murderers and surviving ship-crushing storms, young Angelica remains stock still in her father’s mansion. Barred from fight or flight, she has nonetheless devised a method of defying her father’s sexual assaults — a method as ingenious as it is self-destructive. In scenes of frozen agony, Haddon explores the insidious ways that class silences suspicion and camouflages Philippe’s abuse, requiring his daughter to exercise power in the only way left to her."
