= Sos Eltis =

British academic

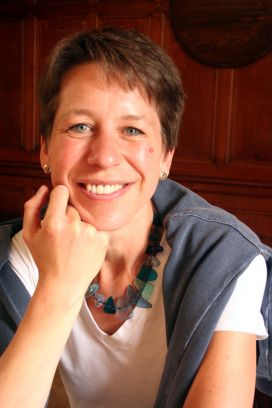
- Born: United Kingdom
- Spouse: Mark Haddon
- Children: 2

Academic background
- Education: MA, DPhil, University of Oxford

Academic work
- Discipline: English literature
- Institutions: Brasenose College, Oxford

Sos Eltis is an English author. She is a fellow and tutor in English at Brasenose College, Oxford. She is a nineteenth- and twentieth-century specialist, with a special interest in theatre.

Eltis is the author of Revising Wilde: Society and Subversion in the Plays of Oscar Wilde, which has been described as "a radical re-examination of the plays of Oscar Wilde", and of Acts of Desire: Women and Sex on Stage 1800–1930.

Eltis is married to the English novelist Mark Haddon, author of The Curious Incident of the Dog in the Night-Time, which is dedicated to her.
