= The Pier Falls =

2016 short story collection by Mark Haddon

- First edition (UK)
- Author: Mark Haddon
- Cover artist: Suzanne Dean incorporates deckchair canvas supplied by The Stripes Company, Chester.
- Language: English
- Publisher: Jonathan Cape (UK); Doubleday (US)
- Publication date: 2016
- Publication place: United Kingdom
- Media type: Print
- Pages: 347
- ISBN: 1910702161

The Pier Falls is the first short story collection by Mark Haddon published in 2016 and contains nine stories generally disturbing and dark. Mark Haddon is best known for his prize-winning first novel The Curious Incident of the Dog in the Night-Time.

== Stories ==
- The Pier Falls (New Statesman in April 2014) - The title story concerns the collapse of Brighton's West Pier on a Summer day in 1970 (in reality the pier was closed due to safety issues). Rivets start to fail as the structure falls into the sea, and many holidaymakers lose their lives as the death toll increases.
- The Island (Ox-Tales, 2009) - Based on Greek Mythology, princess Ariadne is abandoned by Theseus on uninhabited Naxos where she has enjoyed all luxury in the past. But she now has to try to find food to keep herself alive. But she is immortal.
- Bunny (runner up for BBC National Short Story Award 2015) - morbidly obese man Bunny finds love with his girlfriend Leah. She feeds him his favourite food, proposes to him and makes it the happiest day of his life. But she also poisons his food with Diazepam. As his pillows are removed behind his back, he struggles to breathe, loses consciousness and dies.
- Wodwo (a loose reworking of Gawain and the Green Knight) - On a snowy Christmas Eve a stranger enters a family house carrying a shotgun. Gavin picks up the weapon and kills the stranger but believes the gun is fake. The stranger later gets up and leaves. Gavin life degenerates as he becomes a homeless addict. A year later the stranger reappears and Gavin's index finger is severed and Gavin returns to his house.
- The Gun - In 1972, ten-year old-Daniel's friend Sean reveals he has a loaded gun in his flat and they take the gun to the woods near to Robert Hales scrapyard. Sean tries to shoot a target when Robert appears and Sean threatens to kill him. Robert walks away and disappears. Sean believes he has later shot Robert but instead killed a deer. 40 years later Daniel returns to the woods and meets Robert...
- The Woodpecker and the Wolf - The first expedition (Endurance) is established on Mars when they discover that one of the six team members is pregnant. The second expedition (Halcyon) then fails and the supplies do not reach Mars. The first expedition sacrifice themselves in the hope that the mother and baby survive. Sparrowhawk identifies the fault with Halcyon and eventually reaches Mars and discover that the mother and baby have survived.
- Breathe - Carol visits her mother in the UK and is shocked by the filthy state of the house and mother. Carol starts to clear the house and washes her mother, but her mother is then sent to a psychiatric ward and claims that this is not her house. Carol's sister Robyn explains that her mother does not understand what has happened to the house...
- The Boys Who Left Home to Learn Fear - A search party concerns the adventures of a group of Victorian explorers on a doomed dense jungle expedition to a vast cave.
- The Weir - Kelly throws herself from the weir, her knapsack loaded with stones and she nearly drowns. The narrator enters the water, manages to free the knapsack and later befriends her.

== Reception ==
- Lionel Shriver praises the collection in the Financial Times "I know, I know: you're probably tepid on short stories. The preponderance of fiction readers prefers a proper novel. But good stories are condensed novels - dizzying efficient novels which suck you into the same immersive world as full-length fiction, then spit you out a little dazed, wondering what just happened."
- Alex Clark in The Guardian also praises Mark Haddon's debut collection as being "exuberant, lusty exercises in juxtaposition: intimacy and estrangement, exoticism and domesticity, innocuousness and malevolence, the cataloguing of minute detail and the expansiveness of the zoomed-out lens... Haddon's protagonists attempt to escape isolation while remaining intensely, covertly committed to it; his landscapes bustle and resonate with the impact of human affairs but, naturally, remain almost entirely indifferent to them."
- Tim Martin in New Statesman remarks on Mark Haddon's bleakness of his first book of short stories and 'seems to have stumped even his publishers, who have decided, in the blurb, to make the rather shell-shocked protestation that "his imagination is even darker than we had thought”. Certainly, anyone who came to Haddon's work through The Curious Incident of the Dog in the Night-Time and its Olivier Award-winning stage adaptation will get a shock from this merciless collection, which opens with a story about the death of 64 people in a seaside accident and moves on briskly to other tales featuring starvation, dismemberment, evisceration, euthanasia, suicide, amputation, shooting, poisoning and incineration.'
