= The Red House (Haddon novel) =

Novel by Mark Haddon

- First edition
- Author: Mark Haddon
- Cover artist: Paul Willoughby
- Language: English
- Genre: novel
- Publisher: Jonathan Cape
- Publication date: 2016
- Publication place: United Kingdom
- Media type: Print
- Pages: 272
- ISBN: 0-22-409640-0

The Red House was published in 2012 by English author Mark Haddon, set in Herefordshire in 2010.

== Plot ==
Richard, a successful doctor attempts to reconcile his long-estranged sister Angela in the wake of the death of their mother. He invites her family to spend a week in the Herefordshire countryside near Hay-on-Wye in the Black Mountains. Richard has remarried Louisa and her wilful daughter Melissa; Angela is married to a feckless husband, Dominic, and has three children; Alex, Daisy, and Benjy. Over a week the two families mingle, falling out and making up with complex combinations in a holiday let in the eponymous Red House. The viewpoints of the eight family members are revealed as serious undercurrents appear from the past.

== Reception ==
- Carol Birch writing in The Guardian remarks of the novel, "Haddon achieves a remarkable mélange of streams of consciousness, snatches of books, music, TV, private thoughts, lists, letters, all intertwined with sharply observed vignettes of everyday banality, soaring flights of description and odd bursts of heavy-handed portentousness." She added, "The Red House is his darkest work yet, but it's not cynical...Life just goes on in its usual ramshackle way, generously offering up new mornings. By the time they're packing up to leave at the end of the week, has anything really changed? Superficially very little. We are left dangling, but in a strangely satisfying way."
- BookBrowse explains that "because of Haddon's extraordinary narrative technique, the stories of these eight people are anything but simple. Told through the alternating viewpoints of each character, The Red House becomes a symphony of long-held grudges, fading dreams and rising hopes, tightly-guarded secrets and illicit desires, all adding up to a portrait of contemporary family life that is bittersweet, comic, and deeply felt. As we come to know each character they become profoundly real to us. We understand them, even as we come to realize they will never fully understand each other, which is the tragicomedy of every family. The Red House is a literary tour-de-force that illuminates the puzzle of family in a profoundly empathetic manner - a novel sure to entrance the millions of readers of The Curious Incident of the Dog in the Night-Time."
- Lionel Shriver in the Financial Times wrote of the novel, "there’s a price to pay for seeking the familiar. Finish the book and nothing’s changed. Mark Haddon’s The Red House appeals for just this sense of comfortable kinship. Extending one’s imagination to embrace these characters isn't a strain...The set-up is accessible as well, since many an extended family has experienced the claustrophobia and volatility of being shut up in a cottage with nothing on the agenda but – the horror, the horror – fun...Haddon is a gifted writer and lifts the tone above soap opera. Nevertheless, there is a soporific mildness to this book – to the characters, the plot, and even the writing. I didn’t mind it – the experience of reading the novel was pleasant enough – but in short order I’m certain to forget all about it (alas, like most books)."(subscription required)
- Heller McAlpin of NPR wrote, "by doubling the number of points of view in The Red House, Haddon has so fractured his narrative that it rarely gains momentum and feels as fragmented as its characters."
