= Boom! (novel) =

2008 children's science fiction novel by Mark Haddon

- Cover of Gridzbi Spudvetch!
- Author: Mark Haddon
- Original title: Gridzbi Spudvetch!
- Genre: Science fiction; Children's
- Publisher: Walker Books
- Publication date: 25 February 1993
- ISBN: 978-0-744-52425-3

Boom! is a 2008 children's science fiction novel by English writer and illustrator Mark Haddon. It is the revised version of Haddon's Gridzbi Spudvetch!, published in 1993.

== Plot ==
Boom! tells the story of two best friends, Charlie and Jimbo (a nickname for James). When Jimbo's sister, Becky, says that the teachers are going to send him to a school for mentally ill children, Jimbo and Charlie sneak into the staff room, where they hid a walkie-talkie to eavesdrop on the teachers' conversation, in order to confirm what Becky said was true. None of the information they hear means anything (which points to the fact that Becky was just trying to scare Jimbo), except for the surprising fact that their teachers Mr. Kidd and Mrs. Pearce are speaking another language.

After a while of dangerous investigating (for instance, sneaking into Mrs. Pearce's attic), Charlie and Jimbo are approached by a man in a suit at a restaurant who tells them to leave their teachers alone and then promptly burns a hole through the table they are sitting at with his finger. They disobey his order, however, and Charlie is kidnapped and taken to the Sagittarius Dwarf Elliptical Galaxy, where he has to fake happiness or else face certain death.

After investigating Charlie's "Spudvetch!" notebook (their secret notebook for gathering information), Jimbo discovers that his best bet to find Charlie would be on the Isle Of Skye, in Scotland. He convinces Becky to come with him, and after eventually arriving they find a mysterious portal which opens inside an abandoned shack. Jimbo gets sucked into Sagittarius Dwarf Elliptical Galaxy, but his sister stayed on Earth, unaware. He found Charlie but the man from the restaurant discovers them and Charlie's fake happiness and imprisons them. After a couple of days, the man releases them only to enslave them into bringing back escaped teachers or face death. They make it out only to discover that Becky has been holding the teachers hostage. The man confronts Charlie and Jimbo, but Becky neutralizes him and all three of them manage to defeat and destroy the man.

Mr. Kidd and Mrs. Pearce are fired from the school as a result of the kidnapping. They seek revenge on Charlie and try to kill him. Luckily, the FBI already knew what was going on and are watching them. They shoot the teachers and tell the children that if they ever tell anyone about Mr. Kidd and Mrs. Pearce, they would be hunted down and killed. Charlie and Jimbo return to their normal lives.

== Publishing history ==
Gridzbi Spudvetch! was published in 1993 by Walker Books. As mentioned in Boom!, Gridzbi Spudvetch had many faults. Mark Haddon admitted that 'no one could pronounce the title and know what the story was about until they read it', and also mentioned that the book was 'full of references to floppy disks, cassette players and Walkmans'. The book went rapidly out of print.

The book would have stayed out of print, but over the years several people commented about how much they loved the book. Alison Williams, the teacher of Lilac 4 from SS Philip and James Primary School in Oxford, said she had been reading the book to her children and how much they loved it. To prove this she sent letters from the children to Mark Haddon. With some inspiration Mark Haddon made a new edition, which was published in 2009 under the title Boom!. The book is dedicated to them.
