= La Ligne droite =

- Theatrical release poster
- Directed by: Régis Wargnier
- Written by: Régis Wargnier; Edwin Kruger
- Produced by: Jean Cottin
- Starring: Rachida Brakni; Cyril Descours; Clémentine Célarié; Seydina Balde
- Cinematography: Laurent Dailland
- Edited by: Simon Jacquet
- Music by: Patrick Doyle
- Production companies: Gaumont; France 2 Cinéma; Canal+
- Distributed by: Gaumont
- Release date: 9 March 2011
- Running time: 98 minutes
- Country: France
- Language: French
- Budget: $6 million
- Box office: $786.000

La Ligne droite (English: The Straight Line) is a 2011 French drama film co-written and directed by Régis Wargnier which focuses on the sport of blind running. It stars Rachida Brakni, Cyril Descours, Clémentine Célarié, and Seydina Baldé. The film was given a limited release on 9 March 2011.

== Cast ==
- Rachida Brakni as Leïla
- Cyril Descours as Yannick
- Clémentine Célarié as Marie-Claude
- Seydina Baldé as Franck
- Thierry Godard as Jacques
- Grégory Gadebois as Vincent
- Trésor Makunda as Martial
- Aladji Ba as Aladji
- Romain Goupil as teacher

== Synopsis ==
Leaving prison after five years, Leïla meets a young track athlete Yannick, who has only recently lost his sight in a car accident. He had been 400m relay runner but now has to race attached to another runner, his 'guide'. As Leïla had been an elite athlete before she went to jail, hiding her recent past, she returns to a sports centre where Yannick proposes that she becomes his guide. Yannick struggles to adjust to his situation, but the training and race preparations help both of them to rebuild their lives.

In the 'Making-of' feature which accompanies the DVD issue, Wargnier and the two principal actors describe how the final scenes had to be changed and re-written due an injury sustained by Brakni during filming. Originally it was Leïla who would guide Yannick in the culminating championship race, but the plot was changed so that Franck guides Yannick in his victory, while Leïla watches from the stands. Descours comments that when after winning Yannick says to Leïla that he did it for her, he and the rest of the crew also did it for Rachida.

== Filming ==
The actors trained alongside members of the French athletics squad and were filmed in front of 50,000 people during the Meeting Areva. One scene was shot at the ship cemetery of Landévennec (Finistère).

== Soundtrack ==
The critically acclaimed soundtrack for La Ligne droite was composed and conducted by Patrick Doyle, much in the minimalist style of composer Philip Glass. Due to a limited budget, Doyle composed the score using only ten members of the London Symphony Orchestra performing the various string, harp, and piano parts, recording them at close distances from the microphones for a larger sound.

The score was well received by critics. Christian Clemmensen, reviewer of Filmtracks.com, gave Doyle's music a glowing five-star review, stating, "This is the twentieth review of a Doyle score at Filmtracks since 1996, and after awarding the composer four stars on more than a dozen occasions, La Ligne Droite finally transcends to receive that fifth star. Given the high quality of those many four-star scores, you should need no further evidence that this hidden gem is worth your time and money." The soundtrack was released 8 March 2011 through Varèse Sarabande records and features twenty-two tracks of score at a running time of forty minutes.

== Reception ==
Variety wrote the film a positive review, praising the screenplay, direction, and performances by the two leads. He noted Brakni's athletic background, making her "absolutely credible" and "an equally physical performance" from Descours who showed "the anger and rage that make Yannick not only a firebrand but also a fighter and, potentially, a winner". As the supporting cast involved actual blind runners and their guides this revealed "how convincing Brakni and Descours are".

== See also ==
- Cinema of France
