= A Spot of Bother (2010 film) =

- Film poster
- French: Une petite zone de turbulences
- Directed by: Alfred Lot
- Written by: Michel Blanc; Alfred Lot
- Based on: Mark Haddon's A Spot of Bother
- Produced by: Yves Marmion
- Starring: Michel Blanc; Miou-Miou; Mélanie Doutey; Gilles Lellouche; Cyril Descours
- Cinematography: Pierre Aïm
- Edited by: Luc Barnier
- Music by: Nathaniel Méchaly
- Production companies: Mercury Film Productions; TF1 Films Production; Canal+ TPS Star
- Distributed by: UGC Fox Distribution
- Release date: 13 January 2010
- Running time: 108 minutes
- Country: France
- Language: French

A Spot of Bother (French: Une petite zone de turbulences) (A small area of turbulence), is a French comedy drama film directed by Alfred Lot and starring Michel Blanc, released in 2010, and based on the 2006 novel by the English writer Mark Haddon A Spot of Bother. It concerns the family crisis of a hypochondriac middle-aged man, his wife and grown-up children.

== Synopsis ==
Jean-Paul Muret, who has recently taken retirement, is also a hypochondriac. He and his wife, Anne, live in a fine house outside Paris where he busies himself building a shed in the large grounds. However, Anne is having an affair with one of his former colleagues, David. Jean-Paul and Anne's children are Cathie, who is divorced with a five-year-old son and lives with Philippe who runs a small business of bouncers but has been named "Bac moins six" ("IQ minus 10") by Mathieu, the gay son who is in a relationship with Olivier. When Jean-Paul witnesses his wife's infidelity the family equilibrium implodes into disputes, insults and settling of accounts.

One day, in a changing-room while buying a new suit, Jean-Paul finds a spot on his hip, and although reassured by his doctor that it is just discoid eczema, he panics and believes he has skin cancer. At the same time he learns that Cathie and Philippe plan to marry and is unable to mask his disapproval. Mathieu is reluctant to bring his partner Olivier to the wedding, which leads the latter to break up. Philippe begins to doubt his worth, the marriage, and whether Cathie loves him.

Claiming to need a change of air, Jean-Paul decides to visit his brother (whom he can't stand) but abandons his trip and returns home, and, without being noticed, catches Anne and David having sex in the marital bed, and from then on behaves more and more strangely. Jean-Paul goes to a psychiatrist, but afterwards decides to remove the 'cancer' himself with scissors, ending up in hospital. Family arguments ensue. Eventually Cathie and Philippe reconcile and the marriage plans go ahead, but on the day Jean-Paul takes the wrong doses of his medicines, and tries to avoid the ceremony. Olivier turns up during the reception, but Jean-Paul then makes a depressing speech, after which he attacks David, whom he had long before invited to the reception. Calm is eventually restored and with the three couples seemingly reunited, Jean-Paul and Anne look for some way forward.

== Cast ==
- Michel Blanc : Jean-Paul Muret
- Miou-Miou : Anne Muret
- Mélanie Doutey : Cathie Muret
- Gilles Lellouche : Philippe Faure
- Cyril Descours : Mathieu Muret
- Wladimir Yordanoff : David
- Yannick Renier : Olivier
- Éric Caravaca : Fabien, the first husband of Cathie
- Jolhan Martin : Hugo, Cathie and Fabien's son
- Nathalie Richard : Psychiatrist
- Marie-Christine Orry : Aunt Lucie
- Dominique Parent : Uncle Alain
- Jean-Yves Chatelais : Dr Bargouthian

== Production ==
=== Background ===
Haddon's second novel A Spot of Bother was published in 2006 and shortlisted for the 2006 Costa Novel Award. It deals with events in the life of a 57-year-old early retired man who finds a lesion on his hip, and despite reassurance from his doctor, transforms the spot into a malignant skin cancer, and what happens as he tries remain sane; "the novel moves in and out of the lives and minds of George’s wife, son, and daughter". The plot describes the "messy ordinariness of our lives, lives that revolve not around epic quests of historical significance, but marriages and divorces, love and sex, births and deaths". The book was translated into French in 2007 by Odile Demange as Une situation légèrement délicate (A slightly delicate position).

Yves Marmion, a producer at UGC, tried to get the actor Michel Blanc back into directing by sending him Haddon's book, which Blanc liked, especially its mix of genres, situations "that start gradually degenerating as the characters find themselves sucked into bottomless pits of trouble". However, as there were similarities to the previous film he had directed, Summer Things (Embrassez qui vous voudrez) he declined to direct the new film, while nonetheless preparing a film scenario from it. He wrote five different versions, and Alfred Lot revised the final draft to create the shooting script. When Blanc turned down the direction, Marmion approached Lot, who agreed to direct, and reduced Blanc's two hour and forty minute adaptation, concentrating more on the central character. He and Blanc also decided that there would not be any "easy laughs, that we wouldn’t force the structure. The situations and dialogue were either funny in themselves, or not!".

The book's plot outline and character relations are retained in the film, but the action is moved from Peterborough and London in England to Paris and the surrounding Île-de-France region. George and Jean Hall become Jean-Paul and Anne Muret, Katie and Ray become Cathie and Philippe, and Jamie and Tony become Mathieu and Olivier. Blanc saw in the plot elements of an "English caste system" but translated this for France, into a wish by Jean-Paul and Anne for their daughter to marry well. The working-class Ray in Haddon becomes Philippe, a security guard, involved in a "world that might seem foreign to these people". Philippe "hides behind preformulated phrases" but proves he is "more worthy than he appears to be" in his two scenes with Mathieu.

The acid and cynical script of the comedy complement the distracted characters. Several of the principal actors emphasize the theme of commitment in the film, and the "funny ways of showing how confused human beings are when faced with commitment". Doutey commented that all the main characters are scared by commitment, except for Philippe.

Just as Mathieu compartmentalizes his life, Miou-Miou observed that the family name 'Muret' ('little wall' in French) could refer to "the wall Jean-Paul builds or to the family’s character as a whole", and their problem in responding to love, and making a commitment. Descours noted that also the film "speaks about the generation gap... Jean-Paul and Anne have stagnated in their beautiful house. The kids are trying to find love and their parents are trying to get it back". Much of the comedy comes from the inability of each of the family to communicate with one another, leading to the 'turbulences'.

=== Filming ===
A Spot of Bother had a budget of €9.88 million, including pre-sales from Canal + and Ciné Cinéma, €2m from TF1 Films Production and €488,000 from the Île-de-France region. The shoot took nine weeks, from 4 March to mid May 2009. Lot chose CinemaScope as the principal film medium as he was aiming for a "chic and elegant" feel, in keeping with the dysfunctional upper-middle-class family; although he had planned to use a hand-held camera more, he decided on lots of dolly shots, which he felt fitted the spirit of the film. The house of Anne and Jean-Paul used for the film was located twenty minutes south of Paris, which had an ideal layout, with a large sloping garden and a pond next to which Jean-Paul might build his shed, as well as a lot of possibilities for the interior scenes. Other locations were in Paris, Essonne (Verrières-le-Buisson, Corbreuse), Hauts-de-Seine (Antony), Seine-et-Marne (Villeneuve-le-Comte), Val-de-Marne (Vincennes), Yvelines (Versailles-Chantiers station, Sainte-Mesme).

== Release ==
The film was released in France and Belgium on 13 January 2010. According to the Lumiere website, there were nearly 550,000 cinema admissions to see it in Europe. A DVD of the film was published in 2010 by UGC, including a Making of... documentary (entitled Vous entrez dans une zone de turbulences), and interviews with both Blanc and Lot (entitled Regards Croisés). A DVD issued in Canada appears to use an English variant title 3/4 life crisis.
