= Agent Z =

Fictional character

Agent Z is a code name used in a series of four children's books written by British author Mark Haddon, best known for his 2003 novel The Curious Incident of the Dog in the Night-time. In the first published versions of the books, Haddon also did the artwork for the covers and a number of illustrations inside (the cover pictures were changed for later editions). The Agent Z series is set in the present day in an unnamed British town.

- Agent Z Meets the Masked Crusader (1993)
- Agent Z Goes Wild (1994)
- Agent Z and the Penguin from Mars (1995)
- Agent Z and the Killer Bananas (2001)

Agent Z is not an actual living person in the books but a 'front' used by three schoolboys, Ben, Barney and Jenks, who have been friends for years, and who also call themselves the Crane Grove Crew. The mission of Agent Z is to wreak havoc on the unsuspecting and the deserving in a battle against boredom. The missions take the form of practical jokes, and with the culprits usually leaving a Z mark (like Zorro) on the scene of the prank. The Crane Grove Crew have their own secret base in a boarded-up, derelict park-keeper's cottage on the edge of the park near where they live. With a few exceptions that emerge in the stories, no-one knows of the identity of Agent Z, and the boys say they have made a pledge of secrecy never to reveal the identity of Agent Z.

In 1996 Agent Z and the Penguin from Mars was adapted for television by the BBC.

== Main characters ==
The three main characters are 12-year-old boys.

- Ben Simpson, the only child of Trevor and Jane Simpson, living in Crane Grove. The 'handsome' one of the Crew. Ben is always day-dreaming, and the adventure stories are interspersed with Ben's wild fantasies. He says that his mum reckons that his "fertile imagination" is an indication that he'll grow up to be a writer or artist.
- Barney Hall, an only son, living with his parents. Overweight, the brains of the crew, treated by teachers with respect due to his intellect. Has the ability to wrap adults around his little finger by means of flattery, saying things like "How's the new Escort, Mr Lanchester? I hear the ABS braking system works like a dream" – and they'd lap it up.
- Ian "Jenks" Jenkinson, with so many brothers and sisters that one can't remember how many there are. In Ben's estimate, "a total prat most of the time… sometimes hilarious, sometimes a complete wind-up… he looks like a rat… he moves like a rat." In the teacher Mr. Lanchester's estimate: "If his brain was dynamite, there wouldn't be enough to blow his head off."

== Secondary characters ==
- Trevor Simpson, Ben's dad; a practical sort; confesses to having been a bully in his school years; relieves his boredom by listening to Elvis Presley and Rock 'n' Roll music in a shed at the bottom of the garden, and attends Rock 'n' Roll nights at the local pub.
- Jane Simpson, Ben's mum, relieves her boredom by watching TV soap-operas, eating chocolate liqueurs, and attending night classes at various times in various subjects: Life-drawing, history, Spanish, Turkish… The brains and disciplinarian of the family.
- Fisty Morgan, the school bully, "shaving already at the age of 8”, bullies children out of their lunch money, lets everyone know that his father is in prison and that he comes from a rough neighbourhood. He stays clear of the Crew ever since he found out that they found out that he in fact comes from a wealthy family, lives in a smart house and that he is mollycoddled by his parents, his mother calling him 'poppit'.
- Mrs. Block, the headmistress at the school attended by the members of the Crew; known by everyone as 'Breezeblock'.
- Badger, the Simpson family dog, an Old English Sheepdog, already very old, deaf, half-bald and with breath that smells of rotting Brussels sprouts.

== A selection of the practical jokes unleashed by Agent Z ==
The Crane Grove Crew keep a record of their practical jokes on a wall in their Command Centre. They also rate each one on a scale of 1 to 10 in accordance with the criteria 'Daring', 'Success' and 'Laugh Value'. The only clues to the nature of the operations are the Z stickers left at the scene of each attack. Among their many practical jokes:

- Placing cling-film over the toilet seats in the boys' toilets at school and at the same time putting black shoe polish on the black-coloured toilet seats. Accidental victim: Fisty Morgan.
- Sneaking into the school kitchen and pouring a bumper pack of black plastic tarantulas into the gravy.
- Leaving a huge parcel for science teacher Mrs. Phelps, which she unwraps to find another parcel inside that… and eventually after 33 layers she comes across a matchbox, inside which is tissue paper and inside that is a folded square of paper within which is a tiny label attached to a piece of cotton with a knot on the end; in miniature writing are the words "AN ATOM".
- Attaching kippers to the underside of the car of their teacher Mr. Forsyth in revenge for him disciplining them by making them clear his garden one Saturday. The result, the fish smell penetrates the whole car and Mr. Forsyth's clothing.
- Managing to persuade Ben's neighbour that he has been visited by space aliens.

== Agent Z secret code language ==
The Crane Grove Crew use a secret code language known as Pig Latin, which involves simply shifting the first letter from every word and then adding that letter to a suffix 'ay' that follows the word: Thus, the word 'Ready' becomes 'Eady-ray'; 'Done' becomes 'One-day' and 'Yes' becomes 'Es-yay', etc.

== Summaries of the Agent Z books ==
=== Agent Z Meets the Masked Crusader (1993) ===
Book cover for Agent Z Meets the Masked Crusader

Barney, Ben and Jenks are already mates, the 'crew', but it seems as if Barney and Jenks are keeping something from Ben. How come, when he went to change back into his shoes after football his shoes were all of a sudden too small, but there was a Z carved in the bottom of them, and how did worms get into the bottom of his bed? No point asking. So next time Ben turns up at the Command Centre he has a box of chocolates with him, something he knows the others can't resist; only it turns out that some of them are filled with mustard – and the box lid is marked with a Z. Ben has got revenge, and in doing so is welcomed as a new Agent Z member. So Agent Z starts playing pranks at school, but one of the victims is Fisty Morgan, the school bully. At first he doesn't suspect Ben, Barney and Jenks, until that is he discovers an Agent Z badge under the Jencks' jacket lapel. The brawl is broken up by new teacher Mr. Forsyth. It materialises that Fisty has been extorting money from other children. He ends up getting suspended from school. But Mr. Forsyth wishes to teach Ben, Barney and Jencks a lesson too; and thus gets them to clear his garden at the weekend. But they get revenge, by fixing kippers to the underside of his car; he and the car end up reeking of fish. But the glorious victory is short-lived when someone calling himself the Masked Crusader appears one evening from nowhere at their command centre. After an initial panic the boys manage to lock him in, only for him to escape through a window, and hobbles off. Next day Mr Forsyth has a noticeable limp. He surely is the Masked Crusader. They offer to call a truce and give him an Agent Z badge, as an "honorary" member of the crew.

=== Agent Z Goes Wild (1994) ===
Book cover for Agent Z Goes Wild

The school year comes to an end and the summer holidays are about to begin. Ben manages to avoid going on holiday with his parents and instead joins Barney and Jenks and a bunch of other kids on an outdoor adventure holiday in Wales organised by the school. On arrival, they realise it is hardly going to be a holiday, with a sadistic camp instructor – whom they call Grenade-Head – and lousy food, weather and facilities. A couple of snotty public school kids are present are a pain, but there is an exception in a girl, Roz Winters, with partly shaved head and pierced nose, who picks up on and praises the boys' humour. But the holiday takes a turn when Roz mentions the strange locked room in the centre. The boys pull off a daring commando-like raid on the room, and discover a briefcase containing copies of paper-clippings, which show that the head of the centre is in fact a wanted dangerous criminal, They dispose of the case and papers, retaining 'evidence' about a supposed midnight rendezvous at a nearby ruined monastery the following Friday. The following evening they even see Morse-code messages being flashed by torch across the nearby lake confirming the meeting. The holiday is due to finish at the end of the week, with a big trek. Only Ben and Barney venture out in the night to the ruins to try to find out who is due to meet who. On arrival they soon hear the voice of Grenade-Head, followed by singing… and the appearance of Roz. It turns out the voice and singing was all on tape, and the whole set up was a prank played by Roz on the boys. She had been coming to the centre for years, and always playing pranks on others – this was her best yet. The boys congratulate her...until Jenks falls into a canyon breaking his leg.

=== Agent Z and the Penguin from Mars (1995) ===
Cover for Agent Z and the Penguin From Mars

Ben and his family have new neighbours: Dennis and Patricia Sidebottom, and their two children Tod (12) and Samantha (11); and they turn up on the Simpson family doorstep to introduce themselves. They are squeaky clean, and the quiet children study hard and practise music two hours a day. In Ben's words "They looked like a photograph from Mum's Country Casuals mail-order catalogue". Dennis Sidebottom then lets on that they have recently won three million pounds on the pools. Mr. Sidebottom's expensive hobby is star-gazing through a massive telescope, built in the conservatory. Barney gives Ben a Crane Grove Crew mission to find out about Tod. But Tod turns out to be a 'liability'; while with Ben in a record store he steals 5 identical copies of a Dolly Parton CD. Just as Ben orders him to put them back they both get nabbed for the theft. The Sidebottoms now regard Ben as a bad influence on Tod. And then Dennis Sidebottom turns up unexpectedly at the Command Centre; having seen the Crew's display of Agent, threatens that they will stay away from his son or he will report their goings-on in the derelict cottage. So how will Agent Z get revenge? By an elaborate hoax, which involves stealing a penguin from the zoo, and dressing it up in foil, a dry-ice machine, a huge barrage balloon, and (at great expense) slice of meteorite inscribed with 'alien lettering'. Late one night the Crew spring the trap and Sidebotton falls for the prank, believing space aliens have landed. The prank backfires on the Crew when it seems the whole world believes that aliens did indeed land – especially as experts verify that the stone on which the text is carved is certainly from outer space. Things are only resolved when a person in Australia sees Mr Sidebottom's face on TV, and identifies him as the person who robbed a casino some years previously. So it seems that the Sidebottoms hadn't won the pools after all. And the cryptic text? When deciphered it reads: "Dennis Sidebottom is a pompous Wazzock".

=== Agent Z and the Killer Bananas (2001) ===
Book cover for Agent Z and the Killer Bananas

The Simpson family get a postcard from Ben's father's sister Trish and her husband Harry: they are on holidays on the Pacific Island of Talula. But a few days later a volcano erupts there, and the Simpsons receive a telegram saying they are stuck there. And thus their son, TJ, a few years older than Ben, turns up on their door wanting to be put up until his parents return. But TJ is a nasty piece of work: and rather than share his bedroom with his cousin, Ben moves to the garden shed. Ben's parents are also exasperated by TJ's arrogance, and his Dad even modifies a dartboard to include a picture of TJ with the text 'DIE, TJ, DIE' and 'SO LONG, SCUMBAG'. But TJ then discovers a video-tape in Ben's room, a film made on Barney's new camcorder, of Agent Z pranks – in particular a prank where their teacher Mrs Block gets accosted in the shopping centre. TJ starts to blackmail Ben – he takes some of his money, total use of Ben's new bike, having to serve him snacks and even calling him 'Sir'. The Crane Grove Crew devise a plan of revenge: to make a film "The Invasion of the Killer Bananas", in which using montage techniques they will show TJ being killed by the bananas. When TJ discovers the dartboard, he confronts Ben telling him he will make his life a living hell. TJ then goes missing, and the police are called. The evidence of the dartboard and video point to Ben, Barney and Jenks having killed TJ – and the plodding police pursue that line of inquiry. The Crew then set out to find TJ, which they do, camping in a forest. But how are they going to not only turn him in, but also humiliate him at the same time? They take the risk of turning up at his camp site to tell him that he is being searched by the police for breaking into Mrs. Block's house; after initial scepticism, TJ buys the story, as well as the 'escape plan' to dress him up in women's clothing. They lead him to Ben's house where they know the police are waiting. TJ escapes on a pizza deliveryman's moped, and a long chase ensues, but TJ is finally captured.

== Haddon on the experience of writing the Agent Z books ==
=== Agent Z Meets the Masked Crusader (1993) ===
"Some of the practical jokes played by Ben, Barney and Jenks were practical jokes I played at school with (and on) my friends. Some were practical jokes played by my grandfather, who went in for that sort of thing. He once paused in front of a post box in the centre of Northampton and began speaking into the slot. 'Well, how on earth did you get in there...? Are you all right...? I'm sorry, I can't, but someone must have a key..." and so on and so forth. Pretty soon a large crowd had gathered intrigued by this poor idiot who had got themselves locked inside a post box. At which point my grandfather wandered off to get help..."

=== Agent Z Goes Wild (1994) ===
"Most of this story is set in Snowdonia. If I remember correctly I went there first with the school cadet corps when I was fifteen. The teachers in charge had trim beards and sinewy thighs and wanted us to do abseiling and ridge-walks. The boys were simply waiting for the evening when they could slip away to nearest village, go to a pub and drink enough to make themselves violently sick. I probably wanted to be at home with a book about the evolution of fossil man. I was that kind of child."

=== Agent Z and the Penguin from Mars (1995) ===
"The two lasting things I got from the experience were a) a plastic meteorite and b) a friendship with the producer, Marilyn Fox, which kick-started my script-writing career."

=== Agent Z and the Killer Bananas (2001) ===
" The fourth book in the Agent Z series and one of the hardest books I've ever had to write. Doubtless there are many authors out there who enjoy nothing better than returning to the same characters and the same setting time and time again. But the idea of writing something 'exactly the same but different' fills me with horror. I remember moaning to my editor at the time, 'There's only a limited number of plots in the world and I've already used both of them'. To make matters worse I had to write and illustrate the book at a ridiculously high speed before moving to Boston, MA. This was 1995, very few people had e-mail, scanners were restricted to the higher echelons of NASA and I assumed that working on an illustrated book from the other side of the Atlantic would be like working on an illustrated book from a nearby solar system. Predictably, soon after I delivered the final draft I discovered that the publication was being indefinitely postponed due to the meagre sales of the previous Agent Z books. The Killer Bananas didn't see the light of day till five years later. There's a lesson there. And I do like the illustrations. If it's not impolite for me to say so. That sea creature emerging from a toilet gives me a little glow every time I look at it."

== Agent Z and British culture ==
The Agent Z books are set in Britain, and the language and cultural references make no allowances for readers in other countries.

A selection of references to British culture in the Agent Z books: Sainsbury's; Tescos; the Co-op; Arsenal; The Brownies; "knocked for six"; "playing Oranges and Lemons"; "half-chewed Penguin"; "robbing Barclays"; Horse of the Year Show; "sent back to Dartmoor"; "FA Cup Final"; "Match of the Day"; ICI; Max Bygraves.
