= Mystère au Louvre =

2017 French television film

Mystère au Louvre is a 2017 French TV film, fourth in the Mystère à... series of television films (2011 to 2018) set in the Paris of the Belle Époque. It concerns a fictional robbery at the Louvre museum in the 1880s. It was written by Elsa Marpeau and Florent Meyer and directed by Léa Fazer, and stars Alice Taglioni, Philippe Torreton and Cyril Descours. The heroine is "both a manipulator and manipulated, a thief, disguised as a young man, a woman of the world, fragile and strong".

== Plot ==
The most infamous burglar in Paris - Mercure - is in fact a woman, Constance de Coulanges, an outsider to high society who, partly to revenge the murder of her love Pierre two years previously in an attempted burglary, and to thwart the ruthless head of security at the Louvre, Inspector Thénard, plots to steal crown jewels from the museum. To this end, disguised as a man, she recruits an innocent circus performer Frédéric, able to do tight-rope walking and other stunts. However, since the failed theft Thénard has doubled security and installed a fatal high-voltage ring around the crown jewels display, making the endeavour almost impossible. To pull off a masterstroke of stealing the jewels that had belonged to Empress Eugénie she also has to gain the attentions and confidence of the director, Alfred de Longeville, while overcoming the suspicions of Frédéric, the protector of his blind younger sister and with no experience in criminal activity, and to keep the identity of Mercure secret.

== Cast ==
- Alice Taglioni as Constance de Coulanges / Mercure
- Philippe Torreton as Thénard, chief of police at the Louvre
- Cyril Descours as Frédéric Delage
- Nicolas Marié as Alfred de Longeville, director of the Louvre
- Eriq Ebouaney as Vladimir, Constance's manservant
- Andy Gillet as Pierre Gamblin
- Alice de Germay de Cirfontaine as Lulu, sister of Delage
- Michaël Vander-Meiren as Marcel, a professional burglar
- Guillaume Bouchède as Paul Verlaine
- Erik Stouvenaker as Joris Karl Huysmans
- Emmanuel Joucla as the Duc de Morsauf
- Emmanuel Barrouyer as the Marquis
- Thierry Nenez as the shoe-maker
- Raphaël Magnabosco as a museum employee
- Claudine Acs as the Baronne

== Production ==
Alice Taglioni had already appeared in two of Fazer's films, Notre univers impitoyable (2008), and Cookie (2012). The film was a co-production of Production AKCB, France Télévisions Distribution, Noon, and Thalie Images. This was the third of four Mystère à... telefilms directed by Fazer.

=== Filming ===
According to the final credits some filming took place at the Musée du Louvre itself, as well as the Château de Fontainebleau, and the Domaine de Courson.

The original music for the film is by composer François Castello, who also wrote the soundtracks for Mystère au Moulin Rouge (2011) and Mystère à la Tour Eiffel (2015). The soundtrack includes the recording of the tenor air "Je crois entendre encore" sung by Alain Vanzo with the Orchestre Radio-Lyrique conducted by Manuel Rosenthal, in 1959.

== Reception ==
The programme was watched by an estimated 4.4 million people on its initial broadcast on France 2 on 27 December 2017, equivalent to 19.2% of those watching French television at that time and the most watched programme that evening. The film was repeated on 1 December 2025 on the T18 channel, followed by a panel discussion chaired by Ava Djamshidi about the theft of 19 October 2025 at the Louvre.

One critic noted that the plot involved "mystery, elegance and suspense, fully exploiting the prestigious setting of the Louvre, whose galleries, treasures and security devices become the centerpieces of a narrative", and that "[b]etween seduction, cunning and permanent danger, Mystère au Louvre explores the shadows of the criminal genius while offering a refined thriller in the heart of the most famous museum in the world.
