= The Talking Horse and the Sad Girl and the Village Under the Sea =

2005 poetry collection by Mark Haddon

First edition (publ. Picador)

The Talking Horse and the Sad Girl and the Village Under the Sea is a collection of poetry by Mark Haddon published in 2005.
