= A Spot of Bother =

2006 novel by Mark Haddon

- First edition (UK)
- Author: Mark Haddon
- Language: English
- Genre: Mortality; Psychology
- Publisher: Jonathan Cape (UK); Doubleday (US)
- Publication date: 31 August 2006
- Publication place: United Kingdom
- Media type: Print
- Pages: 400
- ISBN: 0-224-08046-6
- OCLC: 69124422
- Preceded by: The Curious Incident of the Dog in the Night-Time

A Spot of Bother is the second adult novel by Mark Haddon, who is best known for his prize-winning first novel The Curious Incident of the Dog in the Night-Time. Like Curious Incident, A Spot of Bother examines mental health issues from the perspective of the patient.

An excerpt from A Spot of Bother (at that point titled Blood and Scissors) was published in the book New Beginnings, the proceeds from which were donated to the victims of the 2004 Indian Ocean earthquake.

The book was adapted by Michel Blanc into a French film in 2009 (Une petite zone de turbulences).

== Plot ==
The novel follows George Hall, a 57-year-old hypochondriac, and his family following George's retirement from a career manufacturing playground equipment. George has hypochondria, an excessive phobia for one's physical health. Certain that a skin lesion on his hip is a fatal cancer, George rejects Dr Barghoutian's diagnosis of eczema due to his previous misdiagnosis of his daughter Katie's appendicitis as stomach ache, and unsuccessfully attempts to remove the lesion with a pair of scissors. The resulting blood loss soon renders him unconscious, but not before he calls an ambulance and tries to get a chisel from the cellar to demarcate the incident as accidental. The resulting bloodied handprints he smears around the house in doing so horrify his wife Jean.

George and Jean's children confront problems of their own. Katie, a single mother, announces her plans to marry Ray, a competent but lower-class man of whom George, Jean, and their son Jamie disapprove. As the story progresses Ray worries that Katie wants to be with him only for his house and so he can act as a father to her five-year-old son Jacob. It is only when Katie visits George in the hospital that she realises she and Ray are meant to be together: she proposes to Ray herself, and the couple rearrange the wedding. Meanwhile, Jamie has an uneasy relationship with his boyfriend Tony. When Jamie fails to pass on to Tony an invitation to Katie's wedding, arguing about how he would not enjoy it, Tony leaves him.

George begins to suffer from extreme panic attacks. He is said to have wires ripped out of his head whilst observing a deer being killed on a TV discovery channel. And his mental state is exacerbated not only by the anxiety of his daughter's wedding but also due to his walking in (unseen) on Jean having sexual intercourse with David, a former colleague, in his bed. Thereafter, George is delineated as frequently thinking about how he has wasted his life, and the notion of death starts to terrify him. Despite being told by Jamie to not give a speech at Katie's wedding, George decides to give one after deliberating that he may never get the chance to speak to a large crowd ever again. He exclaims how little time people have to value their lives, and divulges into his incredulity of how only he alone seems to see this fact. His words are met with a few uneasy laughs but mostly silence. At the end of his speech, despite having taken a few pills of Valium to calm him down, he notices that David is present. George launches himself at the man, drawing blood and forcing him to leave the wedding.

Jean thus finds out that George knows about her and David. George tells Jean that he was out of order, and even though he is deeply upset at her disloyalty, he explains that things would simply be too painful for them to break up after years of living together. Jean agrees, and sadly acknowledges that her love affair is over, and effectively her sex life too. The following morning, George walks downstairs and meets Tony, who reunited with Jamie after Jamie sent him a letter of his feelings. George realises that there is nothing wrong with homosexuals as long as they kept it clean, and furthermore, after reading an article about an upcoming surgery for conjoined twins which could possibly result in both their deaths, that he should "stop all this nonsense". The others depart, leaving George and Jean to return to a comfortable atmosphere and an ordinary, settled household.

== Reception ==
The book received mixed reviews. Michael Dirda of The Washington Post called the book "superbly entertaining", adding "...half the time while reading A Spot of Bother you won't be sure whether to laugh or cry. Which is, I suppose, precisely the point." David Kamp of The New York Times wrote that the book "serves as a fine example of why novels exist."

Mindy Laube of Australian newspaper The Sydney Morning Herald was critical of the book, writing "while the characterisation can't be faulted, A Spot of Bother fails to fulfil its early promise. What initially shapes up as a disquietingly soft stab in the human heart turns obvious and formulaic. Haddon's examination of the contours of love is forensic in its insight but a sentimental undertow proves too alluring to resist." Patrick Ness of The Guardian criticised the book for being "unsurprising." It is, he writes, "never less than pleasurable to read and there are good jokes and funny situations; it's just that it never tries to be much more than good jokes or funny situations." Ness concludes his review by saying "It's not that this is a bad book – it isn't. It's amusing and brisk and charming. But readers could be forgiven for wanting – and expecting – more."
