= Mark Haddon =

English writer and illustrator (born 1962)

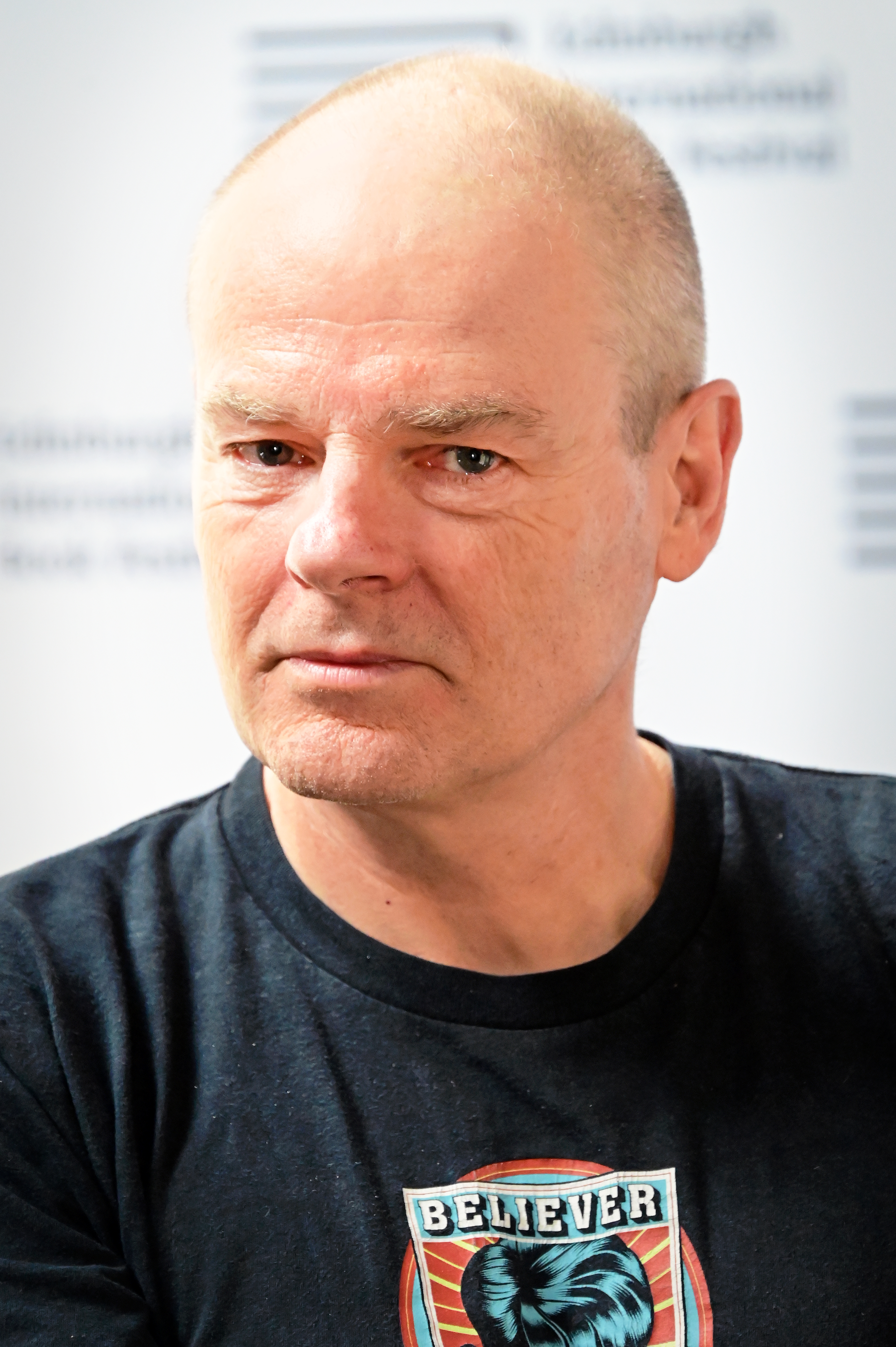
- Haddon in 2026
- Born: 28 October 1962 (age 64); Northampton, Northamptonshire, England
- Education: MA, English Literature, Edinburgh University; Merton College, Oxford; Uppingham School; Spratton Hall School
- Occupations: Writer, illustrator
- Spouse: Sos Eltis
- Children: 2
- Writing career
- Period: 1987–present
- Genres: Novels, children's literature, poetry, screenplays, radio drama
- Notable awards: Whitbread Book of the Year 2003; Guardian Prize 2003
- Website: markhaddon.com

Mark Haddon (born 28th October 1962, Northampton) is an English novelist, best known for The Curious Incident of the Dog in the Night-Time (2003). He has won the Whitbread Award, the Dolly Gray Children's Literature Award, the Guardian Prize, and a Commonwealth Writers' Prize for his work.

== Life, work and studies ==
Haddon and a sister grew up in Northampton with parents who, he said, "did not feel, or would not show, any love or affection". His father was an architect. He had "happy childhood memories" of staying with grandparents in Brighton. Haddon wrote a fragmentary memoir of his early life, Leaving Home, after suffering 'brain fog' from long Covid.

In 2003, Haddon won the Whitbread Book of the Year Award, in the Novels rather than Children's Books category, for The Curious Incident of the Dog in the Night-Time. He also won the Commonwealth Writers' Prize in the Best First Book category, as The Curious Incident was considered his first book written for adults. Despite it being categorized as an adult book for some awards, Haddon also won the Guardian Children's Fiction Prize in 2003 for the book. The Curious Incident was also long-listed for the 2003 Man Booker Prize. It was adapted as a stage play and had a long and successful run. It is second to War Horse as the National Theatre's most profitable production.

The Curious Incident was written from the perspective of a 15-year-old boy, Christopher John Francis Boone. In an interview at Powells.com, Haddon claimed that this was the first book that he wrote intentionally for an adult audience; he was surprised when his publisher suggested marketing it to both adult and child audiences (it has been very successful with adults and children alike). It has been criticised by some autistic readers, who objected to its 'depressing' depiction of Christopher, the autistic protagonist.

Haddon's short story The Pier Falls was long-listed for the 2015 Sunday Times EFG Private Bank Short Story Award, the richest prize in the world for a single short story. His novel The Porpoise, "a multi-layered re-imagining of Shakespeare's 'Pericles', was published in 2019, three weeks after heart surgery. Aged 63, after struggling with post-Covid "brain fog", he completed two more stories and in 2024 published a collection of short stories inspired by classical mythology called Dogs and Monsters. He was invited to contribute to an anthology of "very short stories inspired by postcards" for Redstone Press and, from "a stack of old postcards", wrote eleven vignettes. He eventually wrote more than 150 of these "micro-stories", which were collected under the title Fog & Pineapples, his "first substantial work of fiction for seven years". His agent and publisher were not convinced and said the stories were "too short, too diverse and lacking a connecting theme". Haddon sent them to The Observer newspaper, which published a selection in August 2026. After completing Fog & Pineapples he regained his strength and wrote two longer stories. He told The Observer, "I'd forgotten how profoundly enjoyable this experience is and how much I've missed it".

In 2023, he turned down an OBE for his services to literature, saying: 'I would feel uneasy accepting an honour which presumes an uncritical acceptance of the British Empire as a good thing.'

== Personal life ==
Haddon is a vegetarian. He described himself as a "hard-line atheist". He has "long been plagued by anxiety and depression". In 2019, he had triple heart bypass surgery. Later he contracted COVID-19 and, as he recovered, was diagnosed with long COVID. He has struggled with long Covid "brain fog" that left him unable to read or write. In 2024 he spoke to The Guardian about his five-year-long process of partial recovery, saying that although he still could not read properly, the fog was "starting to thin a little".

Haddon lives in Oxford in an "art and book-filled Victorian house" with his wife Sos Eltis, a Fellow of Brasenose College, Oxford, and their two sons.

== Works ==
=== For children ===
- Gilbert's Gobstopper (1987)
- Toni and the Tomato Soup (1988)
- A Narrow Escape for Princess Sharon (1989)
- Agent Z Meets the Masked Crusader (1993)
- Titch Johnson, Almost World Champion (1993)
- Agent Z Goes Wild (1994)
  - At Home
  - At Playgroup
  - In the Garden
  - On Holiday
- Gridzbi Spudvetch! (1992)
- The Real Porky Philips (1994)
- Agent Z and the Penguin from Mars (1995)
- The Sea of Tranquility (1996)
- Secret Agent Handbook
- Captain Agent Z and the Killer Bananas (2001)
- Ocean Star Express (2001)
- The Ice Bear's Cave (2002)
- The Curious Incident of the Dog in the Night-Time (2003)
- Boom! (An improved version of Gridzbi Spudvetch) (2009)

=== For adults ===
- The Curious Incident of the Dog in the Night-Time (2003)
- A Spot of Bother (2006)
- The Red House (2012)
- The Pier Falls (2016)
- The Porpoise (2019)
- Social Distance (graphic short story, 2020)
- Dogs and Monsters (2024)
- Leaving Home: A Memoir in Full Colour (2026)

=== Poetry ===
- The Talking Horse and the Sad Girl and the Village Under the Sea (2005)

=== Play ===
- Polar Bears (2010)
