= The Curious Incident of the Dog in the Night-Time =

2003 mystery novel by Mark Haddon

- Author: Mark Haddon
- Language: English
- Genre: Mystery novel
- Publisher: Jonathan Cape (UK); Doubleday (US); Anchor Canada (Canada)
- Publication date: 1 May 2003
- Publication place: United Kingdom
- Media type: Print (hardback and paperback)
- Pages: 274
- ISBN: 0-09-945025-9
- OCLC: 59267481

The Curious Incident of the Dog in the Night-Time is a 2003 mystery novel by English writer Mark Haddon. Haddon and The Curious Incident won the Whitbread Book Awards for Best Novel and Book of the Year, the Commonwealth Writers' Prize for Best First Book, and the Guardian Children's Fiction Prize.

Haddon considered this his first novel for adults, as his previous books were for children. Unusually, his publisher also released a separate edition for the children's market, and it was successful there.

The novel is narrated in first-person by Christopher John Francis Boone, a 15-year-old boy who is described as "a mathematician with some behavioural difficulties" living in Swindon, Wiltshire. Although Christopher's condition is not stated, the book's blurb refers to Asperger syndrome. Some commentators have characterized Christopher as on the autism spectrum.

In July 2009, Haddon wrote on his blog that "The Curious Incident is not a book about Asperger's ... if anything it's a novel about difference, about being an outsider, about seeing the world in a surprising and revealing way. The protagonist, being neuro-diverse shows that. The book is not specifically about any specific disorder". Haddon said that he is not an expert on the autism spectrum or Asperger's syndrome.

He chose to indicate chapters by prime numbers, rather than the conventional successive numbers, to express a different world view. Originally written in English, the book has been translated into 36 additional languages.

The book’s title is a line of Sherlock Holmes’ dialogue from the 1892 short story "The Adventure of Silver Blaze" by Sir Arthur Conan Doyle.

== Plot ==
In late 1998, Christopher John Francis Boone is a 15-year-old boy living in Swindon, England with his widowed father, Ed. One night, Christopher discovers that his neighbour Eileen Shears' dog, Wellington, has been fatally speared with a garden fork. As Christopher mourns over Wellington's body, Eileen calls the police. When a policeman grabs Christopher's arm, Christopher panics and hits him; he is subsequently arrested for assault, though he is quickly released with a caution. Christopher decides to investigate Wellington's death and chronicle his findings in a book, despite Ed's objections. During the investigation, he meets the elderly Mrs. Alexander, who informs Christopher that his late mother Judy was having an affair with Eileen's husband Roger.

Ed discovers the book and confiscates it. While searching Ed's room for the book, Christopher finds letters from Judy, dated after her supposed death. Eventually, he realizes that Judy is still alive and living in London with Roger. Finding a distressed Christopher in a catatonic state and realizing that he has discovered the letters, Ed admits to lying about Judy's death and confesses to killing Wellington in a fit of anger after an argument with Eileen. Fearing for his own safety, Christopher decides to run away and live with Judy.

After a long, event-filled journey, evading policemen and feeling overwhelmed by the trains and crowds around him, Christopher eventually finds his way to the home of Judy and Roger, much to the delight of the former and chagrin of the latter. Soon after arriving, Christopher requests to return to Swindon to take his mathematics A-level, but Judy contacts the school to postpone it. She and Roger later break up due to the latter's reluctance to accept Christopher. Judy subsequently returns to Swindon with Christopher, and the exam is reinstated.

After an argument, Judy agrees to let Ed see Christopher for brief daily visits. Christopher remains apprehensive of his father, hoping he will be imprisoned for killing Wellington. Ed gifts Christopher a puppy, whom Christopher names Sandy, and promises to gradually regain Christopher's trust. Christopher declares that he will take further exams and attend university. He completes his mathematics A-level with top grades. The book ends with Christopher optimistic about his future.

== Characters ==
Christopher John Francis Boone
The protagonist and narrator of the novel who investigates the murder of Mrs. Shears's dog Wellington while navigating the challenges of his disorder.
Ed Boone
Christopher's father, a boiler engineer. Up to the start of the story, Ed has been a single parent to Christopher for two years.
Judy Boone
Christopher's mother. Early in the book, Christopher writes that she died of a heart attack two years before the book's events. It is revealed later in the story that she actually did not have a heart attack and that was a lie made up by Ed Boone.
Toby
Christopher's pet rat who dies at the end of the book at the age of 2 years and 7 months old.
Wellington
Mrs. Shears's large black poodle, found dead in the night-time, speared with a garden fork.
Siobhan
Christopher's paraprofessional and mentor at school. She teaches him how society works and how to behave within its complex guidelines.
Eileen Shears
The owner of Wellington the dog; she consoled Ed and Christopher for a time after Christopher learns of his mother's death.
Roger Shears
Mrs. Shears's ex-husband and Judy Boone's lover.
Mrs. Alexander
An elderly neighbour who offers information to help Christopher's investigation regarding his parents and Mr. and Mrs. Shears.
Mr. Jeavons
Christopher's psychologist.
Rhodri
Ed Boone's employee.
Sandy
Christopher's Golden Retriever puppy that his dad buys for him at the end of the book as part of an effort to rebuild their relationship.
Reverend Peters
The invigilator at Christopher's mathematics exam.

== Themes ==
=== Social disability ===
In a 2004 interview, Haddon said

I have to say honestly that I did more research about the London Underground and the inside of Swindon Railway Station, where some of the novel takes place, than I did about Asperger's syndrome. I gave [Christopher] kind of 9 or 10 rules that he would live his life by, and then I didn't read any more about Asperger's because I think there is no typical person who has Asperger's syndrome, and they're as large and diverse a group of people as any other group in society. And the important thing is that I did a lot of imagining, that I did a lot of putting myself into his shoes in trying to make him come alive as a human being rather than getting him right, whatever that might mean.

Haddon states on his website that, although he had read "a handful of newspaper and magazine articles about, or by, people with Asperger's and autism" in preparation for writing the book, he knows "very little" about Asperger's syndrome and that Christopher Boone is inspired by two different people. According to Haddon, neither of these people can be labelled as having a disability. Haddon added that he "slightly regret[s]" that the term Asperger's syndrome appeared on the cover of his novel. In 2010, in an interview with The Independent, he was described as:

now thoroughly irritated that the word Asperger's appeared on subsequent editions of the novel, because now everyone imagines that he is an expert and he keeps getting phone calls asking him to appear at lectures.

In a critical essay on the novel, Vivienne Muller quotes some praise by experts on disability theory:

In its presentation of Christopher's everyday experiences of the society in which he lives, the narrative offers a rich canvas of experiences for an ethnographic study of this particular cognitive condition, and one which places a positive spin on the syndrome. The reader in this instance acts as ethnographer, invited to see what Mark Osteen claims is a 'quality in autistic lives that is valuable in and of itself'. Along similar lines, [Alex] McClimens writes that Haddon's novel is 'an ethnographic delight' and that 'Haddon's achievement is to have written a novel that turns on the central character's difference without making that difference a stigmatising characteristic.

Muller adds that the novel:

works with a strong sense of the disabled speaking subject, drawing readers into Christopher's cognitive / corporeal space through an incremental layering of his perspectives and reactions ... The narrative also bristles with diagrams, maps, drawings, stories, texts that inform Christopher's lexicon for mapping meaning in a world of bewildering signs and sounds.

She also admires such elements as:

the digressive stream-of-connectedness-and-disconnectedness way in which Christopher writes and thinks; the obsessive focus on minutiae; his musings about why animals behave the way they do; his quasi-philosophizing on death and life and the afterlife; his ambition to be an astronaut ...

In a survey of children's books which "teach about emotional life", Laura Jana wrote:

On the one hand, this is a story of how an undeniably quirky teenage boy clings to order, deals with a family crisis, and tries to make sense of the world as he sees it. But it also provides profound insight into a disorder – autism – that leaves those who have it struggling to perceive even the most basic of human emotions. In so doing, The Curious Incident leaves its readers with a greater appreciation of their own ability to feel, express, and interpret emotions. This mainstream literary success made its way to the top of The New York Times bestseller list for fiction at the same time it was being touted by experts in Asperger's syndrome and autism-spectrum disorders as an unrivaled fictional depiction of the inner workings of an autistic teenage boy.

=== Metaphor ===
Christopher often comments on his inability to understand or appreciate the concept of metaphors. He gives as an example a quote that he found in "a proper novel": "I am veined with iron, with silver, and with streaks of common mud. I cannot contract into the firm fist which those clench who do not depend on stimulus." Haddon told NPR journalist Terry Gross, "Funnily enough, it's actually a quote from Virginia Woolf. It's Virginia Woolf on an off day, in the middle, I think, of The Waves. An author whom I love actually, but who sometimes got a little too carried away."

=== Multimodality ===
The novel is developed in various semiotic modes or resources: maps, diagrams, pictures, as well as smileys, which are not ornamental but crucial to the understanding of the plot. This means that Haddon's novel can be conceived as multimodal.

== Reception ==
=== Awards ===
Awards for The Curious Incident of the Dog in the Night-Time
Year	Award	Result	Ref.
2003	Art Seidenbaum Award for First Fiction	Won	
2003	Book Trust Teenage Fiction Award	Won	
2003	Booker Prize	Longlisted	
2003	Guardian Children's Fiction Prize	Won	
2003	Whitbread Book of the Year	Won	
2004	Alex Awards	Top 10	
2004	Boeke Prize	Won	
2004	YALSA Best Books for Young Adults	Top 10	
2009	Outstanding Books for the College Bound and Lifelong Learners	Selection	

=== Critical response ===
A 2006 survey in Great Britain, conducted by the BBC's literacy campaign for World Book Day, found Curious Incident to be among "the top five happy endings, as voted on by readers" in novels (the others were Pride and Prejudice, To Kill a Mockingbird, Jane Eyre, and Rebecca, the last of which Curious outranked).

School Library Journal praised it as a "rich and poignant novel". The San Jose Mercury News said: "Haddon does something audacious here, and he does it superbly. He shows us the way consciousness orders the world, even when the world doesn't want to be ordered", adding that "the great achievement of this novel is that it transcends its obvious cleverness. It's more than an exercise in narrative ingenuity. Filled with humor and pain, it verges on profundity in its examination of those things—customs, habits, language, symbols, daily routines, etc.—that simultaneously unite and separate human beings." A reviewer for The Christian Century described it as "an absorbing, plausible book": "The reader becomes absorbed not only in the mystery of a murdered dog and a missing mom, but also in the mysterious world of an autistic child."

A reviewer for The Atlanta Journal-Constitution wrote that the story is "a touching evolution, one that Haddon scripts with tenderness and care ... a unique window into the mind of a boy who thinks a little differently, but like many kids his age, doesn't quite know how to feel." Professor Roger Soder called it "visceral" and a "delightful story", declaring, "All of us in our Spokane Book Club are special education professionals and so have considerable experience with kids with this disability, and we found the story believable."

Cathy Lowne of the Encyclopædia Britannica wrote that "Haddon's skill lies in writing so that, although Christopher may be unaware of emotional undercurrents and nuances of mood, the reader is made aware of them."

In 2019, the book was ranked 19th on The Guardian's list of the 100 best books of the 21st century.

=== Medical professionals' reviews ===
Alex McClimens, whom Muller quoted above, also wrote: "This magnificent essay in communication is compulsory reading for anyone with the slightest interest in autistic spectrum disorders. This book is also required reading for those who simply enjoy a fascinating story ... we are offered a first person narrative to match anything by contemporary writers. Mark Haddon has created a true literary character and his handling of the teenage Asperger's heroic adventure is brilliantly crafted. He uses the literal mind-set of his hero to mask the true direction of the plot." Reviewer Paul Moorehead calls the book "a fairly ripping adventure story" and writes: "It's also quite a feat of writing. The actual use of language is somewhat austere—an unavoidable consequence of having a boy with autism as a narrator—but it has its own beauty, and it works. So persuasive and so effective is the construction of Christopher, not only is he a character you're rooting for, he's also the character in the story you understand the best. It's startling how believably and comfortably this story puts you into what you might have thought were likely to be some pretty alien shoes."

Reviewer David Ellis, naming The Curious Incident an "ambitious and innovative novel", wrote that Haddon "manages to avoid the opposing pitfalls of either offending people with autism and their families or turning Christopher into an object of pity. Instead of becoming the focus of the plot the autism enhances it. The unemotional descriptions amplify many moments of observational comedy, and misfortunes are made extremely poignantly." He concludes that Christopher's story is "far more enjoyable and likely to stay with you for far longer than any medical textbook".

=== Challenges ===
The Curious Incident of the Dog in the Night-Time has frequently been challenged due to its offensive language, supposed unsuitability for younger readers, and also religious viewpoint. On the American Library Association's lists of the most banned and challenged books, the book landed in the 51st spot between 2010 and 2019, and the fifth spot in 2015.

== Adaptations ==
=== Stage ===
A stage adaptation, by Simon Stephens and directed by Marianne Elliott, premiered at the National Theatre on 2 August 2012. It starred Luke Treadaway as Christopher, Nicola Walker as his mother Judy, Paul Ritter as his father Ed, Una Stubbs as Mrs Alexander and Niamh Cusack as Siobhan. The production, which ran until late October, was broadcast live to cinemas worldwide on 6 September through the National Theatre Live programme.

The production transferred to the Apollo Theatre in Shaftesbury Avenue, London, from March 2013. On 19 December, during a performance, parts of the ceiling fell down, injuring around 80 of the over 700 patrons inside. It re-opened at the Gielgud Theatre on 24 June 2014. The new West End cast was led by Graham Butler as Christopher Boone, with Sarah Woodward as Siobhan, Nicolas Tennant as Ed, Emily Joyce as Judy, Gay Soper as Mrs Alexander, Vicky Willing as Mrs Shears and Daniel Casey as Mr. Shears. In 2015 the cast was Sion Daniel Young as Christopher Boone, with Rebecca Lacey as Siobhan, Nicolas Tennant as Ed, Mary Stockley as Judy, Jacqueline Clarke as Mrs Alexander, Indra Ové as Mrs Shears, Stephen Beckett as Roger Shears, Matthew Trevannion as Mr Thompson, Pearl Mackie as No. 40/Punk Girl, Sean McKenzie as Reverend Peters and Kaffe Keating played alternate Christopher. They were joined by Mark Rawlings, Penelope McGhie, Naomi Said and Simon Victor.

Mickey Rowe was the first openly autistic actor to play Christopher Boone in The Curious Incident of the Dog in the Night-Time. He documented this experience in the book Fearlessly Different: An Autistic Actor's Journey to Broadway's Biggest Stage.

An adaptation and translation into Spanish by María Renée Prudencio played at the Teatro de los Insurgentes in Mexico City in June 2014. The character of Christopher was played by Luis Gerardo Méndez and by Alfonso Dosal on alternate days. An Israeli adaptation (translation into Hebrew by Daniel Efrat) has been staged at the Beit Lessin Theater in Tel Aviv since March of the same year, starring Nadav Netz as Christopher; in 2015, Netz won the Best Actor category at the Israeli Theater Awards for his performance.

An adaptation and translation into French by Dominique Hollier premiered at the Théâtre de la Tempête in Paris, directed by Philippe Adrien, running from September 11 through 18 October 2015. It also ran at Théâtre Le Moderne, in Liege, Belgium, direction by Daniel Henry-Smith, from 28 April through 13 May 2017.

An adaptation and translation into Danish by Christian Bundegaard premiered at the Odense Teater, September 2019, starring Kristoffer Helmuth as Christopher.

The production began a 10th anniversary UK & Ireland tour at Troubadour Wembley Park Theatre on 20 November 2021.

=== Film ===
The film rights for the novel were optioned by Brad Grey and Brad Pitt for Warner Brothers. In 2011, Steve Kloves was attached to write and direct the project, but as of 2026 it has not yet been produced.

A Bengali-English adaptation of the novel has been filmed by Sudipto Roy called Kia and Cosmos, with the gender roles of the characters reversed, and the plot centering around the killing of a cat called Cosmos.
