= Kircher =

Kircher is a surname. Notable people with the surname include:

- Al Kircher (1909–2004), American football, basketball, and baseball player and coach
- Alexander Kircher (1867–1939), Austrian-German marine and landscape painter and illustrator
- Armin Kircher (1966–2015), Austrian composer
- Athanasius Kircher (1602–1680), German Jesuit scholar
- George Kircher (1887–1949), American baseball player and coach
- Herwig Kircher (born 1955), Austrian football player
- Jérôme Kircher (born 1964), French actor
- Knut Kircher (born 1969), German football referee
- Mike Kircher (1897–1972), American baseball player
- Paul Kircher (born 2001), French actor
- Pete Kircher (born 1945), English rock/pop drummer
- Samuel Kircher (born 2004), French actor
- Tim Kircher (born 1999), German football player
- William Kircher (born 1958), New Zealand actor

== See also ==
- Kircher (crater), lunar impact crater that is located in the south-southwestern part of the Moon
