= Last Summer (2023 film) =

2023 film by Catherine Breillat

- Theatrical release poster
- French: L'Été dernier
- Directed by: Catherine Breillat
- Screenplay by: Catherine Breillat; Pascal Bonitzer (collaboration)
- Based on: Queen of Hearts by: May el-Toukhy; Maren Louise Käehne
- Produced by: Saïd Ben Saïd
- Starring: Léa Drucker; Olivier Rabourdin; Samuel Kircher; Clotilde Courau
- Cinematography: Jeanne Lapoirie
- Edited by: François Quiqueré
- Music by: Kim Gordon; Body/Head
- Production company: SBS Productions
- Distributed by: Pyramide Distribution; SBS Distribution
- Release dates: 25 May 2023 (Cannes); 13 September 2023 (France)
- Running time: 104 minutes
- Country: France
- Language: French
- Box office: $1.1 million

Last Summer (French: L'Été dernier) is a 2023 French erotic drama film directed by Catherine Breillat, from a screenplay written by Breillat in collaboration with Pascal Bonitzer. It is a remake of the 2019 Danish film Queen of Hearts. Starring Léa Drucker and Samuel Kircher, the film explores the taboos of a stepmother–stepson relationship.

The film was selected to compete for the Palme d'Or at the 76th Cannes Film Festival, where it premiered on 25 May 2023. It was released in France on 13 September 2023. It received four nominations at the 49th César Awards.

== Synopsis ==
Anne is a respected lawyer who lives in Paris with her husband Pierre and their two young daughters. Théo, Pierre's 17-year-old son from a previous marriage, moves in, and Anne eventually begins an affair with him. In doing so, she risks jeopardizing her career and losing her family. Théo is a fragile figure, and as time passes, the relationship turns destructive.

== Cast ==
- Léa Drucker as Anne
- Olivier Rabourdin as Pierre
- Samuel Kircher as Théo
- Clotilde Courau as Mina
- Serena Hu as Serena
- Angela Chen as Angela
- Romain Maricau as Lucas
- Romane Violeau as Anne's client
- Marie Lucas as Mother of Anne's client
- Nelia Da Costa as Amanda
- Lilas-Rose Gilberti-Poisot as Sara Evrard

== Production ==
Last Summer is director Catherine Breillat's 15th feature film and her first film since her autobiographical drama Abuse of Weakness released ten years earlier. The film is a remake of the 2019 Danish film Queen of Hearts, which was directed by May el-Toukhy, who co-wrote the film with Maren Louise Kaëhne.

Valeria Bruni Tedeschi was initially cast in role of Anne before being replaced by Léa Drucker. Samuel Kircher, the son of actors Irène Jacob and Jérôme Kircher, makes his film debut as the teenage stepson Théo. Samuel was recommended to Breillat by his brother Paul, who was originally scheduled to play the role. In an interview given in early February 2023, Drucker said that Last Summer is "one of the most disturbing films" in which she has acted. The film poses the questions "Is it love? Where does love stop? Where does the transgression begin?" without being "moralistic". The film reminded Drucker of the play Blackbird by Scottish dramatist David Harrower, in which she has starred on stage. Blackbird tells the story of a young woman meeting a middle-aged man fifteen years after being sexually abused by him when she was twelve.

Filming took place from 7 June to 13 July 2022. Jeanne Lapoirie was the director of photography. The film was produced by Saïd Ben Saïd through his company SBS Productions. According to director Catherine Breillat, the shooting took place "in a state of absolute grace". Breillat described herself as physically diminished and "afraid of not holding on", but said she rediscovered her love of filming during the production of Last Summer.

== Release ==
Last Summer was selected to compete for the Palme d'Or at the 2023 Cannes Film Festival, where it had its world premiere on 25 May 2023.

The film was theatrically released in France on 13 September 2023 by Pyramide Distribution. Following screening at the 2023 New York Film Festival. It was also invited at the 28th Busan International Film Festival in 'Icon' section and was screened on 6 October 2023.

== Reception ==
=== Critical response ===
On the review aggregator website Rotten Tomatoes, 87% of 77 critics' reviews are positive, with an average rating of 7.5/10. The website's consensus reads: "A study of unbridled lust, Last Summer may not tell a new taboo story but is never less compelling for it." On Metacritic, the film has a weighted average score of 75 out of 100, based on 21 critic reviews, indicating "generally favorable" reviews. Last Summer received an average rating of 3.6 out of 5 stars on the French website AlloCiné, based on 35 reviews.

Vulture's Allison Willmore labeled the film "a family drama as masterfully propulsive as a horror movie," while Manohla Dargis of The New York Times described it as "a story about a woman who — after entrancing and appalling you — emerges as both more monstrous and more human than you're prepared for" as well as "complex, tricky, at times very uncomfortable and thoroughly engrossing." In a review for The New Yorker, film critic Richard Brody stated that the film was "a long-delayed return to work and an artistic self-renewal". Jordan Mintzer of The Hollywood Reporter described it as "a movie that defies moral boundaries and narrative conventions," while The Chicago Tribune's Michael Phillips labeled it "a work of artfully sustained sexual suspense." Christy Lemire of RogerEbert.com gave the film 3 out of 4 stars and commended it for its candid exploration of women's sexuality. She notes that Breillat's approach is "technically intimate yet tonally detached -- languid as a summer's day, sometimes unbearably so, and often uncomfortably warm" and that the film's "matter-of-fact tone" that amplifies tension and complicates viewer empathy.

Film critic Peter Bradshaw gave the film a less favorable review, rating it 2 out of 5 stars. He describes Last Summer as a "hot – or rather tepid – mess" that fails to capture the original's erotic excitement, pointing out that Breillat's changes dilute the story's impact. He states that while the film starts off capably, it falters in the third act, where the developments become "silly" and lack the necessary "iciness". He concludes that Breillat seems to have retreated from her former uncompromising approach to sexuality, leaving the film feeling safe and uninspired. Screen International's Wendy Ide shared a similar sentiment, describing the film as "oddly muted" despite its provocative subject matter. She notes that the film lacks the "disruptive, confrontational jab" typical of Breillat's earlier work, with key character motivations feeling underexplored. Ide also highlights that while the sexual tension is present, the rapid progression of the affair feels unconvincing. Film critic Sophie Gilbert described it as her favorite among Breillat's films to date.

Writing for Le Figaro, Eric Neuhoff gave Last Summer a poor review and rated it 1 out of 4. He highlights what he sees as the film's "great naivety" and outdated audacity in its depiction of a married woman who has an affair with her stepson. Neuhoff criticizes the film for lacking depth, noting the disconnect between the couple and mocking the shallow performances, particularly that of Samuel Kircher. He concludes that while the film may entertain some, it ultimately feels like an unremarkable addition to Breillat's body of work.

Last Summer was ranked ninth on Cahiers du Cinéma's top 10 films of 2023 list. Filmmakers Sean Baker, Joanna Arnow, Davy Chou, Raven Jackson and Savanah Leaf cited it as among their favorite films of the year.

=== Accolades ===
Award	Date of ceremony	Category	Recipient(s)	Result	Ref.
César Awards	23 February 2024	Best Director	Catherine Breillat	Nominated	
César Awards	23 February 2024	Best Actress	Léa Drucker	Nominated	
César Awards	23 February 2024	Best Male Revelation	Samuel Kircher	Nominated	
César Awards	23 February 2024	Best Adaptation	Catherine Breillat	Nominated	
Cannes Film Festival	27 May 2023	Palme d'Or	Catherine Breillat	Nominated	
Louis Delluc Prize	6 December 2023	Best Film	Last Summer	Nominated	
Lumière Awards	22 January 2024	Best Film	Last Summer	Nominated	
Lumière Awards	22 January 2024	Best Director	Catherine Breillat	Nominated	
Lumière Awards	22 January 2024	Best Actress	Léa Drucker	Nominated	
Lumière Awards	22 January 2024	Best Male Revelation	Samuel Kircher	Nominated	
