= Leonardo Cimino =

American actor (1917–2012)

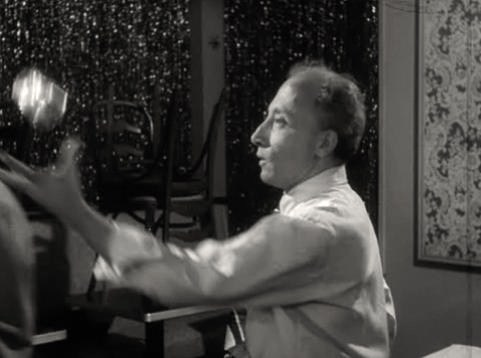
- Cimino in Mad Dog Coll, 1961.
- Born: November 4, 1917; New York City, U.S.
- Died: March 3, 2012 (aged 94); Woodstock, New York, U.S.
- Occupation: Actor
- Years active: 1936–2008
- Spouse: Sharon Powers
- Awards: Obie Award; Joseph Jefferson Award

Leonardo Cimino (November 4, 1917 – March 3, 2012) was an American film, television and stage actor who in 1937 appeared in the original stage production of Marc Blitzstein's The Cradle Will Rock. Cimino's most well known roles are in the 1983 science fiction miniseries, V as Abraham Bernstein and the 1987 feature film The Monster Squad as the "Scary German guy".

== Life and career ==
Born in Manhattan, Cimino was the son of Andrea and Leonilda Cimino. His father was a tailor.

Cimino was initially interested in pursuing a career as a violinist, and studied the instrument at the Juilliard School when he was a teenager. While studying the violin he became interested in acting and dancing, and began studying those as well. In 1936, at the age of 18, he made his professional stage debut in a supporting role in the world premiere of Gladys Bronwyn Stern's Middle Man in Suffern, New York which starred Ernest Truex. It was not until a decade later, however, that Cimino would become dedicated full-time to an acting career. During the late 1930s and early 1940s he studied acting, directing and modern dance at the Neighborhood Playhouse School of the Theatre.

After the outbreak of World War II, Cimino joined the army in 1942. He notably participated in the invasion of Normandy, landing with the Mission Boston second wave on June 6, 1944.

After returning to civilian life in 1945, he continued with performing arts at the Neighborhood Playhouse; notably studying dance with Martha Graham. In 1946 he made his Broadway debut in a revival of Cyrano de Bergerac which starred and was directed by José Ferrer. It was the first of many projects in which Cimino would collaborate with Ferrer. He went on to appear in nearly 20 Broadway productions over the next four decades, including a 1962 adaptation of E. M. Forster’s A Passage to India (play) and a 1985 revival of The Iceman Cometh. In 1976 he was nominated for a Drama Desk Award for his performance of the role of Jim in Arthur Miller's A Memory of Two Mondays.

Cimino also appeared in numerous Off-Broadway productions during his career, notably winning an Obie Award in 1958 for his portrayal of Smerdyakov in The Brothers Karamazov. He frequently appeared Off-Broadway in Shakespeare plays at the Public Theater, including Egeon in The Comedy of Errors (1975) alongside Ted Danson and Danny DeVito. He also appeared in productions in Regional theatres across the United States during his career. In 1970 he was awarded the Joseph Jefferson Award for Best Actor in a Principal Role for his performance in The Man in the Glass Booth at the Goodman Theatre in Chicago.

Cimino made many guest appearances on top TV programs, to include Naked City, The Defenders, The Doctors, Kojak, Ryan's Hope, The Equalizer and Law & Order. In 1981 and 1982, he played Alexei Vartova on ABC's soap opera Ryan's Hope.

He died on March 3, 2012, due to chronic obstructive pulmonary disease (COPD) at his home in Woodstock, New York at the age of 94.

== Filmography ==
=== Film ===
Year	Title	Role	Notes
1961	Mad Dog Coll	Wickles - Bar Owner	
1961	The Young Savages	Mr. Rugiello	Uncredited
1964	Quick, Let's Get Married	Dr. Paoli	
1969	Stiletto	Allie Fargo	Uncredited
1970	Cotton Comes to Harlem	Tom	
1972	Come Back, Charleston Blue	Frank Mago	
1973	Jeremy	Cello Teacher	
1975	The Man in the Glass Booth	Dr. Alvarez	
1980	Hide in Plain Sight	Don Angelo Venucci	
1980	Stardust Memories	Sandy's Analyst	
1982	Amityville II: The Possession	Chancellor	
1982	Monsignor	The Pope	
1984	Dune	The Baron's Doctor	
1987	The Monster Squad	Scary German Guy	
1987	Moonstruck	Felix	
1988	The Seventh Sign	Head Cardinal	
1989	Penn & Teller Get Killed	Ernesto	
1990	Q&A	Nick Petrone	
1990	The Freshman	Lorenzo	
1991	Hudson Hawk	Cardinal	
1993	Claude	Daddy V.J.	
1993	Household Saints	Mario, a Storyteller	
1995	Waterworld	Elder	
1999	Cradle Will Rock	VTA - Man in Line	
2001	18 Shades of Dust	Connie Broglio	
2001	Hannibal	Sammie	(scenes deleted, available on home video releases)
2001	Made	Leo	
2007	Before the Devil Knows You're Dead	William	(final film role)

=== Television ===
Year	Title	Role	Notes
1949	The Big Story	Tyler	1 episode
1958	Armstrong Circle Theatre		1 episode
1958	Naked City	Shellshock	1 episode
1959	The Phil Silvers Show	Bandit #3	1 episode
1959	The DuPont Show of the Month		1 episode
1959	Brenner	Mr. Jackson	1 episode
1960	Armstrong Circle Theatre	Joe March	1 episode
1960	The Witness		1 episode
1960	The DuPont Show of the Month		1 episode
1960	Naked City	Johnny	1 episode
1961	Give Us Barabbas!	Caleb	TV movie
1961	The Power and the Glory		TV movie
1961	Way Out	Nighttime Murderer	1 episode
1961	Route 66	Vendor	1 episode
1961	Naked City	Miklos Konya	1 episode
1961	Naked City	Julio Varraco	1 episode
1962	Naked City	Alberto Russo	1 episode
1963	Naked City	Sid Kitka	1 episode
1963	The Defenders	Ralph Kinderman	1 episode
1965	For the People	LeBlanc	1 episode
1966	ABC Stage 67	Dino	1 episode
1973	The Doctors	Tennessee Eddie Hawkins	
1973	Honor Thy Father	Sam DeCavalcante	TV movie
1974	Kojak	Ruby Kabelsky	2 episodes
1976	Kojak	Cordick	1 episode
1976	Arthur Hailey's the Moneychangers	Ben Rosselli	mini-series, 1 of 4 episodes
1980	A Time for Miracles	Italian Priest	TV movie
1980	Rappaccini's Daughter	Rappaccini	TV movie
1981	Ryan's Hope	Alexei Vartova	10 episodes
1983	V (1983 miniseries)	Abraham Bernstein	mini-series, 2 of 2 episodes
1983	Cocaine and Blue Eyes	Orestes Anatole	TV movie
1983	Will There Really Be a Morning?	Adolph Zukor	TV movie
1984	One Life to Live	Antonescu	1 episode
1986	The Equalizer	Thomas Marley Sr	Episode: "Counterfire"
1989	The Equalizer	Doctor Molinari	2 episodes "The Visitation" (S4.E9) "17 Zebra"" (S4.E14)
1989	The Days and Nights of Molly Dodd	Orambello Johnson	1 episode
1991	Dead and Alive: The Race for Gus Farace		TV movie
1994	M.A.N.T.I.S.	Benny Cruikshank	1 episode
1996	Law & Order	Costello	1 episode
1997	The Hunger	Nero	1 episode
1998	Witness to the Mob	Neil Dellacroce	TV movie
2000	Law & Order	Tommy Valducci	1 episode
