= Samuel Kircher =

French actor (born 2004)

- Born: 23 December 2004 (age 21)
- Occupation: Actor
- Years active: 2023–present
- Parents: Jérôme Kircher (father); Irène Jacob (mother)
- Relatives: Paul Kircher (brother); Maurice Jacob (grandfather)

Samuel Kircher (French: [samɥɛl kiʁʃɛʁ]; born 23 December 2004) is a French actor. The youngest son of actors Irène Jacob and Jérôme Kircher, he is known for his starring role in Catherine Breillat's relationship drama Last Summer (2023), for which he received César Award and Lumière Award nominations.

== Early life ==
Samuel Kircher was born on 23 December 2004. He is the youngest son of actors Irène Jacob and Jérôme Kircher. His grandfather was the physicist Maurice Jacob (1933–2007). He grew up in Paris with his brother Paul, who is three years his senior and is also an actor. They both attended school in the 18th arrondissement. Irène Jacob and Jérôme Kircher both often acted together and took their sons on tours.

== Career ==
Kircher made his screen debut in 2023 in Catherine Breillat's erotic drama Last Summer (L'Été dernier), a remake of the 2019 Danish film Queen of Hearts. In the film, he plays 17-year-old Théo, who moves in with his father Pierre (Olivier Rabourdin) and Pierre's new wife Anne (Léa Drucker). Shortly thereafter, Théo and his stepmother begin an affair. Théo is a fragile figure, and as time passes, the relationship turns destructive. Kircher's brother Paul was originally slated to play the role. However, shooting was delayed, after which Paul was considered too old for the part intended for him. Paul then recommended Samuel, who was not active in cinema, to the director, who ultimately awarded him the role. For his portrayal of Théo, Kircher received nominations for Best Male Revelation at the 29th Lumière Awards and 49th César Awards.

In January 2024, Kircher began filming for Louise Hémon's debut film The Girl in the Snow (L'Engloutie), in which he will star alongside Galatea Bellugi. In August 2024, Kircher began filming for Valéry Carnoy's debut film Wild Foxes (La Danse des Renards).

== Filmography ==
=== Film ===
Year	Title	Role
2023	Last Summer	Théo
2025	Morlaix	Jean-Luc
2025	The Girl in the Snow	Pépin
2025	Wild Foxes	Camille

=== Television ===
Year	Title	Role
2025	The Seduction	Chevalier Danceny

== Awards and nominations ==
Award	Date of ceremony	Category	Title	Result	Ref.
César Awards	23 February 2024	Best Male Revelation	Last Summer	Nominated	
Lumière Awards	22 January 2024	Best Male Revelation	Last Summer	Nominated	
