= The Animal Kingdom (2023 film) =

2023 film by Thomas Cailley

- Theatrical release poster
- French: Le Règne animal
- Directed by: Thomas Cailley
- Written by: Thomas Cailley; Pauline Munier
- Produced by: Pierre Guyard
- Starring: Romain Duris; Paul Kircher; Adèle Exarchopoulos; Tom Mercier; Billie Blain
- Cinematography: David Cailley
- Edited by: Lilian Corbeille
- Music by: Andrea Laszlo De Simone
- Production companies: Nord-Ouest Films; StudioCanal; France 2 Cinéma; Artémis Productions; Shelter Prod
- Distributed by: StudioCanal
- Release dates: 17 May 2023 (Cannes); 4 October 2023 (France)
- Running time: 130 minutes
- Countries: France; Belgium
- Language: French
- Budget: €13–15 million
- Box office: $9.1 million

The Animal Kingdom (French: Le Règne animal) is a 2023 science fantasy adventure drama film directed by Thomas Cailley and written by Cailley and Pauline Munier. It stars Romain Duris, Paul Kircher and Adèle Exarchopoulos.

It had its world premiere as the opening film of the Un Certain Regard section at the 76th Cannes Film Festival on 17 May 2023. It was released in France on 4 October 2023 to mostly positive reviews. It received a leading 12 nominations at the 49th César Awards, and won 5 awards: Best Cinematography, Best Sound, Best Original Music, Best Costume Design and Best Visual Effects.

== Synopsis ==
In a world hit by a wave of mutations that are gradually transforming some humans into animals, François does everything he can to save his wife, who is affected by this mysterious condition. As some of the creatures disappear into a nearby forest, he embarks with Émile, their 16-year-old son, on a quest that will change their lives forever.

== Cast ==
- Romain Duris as François
- Paul Kircher as Émile
- Adèle Exarchopoulos as Julia
- Tom Mercier as Fix
- Billie Blain as Nina
- Nathalie Richard as Professor Valérie Beaudoin
- Saadia Bentaieb as Naïma

== Production ==
The Animal Kingdom is the second feature film by French director Thomas Cailley, after releasing his award-winning debut feature Love at First Fight in 2014. He co-wrote the screenplay with Pauline Munier based on an original idea by Munier. It is set in the Gironde department, where the filmmaker grew up and where his first film was staged (Landes de Gascogne). The screenplay was written before the COVID-19 pandemic. As with Love at First Fight, Pierre Guyard of Nord-Ouest Films served as the film's producer, while his brother David served as director of photography and Lilian Corbeille handled editing. The principal roles were performed by Romain Duris, Adèle Exarchopoulos and Paul Kircher. Duris indicated that he would play one of the surviving beings. He praised the script, but said the film would feature a lot of special effects, which would not make it easy for an actor.

Shooting began in May 2022 and took place entirely in the Nouvelle-Aquitaine region, largely divided across Landes, Dordogne and Gironde. The filming began in the commune of Fleix and moved across the banks of the river Lot in Lot-et-Garonne, particularly in the communes of Le Temple-sur-Lot and Castelmoron-sur-Lot. Production costs have been estimated between 13 and 15 million euros. In total, filming was to last 57 days, until mid-August. The project received financial support from the Centre national du cinéma et de l'image animée (CNC), a government agency responsible for promoting cinema.

== Release ==
The film was selected to be screened as the opening film of the Un Certain Regard section of the 76th Cannes Film Festival, where it had its world premiere on 17 May 2023. The film was theatrically released in France by StudioCanal on 4 October 2023. It was also invited at the 28th Busan International Film Festival in 'Open Cinema' section and was screened on 8 October 2023.

== Reception ==
=== Critical response ===
On Rotten Tomatoes, the film holds an approval rating of 83% based on 59 reviews, with an average rating of 7/10. The site's critics consensus reads: "The Animal Kingdom's talented cast anchors its more fantastical elements in human emotion, helping offset a superficial treatment of thought-provoking themes." On Metacritic, the film has a weighted average score of 69 out of 100, based on 17 critic reviews indicating "generally favorable" reviews. On AlloCiné, the film received an average rating of 4.3 out of 5 stars, based on 45 reviews from French critics.

=== Accolades ===
Award	Date of ceremony	Category	Recipient(s)	Result	Ref.
Cannes Film Festival	26 May 2023	Un Certain Regard	Thomas Cailley	Nominated	
César Awards	23 February 2024	Best Film	The Animal Kingdom	Nominated	
César Awards	23 February 2024	Best Director	Thomas Cailley	Nominated	
César Awards	23 February 2024	Best Actor	Romain Duris	Nominated	
César Awards	23 February 2024	Best Male Revelation	Paul Kircher	Nominated	
César Awards	23 February 2024	Best Original Screenplay	Thomas Cailley and Pauline Munier	Nominated	
César Awards	23 February 2024	Best Cinematography	David Cailley	Won	
César Awards	23 February 2024	Best Editing	Lilian Corbeille	Nominated	
César Awards	23 February 2024	Best Sound	Fabrice Osinski, Raphaël Sohier, Matthieu Fichet, and Niels Barletta	Won	
César Awards	23 February 2024	Best Original Music	Andrea Laszlo De Simone	Won	
César Awards	23 February 2024	Best Costume Design	Ariane Daurat	Won	
César Awards	23 February 2024	Best Production Design	Julia Lemaire	Nominated	
César Awards	23 February 2024	Best Visual Effects	Cyrille Bonjean, Bruno Sommier, Jean-Louis Autret	Won	
Louis Delluc Prize	6 December 2023	Best Film	The Animal Kingdom	Won	
Lumière Awards	22 January 2024	Best Film	The Animal Kingdom	Nominated	
Lumière Awards	22 January 2024	Best Director	Thomas Cailley	Won	
Lumière Awards	22 January 2024	Best Screenplay	Thomas Cailley	Nominated	
Lumière Awards	22 January 2024	Best Cinematography	David Cailley	Nominated	
Lumière Awards	22 January 2024	Best Music	Andrea Laszlo De Simone	Nominated	
Miskolc International Film Festival	9 September 2023	Emeric Pressburger Prize for Best Feature Film	The Animal Kingdom	Nominated	
