= Andrea Laszlo De Simone =

Italian musician

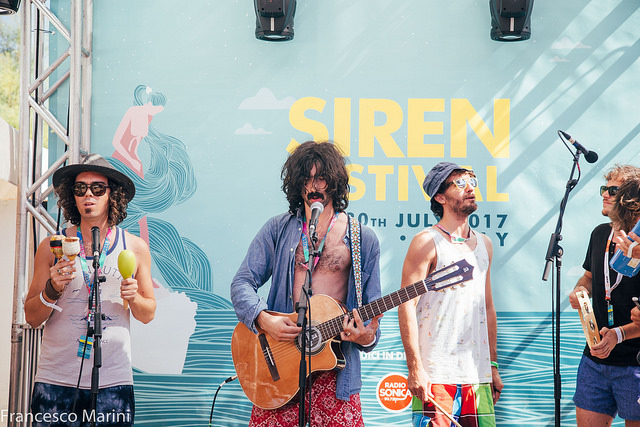
- Andrea Laszlo de Simone at the Siren Festival of Vasto

Background information
- Born: February 18, 1986 (age 40); Turin, Italy
- Instruments: Vocals, guitar, drums
- Labels: 42 Records, Ekleroshock, Hamburger Records
- Website: andrealaszlodesimoneofficial.bandcamp.com

Andrea Oliviero Laszlo De Simone Saccà (born 18 February 1986) is an Italian singer-songwriter and musician.

== Early life ==
Andrea Laszlo De Simone was born in Turin on 18 February, 1986, to parents from southern Italy. His middle name was given to him as a tribute to Hungarian film director László Kovács.

Originally the drummer in the band Nadàr Solo, De Simone made his debut as a soloist in 2012 with the album Ecce homo, named after the book by Friedrich Nietzsche. He previously performed in the duo Anthony Laszlo, alongside Anthony Sasso.

In 2017, he released the album Uomo donna, produced with sound engineer Giuseppe Lo Bue and released on 42 Records. Rolling Stone described the record as the second best Italian prog solo album of the last 20 years. At the end of 2019 he released the album Immensità, a crossover between pop and classical music, accompanied by a film of the same name. Immensità received positive reviews from critics.

In 2020, he released the single Dal giorno in cui sei nato tu, a song dedicated to his children, alongside a music video in super8 made by his eldest child, Martino. In 2021, he released the song Vivo, accompanied by numerous livecams from across the world.

On 11 April 2021, he released Il Film del Concerto, a recording of a concert by the "Immensità Orchestra". Directed by Fabrizio Borelli, it took place in Milan's Triennale as part of the MI AMI festival. At the end of August 2021, he returned to performing live with the Immensità Orchestra for three concerts: in Turin for the TOdays festival, in the Auditorium Parco della Musica in Rome and in front of the Basilica di San Nicola in Bari, for the Locus festival. During these three dates, he announced that he would be suspending his live performances "indefinitely" to spend time with his family and focus on composition and music production.

In 2023, he composed the soundtrack to Thomas Cailley's science fiction adventure film The Animal Kingdom, for which he won the award for Best Original Music at the 49th César Awards.

== Discography ==
=== As a soloist ===
==== Studio albums ====
- 2012 – Ecce homo
- 2017 – Uomo donna
- 2025 – Una lunghissima ombra

==== EP ====
- 2020 – Immensità

==== Singles ====
- 2012 – Solo un uomo
- 2012 – 11:43
- 2012 – I nostri piccoli occhi
- 2017 – Vieni a salvarmi
- 2017 – La guerra dei baci
- 2017 – Sogno l'amore
- 2018 – Gli uomini hanno fame
- 2018 – Sparite tutti
- 2019 – Conchiglie
- 2019 – Mistero
- 2019 – La nostra fine
- 2019 – Immensità
- 2020 – Dal giorno in cui sei nato tu
- 2021 – Vivo
- 2022 – I nostri giorni
- 2025 – Un momento migliore

==== Film Soundtracks ====
- 2023 — The Animal Kingdom

=== As part of Anthony Laszlo ===
==== Studio albums ====
- 2015 – Anthony Laszlo
