= Trusting Beatrice =

- Directed by: Cindy Lou Johnson
- Written by: Cindy Lou Johnson
- Produced by: Mark Evan Jacobs; Cindy Lou Johnson
- Starring: Irène Jacob
- Cinematography: Bernd Heinl
- Edited by: Camilla Toniolo
- Music by: Stanley Myers
- Production company: J. J. Films
- Distributed by: Castle Hill Productions
- Release date: January 29, 1993 (Los Angeles)
- Running time: 86 minutes
- Country: United States
- Language: English

Trusting Beatrice is a 1993 American romantic comedy drama film written and directed by Cindy Lou Johnson and starring Irène Jacob.

== Cast ==
- Irène Jacob as Beatrice de Lucio
- Mark Evan Jacobs as Claude Dewey
- Charlotte Moore as Mrs. Dewey
- Leonardo Cimino as Daddy V.J.
- Pat McNamara as Mr. Dewey
- Steve Buscemi as Danny

== Production ==
According to Jacob, the film was shot in five weeks. The fact that her English was “shaky” at the time helped Jacob earn the role of Beatrice.

== Release ==
The film was released in Los Angeles on January 29, 1993. There, it earned $3,349 on its opening weekend. The film then had its New York premiere at the Quad Cinema on February 12, 1993.

== Reception ==
Vincent Canby of The New York Times gave the film a negative review, calling it "the sort of failed comedy that becomes increasingly difficult to watch as it proceeds."

Michael Wilmington of the Los Angeles Times also gave the film a negative review and wrote that it "means to soar and sing, but it’s blocky, awkward, forced."

The Chicago Tribune also gave the film a negative review: "Johnson, in her first feature film, has turned out a wan romantic comedy whose screenplay is its downfall, a concoction containing more holes than laughs, more cliches than creativity."
