= Paul Kircher =

French actor (born 2001)

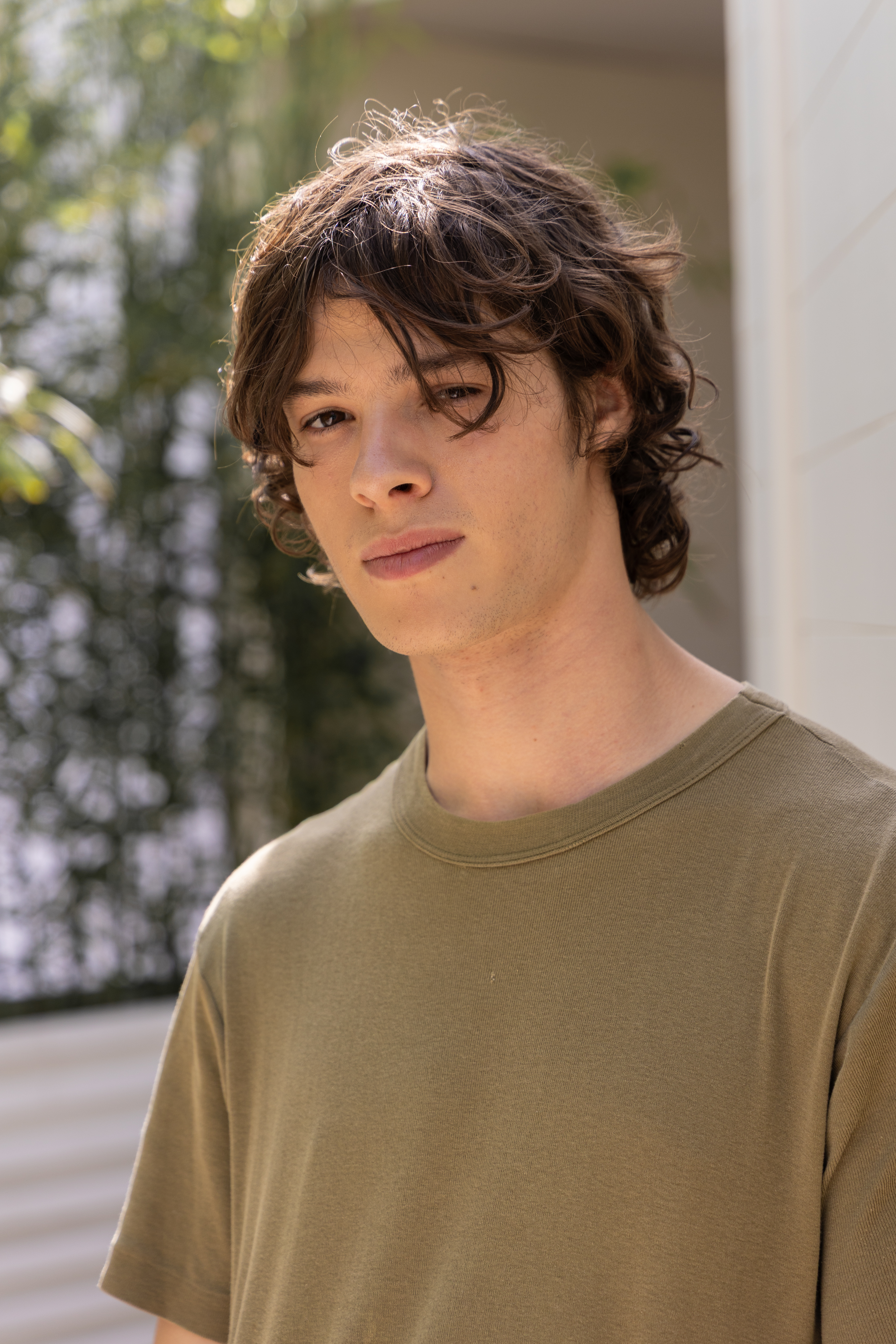
- Kircher at the 2025 Cannes Film Festival
- Born: 30 December 2001 (age 24); Paris, France
- Occupation: Actor
- Years active: 2020–present
- Parents: Jérôme Kircher (father); Irène Jacob (mother)
- Relatives: Samuel Kircher (brother); Maurice Jacob (grandfather)

Paul Kircher (French: [pɔl kiʁʃɛʁ]; born 30 December 2001) is a French actor. The elder son of actors Irène Jacob and Jérôme Kircher, he is known for his starring roles in the drama film Winter Boy (2022) and the adventure film The Animal Kingdom (2023). Both roles earned him nominations for the César Award for Most Promising Actor. For starring in the coming-of-age drama film And Their Children After Them (2024), he won the Marcello Mastroianni Award for Best Young Actor.

== Early life ==
Paul Kircher was born in Paris on 30 December 2001. He is the elder son of actors Irène Jacob and Jérôme Kircher. His grandfather was the physicist Maurice Jacob (1933–2007). He grew up in Paris with his brother Samuel, who is three years his junior and is also an actor. They both attended school in the 18th arrondissement. Irène Jacob and Jérôme Kircher both often acted together and took their sons on tours.

Originally, Kircher did not want to follow in his parents' footsteps by stepping into the acting business, an industry which initially "scared him a bit". Parallel to attending high school, he took lessons at a music school in Paris and sang in various rock bands. After graduating from high school, he began studying geography and economics at Paris Diderot University. At the same time, he completed theater internships with Jordan Beswick, who is a professor at the Lee Strasberg Theatre and Film Institute in New York and at the Manufacture des Abbesses in Paris.

== Career ==
Kircher made his feature film debut in 2020 in the teen comedy How to Make Out (T'as pécho?) directed by Adeline Picault. In the film, he took on the lead role of 15-year-old Arthur, whose love for Ouassima (portrayed by Inès d'Assomption) is unrequited. He then gathers a group of unsuccessful male classmates to give them tips on flirting with girls. Kircher had found out about the casting from a friend and spontaneously auditioned. The part led Kircher to another major role, in the 2021 romantic comedy film A Little Lesson in Love (Petite leçon d'amour), which starred Laetitia Dosch and Pierre Deladonchamps as lovers.

Kircher's breakthrough as a film actor was the award-winning title role in Christophe Honoré's semi-autobiographical drama Winter Boy (Le Lycéen) Kircher portrays Lucas Ronis, a 17-year-old gay teenager coping with the sudden and unexpected death of his father in an accident that may or may not have been suicide. To help her spiraling son, Isabelle (Juliet Binoche) sends Lucas to Paris for a week with his older brother Quentin (Vincent Lacoste). Honoré had chosen Kircher from hundreds of actors and would later praise him for his "overwhelming sensitivity". In preparation, he gave the actor, among other things, the novel The Beautiful Room Is Empty by Edmund White to read. For his portrayal of Lucas, Kircher won the Silver Shell for Best Leading Performance at the 70th San Sebastián International Film Festival and received nominations for the César Award for Most Promising Actor and the Lumière Award for Best Male Revelation.

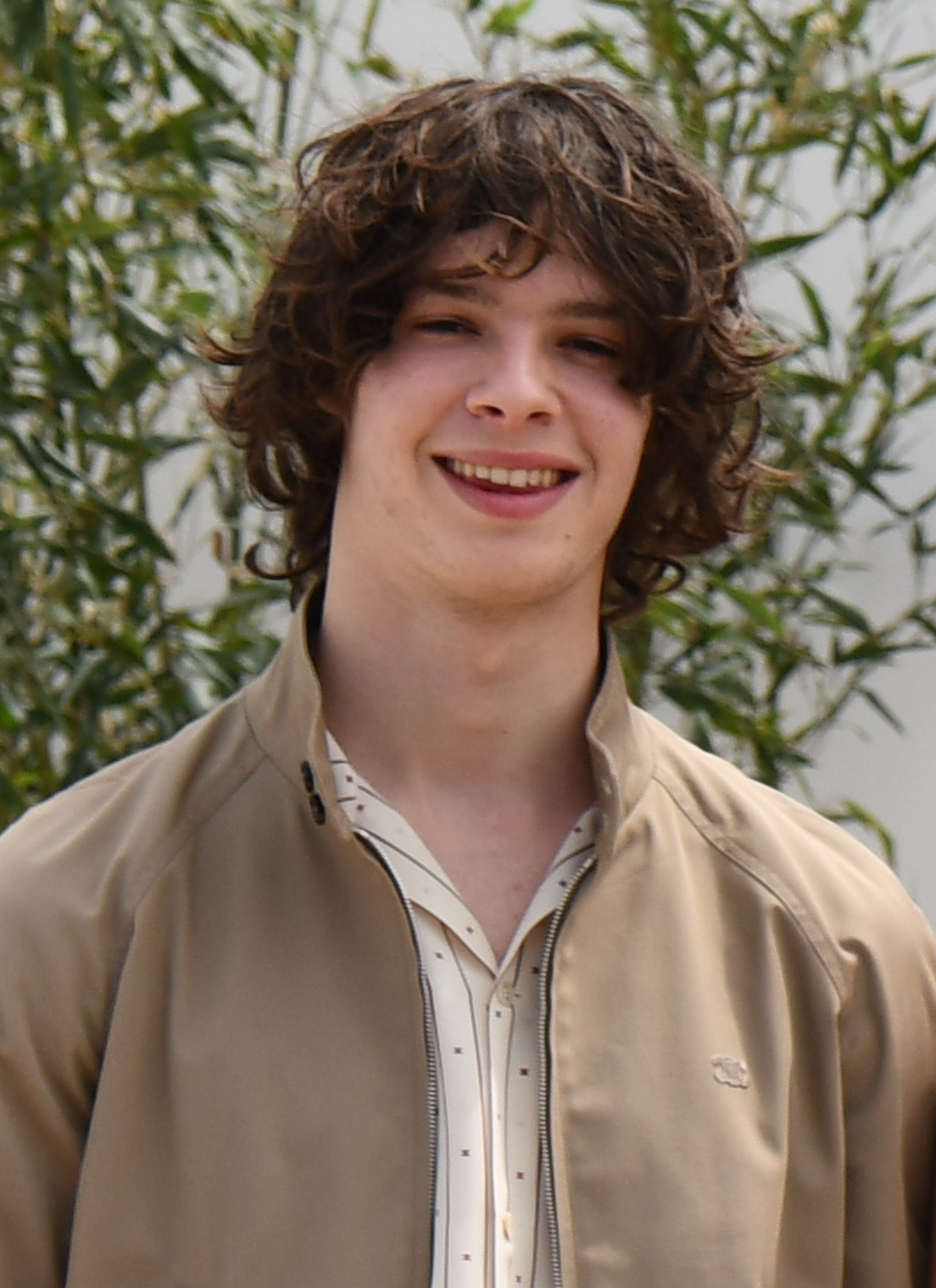
Kircher at the 2023 Cannes Film Festival

Following the success of Winter Boy, Kircher was originally slated to play the male lead in Catherine Breillat's erotic drama Last Summer (L'Été dernier). However, the shooting was delayed, after which the actor was considered too old for the part intended for him. He then recommended his brother Samuel, who was not active in cinema, to the director, who ultimately awarded him the role. Kircher was instead cast in a main role alongside Romain Duris and Adèle Exarchopoulos in Thomas Cailley's science fiction adventure film The Animal Kingdom (Le Règne animal), which screened as the opening film of the Un Certain Regard section at the 76th Cannes Film Festival.

Kircher next played the lead role in Ludovic and Zoran Boukherma's And Their Children After Them (Leurs enfants après eux), an adaptation of Nicolas Mathieu's novel of the same name. The film premiered at the 81st Venice International Film Festival, with Kircher portraying Anthony, a 14-year-old boy navigating the socio-economic and racial tensions in the fictional town of Heillange during the 1990s. Guy Lodge from Variety noted Kircher's portrayal as 'cocky' and 'charismatic,' embodying the reckless bravado of a teenager grappling with the limitations of his small-town life. His performance earned him the Marcello Mastroianni Award for Best Young Actor.

He made his theater debut in January 2025, portraying French playwright Bernard-Marie Koltès in Les Idoles, at the Théâtre de la Porte Saint-Martin. Kircher next starred in two films that screened at the 2025 Cannes Film Festival: Hubert Charuel's Meteors (Météors) and Cédric Klapisch's Colours of Time. He will next star in Phuong Mai Nguyen's animated feature, In Waves, based on the graphic novel of the same name by AJ Dungo.

== Filmography ==
Key
†	Denotes productions that have not yet been released

=== Film ===
Year	Title	Role	Notes
2020	How to Make Out	Arthur	
2021	A Little Lesson in Love	Lancelot Girerd	
2022	Winter Boy	Lucas Ronis	
2023	Les uns sur les autres	Isaac	Short film
2023	The Animal Kingdom	Émile	
2024	Nos Cabanes	Reda	Short film
2024	And Their Children After Them	Anthony	
2025	Meteors	Mika	
2025	Colours of Time	Anatole	
2026	Cracheurs	Alex	Short film
2026	Forty Love †	Sacha Gallo	
TBA	In Waves †	Eon (voice)	

=== Television ===
Year	Title	Role	Notes
2020	Capitaine Marleau	Manu Philippon	Episode: "L'Arbre aux Esclaves"
2022	Weekend Family	Alexis	Episode: "Double Axel"

=== Theatre ===
Year	Title	Role	Venue	Notes
2025	Les Idoles	Bernard-Marie Koltès	Théâtre de la Porte Saint-Martin	

=== Music videos ===
Year	Title	Artist	Role	Ref.
2022	"En famille"	Florent Marchet		
2025	"Cette chanson sur laquelle tu danses"	Princesse		

== Awards and nominations ==
Award	Date of ceremony	Category	Title	Result	Ref.
César Awards	24 February 2023	Most Promising Actor	Winter Boy	Nominated	
César Awards	23 February 2024	Best Male Revelation	The Animal Kingdom	Nominated	
Cinemania	2022	Best Actor	Winter Boy	Won	
Lumière Awards	16 January 2023	Best Male Revelation	Winter Boy	Nominated	
Lumière Awards	20 January 2025	Best Actor	And Their Children After Them	Nominated	
San Sebastián International Film Festival	24 September 2022	Silver Shell for Best Leading Performance (Note: shared with Carla Quílez for her performance in Motherhood.)	Winter Boy	Won	
Seville European Film Festival	16 November 2024	Best Actor	And Their Children After Them	Won	
Venice International Film Festival	7 September 2024	Marcello Mastroianni Award	And Their Children After Them	Won	
