= Capitaine Marleau =

French television series

- Genre: Crime comedy
- Created by: Elsa Marpeau
- Written by: Elsa Marpeau; Stéphan Guérin-Tillié; Sonia Moyersoen; Marc-Antoine Laurent; Jean-Marc Taba; Sylvie Granotier; Marc Eisenchteter; John McNulty
- Directed by: Josée Dayan
- Starring: Corinne Masiero
- Composers: Catherine Lara; Cyril Lehn
- Country of origin: France
- Original language: French
- No. of seasons: 4
- No. of episodes: 28

Production
- Executive producers: Josée Dayan; Gaspard de Chavagnac
- Producer: François Bennaceur
- Cinematography: Stefan Ivanov; Thomas Bataille
- Editor: Yves Langlois
- Running time: 90 minutes
- Production company: France Télévisions

Original release
- Network: France Télévisions (France); La Une (Belgium); RTS Deux (Switzerland); MHZ (United States)
- Release: 20 December 2014 – present

Capitaine Marleau is a French television series created by Elsa Marpeau. It was first broadcast on France 3 on 20 December 2014 and since 2021 on France 2.

Directed by Josée Dayan, the series stars Corinne Masiero as the title character, an eccentric captain of the National Gendarmerie whose mixed personality of dark humour and unconventional approaches often separates her from her colleagues. Four seasons have been broadcast to date, featuring Gerard Depardieu, David Suchet, Pierre Arditi, Sandrine Bonnaire, Nicole Garcia and Muriel Robin in principal starring roles alongside Masiero.

A total of 28 episodes have been broadcast to date. Outside of France, the series is broadcast by La Une in Belgium, RTS Deux in Switzerland and Ici TOU.TV in Canada and is available in the United States on the MHz broadcast network and MHz Choice streaming. The series does not currently hold a British broadcaster.

== Release ==
Three DVD box sets have so far been released in France and the United States (MHz Home Video).

The first, released on 22 November 2017, is billed as Season 1 and contains the two-part pilot, plus all four episodes from Season 1 and the first two episodes of Season 2. The US release does not include the two-part pilot. 01) Philippe Muir with Gérard Depardieu (Cyrano De Bergerac) 02) The House of the Meyer Sisters with Bulle Ogier (The Discreet Charm on the Bourgeoisie} 03) The Mysteries of Faith with Victoria Abril (Tie Me Up, Tie Me Down) 04) The Hazy Spa with Bruno Todeschini (Nicolas Le Floch) 05) Optical Illusion with Pierre Arditi (Blood of the Vine) 06) Night of the Red Moon with Sandrine Bonnaire (La Cérémonie, Monsieur Hire)

The second set, released on 7 November 2018, contains the final episode of Season 1 plus the first five episodes of Season 2. 07) Open Air with Julie Depardieu (Paris je t'aime) 08) Room with A View with Yolande Moreau (Amelie, Paris je't aime) 09) Buried Memory with Niels Arestrup (Suite Noir) 10) Blood and Light with David Suchet (Poirot) 11) The Young Man and Death with Jean-Hugues Anglade (The Passenger, Braquo) 12) Double Dealing with Grégoire Leprince-Ringuet (The Black Book)

The third set, released on 27, October, 2020, contains the final two episodes of season 2 and the first four episodes of season 3: 13) The Black Reeds with Nicole Garcia (My American Uncle) 14) Never to Die Again with Isabelle Adjani (Call My Agent!) 15) A Voice in the Night with Jeanne Balibar (The Tunnel) 16) Roller Coaster with Marina Hands (Lady Chatterley) 17) Lover Gone Bad with Kad Merad (Baron Noir) 18) Peace and Health with Mélanie Doutey (Post Partum)

Currently, the series has yet to be released on DVD outside of France and the United States and after three sets MHz Home Video shut down and morphed into MHz Choice Streaming, discontinuing all DVD releases.

== Episodes ==
Series	Episodes	Originally released	
Series	Episodes	First released	Last released
Pilot	2	20 December 2014	27 December 2014
1	7	15 September 2015	4 April 2017
2	7	3 October 2017	2 April 2019
3	8	9 April 2019	5 December 2020
4	4	5 March 2021	17 March 2023
5	11	30 March 2024	28 June 2025

=== Pilot (2014) ===
No.	Title	Directed by	Written by	Original release date	Viewers (millions)
1	"Entre vents et marées (Part 1)"	Josée Dayan	Philippe Besson & Daniel Tonachella	20 December 2014	3.43
2	"Entre vents et marées (Part 2)"	Josée Dayan	Philippe Besson & Daniel Tonachella	27 December 2014	3.62

=== Season 1 (2015—2017) ===
No. overall	No. in season	Title	Directed by	Written by	Original release date	Viewers (millions)
1	1	"Philippe Muir"	Josée Dayan	Elsa Marpeau	15 September 2015	3.70
"Philippe Muir" (US 1.1) The head of a truck company, Philippe Muir, leaves Cécile with whom he spent the night, and discovers in the premises of his company the body of a woman. She was shot and killed. Unable to join his son Samuel, he went to see his sister Blanche. She does not know where her nephew is. The gendarmerie arrived at the scene with Captain Marleau. She asked Blanche, who revealed that the dead woman, their accountant, was doing everything to reduce the costs of the company. Captain Marleau discovers that Samuel, a former crack addict, was extending his journeys to buy drugs. She also discovers a scene of video surveillance in which he attacks the accountant violently. For his part, Philippe continues to seek his son, with the help of Cécile, who followed the reinsertion of Samuel. She wants to continue the adventure with Muir, but he explains why he prefers to leave her: after the accidental death of his first love and then his wife Heloise, he believes that the women he loves are doomed to die brutally . They manage to find Samuel, thanks to his companion Salome, and Captain Marleau arrests him. He reveals that he argued with the accountant because this last love state of his father. His companion establishes his alibi. He is released, but Blanche, Philippe's beloved sister, escapes shortly after a fatal car accident: the hose has been sabotaged. The suspicions of Captain Marleau then turned to Pierre Lacoudre, a disappointed lover of Blanche. The latter admits to having tampered with the car without wanting to kill Blanche, and denies having killed the accountant. Marleau rushed to Cecilia, the new wife whom Philip loved: she was the future victim, and she was sure of finding there the murderer of women in the life of Muir. Cast: Gérard Depardieu as Philippe Muir, Hélène Vincent as Blanche Muir, Catherine Wilkening as Cécile Castelnau, Jean-Claude Drouot as Léopold Salaun, Jean Benguigui as Pierre Lacoudre, Camille Razat as Salomé Delevigne, Jérôme Kircher as Theater teacher
2	2	"Le Domaine des sœurs Meyer"	Josée Dayan	Elsa Marpeau	10 May 2016	4.42
"The House of the Meyer Sisters" (US 1.2) The owner of a brewery, Frantz Meyer, is a patriarch who dominated his family: his wife Katel, lost in his delusions, and his three daughters Clara, Petra and Augustine. But he decided to sell the brewery, convinced by his eldest daughter. Her other girls accepted her decision each in their own way: if the younger is indifferent, the younger lives only for her religious faith. While the buyer visits the brewery, the accountant's body is found in cereals for beer. Later, we find the body of Frantz Meyer, probably murdered while he went out for a walk. Captain Marleau inquired by asking his three daughters, their mother, and Dimitri Nobécourt, who was planning to buy the Patriarch's affair. She discovers that the brewery was on the brink of bankruptcy, and that the accounts were falsified by the accountant for some years; The deception will inevitably be discovered at the time of the sale, the accountant committed suicide. Marleau then wonders why Dimitri Nobécourt wanted to buy the brewery, which he knew on the brink of bankruptcy. She discovers that he was looking for his real parents. He finally appears that he is the son of the former owner of the brewery, who would have left with a guest of the inn. Marleau continues to question the family members, and the case is corrected with the mysterious disappearance of the mother, Katel. While Marleau follows Dimitri to better understand her real motivations, she is knocked out by watching him while he searches the floor of an old shed. She discovers that a long time ago, Katel murdered her husband's mistress, both of whom had Dimitri as their child. Her younger daughter accuses herself of the murder of her father, but not being able to clear up certain areas of the affair that have remained in the dark, Marleau does not believe her guilty. Who is the culprit? Cast: Sagamore Stévenin as Dimitri Nobecourt, Bulle Ogier as Katel Meyer, Jean-Pierre Marielle as Frantz Meyer, Sophie Cattani as Clara Meyer, Catherine Samie as Hadrienne Nobecourt, Sophie Quinton as Young Katel
3	3	"Les Mystères de la foi"	Josée Dayan	Stéphan Guérin-Tillié & Elsa Marpeau	6 September 2016	4.24
"The Mysteries of Faith" (US 1.3) Manuela, a young Spaniard, arrives in a convent. She wishes to speak to the superior mother, who seems to conceal a heavy secret. Shortly after, the young woman died, fallen from the window of her hotel room. Captain Marleau goes down to her hotel to investigate better: she considers the theses of the accident or suicide unreliable. She goes first to another client, a newly arrived priest, Father Vincent. He says he does not know the victim, whose identity is unknown. While searching the young woman's business, she finds a Bible and a bookmark that leads her to the convent. Mother Louise acknowledges having lodged Manuela for a few weeks but claims not to know her exact identity. The gendarmes discover that the gardener of the convent, Jean, has a criminal past. Marleau interrogates him, but he asserts that at the hour of death he was delivering elsewhere in the city. Marleau decided to settle in the convent, where she could observe the nuns. Sister Maryse never ceases to follow the mother superior and to do everything for her, which annoys Sister Celestine, who sees there an interested zeal. Marleau suspected that the gardener had taken one of the nuns to town. She discovers that Manuela was carrying a pregnant child for others. She was related to a former Spanish murderer who had just been assassinated. Mother Louise in her youth was one of her friends. She ended by telling her story to Marleau: convinced that she was the cause of the death of a man, she had gone to France, where she took refuge in a convent and took the veil. But she denies wanting to kill Manuela. When Marleau returns to the convent, Maryse has shut herself up with the superior mother: it was out of love for her that she defended Manuela, to protect her from possible blackmail. Cast: Victoria Abril as Mother Louise, Stéphan Guérin-Tillié as Father Vincen, Irène Jacob as Sister Maryse, Agathe Natanson as Sister Françoise, Jeanne Cohendy as Sister Béatrice
4	4	"Brouillard en thalasso"	Josée Dayan	Stéphan Guérin-Tillié & Elsa Marpeau	13 September 2016	4.61
"The Hazy Spa" (US 1.4) Garance Thibaut returns to her spa/luxury hotel. Her husband, rich industrialist Paul Thibaut, joined her, but the meeting turned badly: they were in the process of divorce and Garance slapped him. Thibaut then finds Milena Ferey but she no longer wishes to be his mistress. The next day, an employee discovers a body in the thalassotherapy space of the hotel. The news arrives quickly to the managers, the Férey couple: Paul Thibaut, the one who put them afloat, died assassinated. When the gendarmes arrived at the scene, Captain Marleau uncovered a young marginal who was hiding in a garden shed. Everything seems to accuse Marin, an abandoned child tossed from foster home to foster home. While Garance takes care of a dance performance with the choreographer Vladimir Lipinski, Marleau discovers that the son of Thibaut, Clément, returned from Africa where he lived shortly before his father's death. But his mother hides this information. Garance fears that his son may have killed Paul. Marleau decides to question his former fiancee, with whom Clement had broken shortly before their marriage. Garance and she hide a heavy secret: Paul Thibaut used to sleep with the women he wanted, and had raped his son's betrothed. While seeking Marin, who escaped, Marleau finds Clement in filming Garance. But he is not the culprit either. Marleau decides to put a trap to the assassin: she announces a search of the premises to find the weapon of the crime. At night, Milena Férey panics and tries to recover the tool box that had disappeared. She is then apprehended by the gendarmes on the lookout. Cast: Muriel Robin as Garance Thibaut, Bruno Todeschini as Luc Ferey, Claire Nebout as Miléna Ferey, Alain-Fabien Delon as Marin Cibié, Frédéric van den Driessche as Paul Thibaut, Pierre Perrier as Clément Thibaut
5	5	"En trompe-l'œil"	Josée Dayan	Jean-Marc Taba, Marc-Antoine Laurent & Elsa Marpeau	21 March 2017	6.19
"Optical Illusion" (US 1.5) In the house of the famous novelist author of polaris Gilles Garin who is giving a party, the au pair who takes care of the son of this one, Elsa Floriot, aged 22, is murdered at one blow Of revolver Luger. Captain Marleau conducts the survey with members of the writer's family: his wife Judith (who is also her editor), her nine-year-old son Alex (whose twin brother Léo died accidentally a few years earlier), His brother-in-law the musician Marc Durieux, the tutor of his son Cédric and other inhabitants of the village such as the house-keeper of the hotel-restaurant Fanny Brun and his son Julien, the gardener in love with Elsa and Mysterious Corinne Vidal who lives in Garin's work to which she is sure to inspire the character of Blanche Saint-Leger and of which she is madly in love despite the prohibition to approach her. Cast: Catherine Allégret as Fanny Brun, Pierre Arditi as Gilles Garin, Aure Atika as Judith Garin, Michel Fau as Marc Durieux, Sophie Quinton as Corinne Vidal, Félix Bossuet as Alex, Kader Boukhanef as Adjudant Tahar, Morgane Cabot as Elsa Floriot, Cyrille Eldin as Cédric Augier
6	6	"La Nuit de la Lune rousse"	Josée Dayan	Sylvie Granotier, Sonia Moyersoen & Elsa Marpeau	28 March 2017	6.29
""Night of the Red Moon" (US 1.6) Jeanne Dewaere, 40, director of a zoological park, destroys evidence that her young protege, Manon, is involved in a vandalism case that went wrong and caused the death of two people. Jeanne wants at all costs to avoid Manon's prison cell. It must be said that Jeanne is a former prisoner, hiding all her past. The secrets of the director soon make her the main suspect when her neighbor, whom she hates, Michel Chalard, is found dead, hung at his home. He had already been targeted by vandals, which places Jeanne in a delicate situation. Captain Marleau tries to establish the truth. Cast: Sandrine Bonnaire as Jeanne Dewaere, Manuel Blanc as Alain Peras, Jean-Claude Drouot as Léopold Salaun, Alain Fromager as Michel Chalard, Marius Colucci as Oscal Langevin, Vincent Primault as Gabriel, Céline Samie as Emilie Guingand, Louison Bergman as Manon Bechet, Sylvain Urban as Léonard Vincenne
7	7	"À ciel ouvert"	Josée Dayan	Sylvie Granotier & Elsa Marpeau	4 April 2017	5.78
"Open Air" (US 1.7) Alexandrine, an amateur parachutist, dies after falling by practicing his favorite activity. The investigation quickly revealed that his parachute was sabotaged. Captain Marleau wonders who of his entourage could have wished for his death, Carlos, his monitor and secret lover, to Clémence, the latter's wife. She also suspects Clara, ex-wife of Carlos, who is none other than the twin sister of Clemence. Cast: Géraldine Pailhas as Clémence Dos Santos / Clara de Combelle, Charles Berling as Carlos Dos Santo, Julie Depardieu as Jeannette Poupeaux, Dani as Elvira Chastagne, Jean-Claude Drouot as Leopold Salaun, Jacques Spiesser as Thibault Le Preux, François-Dominique Blin as Isidore, Laura Giudice as Alexandrine Raguenes

=== Season 2 (2017—2018) ===
No. overall	No. in season	Title	Directed by	Written by	Original release date	Viewers (millions)
8	1	"Chambre avec vue"	Josée Dayan	Marc-Antoine Laurent & Jean-Marc Taba	3 October 2017	6.84
"Room with A View" (US 1.8) A former policewoman who trained Captain Marleau is the victim of an attempted murder. Cast: Yolande Moreau as Catherine Rougemont, Patrick Bouchitey as Hugo Perez, Rod Paradot as Gabriel, Cédric Le Maoût as Loïc Planchon
9	2	"La Mémoire enfouie"	Josée Dayan	Stéphan Guérin-Tillié	10 October 2017	5.84
"Buried Memory" (US 1.9) The body of a teenager is found close to a gold mine, six years after his disappearance. The mine owner, his father, is now in jail for killing his wife, but has no memory of the event. Cast: Niels Arestrup as Hervé Gerfaut, Florence Thomassin as Mathilde Liorade, Sara Martins as Irène Ruff, Daniel Hanssens as Max Boilon, Pascal Elso as Scientific Technician
10	3	"Sang & Lumière"	Josée Dayan	Marc Eisenchteter, John McNulty & Elsa Marpeau	17 April 2018	7.23
""Blood and Light" (US 1.10) A retired Scotland Yard detective helps Marleau investigate in a town filled with English expats. Cast: David Suchet as Herbert White, Laura Smet as Lucie Verterac, Jérôme Kircher as Thomas Chapuizet
11	4	"Le Jeune Homme et la Mort"	Josée Dayan	Alexandra Clert, Thomas Luntz & Sonia Moyersoen	24 April 2018	6.54
"The Young Man and Death" (US 1.11) Is Garin protecting someone? Captain Marleau - like a sniffer dog - will at the end find her innocent prey. Cast: Jean-Hugues Anglade as Alexandre Eckert, Évelyne Bouix as Joyce Kramer, Marianne Denicourt as Sabrina Eckert, Florence Darel as Blanche Allard, Stanislas Merhar as Philippe Venturi
12	5	"Double Jeu"	Josée Dayan	Elsa Marpeau	23 October 2018	6.61
"Double Dealing" (US 1.12) A body is found, and the victim bears a remarkable resemblance to Captain Marleau. Cast: Pierre-François Martin-Laval as Paul Dalvet, Grégoire Leprince-Ringuet as Gabriel Dalvet, Christopher Thompson as Charles Castillon, Pierre Perret as Monsieur Pellisson, Jackie Berroyer as Doctor Aboumehri, Jean-Claude Drouot as Léopold Salaun, Dominique Besnehard as The detective
13	6	"Les Roseaux noirs"	Josée Dayan	Marc-Antoine Laurent, Jean-Marc Taba & Elsa Marpeau	30 October 2018	6.41
"The Black Reeds" (US 2.1) Called in to solve the murder of a former racing driver, Marleau quickly realizes that the killer has the wrong target. Embedded in a family affair, the captain will do everything to discover the truth. Cast: Nicole Garcia as Irene Denan, Hippolyte Girardot as Pierre Claudel, Raphaëlle Agogué as Lella Borg, Élodie Frenck as Christine Delfino
14	7	"Les Ne plus mourir, jamais"	Josee Dayan	Marc Eisenchteter, Christian Francois	2 April 2019	N/A
"Never to Die Again" (US 2.2) Emerging from a 15-year coma, a woman sets out to recoup her losses. Cast: Cécile Knibiehly-Porterfield, Sarah Pasquier, Raph, Jeff Bigot, Quentin Dolmaire, Lily Taïeb, Franck Beckmann, Clara Pirali, Yannick Renier, Corinne Masiero, Didier Flamand, Isabelle Adjani, Christine Murillo, Guillaume Verdier, Thibault de Montalembert, Pierre Renverseau

=== Season 3 (2019—2020) ===
No. overall	No. in season	Title	Directed by	Written by	Original release date	Viewers (millions)
15	1	"Une voix dans la nuit"	Josee Dayan	Pierre Delorme, Robin Barataud	9 April 2019	
"A Voice in the Night" (US 2.3) (produced in 2019) Eva Detrais, hosts a radio show "Broken Hearts". A caller, Chloé, confides live on the air when a shot rings out, and she is found dead. Captain Marleau begins her investigation and quickly understands that Eva knows a lot more about the tragedy than she wants to admit. Cast: Marie Polet, Justin Blanckaert, Emmanuelle Michelet, Micha Lescot, Guy Carlier, Eddy Mbajum, Corinne Masiero, Benjamin Biolay, Stéphane Debac, Jean-Maximilien Sobocinski, Jeanne Balibar, Victor Belmondo, Sarah Feder, Pauline Discry, Judith Parsis, Nicolas Grard, Martine Boutang, Adeline Fleur Baude, Sebastien Colaert, Armel Cazedepats, Camille Garcia, Claudia Fortunato, Camille, Julien Emirian, Grégory Allaeys, Jack Claudany
16	2	"Grand Huit"	Josee Dayan	Corinne Masiero, Alexis Miansarow, Marc Eisenchteter, Robin Barataud	18 August 2020	
"Roller Coaster" (US 2.4) (produced in 2019) An amusement park worker was murdered. The victim was the father of a young man, who could be taken in by Antoine and Lucie, the owners of the park, as the suspect. During her investigations, Marleau discovers that this is not the first time that a tragedy has occurred on the park. Did Antoine and Lucie conceal information from the police? Cast: Bernard Verley, Xavier Robic, Tom Villa, JoeyStarr, Corinne Masiero, Marina Hands, Bernard Alane, Serge Hazanavicius, Myriam Boyer, Sophie Verbeeck
17	3	"Quelques maux d'amour"	Josee Dayan	Corinne Masiero, Alexis Miansarow, Marc Eisenchteter, Robin Barataud	25 August 2020	
"Lover Gone Bad" (US 2.5) (produced in 2019) Frédéric, who is going to marry off his daughter, is impatiently awaiting this great event. Unfortunately, he hardly has time to take advantage of this announced happiness: he is assassinated the very day of the festivities. Marleau inherits the investigation. She inquires about the guests and notes with surprise that the singer Daniel Rivière, the idol of her 20 years, was among the guests. He was a friend of the victim. Cast: Stéphane Boucher, Jérôme Le Banner, André Manoukian, Sandy Lobry, Corinne Masiero, Nathalie Boutefeu, Ymanol Perset, Jean-Luc Mimault, Alain Verderosa, Charlie Poggio, India Hair, Cédric Milard, Jérôme Legrand, Johan Ledoux, Guillaume Ledoux, Quentin Ballif, Yamée Couture, Roman Kané, Ilian Bergala, Kad Merad
18	4	"Pace e salute, Marleau!"	Josee Dayan	Corinne Masiero, Jean-Marc Taba, Marc-Antoine Laurent, Marc Eisenchteter	1 September 2020	
"Peace and Health" (us 2.6) (produced in 2019) In the heart of a Corsican village, the lifeless body of a former general practitioner is discovered alongside his unconscious wife. Marleau suspects their daughter, Lézia, a surgeon who has returned from Paris to take over from her father, of hiding something. She understands that her return has created enmity, including that of her former fiancé who should have taken over the deceased's practice. When she comes out of a coma, the victim's wife claims that her husband committed suicide. However, Marleau persists in believing that it is indeed a murder. Despite the omerta, she tries to unlock the secrets of a family that is more tormented than it seems. Cast: Catherine Rouvel, Brigitte Sy, Guy Cimino, Corinne Masiero, Didier Landucci, Philippe Duquesne, Mélanie Doutey, Jean-Pierre Bouvier, Jean-Marc Michelangeli, Laurent Capelluto, Thomas Bronzini de Caraffa, Daniel Martin, Massimo Riggi, Iris Bry, Cédric Appietto, Maria Ducceschi, Michel Ferracci, Jean-Pierre Giudicelli
19	5	"Veuves mais pas trop"	Josee Dayan	Sylvain Saada	8 September 2020	
"The Merry Widow" (us 2.7) (produced in 2019) Alerted by a mysterious crow, Marleau lands in a small town: a dead man has disappeared from the funeral directors in charge of his embalming. No body, no evidence, no evidence, no crime! But it takes a little more to discourage Captain Marleau, who smells suspicious in the undertaker and embalmer, adorable father, and charmer in the service of some rather cheerful widows. It is not their late husbands who will contradict them, disappeared one after the other. Cast: Edouard Baer, Valentine Cadic, Noémie Lenoir, Wilfred Benaïche, Corinne Masiero, Nicolas Robin, Olivier Broche, Sophie Guillemin, Bruno Lochet, Jean-Claude Drouot, Anne Brochet, Isabelle Candelier, Maïra Schmitt
20	6	"L'Arbre aux Esclaves"	Josee Dayan	Viviane Zingg, Marc Eisenchteter, Stephan Guérin-Tillié, Elsa Marpeau	6 October 2020	
"The Slave Tree" (US 2.8) (produced in 2020) Marleau takes a well-deserved vacation in Guadeloupe, where she finds one of her friends, Loïc. She hopes to enjoy the sun and the beach, but changes her mind when she learns that a musician has been murdered in a club. To assist the gendarmes, Marleau does not hesitate to review his schedule. She is interested in the last people who saw the victim. They are Anne Duplessis, a sailing champion who does not let herself be told, and her daughter, Océane. For now, nothing else connects them to the crime. Cast: Jean-Pierre Lorit, Maxence Vandevelde, Paul Kircher, Léa Lopez, Marco Prince, Bryan Trésor, Ralph Amoussou, Corinne Masiero, Jean-Louis Loca, Florence Darel, Virginie Ledoyen, Nicolas de Vipart, Jacques Spiesser
21	7	"La Reine des Glaces"	Josee Dayan	Corinne Masiero, Emmanuelle Michelet, Marc Eisenchteter, Maïa Muller	13 October 2020	
"The Ice Queen" (US 3.1) (produced in 2019) Captain Marleau investigates the murder of a figure skater. The victim, Lucie Engelberg, is said to have died as a result of violent beatings. However, a few hours earlier the young woman was still training alongside another ice show star, Salomé Revel. The latter, who is now among the suspects, seemed to fear the end of her career with anguish and was injured during rehearsal. Even if the skater seems like an ideal suspect, Marleau discovers that this case turns out to be much more complex. Indeed, behind the professional rivalries would in fact hide family secrets. Cast: Sylvie Testud, Louis Seillé, Jade Pedri, Bastien Pujol, Nathalie Roche, Yann Babilée Keogh, Stéphane Grossi, Sébastien Harquet, Emeline Faure, Côme Levin, Bertrand Degrémont, Christophe Lambert, Steevy Boulay, Nino Kirtadze, Corinne Masiero
22	8	"Au Nom du Fils"	Josee Dayan	Christian Francois, Marc Eisenchteter	5 December 2020	
"In The Image of the Son" (US 3.2) (produced in 2020) The driver of a tourist train is found dead. The man's name is Robert Lanski and he was already responsible for a train accident that claimed the life of a teenager five years earlier. Investigators are trying to find out if it was revenge. Captain Marleau suspects the priest Damien, who would have good reason to be angry with Lanski. The man seems to know more than he pretends and knows all the secrets of the region. Cast: Olivier Gourmet, Naël Malassagne, Agathe Natanson, Corinne Masiero, Arthur Mazet, François Loriquet, Eriq Ebouaney, Jeanne Cherhal, Fatou N'Diaye, Grégoire Colin, Anouk Grinberg, Christian Balthauss

=== Season 4 (2021) ===
No. overall	No. in season	Title	Directed by	Written by	Original release date	Viewers (millions)
23	1	"La cité des âmes en peine"	Josee Dayan	Marc-Antoine Laurent, Jean-Marc Taba, Marc Eisenchteter	5 March 2021	N/A
"The City Of Souls" (US 3.3) (produced in 2021) In Royan, an old acquaintance of Marleau is accused of murder. The victim is the boss of a fishery. The captain must deal with Alex Weller, a renowned policeman whom the prosecutor co-seized, and who seems to be investigating for the prosecution. Between cigarette trafficking, precariousness and social revenge, mobiles flourish around the inhabitants of a neighborhood threatened with destruction. But Marleau's suspicions soon fall on Weller. Indeed, why did the latter insist on being in charge of the investigation? Could there be a link with his daughter, once found dead while on vacation in the region? Cast: Béatrice Dalle, Riwan Belkacemi, Sophie Mourousi, Adrien Dantou, Guillaume Duhesme, Victoria Eber, Mathieu Madénian, Arnaud Ducret, Astrid Bergès-Frisbey, Corinne Masiero, François Hadji-Lazaro, Caroline Proust
24	2	"Deux vies"	Josee Dayan	Marc Eisenchteter, Robin Barataud, Pierre Delorme, Elsa Marpeau	10 March 2021	N/A
"Two Lives" (US 3.4) (produced in 2021) Laetitia, a woman in her forties, is found strangled in the heart of a forest, with no witnesses or apparent motive. Marleau discovers that Laetitia is actually called Pauline and that her husband and daughter thought she had been dead for ten years. A man seems to hold the keys to the mystery surrounding the life of Pauline, alias Laetitia. Christophe, a farmer by trade, had a relationship with the deceased. Marleau's investigation will establish that, under his calm appearance, he had more than one reason for killing her...Cast: Pascal Légitimus, Hélène Zidi, Maeva Gonzalez, Théo Trifard, Gustave de Kerven, Jérôme Huguet, Corinne Masiero, Riton Liebman, Albert Delpy, Marina Golovine, Mylène Demongeot, Nicolas Vaude, Frédéric Bourgade, Frédérique Bel
25	3	"Claire obscure"	Josee Dayan	Marc Eisenchteter, John McNulty	8 April 2021	N/A
"Clair's Dark Side" (US 3.5) (produced in 2021) 17 year old Claire was she skipping the lessons of Yannick Séguin, one of her teachers at the agricultural college, and now she is dead. The principal, who is also Claire's mother-in-law, is upset: she should never have hired this charismatic teacher who apparently had ambiguous relations with his students. Cast: Pascale Arbillot, Nino Gamet, Ayumi Roux, Liah O'Prey, CharlElie Couture, Corinne Masiero, Bénabar, Alexis Desseaux, Thierry Hancisse, Marius Colucci, Nolwenn Leroy, Anna Eisenchteter
26	4	"L'Homme qui brûle"	Josee Dayan	Corinne Masiero, Christian François, Claude Luxel, Alexandra Clert, Jean-Marc Taba, Sonia Moyersoen, John McNulty, Marc-Antoine Laurent, Marc Eisenchteter, Maïa Muller, Thomas Luntz, Emmanuelle Michelet, Stéphan Guérin-Tillié, Sylvie Granotier, Lucien Riffard	15 April 2021	N/A
A young woman, Lily Terrier, is found poisoned with cyanide in the hair salon where she works. Marleau discovers love letters that Frédéric Lefranc, actor and director at the municipal theatre, had addressed to the victim. And as he is about to give Othello, the drama of jealousy is probably not far away. However, the investigation brings to light Lily's shadowy past. What if Frédéric Lefranc, his wife and their three daughters knew a lot more than they care to admit? From the theater scene to the crime scene, Marleau unearths everyone's secrets. Cast: Stéphane Rideau, Adam Celik, Sélène Assaf, Elie Semoun, Marie Dompnier, Yara Pilartz, Jean-Claude Bolle-Reddat, Agathe Natanson, Corinne Masiero, Claire Nebout, Marius Colucci, Anne Alvaro, Gérard Darmon

== See also ==
- List of French television series
