= Tim Kircher =

German footballer

Personal information
- Date of birth: 10 March 1999 (age 27)
- Place of birth: Rastatt, Germany
- Height: 1.80 m (5 ft 11 in)
- Position: Right-back

Team information
- Current team: TSV Steinbach
- Number: 19

Youth career
- –2008: SV Au am Rhein
- 2008–2018: Karlsruher SC

Senior career*
Years	Team	Apps	(Gls)
2017–2018	Karlsruher SC II	2	(0)
2018–2020	Karlsruher SC	3	(0)
2019–2020	→ Carl Zeiss Jena (loan)	26	(0)
2020–2021	VfB Lübeck	6	(0)
2021–	TSV Steinbach	46	(4)
- * Club domestic league appearances and goals as of 20:16, 21 May 2023 (UTC)

Tim Kircher (born 10 March 1999) is a German professional footballer who plays as a right-back for TSV Steinbach.

== Career ==
On 10 June 2019, Kircher joined FC Carl Zeiss Jena on loan from Karlsruher SC for the 2019–20 season.
