= Irène Jacob =

French-Swiss actress

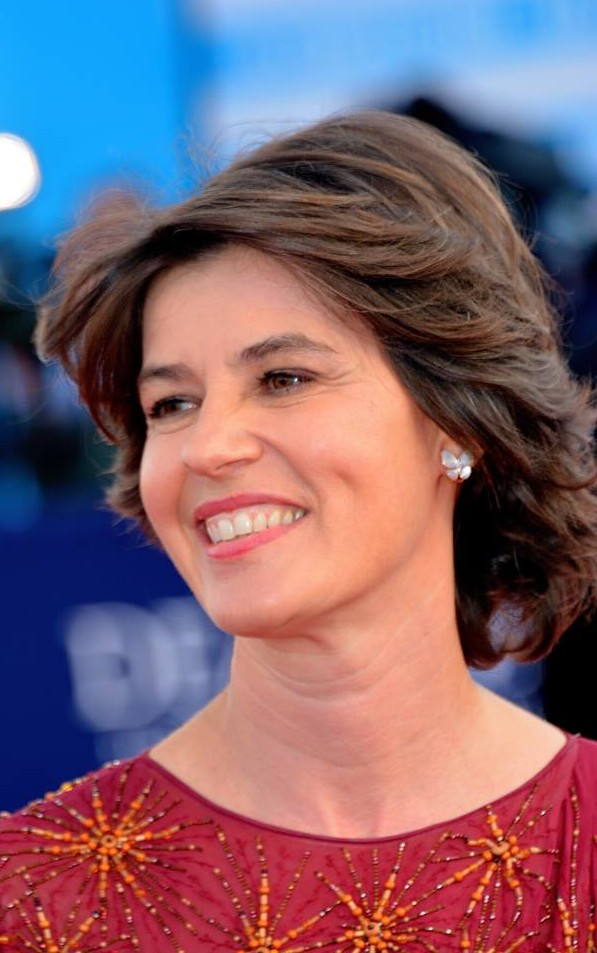
- Irène Jacob in 2017
- Born: Irène Marie Jacob; 15 July 1966 (age 60); Suresnes, France
- Occupation: Actress
- Years active: 1987–present
- Agent: Christopher Robba
- Spouse: Jérôme Kircher (m. 2000)
- Children: Paul Kircher; Samuel Kircher
- Parent: Maurice Jacob (father)

Irène Marie Jacob (born 15 July 1966) is a French-Swiss actress known for her work with Polish film director Krzysztof Kieślowski. She won the 1991 Cannes Film Festival Award for Best Actress for the Kieślowski film The Double Life of Veronique, and was nominated for the BAFTA Award for Best Actress in a Leading Role for her 1994 film Three Colours: Red. Her other film appearances include The Secret Garden (1993), Beyond the Clouds (1995), U.S. Marshals (1998), and Eternity (2016).

== Early life ==
Irène Jacob was born in Suresnes, Hauts-de-Seine, a western suburb of Paris. The youngest child with three older brothers, she was raised in a highly educated and intellectual family and environment: her father, Maurice Jacob, was a physicist; her mother, a psychologist; one brother, Francis Jacob, a musician; and her other two brothers, scientists. In 1969, at the age of three, Irène moved with her family to Geneva, Switzerland, where she became interested in the arts.

My family was very shy with feelings and never spoke about them, but we evolved a little bit. I think part of the reason I was attracted to theater was because I wanted to be close to stories because they could help me relate to my family.

Jacob developed an interest in performing after seeing the films of Charlie Chaplin. "They took my heart", she has recalled. "They made me laugh and cry, and that was exactly what I was waiting for in a film: to awaken me to my feelings."

She made her stage debut in 1977 at the age of 11. She attended the Geneva Conservatory of Music and earned a degree in languages (she speaks fluent French, English, German, and Italian). She also studied at the Drama Studio in London, England. In 1984, she moved to Paris, where she studied acting at the prestigious Rue Blanche École nationale supérieure des arts et techniques du théâtre (a French national drama academy).

== Career ==
In Paris, while a 21-year-old drama student, she obtained her first film role in the Louis Malle film Au revoir les enfants (1987), playing the part of a piano teacher. She followed her film debut with several French movies—mostly minor roles—over the next four years.

Polish film director Krzysztof Kieślowski cast her in the lead role of his film The Double Life of Veronique (1991), the allegorical story of two young women, one in Poland and the other in France, both of whom are played by Jacob. For her performance, Jacob won the Best Actress award at the Cannes Film Festival.

From 1992 to 1993, despite numerous offers from Hollywood that came in the wake of her success, including the lead role in Indecent Proposal, Jacob focused on smaller French films.

Jacob gained international acclaim as the protagonist in Kieślowski's Three Colours: Red (1994), which received three Academy Award nominations for Best Director, Best Cinematography, and Best Original Screenplay. The film was also named Best Film or Best Foreign Film by the National Board of Review, New York Film Critics Circle Awards, National Society of Film Critics Awards, and Los Angeles Film Critics Association Awards. It received César Award nominations for Best Film, Best Actor (Jean-Louis Trintignant), Best Actress (Irène Jacob), Best Director (Krzysztof Kieślowski), Best Original Screenplay or Adaptation (Krzysztof Kieślowski and Krzysztof Piesiewicz). The New York Times included the film in its list of "The Best 1000 Movies Ever Made."

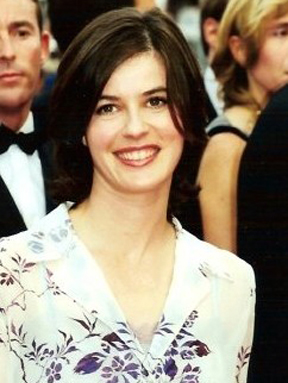
Irène Jacob at the 1991 Cannes Film Festival.

Naturally an introvert, Jacob has the ability to express the emotional turmoil of her characters with very few words. This was very evident in her performance in Three Colours: Red, the third part of Kieślowski's trilogy. Jacob described her unique experience working with the Polish film director:

The camera was really like a microscope. Krzysztof was always very close and very precise in his directions. It was not something he talked about beforehand; he would only work on the set. He liked to rehearse just before a take, if at all.

— Irène Jacob, The Guardian

Following the release of Three Colours: Red, Jacob retreated from public attention and took nine months off, spending most of her time reading Tolstoy, Balzac, Singer, and several autobiographies.

From 1995 to 1999, Jacob made a series of American and European films that met with varying degrees of commercial and critical success. In 1995, she appeared in six films, including Victory, with Willem Dafoe and Sam Neill; Michelangelo Antonioni's Beyond the Clouds; and Oliver Parker's adaptation of William Shakespeare's Othello, in which Jacob spoke all of her lines in English for the first time on film. In the following years, she made several moderately successful American films, including Incognito (1997); U.S. Marshals (1998), starring opposite Wesley Snipes and Tommy Lee Jones; The Big Brass Ring (1999), with William Hurt; and Spy Games (1999), with Bill Pullman and Bruno Kirby.

Beginning in 2000, Jacob's film career slowed down, and after a series of independent, mostly European films, she revived her theatre career. In 2000, she played the title character in Madame Melville opposite Macaulay Culkin in London's West End. In 2014, she played the mother of an android in The Metamorphosis, Android Version by Japanese director Oriza Hirata and roboticist Hiroshi Ishiguro at the Autumn Festival Normandy.

In 2016, she began appearing as a featured character in Season 3 of the Showtime series The Affair.

In August 2018, Jacob appeared at the Edinburgh Festival in a one-hour dramatization of the novella La Maladie de la mort (The Malady of Death) by Marguerite Duras. Jacob played the role of the unseen narrator.

Jacob is author of the book Big Bang published in 2019.

== Filmography ==
Year	Title	Role	Notes
1987	Au revoir les enfants	Mlle Davenne	English: Goodbye, Children
1988	La bande des quatre	Marine	English: The Gang of Four
1989	Erreur de jeunesse	Anne	
1989	Les mannequins d'osier	Marie	
1989	Nick chasseur de têtes		Television program
1990	La Veillée	Johanna	English: The Van Gogh Wake
1991	The Secret of Sarah Tombelaine	Sarah	French: Le secret de Sarah Tombelaine
1991	The Double Life of Veronique	Weronika/Véronique	French: La Double vie de Véronique; Cannes Film Festival Award for Best Actress; César Award for Best Actress nomination Sant Jordi Award for Best Foreign Actress
1992	Le moulin de Daudet	Mme Daudet	English: Daudet's Windmill
1992	Enak	Lucille Spaakv	
1993	Claude	Beatrice	English: Trusting Beatrice
1993	The Secret Garden	Mrs. Lennox/Lilias Craven	
1993	Predskazaniye	Lyuda	English: The Prediction; Nika Award Best Actress nomination
1994	Three Colours: Red	Valentine Dussaut	French: Trois couleurs: Rouge; César Award for Best Actress nomination BAFTA Award for Best Actress nomination
1995	Victory	Alma	
1995	Fugueuses	Prune	English: Runaways
1995	Beyond the Clouds	The girl	French: Par-delà les nuages
1995	All Men Are Mortal	Regina	
1995	Faire un film pour moi c'est vivre		
1995	Othello	Desdemona	
1997	Incognito	Prof. Marieke van den Broeck	
1998	Jack's potes		
1998	U.S. Marshals	Marie Bineaux	
1998	American Cuisine	Gabrielle Boyer	French: Cuisine américaine
1999	Cuisine chinoise	Patricia	
1999	The Big Brass Ring	Cela Brandini	
1999	My Life So Far	Aunt Heloise	
1999	Spy Games	Natasha Scriabina/Anna Belinka	
2000	L'Affaire Marcorelle	Agneska	English: The Marcorelle Affair
2001	Letter from an Unknown Woman	Rose	French: Lettre d'une inconnue Television film
2001	Fourplay	Fiona Delgrazia	
2002	Mille millièmes	Julie	The Landlords
2003	La Légende de Parva	Voice of La mère de Parva	
2003	Nés de la mère du monde	Clara Sidowski	Television film
2004	The Pornographer: A Love Story		
2004	Automne	Michelle	English: Autumn
2004	Battle of the Brave (Nouvelle-France)	Angélique de Roquebrune	
2006	The Education of Fairies	Ingrid	
2007	The Inner Life of Martin Frost	Claire Martin	
2007	Fallen Heroes	Anne	
2008	The Dust of Time	Eleni	Directed by Theo Angelopoulos
2009	The French Kissers	Aurore's mother	French: La mère d'Aurore
2010	Rio Sex Comedy	Irène	
2014	L'Art de la fugue	Mathilde	
2014	Dying of the Light	Michelle Zuberain	
2014	Salaud, on t'aime	Printemps Kaminsky	
2015	Ella Maillart - Double Journey	Ella Maillart	voice over
2015	Sayonara		
2016	The Collection	Marianne	
2016	Eternity	Gabrielle's mother	
2016	The Affair	Juliette Le Gall	TV series (10 episodes)
2016	Capitaine Marleau	Sister Maryse	TV series (1 episode)
2019	The OA	Elodie	TV series (3 episodes)
2020	Villa Caprice	Nancy Fontaine	
2020	Romantic Guide to Lost Places	Brigitte	
2024	Who by Fire (Comme le feu)		
2024	Hotel Silence (Hôtel Silence)	Kristina	
2024	Meeting with Pol Pot (Rendez-vous avec Pol Pot)	Lise Delbo	Directed by Rithy Panh
2025	Golem in Pompei		Directed by Amos Gitai
2026	Maigret and the Dead Lover	Madame Maigret	Directed by Pascal Bonitzer
TBA	The Custom of the Country †		Filming

== Awards ==
Year	Award	Category	Nominated work	Result	Ref.
1991	Cannes Film Festival	Best Actress	The Double Life of Veronique	Won	
1992	César Awards	Best Actress	The Double Life of Veronique	Nominated	
1993	Sant Jordi Awards	Best Foreign Actress Award	The Double Life of Veronique	Won	
1994	Nika Award	Best Actress	Predskazaniye	Nominated	
1995	César Awards	Best Actress	Three Colours: Red	Nominated	
1995	British Academy of Film and Television Arts	Best Actress in a Leading Role	Three Colours: Red	Nominated	
2002	Camerimage	Krzysztof Kieślowski Special Award	—N/a	Won	
2024	Locarno Film Festival	Leopard Club Award	—N/a	Won	
