= Maurice Jacob =

French theoretical particle physicist

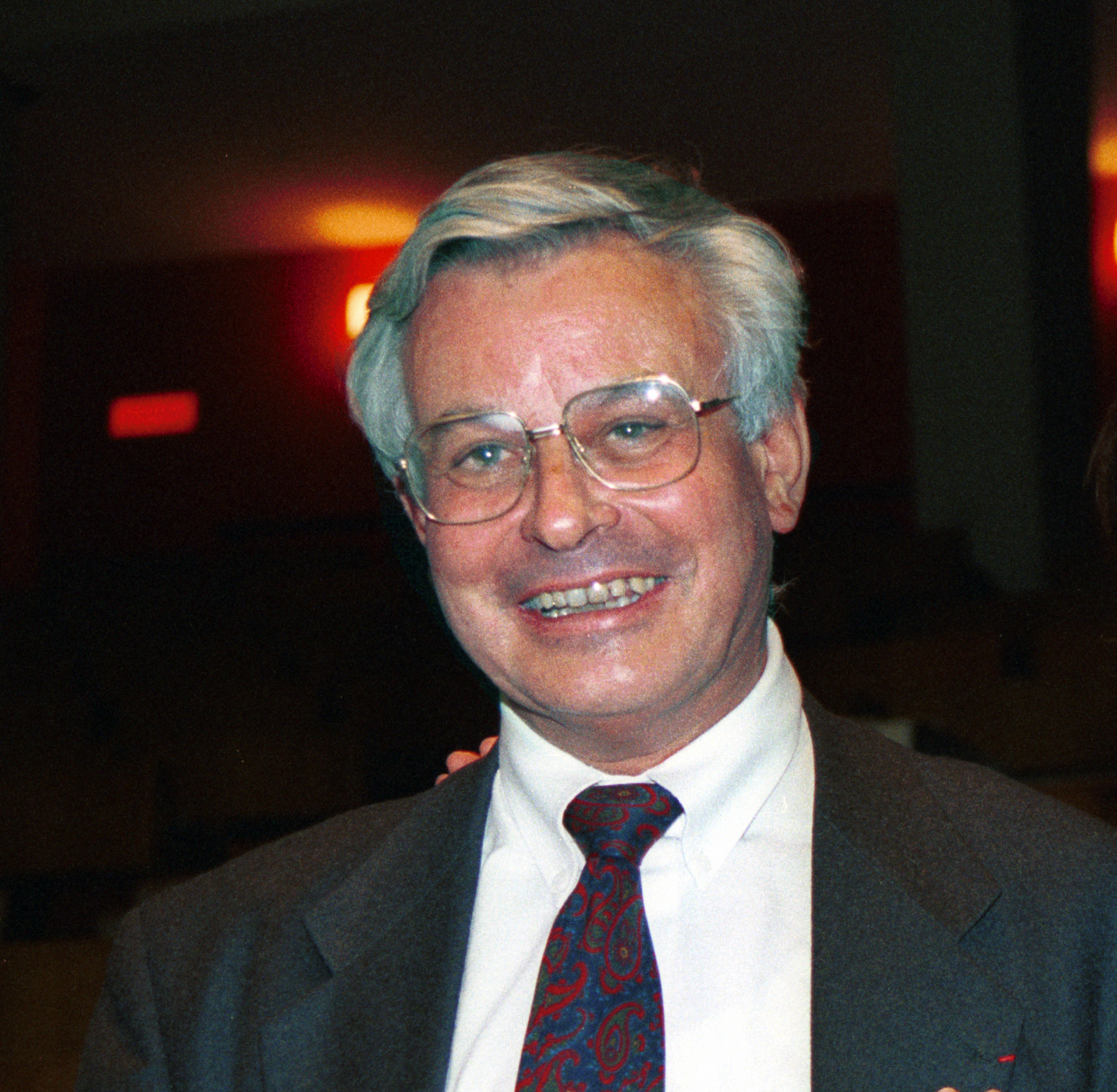
- Born: 28 March 1933; 4th arrondissement of Lyon
- Died: 2 May 2007 (aged 74); Geneva
- Education: École normale supérieure University of Paris (PhD)
- Occupation: Physicist
- Children: Irène Jacob
- Father: Maurice Jacob
- Awards: CNRS Silver Medal; Legion of Honour
- Scientific career
- Workplaces: Brookhaven National Laboratory; Caltech; Saclay; CERN

Maurice René Michel Jacob (28 March 1933 – 2 May 2007) was a French theoretical particle physicist.

== Biography ==
Maurice Jacob studied physics at École normale supérieure from 1953 to 1957. During a visit to the Brookhaven National Laboratory in 1959, he developed with Gian-Carlo Wick the helicity formalism for relativistic description of scattering of particles with spin and the decay of particles and resonant states. In 1961, he obtained a doctorate on this subject at the University of Paris. His thesis advisors were professors Francis Perrin and Gian-Carlo Wick. Jacob then moved, as a post-doctoral fellow, to Caltech. He worked in Saclay from 1961 to 1967. From 1967 he worked at CERN until his retirement in 1998. From 1982 to 1988, he headed the theoretical physics division of CERN and in the 1990s, he was responsible for CERN's relations with its Member States.

Maurice Jacob's research focuses on the phenomenology of strong interactions, including diffraction, scaling, high-transverse-momentum processes and the formation of quark–gluon plasma. In particular, he pioneered the studies of inclusive hadron-production processes, including scaling and its violations. He contributed also to the field of accelerator physics together with Tai Tsun Wu.

He supported Carlo Rubbia during the construction of the Super Proton Synchrotron (SPS) in the 1980s.

Maurice Jacob played a key role in bringing together different groups from the experimental and theoretical nuclear and particle physics communities to initiate an ultrarelativistic heavy-ion collision program at the CERN SPS, in order to search for the quark-gluon plasma.

Jacob chaired the French Physical Society from 1985 to 2002 and from 1991 to 1993 he was president of the European Physical Society. In 1993, he became a member of the American Physical Society. He was co-editor of Physics Letters B and Physics Reports.

He was appointed member of the CNRS scientific council in 1988.

He was a corresponding member of the Academy of Sciences from 1977, member of the Swedish Royal Academies and also scientific advisor to the European Space Agency.

== Awards and honors ==
- CNRS Silver Medal (1967)
- Legion of Honour (1994)

== Marriage and children ==
Maurice Jacob was married to Lise Jacob. Together they have 4 children Jimmy, Thierry, Francis, and Irène.
