= Jérôme Kircher =

French actor (born 1964)

- Born: 21 November 1964 (age 61); Paris, France
- Occupation: Actor
- Spouse: Irène Jacob (m. 2000)
- Children: Paul Kircher; Samuel Kircher

Jérôme Kircher (French: [ʒeʁom kiʁʃɛʁ]; born 21 November 1964) is a French actor known for A Very Long Engagement (2004), Louise Wimmer (2011) and Café de Flore (2011).

== Biography ==
Born in Paris, Kircher is a stage actor and was a student of the Conservatoire national supérieur d'art dramatique from 1985 to 1988; he was a student of Michel Bouquet and Gerard Desarthe Bernard Dort. He began his career in 1986 in the short film The Train of dawn Laurent Jaoui. Since then he has starred in several series, like Clara Sheller, Jacques where he played, and played the greatest texts, directed by Patrice Chéreau, Jean-Pierre Vincent, André Engel, Denis Podalydès, among others, and was nominated for three Molière Awards. He appeared in the short film by Éric Laporte in 1995 False Start, staged Berthe Trepat, gold medal in 2001 and I know that there are also reciprocal love (but I do not pretend to luxury) in 2005. The same year, he reappears in a short film, The Book of Belleville dead Jean-Jacques Joudiau.

He is married to fellow actor Irène Jacob. Their sons, Paul and Samuel, are also actors.

== Filmography ==
- A Very Long Engagement (2004)
- Louise Wimmer (2011)
- Café de Flore (2011)
- Sayonara (2015)
- Capitaine Marleau (2015) - 1 Episode
